= Politics of Liechtenstein =

Liechtenstein is a principality governed under a semi-constitutional monarchy. It has a form of mixed constitution in which political power is shared by the monarch and a democratically elected parliament. It is a representative democracy in which the prime minister and government is responsible to parliament. However, the Prince of Liechtenstein is head of state and exercises considerable political powers.

The executive power is exercised by the Cabinet of Liechtenstein (government), headed by the Prime Minister. Legislative power is vested in both the government and the Landtag (Parliament). The party system is dominated by the conservative Progressive Citizens' Party (FBP) and the liberal-conservative Patriotic Union (VU). The judiciary is independent of the executive and the legislature.

The country replaced universal male suffrage with universal suffrage in 1984, following a national referendum.

== Constitution ==
The current iteration of the Constitution of Liechtenstein was adopted in March 2003, amending the 1921 constitution. The 1921 constitution had established Liechtenstein as a constitutional monarchy headed by the reigning prince of the Princely House of Liechtenstein; a parliamentary system had been established, although the reigning Prince retained substantial political authority.

In a national referendum in March 2003, nearly two-thirds of the electorate voted in support of Hans-Adam II's proposed constitutional reform. The proposals were criticised by many, including the Council of Europe, as it expanded the powers of the monarchy (extending monarch's power of veto law, increasing his executive authority, and allowing him to dismiss the government, or any minister, at will). The Prince threatened that if the constitution failed, he would, among other things, convert some princely property for commercial use and move to Austria. The princely family and the Prince enjoy tremendous public support inside the nation, and the resolution passed with about 64% in favour. A proposal to revoke the Prince's veto powers was rejected by 76% of voters in a 2012 referendum.

== Executive branch ==
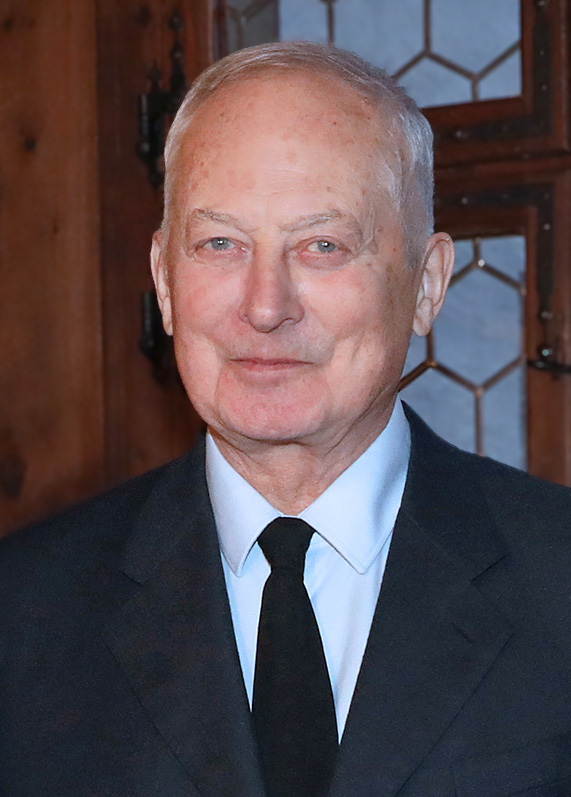
Hans-Adam II, Prince of Liechtenstein

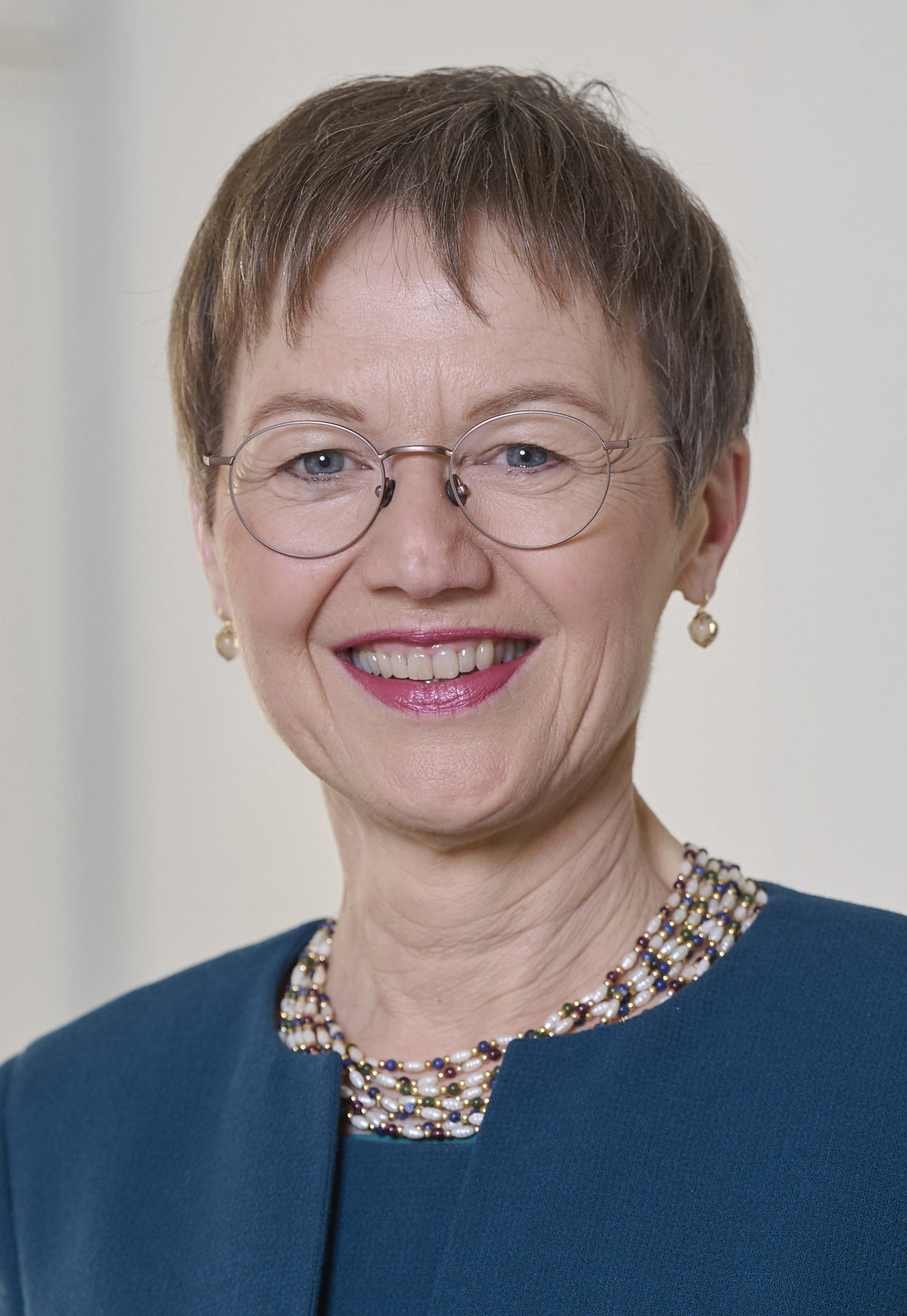
Brigitte Haas, the incumbent prime minister

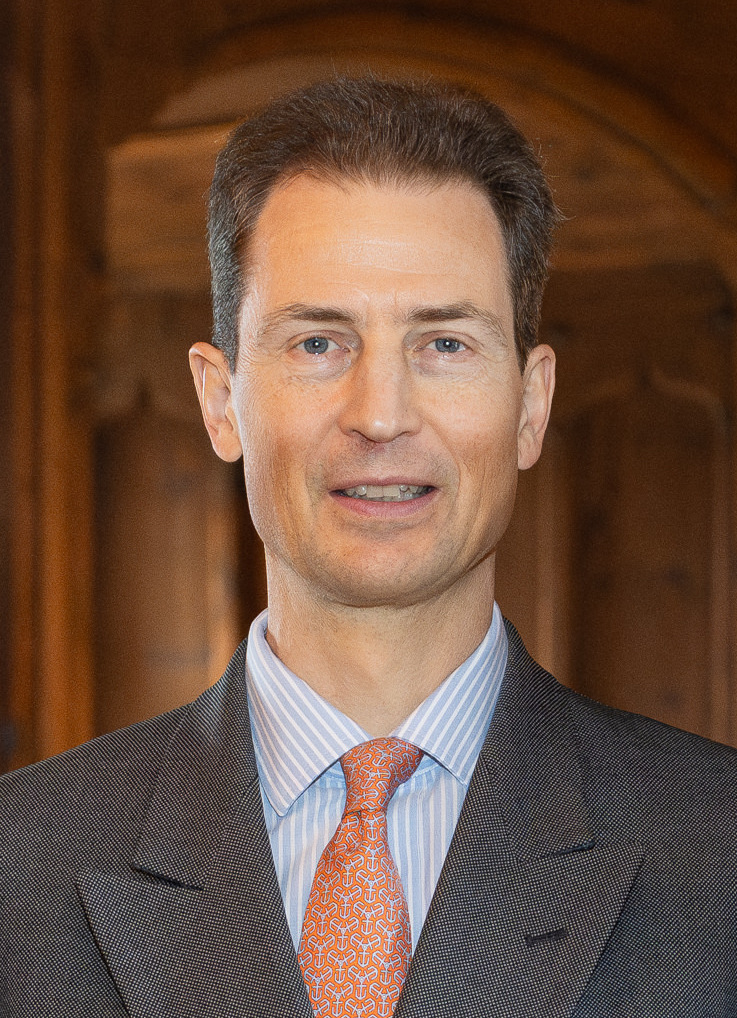
Prince Alois, the Prince Regent

Main office-holders
Office	Name	Party	Since
Prince	Hans-Adam II		13 November 1989
Prince-regent	Alois		15 August 2004
Prime Minister	Brigitte Haas	Patriotic Union	10 April 2025

The monarch of Liechtenstein is hereditary. Following legislative elections, the head of government (German: Regierungschef), or prime minister, are appointed by the sovereign prince of Liechtenstein with the consent of the Landtag and are expected to command the confidence of both the prince and the Landtag. The appointed head of government is typically the leader of the political party with the most seats in the Landtag or a coalition of parties. Amendments to the constitution or new laws have to be adopted by the Landtag, signed by both the prince and the prime minister, and published in the Principality's Law Gazette.

Hans-Adam II, Prince of Liechtenstein has been the head of state since 1989. His constitutional powers include the power to veto any legislation, to be used at his discretion, as well as the dissolution of the Landtag, which may become subject to referendum if challenged. He represents the state vis-à-vis foreign states. He signs international treaties either in person or delegates this function to a plenipotentiary. Some treaties under international law become valid only when they have been ratified by the Landtag. On the basis of the names put forward by the Landtag, the Prince nominates the government, district and high court judges, the judges of the Supreme Court, and the presidents and their deputies of the Constitutional Court and of the Administrative Court of Appeal. The Prince's other authorities include exercising the right to mitigate and commute punishments that have been imposed with legal force and the abolition — i.e., the dismissal — of investigations that have been initiated. All judgments are issued in the name of the Prince.

In August 2004, Prince Hans-Adam handed over the day-to-day running of the country to his son, Prince Alois, while still remaining the official head of state. Since April 2025, the incumbent prime minister has been Brigitte Haas of the VU.

=== Government ===
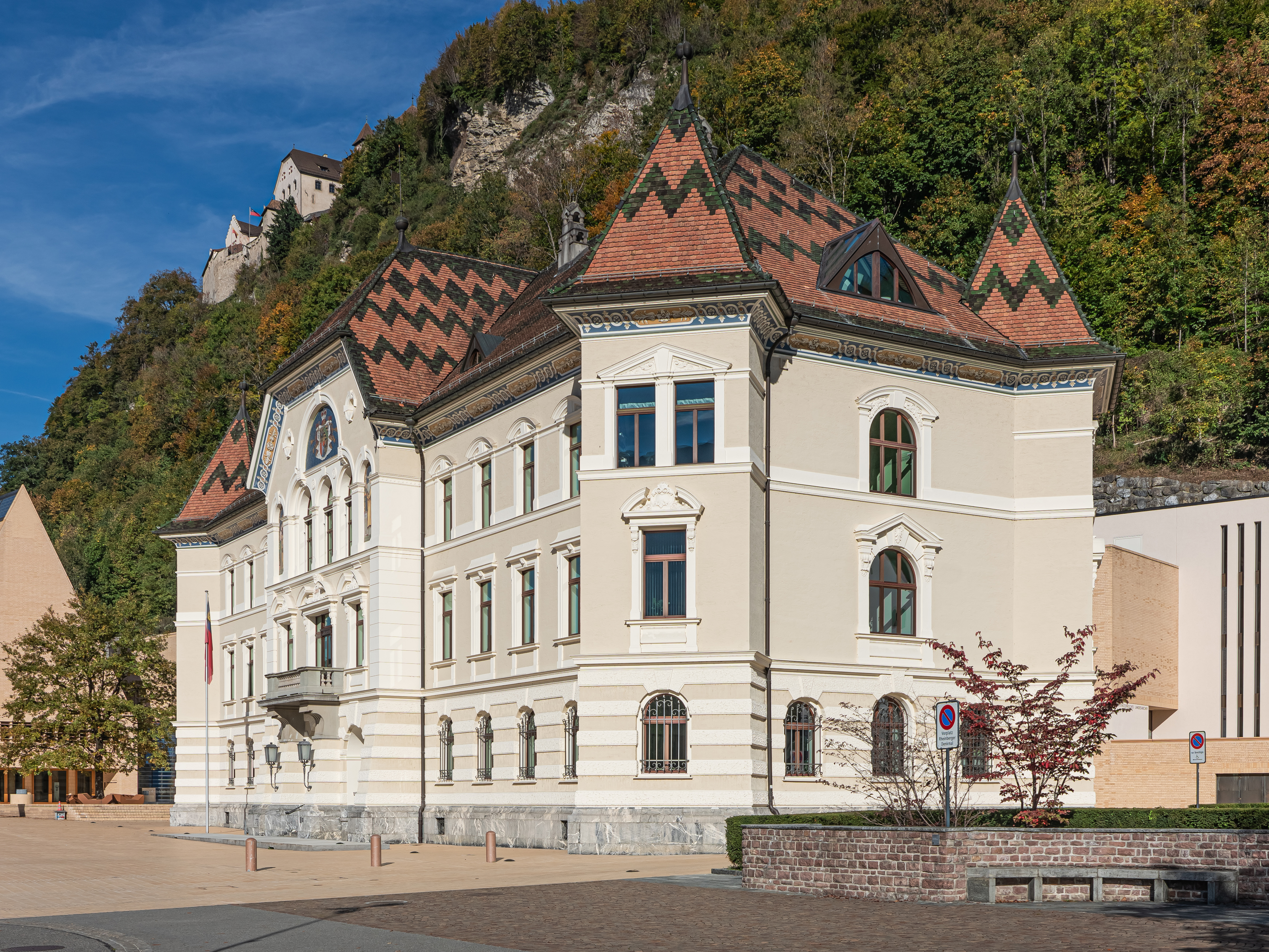
Government Building, Vaduz

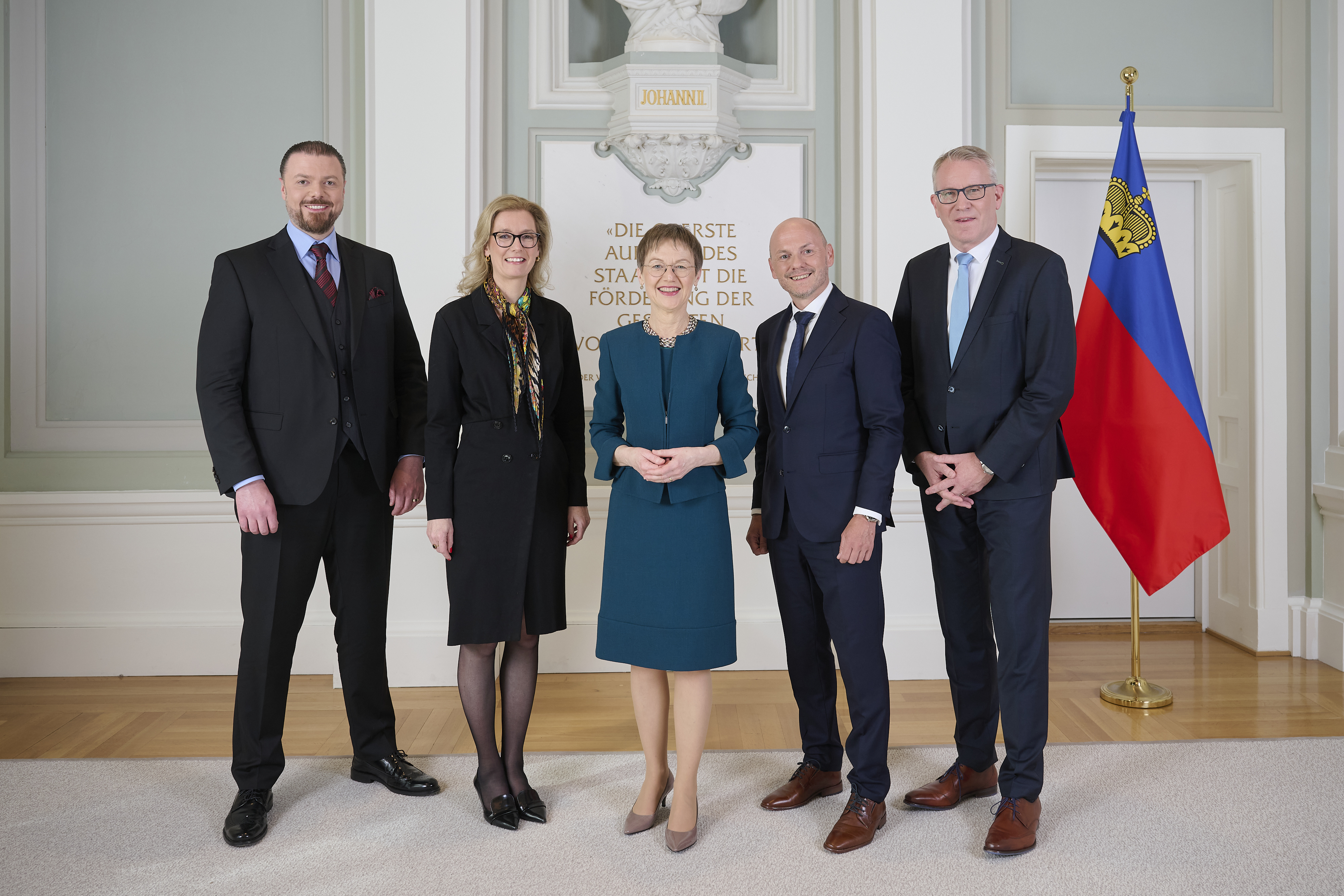
The government of Brigitte Haas, incumbent since April 2025

The government of Liechtenstein (German: Regierung von Liechtenstein) is the national cabinet and executive body of Liechtenstein. The government is chaired by the prime minister and consists of four government councillors, all of whom are also heads of specific government ministries. The seat of the government is located in the Government Building in Vaduz. Under the constitution, one government councillor is also appointed as the deputy prime minister. The members of government and their deputies are appointed by the prince after being elected by the Landtag of Liechtenstein (parliament of Liechtenstein) and are expected to command the confidence of both the prince and the Landtag. The prince can appoint a provisional government that may be in office for a maximum of four months without the consent of the Landtag. Councillors cannot be a member of the Landtag at the same time, although they should meet the eligibility requirements for that office. The governing party is typically the one with the most seats in the Landtag. Traditionally, Liechtenstein governments have been dominated by the Progressive Citizens' Party (FBP) and the Patriotic Union (VU) in various coalition governments, with the larger party occupying the role of prime minister and having more councillors, whereas the smaller party occupies the role of deputy prime minister and has fewer councillors.

Additionally, governments are entitled to equal representation with councillors from the electoral districts of Unterland and Oberland respectively. If a government councillor were to lose the confidence of the prince or Landtag, the decision on the loss of the authority of the councillor to exercise their functions shall be taken by mutual agreement of the prince and the Landtag. Until a new councillor has been appointed, the official duties of the Minister shall be performed by the councillor's deputy.

== Legislative branch ==
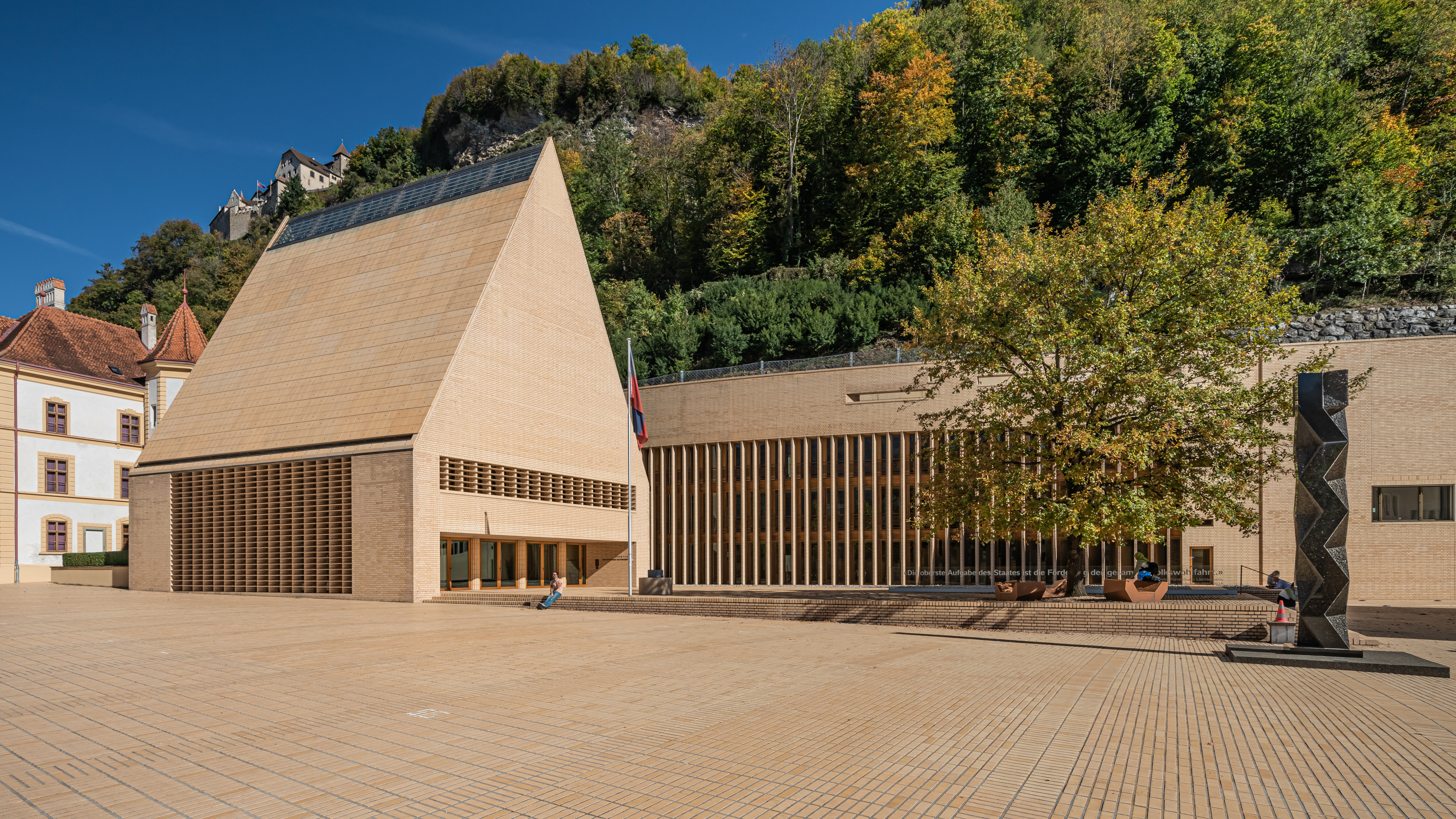
Landtag of Liechtenstein

The Prince's involvement in legislation consists in a right to take initiatives in the form of government bills and in the right to veto parliamentary proposals. The Prince has the power to enact princely decrees. Emergency princely decrees are possible when the security and welfare of the country is at stake. A countersignature by the head of government is, nevertheless, required. The Prince has the right to convene and adjourn parliament and, for serious reasons, to adjourn it for 3 months or to dissolve it.

The Landtag of Liechtenstein has 25 members, elected for a four-year term by proportional representation in two multi-seat constituencies. Until 1989, 15 members represented the population of the two constituencies (six for the lowland area and nine for the highland area). Since 1989 the lowland constituency has been entitled to have 10 members and the highland area 15. The Landtag's main task is to discuss and adopt resolutions on constitutional proposals and draft government bills. It has the additional duties of giving its assent to important international treaties; of electing members of the government, judges, and board members of the Principality's institutions; setting the annual budget and approving taxes and other public charges; and supervising the administration of the state. The Landtag observes its rights and duties in the course of sessions of the whole Landtag and through the parliamentary commissions that it elects. All members of the Landtag exercise their mandates in addition to their normal professions or occupations. The President of the Landtag and his deputy are both elected at the opening meeting for the current year. The president convenes the individual meetings during the session, leads them, and represent the Landtag externally. During the parliamentary recess — normally from January to February/March — a "state committee" assumes Parliament's duties, and such a committee must also be elected in the case of any adjournment or dissolution of Parliament. A "state committee" consists of the president of Parliament and four other members. The duties and working procedures of Parliament are laid down in the constitution and in Parliament's standing orders.

Moreover, the people of Liechtenstein have very strong direct democratic rights. If called for by at least 1,000 citizens, a referendum on any law can be initiated. Referendums can suspend parliament or change the constitution, but at least 1500 citizens must vote affirmative, so referendums to suspend parliament or change the constitution fail if they have low turnout even if the required percentage of total voters is met.

== Political parties and elections ==
The political parties are in practice politically decisive and are the moving forces with regard to the composition of the government. From 1938 to 1997 Liechtenstein had a style of continuous coalition governments between the FBP and VU. Until the February 1993 elections, the FBP and VU were the only parties in the Landtag. Liechtenstein's distinctive form of coalition government came to an end in April 1997, when the VU won a majority of seats and the FBP ended the coalition government; this continued after the 2001 elections with the FBP winning a majority and thus governing as a majority government. As the FBP lost its majority in the 2005 elections, the two parties have again since been in continuous coalition governments, most recently forming one following the VU's plurality of ten seats in the 2025 elections.

Liechtenstein's political system is generally considered a two-party system between the FBP and VU. While several minor parties have existed in Liechtenstein, the first one to successfully win representation in the Landtag was the Free List in the February 1993 elections. However, since the 2013 elections, which saw the rise of The Independents (DU) and thus four parties winning seats in the Landtag for the first time, the country has been considered to be moving towards a multi-party system – this trend has continued into the 2025 elections, with the Democrats for Liechtenstein winning six seats in the Landtag, the highest of any third party in Liechtenstein's history. Minority parties, as opposition parties, act as a check on the government in the Landtag and on parliamentary commissions. However, the VU and FBP still hold significant influence on a municipal level.

=== Last election ===
Results by municipality

The VU received 38.3% of the vote, a 2.7% increase from their 2021 performance, and maintained its ten seats in the Landtag. The FBP received 27.5% of the vote, an 8.4% decrease from 2021, and won seven seats, a decrease of three. It is the lowest result in the FBP's history. The DpL saw its vote share rise 11.1% to 23.3% from 2021 and won six seats, an increase of four, the highest of any third party in Liechtenstein's history. The Free List received 10.9% of the vote, a decrease of 2% from 2021, and won two seats, a decrease of one.

A total of 16,171 ballots were cast, resulting in a 76.3% voter turnout. The majority of votes (97%) were cast by post.

Party	Votes	%	Seats	+/–
Patriotic Union	79,478	38.32	10	0
Progressive Citizens' Party	56,983	27.48	7	–3
Democrats for Liechtenstein	48,370	23.32	6	+4
Free List	22,549	10.87	2	–1
Total	207,380	100.00	25	0
Valid votes	15,748	97.38		
Invalid/blank votes	423	2.62		
Total votes	16,171	100.00		
Registered voters/turnout	21,183	76.34		
Source: Landtagswahlen 2025

=== By electoral district ===
The elected 25 members of the Landtag consisted of 17 men and 8 women, the latter being the highest amount in Liechtenstein's history. The oldest member elected was Erich Hasler of the DpL at 68 years old, and the youngest was Lino Nägele of the FBP at 30.

Results by electoral district
Electoral district	Seats	Electorate	Party	Elected members	Subsititutes	Votes	%	Swing	Seats won	+/–
Oberland	15	13,137	Patriotic Union	Manfred Kaufmann; Christoph Wenaweser; Thomas Vogt; Dagmar Bühler-Nigsch; Roger Schädler; Carmen Heeb-Kindle	Markus Gstöhl; Marc Risch	58,725	39.2	▲2.3	6	0
Oberland	15	13,137	Progressive Citizens' Party	Sebastian Gassner; Daniel Seger; Daniel Salzgeber; Bettina Petzold-Mähr	Nadine Vogelsang	38,352	25.6	▼9.1	4	▼2
Oberland	15	13,137	Democrats for Liechtenstein	Thomas Rehak; Marion Kindle-Kühnis; Achim Vogt; Martin Seger	Oliver Indra	35,695	23.8	▲14.2	4	▲3
Oberland	15	13,137	Free List	Manuela Haldner-Schierscher	Benjamin Risch	16,928	11.3	▼2.4	1	▼1
Unterland	10	7,247	Patriotic Union	Stefan Öhri; Dietmar Hasler; Johannes Zimmermann; Tanja Cissé	Mario Wohlwend	20,753	36.0	▲2.3	4	0
Unterland	10	7,247	Progressive Citizens' Party	Johannes Kaiser; Franziska Hoop; Lino Nägele	Helmut Hasler	18,631	32.3	▼6.6	3	▼1
Unterland	10	7,247	Democrats for Liechtenstein	Erich Hasler; Simon Schächle	Brigit Elkuch	12,675	22.0	▲6.9	2	▲1
Unterland	10	7,247	Free List	Sandra Fausch	Patrick Risch	5,621	9.7	▼1.0	1	0
Source: Landtagswahlen 2025

=== Votes by candidate ===
Constituency	Party	Candidate	Votes
Oberland	Patriotic Union	Manfred Kaufmann	4,444
Oberland	Patriotic Union	Christoph Wenaweser	3,839
Oberland	Patriotic Union	Dagmar Bühler-Nigsch	3,758
Oberland	Patriotic Union	Thomas Vogt	3,751
Oberland	Patriotic Union	Roger Schädler	3,639
Oberland	Patriotic Union	Carmen Heeb-Kindle	3,596
Oberland	Patriotic Union	Markus Gstöhl	3,533
Oberland	Patriotic Union	Marc Risch	3,407
Oberland	Patriotic Union	Andreas Good	3,363
Oberland	Patriotic Union	Norma Heidegger	3,363
Oberland	Patriotic Union	Renate Feger	3,355
Oberland	Patriotic Union	Daniela Ospelt	3,331
Oberland	Patriotic Union	Thomas Hagmann	3,138
Oberland	Patriotic Union	Roland Moser	2,962
Oberland	Patriotic Union	Thomas Keller	2,742
Oberland	Progressive Citizens' Party	Sebastian Gassner	2,823
Oberland	Progressive Citizens' Party	Daniel Seger	2,622
Oberland	Progressive Citizens' Party	Daniel Salzgeber	2,549
Oberland	Progressive Citizens' Party	Bettina Petzold-Mähr	2,525
Oberland	Progressive Citizens' Party	Nadine Vogelsang	2,403
Oberland	Progressive Citizens' Party	Lorenz Risch	2,373
Oberland	Progressive Citizens' Party	Sascha Quaderer	2,315
Oberland	Progressive Citizens' Party	Florin Konrad	2,286
Oberland	Progressive Citizens' Party	Judith Hoop	2,278
Oberland	Progressive Citizens' Party	Martin Rechsteiner	2,239
Oberland	Progressive Citizens' Party	Oliver Gerstgrasser	1,947
Oberland	Progressive Citizens' Party	Manfred Bischof	1,916
Oberland	Progressive Citizens' Party	Daniel Brunhart	1,891
Oberland	Progressive Citizens' Party	Bruno Beck	1,884
Oberland	Progressive Citizens' Party	Kilian Büchel	1,814
Oberland	Democrats for Liechtenstein	Thomas Rehak	3,225
Oberland	Democrats for Liechtenstein	Marion Kindle-Kühnis	2,959
Oberland	Democrats for Liechtenstein	Achim Vogt	2,794
Oberland	Democrats for Liechtenstein	Martin Seger	2,534
Oberland	Democrats for Liechtenstein	Oliver Indra	2,274
Oberland	Democrats for Liechtenstein	Isabella Fischer	2,103
Oberland	Free List	Manuela Haldner-Schierscher	1,606
Oberland	Free List	Benjamin Risch	1,509
Oberland	Free List	Tatjana As'Ad	1,490
Oberland	Free List	Samuel Schurte	1,246
Oberland	Free List	Stefan Sprenger	1,148
Oberland	Free List	Gustav Kaufmann	1,036
Unterland	Patriotic Union	Stefan Öhri	2,133
Unterland	Patriotic Union	Dietmar Hasler	2,020
Unterland	Patriotic Union	Johannes Zimmermann	1,967
Unterland	Patriotic Union	Tanja Cissé	1,950
Unterland	Patriotic Union	Mario Wohlwend	1,904
Unterland	Patriotic Union	Yannick Ritter	1,839
Unterland	Patriotic Union	Tatjana Ketz	1,819
Unterland	Patriotic Union	Elias Jehle	1,782
Unterland	Patriotic Union	Corrine Thöny-Gritsch	1,689
Unterland	Patriotic Union	Markus Schaper	1,501
Unterland	Progressive Citizens' Party	Johannes Kaiser	2,052
Unterland	Progressive Citizens' Party	Franziska Hoop	1,771
Unterland	Progressive Citizens' Party	Lino Nägele	1,738
Unterland	Progressive Citizens' Party	Helmut Hasler	1,642
Unterland	Progressive Citizens' Party	Karin Zech-Hoop	1,609
Unterland	Progressive Citizens' Party	Ivan Schurte	1,589
Unterland	Progressive Citizens' Party	Fabian Haltinner	1,534
Unterland	Progressive Citizens' Party	Andreas Haber	1,513
Unterland	Progressive Citizens' Party	Nico Büchel	1,465
Unterland	Progressive Citizens' Party	Sieglinde Kieber	1,407
Unterland	Democrats for Liechtenstein	Erich Hasler	1,700
Unterland	Democrats for Liechtenstein	Simon Schächle	1,565
Unterland	Democrats for Liechtenstein	Brigit Elkuch	1,507
Unterland	Democrats for Liechtenstein	Manuela Hasler	1,265
Unterland	Free List	Sandra Fausch	867
Unterland	Free List	Patrick Risch	848
Unterland	Free List	Valentin Ritter	730

== Judicial branch ==
The main part of the Judicial Branch of Liechtenstein is made up of the Supreme Court (German: Oberster Gerichtshof), the Princely Court of Appeals (German: Fürstliches Obergericht, lit. 'Princely Higher Court'), and the Princely Court of Justice (German: Fürstliches Landgericht, lit. 'Princely Land Court').

In the sphere of administrative law, there is also the Administrative Court, and in the sphere of constitutional law there is the State Court.

== Administrative divisions ==
Liechtenstein is divided into eleven communes (German: Gemeinden); Balzers, Eschen, Gamprin, Mauren, Planken, Ruggell, Schaan, Schellenberg, Triesen, Triesenberg, and Vaduz.

=== Municipalities ===
Municipalities of Liechtenstein are entitled under the constitution to secede from the union by majority vote.

The autonomy of the Liechtenstein communities is in the upper range compared to the other Central European states along with Switzerland. Despite their small size, the municipalities have complex forms in terms of their territorial extent: in addition to a main part, seven municipalities also include one or more exclaves. Citizens' cooperatives, which exist in about half of Liechtenstein's municipalities, own forests and pastures for collective use, as well as parceled areas that are left for private use.

The municipalities of Liechtenstein are divided between the two electoral districts of Unterland and Oberland. This division is historical; the Unterland depends on Schellenberg, the Oberland on the county of Vaduz.

== International organization participation ==
Liechtenstein is a member of the following organizations:

- Council of Europe
- EBRD
- U.N. Economic Commission for Europe
- European Free Trade Association
- International Atomic Energy Agency
- International Criminal Court
- ICRM
- IFRCS
- Intelsat, Interpol
- International Olympic Committee
- ITU
- OPCW
- Organization for Security and Co-Operation in Europe
- PCA
- United Nations
- UNCTAD
- Universal Postal Union, WCL
- World Intellectual Property Organization
- World Trade Organization
