= List of members of the Landtag of Liechtenstein (2025–2029) =

Members of the Landtag of Liechtenstein in the 49th legislature

2025–2029 Landtag of Liechtenstein
←	2021–2025 Landtag	2029–2033 Landtag	→
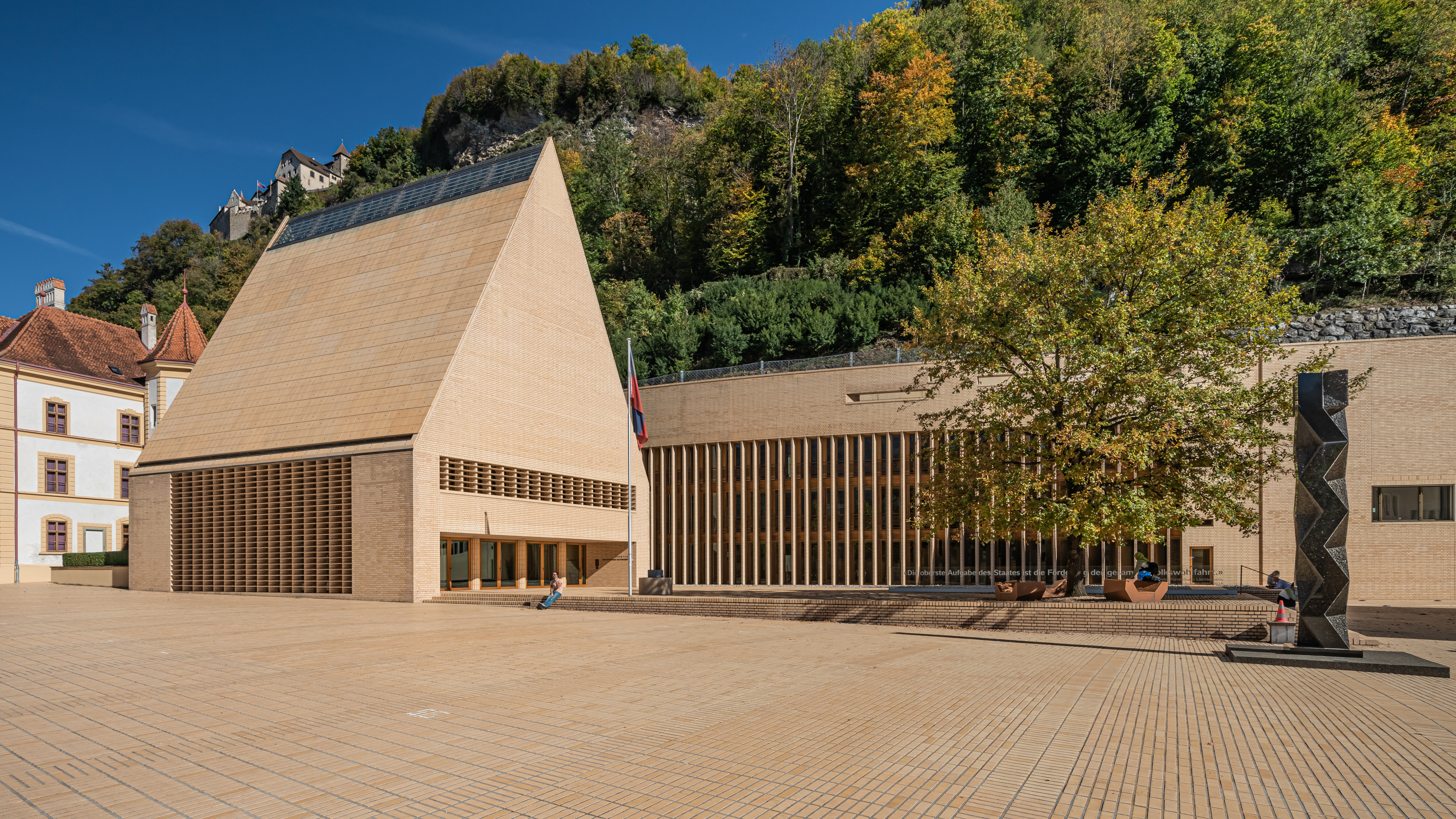
- Landtag building of Liechtenstein

Overview
- Term: 9 February 2025 – 2029
- Election: 2025 Liechtenstein general election
- Government: Brigitte Haas cabinet

Landtag of Liechtenstein
- Members: 25
- President: Manfred Kaufmann
- Vice president: Franziska Hoop
- Prime minister: Brigitte Haas
- Deputy prime minister: Sabine Monauni

Prince Hans-Adam II Alois (regent)

The 2025 Liechtenstein general election was held on 9 February 2025 to elect the 25 members of the Landtag. It is the 49th legislative term, and is expected to end in 2029.

The Landtag consists of the elected members, who then elect the president and the government. Of the 25 elected, 12 are newcomers and 8 are women. Under the composition, the Patriotic Union (VU) hold a plurality of ten seats. The VU and Progressive Citizens' Party (FBP) formed a coalition government under Brigitte Haas of the VU.

== Composition ==
Party	Seats
Patriotic Union	10
Progressive Citizens' Party	7
Democrats for Liechtenstein	6
Free List	2
Total	25
Source: Landtagswahlen 2025

== List of members ==
Constituency	Municipality	Affiliation	Image	Name	Notes
Oberland	Balzers	Patriotic Union		Manfred Kaufmann	President of the Landtag
Oberland	Triesen	Patriotic Union		Thomas Vogt	
Oberland	Triesenberg	Patriotic Union		Dagamr Bühler-Nigsch	
Oberland	Schaan	Patriotic Union		Christoph Wenaweser	
Oberland	Balzers	Patriotic Union		Carmen Heeb-Kindle	Newcomer
Oberland	Triesenberg	Patriotic Union		Roger Schädler	Newcomer
Oberland	Triesenberg	Progressive Citizens' Party		Sebastian Gassner	
Oberland	Vaduz	Progressive Citizens' Party		Daniel Seger	
Oberland	Triesen	Progressive Citizens' Party		Daniel Salzgeber	Newcomer
Oberland	Planken	Progressive Citizens' Party		Bettina Petzold-Mähr	
Oberland	Triesen	Democrats for Liechtenstein		Thomas Rehak	
Oberland	Triesen	Democrats for Liechtenstein		Marion Kindle-Kühnis	Newcomer
Oberland	Triesenberg	Democrats for Liechtenstein		Joachim Vogt	Newcomer
Oberland	Schaan	Democrats for Liechtenstein		Martin Seger	Newcomer
Oberland	Schaan	Free List		Manuela Haldner-Schierscher	
Unterland	Eschen	Patriotic Union		Tanja Cissé	Newcomer
Unterland	Gamprin	Patriotic Union		Dietmar Hasler	Newcomer
Unterland	Eschen	Patriotic Union		Johannes Zimmermann	Newcomer
Unterland	Mauren	Patriotic Union		Stefan Öhri	Newcomer
Unterland	Ruggell	Progressive Citizens' Party		Franziska Hoop	Vice president of the Landtag
Unterland	Schellenberg	Progressive Citizens' Party		Johannes Kaiser	
Unterland	Eschen	Progressive Citizens' Party		Lino Nägele	Newcomer
Unterland	Schellenberg	Democrats for Liechtenstein		Erich Hasler	
Unterland	Schellenberg	Democrats for Liechtenstein		Simon Schächle	Newcomer
Unterland	Schellenberg	Free List		Sandra Fausch	
