= List of members of the Landtag of Liechtenstein (2021–2025) =

Members of the Landtag of Liechtenstein in the 48th legislature

2021–2025 Landtag of Liechtenstein
←	2017–2021 Landtag	2025–2029 Landtag	→
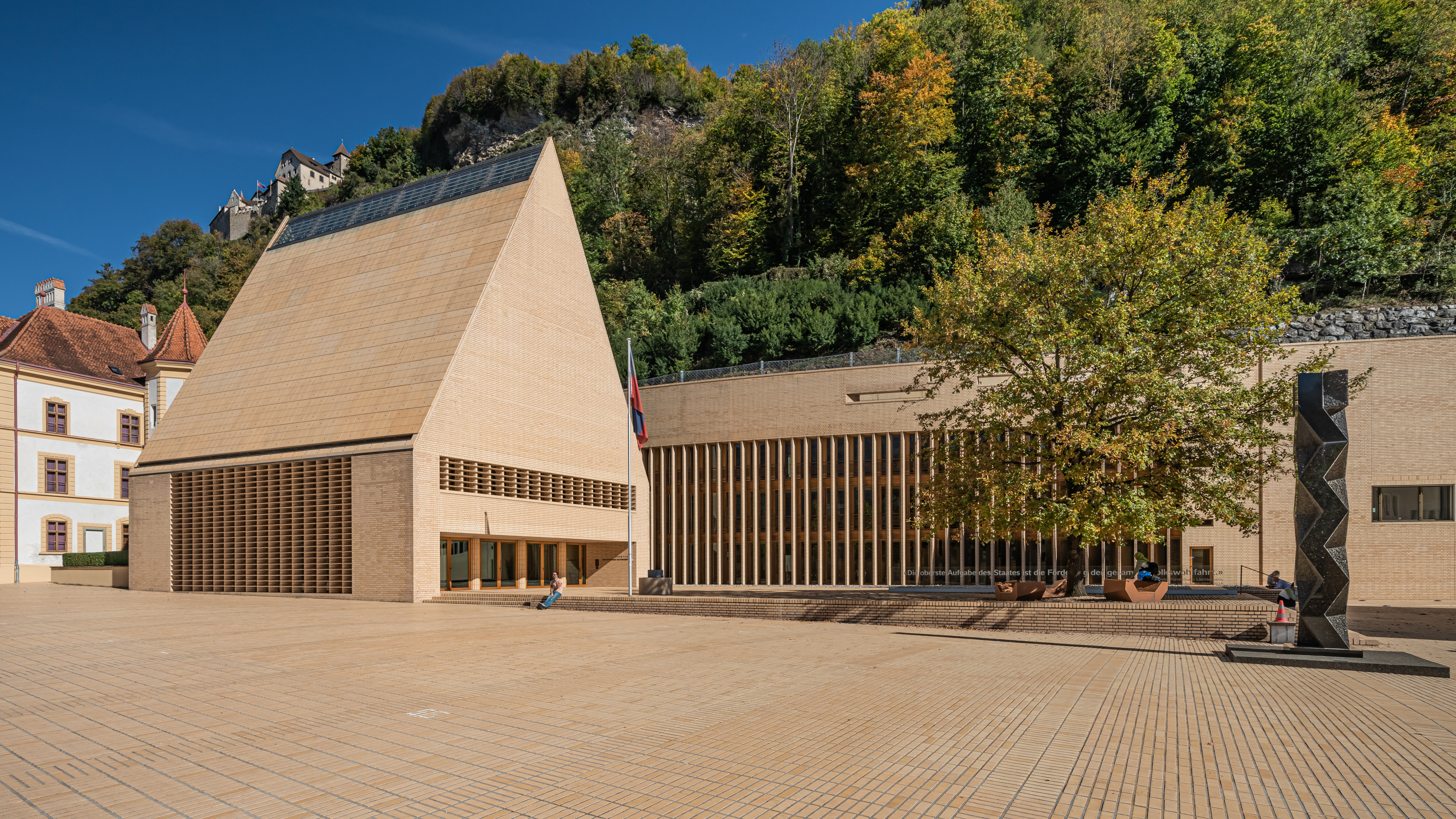
- Landtag building of Liechtenstein

Overview
- Term: 7 February 2021 – 9 February 2025
- Election: 2021 Liechtenstein general election
- Government: Daniel Risch cabinet

Landtag of Liechtenstein
- Members: 25
- President: Albert Frick
- Vice president: Gunilla Marxer-Kranz
- Prime minister: Daniel Risch
- Deputy prime minister: Sabine Monauni

Prince Hans-Adam II Alois (regent)

The 2021 Liechtenstein general election was held on 7 February 2021 to elect the 25 members of the Landtag. It was the 48th legislative term, and ended on 9 February 2025.

The Landtag consists of the elected members, who then elect the president and the government. Of the 25 elected, 11 were newcomers, and 7 were women. Under the composition, both the Patriotic Union (VU) and Progressive Citizens' Party (FBP) held an equal ten seats, resulting in the two parties forming a coalition government ultimately under Daniel Risch of the VU.

== Composition ==
Party	Seats
Patriotic Union	10
Progressive Citizens' Party	10
Free List	3
Democrats for Liechtenstein	2
Total	25
Source: Landtagswahlen 2021

== List of members ==
Constituency	Municipality	Affiliation	Image	Name	Notes
Oberland	Balzers	Patriotic Union		Manfred Kaufmann	
Oberland	Triesen	Patriotic Union		Thomas Vogt	
Oberland	Triesenberg	Patriotic Union		Dagamr Bühler-Nigsch	Newcomer
Oberland	Balzers	Patriotic Union		Günter Vogt	
Oberland	Schaan	Patriotic Union		Walter Frick	Newcomer
Oberland	Triesen	Patriotic Union	148x148	Norma Heidegger	Newcomer
Oberland	Triesenberg	Progressive Citizens' Party		Sebastian Gassner	Newcomer
Oberland	Schaan	Progressive Citizens' Party		Daniel Seger	
Oberland	Triesenberg	Progressive Citizens' Party		Wendelin Lampert	
Oberland	Schaan	Progressive Citizens' Party		Albert Frick	President of the Landtag
Oberland	Planken	Progressive Citizens' Party		Sascha Quaderer	Newcomer
Oberland	Planken	Progressive Citizens' Party		Bettina Petzold-Mähr	Newcomer
Oberland	Schaan	Free List		Georg Kaufmann	
Oberland	Schaan	Free List		Manuela Haldner-Schierscher	Newcomer
Oberland	Triesen	Democrats for Liechtenstein		Thomas Rehak	
Unterland	Eschen	Patriotic Union		Gunilla Marxer-Kranz	Vice president of the Landtag
Unterland	Mauren	Patriotic Union		Peter Frick	Newcomer
Unterland	Ruggell	Patriotic Union		Mario Wohlwend	
Unterland	Schellenberg	Patriotic Union		Dietmar Lampert	Newcomer
Unterland	Ruggell	Progressive Citizens' Party		Franziska Hoop	Newcomer
Unterland	Schellenberg	Progressive Citizens' Party		Johannes Kaiser	
Unterland	Eschen	Progressive Citizens' Party		Daniel Oehry	
Unterland	Eschen	Progressive Citizens' Party		Karin Zech-Hoop	Newcomer
Unterland	Schellenberg	Free List		Patrick Risch	
Unterland	Schellenberg	Democrats for Liechtenstein		Herbert Elkuch	
