= 2025 Liechtenstein general election =

- 9 February 2025
- All 25 seats in the Landtag; 13 seats needed for a majority
- Turnout: 76.34% (▼1.67pp)
Party	Leader	Vote %	Seats	+/–
VU	Brigitte Haas	38.32	10	0
FBP	Ernst Walch	27.48	7	−3
DpL	Thomas Rehak	23.32	6	+4
FL	Manuela Haldner-Schierscher (Note: While the Free List has no one official leader, operating instead with an Executive committee, Haldner-Schierscher has been referred to as their de facto leader.)	10.87	2	−1
This lists parties that won seats. See the complete results below.
Vote share by municipality
Prime Minister before	Prime Minister after
Daniel Risch; VU	Brigitte Haas; VU

General elections were held in Liechtenstein on 9 February 2025 to elect the 25 members of the Landtag. The Patriotic Union (VU) won a plurality of 10 seats, while the Progressive Citizens' Party (FBP) won seven, the lowest in its history. The Democrats for Liechtenstein (DpL) won six seats, being the highest amount of seats won by a third party in Liechtenstein's history. The Free List (FL) won two seats. The voter turnout was 76.3%.

Incumbent prime minister, Daniel Risch, did not run for re-election. The VU nominated Brigitte Haas for prime minister, while the FBP nominated Ernst Walch for the position. The DpL nominated Thomas Rehak and Erich Hasler as government candidates. Following the election, the VU and FBP entered into a renewed coalition government. The new government was sworn in on 10 April 2025, ultimately under the leadership of Haas. Haas is the first female prime minister in Liechtenstein's history, and also the oldest.

== Background ==
In the 2021 Liechtenstein general election, the Patriotic Union (VU) and Progressive Citizens' Party (FBP) each won ten seats. As a result, the two parties formed a coalition government, ultimately under Daniel Risch. The Free List and Democrats for Liechtenstein (DpL) won three and two seats in 2021 respectively. A new political party, Mensch im Mittelpunkt, was formed in 2022.

Risch's government was characterized by efforts for increased environmental protection in Liechtenstein and greater international participation. It led Liechtenstein's response to Russian invasion of Ukraine starting in February 2022 and successfully negotiated Liechtenstein joining the International Monetary Fund (IMF), which took place in October 2024.

== Electoral system ==
The 25 members of the Landtag are elected by open list proportional representation from two constituencies, Oberland with 15 seats and Unterland with 10 seats. Voters voted for a party list and then may have struck through candidates for whom they did not wish to cast a preferential vote, and may also have added names of candidates from other lists. The electoral threshold to win a seat was 8%. Landtag members sit for a four-year term. Once formed, the Landtag elected the prime minister and two government councillors who were then appointed by the reigning prince to govern in a cabinet. Voting was compulsory by law, and those who failed to vote without a valid reason may be fined, but it was not enforced. Polling stations were open only for one and a half hours on election day. Citizens over 18 years of age who had been resident in the country for at least one month prior to election day were eligible to vote.

On 25 February 2024, Liechtenstein voters were asked in a referendum if members of government should be directly elected, a proposal that would have affected the 2025 general election if successful. However, the proposal was rejected by voters.

== Campaign ==
=== Main parties ===
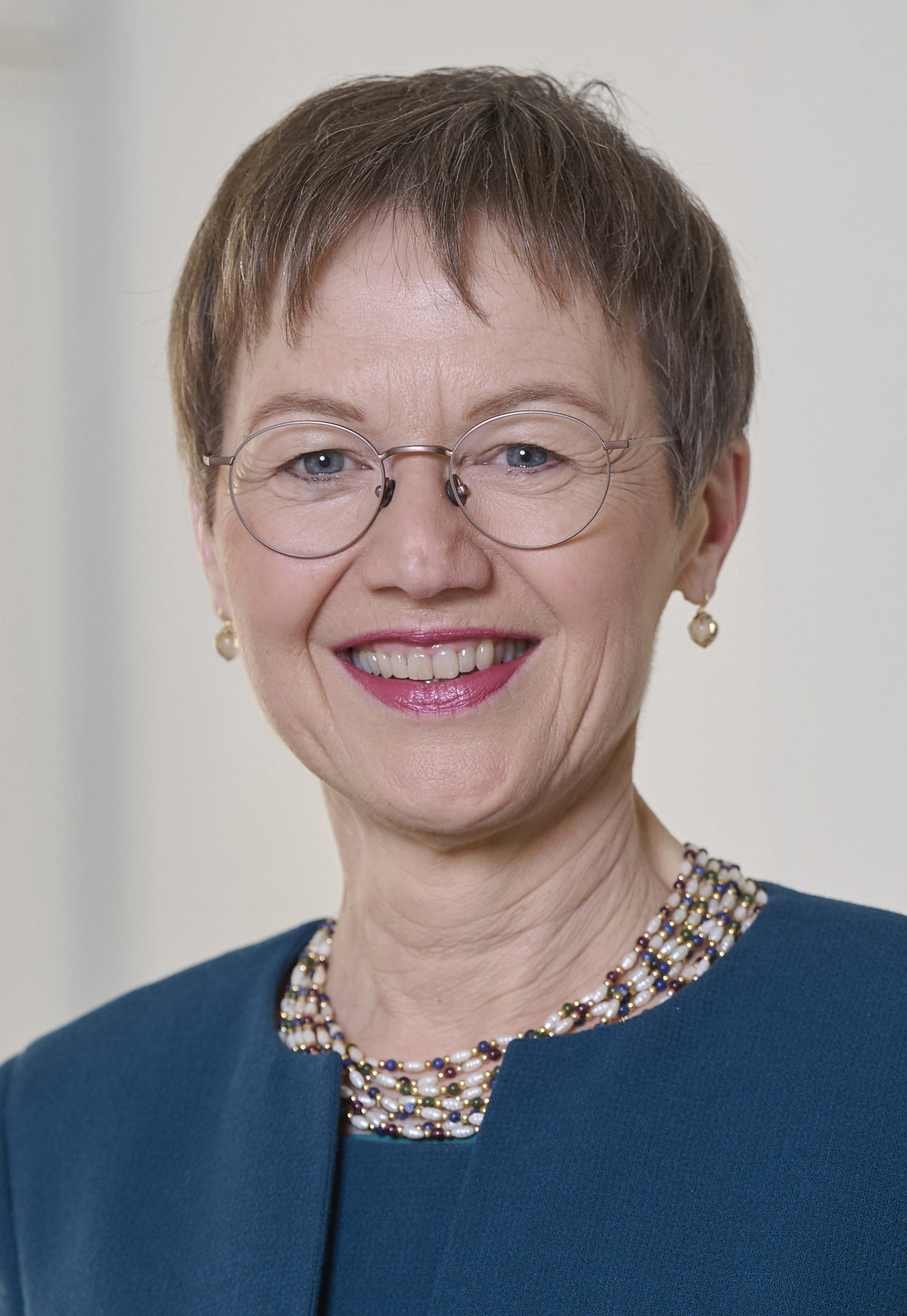
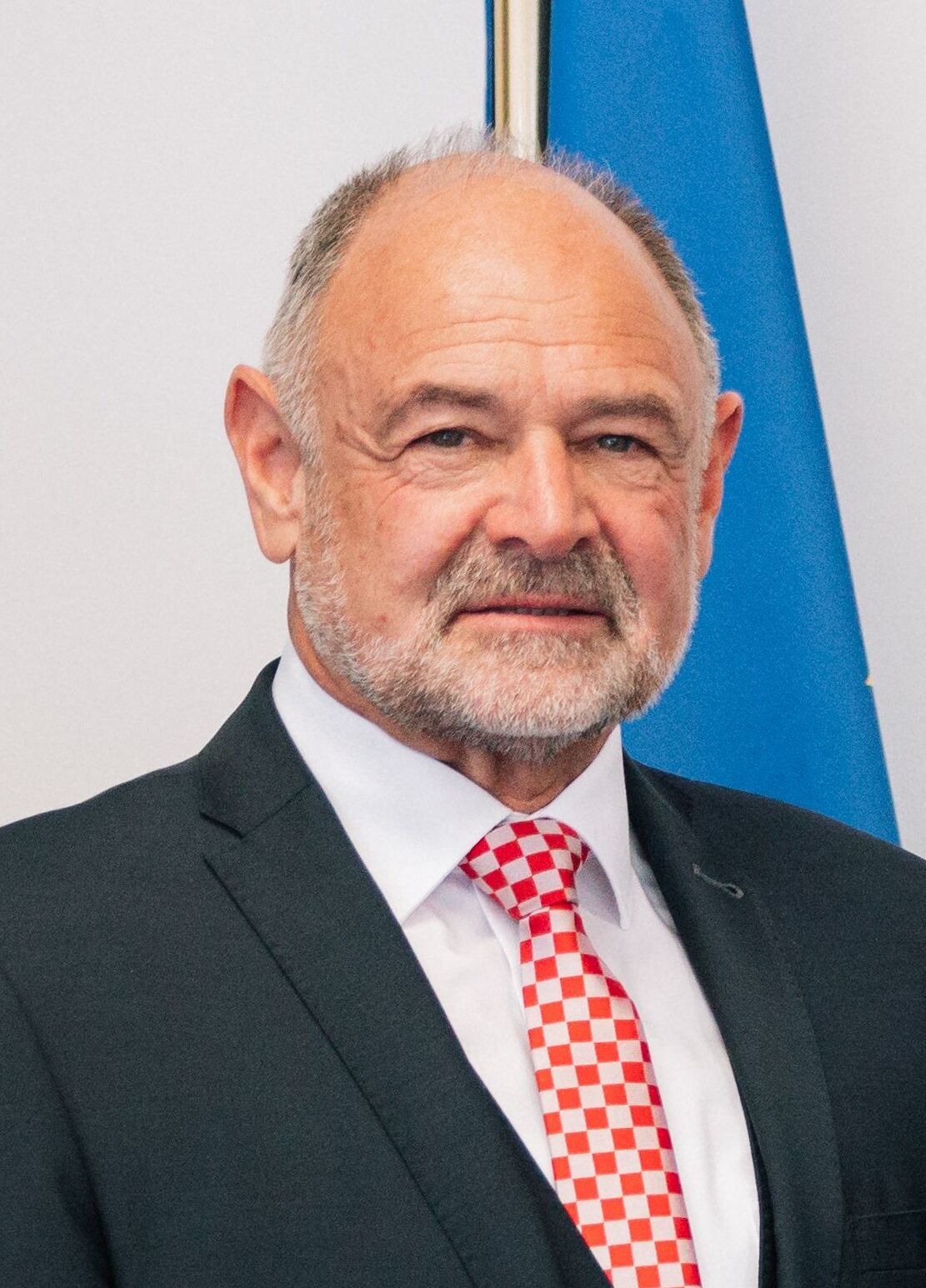
Brigitte Haas (left) and Ernst Walch (right) were the VU and FBP's respective nominations for prime minister

On 19 February 2024, Daniel Risch declared his intention to not seek re-election. The VU nominated Brigitte Haas for prime minister, being the second woman nominated for the position, behind Sabine Monauni in 2021. The party also nominated Hubert Büchel and Emanuel Schädler as government candidates. Haas stated that she was "available" for multiple terms if elected. The VU's programme included policies such as reducing healthcare costs, economic growth, environmental protection, and expanding infrastructure.

On 13 August 2024, the FBP nominated former President of the Landtag and foreign minister Ernst Walch for prime minister. The party also nominated incumbent deputy prime minister Sabine Monauni and then-party president Daniel Oehry as government candidates. At 68 years old, Walch is the oldest candidate in Liechtenstein's history. Walch's nomination, alongside Alexander Batliner becoming party president the same month, was described by the newspaper Liechtensteiner Vaterland as the "conservative wing taking over again". Walch declared his intention to only serve one term as prime minister should he have been elected. In an interview with 1FLTV, incumbent President of the Landtag, Albert Frick, belonging to the FBP, also announced that he would not be running for re-election. The FBP's programme included policies such as reducing deficit spending, a social market economy, reducing healthcare costs, greater school autonomy, and long-term financial security for the Old-age and survivors insurance in Liechtenstein.

According to an October 2024 survey, only 48% of respondents wanted a government that included Walch, being the lowest of any candidate. On 29 January 2025, the German newspaper Die Zeit published an article regarding Walch; in the article, it criticized his activities as a trustee and his actions as foreign minister, highlighting his involvement in numerous scandals from that time, stating that "Liechtenstein's dark past will catch up with it".

In February 2024, the Vaterland conducted a survey which suggested that only 25% of respondents would support another coalition government between the VU and FBP. The FBP declared that it was open to the formation of a coalition should it have won the election; Haas also stated that she was open to a formation of a coalition with the FBP, but was sceptical of other parties.

=== Opposition parties ===
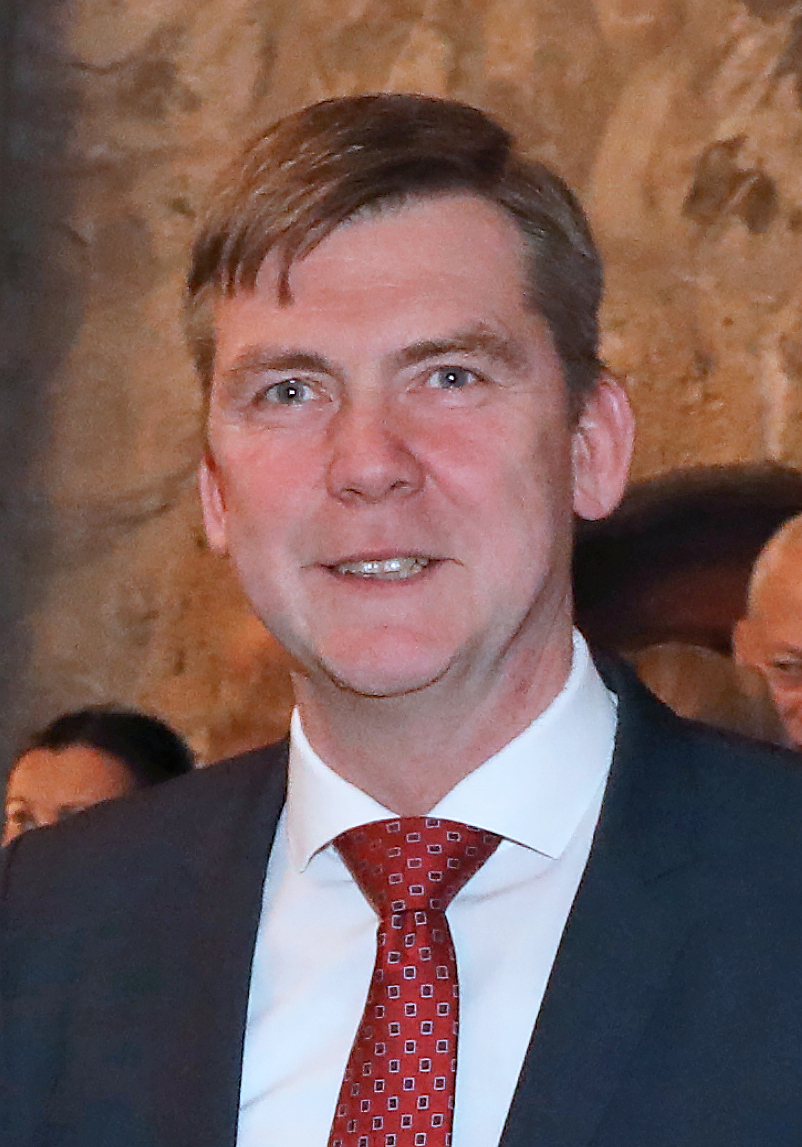
Thomas Rehak

The Democrats for Liechtenstein nominated Thomas Rehak and Erich Hasler for government positions on 16 December 2024, being the first time the party presented government candidates since its formation in 2018. They said that they were open to a coalition with other parties. During campaigning, Rehak suggested the possibility of a three-party coalition, stating that the DpL "had a right to a seat in government". According to polling, the party was predicted to receive a significantly increased share of the vote compared to 2021, perhaps as high as 20%. The party's programme included policies such as free public transport for the young and elderly, restricting the status of refugees from Ukraine, additional requirements for naturalization in Liechtenstein, reduced bureaucracy in healthcare and tax cuts.

The Free List presented its Landtag candidates on 15 and 29 November 2024. The party did not present any government candidates, but it also stated that it did not rule out participation in government. The party's programme included policies such as family medicine, affordable housing, and environmental protection being included as a fundamental right in the constitution. Mensch Im Mittelpunkt renounced any candidates in December 2024.

=== Procedure ===
Election campaigning is largely unregulated and carried out via social media, newspapers and broadcast media. All parties are permitted to post an official campaign video on the websites of the main newspapers in the country. The elections are the second to be carried out under the 2019 Law on Payment of Contributions to Political Parties, which limited public funding to registered political parties, banned large anonymous donations and required the publication of accounts by parties.

== Opinion polls ==
Opinion polls
Source	Date	VU	FBP	FL	DpL	DU	MiM	Other
Demoscope	16 December 2024	34%	33%	12%	16%	—	—	1%
Demoscope	22 October 2024	31%	31%	9%	17%	—	—	1%
Demoscope	20 June 2024	25%	23%	14%	23%	—	—	—
Vaterland	13 July 2023	14.70%	16.19%	5.17%	41.46%	0.71%	14.75%	7.02%

== Candidates ==
Candidates have the same eligibility criteria as voters. Political parties must have the support of 30 voters from a constituency to be eligible to nominate a candidate list in it. The date for presenting Landtag candidates was set for 6 December 2024. A total of 69 candidates contested the election; 48 men and 21 women.

Candidates
Party District	FBP	VU	FL	DpL
Oberland	Daniel Brunhart; Martin Rechsteiner; Sascha Quaderer; Bettina Petzold-Mähr; Sebastian Gassner; Bruno Beck; Judith Hoop; Nadine Vogelsang; Florin Konrad; Oliver Gerstgrasser; Daniel Seger; Manfred Bischof; Lorenz Risch; Daniel Salzgeber; Kilian Büchel	Daniela Ospelt; Roland Moser; Thomas Keller; Thomas Hagmann; Marc Risch; Christoph Wenaweser; Roger Schädler; Renate Feger; Dagmar Bühler-Nigsch; Thomas Vogt; Norma Heidegger; Markus Gstöhl; Manfred Kaufmann; Carmen Heeb-Kindle; Andreas Good	Benjamin Risch; Manuela Haldner-Schierscher; Samuel Schurte; Stefan Sprenger; Tatjana As'Ad; Gustav Kaufmann	Isabella Fischer; Oliver Indra; Marion Kindle-Kühnis; Thomas Rehak; Martin Seger; Achim Vogt
Unterland	Fabian Haltinner; Franziska Hoop; Nico Büchel; Karin Zech-Hoop; Lino Nägele; Iwan Schurte; Sieglinde Kieber; Andreas Haber; Johannes Kaiser; Helmut Hasler	Mario Wohlwend; Markus Schaper; Tanja Cissé; Elias Jehle; Johannes Zimmermann; Yannick Ritter; Stefan Öhri; Thöny-Gritsch; Tatjana Ketz; Dietmar Hasler	Patrick Risch; Sandra Fausch; Valentin Ritter	Brigit Elkuch; Erich Hasler; Manuela Hasler; Simon Schächle
Source: Landtagswahlen 2025

== Results ==
Results by municipality

The VU received 38.3% of the vote, a 2.7% increase from their 2021 performance, and maintained its ten seats in the Landtag. The FBP received 27.5% of the vote, an 8.4% decrease from 2021, and won seven seats, a decrease of three. It is the lowest result in the FBP's history. The DpL saw its vote share rise 11.1% to 23.3% from 2021 and won six seats, an increase of four, the highest of any third party in Liechtenstein's history. The Free List received 10.9% of the vote, a decrease of 2% from 2021, and won two seats, a decrease of one.

A total of 16,171 ballots were cast, resulting in a 76.3% voter turnout. The majority of votes (97%) were cast by post.

Party	Votes	%	Seats	+/–
Patriotic Union	79,478	38.32	10	0
Progressive Citizens' Party	56,983	27.48	7	–3
Democrats for Liechtenstein	48,370	23.32	6	+4
Free List	22,549	10.87	2	–1
Total	207,380	100.00	25	0
Valid votes	15,748	97.38		
Invalid/blank votes	423	2.62		
Total votes	16,171	100.00		
Registered voters/turnout	21,183	76.34		
Source: Landtagswahlen 2025

=== By electoral district ===
The elected 25 members of the Landtag consisted of 17 men and 8 women, the latter being the highest amount in Liechtenstein's history. The oldest member elected was Erich Hasler of the DpL at 68 years old, and the youngest was Lino Nägele of the FBP at 30.

Results by electoral district
Electoral district	Seats	Electorate	Party	Elected members	Subsititutes	Votes	%	Swing	Seats won	+/–
Oberland	15	13,137	Patriotic Union	Manfred Kaufmann; Christoph Wenaweser; Thomas Vogt; Dagmar Bühler-Nigsch; Roger Schädler; Carmen Heeb-Kindle	Markus Gstöhl; Marc Risch	58,725	39.2	▲2.3	6	0
Oberland	15	13,137	Progressive Citizens' Party	Sebastian Gassner; Daniel Seger; Daniel Salzgeber; Bettina Petzold-Mähr	Nadine Vogelsang	38,352	25.6	▼9.1	4	▼2
Oberland	15	13,137	Democrats for Liechtenstein	Thomas Rehak; Marion Kindle-Kühnis; Achim Vogt; Martin Seger	Oliver Indra	35,695	23.8	▲14.2	4	▲3
Oberland	15	13,137	Free List	Manuela Haldner-Schierscher	Benjamin Risch	16,928	11.3	▼2.4	1	▼1
Unterland	10	7,247	Patriotic Union	Stefan Öhri; Dietmar Hasler; Johannes Zimmermann; Tanja Cissé	Mario Wohlwend	20,753	36.0	▲2.3	4	0
Unterland	10	7,247	Progressive Citizens' Party	Johannes Kaiser; Franziska Hoop; Lino Nägele	Helmut Hasler	18,631	32.3	▼6.6	3	▼1
Unterland	10	7,247	Democrats for Liechtenstein	Erich Hasler; Simon Schächle	Brigit Elkuch	12,675	22.0	▲6.9	2	▲1
Unterland	10	7,247	Free List	Sandra Fausch	Patrick Risch	5,621	9.7	▼1.0	1	0
Source: Landtagswahlen 2025

=== Votes by candidate ===
Constituency	Party	Candidate	Votes
Oberland	Patriotic Union	Manfred Kaufmann	4,444
Oberland	Patriotic Union	Christoph Wenaweser	3,839
Oberland	Patriotic Union	Dagmar Bühler-Nigsch	3,758
Oberland	Patriotic Union	Thomas Vogt	3,751
Oberland	Patriotic Union	Roger Schädler	3,639
Oberland	Patriotic Union	Carmen Heeb-Kindle	3,596
Oberland	Patriotic Union	Markus Gstöhl	3,533
Oberland	Patriotic Union	Marc Risch	3,407
Oberland	Patriotic Union	Andreas Good	3,363
Oberland	Patriotic Union	Norma Heidegger	3,363
Oberland	Patriotic Union	Renate Feger	3,355
Oberland	Patriotic Union	Daniela Ospelt	3,331
Oberland	Patriotic Union	Thomas Hagmann	3,138
Oberland	Patriotic Union	Roland Moser	2,962
Oberland	Patriotic Union	Thomas Keller	2,742
Oberland	Progressive Citizens' Party	Sebastian Gassner	2,823
Oberland	Progressive Citizens' Party	Daniel Seger	2,622
Oberland	Progressive Citizens' Party	Daniel Salzgeber	2,549
Oberland	Progressive Citizens' Party	Bettina Petzold-Mähr	2,525
Oberland	Progressive Citizens' Party	Nadine Vogelsang	2,403
Oberland	Progressive Citizens' Party	Lorenz Risch	2,373
Oberland	Progressive Citizens' Party	Sascha Quaderer	2,315
Oberland	Progressive Citizens' Party	Florin Konrad	2,286
Oberland	Progressive Citizens' Party	Judith Hoop	2,278
Oberland	Progressive Citizens' Party	Martin Rechsteiner	2,239
Oberland	Progressive Citizens' Party	Oliver Gerstgrasser	1,947
Oberland	Progressive Citizens' Party	Manfred Bischof	1,916
Oberland	Progressive Citizens' Party	Daniel Brunhart	1,891
Oberland	Progressive Citizens' Party	Bruno Beck	1,884
Oberland	Progressive Citizens' Party	Kilian Büchel	1,814
Oberland	Democrats for Liechtenstein	Thomas Rehak	3,225
Oberland	Democrats for Liechtenstein	Marion Kindle-Kühnis	2,959
Oberland	Democrats for Liechtenstein	Achim Vogt	2,794
Oberland	Democrats for Liechtenstein	Martin Seger	2,534
Oberland	Democrats for Liechtenstein	Oliver Indra	2,274
Oberland	Democrats for Liechtenstein	Isabella Fischer	2,103
Oberland	Free List	Manuela Haldner-Schierscher	1,606
Oberland	Free List	Benjamin Risch	1,509
Oberland	Free List	Tatjana As'Ad	1,490
Oberland	Free List	Samuel Schurte	1,246
Oberland	Free List	Stefan Sprenger	1,148
Oberland	Free List	Gustav Kaufmann	1,036
Unterland	Patriotic Union	Stefan Öhri	2,133
Unterland	Patriotic Union	Dietmar Hasler	2,020
Unterland	Patriotic Union	Johannes Zimmermann	1,967
Unterland	Patriotic Union	Tanja Cissé	1,950
Unterland	Patriotic Union	Mario Wohlwend	1,904
Unterland	Patriotic Union	Yannick Ritter	1,839
Unterland	Patriotic Union	Tatjana Ketz	1,819
Unterland	Patriotic Union	Elias Jehle	1,782
Unterland	Patriotic Union	Corrine Thöny-Gritsch	1,689
Unterland	Patriotic Union	Markus Schaper	1,501
Unterland	Progressive Citizens' Party	Johannes Kaiser	2,052
Unterland	Progressive Citizens' Party	Franziska Hoop	1,771
Unterland	Progressive Citizens' Party	Lino Nägele	1,738
Unterland	Progressive Citizens' Party	Helmut Hasler	1,642
Unterland	Progressive Citizens' Party	Karin Zech-Hoop	1,609
Unterland	Progressive Citizens' Party	Ivan Schurte	1,589
Unterland	Progressive Citizens' Party	Fabian Haltinner	1,534
Unterland	Progressive Citizens' Party	Andreas Haber	1,513
Unterland	Progressive Citizens' Party	Nico Büchel	1,465
Unterland	Progressive Citizens' Party	Sieglinde Kieber	1,407
Unterland	Democrats for Liechtenstein	Erich Hasler	1,700
Unterland	Democrats for Liechtenstein	Simon Schächle	1,565
Unterland	Democrats for Liechtenstein	Brigit Elkuch	1,507
Unterland	Democrats for Liechtenstein	Manuela Hasler	1,265
Unterland	Free List	Sandra Fausch	867
Unterland	Free List	Patrick Risch	848
Unterland	Free List	Valentin Ritter	730

== Aftermath ==
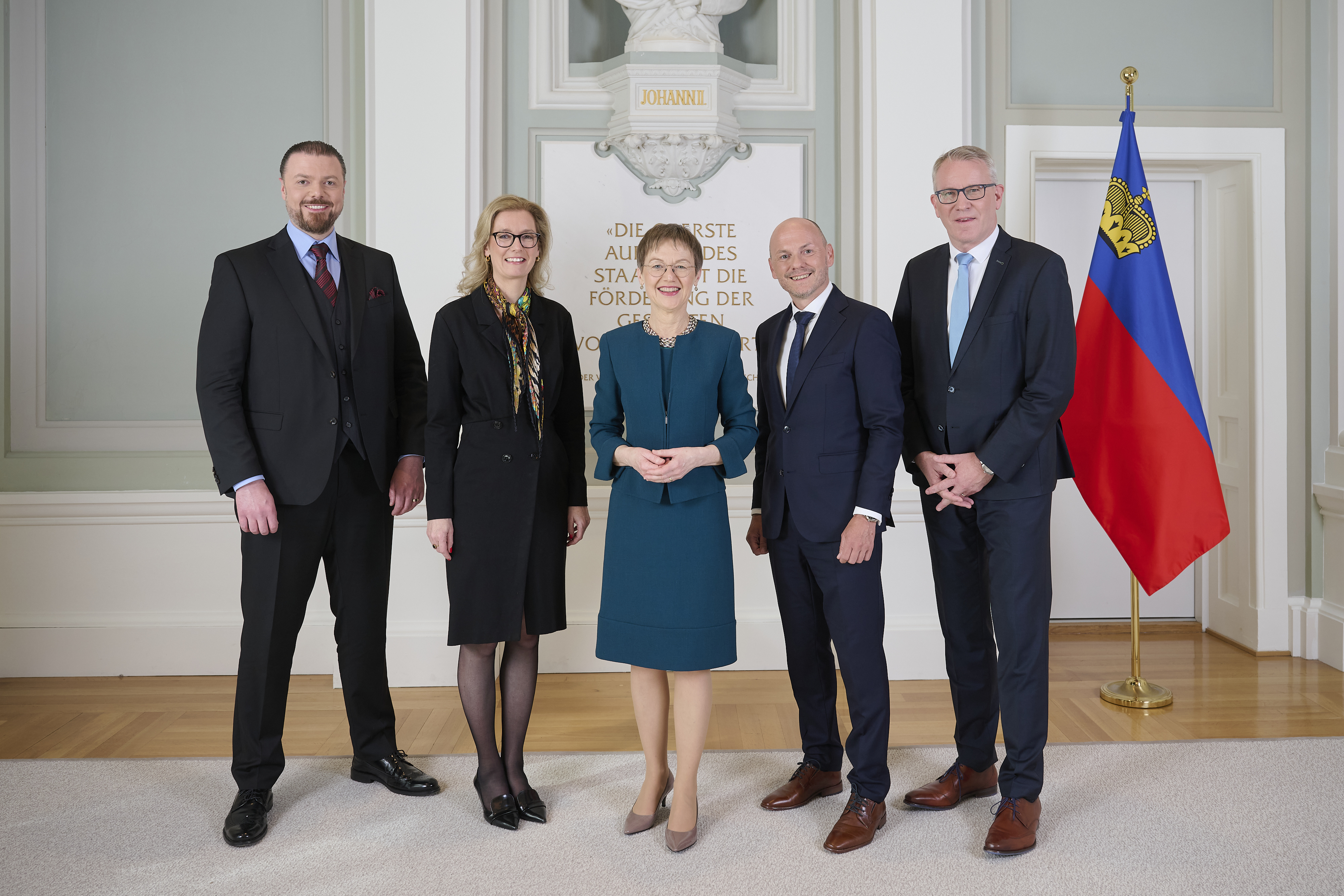
The government of Brigitte Haas

Following the election, the VU invited the FBP to begin negotiations for a renewed coalition government, which the FBP accepted. The session in the Landtag to elect the new government was initially scheduled for 20 March, but was postponed to 10 April. The DpL also expressed its desire to open negotiations for a coalition government. The VU and FBP entered into a renewed coalition government, ultimately under the leadership of Haas. The new government was sworn in on 20 April 2025. Manfred Kaufmann of the VU was elected as president of the Landtag, and Franziska Hoop of the FBP as vice president.

According to a poll by the Liechtenstein Institute published after the election, 17% and of voters who voted for the FBP in 2021 switched to the VU in 2025. 91% of respondents cited that the choice of Walch as the candidate for prime minister or the FBP's government team in general was the reason for their change in vote. In addition, the same poll suggested that the FBP lost a further 14% of its voting share from 2021 to the DpL, with the majority of respondents citing differing policies for the change.

== See also ==
- Elections in Liechtenstein
- List of Liechtenstein general elections
