= Fausch =

Fausch is a surname. Notable people with the surname include:

- Frank Fausch (1895–1968), American football coach
- Sandra Fausch (born 1989), Liechtenstein politician
