= Johannes Zimmermann =

Johannes Zimmermann may refer to:

- Johannes Zimmermann (missionary) (1825–1876), German missionary
- Johannes Zimmermann (politician) (born 1961), Liechtenstein politician
- Johannes-Friedrich Zimmermann (1882–1942), Estonian politician
