= Government Building, Vaduz =

Seat of the Government of Liechtenstein

- Regierungsgebäude
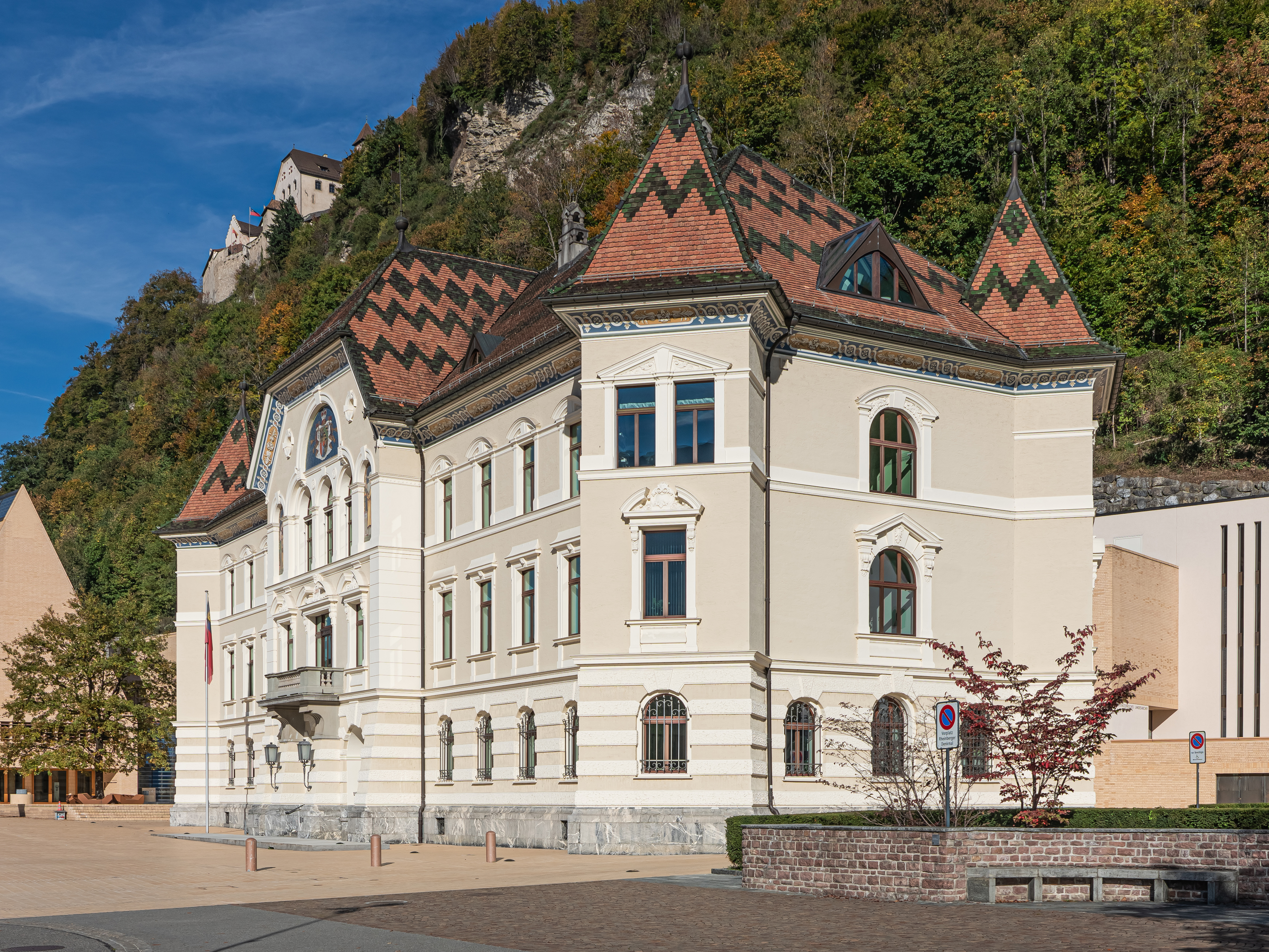
- The government building in 2022

General information
- Location: Peter-Kaiser-Platz, 2 Postfach 684 9490, Vaduz,, Vaduz, Liechtenstein
- Coordinates: 47°8′14″N 9°31′22″E
- Construction started: 1903
- Opened: 28 December 1905
- Owner: Government of Liechtenstein

Design and construction
- Architect: Gustav Ritter von Neumann

Website
- www.llv.li/en

The Government Building (German: Regierungsgebäude) is the seat of the Government of Liechtenstein. It contains the office of the prime minister and the government ministries. It is located in the capital of Vaduz.

The building began construction in 1903 to a design by Austrian architect Gustav Ritter von Neumann, who was commissioned by Johann II, and it opened on 28 December 1905. The building represents neo-Renaissance architecture and contained the first telephone network and central heating in the country.

From its opening in 1905 the building also served as the meeting place of the Landtag of Liechtenstein; this was moved to the Landtag of Liechtenstein Building, which was built next to it in 2007.

== See also ==
- Government of Liechtenstein
