= Mensch im Mittelpunkt =

Political party in Liechtenstein

People in Focus Mensch im Mittelpunkt
- Abbreviation: MiM
- Leader: Kevin Marxer
- Founded: 4 January 2022
- Headquarters: Landstrasse 92, 9495 Triesen, Liechtenstein
- Ideology: Anti-vaccine activism; Euroscepticism
- Political position: Right-wing
- Colours: Magenta
- Landtag: 0 / 25
- Mayors: 0 / 11
- Municipal Councils: 0 / 104

Website
- www.mim-partei.li

Mensch im Mittelpunkt (transl. People in Focus; abbreviated MiM) is an anti-COVID restrictions and anti-vaccine political party in Liechtenstein.

== History ==
The party formed in 2022 on an anti-COVID restrictions and anti-vaccine mandate. The party has been responsible for organising the initiative against the COVID-19 G2 rule in the 2022 Liechtenstein referendums. It is currently chaired by Kevin Marxer.

Shortly after its founding, Sebastian Gassner, member of the Landtag of Liechtenstein, occupied the URL menschimmittelpunkt.li from the party, and later sold it, donating the proceeds to the Liechtenstein state hospital.

The party opposed Liechtenstein's accession to the International Monetary Fund (IMF) in September 2024. However, the subsequent referendum was accepted by voters. In December 2024, the MiM renounced any candidates for the 2025 Liechtenstein general election.
