= Lino Nägele =

Liechtenstein architect and politician (born 1994)

Member of the Landtag of Liechtenstein for Unterland
- Incumbent
- Assumed office 9 February 2025

Personal details
- Born: 16 February 1994 (age 31) Vaduz, Liechtenstein
- Political party: Progressive Citizens' Party
- Spouse: Sarah Marxer (m. 2020)
- Children: 2

Lino Nägele (German pronunciation: [ˈliːno ˈnɛːɡələ]; born 16 February 1994) is a Liechtensteiner architect and politician who has served in the Landtag of Liechtenstein since 2025.

== Life ==
Nägele was born on 16 February 2002 in Vaduz as the son of Oliver Boltshauser and Gabriele Risch-Nägele as one of three children. He grew up in Planken, attended primary school in the municipality, and then attended high school in Vaduz. From 2010 to 2013, he conducted an apprenticeship as a carptenter in Bendern. From 2015 to 2019, he studied architecture at the University of Liechtenstein, where he graduated with a Bachelor of Science. From 2021, he trained as a building information modeling manager in St. Gallen.

He worked as a carpenter in Bendern from 2010 to 2015 and then as an architect also in Bendern from 2019 to 2021. Since 2021, he has worked at Confida Immobilien AG in Vaduz, initially as a construction manager and architecture, but since 2024 as a real estate developer.

Nägele was a board member of the Young Progressive Citizens' Party from 2015 to 2021. Since 2025, he has been a member of the Landtag of Liechtenstein as a member of the party, and also a member of the Landtag's finance committee. During this time in August 2025 he, alongside Daniel Salzgeber and Sebastian Gassner, presented an initiative to the Landtag to introduce free public transport to Liechtenstein, which was ultimately accepted the following month.

Nägele is married to Sarah Marxer, a hairdresser, since 10 June 2020, and they have 2 children together. He lives in Nendeln.
