= Simon Schächle =

Liechtenstein politician (born 1978)

Member of the Landtag of Liechtenstein for Oberland
- Incumbent
- Assumed office 9 February 2025

Personal details
- Born: 21 April 1978 (age 47) Altstätten, Switzerland
- Party: Democrats for Liechtenstein
- Spouse: Lidija Mehulic (m. 2003)
- Children: 3

Simon Schächle (born 21 April 1978) is an electrician and politician from Liechtenstein who has served in the Landtag of Liechtenstein since 2025.

== Life ==
Schächle was born on 21 April 1978 in Altstätten as the son of Otto Schächle and Theres (née Lenherr) as one of five children. He attended school in Eschen before conducting an apprenticeship at the Liechtensteinische Kraftwerke as a grid electrician. He worked as a grid electrician and driver at the Austrian Federal Railways and since 2002, he has owned a forestry company in Eschen.

Schächle was a founding member of the Democrats for Liechtenstein in 2018 and has since been its vice president. He has been a member of the Eschen municipal council since 2019. Since 2025, he has been a member of the Landtag of Liechtenstein.

He married Lidija Mehulic, a mechanical draftswoman, on 24 March 2003 and they have three children together. He lives in Eschen.
