= Martin Seger =

Liechtenstein businessman and politician (born 1976)

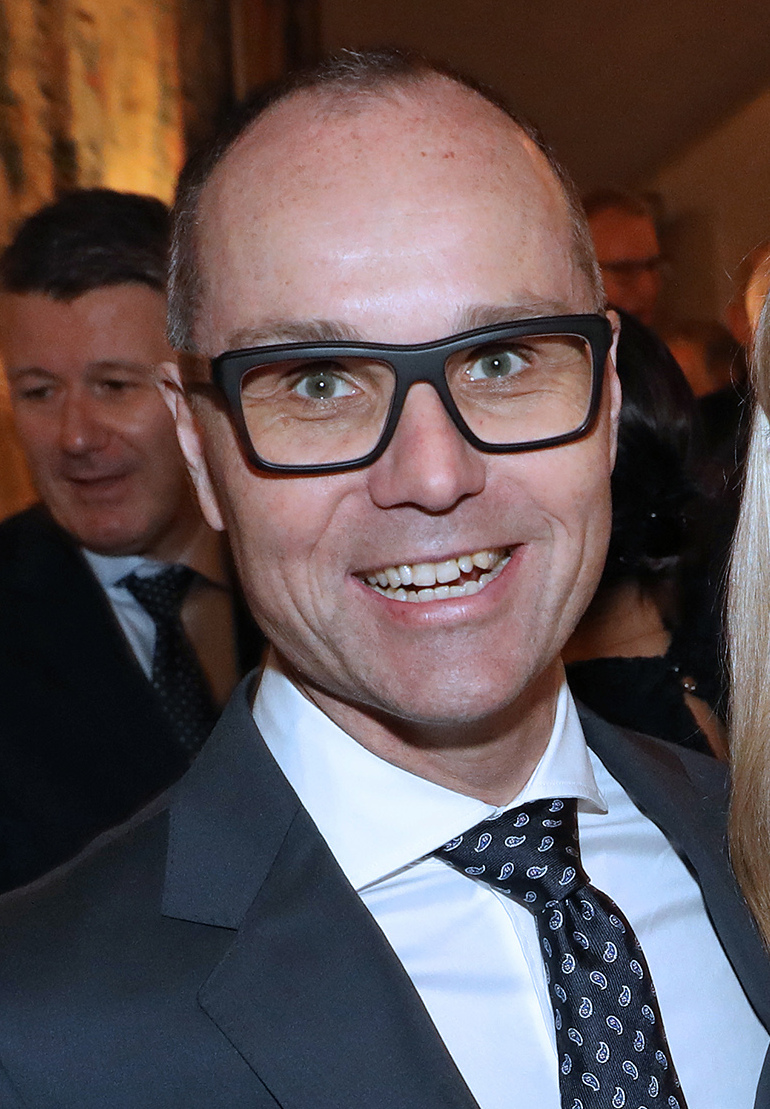
- Seger in 2025

Member of the Landtag of Liechtenstein for Oberland
- Incumbent
- Assumed office 9 February 2025

Personal details
- Born: 18 October 1976 (age 49) Grabs, Switzerland
- Party: Democrats for Liechtenstein
- Spouse(s): Patricia Schweiss (divorced) Patrizia Daiber
- Children: 4

Martin Seger (born 18 October 1976) is a businessman and politician from Liechtenstein who has served in the Landtag of Liechtenstein since 2025.

== Life ==
Seger was born on 18 October 1976 in Grabs, Switzerland as the son of Johann Seger and Monika (née Schurte) as one of three children. He completed an apprenticeship as both a heating and ventilation engineer. He was the managing director of the industrial and technology company Novintec AG from 2002 to 2011 and since 2011 has been the owner and managing director of Seger Lufttechnik AG, a ventilation and air conditioning company.

Seger represented Liechtenstein in the 1999 Games of the Small States of Europe as an air gun shooter, where he earned the silver medal.

Since 2025, Seger has been a member of the Landtag of Liechtenstein as a member of the Democrats for Liechtenstein and a member of the finance committee. In the 2025 legislative period, he was reported by the newspaper Liechtensteiner Vaterland as having presented the most inquiries to the government out of all members of the Landtag.

He married Patricia Schweiss and they had one child together, but got divorced at an unspecified time. He then went on to marry Patrizia Daiber and they have another three children together. He is from Vaduz but lives in Schaan.
