= Roger Schädler =

Liechtenstein banker and politician (born 1976)

Member of the Landtag of Liechtenstein for Oberland
- Incumbent
- Assumed office 9 February 2025

Personal details
- Born: 8 November 1976 (age 48) Chur, Switzerland
- Political party: Patriotic Union
- Spouse: Manuela Müntener (m. 2009)
- Children: 2

Roger Schädler (born 8 November 1976) is a banker and politician from Liechtenstein who has served in the Landtag of Liechtenstein since 2025.

== Life ==
Schädler was born on 8 November 1976 in Chur as the son of banker Oswald Schädler and landlady Maria (née Beck) as one of two children. He attended school in Triesen before conducting a commercial apprenticeship at LGT Group from 1993 to 1996. He as a diploma in banking and as a financial planner. He worked at LGT Group from 1998 to 2006 and then at the National Bank of Liechtenstein from 2007 to 2010. Since 2012, he has been a client advisor at LGT Group.

He was a member of the Triesenberg municipal council from 2015 to 2019 as a member of the Patriotic Union. He did not seek re-election in 2019 for professional reasons. Since 2025, he has been a member of the Landtag of Liechtenstein. Additionally, he is a member of the Landtag's foreign affairs committee and the Liechtenstein delegation to the parliamentary committees of the European Free Trade Association.

Schädler married Manuela Müntener on 4 September 2009 and they have two children together. He lives in Triesenberg.
