= Sascha Quaderer =

Liechtenstein politician (born 1974)

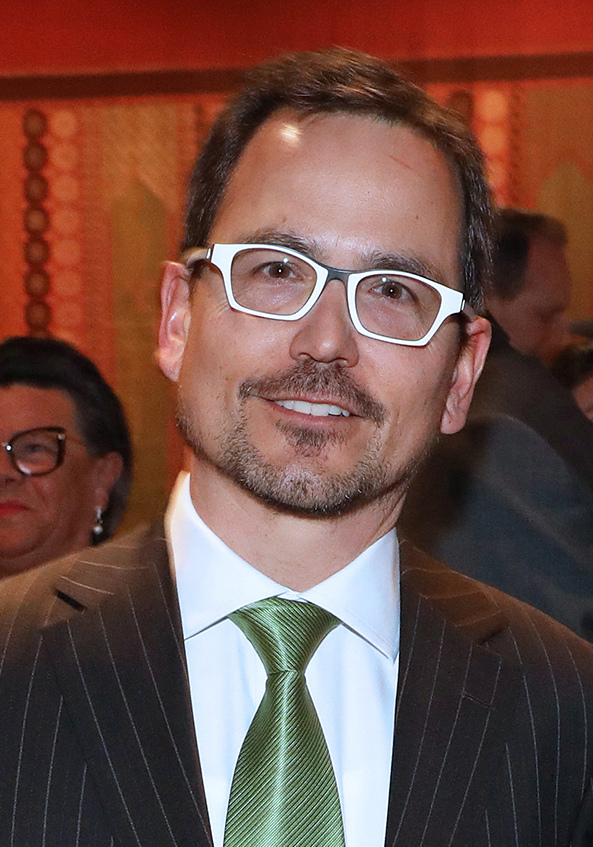
- Quaderer in 2023

Member of the Landtag of Liechtenstein for Oberland
- In office 7 February 2021 – 9 February 2025

Personal details
- Born: 22 November 1974 (age 51) St. Gallen, Switzerland
- Party: Progressive Citizens' Party
- Spouse: Maria Lang (m. 2010)
- Children: 2

Sascha Quaderer (born 22 November 1974) is a politician from Liechtenstein who served in the Landtag of Liechtenstein from 2021 to 2025.

== Life ==
Quaderer was born on 24 November 1974 in St. Gallen as the son of Hermann Quaderer and Gertrud (née Eggenberger) as one of three children. He attended primary school in Schaan, and secondary school in Vaduz. From 1994 to 1998 he studied business administration at the University of St. Gallen, and again from 2002 to 2008, where he received a doctorate.

From 1999 to 2001 Quaderer was a shareholder and managing director of Heinrich Eggenberger & Cie in Grabs. From 2008 to 2020 he was a shareholder and member of the board of directors of Eggenberger Recycling AG in Schaan and Buchs. From 2021 to 2025 Quaderer was a member of the Landtag of Liechtenstein as a member of the Progressive Citizens' Party. He unsuccessfully sought re-election in the 2025 elections.

In February 2026, Quaderer announced his candidacy for the mayor of Planken in the 2027 local elections.

Quaderer married entrepreneur Maria Lang on 5 February 2010 and they have two children together. He lives in Planken. His brother Tino Quaderer has served as the mayor of Eschen since 2019.
