= Stefan Öhri =

Liechtenstein politician (born 1976)

Member of the Landtag of Liechtenstein for Unterland
- Incumbent
- Assumed office 9 February 2025

Personal details
- Born: 9 February 1976 (age 50) Altstätten, Switzerland
- Party: Patriotic Union
- Spouse: Flor Diaz Velasquez (m. 2012)
- Children: 1

Stefan Öhri (born 9 February 1976) is a banker and politician from Liechtenstein who has served in the Landtag of Liechtenstein since 2025.

== Life ==
Öhri was born on 9 February 1976 in Altstätten as the son of toolmaker Anton Öhri and Rosa (née Marxer) as one of two children. He studied business administration in Chur before working at IBM as a management consultant from 2000 to 2004. He has worked at LGT Group since 2004, and he has been the bank's chief operating officer since 2023.

Since 2025, he has been a member of the Landtag of Liechtenstein as a member of the Patriotic Union. Additionally, he is a member of the Landtag's finance committee.

Öhri married Flor Diaz Velasquez in 2012 and they have one child together. He lives in Mauren.
