= Marion Kindle-Kühnis =

Liechtenstein politician (born 1979)

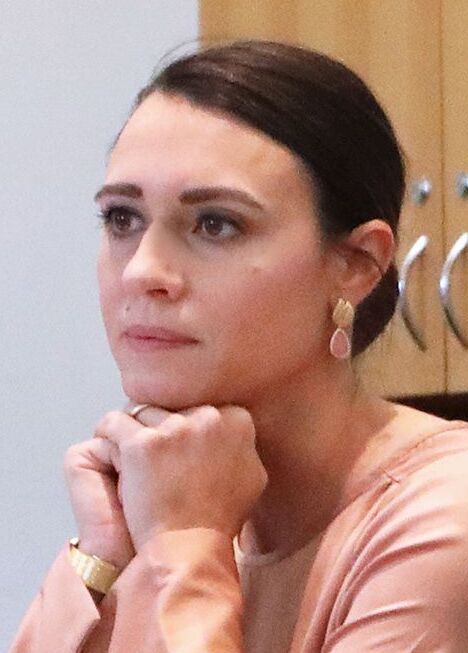
- Kindle-Kühnis in 2019

Member of the Landtag of Liechtenstein for Oberland
- Incumbent
- Assumed office 9 February 2025

Personal details
- Born: Marion Kindle; 10 February 1979 (age 47) Grabs, Switzerland
- Party: Democrats for Liechtenstein
- Other political affiliations: Patriotic Union
- Spouse: Jürgen Kühnis (m. 2009)
- Children: 2

Marion Kindle-Kühnis (née Kindle; born 10 February 1979) is a politician from Liechtenstein who has served in the Landtag of Liechtenstein since 2025.

== Life ==
Kindle was born on 10 February 1979 in Chur as the daughter of banker Florian Kindle and dance teacher Barbara (née Keller) as one of two children. She attended primary school in Triesen and then the Liechtensteinisches Gymnasium in Vaduz before studying political science, constitutional and international law at the University of Zurich, where he she graduated with a licentiate in 2006. In 2010, she received a certificate of advanced studies in politics from the University of St. Gallen.

Since 2011, she has worked at the AIBA, the international education program agency in Vaduz, where is a project manager for the European Economic Area and national qualifications framework.

Kindle-Kühnis was a deputy member of the Landtag of Liechtenstein from 2009 to 2013 as a member of the Patriotic Union. She unsuccessfully ran for re-election in 2013. Since 2025, she has been a full member of the Landtag as a member of the Democrats for Liechtenstein. During this time, she has supported a ban of mobile phones in schools.

Kindle-Kühnis married Jürgen Kühnis, a university professor, on 15 May 2009 and they have two children together. She lives in Triesen.
