= Dietmar Hasler =

Liechtenstein politician (born 1975)

Member of the Landtag of Liechtenstein for Unterland
- Incumbent
- Assumed office 9 February 2025

Personal details
- Born: 11 February 1975 (age 51) Grabs, Switzerland
- Party: Patriotic Union
- Children: 2

Dietmar Hasler (born 11 February 1975) is a politician from Liechtenstein who has served in the Landtag of Liechtenstein since 2025.

== Life ==
Hasler was born on 11 February 1975 in Grabs as the son of Paul Hasler and Kreszenz (née Eberle) as one of six children. He conducted a commercial apprenticeship in the trust sector before working in marketing at Telecom Liechtenstein AG from 2008 to 2015 and then the Vaduzer Medienhaus from 2015 to 2025. He has been the secretary general of the Patriotic Union since 2025.

He was a member of the Gamprin municipal council from 2011 to 2019 as a member of the Patriotic Union. Since 2025, he has been a member of the Landtag of Liechtenstein as a member of the party.

He lives in Gamprin and has two children.
