= Johannes Zimmermann (politician) =

Liechtenstein teacher and politician (born 1961)

Member of the Landtag of Liechtenstein for Unterland
- Incumbent
- Assumed office 9 February 2025

Personal details
- Born: 8 May 1961 (age 64); Kabul, Afghanistan
- Political party: Patriotic Union
- Spouse: Sabine Gstöhl (m. 1961)
- Children: 2

Johannes Zimmermann (born 8 May 1961) is a teacher and politician from Liechtenstein who has served in the Landtag of Liechtenstein since 2025.

== Life ==
Zimmermann was born on 8 May 1961 in Kabul as the son of Shakir Tahir, an official at the Ministry of Interior Affairs and a diplomat at the United Nations in Geneva and Ingeborg Zimmermann, an embassy employee. He attended primary school in Küblis and secondary school in Landquart before attending teachers training college in Schiers, receiving a primary school teaching diploma in 1984 and then a secondary school teaching diploma from the teachers training college in St. Gallen. He received a Master of Arts in school management in 2007 at the University of Kaiserslautern-Landau.

He worked as a secondary school teacher in Grisons, St. Gallen, Schwyz and Triesen. Since 2018, he has been the head of Eschen secondary school. Zimmermann is a member of the Liechtenstein national curling team and competed in the 2023 European Curling Championships.

Zimmermann was the chairman of the Patriotic Union in Eschen from 2017 to 2021, and then vice president of the party for the Unterland region from 2021 to 2025. Since 2025, he has been a member of the Landtag of Liechtenstein.

Zimmermann married Sabine Gstöhl on 8 August 1999 and they have two children together. He lives in Eschen.
