= Tanja Cissé =

Liechtenstein politician (born 1980)

Member of the Landtag of Liechtenstein for Unterland
- Incumbent
- Assumed office 9 February 2025

Personal details
- Born: Carmen Moll; 12 April 1980 (age 45) Grabs, Switzerland
- Political party: Patriotic Union
- Spouse(s): Siaka Tiama (m. 2003; div. 2014) Cheick Cissé (m. 2014; div. 2022)
- Children: 2

Tanja Cissé (née Moll: born 12 April 1980) is a presenter and politician from Liechtenstein who has served in the Landtag of Liechtenstein since 2025.

== Life ==
Moll was born on 12 April 1980 in Grabs as the daughter of Josef Moll and the office worker Christine (née Büchel) as one of three children. She attended primary school in Gamprin and then secondary school at the Liechtensteinisches Gymnasium and in Eschen. From 1997 to 2002, she studied at the Higher Institute for Tourism in Bludenz.

She worked at Radio Liechtenstein from 2002 to 2022, and was its head of programming from 2010 to 2019. Since 2022, she has worked as a freelance presenter and as a youth worker in Vaduz. She has been a board member of the association for humanitarian aid in Eschen since 2022.

Since 2025, Cissé has been a member of the Landtag of Liechtenstein as a member of the Patriotic Union.

She married Siaka Tiama, an entrepreneur, in 2003 but they divorced in 2014. She then married Cheick Cissé on 10 November 2010 and they had two children together, but they divorced in 2022. She is from Ruggell, but has lived in Eschen since 2024.
