= Thomas Vogt =

German material scientist (born 1958)

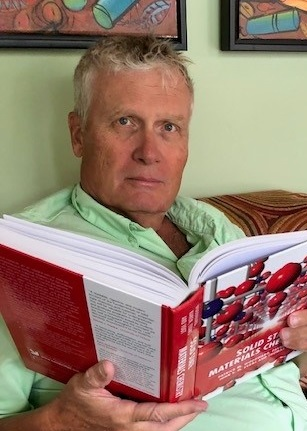
- Occupations: Chemist and materials scientist

Academic background
- Education: Diploma., Chemistry; PhD
- Alma mater: University of Tübingen
- Thesis: Large-Angle X-ray Scattering and EXAFS Investigations of Metallorganic Polymers (1987)

Academic work
- Institutions: University of South Carolina

Thomas Vogt (born 1958) is a German chemist and material scientist. He is an Educational Foundation Distinguished Professor in the Department of Chemistry and Biochemistry at the University of South Carolina.

Vogt is most known for his work in structural chemistry, chemical synthesis, and structure-property correlations of metal oxides based on diffraction techniques using electrons, x-rays, and neutrons. He has authored and co-authored over 300 peer-reviewed journal articles and several books such as Solid State Materials Chemistry and Modelling Nanoscale Imaging in Electron Microscopy. He is the recipient of the 1996 R&D 100 award from R&D Magazine, the 2002 Design and Engineering Award of Popular Mechanics, the 2018 Carolina Trustee Professorship Award, and the 2019 USC Educational Foundation Award in Science, Mathematics and Engineering.

Vogt is a Fellow of the American Physical Society, the American Association for the Advancement of Science, the Neutron Scattering Society of America, as well as of the Institute of Advanced Study at Durham University and was a Founding Member of the editorial board for Physical Review Applied.

== Education ==
Vogt earned a Diploma in Chemistry in 1985, followed by a PhD in 1987, both from the University of Tübingen.

== Career ==
After working at a European and US national laboratory (Institute Laue Langevin and Brookhaven National Laboratory), Vogt began an academic career at the Department of Philosophy at the University of South Carolina. He teaches The History and Philosophy of Chemistry in the South Carolina Honors College. Later he became a professor in the Department of Chemistry and Biochemistry at the University of South Carolina, where he has been the Educational Foundation Distinguished Professor since 2010.

From 2005 to 2023, Vogt served as Director of the NanoCenter at the University of South Carolina and was Associate Vice President for Research from 2011 to 2013, and a member on the Board of Directors of the USC Research Foundation from 2008 to 2012. He was the co-chair of the Search Committee for Provost and Chief Academic Officer in 2019 and later a Pearce Faculty Fellow in the South Carolina Honors College from 2020 to 2022.

Before joining the University of South Carolina, Vogt worked as a Scientist at the Institute Laue-Langevin, France until 1992, then joined Brookhaven National Laboratory (BNL) as an Associate Physicist, promoted to Physicist in 1995, and by 2000, he led the Powder Diffraction Group in BNL's Physics Department. From 2003 to 2005, he held various roles at BNL, including Head of Materials Synthesis and Characterization Group, Cluster Leader of Materials Synthesis in the Center for Functional Nanomaterials (CFN), and Technical Coordinator for scientific equipment in the CFN building project. Moreover, he led three startups, Nanosource, LUMINOF and Sens4 as the Chief Technology Officer. He is a limited partner of TEXXMO mobile solutions, a wearable computer company and IOT button manufacturer.

== Research ==
Vogt has conducted basic research using neutron, x-ray, and electron diffraction techniques to study structure-property relationships in materials, while also exploring philosophical and ethical implications of science and technology, particularly concerning the emergence of the periodic table of chemical elements. He holds 11 US patents such as the development of multidimensional integrated detection and analysis system (MIDAS) and neutron scintillating materials.

=== Scanning transmission electron microscopy (STEM) ===
Vogt investigated complex material structures using aberration-corrected scanning transmission electron microscopy (STEM). He helped develop new image simulation and modeling methodologies, such as super-resolution techniques, specialized de-noising methods, mathematical and statistical learning theories, and applications of compressed sensing, outlined in the book Modelling Nanoscale Imaging in Electron Microscopy. In a review for Physics Today, Les J. Allen commented, "In six chapters, the editors tackle the ambitious challenge of bridging the gap between high-level applied mathematics and experimental electron microscopy. They have met the challenge admirably... That work is also applicable to the new generation of x-ray free-electron lasers, which have similar prospective applications, and illustrates nicely the importance of applied mathematics in the physical sciences."

Vogt and collaborators using STEM imaging with spherical aberration imaged the M1 phase, a MoVNbTe oxide partial oxidation catalyst, highlighting its potential applications in complex materials structure analysis. He also used the annular dark-field STEM to analyze nanoscale domains of complex oxide phases in disordered solids development. Furthermore, he and Douglas Blom employed parallel computing to analyze compositional disorder in a Mo, V-oxide bronze, highlighting discrepancies between experimental and simulated V content along metal-oxygen atomic columns, validated by HAADF-STEM imaging.

=== Crystallography ===
Vogt used high-resolution neutron diffraction techniques to investigate structural changes in molecules. Alongside Andrew N. Fitch and Jeremy K. Cockcroft, he revealed the low-temperature crystal structure of Rhenium heptafluoride (ReF7), confirming its molecular configuration as a distorted pentagonal bipyramid with Cs (m) symmetry. In another joint study published in Science, he observed negative thermal expansion in ZrW_{2}O_{8}, using diffraction to analyze its cubic structure.

Using high-resolution neutron powder diffraction, Czjzek and Vogt located the hydrogen positions in zeolite Y. Subsequently, with Yongjae Lee, he examined structural changes in zeolites at high pressures, showing a pronounced rearrangement of non-framework metal ions and pressure-induced hydration/superhydration.

=== Solid-state chemistry ===
Vogt's work on solid-state chemistry has focused on the temperature and pressure-dependent structural arrangements of materials. In 2021, he co-authored a textbook Solid State Materials Chemistry with Patrick M. Woodward, Pavel Karen and John S.O. Evans, covering structure, defects, bonding, and properties of solid state materials. He reported a spin ordering transition in oxygen-deficient YBaCo_{2}O_{5}, accompanied by structural changes and spin state alterations, marking the first observation of this phenomenon induced by long-range orbital and charge ordering. He collaborated on the characterization of a new solid electrolyte, Bi_{2}La_{8}[(GeO_{4})_{6}]O_{3}, identifying oxide ion interstitials as key to its ionic conductivity using advanced dark field electron microscopy. Furthermore, he investigated the cubic structure of CaCu_{3}Ti_{4}O_{12}, a material with a large optical conductivity, ruling out ferroelectricity in favor of relaxor-like dynamics responsible for its giant dielectric effect.

In a paper published in Nature Chemistry, Vogt and collaborators demonstrated the irreversible insertion and trapping of xenon in Ag-natrolite under moderate conditions, a possible explanation xenon deficiency in terrestrial and Martian atmospheres. He also observed water insertion into kaolinite at 2.7 GPa and 200 °C, shedding light on water release in subduction zones and its effects on seismicity and volcanic activity. Furthermore, his research showcased a pressure-driven metathesis reaction resulting in the formation of a water-free pollucite phase, CsAlSi_{2}O_{6}, with potential applications in nuclear waste remediation.

Vogt and colleagues used advanced laser techniques to observe sub nanosecond structural dynamics of iron, revealing intricate wave patterns during compression and shock decay. He also examined the structural phase transitions in silicon 2D-nanosheets under high pressure, revealing size and shape-dependent behavior and the formation of 1D nanowires with reduced thermal conductivity.

=== Phosphor materials for lighting ===
Vogt contributed to the development of white phosphors for fluorescent lighting. Together with Sangmoon Park, he developed a family of self-activating and doped UV phosphors for fluorescent white-light production. They also developed up-conversion phosphors emitting shorter-wavelength light in an ordered oxyfluoride compound.

== Awards and honors ==
- 1996 – R&D 100 Award, R&D Magazine
- 2002 – Design and Engineering Award, Popular Mechanics
- 2018 – Carolina Trustee Professorship Award, USC
- 2019 – Educational Foundation Award in Science, Mathematics and Engineering, USC

== Bibliography ==
=== Books ===
- Modelling Nanoscale Imaging in Electron Microscopy (2012) ISBN 978-1461421900
- Solid State Materials Chemistry (2021) ISBN 978-0521873253
- Complex Oxides: An Introduction (2019) ISBN 978-9813278578

=== Selected articles ===
- Evans, J. S. O., Mary, T. A., Vogt, T., Subramanian, M. A., & Sleight, A. W. (1996). Negative thermal expansion in ZrW2O8 and HfW2O8. Chemistry of materials, 8(12), 2809–2823.
- Mary, T. A., Evans, J. S. O., Vogt, T., & Sleight, A. W. (1996). Negative thermal expansion from 0.3 to 1050 Kelvin in ZrW2O8. Science, 272(5258), 90–92.
- Ramirez, A. P., Subramanian, M. A., Gardel, M., Blumberg, G., Li, D., Vogt, T., & Shapiro, S. M. (2000). Giant dielectric constant response in a copper-titanate. Solid state communications, 115(5), 217–220.
- Homes, C. C., Vogt, T., Shapiro, S. M., Wakimoto, S., & Ramirez, A. P. (2001). Optical response of high-dielectric-constant perovskite-related oxide. science, 293(5530), 673–676.
- Petkov, V., Trikalitis, P. N., Bozin, E. S., Billinge, S. J., Vogt, T., & Kanatzidis, M. G. (2002). Structure of V2O5⊙ n H2O Xerogel Solved by the Atomic Pair Distribution Function Technique. Journal of the American Chemical Society, 124(34), 10157–10162.
- Murphy, G. L., Zhang, Z., Maynard-Casely, H. E., Stackhouse, J., Kowalski, P. M., Vogt, T., ... & Kennedy, B. J. (2023). Pressure induced reduction in SrUO4–A topotactic pathway to accessing extreme incompressibility. Acta Materialia, 243, 118508.
