= Landtag of Liechtenstein =

Legislature of Liechtenstein

Landtag of the Principality of Liechtenstein Landtag des Fürstentums Liechtenstein
- 2025–2029 Legislature

Type
- Type: Unicameral

Leadership
- President and Majority Leader: Manfred Kaufmann, VU since 10 April 2025
- Vice President: Franziska Hoop, FBP since 10 April 2025
- Minority Leader: Thomas Rehak, FBP since 10 April 2025

Structure
- Seats: 25 councillors
- Political groups: Government (17): VU (10); FBP (7); Opposition (8): DpL (6); FL (2)
- Length of term: 4 years
- Authority: Chapter V, Constitution of Liechtenstein

Elections
- Voting system: Open list proportional representation elected in two constituencies, each with a separate 8% election threshold
- First election: 24 November 1862
- Last election: 9 February 2025
- Next election: By 2029

Meeting place
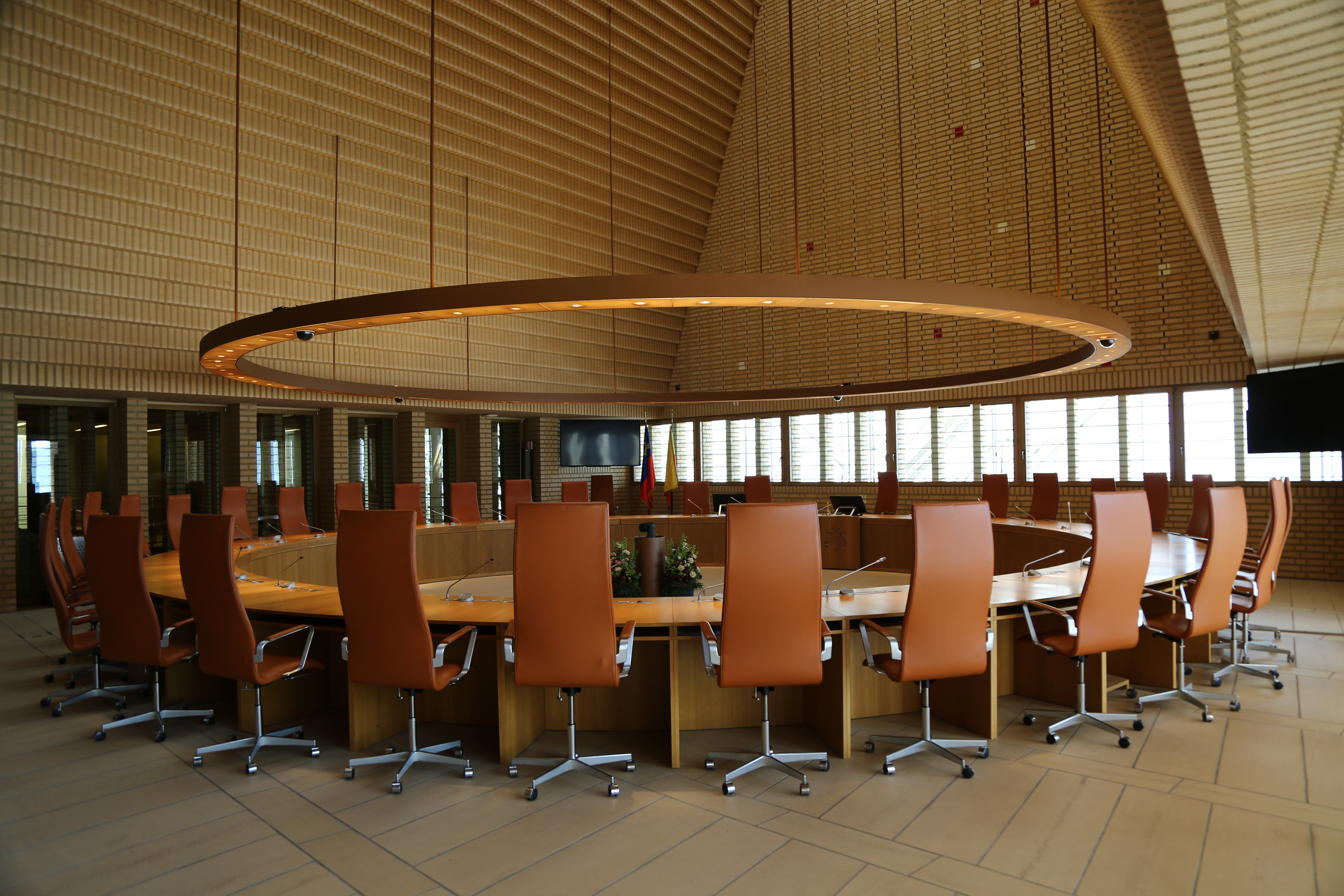
- Peter-Kaiser-Platz 3 LI-9490 Vaduz

Website
- www.landtag.li

Constitution
- Constitution of Liechtenstein

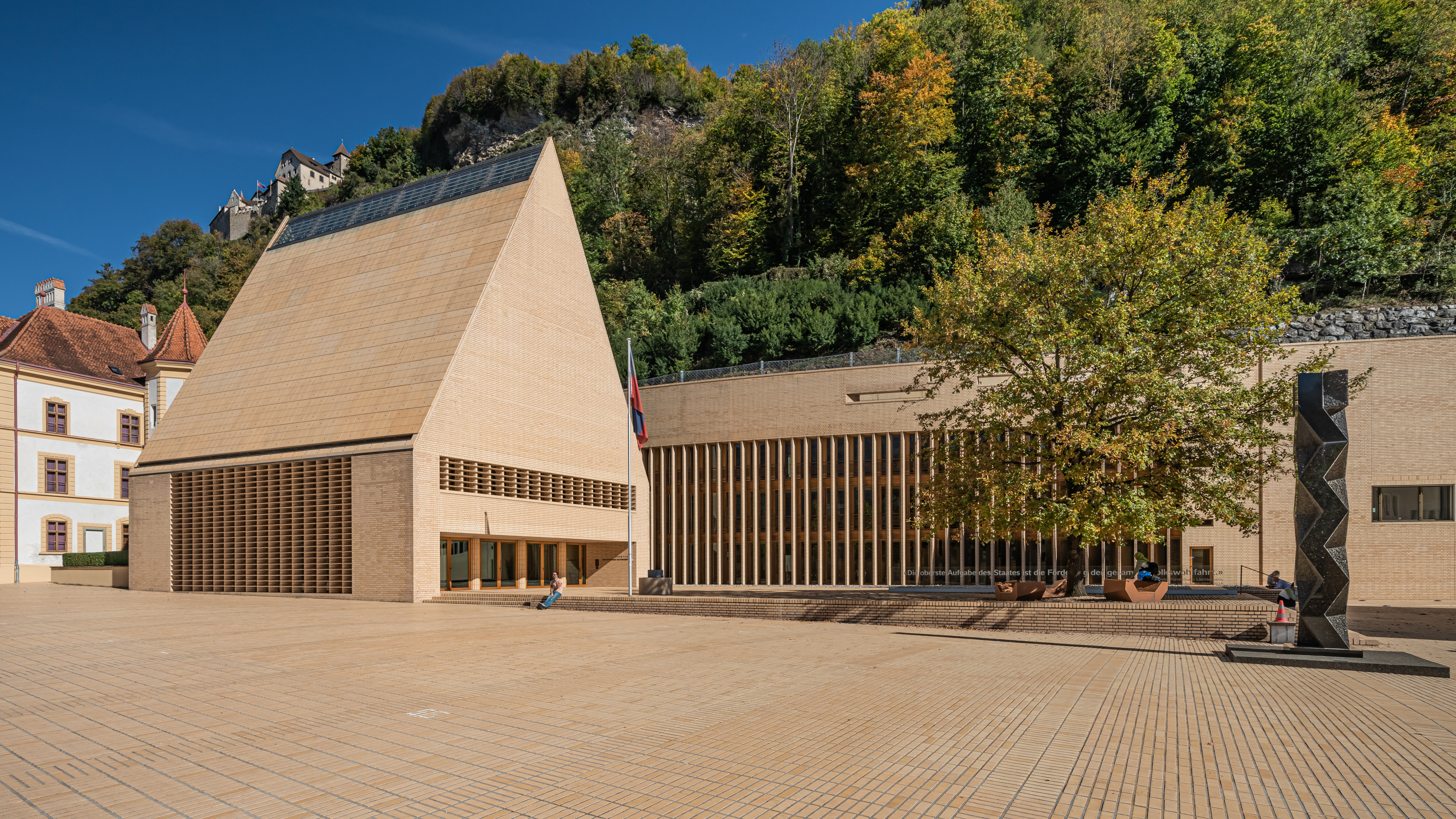
Landtag building of Liechtenstein

The Landtag of the Principality of Liechtenstein (German: Landtag des Fürstentums Liechtenstein) is the unicameral parliament of Liechtenstein.

== Qualifications ==
Citizens who have attained the age of 18, have permanent residency in the country and have lived in the country for at least one month before the election can vote, and all eligible voters can run for office. A group of at least 30 voters per constituency has the right to nominate a list of candidates. However, voters can only support a nomination for a single list.

Women in Liechtenstein were granted the right to vote in 1984, and thus could not stand for election to the Landtag before then.

== Election ==
Under the Constitution of 1921, the size of the Landtag was set at 15 members. A constitutional amendment approved in a 1988 referendum increased the number to 25, starting with the 1989 elections. Each of the 25 members is elected for a four-year term by open list proportional representation from two constituencies, Oberland with 15 seats and Unterland with 10 seats. The electoral threshold is 8% (which equals 2 seats). Unterland consists of the municipalities of Eschen, Gamprin, Mauren, Ruggell and Schellenberg; Oberland consists of Balzers, Planken, Schaan, Triesen, Triesenberg and Vaduz. The type of open list procedure used is panachage, which allows voters to vote for as many candidates as there are seats to be filled, as well as to delete names from a list and to add names from another list.

Elected along with the lists are substitute members (Stellvertretern). These substitute members take the place of a regular member who cannot attend a meeting of the Landtag, or in the case that the regular member resigns. A party receives one substitute member for every three seats they win in each of the two electoral districts, though every political party is entitled to at least one substitute. Parliamentary groups may be formed in the Landtag for political parties or alliances with at least three elected members, who then appoint a spokesperson. Groups are entitled to be represented in committees and have their own conference room.

The Landtag has four international delegations – the EFTA Parliamentary Committee, the OSCE Parliamentary Assembly, the Inter-Parliamentary Union and the Lake Constance Parliamentary Commission. These delegates are elected at the first meeting of a legislative term, and substitute members can also be elected.

== Officers and powers ==
The Landtag elects from amongst its members the president and vice president at the opening session each year. The president serves as the speaker of the body, calls meetings and represents the Landtag externally. The president, vice president and parliamentary group speakers form the Bureau of the Parliament (Landtagspräsidium). The Bureau prepares the budget of the Landtag and hires the staff of the body; it also helps the president prepare the body's agenda for each session of the Landtag.

All members of the Landtag have limited legal immunity while performing their duties. Members cannot be prosecuted for anything they say during sessions, and may only be arrested with permission from the Landtag or if they are caught in the act of committing a crime.

== Committees ==
The Landtag has three standing committees consisting of five members each:

- Foreign Affairs Commission
- Finance Commission
- Audit Commission

The Landtag may also appoint special committees consisting of three to five members. The body can also form investigative committees for any purpose upon the call of at least seven members.

When the Landtag is out of session, its functions are exercised by the National Committee (Landesausschuss), which acts as a presidium. The National Committee consists of the president, and four other members, two from each of the country's two constituencies.

== Last election ==
Results by municipality

The VU received 38.3% of the vote, a 2.7% increase from their 2021 performance, and maintained its ten seats in the Landtag. The FBP received 27.5% of the vote, an 8.4% decrease from 2021, and won seven seats, a decrease of three. It is the lowest result in the FBP's history. The DpL saw its vote share rise 11.1% to 23.3% from 2021 and won six seats, an increase of four, the highest of any third party in Liechtenstein's history. The Free List received 10.9% of the vote, a decrease of 2% from 2021, and won two seats, a decrease of one.

A total of 16,171 ballots were cast, resulting in a 76.3% voter turnout. The majority of votes (97%) were cast by post.

Party	Votes	%	Seats	+/–
Patriotic Union	79,478	38.32	10	0
Progressive Citizens' Party	56,983	27.48	7	–3
Democrats for Liechtenstein	48,370	23.32	6	+4
Free List	22,549	10.87	2	–1
Total	207,380	100.00	25	0
Valid votes	15,748	97.38		
Invalid/blank votes	423	2.62		
Total votes	16,171	100.00		
Registered voters/turnout	21,183	76.34		
Source: Landtagswahlen 2025

=== By electoral district ===
The elected 25 members of the Landtag consisted of 17 men and 8 women, the latter being the highest amount in Liechtenstein's history. The oldest member elected was Erich Hasler of the DpL at 68 years old, and the youngest was Lino Nägele of the FBP at 30.

Results by electoral district
Electoral district	Seats	Electorate	Party	Elected members	Subsititutes	Votes	%	Swing	Seats won	+/–
Oberland	15	13,137	Patriotic Union	Manfred Kaufmann; Christoph Wenaweser; Thomas Vogt; Dagmar Bühler-Nigsch; Roger Schädler; Carmen Heeb-Kindle	Markus Gstöhl; Marc Risch	58,725	39.2	▲2.3	6	0
Oberland	15	13,137	Progressive Citizens' Party	Sebastian Gassner; Daniel Seger; Daniel Salzgeber; Bettina Petzold-Mähr	Nadine Vogelsang	38,352	25.6	▼9.1	4	▼2
Oberland	15	13,137	Democrats for Liechtenstein	Thomas Rehak; Marion Kindle-Kühnis; Achim Vogt; Martin Seger	Oliver Indra	35,695	23.8	▲14.2	4	▲3
Oberland	15	13,137	Free List	Manuela Haldner-Schierscher	Benjamin Risch	16,928	11.3	▼2.4	1	▼1
Unterland	10	7,247	Patriotic Union	Stefan Öhri; Dietmar Hasler; Johannes Zimmermann; Tanja Cissé	Mario Wohlwend	20,753	36.0	▲2.3	4	0
Unterland	10	7,247	Progressive Citizens' Party	Johannes Kaiser; Franziska Hoop; Lino Nägele	Helmut Hasler	18,631	32.3	▼6.6	3	▼1
Unterland	10	7,247	Democrats for Liechtenstein	Erich Hasler; Simon Schächle	Brigit Elkuch	12,675	22.0	▲6.9	2	▲1
Unterland	10	7,247	Free List	Sandra Fausch	Patrick Risch	5,621	9.7	▼1.0	1	0
Source: Landtagswahlen 2025

=== Votes by candidate ===
Constituency	Party	Candidate	Votes
Oberland	Patriotic Union	Manfred Kaufmann	4,444
Oberland	Patriotic Union	Christoph Wenaweser	3,839
Oberland	Patriotic Union	Dagmar Bühler-Nigsch	3,758
Oberland	Patriotic Union	Thomas Vogt	3,751
Oberland	Patriotic Union	Roger Schädler	3,639
Oberland	Patriotic Union	Carmen Heeb-Kindle	3,596
Oberland	Patriotic Union	Markus Gstöhl	3,533
Oberland	Patriotic Union	Marc Risch	3,407
Oberland	Patriotic Union	Andreas Good	3,363
Oberland	Patriotic Union	Norma Heidegger	3,363
Oberland	Patriotic Union	Renate Feger	3,355
Oberland	Patriotic Union	Daniela Ospelt	3,331
Oberland	Patriotic Union	Thomas Hagmann	3,138
Oberland	Patriotic Union	Roland Moser	2,962
Oberland	Patriotic Union	Thomas Keller	2,742
Oberland	Progressive Citizens' Party	Sebastian Gassner	2,823
Oberland	Progressive Citizens' Party	Daniel Seger	2,622
Oberland	Progressive Citizens' Party	Daniel Salzgeber	2,549
Oberland	Progressive Citizens' Party	Bettina Petzold-Mähr	2,525
Oberland	Progressive Citizens' Party	Nadine Vogelsang	2,403
Oberland	Progressive Citizens' Party	Lorenz Risch	2,373
Oberland	Progressive Citizens' Party	Sascha Quaderer	2,315
Oberland	Progressive Citizens' Party	Florin Konrad	2,286
Oberland	Progressive Citizens' Party	Judith Hoop	2,278
Oberland	Progressive Citizens' Party	Martin Rechsteiner	2,239
Oberland	Progressive Citizens' Party	Oliver Gerstgrasser	1,947
Oberland	Progressive Citizens' Party	Manfred Bischof	1,916
Oberland	Progressive Citizens' Party	Daniel Brunhart	1,891
Oberland	Progressive Citizens' Party	Bruno Beck	1,884
Oberland	Progressive Citizens' Party	Kilian Büchel	1,814
Oberland	Democrats for Liechtenstein	Thomas Rehak	3,225
Oberland	Democrats for Liechtenstein	Marion Kindle-Kühnis	2,959
Oberland	Democrats for Liechtenstein	Achim Vogt	2,794
Oberland	Democrats for Liechtenstein	Martin Seger	2,534
Oberland	Democrats for Liechtenstein	Oliver Indra	2,274
Oberland	Democrats for Liechtenstein	Isabella Fischer	2,103
Oberland	Free List	Manuela Haldner-Schierscher	1,606
Oberland	Free List	Benjamin Risch	1,509
Oberland	Free List	Tatjana As'Ad	1,490
Oberland	Free List	Samuel Schurte	1,246
Oberland	Free List	Stefan Sprenger	1,148
Oberland	Free List	Gustav Kaufmann	1,036
Unterland	Patriotic Union	Stefan Öhri	2,133
Unterland	Patriotic Union	Dietmar Hasler	2,020
Unterland	Patriotic Union	Johannes Zimmermann	1,967
Unterland	Patriotic Union	Tanja Cissé	1,950
Unterland	Patriotic Union	Mario Wohlwend	1,904
Unterland	Patriotic Union	Yannick Ritter	1,839
Unterland	Patriotic Union	Tatjana Ketz	1,819
Unterland	Patriotic Union	Elias Jehle	1,782
Unterland	Patriotic Union	Corrine Thöny-Gritsch	1,689
Unterland	Patriotic Union	Markus Schaper	1,501
Unterland	Progressive Citizens' Party	Johannes Kaiser	2,052
Unterland	Progressive Citizens' Party	Franziska Hoop	1,771
Unterland	Progressive Citizens' Party	Lino Nägele	1,738
Unterland	Progressive Citizens' Party	Helmut Hasler	1,642
Unterland	Progressive Citizens' Party	Karin Zech-Hoop	1,609
Unterland	Progressive Citizens' Party	Ivan Schurte	1,589
Unterland	Progressive Citizens' Party	Fabian Haltinner	1,534
Unterland	Progressive Citizens' Party	Andreas Haber	1,513
Unterland	Progressive Citizens' Party	Nico Büchel	1,465
Unterland	Progressive Citizens' Party	Sieglinde Kieber	1,407
Unterland	Democrats for Liechtenstein	Erich Hasler	1,700
Unterland	Democrats for Liechtenstein	Simon Schächle	1,565
Unterland	Democrats for Liechtenstein	Brigit Elkuch	1,507
Unterland	Democrats for Liechtenstein	Manuela Hasler	1,265
Unterland	Free List	Sandra Fausch	867
Unterland	Free List	Patrick Risch	848
Unterland	Free List	Valentin Ritter	730

== See also ==
- List of presidents of the Landtag of Liechtenstein
