= Sebastian Gassner =

Liechtenstein politician (born 1987)

Member of the Landtag of Liechtenstein for Oberland
- Incumbent
- Assumed office 7 February 2021

Personal details
- Born: Sebastian Schädler; 27 December 1987 (age 38) Vaduz, Liechtenstein
- Party: Progressive Citizens' Party
- Spouse: Marina Gassner (m. 2021)
- Children: 1

Sebastian Gassner (née Schädler; born 27 December 1987) is an engineer and politician from Liechtenstein who has served in the Landtag of Liechtenstein since 2021.

== Life ==
Schädler was born 27 December 1987, one of the three children of construction manager Armin Schädler and Brigitte Amann. He attended primary school in Triesenberg and then secondary school in Triesen. From 2003 to 2008 he attended federal technical college in Rankweil. From 2009 to 2015 he studied electrical engineering and information technology at the Technical University of Munich, where he received a master of science.

From 2009 to 2012 he worked as a manufacturing engineer at Tridonic GmbH & Co KG in Austria and the United Kingdom, and then at ThyssenKrupp Presta AG in Eschen from 2015 to 2019. From 2021 to 2024, he worked as a technology development engineer at Ivoclar in Schaan.

Since 2021, Gassner has been a member of the Landtag of Liechtenstein as a member of the Progressive Citizens' Party. He was a member of the Liechtenstein delegation of the Organization for Security and Co-operation in Europe from 2021 to 2025, and since 2025 the head of the Liechtenstein delegation to the parliamentary committees of the EFTA and EEA. In November 2021, he was the only member of the Landtag to speak out against the establishment of a low-threshold drug-addiction counselling centre in Liechtenstein and early drug-addiction prevention in schools. Shortly after the founding of the Mensch im Mittelpunkt in January 2022, Gassner occupied the URL menschimmittelpunkt.li from the party, and then he later sold it, donating the proceeds to the Liechtenstein state hospital.

In August 2025, Gassner, alongside Daniel Salzgeber and Lino Nägele presented an initiative to the Landtag to introduce free public transport to Liechtenstein, which was ultimately accepted the following month.

He married Marina Gassner on 3 December 2021 and they have one child together.
