= Carmen Heeb-Kindle =

Liechtenstein teacher and politician (born 1985)

Member of the Landtag of Liechtenstein for Oberland
- Incumbent
- Assumed office 9 February 2025

Personal details
- Born: Carmen Kindle; 23 April 1985 (age 40) Vaduz, Liechtenstein
- Party: Democrats for Liechtenstein
- Other political affiliations: Patriotic Union (before 2025)
- Spouse: Andreas Heeb (m. 2018)
- Relations: Lorenz Heeb (father-in-law)
- Children: 2

Carmen Heeb-Kindle (née Kindle; born 23 April 1985) is a teacher and politician from Liechtenstein who has served in the Landtag of Liechtenstein since 2025.

== Life ==
Kindle was born on 23 April 1985 as the daughter of Franz Kindle and Brigitte Green-Schurte (née Schurte) as one of four children. She attended primary school in Balzers and then the Liechtensteinisches Gymnasium in Vaduz before attending the St. Joseph Institute in Feldkirch from 2001 to 2004. From 2006 to 2009 she conducted a business administration apprenticeship at Centrum Bank in Vaduz. From 2011 she studied at the University of Applied Sciences of the Grisons, where she graduated with a Bachelor of Arts in 2014.

She worked at Centrum bank from 2009 to 2010 and then in child care in Vilters-Wangs and Grisons from 2010 to 2014. She was a teacher at the primary school in Berschis from 2014 to 2025. She has been the president of the Scouts and Guides of Liechtenstein since 2023.

Since 2025, Heeb-Kindle has been a member of the Landtag of Liechtenstein as a member of the Patriotic Union. Additionally, she is the head of the Landtag's delegation to the Parliamentary Assembly of the OSCE.

Heeb-Kindle married Andreas Heeb on 19 October 2018, a teacher and son of former Landtag member Lorenz Heeb, and they have two children together. She lives in Balzers.
