= Sandra Fausch =

Liechtenstein politician (born 1989)

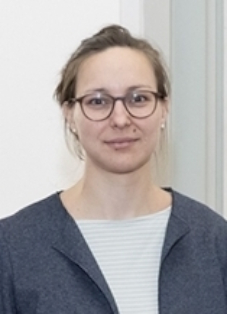
- Fausch in 2024

Member of the Landtag of Liechtenstein for Unterland
- Incumbent
- Assumed office 9 February 2025

Personal details
- Born: 8 September 1989 (age 36) Vaduz, Liechtenstein
- Party: Free List

Sandra Fausch (born 8 September 1989) is a politician from Liechtenstein who has served in the Landtag of Liechtenstein since 2025.

== Life ==
Fausch was born 8 September 1989 in Vaduz as the daughter of Urs Fausch and Margot (née Geiger) as one of two children. She attended primary school in Mauren and then secondary school in Eschen. She conducted an apprenticeship as a bank clerk at LGT Group from 2005 to 2008 before she obtained a trader certificate from the Global Financial Markets Association in 2011. She worked as a foreign exchange trader at LGT Group from 2008 to 2013.

From 2014 Fausch studied environmental engineering at the Zurich University of Applied Sciences, where she graduated with a Bachelor of Science in 2018. Since 2019, she has been a co-managing director of Ackerschaft in Vaduz, a non-profit agricultural sustainability organization.

Fausch was a deputy member of the Landtag of Liechtenstein from 2021 to 2025 as a member of the Free List. Since 2025 has been a full member of the Landtag.

She is from Mauren but lives in Eschen.
