= Christoph Wenaweser =

Liechtenstein politician (born 1963)

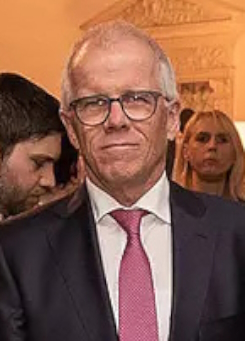
- Wenaweser in 2019

Member of the Landtag of Liechtenstein for Oberland
- Incumbent
- Assumed office 9 February 2025
- In office 3 February 2013 – 7 February 2021

Personal details
- Born: 13 June 1963 (age 62) Grabs, Switzerland
- Party: Patriotic Union
- Spouse: Susanne Heeb (m. 1987)
- Children: 2

Christoph Wenaweser (born 13 June 1963) is a politician from Liechtenstein who has served in the Landtag of Liechtenstein since 2025, having previously served from 2013 to 2021.

== Life ==
Wenaweser was born on 13 June 1963 in Grabs as the son of Josef Wenaweser and Maria Lenz. He attended primary school in Schaan, and then secondary school in Vaduz. He conducted a commercial apprenticeship at the National Bank of Liechtenstein from 1979 to 1982 before receiving a diploma in human resources management in 1990. He was an editor at the Liechtensteiner Vaterland from 1985 to 1988.

From 1989 to 1991 he was a personal assistant in the Liechtenstein government and then the head of human resources at Ivoclar in Schaan from 1991 to 1998. He was the head of the traffic department of the Liechtenstein National Police in 1999. From 2000 to 2005 he was the administrative director of the law firm Marxer & Partner Rechtsanwälte in Vaduz, and then its managing director from 2005 to 2010. Since 2011, he has been a board member Continor Treuhand Anstalt in Vaduz. He was a board member of the Liechtenstein Olympic Committee from 2020 to 2024.

Wenaweser was a member of the Schaan municipal council from 2011 to 2015 as a member of the Patriotic Union. He was a member of the Landtag of Liechtenstein from 2013 to 2021 and he was the Patriotic Union's spokesman in the Landtag from 2013 to 2017. From 2017 to 2021 and again since 2025 he has been a member of the Liechtenstein delegation to the Parliamentary Assembly of the Council of Europe.

Wenaweser married Susanne Heeb on 2 May 1987 and they have two children together. He lives in Schaan.
