= Daniel Salzgeber =

Liechtenstein footballer and politician (born 1992)

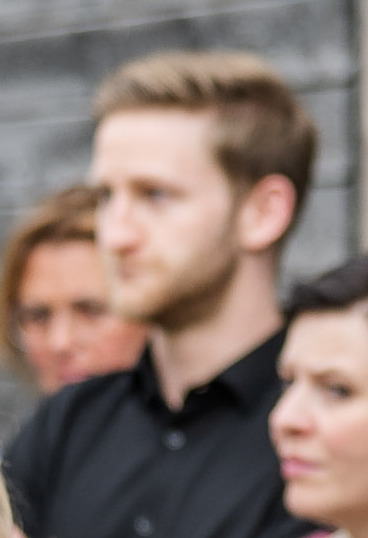
- Salzgeber in 2025

Member of the Landtag of Liechtenstein for Oberland
- Incumbent
- Assumed office 9 February 2025

Personal details
- Born: 5 August 1992 (age 33) Vaduz, Liechtenstein
- Party: Progressive Citizens' Party
- Spouse: Anna-Lena Banzer (m. 2024)

Daniel Salzgeber (born 5 August 1992) is a footballer and politician from Liechtenstein who has served in the Landtag of Liechtenstein since 2025.

== Life ==
Salzgeber was born on 5 August 1992 in Vaduz as the son of Kurt Salzgeber and Caroline (née Risch). He attended primary school in Triesen and then studied business administration and marketing at the University of St. Gallen, where he graduated in 2011. In 2024, he obtained a certificate of advanced studies in European law at the University of Bern. From 2016 to 2023, he worked as a brand manager at Nestlé, Froneri and Findus. Since 2023, he has been a Schengen Area coordinator for the Liechtenstein National Administration.

Since 2025, Salzgeber has been a member of the Landtag of Liechtenstein as a member of the Progressive Citizens' Party, and a member of the Liechtenstein delegation to the Inter-Parliamentary Union.

He has been the captain of the FC Triesen first team since 2024.

Salzgeber married Anna-Lena Banzer, a nurse, on 28 August 2024. He lives in Triesen.
