= Dagmar Bühler-Nigsch =

Liechtenstein politician (born 1969)

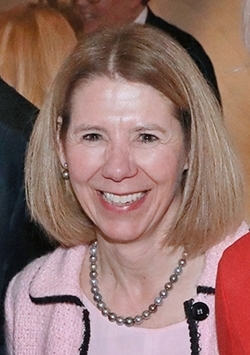
- Bühler-Nigsch in 2024

Member of the Landtag of Liechtenstein for Oberland
- Incumbent
- Assumed office 7 February 2021

Personal details
- Born: 3 September 1969 (age 56) Grabs, Switzerland
- Party: Patriotic Union
- Spouse: Hans Walter Bühler (m. 1996)
- Children: 2

Dagmar Bühler-Nigsch (née Nigsch; born 3 September 1969) is a politician from Liechtenstein who has served in the Landtag of Liechtenstein since 2021.

== Life ==
Bühler-Nigsch was born on 3 September 1969 in Grabs, Switzerland as the daughter of Ernst (née Nigsch) and Gerlinde Quaderer as one of four children. She attended primary school in Schaan and then secondary school in Vaduz. From 1985 to 1988 she conducted a commercial apprenticeship at Hilti in Schaan, and then worked in the company as an export clerk in Ireland and Spain.

From 1991 to 1995 Bühler-Nigsch was an assistant to the head of sales at Ivoclar. From 2001 to 2012 she worked at ITEC AG in Triesen as a management consultant. Since 2013, she has been the managing director at the Association of Liechtenstein Charitable Foundations and Trusts in Schaan.

Since 2021, she has been a member Landtag of Liechtenstein and also a member of the Inter-Parliamentary Union. She has been the vice president of the Patriotic Union (VU) since 2023. During this time, she has been an advocate for greater diversity within the Landtag and was part of a cross-party initiative to introduce uniform bus fares to the country in 2023. Since 2025, she has been the VU's spokesperson in the Landtag.

Bühler-Nigsch married Hans Walter Bühler on 2 October 1996 and they have two children together.
