= Manuela Haldner-Schierscher =

Liechtenstein politician (born 1971)

Member of the Landtag of Liechtenstein for Oberland
- Incumbent
- Assumed office 7 February 2021

Personal details
- Born: Manuela Schierscher; 26 June 1971 (age 54) Grabs, Switzerland
- Party: Free List
- Spouse: Patrick Haldner (m. 1998)
- Children: 2
- Parent(s): Georg Schierscher; Herlinde Marxer

Manuela Haldner-Schierscher (née Schierscher; born 26 June 1971) is a politician from Liechtenstein who has served in the Landtag of Liechtenstein since 2021.

== Life ==
Schierscher attended school in Schaan. She worked as an apprentice chemical laboratory technician at Ivoclar in Schaan from 1987 to 1990 before training as a medical masseuse in St. Gallen and Bad Ragaz. She is a qualified social worker and violence counsellor. From 2008 to 2021 she worked as social worker at the Liechtenstein Probation Service, and since 2021 she has been the head of the Liechtenstein victim office.

From 2007 to 2015 Haldner-Schierscher was a member of the Schaan municipal council as a member of the Free List. Since 2021, she has served in the Landtag of Liechtenstein. In addition, she is a member of the foreign affairs commission and judge selection committee. She is also a board member of the Free List.

Since 2008, Haldner-Schierscher, together with Rita Frommelt-Dörig, has been a part of the Zwietracht duo as cabaret performers in Austria, Liechtenstein and Switzerland. They performed their first full-length performance in 2018.

Haldner-Schierscher married Patrick Haldner on 30 December 1998, and they have two children together. She lives in Schaan.
