= Thomas Vogt (politician) =

Liechtenstein politician (born 1976)

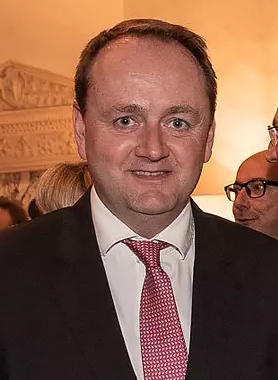
- Vogt in 2019

Member of the Landtag of Liechtenstein for Oberland
- Incumbent
- Assumed office 8 February 2009

Personal details
- Born: 24 February 1976 (age 49); Altstätten, Switzerland
- Political party: Patriotic Union
- Spouse: Sybille Ottmann (m. 2007)
- Children: 1

Thomas Vogt (born 24 February 1976) is a lawyer and politician from Liechtenstein who has served in the Landtag of Liechtenstein since 2009.

== Life ==
Vogt was born on 24 February 1976 in Altstätten as the son of Silvio Vogt and Margrit Gantenbein as one of two children. From 1988 to 1996, he attended school in Vaduz. From 1998 to 2003, he studied law at the University of Innsbruck. He worked as a legal advisor and financial assistant, and since 2009, he has worked as a self-employed lawyer.

He has been a member of the Landtag of Liechtenstein since 2009 as a member of the Patriotic Union. He has been a member of the Landtag's finance commission since 2009, and its chairman from 2019 to 2021. He was a member of Liechtenstein's commission to the European Economic Area from 2017 to 2021.

Vogt married lawyer Sybille Ottmann (born 19 January 1979) on 15 September 2007, and they have one child together. He lives in Triesen.
