= Franziska Hoop =

Liechtenstein politician (born 1990)

Vice President of the Landtag of Liechtenstein
- Incumbent
- Assumed office 10 April 2025
- President: Manfred Kaufmann
- Preceded by: Gunilla Marxer-Kranz

Member of the Landtag of Liechtenstein for Unterland
- Incumbent
- Assumed office 7 February 2021

Personal details
- Born: 31 May 1990 (age 36) Vaduz, Liechtenstein
- Party: Progressive Citizens' Party
- Spouse: Markus Otto
- Children: 1

Franziska Hoop (born 31 May 1990) is a politician from Liechtenstein who has as the Vice President of the Landtag of Liechtenstein since 2025. A member of the Progressive Citizens' Party (FBP), she has served in the Landtag since 2021.

== Life ==
Hoop was born on 31 May 1990 in Vaduz as the daughter of construction manager Alois Hoop and Doris (née Deucher) as one of three children. She attended primary school in Ruggell and then secondary school in Eschen. She conducted a commercial apprenticeship at the Liechtenstein National Administration. From 2014 she studied social pedagogy at the Eastern Switzerland University of Applied Sciences, where he graduated with a bachelor's degree in 2018, and in 2020 she obtained a certificate on a focus on child protection at the university.

Since 2010 she has worked as a trainer for the Liechtenstein team at the Special Olympics, and since 2016 as a social worker. From 2018 to 2021 she has been a board member of the Women in the FBP. Since 2021, she has been a member of the Landtag of Liechtenstein as a member of the Progressive Citizens' Party (FBP) and the head of the Liechtenstein delegation to the Parliamentary Assembly of the Council of Europe in Strasbourg.

Since 10 April 2025, she has been the Vice President of the Landtag of Liechtenstein.

She married Markus Otto and they have a child together. She lives in Ruggell.
