= Same-sex marriage in Liechtenstein =

Same-sex marriage has been legal in Liechtenstein since 1 January 2025. In November 2022, the Landtag passed a motion calling on the government to introduce a bill legalizing same-sex marriage, with broad support from across the political spectrum. A bill legalizing same-sex marriage was introduced in February 2024 and passed its final reading in the Landtag on 16 May 2024 by a 24–1 vote. It received royal assent from Prince Alois on 9 July and took effect on 1 January 2025. Polling suggests that a majority of Liechtensteiners support the legal recognition of same-sex marriage. Liechtenstein was the third European microstate, the 22nd country in Europe and the 37th in the world to legalize same-sex marriage.

Liechtenstein also recognized same-sex registered partnerships from 1 September 2011, following approval by voters in a referendum. It was the second country in the world to pass a partnership law by referendum, after Switzerland in 2005. Since the introduction of same-sex marriage on 1 January 2025, registered partnerships are no longer available in Liechtenstein.

== Registered partnerships ==
=== Background ===
On 19 November 2001, MP Paul Vogt from the Free List submitted a registered partnership initiative to the Landtag of Liechtenstein, which after a long discussion referred it to the cabinet for its opinion. The goal of reducing discrimination was undisputed; rather the kind of recognition and the timing compared to neighbouring countries were cause for discussion. On 15 April 2003, the cabinet published its position on the matter; it compared the legal situation in Liechtenstein to European countries with recognition of same-sex couples (e.g. Germany had recently introduced registered life partnerships), but also with neighbouring Austria and Switzerland, which had no legal recognition of same-sex couples at the time. As the cabinet saw no urgent need and preferred to await developments in Austria and especially Switzerland, it recommended rejection. On 14 May 2003, the Landtag rejected the initiative.

On 17 September 2007, Amnesty International submitted a petition calling for the legal recognition of same-sex couples. A subsequent motion put forward in the Landtag by the Free List requesting that the cabinet introduce a registered partnership law similar to Switzerland's passed on 24 October 2007 with 19 representatives voting in favour and 6 voting against.

24 October 2007 vote in the Landtag
Party	Voted for	Voted against	Absent (Did not vote)
G Progressive Citizens' Party	10: Alois Beck; Josy Biedermann; Markus Büchel; Doris Frommelt; Johannes Kaiser; Elmar Kindle; Peter Lampert; Wendelin Lampert; Klaus Wanger; Renate Wohlwend	2: Franz Heeb; Rudolf Lampert	–
G Patriotic Union	6: Marlies Amann-Marxer; Rony Bargetze; Arthur Brunhart; Henrik Caduff; Ivo Klein; Gebhard Negele	4: Doris Beck; Jürgen Beck; Günther Kranz; Heinz Vogt	–
Free List	3: Pepo Frick; Andrea Matt; Paul Vogt	–	–
Total	19	6	0
Total	76.0%	24.0%	0.0%

=== Passage of legislation in 2011 ===
In December 2009, Justice Minister Aurelia Frick announced she would finalise a draft of the registered partnership bill by January 2010. The draft was presented in April 2010. After the consultation period for the bill finished on 16 July, a few items were amended as a result of the discussion. The bill was described as very similar to the Austrian law passed in autumn 2009. In August 2010, Prince Alois declared his support for the proposal. On 23 November, the cabinet formulated the final version of the bill, which was approved by Parliament in its first reading on 16 December. It passed its second reading on 16 March 2011 in a 21–0 vote, and was published on 21 March as the Registered Partnership Act (German: Partnerschaftsgesetz).

16 March 2011 vote in the Landtag
Party	Voted for	Voted against	Absent (Did not vote)
G Patriotic Union	10: Marlies Amann-Marxer; Doris Beck; Gisela Biedermann; Arthur Brunhart; Peter Büchel; Diana Hilti; Peter Hilti; Werner Kranz; Gebhard Negele; Dominik Oehri (Note: Served as a substitute deputy for Günther Kranz in the afternoon session.)	–	3: Jürgen Beck; Harry Quaderer; Thomas Vogt
G Progressive Citizens' Party	10: Christian Batliner; Manfred Batliner; Gerold Büchel; Albert Frick; Doris Frommelt; Rainer Gopp; Johannes Kaiser; Peter Lampert; Wendelin Lampert; Renate Wohlwend	–	1: Elmar Kindle
Free List	1: Pepo Frick	–	–
Total	21	0	4
Total	84.0%	0.0%	16.0%

According to a report approved by the government in October 2022, the partnership law used "gender-equitable formulations" in its general clauses and legal definitions, implying that both same-sex and opposite-sex couples could enter into registered partnerships under the law. Registered partnerships were closed to new couples from 1 January 2025. Existing couples were entitled to retain their status as registered partners or convert their unions into recognized marriages.

=== Referendum ===
A group called Vox Populi ("Voice of the People") announced its intention to force a referendum on the new law. According to the Constitution of Liechtenstein, the organization had until 21 April (30 days) to collect at least 1,000 signatures. As the necessary signatures were gathered (1,208 valid signatures), a referendum was held between 17 and 19 June 2011. The registered partnership law was approved by 68.8 percent of those who voted and thus went into effect on 1 September 2011.

By municipality, the "Yes" vote received its largest support in Planken (at 73.4%), followed by Schaan (73.0%) and Ruggell (72.4%), whereas the highest "No" vote was recorded in Eschen (40.8%).

Breakdown of voting by municipality
Municipality	Yes (%)	Yes votes	No (%)	No votes	Formal total	Participation rate (%)
Balzers	71.6%	1,283	28.4%	510	1,793	74.4%
Eschen	59.2%	911	40.8%	627	1,538	74.9%
Gamprin	69.2%	439	30.8%	195	634	77.1%
Mauren	63.9%	870	36.1%	492	1,362	74.8%
Planken	73.4%	152	26.6%	55	207	85.4%
Ruggell	72.4%	602	27.6%	230	832	79.4%
Schaan	73.0%	1,518	27.0%	561	2,079	75.5%
Schellenberg	66.6%	291	33.4%	146	437	80.7%
Triesen	70.0%	1,155	30.0%	494	1,649	70.1%
Triesenberg	67.7%	781	32.3%	373	1,154	72.1%
Vaduz	70.6%	1,237	29.4%	516	1,753	71.4%
Liechtenstein	68.8%	9,239	31.3%	4,199	13,438	74.3%

=== Family name ===
In 2016, the cabinet reformed family name law. Registered partners were granted the possibility to have a common family name; however, it was simply called "name" as opposed to "family name" for married couples, thus keeping a distinction. The reform was discussed in the Landtag on 4 March at first reading, and was approved in its second and final reading on 31 August 2016 by a vote of 25–0. It was published in the official gazette on 3 November 2016 and took effect on 1 January 2017.

=== Adoption rights ===
On 15 June 2021, the State Court of Liechtenstein (Staatsgerichtshof) ruled that same-sex couples should have the right to adopt, and struck down the sections of the 2011 partnership law which had forbidden adoption by registered partners. It gave Parliament one year to rectify the issue. Following the court decision, the government drafted a bill granting same-sex couples the right to adopt their stepchildren (i.e. stepchild adoption), which was passed on 6 May 2022. On that same day, Parliament narrowly rejected an amendment that would have explicitly banned joint adoption and excluded same-sex couples from accessing assisted reproductive technology.

After a consultation period lasting from 6 July to 30 September 2022, the government passed a motion for full adoption equality on 31 October 2022. The proposal passed its first reading in the Landtag on 2 December by a 22 to 3 vote. It was approved in its final reading on 2 March, and went into effect on 1 June 2023.

=== Statistics ===
11 registered partnerships were performed in the first two years following the entry into force of the new law, eight between two men and three between two women. This made up 2.7% of all unions performed those two years. The number of registered partnerships performed in Liechtenstein per year is shown in the table below. The data is collected by the Office of Statistics (Amt für Statistik).

Number of partnerships registered in Liechtenstein
	2011	2012	2013	2014	2015	2016	2017	2018	2019	2020	2021	2022	2023	2024	Total
Female	2	1	1	0	0	2	0	1	3	2	1	1	3	6	23
Male	4	4	2	0	1	1	4	1	3	3	5	1	0	3	32
Total	6	5	3	0	1	3	4	2	6	5	6	2	3	9	55

== Same-sex marriage ==
Laws regarding same-sex partnerships in Europe¹ Marriage Civil union Limited domestic recognition (cohabitation) Unrecognized Constitution limits marriage to opposite-sex couples ¹ May include recent laws or court decisions that have not yet entered into effect.

=== Background ===
In June 2017, Justice Minister Aurelia Frick said she was open to a public debate on the legalisation of same-sex marriage. MP Daniel Seger from the Progressive Citizens' Party (FBP), who had helped draft the partnership law, welcomed the legalisation of same-sex marriage in Germany and hoped Liechtenstein would follow suit.

In 2018, a same-sex couple, Lukas Oehri and Dario Kleeb, were denied a marriage license at the Civil Registry Office in Vaduz. They filed suit in court, arguing that the same-sex marriage ban was a violation of the European Convention on Human Rights and the Constitution of Liechtenstein. The Administrative Court (VGH, Verwaltungsgerichtshof) ruled in the couple's favour, but the judgement was overturned on appeal by the State Court (StGH, Staatsgerichtshof) in September 2019. The StGH ruled, in case 2018/154, that banning same-sex marriage was not unconstitutional. However, the court concluded that several provisions of the 2011 partnership law were discriminatory, notably its provisions prohibiting registered partners from adopting. In response, the government announced it would evaluate the issue after "careful discussion". Eventually, legislation permitting same-sex registered partners to adopt went into effect in June 2023.

=== Passage of legislation in 2024 ===
Following the Swiss National Council's vote to legalize same-sex marriage on 11 June 2020, Amos Kaufmann from the LGBT group Flay expressed his hope that Liechtenstein would soon follow suit. The Liechtensteiner Vaterland newspaper wrote that the issue might "soon be on the political arena". Minister of Social Affairs Mauro Pedrazzini said he expected discussion on the issue to become quite present in the lead up to the February 2021 parliamentary election. A spokesman for the Pariotic Union (VU) said the party had "more pressing issues", but said they would follow the developments in Switzerland and take a formal decision later on. FBP party president Marcus Vogt said the party was still debating whether to take an official stance in support of same-sex marriage. In an interview with Radio Liechtenstein in February 2021, Prince Hans-Adam II expressed his support for same-sex marriage but said he opposed allowing same-sex couples to adopt. During the February 2021 election campaign, over 80% of candidates for the Landtag said they supported legalising same-sex marriage. Following the election, the Liechtensteiner Vaterland reported that there was a "solid majority" in the Landtag to legalise same-sex marriage. On 24 March, the VU and the FBP signed a coalition agreement, with the government programme including the promise that "legal certainty for non-traditional family models will be improved".

A survey conducted by the youth wing of the Free List party, leading up to the 2021 general election, showed that the vast majority of elected representatives supported same-sex marriage, with the Free List, the FBP, and a large majority of the VU in support. The 2 members of the minor Democrats for Liechtenstein party did not respond to the survey. 10 lawmakers were regarded as a "solid yes" vote, (Note: FBP (4; Franziska Hoop, Johannes Kaiser, Daniel Oehry, and Daniel Seger), VU (3; Dagmar Bühler-Nigsch, Walter Frick, and Norma Heidegger), and FL (3; Manuela Haldner-Schierscher, Georg Kaufmann, and Patrick Risch)) 9 as a "likely yes" vote, (Note: FBP (5; Wendelin Lampert, Bettina Petzold-Mähr, Sascha Quaderer, Sebastian Gassner, and Karin Zech-Hoop), and VU (4; Dietmar Lampert, Gunilla Marxer-Kranz, Thomas Vogt, and Mario Wohlwend)) 3 as a "likely no" vote, (Note: FBP (1; Albert Frick, although he was later one of the 15 signatories to a motion to open civil marriage to same-sex couples), and VU (2; Peter Frick and Günter Vogt)) and 1 as a "solid no" vote. (Note: VU (1; Manfred Kaufmann)) A majority of the 10 elected substitute members (who serve as substitute representatives in the event that an MP cannot attend a parliamentary session) also supported same-sex marriage. On 29 September 2021, the Landtag held a debate in which the majority of political parties broadly agreed that same-sex marriage should be legalized. It called for a public consultation process before legislating on the issue. On 11 August 2022, Prince Alois said that same-sex marriage was "not a major problem". On 21 September 2022, a motion calling on the government to introduce a bill legalizing same-sex marriage was submitted to the Landtag by 15 out of the 25 sitting members. (Note: The 15 members were Dagmar Bühler-Nigsch (VU), Albert Frick (FBP), Sebastian Gassner (FBP), Manuela Haldner-Schierscher (FL), Norma Heidegger (VU), Franziska Hoop (FBP), Johannes Kaiser (FBP), Georg Kaufmann (FL), Wendelin Lampert (FBP), Daniel Oehry (FBP), Bettina Petzold-Mähr (FBP), Sascha Quaderer (FBP), Patrick Risch (FL), Daniel Seger (FBP), and Karin Zech-Hoop (FBP), representing all members of the FBP (10) and the FL (3), along with 2 members of the VU.) The motion was discussed in the plenary session on 2 November 2022, and was passed by a 23–2 vote.

2 November 2022 vote in the Landtag
Party	Voted for	Voted against	Absent (Did not vote)
G Patriotic Union	10: Hubert Büchel (Note: Served as a substitute deputy for Mario Wohlwend throughout the plenary legislative session.); Dagmar Bühler-Nigsch; Peter Frick; Walter Frick; Norma Heidegger; Manfred Kaufmann; Dietmar Lampert; Gunilla Marxer-Kranz; Günter Vogt; Thomas Vogt	–	–
G Progressive Citizens' Party	10: Albert Frick; Sebastian Gassner; Franziska Hoop; Johannes Kaiser; Wendelin Lampert; Daniel Oehry; Bettina Petzold-Mähr; Sascha Quaderer; Daniel Seger; Karin Zech-Hoop	–	–
Free List	3: Manuela Haldner-Schierscher; Georg Kaufmann; Patrick Risch	–	–
Democrats for Liechtenstein	–	2: Herbert Elkuch; Thomas Rehak	–
Total	23	2	0
Total	92.0%	8.0%	0.0%

On 11 July 2023, the government approved a consultation report regarding proposed changes to three existing laws as part of the motion's implementation: the Marriage Act, the Partnership Act, and the Personal and Company Act. The consultation period ended on 10 October. In August 2023, Prime Minister Daniel Risch said that the legalization of same-sex marriage "should be coming very soon". On 6 February 2024, the government published the results of the consultation report and introduced a bill amending the three aforementioned laws to the Landtag. Under the proposal, no new registered partnerships would be established in Liechtenstein, although existing ones would continue to be recognised and could be converted into marriage via a simple procedure. The bill passed its first reading on 8 March with 24 votes in favor and one against.

8 March 2024 vote in the Landtag
Party	Voted for	Voted against	Absent (Did not vote)
G Patriotic Union	10: Hubert Büchel (Note: Served as a substitute deputy for Peter Frick throughout the plenary legislative session.); Dagmar Bühler-Nigsch; Walter Frick; Norma Heidegger; Manfred Kaufmann; Dietmar Lampert; Gunilla Marxer-Kranz; Günter Vogt; Thomas Vogt; Mario Wohlwend	–	–
G Progressive Citizens' Party	10: Albert Frick; Sebastian Gassner; Franziska Hoop; Johannes Kaiser; Wendelin Lampert; Daniel Oehry; Bettina Petzold-Mähr; Sascha Quaderer; Daniel Seger; Karin Zech-Hoop	–	–
Free List	3: Manuela Haldner-Schierscher; Georg Kaufmann; Patrick Risch	–	–
Democrats for Liechtenstein	1: Thomas Rehak	1: Herbert Elkuch	–
Total	24	1	0
Total	96.0%	4.0%	0.0%

A final vote on the legislation took place on 16 May, where it passed 24–1. Before the vote, parties agreed that the bill would not be amended and that no referendum would be initiated by the Landtag. The legislation received royal assent from Prince Alois and was published in the Liechtensteinisches Landesgesetzblatt on 9 July 2024. It came into effect on 1 January 2025. Article 1 of the Marriage Act (German: Ehegesetz) was amended to read:

Die Ehe ist die durch Vertrag begründete, volle und ungeteilte Lebensgemeinschaft zweier Menschen.

(Marriage is the full and undivided cohabitation of two people established by contract.)

=== Religious performance ===
The Catholic Church opposes same-sex marriage and does not allow its clergy to officiate at such marriages. In 2007, the Archbishop of Vaduz, Wolfgang Haas, criticized efforts to legalize same-sex registered partnerships, calling same-sex unions "[contradictions of] both the order of creation and the order of salvation". He reiterated his opposition in 2010, calling the introduction of registered partnerships "completely wrong". In March 2022, Haas called same-sex marriage a "diabolical attack [on marriage and the family]". Protesting the passage of a same-sex marriage motion in the Landtag, he announced in December 2022 that he would cancel a Mass traditionally held on New Year's Day at the opening session of Parliament. Haas said that same-sex marriage "runs counter to natural sensibility, to natural law in accordance with reason and, in particular, to the Christian concept of the human being." Prime Minister Risch criticized the cancellation, accusing Haas of "put[ing] the dividing before the unifying". In December 2023, the Holy See published Fiducia supplicans, a declaration allowing Catholic priests to bless couples who are not considered to be married according to church teaching, including the blessing of same-sex couples.

The Federation of Evangelical Lutheran Churches in Switzerland and the Principality of Liechtenstein does not perform same-sex marriages, but Hartwig Janus, the priest of the Vaduz church between 2004 and 2011, called for the acceptance of same-sex partnerships in 2010.

== Public opinion ==
In June 2017, following the approval of a same-sex marriage law by the German Bundestag, the Liechtensteiner Vaterland commissioned an online opinion poll wherein it asked its readers whether they supported or opposed the legalisation of same-sex marriages in Liechtenstein. 55% answered "yes and as quickly as possible" and another 14% answered "yes" but were opposed to or had difficulties supporting adoption by same-sex spouses. 27% opposed same-sex marriage, while the remaining 4% were undecided or indifferent.

A poll conducted in February 2021 by the Liechtenstein Institute (Liechtenstein-Institut) showed that a majority of voters from each political party answered positively when asked "Should same-sex couples have the same rights as heterosexual couples in all areas?". In total, 72% of voters supported same-sex marriage (48% "Yes", 24% "Rather Yes") and 28% opposed (14% "No", 14% "Rather No"). Voters from the Free List were the most supportive (96% in favour, 4% opposed), followed by voters from the Progressive Citizens' Party (74% in favour, 27% opposed), the Patriotic Union (68% in favour, 32% opposed), independents (65% in favour, 35% opposed) and the Democrats for Liechtenstein (55% in favour, 45% opposed).

== See also ==
- LGBT rights in Liechtenstein
- Recognition of same-sex unions in Europe
- Same-sex marriage in Austria
- Same-sex marriage in Switzerland
