= 2017 Liechtenstein general election =

- 5 February 2017
- All 25 seats in the Landtag; 13 seats needed for a majority
- Turnout: 77.82% (▼1.98pp)
Party	Leader	Vote %	Seats	+/–
FBP	Adrian Hasler	35.24	9	−1
VU	Thomas Zwiefelhofer	33.73	8	0
DU	Harry Quaderer	18.41	5	+1
FL	Ecki Hermann	12.62	3	0
This lists parties that won seats. See the complete results below.
Vote share by municipality
Prime Minister before	Prime Minister after
Adrian Hasler; FBP	Adrian Hasler; FBP

General elections were held in Liechtenstein on 5 February 2017 to elect the 25 members of the Landtag. The Progressive Citizens' Party (FBP) won a plurality of nine seats, with the Patriotic Union (VU) winning eight. The Independents (DU) and Free List (FL) won five and three seats respectively. Voter turnout was 77.8%.

Incumbent prime minister Adrian Hasler of the FBP sought re-election for a second term, while the VU nominated incumbent deputy prime minister, Thomas Zwiefelhofer, and the Free List nominated Ecki Hermann for the position. Following the elections, the FBP and VU formed a renewed coalition, ultimately under the leadership of Hasler. The new government was sworn in on 30 March 2017.

== Background ==
In the 2013 elections the Progressive Citizens' Party (FBP) won ten seats, and the Patriotic Union (VU) won eight seats, while the newly-formed The Independents (DU) won four seats, and the Free List won three seats. This was the first time in Liechtenstein's history that four parties held seats in the Landtag. As a result, the FBP and VU formed a coalition government, with Adrian Hasler continuing as prime minister.

Hasler's term was marked by restructuring Liechtenstein's state budget. His government continued and expanded the tax cooperation agreements that had been done by his predecessors following the 2008 Liechtenstein tax affair, signing tax agreements with numerous countries. His government was also responsible for establishing an asylum task force, and then an amendment to the Liechtenstein asylum law in response to the 2015 European migrant crisis.

Gerold Büchel of the FBP resigned in December 2015 due to a change in residence to the Oberland constituency and was succeeded by Rainer Gopp.

== Landtag members not running for re-election ==
Member	Constituency	First elected	Party
Christoph Beck	Oberland	2013	Patriotic Union
Alois Beck	Oberland	Feb 1993	Progressive Citizens' Party
Christian Batliner	Oberland	2009	Progressive Citizens' Party
Christine Wohlwend	Oberland	2013	Progressive Citizens' Party
Judith Oehri	Unterland	2013	Patriotic Union
Peter Büchel	Unterland	2009	Patriotic Union
Manfred Batliner	Unterland	2009	Progressive Citizens' Party
Rainer Gopp	Unterland	2015	Progressive Citizens' Party

== Electoral system ==
The 25 members of the Landtag are elected by open list proportional representation from two constituencies, Oberland with 15 seats and Unterland with 10 seats. Voters voted for a party list and then may have struck through candidates for whom they did not wish to cast a preferential vote, and may also have added names of candidates from other lists. The electoral threshold to win a seat was 8%. Landtag members sit for a four-year term. Once formed, the Landtag elected the prime minister and two government councillors who were then appointed by the reigning prince to govern in a cabinet. Voting was compulsory by law, and those who failed to vote without a valid reason may be fined, but it was not enforced. Polling stations were open only for one and a half hours on election day. Citizens over 18 years of age who had been resident in the country for at least one month prior to election day were eligible to vote.

== Campaign ==
=== Main parties ===
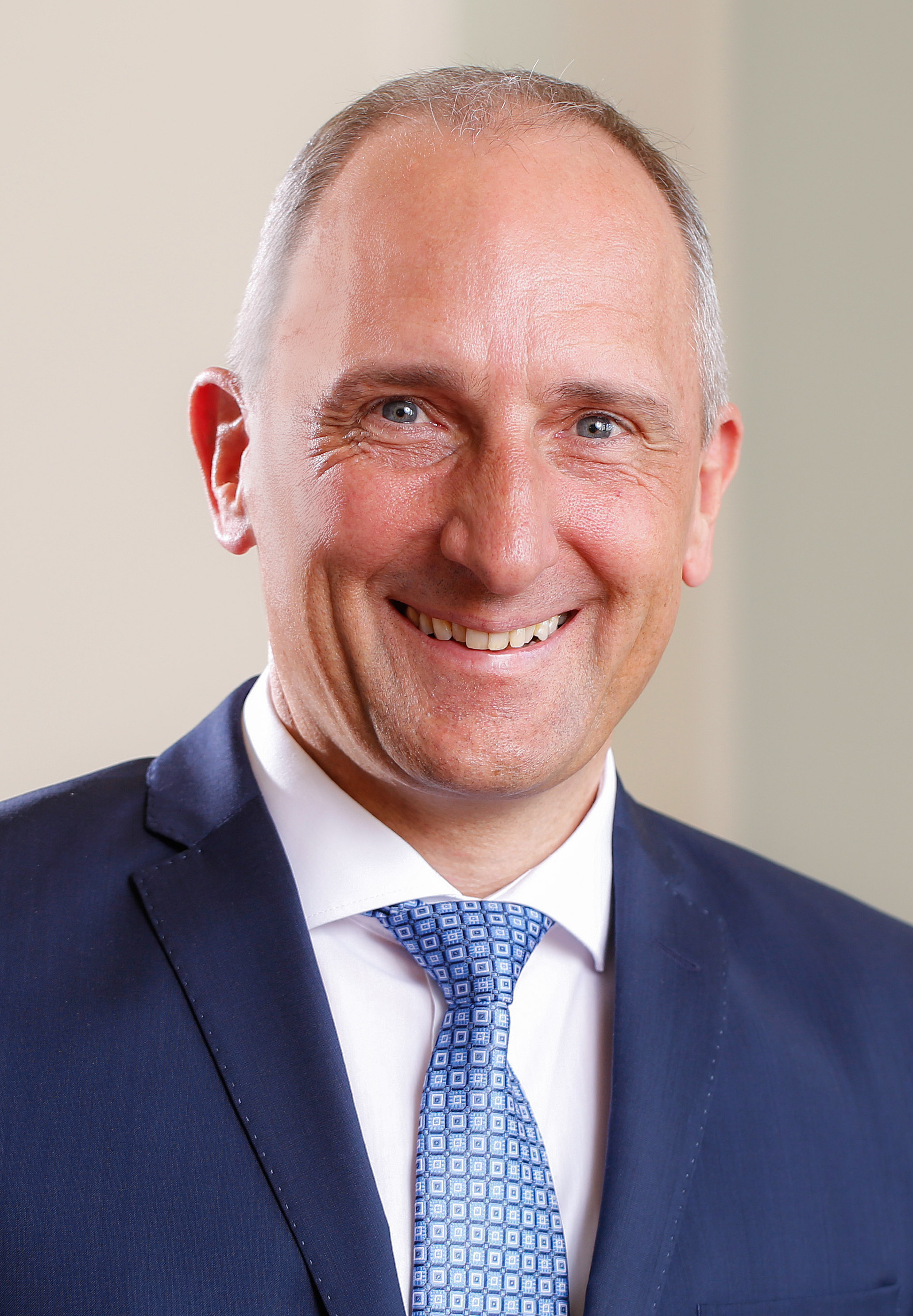
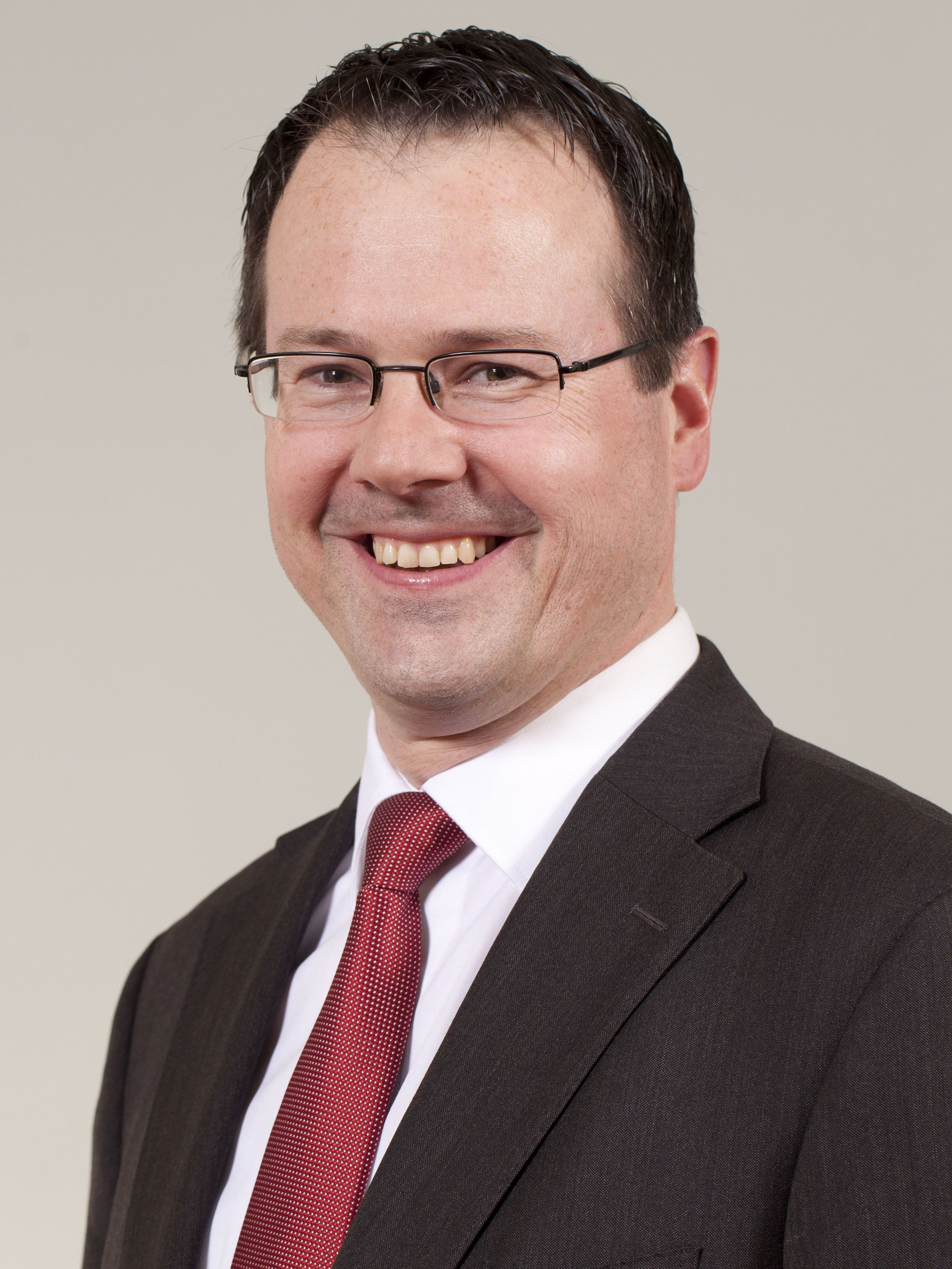
Adrian Hasler (left) and Thomas Zwiefelhofer (right) were the FBP and VU's respective nominations for prime minister

Hasler was expected to seek a second term, and was re-nominated by the FBP on 18 August 2016. Additionally, the party nominated incumbent government councillors Mauro Pedrazzini and Aurelia Frick as government candidates. The party launched its campaign on 22 August, with the slogan "Much achieved. Much to do" (German: Viel erreicht. Viel vor), and with the aim of remaining the largest party in the Landtag. The FBP's programme included policies such as supporting apprenticeship programs, strengthening the role of teachers, improvements to broadband, and keeping basic medical costs on the same level as Switzerland.

The VU re-nominated incumbent deputy prime minister Thomas Zwiefelhofer for prime minister on 17 June 2016, who had also been the candidate in 2013. Additionally, the party nominated Daniel Risch and Dominique Gantenbein as government candidates. The party launched its campaign on 21 September, with the slogan "Making more possible. For you and our country" (German: Mehr möglich machen. Für Dich und unser Land). Zwiefelhofer stated that he would not be a part of the next government should the party lose the election. The VU's programme included policies such as favourable conditions for business and maintaining a balanced budget.

Major issues of the election were healthcare and the consolidation of the state budget. During campaigning, Hasler came under controversy due to an ongoing dispute with the Liechtenstein mandatory health insurance (OKP), in which Zwiefelhofer, as the junior coalition party, demanded the VU's involvement. However, the newspaper Liewo Sonntagszeitung described the run-up to the election as "a campaign without fire" and "lacklustre". A January 2017 poll by the newspaper Liechtensteiner Vaterland suggested that 50% of respondents would support another coalition government between the FBP and VU. Both parties stated that they were open to the formation of a coalition with the other.

=== Opposition parties ===
The Independents, led by Harry Quaderer, did not present any candidates for government. However, the FBP declared the party as a potential coalition partner; Quaderer rejected this, stating that forming a coalition with a major party would only be possible if the "party agrees to the demands we will make". According to polling, the party was expected to perform well, perhaps receiving up to 20% of the vote. The party did not adopt a manifesto for the election, instead relying on party "positions".

The Free List nominated physician Ecki Hermann for prime minister on 26 September 2016. Additionally, it also nominated Thomas Lageder as a government candidate. The party stated that it was open to the formation of a coalition government with other parties. However, both the FBP and VU ruled out a coalition with the Free List due to policy differences. The party campaigned on social issues such as distributive justice.

== Opinion polls ==
Opinion polls
Source	Date	VU	FBP	DU	FL	Other
Hoi DU	February 2016	34%	31%	21%	13%	—
Vaterland	Autumn 2015	34.5%	31.3%	21%	13.1%	—

== Candidates ==
Candidates had the same eligibility criteria as voters. Political parties in Liechtenstein required the support of 30 voters from a constituency to be eligible to nominate a candidate list in it. The election saw the highest number of candidates running in Liechtenstein's history to that point with 71 candidates; 52 men and 19 women.

Oberland	FBP	VU	DU
Oberland	Wendelin Lampert; Albert Frick; Daniel Seger; Eugen Nägele; Susanne Eberle-Strub; Michael Ospelt; Marcel Gstöhl; Clarissa Frommelt; Peter Banzer; Martina Haas; Andrea Häring; Adriana Nentwich-Tomasoni	Christoph Wenaweser; Manfred Kaufmann; Günter Vogt; Thomas Vogt; Frank Konrad; Rainer Beck; Christine Schädler; Rainer Wolfinger; Karin Rüdisser-Quaderer; Dominik Hemmerle; Nils Vogt; Alexandra Schädler; Ernst Trefzer; Jnes Rampone-Wanger; Gerald Luchs	Harry Quaderer; Jürgen Beck; Thomas Rehak; Ado Vogt; Pio Schurti; Othmar Züger; Pascal Willi; Siegfried Sele; Isolde Hermann-Jehle; Johann Beck; Burgi Beck
Oberland	FL		
Oberland	Georg Kaufmann; Thomas Lageder; Helen Konzett Bargetze; Walter Kranz; Conny Büchel Brühwiler; Richard Brunhart		
Unterland	FBP	VU	DU
Unterland	Johannes Kaiser; Elfried Hasler; Johannes Hasler; Daniel Oehry; Alexander Batliner; Norman Walch; Bruno Matt; Veronika Hilti-Wohlwend; Judith Spalt; Elmar Gangl	Violanda Lanter-Koller; Mario Wohlwend; Guinilla Marxer-Kranz; Peter Frick; Rainer Ritter; Dominik Oehri; Peter Büchel; Elisabeth Stock-Gstöhl; Gustav Gstöhl; Rainer Batliner	Herbert Elkuch; Erich Hasler; Peter Wachter; Agnes Dentsch; Werner Dolzer-Müssner
Unterland	FL		
Unterland	Patrick Risch; Wolfgang Marxer		
Source: Landtagswahl 2017

== Results ==
The FBP received 35.2% of the vote, a 4.8% decrease from their 2013 performance, and won nine seats in the Landtag, a decrease of one. The VU received 33.7% of the vote, a 0.1% increase from 2013, and maintained their eight seats. The DU saw its vote share rise from 15.3% to 18.4% from 2013, and won five seats at an increase of one, the highest of any third party in Liechtenstein's history to that point. The Free List received 12.6% of the vote, an increase of 1.4% from 2013, and maintained its three seats.

A total of 15,413 ballots were cast, resulting in a 77.8% voter turnout. The majority of votes (96%) were cast by post.

Party	Votes	%	Seats	+/–
Progressive Citizens' Party	68,673	35.24	9	–1
Patriotic Union	65,742	33.73	8	0
The Independents	35,885	18.41	5	+1
Free List	24,595	12.62	3	0
Total	194,895	100.00	25	0
Valid votes	14,768	95.82		
Invalid/blank votes	645	4.18		
Total votes	15,413	100.00		
Registered voters/turnout	19,806	77.82		
Source: Landtagswahl 2017

=== By electoral district ===
Electoral district	Seats	Electorate	Party	Candidates	Subsititutes	Votes	%	Swing	Seats won	+/–
Oberland	15	12,814	Patriotic Union	Christoph Wenaweser; Manfred Kaufmann; Günter Vogt; Thomas Vogt; Frank Konrad	Rainer Beck	48,789	34.4	▼0.2	5	0
Oberland	15	12,814	Progressive Citizens' Party	Wendelin Lampert; Albert Frick; Daniel Seger; Eugen Nägele; Susanne Eberle-Strub	Michael Ospelt	47,747	33.7	▼5.6	5	▼1
Oberland	15	12,814	The Independents	Harry Quaderer; Jürgen Beck; Thomas Rehak	Ado Vogt	26,452	18.6	▲3.9	3	▲1
Oberland	15	12,814	Free List	Georg Kaufmann; Thomas Lageder	Helen Konzett Bargetze	18,882	11.8	▲2.1	2	0
Unterland	10	6,992	Progressive Citizens' Party	Johannes Kaiser; Elfried Hasler; Johannes Hasler; Daniel Oehry	Alexander Batliner	20,941	39.4	▼2.5	4	0
Unterland	10	6,992	Patriotic Union	Violanda Lanter-Koller; Mario Wohlwend; Guinilla Marxer-Kranz	Peter Frick	16,995	32.0	▲1.1	3	0
Unterland	10	6,992	The Independents	Herbert Elkuch; Erich Hasler	Peter Wachter	9,449	17.8	▲1.0	2	0
Unterland	10	6,992	Free List	Patrick Risch	Wolfgang Marxer	5,715	10.8	▲0.4	1	0
Source: Landtagswahlen 2017

=== Votes by candidate ===
Constituency	Party	Candidate	Votes
Oberland	Progressive Citizens' Party	Wendelin Lampert	3,699
Oberland	Progressive Citizens' Party	Albert Frick	3,462
Oberland	Progressive Citizens' Party	Daniel Seger	3,289
Oberland	Progressive Citizens' Party	Eugen Nägele	3,075
Oberland	Progressive Citizens' Party	Susanne Eberle-Strub	3,057
Oberland	Progressive Citizens' Party	Michael Ospelt	2,991
Oberland	Progressive Citizens' Party	Marcel Gstöhl	2,839
Oberland	Progressive Citizens' Party	Clarissa Frommelt	2,781
Oberland	Progressive Citizens' Party	Peter Banzer	2,675
Oberland	Progressive Citizens' Party	Martina Haas	2,585
Oberland	Progressive Citizens' Party	Andrea Häring	2,526
Oberland	Progressive Citizens' Party	Adriana Nentwich-Tomasoni	2,100
Oberland	Progressive Citizens' Party	Jnes Rampone-Wanger	2,488
Oberland	Progressive Citizens' Party	Gerald Luchs	2,430
Oberland	Progressive Citizens' Party	Ernst Trefzer	2,677
Oberland	Patriotic Union	Christoph Wenaweser	3,364
Oberland	Patriotic Union	Manfred Kaufmann	3,135
Oberland	Patriotic Union	Günter Vogt	3,090
Oberland	Patriotic Union	Thomas Vogt	3,082
Oberland	Patriotic Union	Frank Konrad	3,034
Oberland	Patriotic Union	Rainer Beck	2,954
Oberland	Patriotic Union	Christine Schädler	2,899
Oberland	Patriotic Union	Rainer Wolfinger	2,892
Oberland	Patriotic Union	Karin Rüdisser-Quaderer	2,863
Oberland	Patriotic Union	Dominik Hemmerle	2,828
Oberland	Patriotic Union	Nils Vogt	2,823
Oberland	Patriotic Union	Alexandra Schädler	2,740
Oberland	Patriotic Union	Ernst Trefzer	2,677
Oberland	The Independents	Harry Quaderer	2,327
Oberland	The Independents	Jürgen Beck	2,032
Oberland	The Independents	Thomas Rehak	1,970
Oberland	The Independents	Ado Vogt	1,929
Oberland	The Independents	Pio Schurti	1,780
Oberland	The Independents	Othmar Züger	1,711
Oberland	The Independents	Pascal Willi	1,698
Oberland	The Independents	Siegfried Sele	1,507
Oberland	The Independents	Isolde Hermann-Jehle	1,403
Oberland	The Independents	Johann Beck	1,388
Oberland	The Independents	Burgi Beck	1,318
Oberland	Free List	Georg Kaufmann	1,603
Oberland	Free List	Thomas Lageder	1,571
Oberland	Free List	Helen Konzett Bargetze	1,548
Oberland	Free List	Walter Kranz	1,407
Oberland	Free List	Conny Büchel Brühwiler	1,346
Oberland	Free List	Richard Brunhart	1,249
Unterland	Progressive Citizens' Party	Johannes Kaiser	2,080
Unterland	Progressive Citizens' Party	Elfried Hasler	2,061
Unterland	Progressive Citizens' Party	Johannes Hasler	2,021
Unterland	Progressive Citizens' Party	Daniel Oehry	1,991
Unterland	Progressive Citizens' Party	Alexander Batliner	1,861
Unterland	Progressive Citizens' Party	Norman Walch	1,835
Unterland	Progressive Citizens' Party	Bruno Matt	1,707
Unterland	Progressive Citizens' Party	Veronika Hilti-Wohlwend	1,685
Unterland	Progressive Citizens' Party	Judith Spalt	1,532
Unterland	Progressive Citizens' Party	Elmar Gangl	1,305
Unterland	Patriotic Union	Violanda Lanter-Koller	1,918
Unterland	Patriotic Union	Mario Wohlwend	1,642
Unterland	Patriotic Union	Gunilla Marxer-Kranz	1,635
Unterland	Patriotic Union	Peter Frick	1,495
Unterland	Patriotic Union	Rainer Ritter	1,490
Unterland	Patriotic Union	Dominik Oehri	1,489
Unterland	Patriotic Union	Peter Büchel	1,479
Unterland	Patriotic Union	Elisabeth Stock-Gstöhl	1,415
Unterland	Patriotic Union	Gustav Gstöhl	1,380
Unterland	Patriotic Union	Rainer Batliner	1,298
Unterland	The Independents	Herbert Elkuch	1,666
Unterland	The Independents	Erich Hasler	1,249
Unterland	The Independents	Peter Wachter	868
Unterland	The Independents	Agnes Dentsch	773
Unterland	The Independents	Werner Dolzer-Müssner	693
Unterland	Free List	Patrick Risch	893
Unterland	Free List	Wolfgang Marxer	808

== Aftermath ==
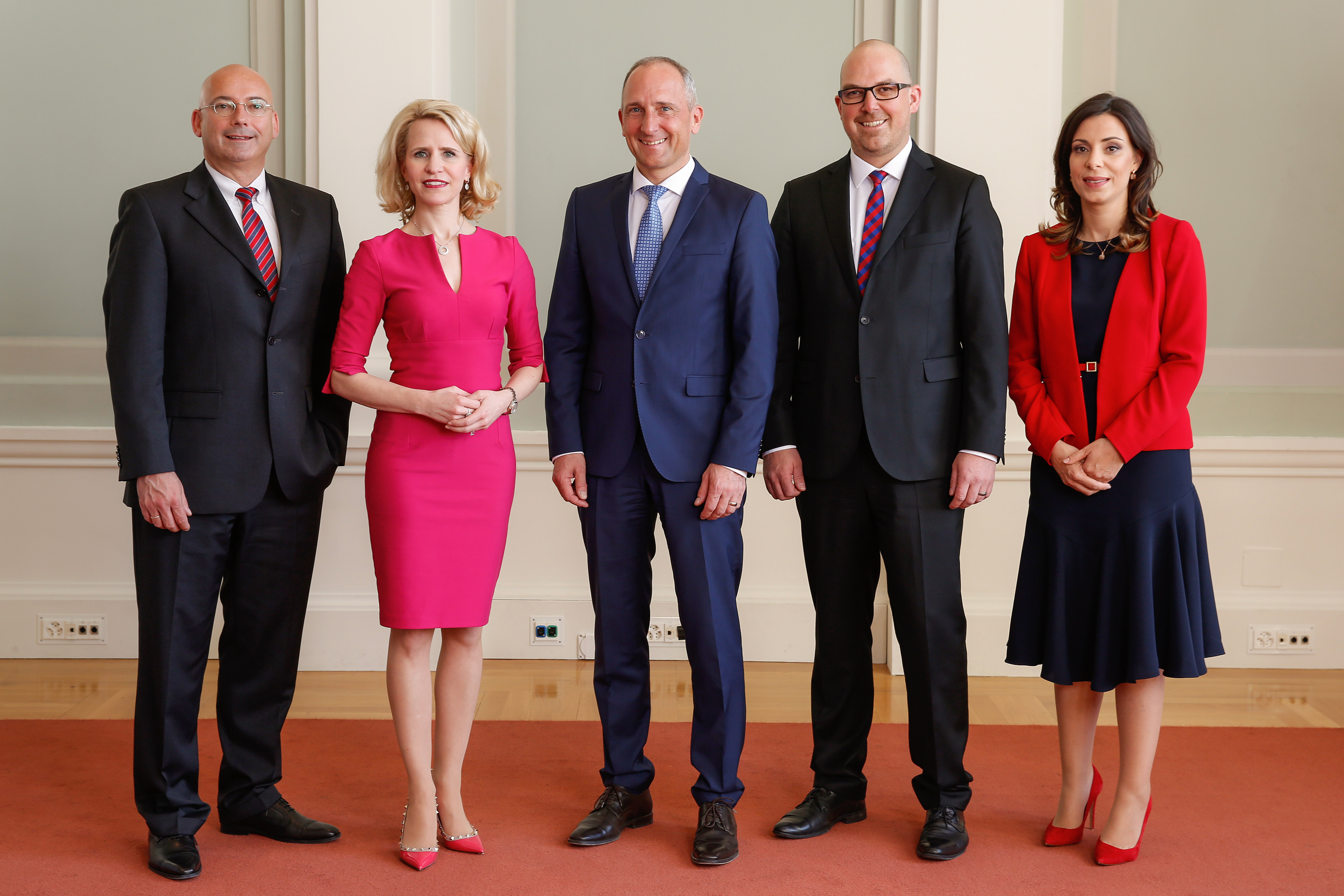
The government of Adrian Hasler

The day after the election, Zwiefelhofer announced his resignation as deputy prime minister. The FBP invited the VU to begin negotiations for a renewed coalition government, which the VU accepted. The two parties entered into a renewed coalition government, ultimately under the leadership of Hasler. As the junior party in the coalition, Daniel Risch became deputy prime minister. The new government was sworn in on 30 March 2017. Albert Frick of the FBP was re-elected as President of the Landtag, with Gunilla Marxer-Kranz of the VU as vice president.

A survey published by Wilfried Marxer of the Liechtenstein Institute suggested that a majority of the respondents who voted for the VU did so because of the party's Landtag candidates. On the other hand, voters for the FBP cited the party's government team as the reason for their vote. Voters for the DU and Free List cited party policies. The poll also suggested that Hasler was a more popular candidate than Zwiefelhofer, as Hasler had a generally higher sympathy rating from respondents; in the scenario of the prime minister being directly elected, 48% of respondents would have voted for Hasler, compared to 34% for Zwiefelhofer and 18% for Hermann.

== See also ==
- Elections in Liechtenstein
- List of Liechtenstein general elections

== Bibliography ==
- Marxer, Wilfried (2017). Lantagswahlen vom 5 Februar 2017: Ergebnisse Einer Umfrage [State elections of 5 February 2017: Survey results] (PDF) (in German). Bendern: Liechtenstein-Institut.
