= Human rights in Liechtenstein =

Liechtenstein, a multiparty constitutional monarchy with a unicameral parliament and a government chosen by the reigning prince at its direction, is generally considered to be a prosperous and free country with an excellent human-rights record.

== Fundamental freedoms ==
Article 31 of Liechtenstein's Constitution guarantees equal treatment of all citizens. Elections are free and fair. Human-rights groups are freely allowed to investigate conditions in Liechtenstein. The country recognizes freedom of speech and of the press, although public insult directed against any racial or ethnic group can be punished by up to two years in prison. There are no Internet restrictions. People in Liechtenstein enjoy academic freedom, religious freedom, freedom of movement within the country, and the right to travel abroad, to emigrate, and to repatriate. The right of free assembly and of free association is guaranteed by article 41 of the Constitution and by article 11 of the ECHR. "All public, non-religious events necessitating official measures and especially security measures require approval in Liechtenstein," according to a government report. "Political and educational events in particular are exempt. For the (few) demonstrations that have so far taken place in Liechtenstein, approval has always been granted."

According to a 2003 report by the government of Liechtenstein, anyone in the country "who believes that his or her fundamental rights and freedoms have been violated is entitled to apply to the courts or to file a complaint on the matter. Relief may take the form, inter alia, of an order to set aside an administrative or government decision, or an order for the payment of compensatory, nominal or substantial damages. It is the function of the Constitutional Court (Staatsgerichtshof) of Liechtenstein to rule on the constitutionality of existing laws and, where necessary, to render void laws or ordinances, or parts thereof. An appeal may also be lodged, in specific cases, with the European Court of Human Rights in Strasbourg, Liechtenstein having acceded, on 8 September 1982, to the European Convention for the Protection of Human Rights and Fundamental Freedoms of 4 November 1950. Such appeals are subject to the condition that all avenues of domestic remedies within Liechtenstein have been exhausted."

== Rights related to asylum, refugee status, and citizenship ==
The laws of Liechtenstein allow for the granting of asylum or refugee status, although none of the 88 asylum applications submitted between January and September 2010 were successful. Two 2010 reports by the UN Committee against Torture and the UNHCR said that the requirement that asylum seekers "under preventive expulsion" request a hearing within 24 hours was too short. A 2012 report by a committee of the UN's Office of the High Commissioner on Human Rights asked that the principality “consider amending the Asylum Law to provide for facilitated naturalization of refugees and stateless persons.” The same report recommended that Liechtenstein also "consider amending the Act on Facilitated Naturalization with a view to reducing the required period of residence for the acquisition of citizenship and consider introducing the right to appeal and legal review under the ordinary naturalization procedure subject to municipal popular votes."

== Racial discrimination ==
Discrimination on the basis of race or ethnicity is forbidden. In connection with its 2000 ratification of the 1965 International Convention on the Elimination of All Forms of Racial Discrimination, Liechtenstein tightened provisions in its legal code related to racial discrimination. Right-wing extremists have attacked foreigners, mainly Turks, from time to time. The head of a group of skinheads who threatened and injured a Turkish business owner in 2009 was fined 1000 Swiss francs. An arsonist who attacked a kebab shop in 2010 was sentenced to two and a half years in prison. A 2006 UNESCO report expressed concern about the persistence in Liechtenstein of "xenophobia and intolerance against persons of different ethnic origin or religion, particularly against Muslims and persons of Turkish origin."

== Women's rights and abortion ==
Women's suffrage in Liechtenstein was introduced on 1 July 1984. The country was the last in Europe to introduce this right.

Since January 1996, Liechtenstein has been a signatory of the 1979 Convention on the Elimination of All Forms of Discrimination against Women. Discrimination on the basis of gender is illegal. Rape, domestic violence, and sexual harassment are crimes. The government provides for a wide range of assistance to victims of domestic violence, and Frauenhaus, a women's shelter, provides shelter and counseling to women and children. The Equal Opportunity Office and Commission on Equality between Women and Men work to ensure equal rights. A 2012 report by a committee of the UN's Office of the High Commissioner for Human Rights asked Liechtenstein to "ensure that migrant women and other women in vulnerable situations, including those subjected to trafficking, domestic violence or who are divorced, are able to retain their residency status and socio-economic situation and are not subject to double discrimination."

Abortion in Liechtenstein is illegal in most circumstances: it is also an offence to give advice about procedures, and to inform people on how to travel abroad in order to access services. Medical doctors, the woman, or any other person involved in an abortion can be fined and imprisoned.

== Family and children's rights ==
A child with one parent who is a citizen of Liechtenstein automatically becomes a citizen, as do children born in the country who would otherwise be stateless. Statutory rape is punishable by 1–10 years in prison; the age of consent is 14. Three NGOs that monitor children's rights enjoy government financial support; the Office for Social Services oversees government programs for children. Liechtenstein's first Ombudsperson for children was appointed in 2009, and a report by a UN committee on children's rights recommended that the principality ensure that the office is independent and sufficiently staffed and funded.

Although Liechtenstein's family law reform of 1992/1993 largely put an end to the differential treatment of children born out of wedlock, custody of such children is still routinely granted only to the mother. To be sure, the parents may apply jointly for joint custody, which may be granted if they live with the child and if authorities consider the situation acceptable.

== LGBT rights ==
An official 2007 study provided evidence of homophobic discrimination. Posters put up in 2009 by the Office of Equal Opportunity to discourage homophobic attitudes were sprayed with homophobic slogans. No arrests were made.

In 2011, the Liechtenstein parliament unanimously adopted a law permitting registered partnerships for gay couples, and in a referendum held in June of that year, Liechtenstein voters approved of the new law, with 68.8 percent supporting it.

Legislation legalising same-sex marriage in Liechtenstein was passed in 2024, and took effect on 1 January 2025.

== Employment rights ==
All workers have the right to unionize and bargain collectively. Liechtenstein's one trade union represents about 3 percent of employed persons; collective bargaining agreements cover about 25 percent. Children over 14 who have left school may work on a limited basis; those still in school may work for no more than nine hours a week performing light duties. There is no officially established minimum wage, although the Liechtenstein Workers Association, Chamber of Commerce, and the Chamber for Economic Affairs set an effective minimum wage in annual negotiations. The maximum workweek is 45 hours for white-collar workers and 48 hours for others. Working on Sunday is illegal, with few exceptions. Workers living in Switzerland and Austria are covered by the same rules.

== Rights relating to arrest, trial, and punishment ==
Arrest warrants are issued by the national court. Within 48 hours of arresting a suspect, police must bring the individual before a magistrate who must either file formal charges or order the prisoner's release. Defendants have a right to counsel, and those who cannot pay for a lawyer are provided with one at the government's expense.

Liechtenstein guarantees the right to a fair trial by a single judge, a panel of judges, or a jury, depending on the seriousness of the case.

The conditions in Liechtenstein's prison meet international standards. Under a 1982 treaty, convicts sentenced to over two years in prison are imprisoned in Austria. Prison conditions are monitored by independent body, the Corrections Commission, which makes at least one unannounced visit to the prison per quarter, during which it speaks to prisoners out of the presence of prison officials. Arbitrary arrest and detention are illegal. Under the Juvenile Court Act, juvenile offenders are imprisoned separately from adults. This is also forbidden by the Convention on the Rights of the Child, of which Liechtenstein is a signatory.

The death penalty was abolished in Liechtenstein in 1989.

== Office of Equal Opportunity ==
The Office of Equal Opportunity oversees the enforcement of human rights in Liechtenstein. When it was formed in 1996, its focus was on sexual equality; it now also has oversight over such issues as "migration and integration of foreigners, disability, social discrimination and sexual orientation." Its role includes "advising and making recommendations to authorities and private parties, carrying out investigations, participating in the development and enactment of national programs relevant to its mandate, and carrying out projects to further its aims." Amnesty International has expressed concern about the OEO's limited resources. Originally staffed by two full-time employees and an intern, it now has only one full-time staffer.

Amnesty International's first Universal Periodic Review of Liechtenstein in 2008 called for the establishment of “an ombudsman institution and a national human rights institution in accordance with the Paris Principles,” and a 2012 Amnesty International report regretted Liechtenstein's failure to follow this suggestion and expressed concern "that the alternative mechanisms already in place, including the Office for Equal Opportunity and the planned Ombudsman for children, do not fully meet the criteria by the Paris Principles and are not the appropriate authorities to consider cases of human rights violations."

A 2012 report by a committee of the Office of the UN's High Commissioner on Human Rights similarly recommended that the Office of Equal Opportunity and other such government agencies in the principality be replaced with “a single independent human rights institution with a broad mandate.”

== Participation in basic human rights treaties ==
UN core treaties	Participation of Liechtenstein	CoE core treaties	Participation of Liechtenstein
Convention on the Elimination of All Forms of Racial Discrimination	Member since 2000	European Convention on Human Rights	Member since 1982
International Covenant on Civil and Political Rights	Member since 1998	Protocol 1 (ECHR)	Member since 1995
First Optional Protocol (ICCPR)	Member since 1998	Protocol 4 (ECHR)	Member since 2005
Second Optional Protocol (ICCPR)	Member since 1998	Protocol 6 (ECHR)	Member since 1990
International Covenant on Economic, Social and Cultural Rights	Member since 1998	Protocol 7 (ECHR)	Member since 2005
Convention on the Elimination of All Forms of Discrimination Against Women	Member since 1995	Protocol 12 (ECHR)	Signed in 2000
Optional Protocol (CEDAW)	Member since 2001	Protocol 13 (ECHR)	Member since 2003
United Nations Convention Against Torture	Member since 1990	European Social Charter	Signed in 1991
Optional Protocol (CAT)	Member since 2006	Additional Protocol of 1988 (ESC)	Not signed
Convention on the Rights of the Child	Member since 1995	Additional Protocol of 1995 (ESC)	Not signed
Optional Protocol on the Involvement of Children in Armed Conflict (CRC)	Member since 2005	Revised European Social Charter	Not signed
Optional Protocol on the sale of children, child prostitution and child pornography (CRC-OP-SC)	Signed in 2000	European Convention for the Prevention of Torture and Inhuman or Degrading Treatment or Punishment	Member since 1992
Convention on the Protection of the Rights of All Migrant Workers and Members of Their Families	Not signed	European Charter for Regional or Minority Languages	Member since 1998
Convention on the Rights of Persons with Disabilities	Member since 2023	Framework Convention for the Protection of National Minorities	Member since 1998
Optional Protocol (CRPD)	Not signed	Convention on Action against Trafficking in Human Beings	Member since 2016

== Works cited ==
- "Liechtenstein". 2010 Country Reports on Human Rights Practices. US Department of State. 8 April 2011.
- "Consideration of reports submitted by states parties under Article 40 of the Covenant: Initial Report: Liechtenstein" (PDF), International covenant on civil and political rights, United Nations, 24 June 2003, archived from the original (PDF) on 13 December 2023
