= Daniel Seger =

Liechtenstein politician (born 1977)

Member of the Landtag of Liechtenstein for Oberland
- Incumbent
- Assumed office 5 February 2017

Personal details
- Born: 24 April 1977 (age 49) Grabs, Switzerland
- Party: Progressive Citizens' Party

Daniel F. Seger (born 24 April 1977) is a lawyer and politician from Liechtenstein who has served in the Landtag of Liechtenstein since 2017.

== Life ==
Seger was born on 24 April 1977 in Grabs, Switzerland as the son of gardener Bernhard Seger and Rita Vogt as one of two children. He attended the Liechtensteinisches Gymnasium in Vaduz. From 1997 to 2003 he studied law at the University of St. Gallen and from 2004 to 2007 he worked in various internships including law firms, regional courts and the government legal service. In 2008 he was admitted to the Liechtenstein bar and worked as a legal consultant at Hilti in Schaan. Since 2013, he has worked as a self-employed lawyer initially in Triesenberg, but since 2018 in Schaan.

He was the president of the FLay - Gays and Lesbians Liechtenstein and Rhine Valley from 2008 to 2011. He campaigned for the introduction of a same-sex registered partnership law, which was introduced in 2011. From 2009 to 2013 he was the vice president of the Liechtenstein VBK, and its president from 2013 to 2017.

Since 2017, Seger has been a member of the Landtag of Liechtenstein as a member of the Progressive Citizens' Party. He was a member of the judges selection committee from 2018 to 2021. Since 2021, he has been a member of the audit committee and a member of the Liechtenstein delegation to the European Economic Area and European Free Trade Association. As a member of the Landtag, he has been an advocate for further LGBTQ rights in Liechtenstein.
