= Healthcare in Liechtenstein =

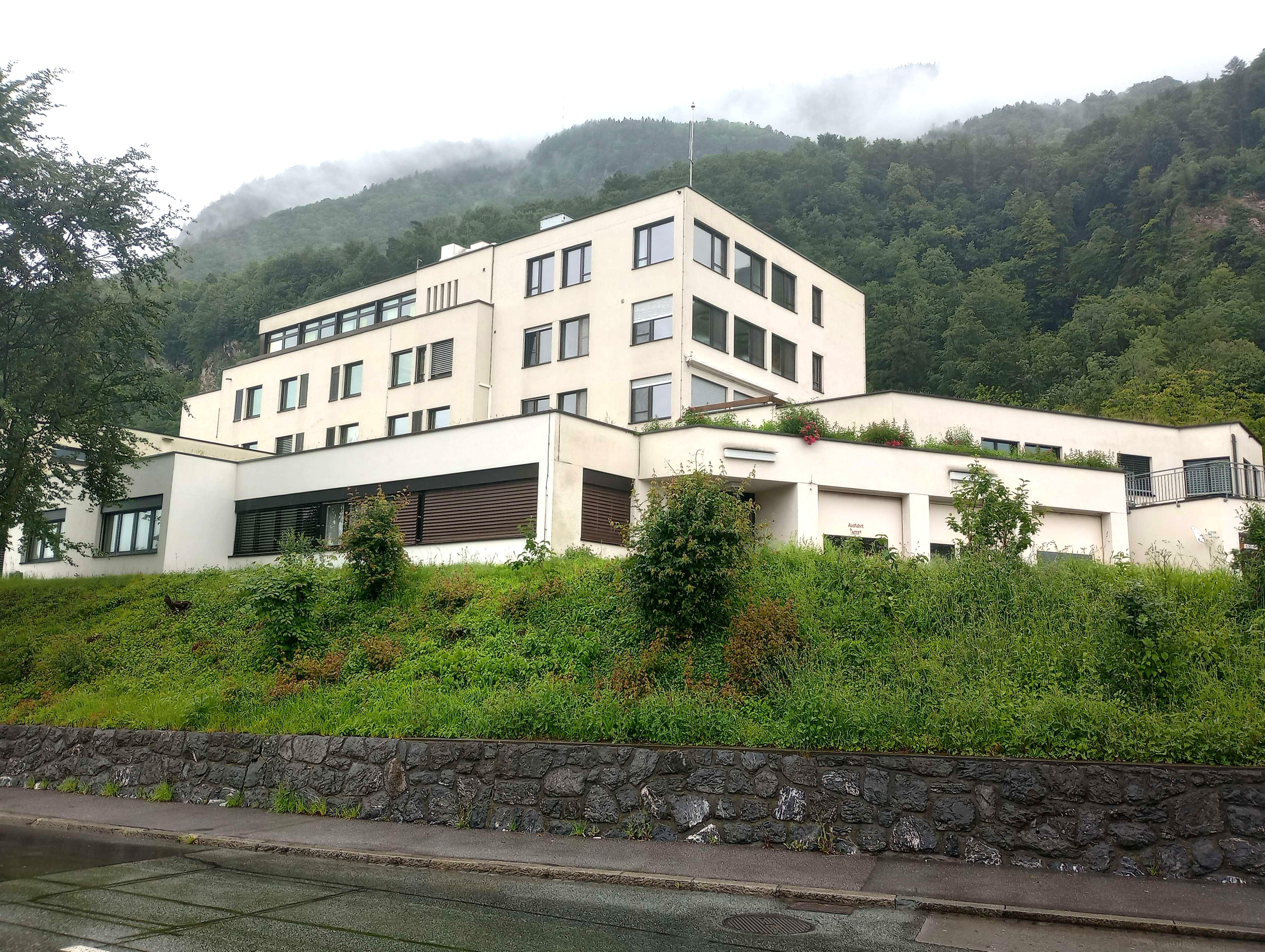
Landesspital Liechtenstein in Vaduz

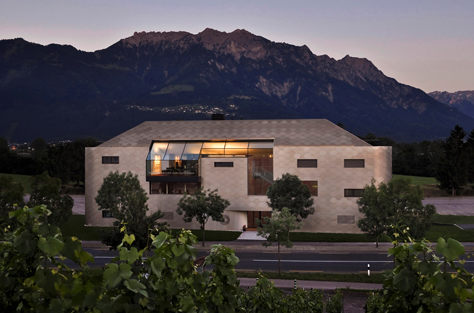
Medical clinic in Bendern, Liechtenstein

The nation of Liechtenstein has a universal health care system with decentralized, free market elements through mandated health insurance coverage for every person residing in the country (not necessarily just every citizen).

== Overview ==
Broadly speaking, individuals shop around for their own private health insurance plan, known by the abbreviation 'OKP', with government registered and regulated companies. Various supplementary services with varying private contribution rates exist for those with special healthcare needs.

The basic plans cover specialist treatments from neighboring nations such as Switzerland and Austria, though patients share some costs. Regular health check-ups with general practitioners are covered completely, with no out-of-pocket expenses.

All permanent residents of Liechtenstein must contribute to the national healthcare fund, and employers must register their staff with the health insurance fund. Employees and employers pay into the healthcare fund. Dependent family members are covered by the contributions paid by employed family members. The unemployed, old age pensioners and people on long-term sickness benefit or maternity leave do not have to pay healthcare contributions. Self-employed persons must make their own contributions. The national healthcare fund covers most medical services including treatment by specialists, hospitalisation, prescriptions, pregnancy and childbirth and rehabilitation.

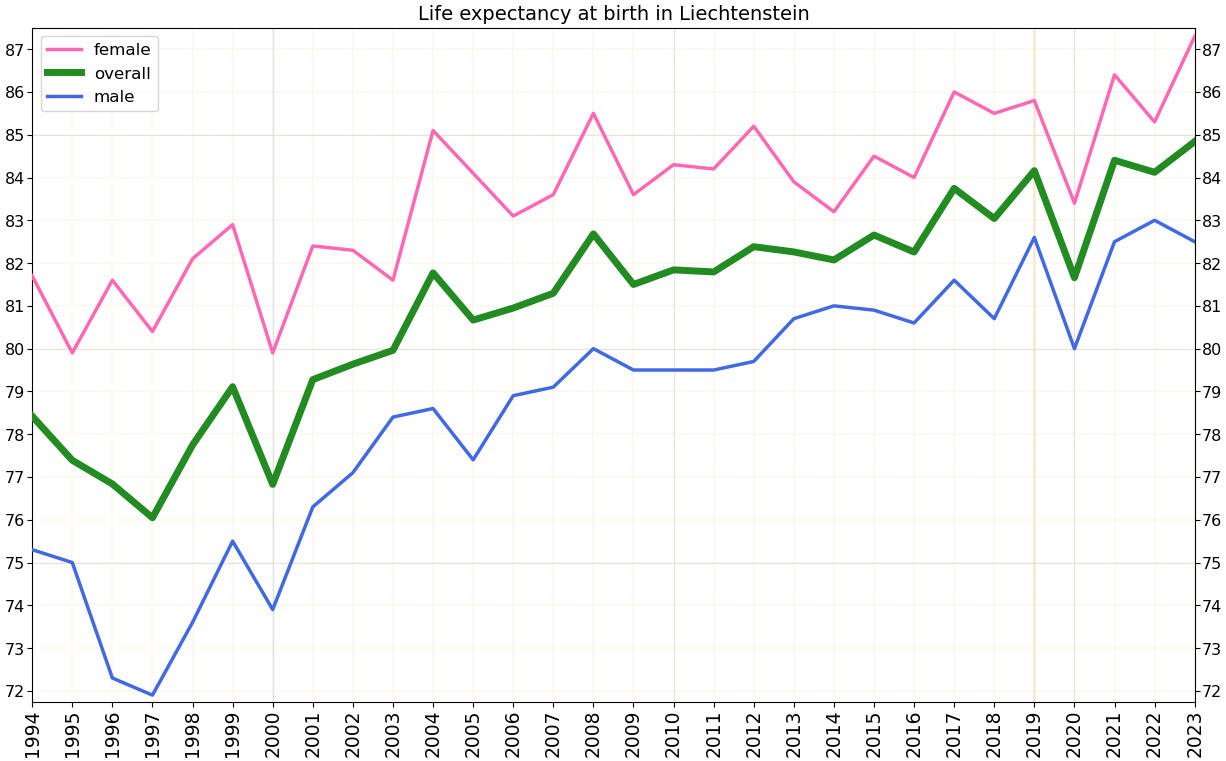
Life expectancy at birth in Liechtenstein

There are around 64 general practitioners and consultants in Liechtenstein, though they are very competent and well-trained. General practitioners (GPs) prescribe drugs, treat acute and chronic illnesses, and provide preventive care and health education. Consultants are senior doctors who have completed a higher level of training, and tend to specialize in one field, such as gynecology, oncology, pediatrics, and dermatology. GPs must refer a patient to a consultant.

Liechtenstein has one hospital, the National Hospital, situated in the capital, Vaduz, which is run in conjunction with private doctors specializing in internal medicine, surgery, gynecology, obstetrics, and psychiatry. Emergency care at the hospital is free and available even to people who are not insured. There are numerous health centers throughout the country which only provide outpatient care, but offer a wide variety of specialist services, such as general practice, maternity care, pediatrics, and dental care, as well as laboratory, radiology, and other diagnostic services. They can also provide emergency medical aid. Outside Vaduz, every town has an emergency service operated by GPs and specialists, and doctors trained in emergency medicine travel with the ambulance service. Pharmacies are located throughout the country, and a pharmacist is on call at all times.

For serious illnesses or complicated bone fractures, patients are transferred to specialized hospitals in Switzerland and Austria.

There are private clinics staffed and managed by independent doctors and specialists operating in Liechtenstein. There are also about 26 dentists in the country, and all dental care is private and must be paid for.

Abortion in Liechtenstein is illegal in most circumstances, except where the life of the pregnant woman is at risk, or the pregnancy has resulted from a sexual offence. Outside of these exceptions, abortion in the country is punishable by prison terms for the woman and the physician. An attempt to legalize it in 2011 was defeated by voters. In April and November 2012, the Landtag failed to advance proposals to relax abortion laws. Women in Liechtenstein who choose to have an abortions must cross the border to either Switzerland or Austria to have the procedure carried out legally.

== See also ==
- Liechtenstein Red Cross
- Liechtenstein health insurance referendum, 1999
- Economy of Liechtenstein
- Healthcare in Europe
- Healthcare in Switzerland
