= Dominique Hasler =

Liechtensteiner politician (born 1978)

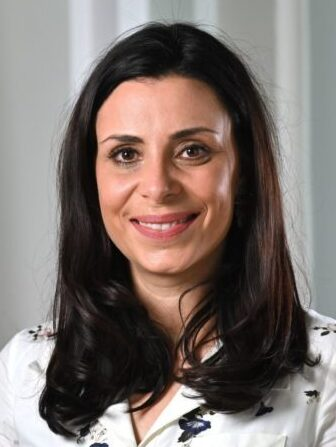
- Official portrait, 2021

Minister of Foreign Affairs, Education, and Sport
- In office 25 March 2021 – 10 April 2025
- Monarchs: Hans-Adam II; Alois (regent)
- Prime Minister: Daniel Risch
- Deputy: Violanda Lanter
- Preceded by: Katrin Eggenberger
- Succeeded by: Sabine Monauni

President of the Committee of Ministers of the Council of Europe
- In office 15 November 2023 – 19 May 2024
- Preceded by: Krišjānis Kariņš
- Succeeded by: Gabrielius Landsbergis

Minister of the Interior, Education and Environment
- In office 30 March 2017 – 25 March 2021
- Monarchs: Hans-Adam II; Alois (regent)
- Prime Minister: Adrian Hasler
- Deputy: Dietmar Lampert
- Preceded by: Thomas Zwiefelhofer
- Succeeded by: Sabine Monauni

Personal details
- Born: Dominique Matt; 6 October 1978 (age 48) Mauren, Liechtenstein
- Party: Patriotic Union
- Spouse: Daniel Hasler (m. 2018)

Dominique Hasler (née Matt, formerly Gantenbein; born 6 October 1978) is a Liechtensteiner politician who served as a government councillor for Foreign Affairs, Education and Sport from 2021 to 2025. She was also the President of the Committee of Ministers of the Council of Europe from 2023 to 2024. She previously served as a government councillor for the Interior, Education and Environment from 2017 to 2021.

== Early life and education ==
Hasler was born as Dominique Matt on 6 October 1978 in Mauren as the daughter of teacher Peter Gantenbein and Monika Matt as one of three children. Her parents divorced and she subsequently took the family name of Gantenbein. She attended cantonal school in Sargans and obtained a primary school teacher diploma in 2000.

From 2003 to 2006 she studied at the Intercantonal University of Special Needs Education in Zurich. From 2013 to 2015 she studied at the University of Liechtenstein in business administration and entrepreneurial management.

== Career ==
From 2000 to 2008 she worked as a special needs teacher in Wartau and Schaan. From 2008 to 2010 she was a member of the board of directors and head of the special education school in Schaan. From 2000 to 2017 she was a manager at the Liechtenstein Old Age and Nursing Care, and also ran a nursing home in Eschen until December 2016.

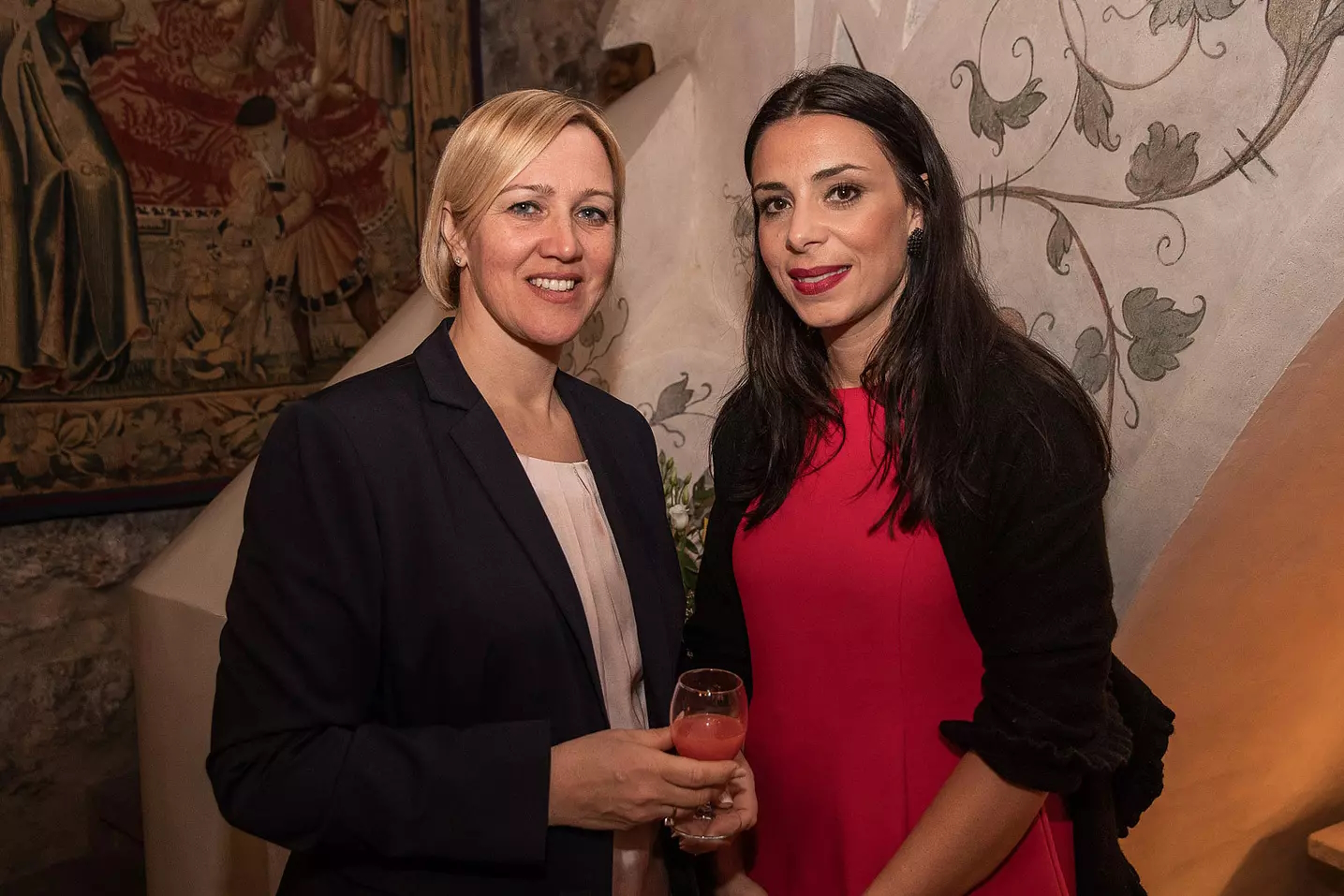
Hasler (right) with Gunilla Marxer-Kranz in 2019

Gantenbein was nominated as a government candidate by the Patriotic Union on 17 June 2016. As part of the coalition agreement established between the party and the Progressive Citizens' Party following the 2017 Liechtenstein general election, she was appointed as a government councillor for the Interior, Education and Environment on 30 March 2017. As education minister, Hasler was faced with the challenge the COVID-19 pandemic in Liechtenstein. Due to school closures as a result of the pandemic, she pioneered the transformation of Liechtenstein's education to a digital platform.

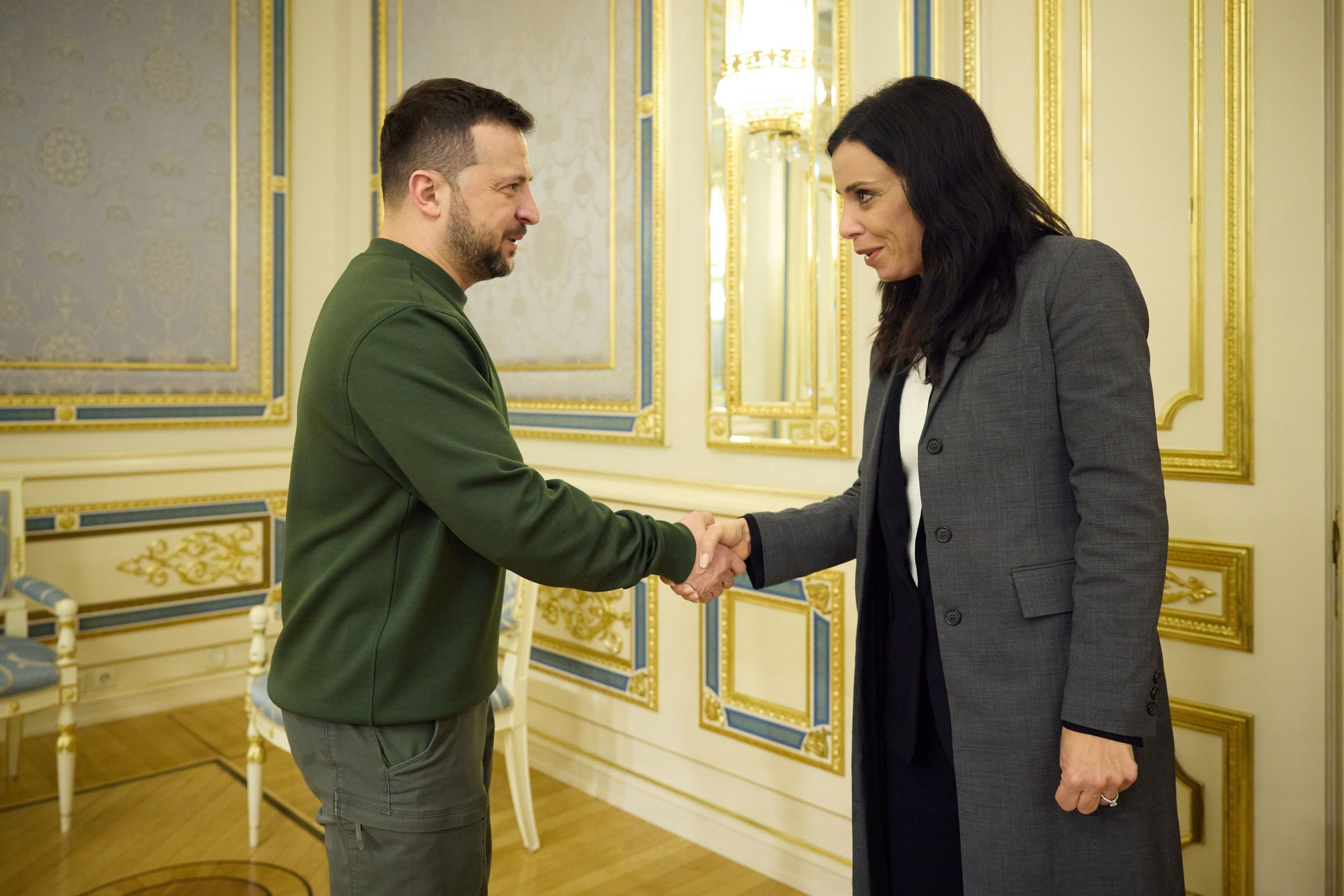
Hasler meeting Volodymyr Zelensky in Kyiv in March 2024

Hasler was re-nominated a government candidate on 10 September 2020. Following the 2021 Liechtenstein general election, she was appointed as a government councillor for Foreign Affairs, Education and Sport under a new coalition agreement on 25 March 2021.

She was the President of the Committee of Ministers of the Council of Europe from 15 November 2023 to 17 May 2024. During this time, the Council of Europe passed the Artificial Intelligence Act. Hasler, together with Daniel Risch, started the government-funded Book of Europe project in spring 2024, during Liechtenstein's presidency of the Council of Europe. In the book, the heads of government of the 46 members of the council were asked to write their thoughts and vision of Europe, which 33 did so. The book was published in February 2025.

In February 2024, she announced that she was not seeking re-election in the 2025 Liechtenstein general election. She was succeeded on 10 April 2025.

== Personal life ==
She married Daniel Hasler (born 18 May 1974) on 12 October 2018. As a result, she took his family name of Hasler. She lives in Mauren.

== Honours ==
- Austria: Grand Decoration of Honour in Gold for Services to the Republic of Austria (2025)
- Liechtenstein: Commander's Cross of the Order of Merit of the Principality of Liechtenstein (2026)
