= Liechtensteinischen Wochenzeitung =

Newspaper in Liechtenstein from 1873 to 1877

- Editor: Rudolf Schädler
- Founded: 24 January 1873; 153 years ago
- Ceased publication: 28 December 1877; 148 years ago
- Language: German
- Country: Liechtenstein

Liechtensteinischen Wochenzeitung (lit. 'Liechtenstein Weekly Newspapers') was a newspaper published in Liechtenstein from 1873 to 1877. It was the second newspaper in the country, behind the Liechtensteinischen Landeszeitung, and was the only one throughout its publication.

== History ==
The newspaper was founded by Landtag of Liechtenstein member Rudolf Schädler as its editor, and it was first published on 24 January 1873. The newspaper was intended to facilitate public opinion and holding the government accountable. It was financially supported by the Landtag and was considered Liechtenstein's official newspaper during its publication.

The newspaper published its last issue on 28 December 1877 and ceased publication shortly afterwards. This was made necessary as there was no successor for Schädler as editor.

== See also ==
- List of newspapers in Liechtenstein
