= Günter Vogt =

Liechtenstein politician (born 1961)

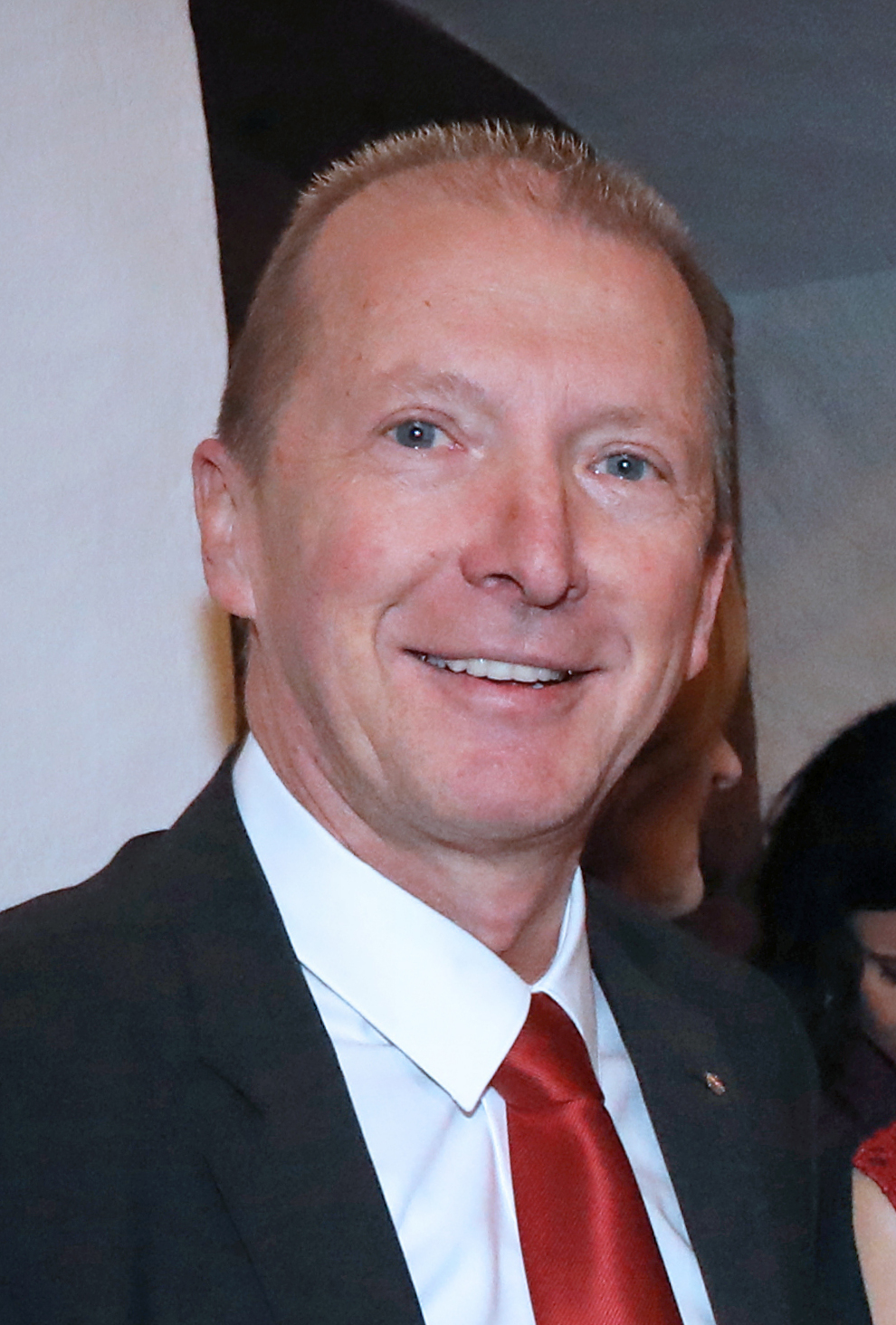
- Vogt in 2024

Member of the Landtag of Liechtenstein for Oberland
- In office 5 February 2017 – 9 February 2025

Personal details
- Born: 17 August 1961 (age 64) Chur, Switzerland
- Party: Patriotic Union
- Spouse: Manuela Hoch (m. 1991)
- Relations: Heinz Vogt (brother)
- Children: 2

Günter Vogt (born 17 August 1961) is a politician from Liechtenstein who served in the Landtag of Liechtenstein from 2017 to 2025. A member of the Patriotic Union (VU), he served as the party's spokeswoman in the Landtag from 2018 to 2020.

== Career ==
Vogt was born on 17 August 1961 in Chur as the son of Adolf Vogt and Bernadette (née Schwarz) as one of four children, including Heinz Vogt. He attended primary school in Balzers, and then secondary school in Vaduz. From 1977 to 1981 he conducted a toolmaker apprenticeship at Hoval AG in Vaduz. He studied mechanical engineering in Vaduz, where he graduated with a diploma in 1990.

From 1981 to 1991 he worked in various jobs as a toolmaker and project engineer at Balzers AG, and also at Timeler Engineering in Greenacre, New South Wales from 1982 to 1984. From 1991 to 2012 he was the managing director and chairman of the board of directors at ITW Ingenieurunternehmung AG in Balzers. From 2014 to 2020 he was the managing director and chairman of the board of directors at ACT Anzeige- & Informationstechnik AG in Maienfeld. From 2020 to 2023, he was a project manager of the Entry/Exit System at the Liechtenstein immigration office in Vaduz.

From 1995 to 2000 Vogt was president of the Liechtenstein IT office and automation section, and from 2000 to 2002 he was a member of the UEAPME. From 2011 to 2015 he was a municipal councillor in Balzers as a member of the Patriotic Union (VU). From 2017 to 2025 he was a member of the Landtag of Liechtenstein. During this time, From 2017 to 2021 he was head of the Liechtenstein delegation to the Organization for Security and Co-operation in Europe from 2017 to 2021, and then he was the head of the Liechtenstein delegation to the European Free Trade Association and European Economic Area from 2021 to 2025.

Vogt was the VU's spokesman in the Landtag from 2018 to 2020. He resigned from this position due to professional reasons and was succeeded by Manfred Kaufmann. Vogt ran for mayor of Balzers in 2019, but was defeated by incumbent mayor Hansjörg Büchel.

Vogt married Manuela Hoch on 8 May 1991 and they have two children together. He lives in Balzers. His brother Heinz Vogt also served in the Landtag.
