= Patrick Risch =

Liechtenstein politician (born 1968)

Member of the Landtag of Liechtenstein for Unterland
- In office 5 February 2017 – 9 February 2025

Personal details
- Born: 27 September 1968 (age 57) Eschen, Liechtenstein
- Party: Free List

Patrick Risch (born 27 September 1968) is a politician from Liechtenstein who served in the Landtag of Liechtenstein from 2017 to 2025. A member of the Free List, he served as the party's spokesman in the Landtag from 2021 to 2025.

== Life ==
Risch was born on 27 September 1968 in Eschen as the son of Quido Risch and Rita (née Kobler). He conducted an apprenticeship as a pastry chef and trained in European Union and Swiss food law and cyber security. Since 2002, he has worked as a self-employed IT specialist. In 2002, he was a co-founder of Miratools AG in Schellenberg and since 2013 owner of Standpunkte GmbH in Schellenberg.

Risch was a member of the Schellenberg municipal council from 2011 to 2023 as a member of the Free List. He was a deputy member of the Landtag of Liechtenstein from 2013 to 2017, and a full member from 2017 to 2025. From 2015 to 2017 and again from 2021 to 2025 he was a member of the Landtag's finance committee, and from 2017 to 2021 he was a member of the Liechtenstein commission to the European Economic Area; he was the Free List's spokesman in the Landtag from 2021 to 2025. Risch unsuccessfully ran for mayor of Schellenberg in 2023. He has again been a deputy member of the Landtag since 2025.

Risch has been a prominent supporter of LGBTQ rights in Liechtenstein and was a supporter of the 2011 partnership act, which came into effect in 1 September. He was a founding member of the FLay - Gays and Lesbians Liechtenstein and Rhine Valley in 1998 and its president until 2008.
