= Lie:zeit =

Monthly newspaper published in Liechtenstein

- Owner: Zeit-Verlag Anstalt
- Editor: Herbert Oehri; Johannes Kaiser
- Founded: April 2011; 15 years ago
- Language: German
- City: Eschen
- Country: Liechtenstein
- Circulation: 8,400 (as of 2023)
- Website: www.lie-zeit.li

Lie:zeit is a monthly newspaper published in Liechtenstein.

== History ==
The newspaper originates from Zeit-Verlag Anstalt in Eschen, founded in 2008 by Herbert Oehri and Johannes Kaiser, which published a sports magazine sport:zeit. In April 2011, it was expanded and the Lie:zeit was published for the first with Oehri and Kaiser as editors. It has been published every Sunday since 2013 and covers social, political, economic, cultural and traffic topics.

It has been described as being close to the Progressive Citizens' Party. However, a survey conducted in 2024 suggested that a majority of respondents thought that the newspaper was generally politically neutral. The newspaper is free and is circulated to every household in Liechtenstein, with funding primarily coming from advertisements and government funding. As of 2023, it had a regular circulation of approximately 8,400.

== See also ==
- List of newspapers in Liechtenstein
