= Heinz Vogt =

Liechtenstein politician (born 1968)

Member of the Landtag of Liechtenstein for Oberland
- In office 13 March 2005 – 8 February 2009

Personal details
- Born: 6 April 1968 (age 57) Grabs, Switzerland
- Party: Patriotic Union
- Spouse: Elke Breitenbaumer (m. 1992)
- Relations: Günter Vogt (brother)
- Children: 2

Heinz Vogt (born 6 April 1968) is an accountant and politician from Liechtenstein who served in the Landtag of Liechtenstein from 2005 to 2009.

== Life ==
Vogt was born on 6 April 1968 in Grabs as the son of plumber Adolf Vogt and Bernadette (née Schwarz) as one of four children. He conducted a commercial apprenticeship in the state administration of Liechtenstein; he became a certified accountant and an auditor in 1992 and 1994 respectively. He worked at VP Bank from 1988 to 1992 and since has been the managing director of a fiduciary company. He has been the treasurer of the Liechtenstein fishing association since 2002.

He was a member of the Landtag of Liechtenstein from 2005 to 2009 as a member of the Patriotic Union (VU); during this time, he was the chairman of the business audit committee and a member of the state committee. He did not seek re-election in the 2009 elections. As of 2025, Vogt is the chairman of the board of directors of Malbun Mountain Railways AG.

Vogt married Elke Breitenbaumer on 12 September 1992 and they have two children together. He is from Balzers, but lives in Triesen. His brother Günter Vogt also served in the Landtag.
