= 2005 Liechtenstein constitutional referendum =

Referendum on abortion

27 November 2005

"For Life" proposal
For	18.75%
Against	81.25%

Landtag counterproposal
For	79.65%
Against	20.35%
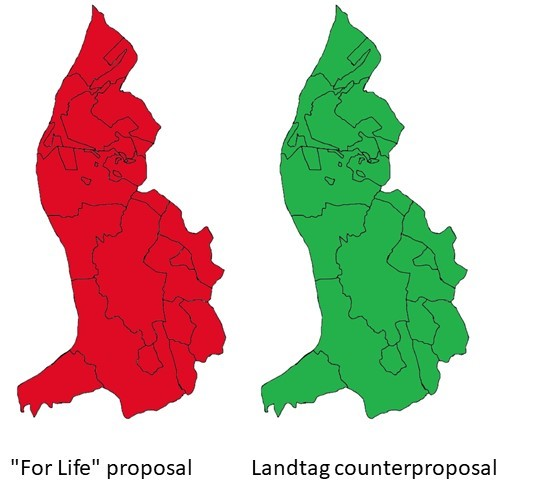
- Results by municipality

A constitutional referendum on the subject of abortion law was held in Liechtenstein on 27 November 2005. Voters were presented with a "For Life" proposal and a counterproposal by the Landtag. For the first time since 1925, a Landtag counterproposal was approved in a referendum, whilst the "For Life" initiative was rejected.

== Background ==
The "For Life" proposal was a citizen initiative, which called for a change to Article 14 of the constitution, with the aim of banning abortion. The article text would be changed from "The supreme task of the state is to promote the overall welfare of the People." to "The supreme task of the state is the protection of human life from conception to natural death and to promote the overall welfare of the People." The initiative collected 1,891 signatures between 24 June and 5 August 2005, of which 1,889 were ruled valid, exceeding the threshold of 1,500 required for an initiative to be considered by the Landtag.

The Landtag voted on the proposal on 21 September, rejecting it by 23 to 2 votes. A counter-proposal developed by the Landtag was approved by 23–2. It involved adding two new sections to Article 27 of the constitution:

Article 27bis (human dignity)
1. The dignity of man is to be respected and protected.
2. No one shall be subjected to inhuman or degrading treatment or punishment.

Article 27ter (right to life)
1. Everyone has the right to life.
2. The death penalty is prohibited.

As the proposal involved a constitutional amendment, a second reading was required. This was held on 28 September, when it was again passed by 23 votes to two. The government then set the date for the referendum.

== Results ==
Question	For		Against		Invalid/ blank	Total votes	Registered voters	Turnout	Outcome
Question	Votes	%	Votes	%	Invalid/ blank	Total votes	Registered voters	Turnout	Outcome
"For Life" proposal	1,909	18.75	8,274	81.25	1,152	11,335	17,570	64.51	Rejected
Landtag counterproposal	8,460	79.65	2,162	20.35	713	11,335	17,570	64.51	Approved
Source: Nohlen & Stöver, Government of Liechtenstein
