= List of newspapers in Liechtenstein =

Below is a list of newspapers published in Liechtenstein:

== Current ==
- Liechtensteiner Vaterland (founded 1936)
- Liewo Sonntagszeitung (founded 1993)
- Wirtschaft Regional (founded 2001)
- Lie:zeit (founded 2011)
- Hoi du (founded 2013)

== Former ==
- Liechtensteinischen Landeszeitung (1863–1868)
- Liechtensteinischen Wochenzeitung (1873–1877)
- Liechtensteiner Volksblatt (1878–2023)
- Liechtensteiner Nachrichten (1914–1936)
- Liechtensteinische Freiwirtschaftliche Zeitung (1932–1933)
- Der Umbruch (1940–1943)
- Der Liechtensteiner (1964–1976)
