= Wendelin Lampert =

Liechtenstein politician (born 1970)

Member of the Landtag of Liechtenstein for Oberland
- In office 11 February 2001 – 9 February 2025

Personal details
- Born: 21 April 1970 (age 55) Triesenberg, Liechtenstein
- Party: Progressive Citizens' Party
- Spouse: Sandra Beck (m. 2008)
- Children: 2

Wendelin Lampert (born 21 April 1970) is a politician from Liechtenstein who served in the Landtag of Liechtenstein from 2001 to 2025.

== Life ==
Lampert was born on 21 April 1970 in Triesenberg as the son of mechanic Hans Lampert and Rosmarie (née Sele) as one of three children. He attended secondary school in Vaduz, and then vocational secondary school in St. Gallen. From 1987 to 1991 he conducted an apprenticeship as a plumber in Vaduz. From 1992 to 1995 he studied building technologies, specifically in the area of heating, ventilation and air conditioning in Lucerne, where he graduated with a diploma.

He has worked as a plumbing engineer at various locations in Liechtenstein and Switzerland. Since 1998, Lampert has been the head of the Public Procurement Department in the Liechtenstein National Administration.

From 2001 to 2025, he was a member of the Landtag of Liechtenstein and a member of the finance committee. During this time, among other things, he has advocated for the introduction of photovoltaic systems on all government-owned buildings in 2021 and a ban on oil and gas heating on new buildings following the start of the Russian invasion of Ukraine in 2022. In 2024 he, alongside Johannes Kaiser, submitted a proposal aimed at increasing care and nursing home allowances. In 2023, the newspaper Liechtensteiner Vaterland referred to Lampert as the "most talkative person in the state parliament". He did not seek re-election to the Landtag in 2025.

In 2024, Lampert was a leading proponent for Liechtenstein's accession to the International Monetary Fund (IMF); he campaigned in favour of it. He described Liechtenstein's accession to the IMF as a commitment to "realpolitik". The subsequent referendum in September was accepted by voters, and Liechtenstein joined the IMF the following month.

Lampert married Sandra Beck on 26 September 2008 and they have two children together.

== Electoral history ==
| Year | Constituency | Votes | Result |
|---|---|---|---|
| 2001 | Oberland | 4154 | Elected |
| 2005 | Oberland | 4307 | Elected |
| 2009 | Oberland | 3925 | Elected |
| 2013 | Oberland | 3657 | Elected |
| 2017 | Oberland | 3699 | Elected |
| 2021 | Oberland | 3552 | Elected |
Source: Lantagwahlen
