= LGBTQ rights in Liechtenstein =

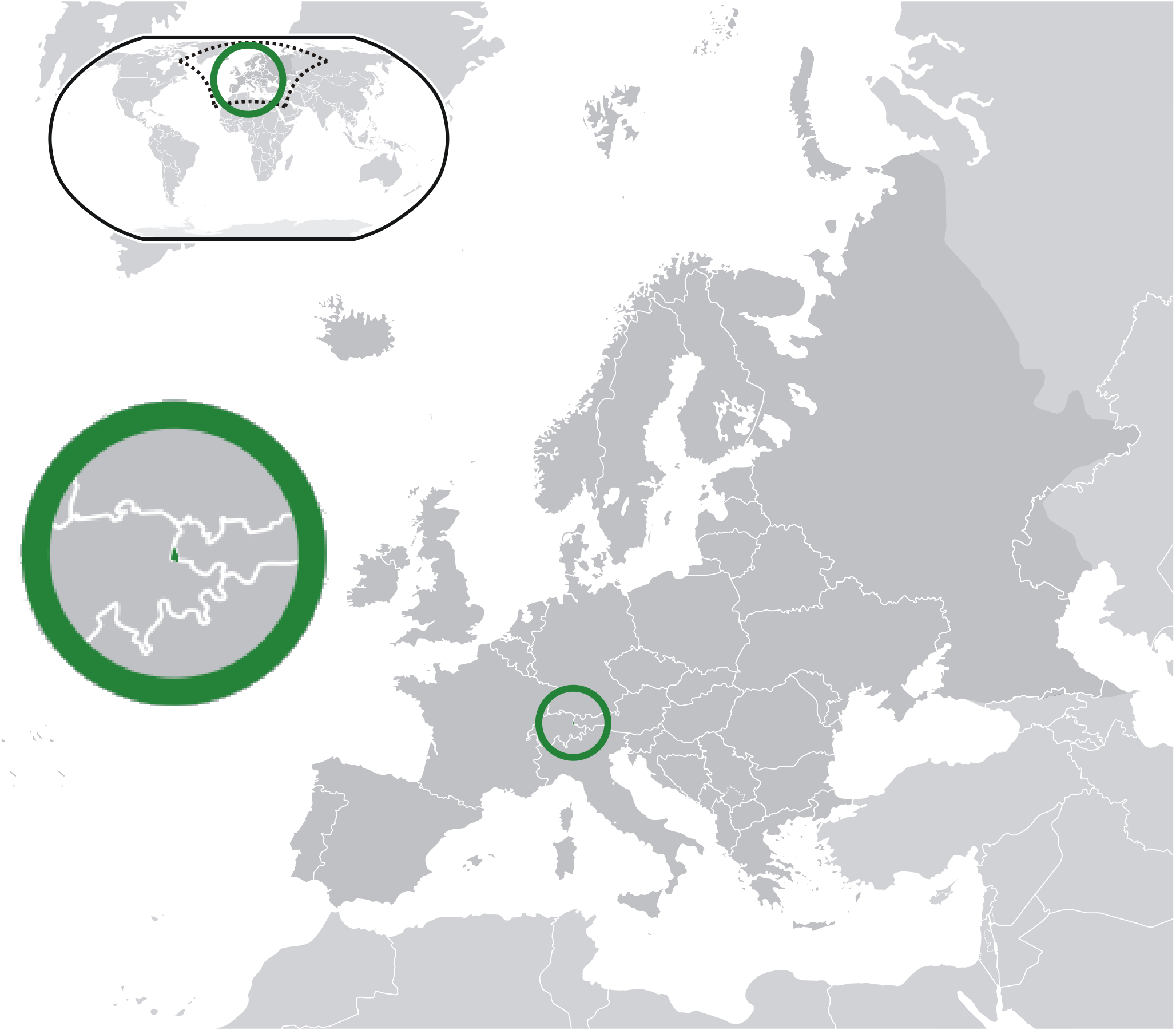
- Location of Liechtenstein (green) in Europe (dark grey) – [Legend]
- Legal status: Legal since 1989, equal age of consent since 2001.
- Military: Not applicable (country has no army)
- Discrimination protections: Sexual orientation protections since 2016

Family rights
- Recognition of relationships: Registered partnerships since 2011; Same-sex marriage since 2025
- Adoption: Full adoption rights since 2023

The rights of lesbian, gay, bisexual, transgender, and queer (LGBTQ) people in Liechtenstein have developed significantly over time. Same-sex sexual activity has been legal since 1989, with an equal age of consent since 2001. Same-sex couples have had access to registered partnerships since 2011, and discrimination on the basis of sexual orientation has been outlawed in some areas since 2016.

On 8 March 2024, the Liechtenstein government passed a bill by a vote of 24-1 regarding same-sex marriage rights on its first reading; the legislation went into effect on 1 January 2025. The second/final reading took place on 16 May 2024, on the bill, and the parliament again voted in favor of the same-sex marriage, with 24 of the 25 MPs supporting it.

== Law regarding same-sex sexual activity ==
Same-sex sexual activity was legalized in 1989 by the removal of Sections 129 and 130 of the Criminal Code, though the age of consent was not equalized until 2001. The Penal Code was revised in December 2000 to remove all discrimination against same-sex sexual activity, taking effect in 2001. The age of consent is 14, regardless of gender and sexual orientation.

== Recognition of same-sex marriage ==
In 2001, the Free List, one of the three political parties in the country, began working on a draft for a same-sex partnership law. The paper was accepted by the Landtag and given to the Liechtenstein Government. The proposed registered partnership bill was rejected by the Parliament in summer 2003. A new proposal by the Free List was adopted by the Landtag with a majority of 19 votes to 6 on 24 October 2007. Justice Minister Aurelia Frick presented the draft of the registered partnership bill in April 2010. On 23 November, the government approved the final version of the bill. On 16 December 2010, it was approved by the Landtag in the first reading. It passed its second reading on 16 March and was published on 21 March 2011. A group Vox Populi announced its intention to force a referendum on the matter. According to the Constitution, the organization had 30 days to collect at least 1,000 signatures. A referendum was held on 17 and 19 June 2011 and 68.8% of voters approved the law, which then went into effect on 1 September 2011.

According to a report approved by the Liechtenstein government in October 2022, the current partnership law uses "gender-equitable formulations" in its general clauses and legal definitions, implying that both same-sex and opposite-sex couples can enter into registered partnerships under the current law. (Note: Read Section 4.2 (pages 16 (bottom) through 17 (top)) of the provided reference link for details.)

Since 1 January 2017, registered partners have been allowed to have a common "name" as equivalent to a "family name" for married couples.

In 2018, a gay couple filed suit in court, arguing that the same-sex marriage ban is in violation of the European Convention on Human Rights and the Constitution of Liechtenstein. Although a court of first instance initially ruled for the couple, the State Court (StGH) ruled in September 2019 that banning same-sex marriage is not unconstitutional. However, the court concluded that several provisions of the 2011 partnership law were discriminatory, notably its provisions prohibiting civil partners from adopting their stepchildren (so-called stepchild adoption).

On 21 September 2022, a motion calling on the government to introduce a bill legalizing same-sex marriage was submitted to the Landtag by 15 out of the 25 sitting members. (Note: The 15 members were Dagmar Bühler-Nigsch (VU), Albert Frick (FBP), Sebastian Gassner (FBP), Manuela Haldner-Schierscher (FL), Norma Heidegger (VU), Franziska Hoop (FBP), Johannes Kaiser (FBP), Georg Kaufmann (FL), Wendelin Lampert (FBP), Daniel Oehry (FBP), Bettina Petzold-Mähr (FBP), Sascha Quaderer (FBP), Patrick Risch (FL), Daniel Seger (FBP), and Karin Zech-Hoop (FBP), representing all members of the FBP (10) and the FL (3), along with 2 members of the VU.) The motion was discussed in the plenary session on 2 November 2022, and was passed by a 23–2 vote.

On 11 July 2023, the government adopted a consultation report regarding proposed changes to three existing laws as part of the motion's implementation: the Marriage Act, the Partnership Act, and the Personal and Company Act. A consultation period ended on 10 October 2023. In August 2023, Prime Minister Daniel Risch said that the legalization of same-sex marriage "should be coming very soon". On 6 February 2024, the government adopted the results of the consultation report along with the proposal regarding the amendment of the three aforementioned laws. Under the proposal, no new registered partnerships would be established in Liechtenstein, although existing ones would continue to be recognised and could be converted into marriage via a simple procedure. The bill passed its first reading on 8 March 2024 with 24 votes in favor and one against.

8 March 2024 vote (1st Reading) in the Landtag
Political affiliation	Voted for	Voted against
G Patriotic Union (VU)^{a}	10: Hubert Büchel^{b}; Dagmar Bühler-Nigsch; Walter Frick; Norma Heidegger; Manfred Kaufmann; Dietmar Lampert; Gunilla Marxer-Kranz; Günter Vogt; Thomas Vogt; Mario Wohlwend	-
G Progressive Citizens' Party (FBP)^{a}	10: Albert Frick (President of the Landtag); Sebastian Gassner; Franziska Hoop; Johannes Kaiser; Wendelin Lampert; Daniel Oehry; Bettina Petzold-Mähr; Sascha Quaderer; Daniel Seger; Karin Zech-Hoop	-
Free List (FL)	3: Manuela Haldner-Schierscher; Georg Kaufmann; Patrick Risch	-
Democrats for Liechtenstein (DpL)	1: Thomas Rehak	1: Herbert Elkuch
Total	24	1

a. Part of the VU-FBP Coalition under Prime Minister Daniel Risch.
b. Served as a substitute deputy for Peter Frick throughout the plenary legislative session.

A final vote on the legislation took place on 16 May, where the bill passed 24–1. Prior to the scheduling of the final vote, it was decided that no changes would be made towards the proposed legislation and that no referendum would be taken against it by the state parliament. The legislation received royal assent on 9 July 2024 and took effect on 1 January 2025.

== Adoption and parenting ==
On 1 January 2016, during his annual New Year's Day interview, Prince Hans-Adam II announced his opposition to allowing same-sex couples to adopt children.

In September 2019, the State Court ordered the Liechtenstein Government to look into the legalisation of stepchild adoption for civil partners. On 15 June 2021, the State Court of Liechtenstein ruled that registered partners should have the right to adopt, and invalidated the sections of the 2011 partnership law which had forbidden such adoptions. It gave Parliament one year to rectify the issue. Following the court decision, the government drafted a bill granting same-sex couples the right to adopt their stepchildren (i.e. stepchild adoption), which was passed on 6 May 2022. On that same day, Parliament narrowly rejected an amendment that would have excluded same-sex couples from joint adoption and procedures for reproductive medicine for those in registered partnerships.

After a consultation period lasting from 6 July to 30 September 2022, the government passed a motion on full adoption equality for same-sex couples on 31 October 2022. The proposal was discussed in its 1st reading in the Landtag on 2 December 2022 and was passed in a 22 to 3 vote.

2 December 2022 vote in the Landtag
Political affiliation	Voted for	Voted against
G Patriotic Union (VU)^{a}	7: Dagmar Bühler-Nigsch; Peter Frick; Norma Heidegger; Manfred Kaufmann; Gunilla Marxer-Kranz; Thomas Vogt; Mario Wohlwend	3: Walter Frick; Dietmar Lampert; Günter Vogt
G Progressive Citizens' Party (FBP)^{a}	10: Albert Frick (President of the Landtag); Sebastian Gassner; Franziska Hoop; Johannes Kaiser; Elke Kindle^{b}; Wendelin Lampert; Daniel Oehry; Sascha Quaderer; Daniel Seger; Karin Zech-Hoop	-
Free List (FL)	3: Manuela Haldner-Schierscher; Georg Kaufmann; Patrick Risch	-
Democrats for Liechtenstein (DpL)	2: Herbert Elkuch; Thomas Rehak	-
Total	22	3

a. Part of the VU-FBP Coalition under Prime Minister Daniel Risch.
b. Served as a substitute deputy for Bettina Petzold-Mähr around the time of the debate & vote.

On 2 March 2023, the proposal was discussed and passed in its 2nd reading. A motion to have the proposed legislation go into effect at an earlier date was defeated with only 8 votes in favor. The legislation was issued in the National Legal Gazette (Liechtensteinisches Landesgesetzblatt) on 25 April 2023 and went into effect on 1 June 2023.

2 March 2023 vote in the Landtag
Political affiliation	Voted for	Voted against
G Patriotic Union (VU)^{a}	6 - 7^{b}: Dagmar Bühler-Nigsch; Peter Frick; Norma Heidegger; Manfred Kaufmann; Gunilla Marxer-Kranz; Thomas Vogt	3 - 4^{b}: Hubert Büchel^{c}; Walter Frick; Günter Vogt
G Progressive Citizens' Party (FBP)^{a}	10: Albert Frick (President of the Landtag); Franziska Hoop; Johannes Kaiser; Elke Kindle^{d}; Wendelin Lampert; Daniel Oehry; Bettina Petzold-Mähr; Daniel Seger; Nadine Vogelsang^{d}; Karin Zech-Hoop	-
Free List (FL)	3: Manuela Haldner-Schierscher; Georg Kaufmann; Patrick Risch	-
Democrats for Liechtenstein (DpL)	2: Herbert Elkuch; Thomas Rehak	-
Total	21 - 22	3 - 4

a. Part of the VU-FBP Coalition under Prime Minister Daniel Risch.
b. In separate votes, Patriotic Union MP Mario Wohlwend voted in favor of the "Amendment of the Partnership Law", but against the "Amendment of the General Civil Code".
c. Served as a substitute deputy for Dietmar Lampert around the time of the debate & vote.
d. Served as substitute deputies for Sebastian Gassner & Sascha Quaderer around the time of the debate & vote.

== Discrimination protections ==
On 22 February 2005, following a department reorganisation, the Department of Equal Opportunities (German: Stabsstelle für Chancengleichheit) was assigned to include discrimination on sexual orientation in its area of responsibility.

The Act on Media (German: Mediengesetz), enacted in October 2005, declares that media content will be considered illegal if it incites or supports discrimination based on racial or ethnic origin, gender, religion, age, disability or sexual orientation.

Since 1 April 2016, harassment and incitement to hatred on the basis of sexual orientation has been banned in Liechtenstein, punishable by up to two years' imprisonment. Section 283(1) of the Penal Code states:

- (German): Mit Freiheitsstrafe bis zu zwei Jahren ist zu bestrafen, wer öffentlich gegen eine Person oder eine Gruppe von Personen wegen ihrer Rasse, Sprache, Nationalität, Ethnie, Religion oder Weltanschauung, ihres Geschlechts, ihrer Behinderung, ihres Alters oder ihrer sexuellen Ausrichtung zu Hass oder Diskriminierung aufreizt.
- (English): Any person shall be punished with imprisonment of up to two years who publicly incites hatred or discrimination against another person or any group of persons on the grounds of their race, language, nationality, ethnic origin, religion or ideology, their gender, disability, age or sexual orientation.

Section 283(6) of the Penal Code prohibits discrimination in public facilities on the basis of, among other categories, sexual orientation.

== Blood donation ==
Liechtenstein follows the same blood donation rules as Austria, where blood donation rules have been non-discriminatory toward LGBT people since summer 2022.

== Living conditions ==
A gay and lesbian organization, Flay, was founded in 1998, and organizes social activities for LGBT people in the triangular area between Liechtenstein, Vorarlberg (Austria) and the Swiss Rhine Valley.

Privacy and individual rights are regarded as fundamental assets of Liechtensteiner society. Open and public discrimination against LGBT people is extremely rare and almost completely unheard of. Despite Liechtenstein's reputation as a conservative Catholic nation, same-sex couples and LGBT people more generally face little social differences compared to heterosexuals and are accepted and tolerated. The country is often compared to "a huge family where everyone knows each other and minds their own business with little interference from others". Due partly to the small population, there are no specific gay bars or venues.

A 2017 online poll conducted by the Liechtensteiner Vaterland found majority support for the legalisation of same-sex marriage, at 69%.

== Summary table ==
Same-sex sexual activity legal	Yes (Since 1989)
Equal age of consent (14)	Yes (Since 2001)
Anti-discrimination laws in employment	No
Anti-discrimination laws in provision of goods and services	Yes / No (Since 2016 for sexual orientation, not gender identity)
Anti-discrimination laws in other areas (hate crimes & indirect discrimination etc.)	Yes / No (Since 2016 for sexual orientation, not gender identity)
Same-sex marriage(s)	Yes (Since 2025)
Recognition of same-sex couples (e.g. registered partnership)	Yes (Since 2011)
Adoption by single LGBT person	Yes
Stepchild adoption by same-sex couples	Yes (Since 2022)
Joint adoption by same-sex couples	Yes (Since 2023)
LGBT people allowed to serve openly in the military	Has no military
Right to change legal gender	No
Conversion therapy on minors outlawed	No
Access to IVF for lesbian couples	(Proposed^{a})
Commercial surrogacy for gay male couples	No (Illegal for all couples regardless of sexual orientation)
MSMs allowed to donate blood	Yes (Since 2022)

a. (Indirectly categorized as 'reproductive medicine' & 'medically assisted medicine'): Read Sections 2 & 4.2 (pages 12 & 15 through 16 (top paragraph) respectively) of the provided reference link for details.

== See also ==
- Human rights in Liechtenstein
- LGBT rights in Europe
