= Liewo Sonntagszeitung =

Weekly newspaper published in Switzerland and Liechtenstein

Neue Liewo

- Front cover of the print edition, 13 April 2024
- Owner: Liechtensteiner Vaterland
- Founder: Hanspeter Rheinberger
- Founded: 1993; 33 years ago
- Language: German
- Country: Switzerland; Liechtenstein
- Website: www.liewo.li

Liewo Sonntagszeitung (lit. 'Liewo Sunday Newspaper'), also known as Neue Liewo (lit. 'New Liewo'), is a weekly newspaper published in Werdenberg, Switzerland and Liechtenstein. It operates as a subsidiary newspaper of the Liechtensteiner Vaterland.

== History ==
The newspaper was founded in 1993 as the Liechtensteiner Woche (lit. 'Liechtenstein Weekly') by Hanspeter Rheinberger and was published exclusively in Liechtenstein. In 1999 it was acquired by the publishing of the Liechtensteiner Vaterland and the publishing area was expanded to include Werdenberg, Switzerland.

The newspaper primarily focuses on entertainment and lifestyle topics, but on occasion additionally includes political topics.

== See also ==
- Liechtensteiner Vaterland
- List of newspapers in Liechtenstein
