= Abortion in Liechtenstein =

Abortion in Liechtenstein is illegal in most circumstances with limited exceptions in cases where the life of the pregnant woman is at risk, or serious damage to her health which cannot otherwise be prevented, or where the pregnancy has resulted from a sexual offence. Religion in Liechtenstein is mainly Roman Catholic, which is reflected in the faith of the ruling Princely House of Liechtenstein and in the country's laws and culture around pregnancy.

== Law ==
Last modified in 2015, Liechtenstein law allows any woman to obtain a physician-performed abortion. However, physicians in the country can only perform abortions under very limited circumstances (see below). Therefore, to stay within the law most women must travel abroad for the procedure. Of note, the age of consent in Liechtenstein is 14.

The Criminal Code (Strafgesetzbuch) of Liechtenstein (in section 96) states that:

1. Any person who, with the consent of the pregnant woman, terminates the pregnancy of the woman shall be punished with imprisonment of up to one year or with a monetary penalty of up to 720 daily rates [of a fine]; if such person commits the act on a commercial basis, such person shall be punished with imprisonment of up to three years.

2. If the immediate perpetrator is not a physician, then such perpetrator shall be punished with imprisonment of up to three years; if he commits the act on a commercial basis or if the act results in the death of the pregnant woman, he shall be punished with imprisonment of six months to five years.

3. A woman who terminates her pregnancy herself or allows another person, who is not a physician, to terminate her pregnancy shall be punished with imprisonment of up to one year or with a monetary penalty of up to 720 daily rates.

The above acts shall not be punishable if the termination of pregnancy is:

- necessary to avert serious danger to the life or serious damage to the health of the pregnant woman that cannot be averted otherwise (and additionally the pregnancy is terminated by a physician);
- the pregnancy is the result of a sexual offence or the pregnant woman was under-age at the time of conception (and additionally the pregnancy is terminated by a physician); or
- undertaken to save the pregnant woman from an immediate danger to life that cannot be averted otherwise, under circumstances not permitting medical assistance to be obtained in time.

Sections 97 and 98 of the Strafgesetzbuch, respectively, prohibit termination of pregnancy without the consent of the pregnant woman and grossly negligent intervention in respect of a pregnant woman, including the promotion of abortion. Liechtenstein has a high quality health service.

== Proposals ==
In a double referendum on abortion in November 2005, 81% of voters rejected a For Life proposal to prohibit all abortion – "The supreme task of the state is the protection of human life from conception to natural death and to promote the overall welfare of the People" – while 80% approved the counter-proposal from the Landtag (Parliament) to be included in the Constitution of Liechtenstein:

- The dignity of man is to be respected and protected.
- No one shall be subjected to inhuman or degrading treatment or punishment.
- Everyone has the right to life.
- The death penalty is prohibited.

A proposal to legalize abortion, in the first 12 weeks of pregnancy or when the unborn child was disabled, was defeated in a further referendum held in September 2011. The opponents, which included Prince Alois, got 500 votes more and eventually settled at 52.3 percent compared with 47.7 percent. Prince Alois had previously threatened to veto the proposal if it passed. In April and November 2012, the Landtag considered but did not advance proposals to relax abortion laws. Until an amendment of the Criminal Code in 2015, the exception for rape was limited to cases where the victim of the rape was aged under 14 years old.

A new proposal titled Fristenlösung für Liechtenstein (transl. Time-limit solution for Liechtenstein), again intended to legalize abortion before 12 weeks of pregnancy was submitted to the government in February 2026. The initiative was conducted by organizations including Women in Good Health, the Women's Network, Infra, and the Free List. In an interview with the newspaper Liechtensteiner Vaterland the same month, Prince Alois once again opposed the proposal, and in June announced that, like in 2011, he would veto any successful law or referendum. The initiative began collecting signatures in June and on 31 July the initiative was submitted with 4970 signatures, representing approximately a quarter of Liechtenstein's eligible voters. The initiative received the second-highest amount of signatures in Liechtenstein's history. In September 2026, Liechtenstein's Parliament voted to back the initiative with a narrow majority of 13 votes to 12. However, Prince Alois used his veto power for the first time, quashing the bill.

A poll conducted by Lie-Barometer in July 2026 suggested that 62% of respondents would support a time-limit solution for abortion.

== Statistics ==
Women in Liechtenstein who choose to have an abortion must cross the border, to either neighboring Switzerland or Austria, to have the procedure carried out legally or to obtain advice in relation to abortion. In 2011, it was estimated that approximately 50 women a year had abortions, either illegally in Liechtenstein or abroad in either Switzerland or Austria.

== See also ==
- Healthcare in Liechtenstein
