= Georg Kaufmann (politician) =

Liechtenstein teacher and politician (born 1955)

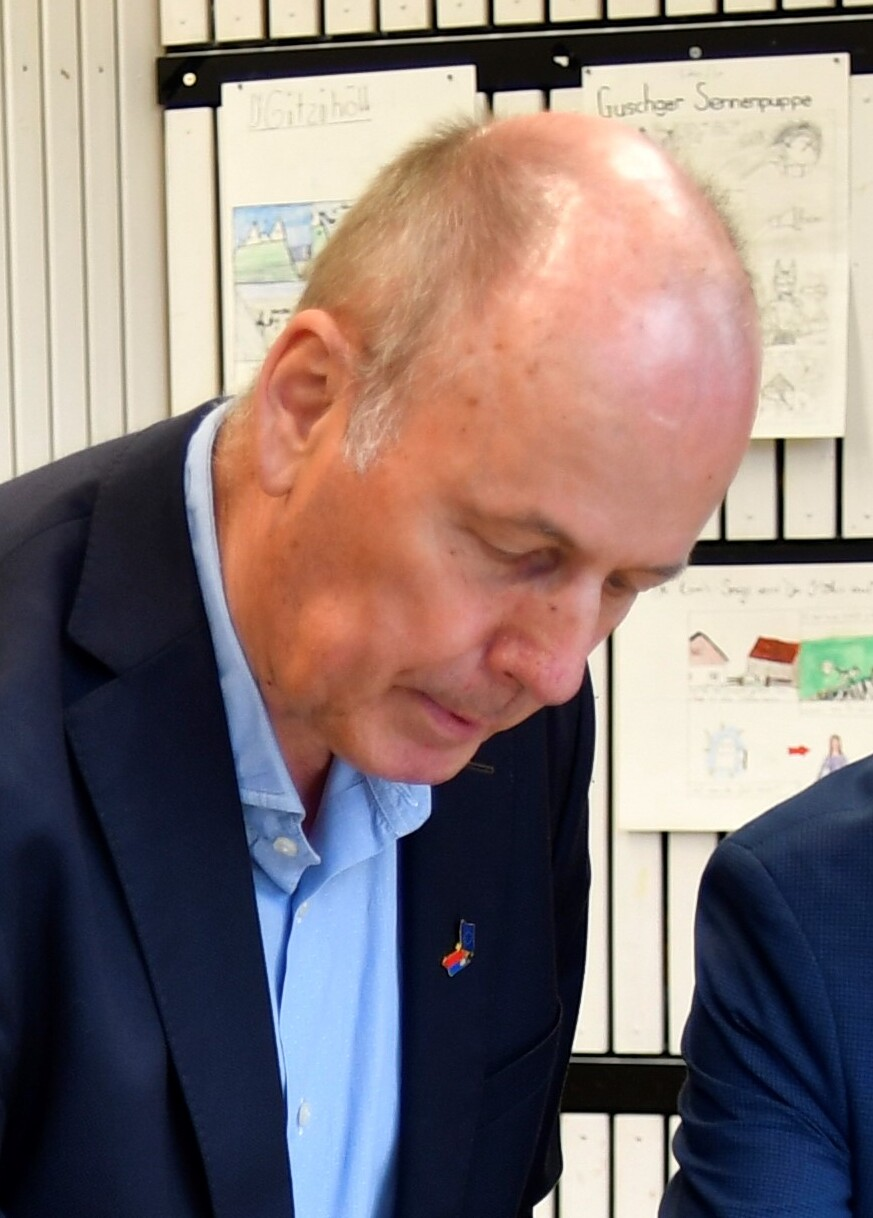
- Kaufmann in 2022

Member of the Landtag of Liechtenstein for Oberland
- In office 5 February 2017 – 9 February 2025

Personal details
- Born: 22 November 1955 (age 69); Bludenz, Austria
- Political party: Free List
- Spouse: Ingrid Sele (m. 1986)

Georg Kaufmann (born 22 November 1955) is a politician from Liechtenstein who served in the Landtag of Liechtenstein from 2017 to 2025.

== Life ==
Kaufmann was born on 22 November 1955 in Bludenz as the son of teacher Walter Kaufmann and Luzia (née Matt) as one of five children. He attended secondary school in Vaduz before from 1975 he studied secondary school teaching at the University of Freiburg, where he graduated with a diploma in 1978. From 1979 to 1980 he studied English in Edinburgh and worked as a German language assistant at Boroughmuir High School. From 1981 to 1986 he worked as a secondary school teacher in Balzers, and then in Triesen from 1986 to 1998.

From 2001 to 2009 he was a member of the state commission for gender equality. He was a board member of the Free List from 2005 to 2013 and from 2017 to 2025 he was a member of the Landtag of Liechtenstein as a member of the party. During this time, he was the chairman of the audit committee and a member of the Liechtenstein EEA commission. He was the Landtag's spokesman for the Free List from 2017 to 2021.

Kaufmann married Ingrid Sele, a secondary school teacher, on 29 June 1986. He lives in Schaan.
