= 1999 Liechtenstein health insurance referendum =

- 31 January 1999
- Referendum on health insurance

Results
Choice	Votes	%
Yes	4,135	33.97%
No	8,038	66.03%
Valid votes	12,173	97.21%
Invalid or blank votes	350	2.79%
Total votes	12,523	100.00%
Registered voters/turnout	15,253	82.1%

A referendum on health insurance was held in Liechtenstein on 31 January 1999. The proposal, regarding modification of health insurance reimbursements, was rejected by 66% of voters.

== Results ==
Choice	Votes	%
For	4,135	33.97
Against	8,038	66.03
Total	12,173	100.00
Valid votes	12,173	97.21
Invalid/blank votes	350	2.79
Total votes	12,523	100.00
Registered voters/turnout	15,253	82.10
Source: Nohlen & Stöver
