= Albert Frick (politician) =

President of the Landtag of Liechtenstein since 2013

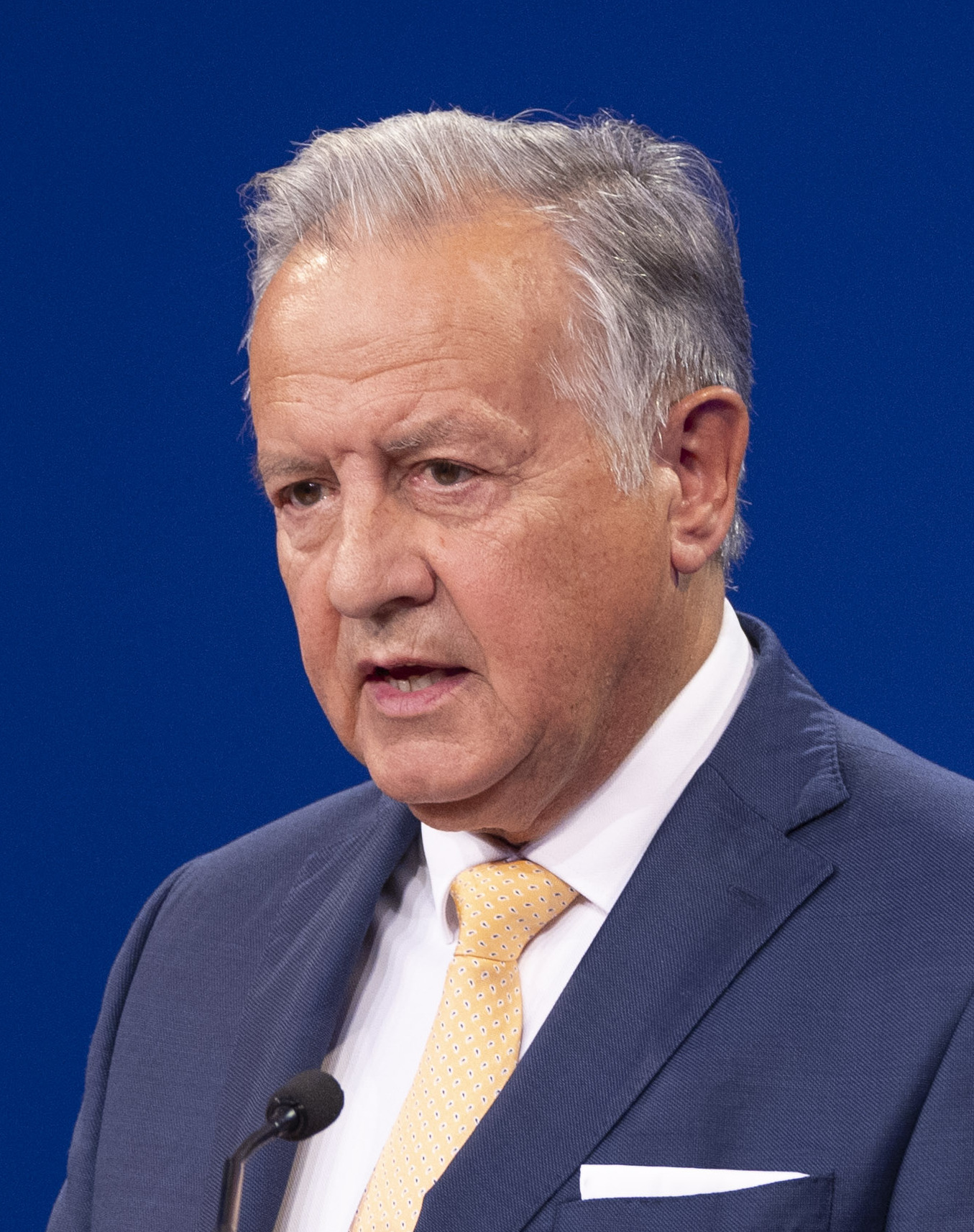
- Frick in 2023

President of the Landtag of Liechtenstein
- In office 27 March 2013 – 10 April 2025
- Vice President: Violanda Lanter; Gunilla Marxer-Kranz
- Preceded by: Arthur Brunhart
- Succeeded by: Manfred Kaufmann

Member of the Landtag of Liechtenstein for Oberland
- In office 25 March 2009 – 9 February 2025

Personal details
- Born: 21 October 1948 (age 77) Schaan, Liechtenstein
- Party: Progressive Citizens' Party
- Spouse: Elisabeth Schwab (m. 1971; died 2009) Cornelia Lang (m. 2022)
- Children: 3

Albert Frick (born 21 October 1948) is a former teacher and politician from Liechtenstein served as the President of the Landtag of Liechtenstein from 2013 to 2025. He served in the Landtag from 2009 to 2025.

== Career ==
From 1972 to 1991 Frick was a sports teacher in various schools throughout Liechtenstein, including the Liechtensteinisches Gymnasium in Vaduz and he was an inspector for school sports at the Liechtenstein school board. He was the head of the Liechtenstein team at the 1988, 1992 and 1996 summer Olympics.

From 1991 to 2011 he was a member of the Schaan municipal council and from 2003 to 2007 was deputy mayor of the municipality.

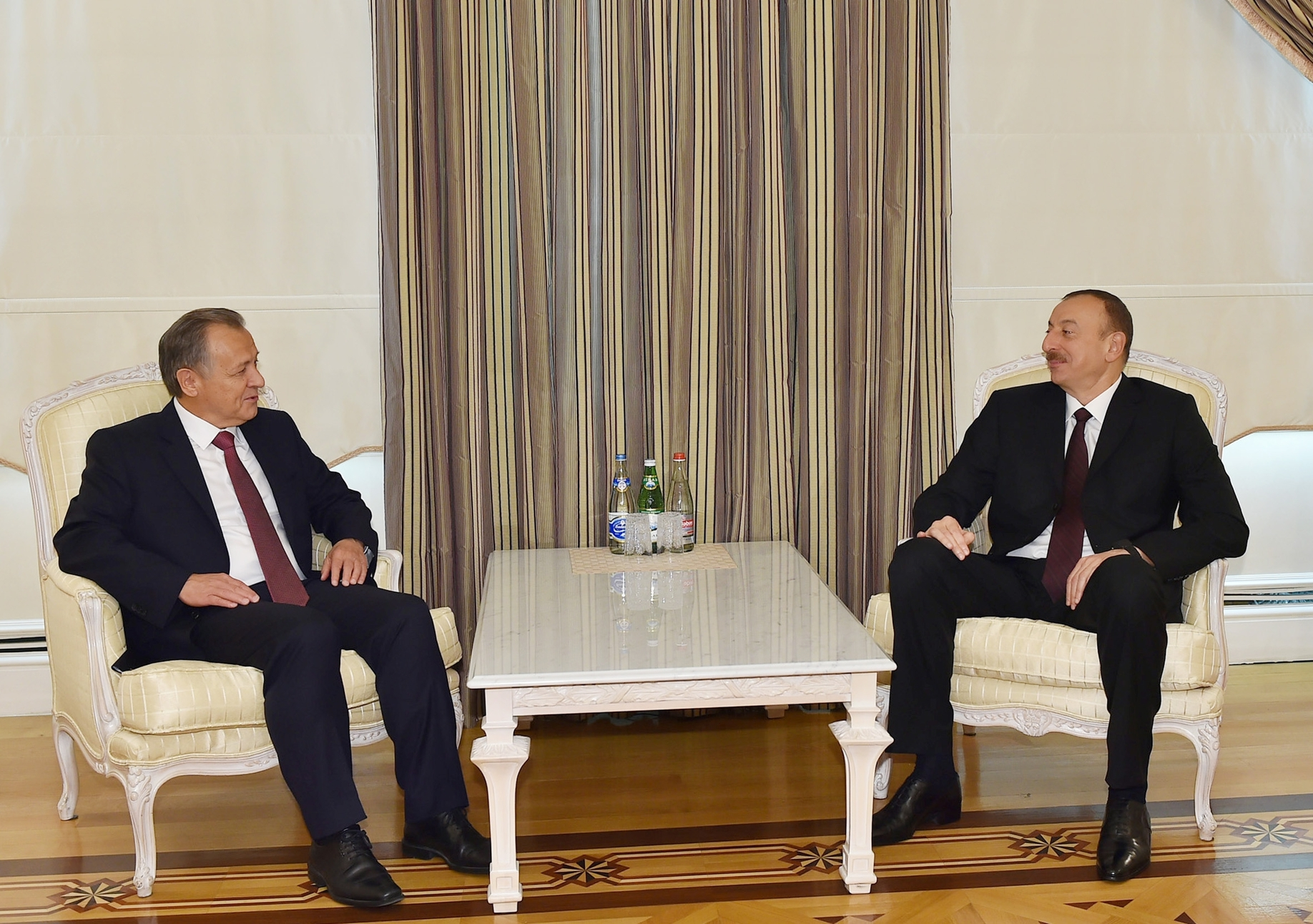
Frick (left) with Ilham Aliyev in 2015

He was a member of the Landtag of Liechtenstein from 2009 to 2025 as a member of the Progressive Citizens' Party. From March 2013 to December 2024 he was the President of the Landtag of Liechtenstein. On 9 October 2023 Frick announced that he will not be running for re-election in the 2025 Liechtenstein general election. He was succeeded by Manfred Kaufmann on 10 April 2025.

He was the head of the Liechtenstein delegation at the International Parliamentary Union from 2021 to 2025.

== Personal life ==
Frick married Elisabeth Schwab (24 July 1947 – 3 October 2009) on 9 October 1971 and they had three children together. He remarried on 2 July 2022 to Cornelia Lang, the then-head of financial control in Liechtenstein.

== Honours ==
- Liechtenstein: Grand Cross of the Order of Merit of the Principality of Liechtenstein (2025)
