= Manfred Kaufmann =

Liechtenstein politician (born 1978)

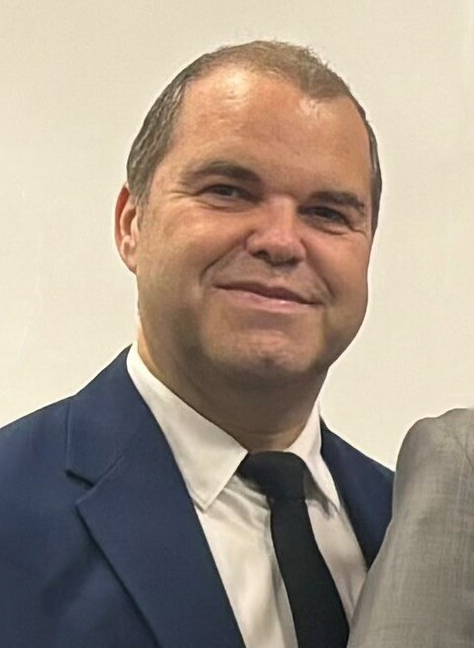
- Kaufmann in 2024

President of the Landtag of Liechtenstein
- Incumbent
- Assumed office 10 April 2025
- Vice President: Franziska Hoop
- Preceded by: Albert Frick

Member of the Landtag of Liechtenstein for Oberland
- Incumbent
- Assumed office 5 February 2017

Personal details
- Born: 9 October 1978 (age 48) Balzers, Liechtenstein
- Party: Patriotic Union
- Spouse: Dahiana Garcia Vasquez (m. 2008)
- Children: 1

Manfred Kaufmann (born 9 October 1978) is an accountant and politician from Liechtenstein who has served as the President of the Landtag of Liechtenstein since 2025. A member of the Patriotic Union (VU), he has served in the Landtag since 2017, and was the party's spokesperson in the Landtag from 2020 to 2025.

== Life ==
Kaufmann was born on 9 October 1978 in Balzers as the son of floor layer Hans Kaufmann and Hildegard (née Fehr) as one of six children. He attended school in the municipality and from 1994 to 1997 he conducted a commercial apprenticeship at TTA Trevisa-Treuhand-Anstalt in Balzers. From 1997 to 2001, he was an accountant at the company. From 2001 to 2008 he worked as an auditor at KPMG in Schaan, and then at Bank Frick & Co. AG from 2008 to 2016. From 2016 to 2018 he was an accountant at VP Bank, and from 2021 to 2025 was an auditor at BDO (Liechtenstein) AG in Vaduz. Since 2025, he has been head of finance at the law firm Gassner Partner in Schaan.

From 2011 to 2019 he was a member of the audit committee in Balzers. He was a deputy member of the Landtag of Liechtenstein from 2013 to 2017, and he has been a full member since 2017 as a member of the Patriotic Union (VU); he was a member of the foreign committee from 2017 to 2025, and its chairman from 2021 to 2025. He was the Landtag's spokesman for the VU from 2020 to 2025. During his time in the Landtag, he has called for stronger penalties against the sexual abuse of minors and "Liechtenstein first" policies for state-owned companies, prioritizing Liechtenstein-based contractors as opposed to foreign ones.

In October 2022, along with Johannes Kaiser, he proposed an initiative in the Landtag to return to the old system of pension calculation, thus at an increase for pensioners; the proposal was successfully introduced in November.

Since 10 April 2025, Kaufmann has been the President of the Landtag of Liechtenstein. Since taking office, he has supported extensive Landtag reform, including increasing the number of elected members and abolishing the deputy member position.

== Personal life ==
Kaufmann married Dahiana Garcia Vasquez on 30 May 2008 and they have one child together. He lives in Balzers.
