= Johannes Kaiser (Liechtenstein politician) =

Liechtenstein politician (born 1958)

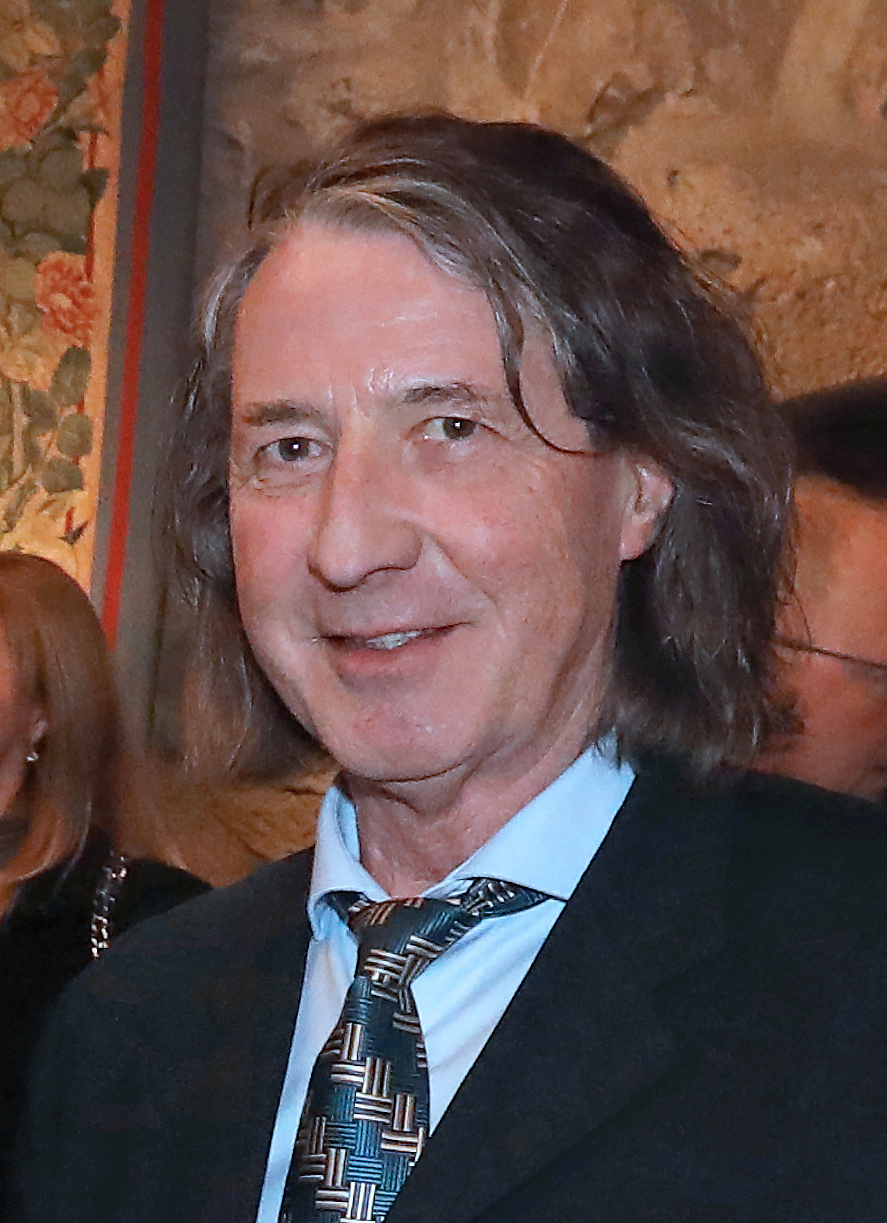
- Kaiser in 2024

Member of the Landtag of Liechtenstein for Unterland
- Incumbent
- Assumed office 11 February 2001

Mayor of Mauren
- In office February 1991 – February 2003
- Deputy: Gerold Matt (1991–1995); Peter Malin (1995–1999); Manfred Oehri (1999–2003)
- Preceded by: Hartwig Kieber
- Succeeded by: Freddy Kaiser

Personal details
- Born: 29 June 1958 (age 68) Eschen, Liechtenstein
- Party: Progressive Citizens' Party; Independent (2018–2019)
- Spouse(s): Ruth Hasler (m. 1990, divorced) Julia Kajtazaj (m. 1999)
- Relations: Maria Kaiser-Eberle (sister-in-law)
- Children: 2

Johannes Kaiser (born 29 June 1958) is a politician from Liechtenstein who has served in the Landtag of Liechtenstein since 2001. He previously served as mayor of Mauren from 1991 to 2003. A member of the Progressive Citizens' Party (FBP), he has served as the party's spokesman in the Landtag since 2025, having previously done so from 2009 to 2013.

Kaiser was the subject of controversy in 2018 when he left the FBP due to a prolonged conflict with prime minister Adrian Hasler, although the dispute was ultimately settled and he re-joined the party the following year. He was considered the leading opponent to Liechtenstein's accession to the International Monetary Fund (IMF) in 2024.

== Career ==
Kaiser was born on 29 June 1958 in Eschen as the son of teacher Paul Kaiser and Brigitte (née Biedermann) as one of five children. He attended a teachers' training college in Rickenbach, Schwyz, later training in communication and management in St. Gallen. He worked as a primary school teacher in Ruggell, and then as a secondary school teacher in Eschen until 1991.

From 1987 to 1991 Kaiser was the vice president of the Progressive Citizens' Party (FBP). He was elected as the mayor of Mauren in the 1991 local elections, defeating Manfred Biedermann of the Patriotic Union (VU). He served this position until February 2003. His time as mayor included several public works in the municipality, such as the primary school being expanded, a leisure facility being established, and the church in Schaanwald being renovated. He declined to seek re-election as mayor in 2003 and was succeeded by Freddy Kaiser in February.

He has been a member of the Landtag of Liechtenstein since 2001. During this time, he has been the FBP's spokesman in the Landtag from 2009 to 2013 and the chairman of the finance committee from 2003 to 2009 and again from 2013 to 2017. From 2009 to 2013, 2017 to 2018, and again from 2021 to 2025 he was a member of the Liechtenstein judge selection committee. Since 2025, he has again been the FBP's spokesman in the Landtag.

In 2008 Kaiser, alongside Herbert Oehri, founded the publisher Zeit-Verlag Anstalt in Eschen and he has remained a board member since. He is also an editor for the publisher's newspaper Lie:zeit.

In March 2018, Kaiser left the FBP due to personal conflicts with people in the party and he rejected talks to resolve the situation. In the previous months, Kaiser and prime minister Adrian Hasler had been publicly attacking each other, and in an interview with Radio Liechtenstein in January 2018, FBP president Thomas Banzer stated that expelling Kaiser from the party was "an option that's on the table.". Kaiser also resigned from the judge selection committee in June of the same year. He served as an independent member of the Landtag until 27 November 2019 where, upon his own request, he was readmitted into the party. He apologised for his actions and referred to them as a "mistake", and the issue was concluded by him shaking hands with Hasler. He was subsequently re-elected to the Landtag as a member of the party in 2021 and re-joined the judge selection committee the same year.

== Political positions ==
Kaiser has supported increased pension payments and opposed the increase of the retirement age in Liechtenstein. In October 2022, along with Manfred Kaufmann, he proposed an initiative in the Landtag to return to the old system of pension calculation, thus at an increase for pensioners. The proposal was successfully introduced in November.

He has also supported efforts to reduce public transport costs in Liechtenstein. In 2023, he was part of a cross-party initiative to introduce uniform bus fares to the country. In August 2025, Kaiser supported an initiative by Landtag members Sebastian Gassner, Daniel Salzgeber and Lino Nägele to introduce free public transport, which was ultimately accepted the following month.

Kaiser was the leading opponent to Liechtenstein's accession to the International Monetary Fund in 2024; he campaigned against it. During this time, he was accused by prime minister Daniel Risch of spreading misinformation. In the subsequent referendum, the proposal was accepted by voters.

== Personal life ==
Kaiser married Ruth Hasler on 23 May 1990. His second marriage was to Julia Kajtazaj on 22 September 1999 and they have two children together. He is the brother-in-law of Maria Kaiser-Eberle, the mayor of Ruggell from 2015 to 2023.

== Electoral history ==
=== Mayoral elections ===
==== 1991 Mauren mayoral election ====
Candidate	Party	Votes	%
Johannes Kaiser	Progressive Citizens' Party	650	62.98
Manfred Biedermann	Patriotic Union	382	37.02
Total		1,032	100.00
Registered voters/turnout		1,262	–
Source: Liechtensteiner Volksblatt

==== 1995 Mauren mayoral election ====
Candidate	Party	Votes	%
Johannes Kaiser	Progressive Citizens' Party	967	100.00
Total		967	100.00
Registered voters/turnout		1,346	–
Source: Liechtensteiner Volksblatt

==== 1999 Mauren mayoral election ====
Candidate	Party	Votes	%
Johannes Kaiser	Progressive Citizens' Party	1,028	100.00
Total		1,028	100.00
Registered voters/turnout		1,427	–
Source: Liechtensteiner Volksblatt

=== Landtag elections ===
Year	Constituency	Votes	Result
2001	Unterland	2785	Elected
2005	Unterland	2697	Elected
2009	Unterland	2483	Elected
2013	Unterland	2184	Elected
2017	Unterland	2080	Elected
2021	Unterland	2068	Elected
2025	Unterland	2052	Elected
Source: Lantagwahlen

== Honours ==
- Liechtenstein: Commander's Cross of the Order of Merit of the Principality of Liechtenstein (2003)

== See also ==
- Lie:zeit
