= Gunilla Marxer-Kranz =

Liechtenstein politician

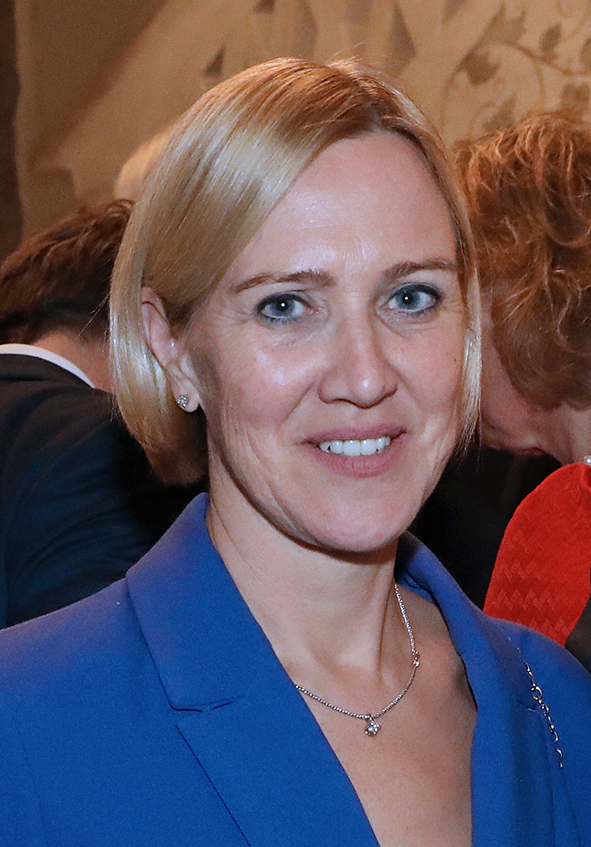
Marxer-Kranz in 2025

Gunilla Marxer-Kranz (born 28 May 1972) is a politician from Liechtenstein and the vice-president of the Landtag of Liechtenstein from 2021 to 2025.

She studied law and entered the Liechtenstein Bar. Prior to her entry to politics, she was employed part-time as a lawyer at the Liechtenstein Chamber of Commerce. She spent half a year in Colombia, where she worked at a nursery and at psychiatric wards. Her Landstag biography lists her occupations as "lawyer, housewife".

She lives in the village of Nendeln. In the 2017 general election, she was a candidate for the Patriotic Union at the Unterland electoral district. Here, she received 1,635 preferential votes, amounting to 29.5% of the electoral body, and was elected as the third-place member of the parliament of the party from the district. She got the highest percentage of votes in the Ruggell municipality, where her share stood at 36.3% with 373 votes. On 30 March 2017, she was elected as the new vice-president of the Landtag with the near-unanimous support of 24 members of the parliament.

She is married to Philipp Marxer and has two sons.
