= List of members of the Landtag of Liechtenstein (2013–2017) =

Members of the Landtag of Liechtenstein in the 46th legislature

2013–2017 Landtag of Liechtenstein
←	2009–2013 Landtag	2017–2021 Landtag	→
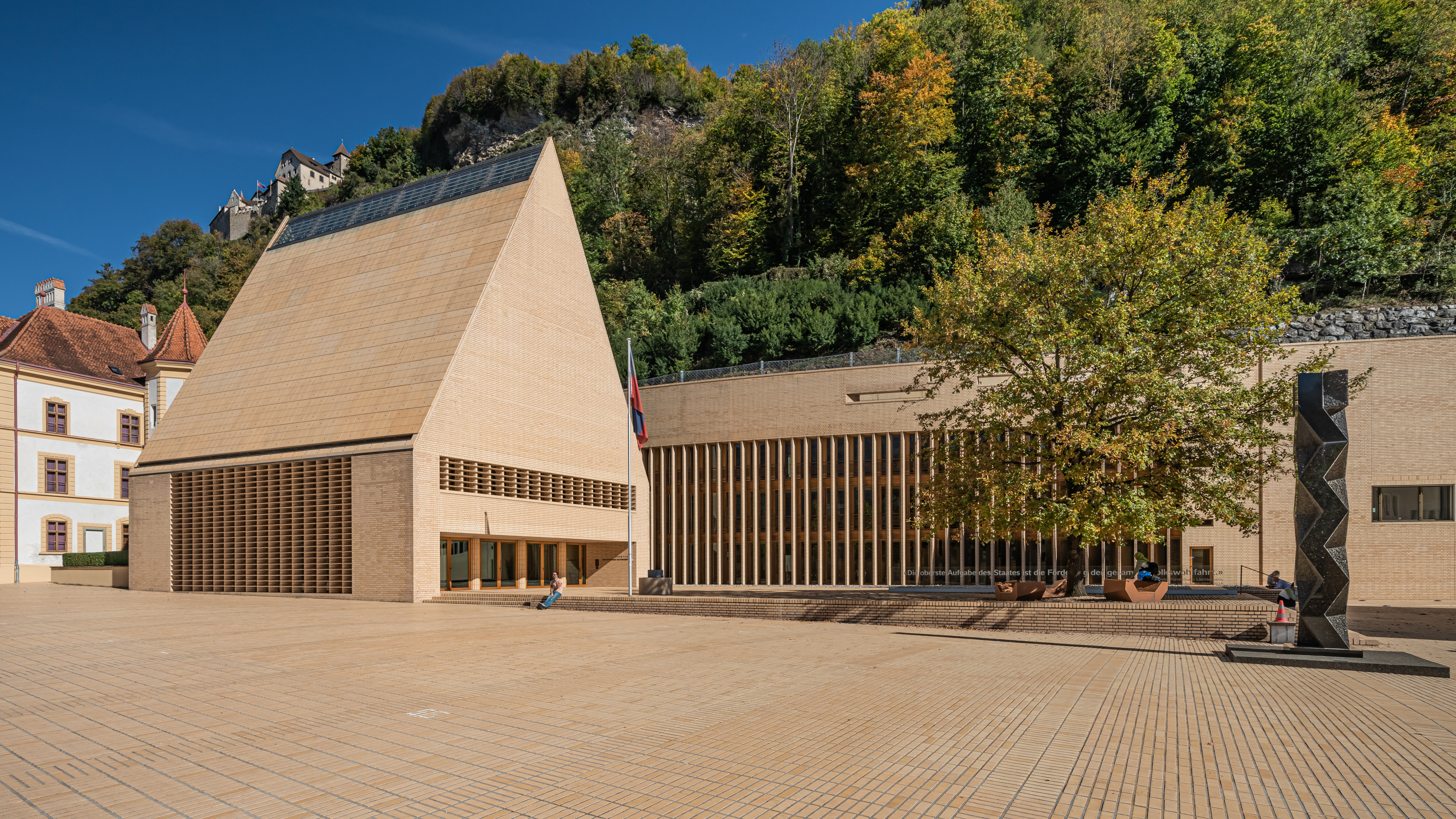
- Landtag building of Liechtenstein

Overview
- Term: 3 February 2013 – 5 February 2017
- Election: 2013 Liechtenstein general election
- Government: First Adrian Hasler cabinet

Landtag of Liechtenstein
- Members: 25
- President: Albert Frick
- Vice president: Violanda Lanter
- Prime minister: Adrian Hasler
- Deputy prime minister: Thomas Zwiefelhofer

Prince Hans-Adam II Alois (regent)

The 2013 Liechtenstein general election was held on 3 February 2013 to elect the 25 members of the Landtag. It was the 46th legislative term, and ended on 5 February 2017.

The Landtag consists of the elected members, who then elect the president and the government. Of the 25 elected, 11 were newcomers, and 3 were women. Under the composition, the Progressive Citizens' Party (FBP) held nine seats and the Patriotic Union (VU) held eight. As a result, the two parties formed a coalition government under Adrian Hasler of the FBP.

== Composition ==
Party	Seats
Patriotic Union	10
Progressive Citizens' Party	8
The Independents	4
Free List	3
Total	25
Source: Landtagswahlen 2013

== List of members ==
Constituency	Municipality	Affiliation	Name	Notes
Oberland	Vaduz	Patriotic Union	Frank Konrad	Newcomer
Oberland	Schaan	Patriotic Union	Christoph Wenaweser	Newcomer
Oberland	Triesen	Patriotic Union	Thomas Vogt	
Oberland	Triesenberg	Patriotic Union	Christoph Beck	Newcomer
Oberland	Schaan	Patriotic Union	Karin Rüdisser-Quaderer	Newcomer
Oberland	Triesen	Progressive Citizens' Party	Christian Batliner	
Oberland	Schaan	Progressive Citizens' Party	Alois Beck	
Oberland	Triesenberg	Progressive Citizens' Party	Wendelin Lampert	
Oberland	Schaan	Progressive Citizens' Party	Albert Frick	President of the Landtag
Oberland	Balzers	Progressive Citizens' Party	Christine Wohlwend	Newcomer
Oberland	Schaan	Progressive Citizens' Party	Eugen Nägele	Newcomer
Oberland	Triesen	Free List	Helen Konzett Bargetze	Newcomer
Oberland	Triesen	Free List	Thomas Lageder	Newcomer
Oberland	Schaan	The Independents	Harry Quaderer	
Oberland	Triesen	The Independents	Pio Schurti	Newcomer
Unterland	Ruggell	Patriotic Union	Judith Öhri	Newcomer
Unterland	Ruggell	Patriotic Union	Violanda Lanter-Koller	Newcomer. Vice president of the Landtag
Unterland	Schellenberg	Patriotic Union	Peter Büchel	
Unterland	Schellenberg	Progressive Citizens' Party	Johannes Kaiser	
Unterland	Gamprin	Progressive Citizens' Party	Elfried Hasler	Newcomer
Unterland	Ruggell	Progressive Citizens' Party	Gerold Büchel	Resigned in December 2015
Unterland	Eschen	Progressive Citizens' Party	Manfred Batliner	Newcomer
Unterland	Ruggell	Progressive Citizens' Party	Rainer Gopp	Newcomer. Succeeded Manfred Batliner
Unterland	Eschen	Free List	Wolfgang Marxer	
Unterland	Schellenberg	The Independents	Herbert Elkuch	Newcomer
Unterland	Eschen	The Independents	Erich Hasler	Newcomer
