= List of members of the Landtag of Liechtenstein (2017–2021) =

Members of the Landtag of Liechtenstein in the 47th legislature

2017–2021 Landtag of Liechtenstein
←	2013–2017 Landtag	2021–2025 Landtag	→
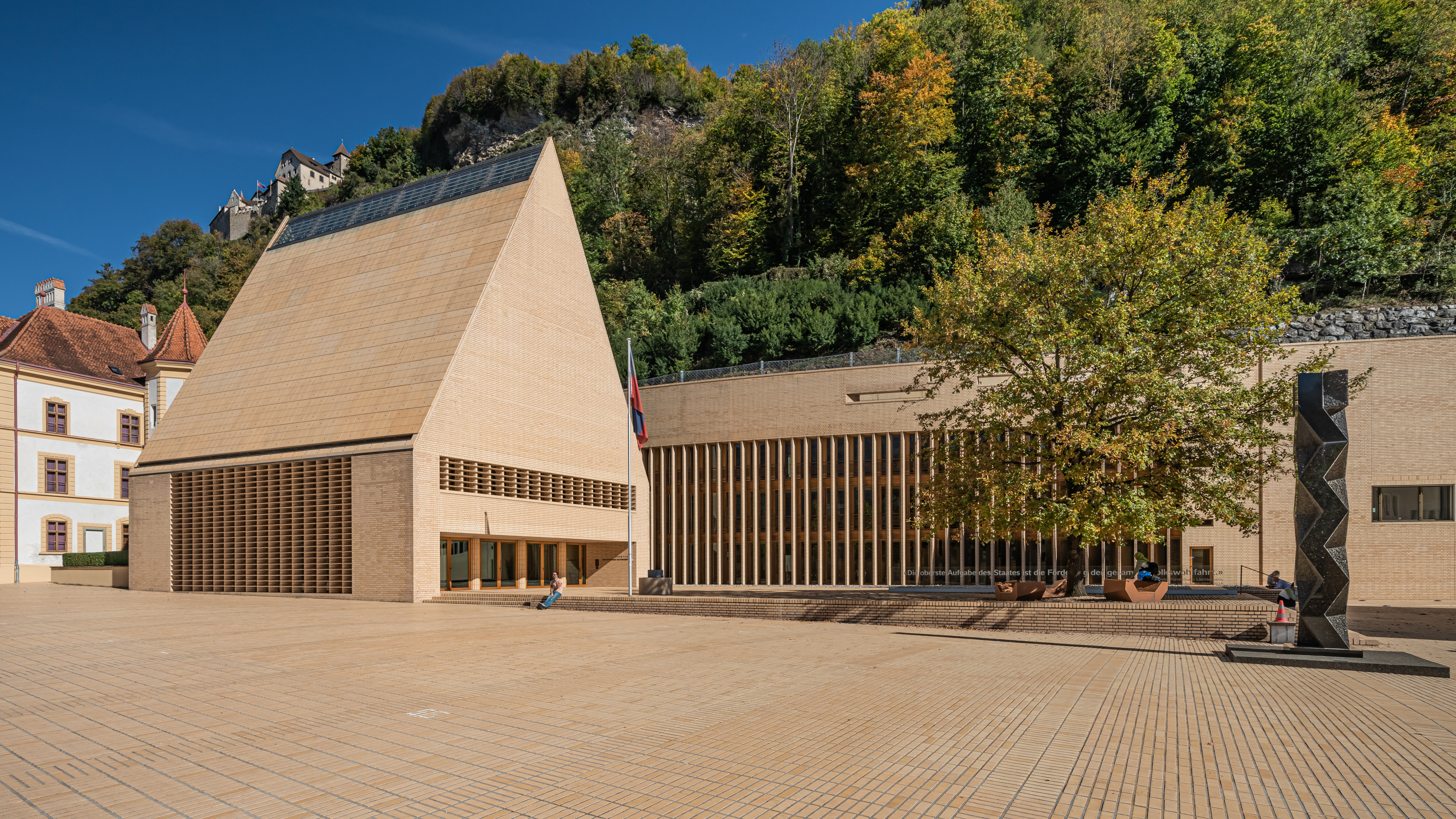
- Landtag building of Liechtenstein

Overview
- Term: 5 February 2017 – 7 February 2021
- Election: 2017 Liechtenstein general election
- Government: Second Adrian Hasler cabinet

Landtag of Liechtenstein
- Members: 25
- President: Albert Frick
- Vice president: Gunilla Marxer-Kranz
- Prime minister: Adrian Hasler
- Deputy prime minister: Daniel Risch

Prince Hans-Adam II Alois (regent)

The 2017 Liechtenstein general election was held on 5 February 2017 to elect the 25 members of the Landtag. It was the 47th legislative term, and ended on 7 February 2021.

The Landtag consists of the elected members, who then elect the president and the government. Of the 25 elected, 11 were newcomers, and 3 were women. Under the composition, the Progressive Citizens' Party (FBP) held nine seats and the Patriotic Union (VU) held eight. As a result, the two parties formed a coalition government under Adrian Hasler of the FBP.

In August 2018, The Independents (DU) Landtag member Erich Hasler was expelled from the party. Fellow Landtag members Thomas Rehak and Herbert Elkuch left the DU in opposition to the expulsion. The following month the three men formed the Democrats for Liechtenstein, and represented the party in the Landtag from then on.

== Composition ==
Party	Seats
Patriotic Union	9
Progressive Citizens' Party	8
The Independents	5
Free List	3
Total	25
Source: Landtagswahlen 2017

== List of members ==
Constituency	Municipality	Affiliation	Image	Name	Notes
Oberland	Balzers	Patriotic Union		Manfred Kaufmann	Newcomer
Oberland	Triesen	Patriotic Union		Thomas Vogt	
Oberland	Schaan	Patriotic Union		Christoph Wenaweser	
Oberland	Balzers	Patriotic Union		Günter Vogt	Newcomer
Oberland	Vaduz	Patriotic Union		Frank Konrad	
Oberland	Triesenberg	Progressive Citizens' Party		Eugen Nägele	
Oberland	Schaan	Progressive Citizens' Party		Daniel Seger	Newcomer
Oberland	Triesenberg	Progressive Citizens' Party		Wendelin Lampert	
Oberland	Schaan	Progressive Citizens' Party		Albert Frick	President of the Landtag
Oberland	Planken	Progressive Citizens' Party		Susanne Eberle-Strub	Newcomer
Oberland	Schaan	Free List		Georg Kaufmann	Newcomer
Oberland	Triesen	Free List		Thomas Lageder	
Oberland	Schaan	The Independents		Harry Quaderer	
Oberland	Vaduz	The Independents		Jürgen Beck	
Oberland	Triesen	The Independents		Thomas Rehak	Newcomer. Switched to the Democrats for Liechtenstein in September 2018
Unterland	Eschen	Patriotic Union		Gunilla Marxer-Kranz	Newcomer. Vice president of the Landtag
Unterland	Ruggell	Patriotic Union		Violanda Lanter-Koller	
Unterland	Ruggell	Patriotic Union		Mario Wohlwend	
Unterland	Gamprin	Progressive Citizens' Party		Johannes Hasler	Newcomer. Resigned on 31 October 2019
Unterland	Mauren	Progressive Citizens' Party		Alexander Batliner	Newcomer. Succeeded Johannes Hasler on 6 November 2019
Unterland	Schellenberg	Progressive Citizens' Party		Johannes Kaiser	
Unterland	Eschen	Progressive Citizens' Party		Daniel Oehry	Newcomer
Unterland	Eschen	Progressive Citizens' Party		Elfried Hasler	
Unterland	Schellenberg	Free List		Patrick Risch	Newcomer
Unterland	Schellenberg	The Independents		Herbert Elkuch	Switched to the Democrats for Liechtenstein in September 2018
Unterland	Eschen	The Independents		Erich Hasler	Was expelled from The Independents and switched to the Democrats for Liechtenstein in September 2018
