= Jürgen Beck (politician) =

Liechtenstein politician (born 1961)

Member of the Landtag of Liechtenstein for Oberland
- In office 5 February 2017 – 7 February 2021
- In office 13 March 2005 – 3 February 2013

Personal details
- Born: 22 July 1961 (age 64) Chur, Switzerland
- Party: The Independents (from 2013)
- Other political affiliations: Patriotic Union (until 2013)
- Children: 3

Jürgen Beck (born 22 July 1961) is a politician from Liechtenstein who served in the Landtag of Liechtenstein from 2005 to 2013 and again from 2017 to 2021.

== Life ==
Beck was born on 22 July 1961 in Chur as the son of Max Beck and Hilda (née Vedana). He attended secondary school in Vaduz, and then conducted a commercial apprenticeship at Hilti in Schaan. Since 1990 he has been the manager and co-owner of a transport and waste company in Vaduz, which was founded by his father. As of 2021, he has been a member of the board of the Liechtenstein transport industry since 1998 and since 2005 he has been the vice president of the Buch waste disposal association. He was a member of the audit committee for passenger and road transport companies.

From 1999 to 2007 he was a member of the Vaduz municipal council as a member of the Patriotic Union. He was a member of the Landtag of Liechtenstein from 2005 to 2013 as a member of the Patriotic Union. During this time, he was the head of the Liechtenstein delegation to the Inter-Parliamentary Union from 2009 to 2013.

In 2013 he left the party and joined The Independents. He was then elected to the Landtag as a member of the party in 2017. When Erich Hasler was expelled from The Independents in August 2018, Beck was the only Landtag member belonging to the party to side with Harry Quaderer. The rest (Herbert Elkuch and Thomas Rehak) left the party in response to Hasler's expulsion. He did not seek re-election in the 2021 elections.

Beck married Barbara Miller on 4 June 1988 and they have three children together. He lives in Vaduz.
