= 2013 Liechtenstein general election =

- 3 February 2013
- All 25 seats in the Landtag; 13 seats needed for a majority
- Turnout: 79.80% (▼4.84pp)
Party	Leader	Vote %	Seats	+/–
FBP	Adrian Hasler	40.00	10	−1
VU	Thomas Zwiefelhofer	33.55	8	−5
DU	Harry Quaderer	15.32	4	New
FL	Pepo Frick	11.13	3	+2
This lists parties that won seats. See the complete results below.
Vote share by municipality
Prime Minister before	Prime Minister after
Klaus Tschütscher; VU	Adrian Hasler; FBP

General elections were held in Liechtenstein on 3 February 2013 to elect the 25 members of the Landtag. The Progressive Citizens' Party (FBP) won a plurality of ten seats, with the Patriotic Union (VU) winning eight, the lowest in its history. The Independents (DU), which had been formed earlier in the year, won four seats. The Free List won three seats. It was the first time that four parties won seats in the Landtag. Voter turnout was 79.8%.

Incumbent prime minister, Klaus Tschütscher, did not run for re-election. The VU nominated Thomas Zwiefelhofer for prime minister, while the FBP nominated Adrian Hasler and the Free List nominated Pepo Frick for the position, being the first time that there was three candidates for the position. Following the elections, the FBP and VU were asked to form a coalition government, ultimately under the leadership of Hasler. The new government was sworn in on 27 March 2013. The election is generally considered the end of the two-party system between the FBP and VU, moving towards a multi-party system.

== Background ==
In the 2009 elections the Patriotic Union (VU) gained a majority of thirteen seats, whereas the Progressive Citizens' Party (FBP) won eleven seats and the Free List won one seat. As a result, the VU and FBP formed a coalition government, ultimately under the leadership of Klaus Tschütscher.

Tschütscher's term in office was marked by an effort to move the country away from being a tax haven following the 2008 Liechtenstein tax affair, and included the introduction of austerity measures. In addition, it involved the passing of a same-sex registered partnership law and Liechtenstein joining the Schengen Area, both in 2011. The VU lost its majority in February 2011 when Landtag member Harry Quaderer left the party, being the first time in Liechtenstein's history that an incumbent Landtag member had done so.

== Landtag members not running for re-election ==
Member	Constituency	First elected	Party
Arthur Brunhart	Oberland	2005	Patriotic Union
Diana Hilti	Oberland	2009	Patriotic Union
Gebhard Negele	Oberland	2005	Patriotic Union
Peter Hilti	Oberland	2009	Patriotic Union
Elmar Kindle	Oberland	1997	Progressive Citizens' Party
Doris Frommelt	Oberland	2005	Progressive Citizens' Party
Peter Lampert	Oberland	2001	Progressive Citizens' Party
Pepo Frick	Oberland	2005	Free List
Doris Beck	Unterland	2005	Patriotic Union
Günther Kranz	Unterland	2005	Patriotic Union
Marlies Amann-Marxer	Unterland	2005	Patriotic Union
Renate Wohlwend	Unterland	Feb 1993	Progressive Citizens' Party

== Electoral system ==
The 25 members of the Landtag are elected by open list proportional representation from two constituencies, Oberland with 15 seats and Unterland with 10 seats. Voters voted for a party list and then may have struck through candidates for whom they did not wish to cast a preferential vote, and may also have added names of candidates from other lists. The electoral threshold to win a seat was 8%. Landtag members sit for a four-year term. Once formed, the Landtag elected the prime minister and two government councillors who were then appointed by the reigning prince to govern in a cabinet. Voting was compulsory by law, and those who failed to vote without a valid reason may be fined, but it was not enforced. Polling stations were open only for one and a half hours on election day. Citizens over 18 years of age who had been resident in the country for at least one month prior to election day were eligible to vote.

== Campaign ==
=== Main parties ===
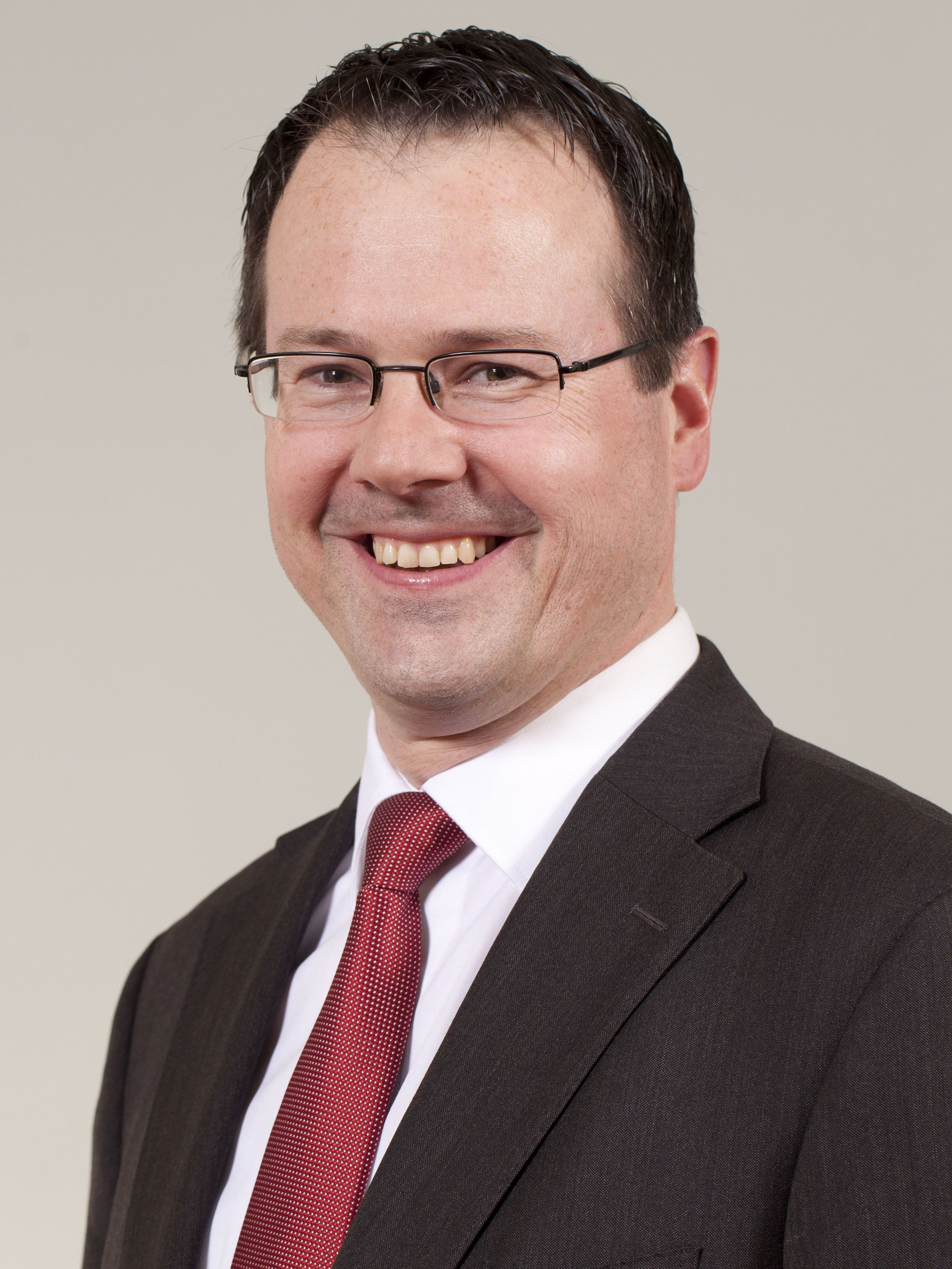
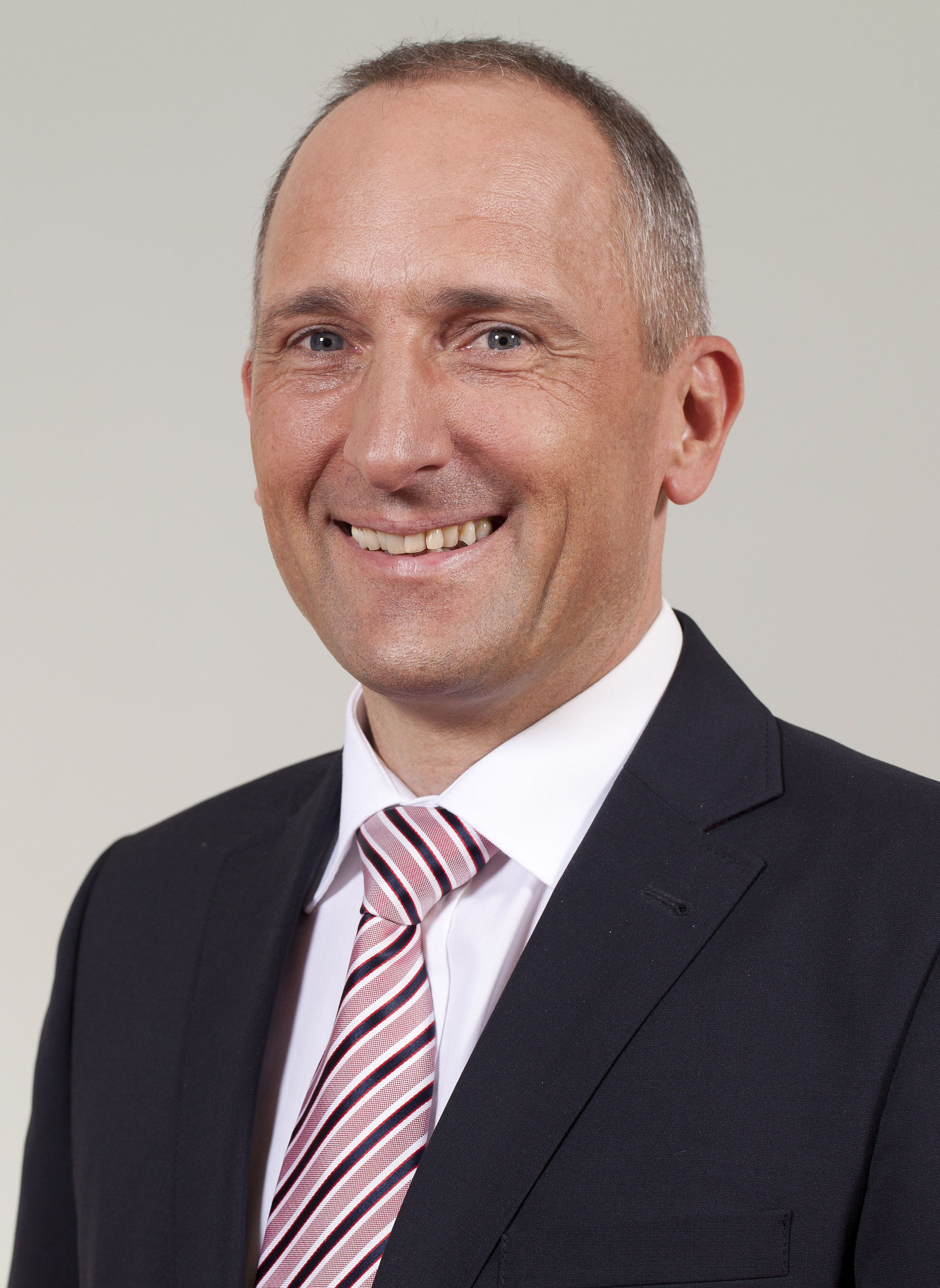
Thomas Zwiefelhofer (left) and Adrian Hasler (right) were the VU and FBP's respective nominations for prime minister

In a press conference on 10 May 2012, Tschütscher declared his intention to not seek re-election, being the first prime minister that chose not to do so; it was speculated by foreign media that his reasoning was to prevent a defeat of the VU. The VU nominated Thomas Zwiefelhofer for prime minister on 21 August 2012. Other people considered for the position included former Mayor of Vaduz Karlheinz Ospelt, but he declined to seek the position. Additionally, the party nominated Marlies Amann-Marxer and Marcus Rick as government candidates. The party aimed to remain the largest party in the Landtag, but Zwiefelhofer also stated that he intended to be part of the next government regardless if the VU lost the election.

The FBP nominated chief of the National Police Adrian Hasler for prime minister. Additionally, the party nominated Mauro Pedrazzini and Aurelia Frick as government candidates. Hasler stated that he would not be a part of the next government should the FBP lose the election, instead remaining as the chief of police. VU party president Jakob Büchel criticized the newspaper Liechtensteiner Volksblatt for revealing the VU's government candidates ahead of time, which the newspaper defended against and called Büchel's statement a "backward step in press freedom".

Major issues of the election was the Liechtenstein state budget, immigration, and pension reform. In particular, increasing the government's revenue was a controversial issue; the FBP campaigned on raising the retirement age, increased taxation for higher incomes, and introducing a policy of withholding tax on cross-border commuters’ incomes. On the other hand, the VU rejected the introduction of a minimum tax; it campaigned on the continued introduction of austerity measures and, diversifying the economy, and investing in education. Both parties stated that they were open to the formation of a renewed coalition government.

=== Opposition parties ===
The Free List nominated physician and Landtag member Pepo Frick for prime minister in October 2012, being the first time that the party presented a candidate for the position; the party stated that it was open to the formation of a coalition with other parties. It was speculated that the Free List could fail to reach the electoral threshold of 8% to re-enter the Landtag, as it had received only 8.9% of the vote in 2009. The party campaigned on extending the lifetime working period and moderate liberalization of Liechtenstein's immigration policies. The party's programme also included policies such as economic support for the disadvantaged, equal participation between men and women, and environmental protection.

Harry Quaderer, who had been serving as an independent member of the Landtag since leaving the VU in February 2011, formed an electoral group around him in late 2012. The group did not consider itself a political party, but instead as a coalition of independent candidates. It did not adopt a manifesto for the election, and candidates were given significant autonomy on their positions; candidates campaigned broadly on members of the government being directly elected and voting rights for Liechtensteiners living abroad. It also campaigned for reducing the corporate tax rate.

== Opinion polls ==
On 28 January 2013, the newspaper Liechtensteiner Vaterland published a poll in which they asked their readers, "Which party conducted the best election campaign?" About 10,000 people responded, and the results of the poll were as follows:

Source	Date	VU	FBP	DU	FL	Other
Vaterland	28 January 2013	44.8%	40.5%	6.8%	7.9%	—

== Candidates ==
Candidates had the same eligibility criteria as voters. Political parties in Liechtenstein required the support of 30 voters from a constituency to be eligible to nominate a candidate list in it. A total of 68 candidates contested the election; 50 men and 18 women.

Oberland	FBP	VU	DU	FL
Oberland	Christian Batliner; Alois Beck; Wendelin Lampert; Christine Wohlwend; Albert Frick; Eugen Nägele; Norman Marxer; Helmuth Büchel; Wilfried Ospelt; Barbara Schädler-Lampert; Günther Boss; René Vogt; Gaston Jehle; Carolina Marxer; Markus Bürgler	Frank Konrad; Christoph Wenaweser; Thomas Vogt; Christoph Beck; Karin Rüdisser-Quaderer; Manfred Kaufmann; Peter Hilti; Marion Kindle-Kühnis; Stefan Schädler; Edith Maier Vogt; Leander Schädler; Markus Rutz; Ursula Oehry-Walther; Albert Vogt; Ines Rampone-Wanger	Harry Quaderer; Pio Schurti; Thomas Rehak; Paul Lenherr; Toni Jäger; Giovanna Gould	Helen Konzett Bargetze; Thomas Lageder; Andreas Heeb; René Hasler; Derya Kesci; Elisabeth Seger
Unterland	FBP	VU	DU	FL
Unterland	Johannes Kaiser; Elfried Hasler; Gerold Büchel; Manfred Batliner; Rainer Gopp; Carmen Zanghellini-Pfeiffer; René Schierscher; Hubert Lampert; Othmar Oehri; Petra Schäper-Vogt	Judith Öhri; Violanda Lanter-Koller; Peter Büchel; Werner Kranz; Dominik Oehri; Gabriel Hoop; Martina Brändle-Nipp; Roland Alber; Philipp Gstöhl; Nina Schwarzkopf-Hilti	Herbert Elkuch; Erich Hasler; Peter Wachter; Johannes Ilic	Wolfgang Marxer; Patrick Risch
Source: Landtagswahlen 2013

== Results ==
The FBP received 40% of the vote, a 7.5% increase from their 2009 performance, and won ten seats in the Landtag. The VU received 33.6% of the vote, a 14% decrease from 2009, and won eight seats at a decrease of five, the lowest in the party's history. The DU received 15.3% of the vote and won four seats, the highest of any third party in Liechtenstein's history to that point. The Free List saw its vote share increase from 8.9% to 11.1% from 2009, and won three seats. This was the first election in Liechtenstein in which four different political groups won seats in the Landtag.

A total of 15,363 ballots were cast, resulting in a 79.8% voter turnout. The majority of votes (96%) were cast by post.

Party	Votes	%	Seats	+/–
Progressive Citizens' Party	77,644	40.00	10	–1
Patriotic Union	65,118	33.55	8	–5
The Independents	29,739	15.32	4	New
Free List	21,604	11.13	3	+2
Total	194,105	100.00	25	0
Valid votes	14,723	95.83		
Invalid/blank votes	640	4.17		
Total votes	15,363	100.00		
Registered voters/turnout	19,251	79.80		
Source: Landtagswahlen 2013

=== By electoral district ===
Electoral district	Seats	Electorate	Party	Candidates	Subsititutes	Votes	%	Swing	Seats won	+/–
Oberland	15	12,521	Progressive Citizens' Party	Christian Batliner; Alois Beck; Wendelin Lampert; Christine Wohlwend; Albert Frick; Eugen Nägele	Norman Marxer; Helmuth Büchel	55,233	39.3	▼2.5	6	0
Oberland	15	12,521	Patriotic Union	Frank Konrad; Christoph Wenaweser; Thomas Vogt; Christoph Beck; Karin Rüdisser-Quaderer	Manfred Kaufmann	48,586	34.6	▼14.3	5	▼3
Oberland	15	12,521	The Independents	Harry Quaderer; Pio Schurti	Thomas Rehak	20,748	14.8	New	2	New
Oberland	15	12,521	Free List	Helen Konzett Bargetze; Thomas Lageder	Andreas Heeb	16,058	11.4	▲2.0	2	▲2
Unterland	10	6,730	Progressive Citizens' Party	Johannes Kaiser; Elfried Hasler; Gerold Büchel; Manfred Batliner	Rainer Gopp	22,411	41.9	▼6.3	4	▼1
Unterland	10	6,730	Patriotic Union	Judith Öhri; Violanda Lanter-Koller; Peter Büchel	Werner Kranz	16,532	30.9	▼13.3	3	▼2
Unterland	10	6,730	The Independents	Herbert Elkuch; Erich Hasler	Peter Wachter	8,991	16.8	New	2	New
Unterland	10	6,730	Free List	Wolfgang Marxer	Patrick Risch	5,546	10.4	▲2.7	1	▲1
Source: Landtagswahlen 2013

== Aftermath ==
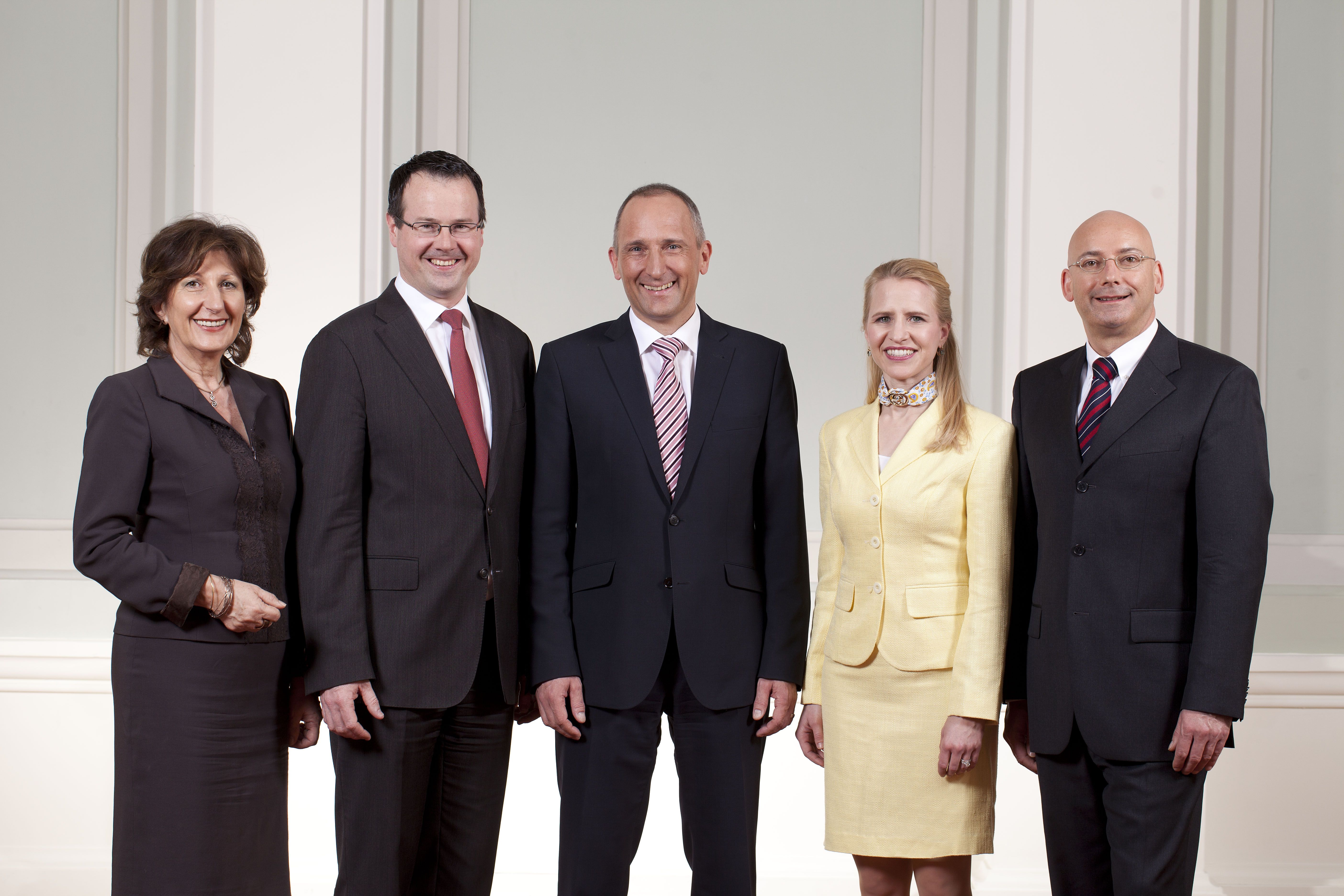
The government of Adrian Hasler

Following the election, the FBP invited the VU to begin negotiations for a renewed coalition government, which the VU accepted. The two parties entered into a renewed coalition government, ultimately under the leadership of Hasler. As the junior party in the coalition, Zwiefelhofer became deputy prime minister. The new government was sworn in on 27 March 2013. Albert Frick of the FBP became President of the Landtag, with Violanda Lanter-Koller of the VU as vice president.

Following the election, the group around Quaderer formalized to form The Independents (DU) in order to be entitled to public funding; the success of the group was considered by observers to be a result of protest votes against austerity measures in the country. It was also postulated that greater diversity in the Landtag was a result of a decreased partisanship of voters. The election is generally considered the end of the two-party system between the FBP and VU, moving towards a multi-party system. Members of the VU expressed their disappointment of the result.

== See also ==
- Elections in Liechtenstein
- List of Liechtenstein general elections
