= Peter Büchel =

Peter Büchel may refer to:

- Peter Büchel (politician, born 1872) (1872–1958), Member of the Landtag of Liechtenstein and government councillor
- Peter Büchel (politician, born 1958) (born 1958), Member of the Landtag of Liechtenstein
