= Democrats for Liechtenstein =

Democrats for Liechtenstein Demokraten pro Liechtenstein
- Abbreviation: DpL
- Leader: Thomas Rehak
- Founded: 21 September 2018
- Split from: The Independents
- Ideology: Conservative liberalism; National conservatism; Economic liberalism; Right-wing populism; Euroscepticism
- Political position: Right-wing to far-right
- European affiliation: European Conservatives, Patriots & Affiliates
- Colours: Blue
- Landtag: 6 / 25
- Mayors: 0 / 11
- Municipal Councils: 5 / 104

Website
- www.dpl.li

The Democrats for Liechtenstein (German: Demokraten pro Liechtenstein; abbreviated DpL) is a political party in Liechtenstein. Formed as a splinter of the Independents in September 2018, the party holds six seats in the Landtag of Liechtenstein.

== History ==
On 16 August 2018, Landtag member Erich Hasler was expelled from the Independents (DU) due to disagreements with party leader Harry Quaderer regarding party organization and membership. Thomas Rehak and Herbert Elkuch, also members of the Landtag representing the Independents, subsequently left the party in opposition to Hasler's expulsion. The three founded a new parliamentary group, provisionally named "New Faction" (German: Neue Fraktion). This left the Independents with only two members of the Landtag; the new group was granted DU's seat in the presidium of the Landtag. The Democrats for Liechtenstein (DpL) party was officially founded on 21 September 2018, with Thomas Rehak becoming its leader.

There was initially controversy about whether the DpL was entitled to public funding, since it had entered the Landtag without standing for election. In February 2019, the Administrative Court granted DpL the annual lump sum of CHF 55,000 which all parties represented in the Landtag are entitled to under the Political Party Financing Act.

In the 2021 election, the DpL won two seats, with Thomas Rehak and Herbert Elkuch remaining members of the Landtag, and Erich Hasler elected deputy member for DpL.

In 2024 polling, the party was expected to receive a significantly increased share of the vote from 2021 in the 2025 general election. In the election, it won 6 seats in the Landtag, the highest amount of any third party in Liechtenstein's history.

== Political positions ==
The DpL, along with the DU, is considered ideologically right-wing populist. It is sceptical of migration and European integration.

The party launched a popular initiative in 2022 for the exemption of pensioners from the annual health insurance deductible in response to the Landtag rejecting a proposal on 29 September 2021. The proposal received 2,846 valid signatures on 29 April 2022, and it was accepted in the subsequent referendum on 26 June.

On 27 June 2023 the DpL proposed a popular initiative for the constitution of Liechtenstein to be amended to change the election of Prime Minister and government to be elected then is given to the Landtag as a proposal, which is then voted for in secret ballots. If the parties with the highest number of votes enter into a coalition agreement following the election, then five of the six nominated candidates will form the future government. If no coalition agreement is reached, the party with the highest vote must nominate two additional government ministers who are not already a member. The initiative received 1,994 valid signatures, but was rejected by voters in the subsequent referendum on 25 February 2024.

The DpL has pioneered another popular initiative regarding the privatization of Radio Liechtenstein, the Liechtenstein state broadcasting station. It received 1,729 valid signatures on 2 August 2024 and was accepted in the subsequent referendum on 27 October.

== Election results ==
=== Landtag elections ===
| Election | Leader | Votes | % | Seats | +/– | Rank | Status |
|---|---|---|---|---|---|---|---|
| 2021 | Thomas Rehak | 22,456 | 11.14 | 2 / 25 | New | ▲4th | Opposition |
| 2025 | Thomas Rehak | 48,370 | 23.32 | 6 / 25 | ▲4 | ▲3rd | Opposition |

=== Local elections ===
Mayoral elections
| Year | First round | | | Second round | | | Total |
| Year | Votes | % | Mayors | Votes | % | Mayors | Total |
|---|---|---|---|---|---|---|---|
| 2019 | 719 | 5.5 | 0 | 625 | 11.5 | 0 | 0 |

Municipal councils
| Year | Votes | % | Seats |
|---|---|---|---|
| 2019 | 3,119 | 2.1 | 1 / 104 |
| 2023 | 8,980 | 6.1 | 5 / 104 |
