= Elfried Hasler =

Liechtenstein economist and politician (born 1965)

Member of the Landtag of Liechtenstein for Unterland
- In office 3 February 2013 – 7 February 2021

President of the Progressive Citizens' Party
- In office December 2013 – April 2015
- Preceded by: Alexander Batliner
- Succeeded by: Thomas Banzer

Personal details
- Born: 11 June 1965 (age 61) Gamprin, Liechtenstein
- Party: Progressive Citizens' Party
- Spouse: Myriam Quaderer (m. 1992)
- Children: 2

Elfried Hasler (born 11 June 1965) is an economist and politician from Liechtenstein who served in the Landtag of Liechtenstein from 2013 to 2021. A member of the Progressive Citizens' Party (FBP), he also served as the party's president from 2013 to 2015.

== Life ==
Hasler was born on 11 June 1965 in Eschen as the son of farmer Gebhard Hasler and Melanie (née Oehri) as one of four children. He studied business administration, specializing in marketing, in St. Gallen before training further at AZEK in Zurich as a federally certified financial analyst and asset manager, and then as a federally certified financial and investment expert, graduating in 1993 and 1998 respectively.

He has worked at various banks as a financial advisor in Austria, Liechtenstein, and Switzerland since 2000, and was a member of the executive board of the National Bank of Liechtenstein from 2000 to 2011. Since 2013, he has also worked as a self-employed financial expert.

Hasler was a member of the Landtag of Liechtenstein from 2013 to 2021 as a member of the Progressive Citizens' Party (FBP). During this time, he was also the head of the Liechtenstein delegation to the Parliamentary Committee of the EEA/EFTA from 2014 to 2017, and then the chairman of the Liechtenstein EEA commission from 2017 to 2021. He was also the president of the FBP from December 2013; he resigned this position following the 2015 local elections and was succeeded by Thomas Banzer in April 2015.

During his time in the Landtag, Hasler alongside government councillor Mauro Pedrazzini, was the subject of controversy in September 2015 when he publicly revealed that the president of the Liechtenstein medical association, Ruth Kranz, was being investigated for an economic efficiency review following the amendment of the Health Insurance Act. The other parties in the Landtag (Patriotic Union, The Independents, and Free List) criticized this, accusing the investigation as a "scheme" and "witch hunt".

In addition, Hasler opposed the 2016 Family Allowances Act referendum, notably against the FBP's leadership, and a school construction strategy in 2018. He did not seek re-election in the 2021 elections.

== Personal life ==
Hasler married Myriam Quaderer on 12 June 1992 and they have two children together. He lives in Gamprin. Hasler is a guitarist for the Eschen-based band Philomena, which re-united in 2024 for its 40th anniversary.
