= Radio Liechtenstein =

Defunct radio station in Liechtenstein

- Final logo, used from 2022 to 2025
- Schaan; Liechtenstein
- Broadcast area: Liechtenstein, Switzerland & Austria

Programming
- Language: German
- Network: Liechtenstein Broadcasting Corporation

Ownership
- Owner: Government of Liechtenstein
- Operator: Doris Quaderer

History
- First air date: 15 August 1995
- Last air date: 3 April 2025
- Former names: Radio L

Links
- Website: www.radio.li

Radio Liechtenstein, often shortened to Radio L, was the public radio station of Liechtenstein. It was the first and primary station to broadcast in Liechtenstein. They primarily broadcast local news, world news, music, sports, events and podcasts. There were plans to launch a radio broadcaster in the late 1930s, but this was discontinued. They resurfaced in 1991, and the station was launched on 15 August 1995. It was operated by the Liechtenstein Broadcasting Corporation (LRF) and funded by the Liechtenstein Government. Its headquarters were located in Schaan.

In 2021, the station reported an average listenership of 21,530 people, 10,800 of whom came from within Liechtenstein itself. The rest of the listeners of the station were mainly from Switzerland, from its German-speaking population in its north-east, which borders Liechtenstein. Due to the high commuter flows from Switzerland, Radio Liechtenstein's official broadcast area included the lower Rhine Valley, which was served by two FM stations in St. Margrethen and Thal and the DAB block in eastern Switzerland as far as Lake Constance. The station went off air on 3 April 2025.

== Programming ==
The legal programming mandate described in the editorial section an objective and comprehensive range of information for the general public from all relevant sectors for a broad target group, which should be sophisticated and balanced, but also entertaining and take into account the culture, independence and other characteristics of Liechtenstein. The programming principles corresponded to the public service's self-image.

The broadcaster aimed to broadcast an objective and comprehensive range of information for the general public for its news programming. News was broadcast every hour from 6 am to 7 pm, which can be listened to in the "Media Library" section on the station's website. There was also a new Radio Liechtenstein app available from the end of 2023 until the station's closure in 2025, replacing the original "Radio L" app.

The station also aimed to showcase Liechtensteiner culture, entertainment, music and other aspects of Liechtenstein. Its music style was described as "adult contemporary", with a mix of songs from the 1970s and 1980s. Radio Liechtenstein also liked to promote music from local artists and genres unique to the country, including songs in the German language.

== History ==
Former logo as Radio L

On 15 October 1938, a Radio Liechtenstein broadcast on 700 kHz medium wave from Vaduz. On 21 November 1938, the transmission mast collapsed as a result of a storm, which resulted in a transmission outage for several days. Although Lirag (German: Liechtensteinische Radio-Gesellschaft) was founded on 20 February 1939, the simple music program of Radio Liechtenstein was discontinued in September 1939 at the beginning of the Second World War due to financial difficulties, after the government had informed the population about the events and the measures to be taken.

On 15 August 1995, after a trial period starting in 1991, a station called Radio L began official broadcasting as a private radio station. Radio L was the first post-war radio station in Liechtenstein. When the broadcasting fee was abolished in January 1999, which until then had mainly financed the distribution of Swiss programs in Liechtenstein, the private station was one of the only providers, along with the local print media, of a public service for Liechtenstein. Since then, funding from the then newly designed state media funding has been available to pay for this public service mandate. They are supplemented by advertising and sponsorship.

After eight years and an investment of 12 million Swiss francs (12.3 million euros), private investor Peter Ritter withdrew from the radio station in 2003. According to figures from the Publica Data Institute, the station had more than 50,000 listeners at that time. Of these, an average of 37,200 were in German-speaking Switzerland alone, three times as many listeners as in Liechtenstein itself with 12,200.

After several negotiations with the government, Radio Liechtenstein was converted into a public broadcaster on 1 January 2004. 750,000 francs from the state budget were invested in the expansion and reconstruction of the broadcasting network, and line rental costs were saved by switching to ball reception. In this report in October 2005, the government stated that the station produced "a similar amount of information and spoken contributions" compared to Radio Rumantsch and Radio DRS with around 1/10 of public funding, which meant "about twice the information output per employee (full-time equivalent)". Nevertheless, further savings and efficiency improvements were planned in the following years.

In October 2013, the government applied for the restructuring of the national budget ("Package of Measures III"). The reintroduction of a broadcasting fee was intended to relieve the national budget by 1.5 million francs from 2015, but was rejected again in July 2015 because a broadcasting fee was not socially accepted and the state contribution had proven to be the most economical financing option. The government rejected an offer to buy the station from Media Holding AG in November 2013. This was justified not only by the low offer price, which the government believed was significantly below the current market value, but also by the loss of the statutory service mandate (" public service ") based on the Swiss model. In addition, the special status as a public broadcaster in Switzerland would have been lost. A loss of Swiss listeners would have resulted in a loss of income (probably particularly from advertising revenue). According to Publica Data, the station reached around 46,200 listeners daily in 2012, of whom 12,900 listeners (second semester) were in Liechtenstein. An increase was aimed for by expanding the digital broadcasting area, with which 40 percent of households in the eastern Swiss-Liechtenstein economic area could be reached.

In the second half of 2020, the station had more listeners in Switzerland for the first time, a result of the new content focusing "more [on] Liechtenstein" since 2019.

On 2 June 2024, Radio Liechtenstein announced that it was "in the process" of joining the European Broadcasting Union. The broadcaster had also stated its aims to participate in the Eurovision Song Contest 2025, which took place in Basel, Switzerland. However, this did not materialise and Liechtenstein did not appear on the official list of the participants released by the EBU on 12 December 2024. Had their application been approved, they would have been the first broadcaster from Liechtenstein to join the organisation, as its television broadcaster 1FLTV had retired plans to apply for EBU membership. It remains unclear whether Radio Liechtenstein would have been ineligible to participate as a radio-only broadcaster, considering all competing countries broadcast the live shows on television, despite some broadcasters also airing the contest on their own radio stations each year.

A proposal to privatise Radio Liechtenstein was proposed by the Democrats for Liechtenstein and received 1,729 valid signatures in favour of the privatisation on 2 August 2024. The subsequent referendum was accepted by voters, meaning that the station was set to be privatised. On 1 April 2025, it was announced that Radio Liechtenstein would be shut down following a lack of a concrete plan involving privatisation as well as no political decision regarding an extension of the deadline to do so. The station ceased its regular broadcasting on 3 April 2025, shortly after 18:00 CEST. The last song played in the live programme was the Queen classic "The Show Must Go On".

== Broadcast ==
Radio Liechtenstein was broadcast terrestrially via FM via six small transmitters in Liechtenstein with 0.025 to 1 kW (ERP) and two other small transmitters in Eastern Switzerland with 0.05 and 0.2 kW, although the allocation to the broadcasting areas on the station's homepage differed. The program was broadcast via DAB+ from 29 November 2013 until its closure on 3 April 2025 via Block 9D, which was converted to Block 9B by the beginning of 2017 and was built up with the aim of providing comprehensive coverage in Eastern Switzerland. The Rüthi/Bismer transmitter (4.3 kW) could also be received in Liechtenstein.

The station was also available in analogue form on the cable networks of Telecom Liechtenstein, UPC Switzerland and EWB Buchs, as well as digitally in Switzerland on Rii-Seez-Net and Swisscom TV.
