= 1FLTV =

- Country: Liechtenstein

Programming
- Language: German
- Picture format: 1080i HDTV

Ownership
- Owner: Beatrix Schartl

History
- Launched: 15 August 2008; 17 years ago

Links
- Website: www.1fl.li

1FLTV is Liechtenstein's first television broadcaster. It began operation on 15 August 2008 and broadcasts in German. Through cable networks, the channel is accessible to about 50,000 homes in Liechtenstein and a small portion of its neighboring Switzerland. Before the channel launched, people in Liechtenstein watched Austrian and Swiss TV channels instead.

== History ==
On 15 August 2008, 1FLTV began operation after being licensed by the Liechtenstein government under the leadership of businessman Peter Kölbel.

Liechtenstein showed interest in participating in the Eurovision Song Contest in 1969 and 1976. Despite this, it was not possible because at the time Liechtenstein did not have a television station based in that country. If 1FLTV becomes an active member of the European Broadcasting Union, then Liechtenstein may have its national representation in Eurovision. There are financial costs associated with EBU membership. On 9 August 2022, the managing director of 1FLTV, Sandra Woldt, announced that the company would no longer seek EBU membership and participation in the Eurovision Song Contest. Instead, they would concentrate on reporting in their own country. It was announced in 2024 that Radio Liechtenstein was applying for EBU membership instead, but as no radio-only broadcaster has become a participant in the Eurovision Song Contest, this would not necessarily have solved Liechtenstein's participation problem, even if Radio Liechtenstein had not ceased operating in 2025.

== See also ==
- List of television stations in Europe
