= Werner Kranz =

Liechtenstein engineer and politician (born 1965)

Member of the Landtag of Liechtenstein for Unterland
- In office 8 February 2009 – 3 February 2013

Personal details
- Born: 8 February 1965 (age 61) Eschen, Liechtenstein
- Party: Patriotic Union
- Spouse: Brigitte Saxer (m. 1989)
- Children: 3

Werner Kranz (born 8 February 1965) is an engineer and politician who served in the Landtag of Liechtenstein from 2009 to 2013.

== Life ==
Kranz was born on 8 February 1965 in Eschen as the son of Siegfried Kranz and Emma (née Brändle) as one of four children. He attended secondary school in the municipality before conducting a commercial apprenticeship as a machine mechanic at Hilti in Schaan; in 1990 he received a diploma in mechanical engineering in 1990, and in 1997 as a logistical and industrial engineer.

From 1985 to 1998 he worked at numerous positions at Hilti and Ivoclar in Schaan, and then head of production and logistics at Hoval in Vaduz from 1998 to 2003, and as of 2025 the head of the office for vocational training since 2003. As of 2025, he has been the Liechtenstein government's chairman of vocational training since 2003.

He was elected as member of the Landtag of Liechtenstein in 2009 as a member of the Patriotic Union (VU), and also a member of the Landtag's financial committee during this time. He was elected as a deputy member in the 2013 elections, where he served until 2017.

Kranz married Brigitte Saxer on 6 May 1989 and they have three children together. He lives in Nendeln.
