= 2024 Liechtenstein referendums =

- 21 January referendums

Mandatory photovoltaic panels
For	33.4%
Against	66.6%
Proposal rejected

Reform of energy efficiency standards
For	34.8%
Against	65.2%
Proposal rejected

Electronic health records opt-in
For	46.1%
Against	53.9%
Proposal rejected
- 25 February referendum

Direct election of the members of government
For	32%
Against	68%
Proposal rejected
- 16 June referendum

Building of a new state hospital
For	53.7%
Against	46.3%
Proposal accepted
- 22 September referendum

Joining the IMF
For	55.8%
Against	44.2%
Proposal accepted
- 27 October referendum

Privatizing Radio Liechtenstein
For	55.4%
Against	44.6%
Proposal accepted
- 1 December referendum

State pension scheme
For	52.6%
Against	47.4%
Proposal accepted

Maps
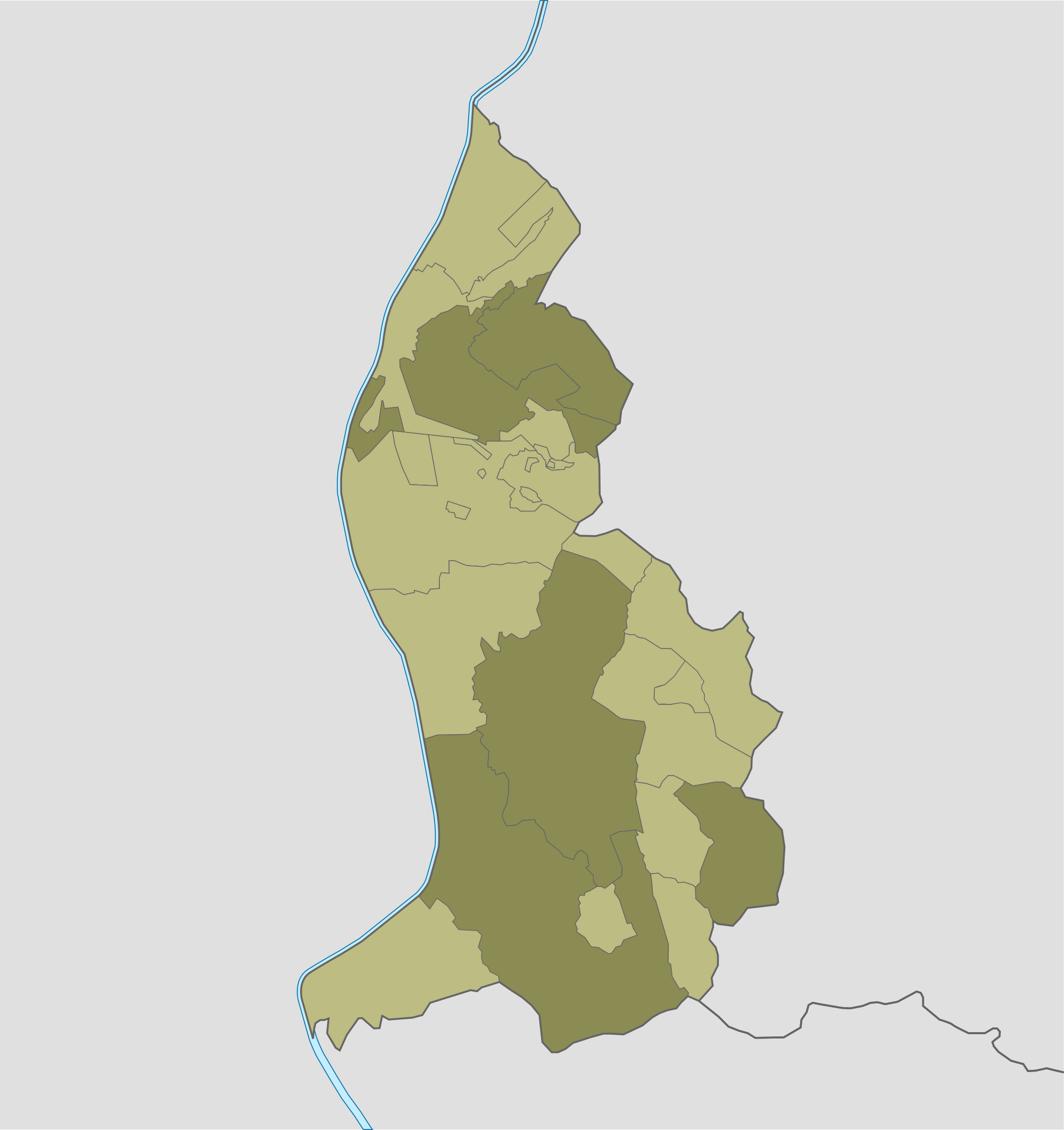
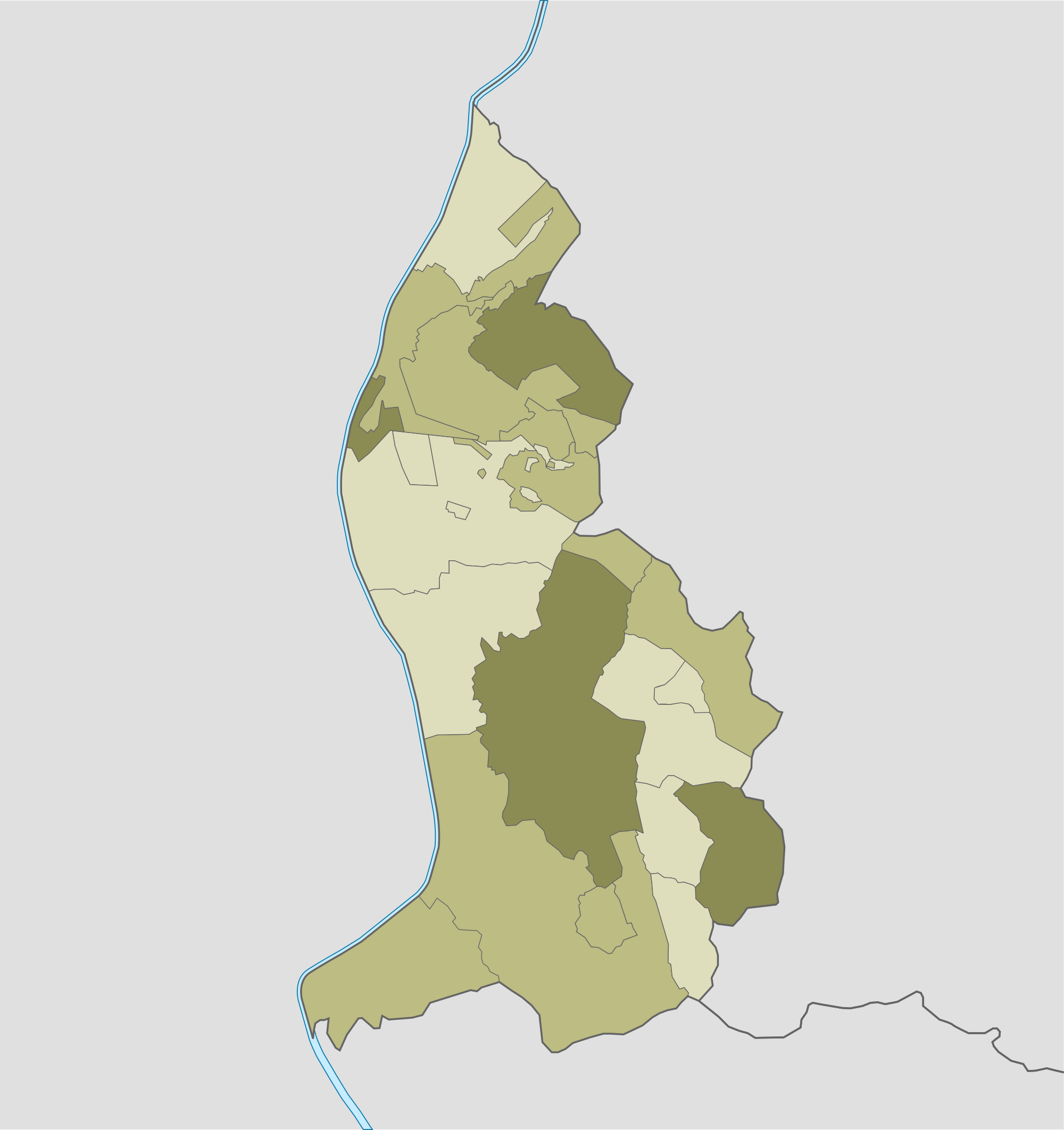
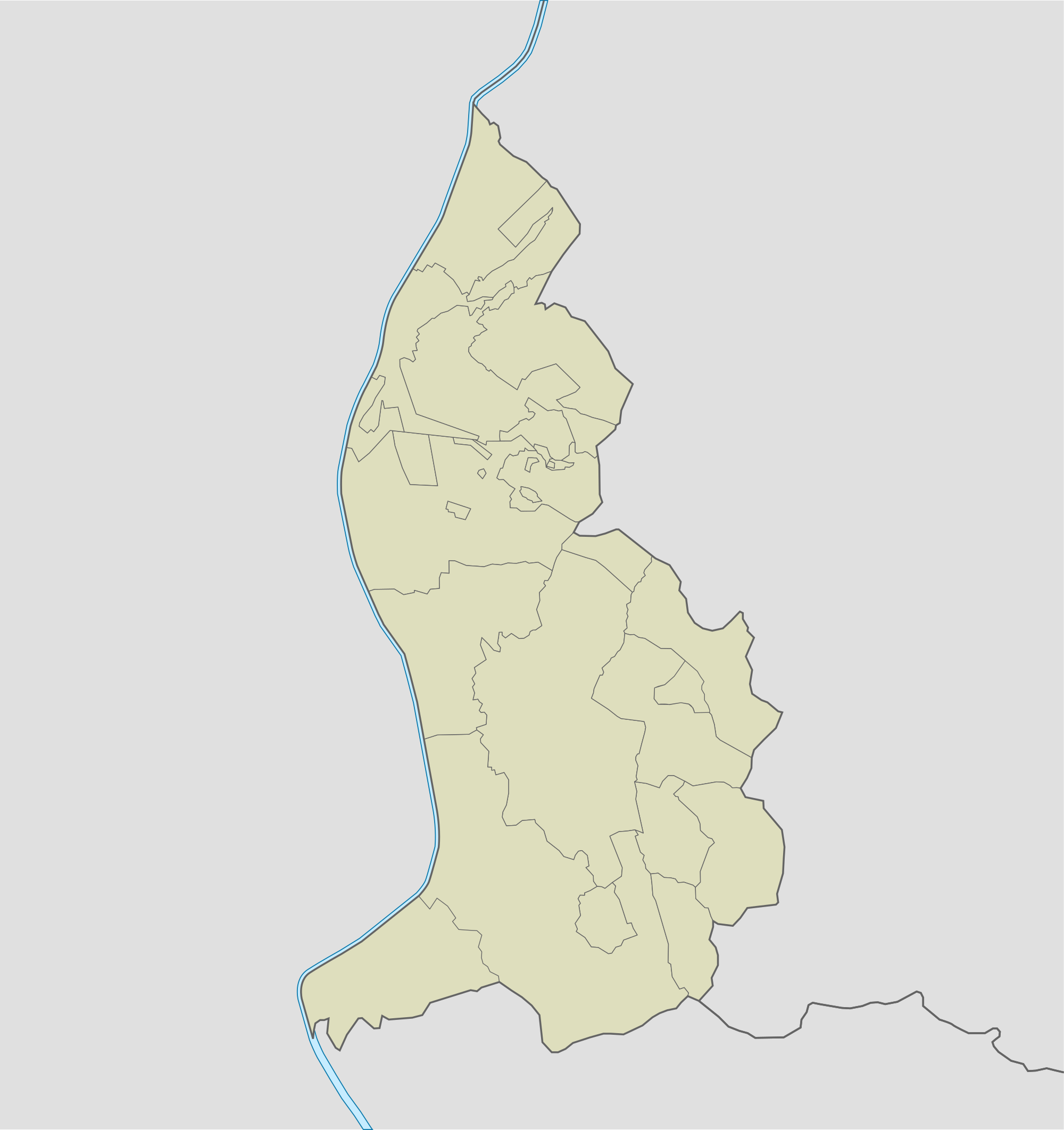
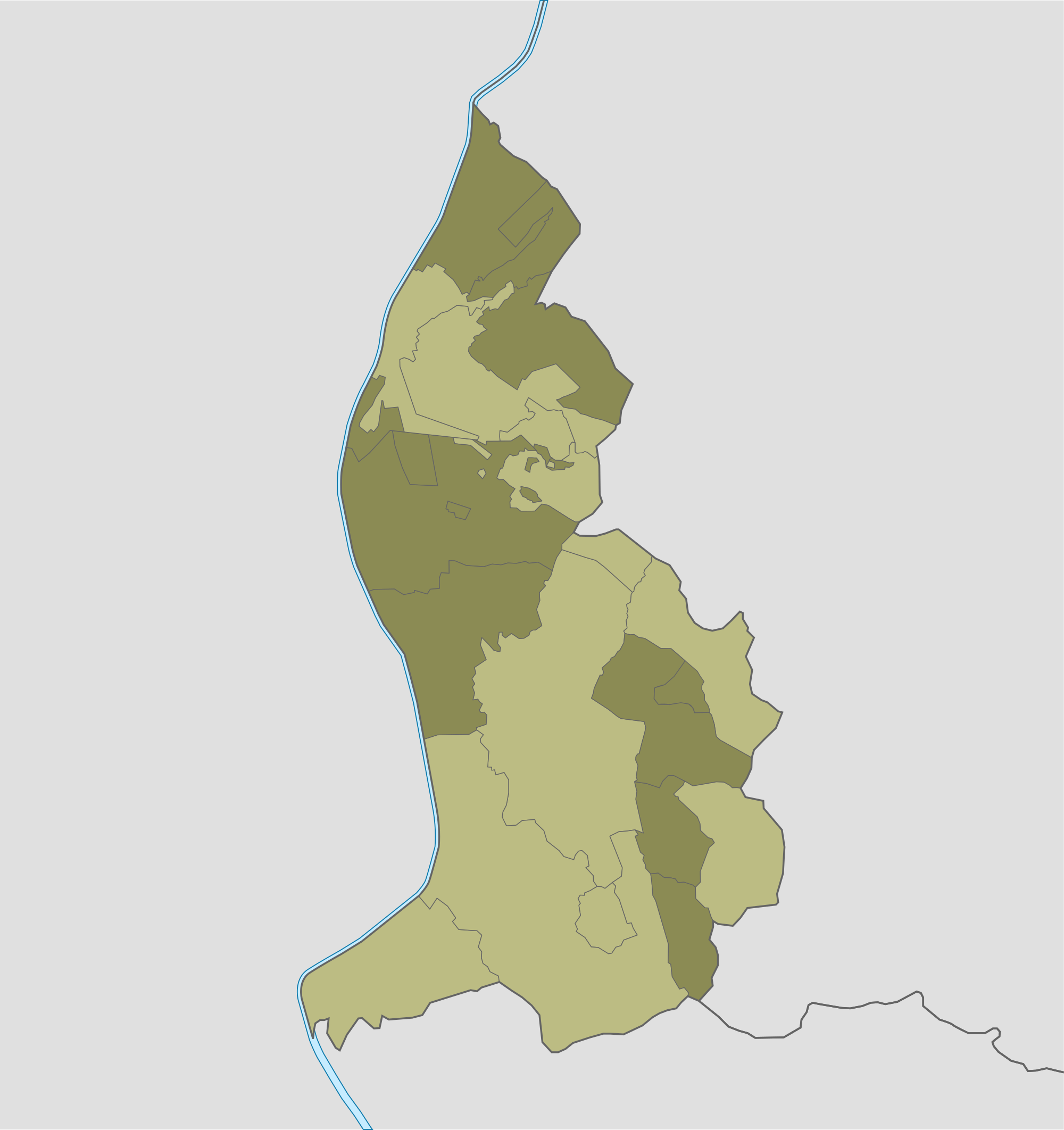
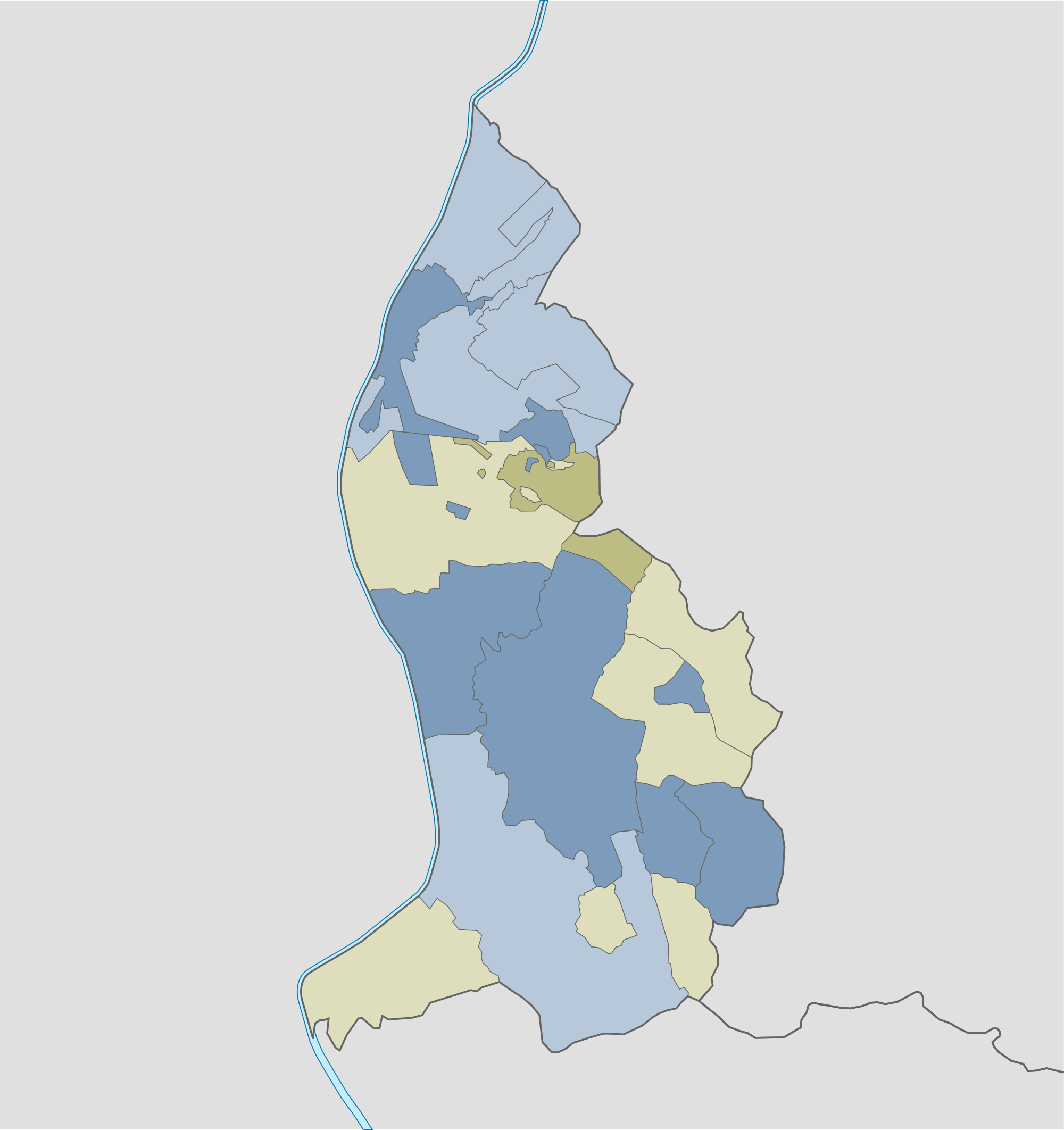
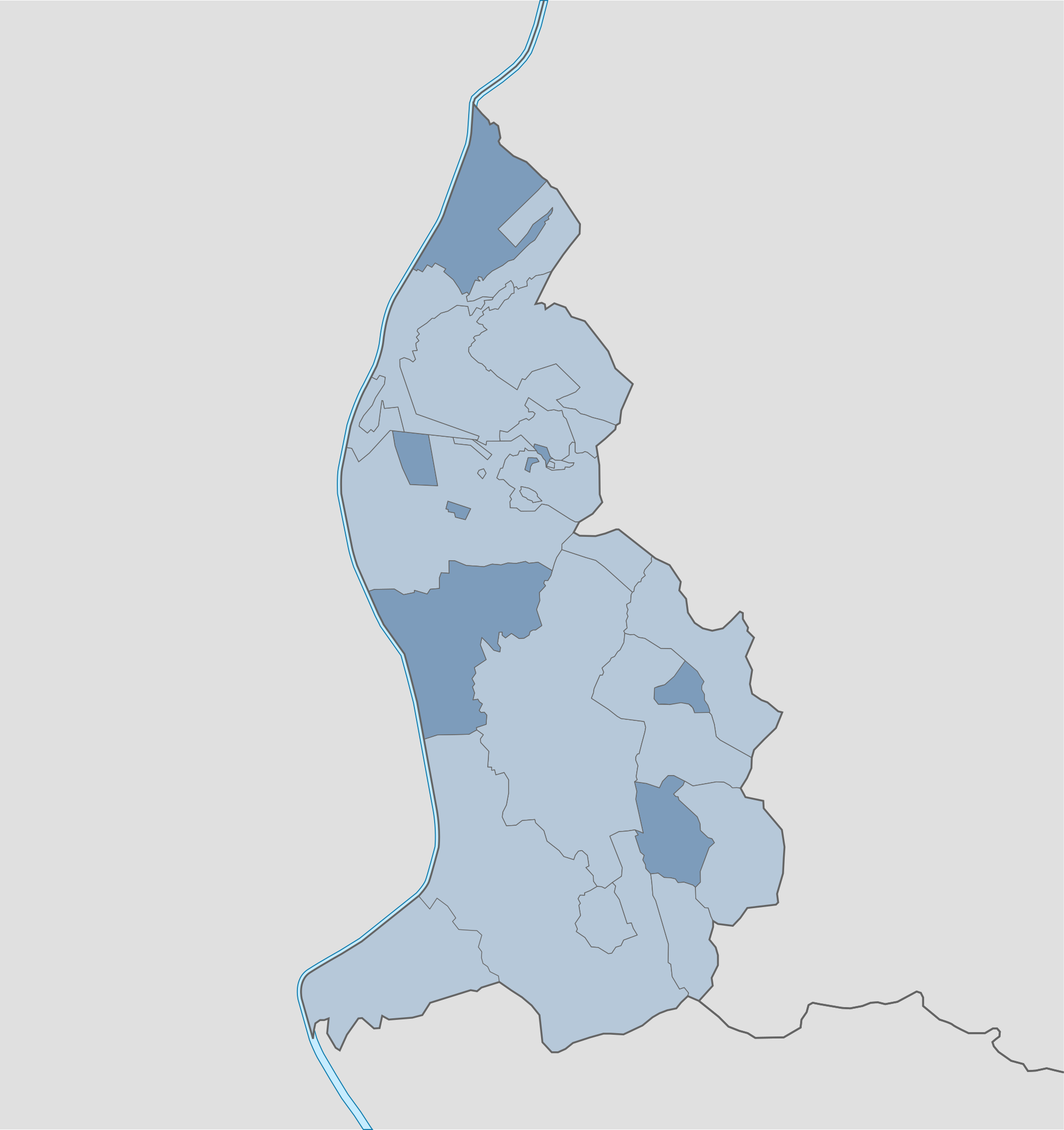
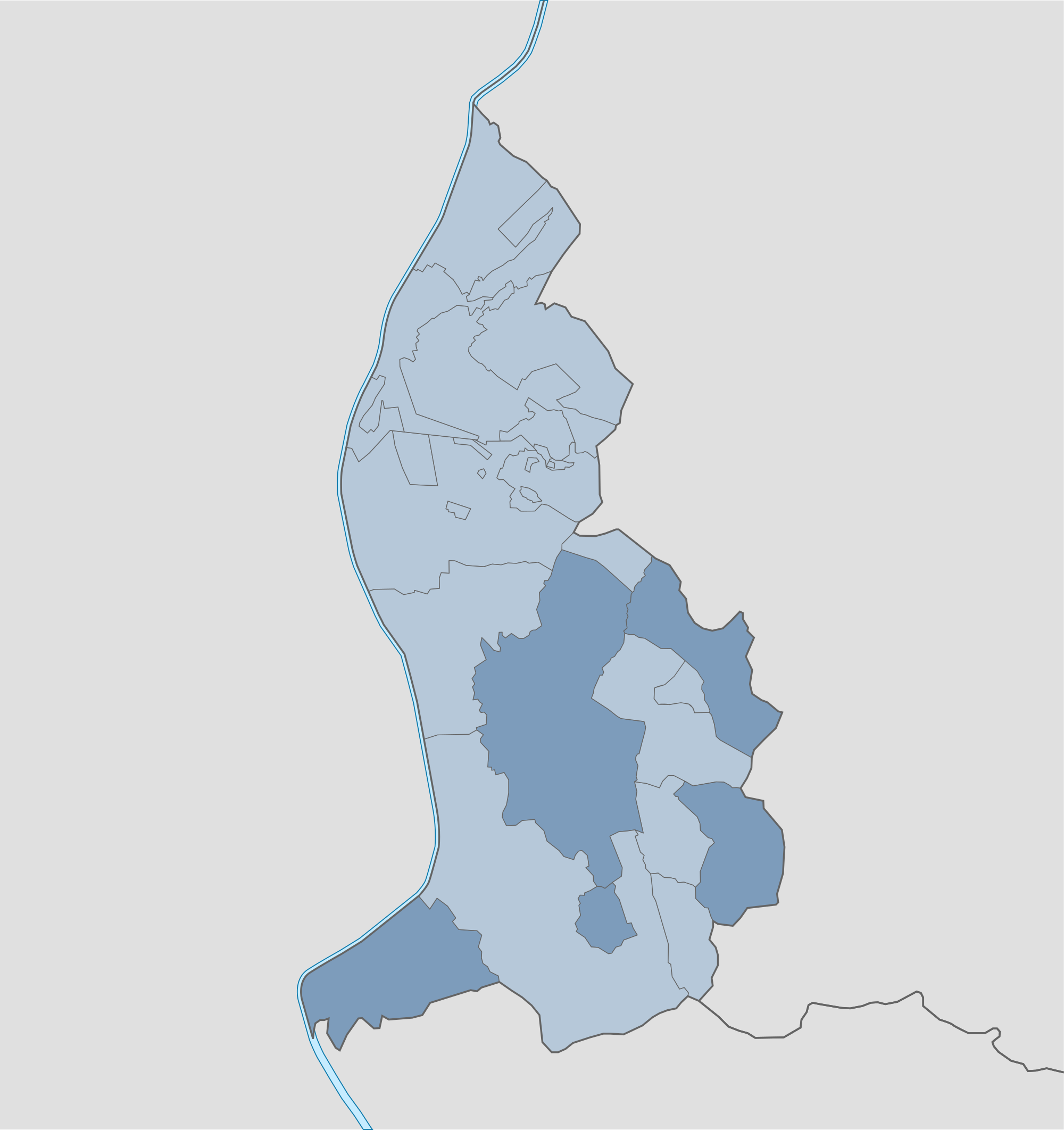
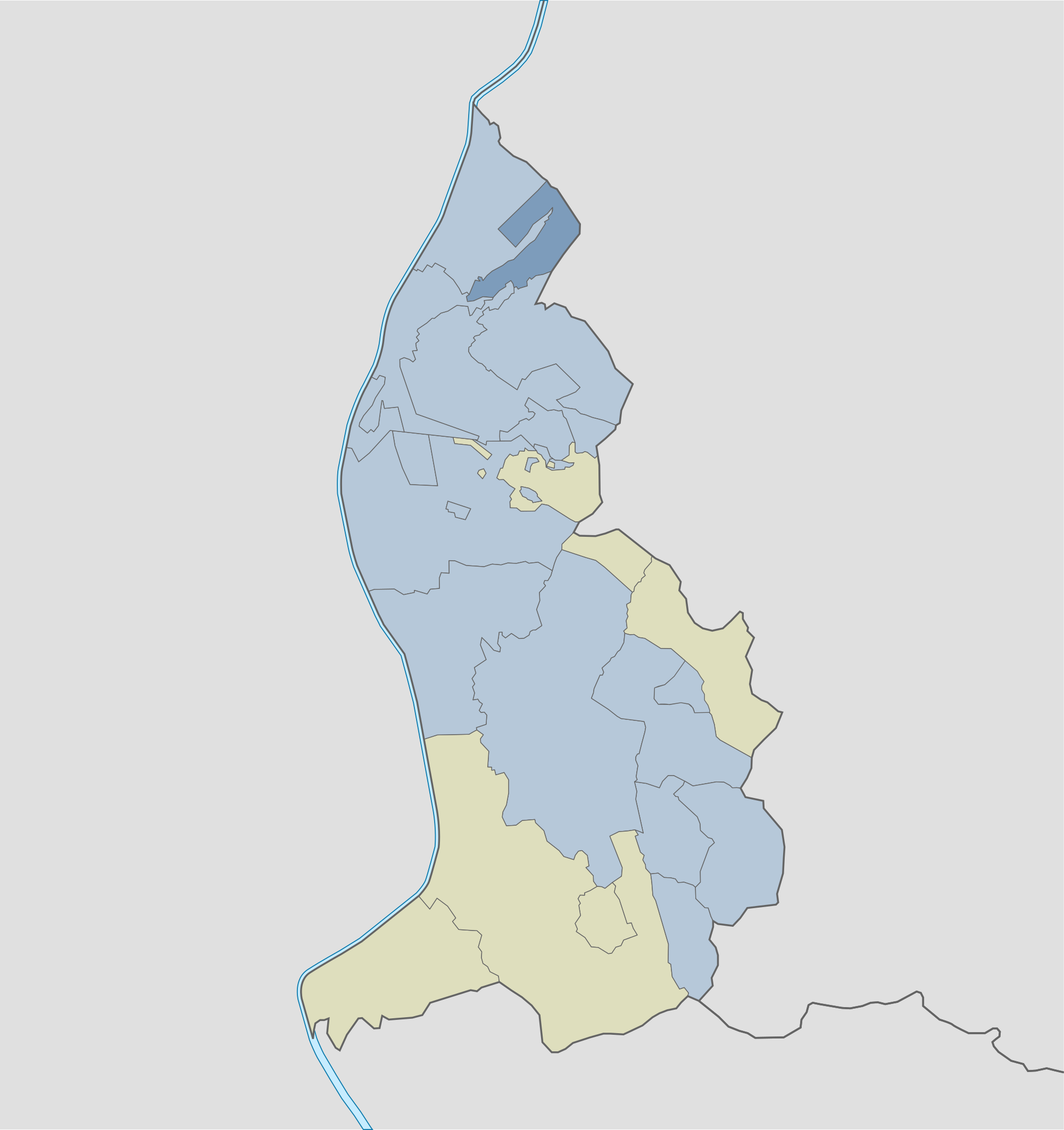
- Results by municipality Yes 50–60% 60–70% 70–80% 80–90% No 50–60% 60–70% 70–80% 80–90%

Eight referendums were held in Liechtenstein in 2024.

On 21 January 2024 voters were asked three questions: On introducing an obligation to install photovoltaic panels on non-residential buildings, on the reform of the energy standards in the building sector aimed at emulating those applied in Switzerland since 2014 and in the EU since 2010, as well as on stopping the automatic sending of electronic health records to health insurance beneficiaries. All three proposals were rejected by voters.

In addition, another referendum was held on 25 February 2024 with a question regarding direct elections of members of the government. The proposal was also rejected by voters. One further referendum was held on 16 June 2024 regarding the building of a new state hospital in Liechtenstein. The proposal was accepted by voters. Another referendum was held on 22 September 2024 regarding accession to the International Monetary Fund. The proposal was accepted by voters. Another referendum was held on 27 October 2024 regarding the privatization of Radio Liechtenstein. The proposal was accepted by voters.

== Topics and results ==
=== 21 January 2024 ===
==== Mandatory photovoltaic panels on non-residential buildings ====
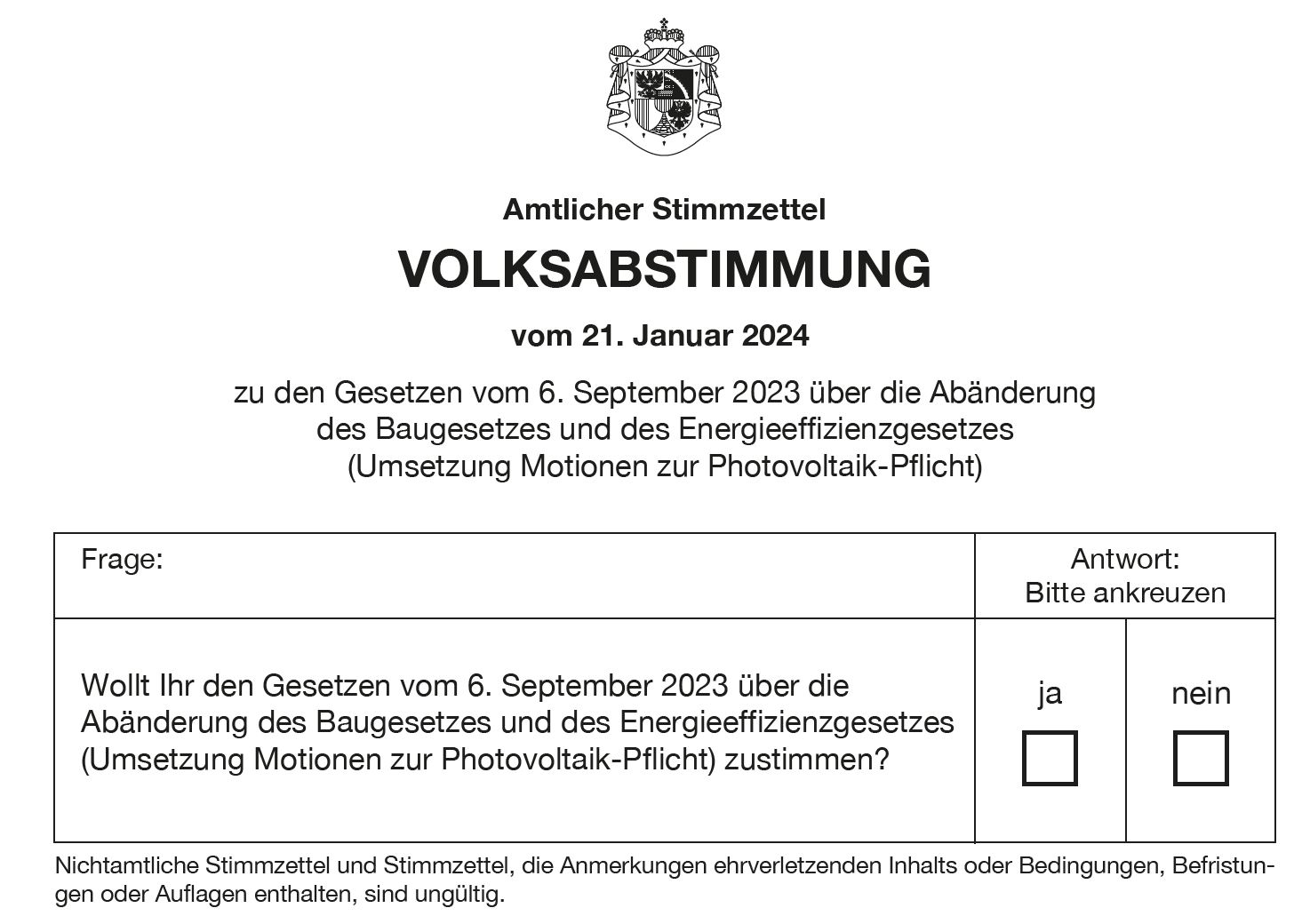
Ballot used

Mandatory photovoltaic panels on non-residential buildings
Choice	Votes	%
For	4,615	33.05
Against	9,350	66.95
Total	13,965	100.00
Valid votes	13,965	99.42
Invalid/blank votes	81	0.58
Total votes	14,046	100.00
Registered voters/turnout	20,950	67.05
Source: amtsblatt

==== Reform of energy efficiency standards ====
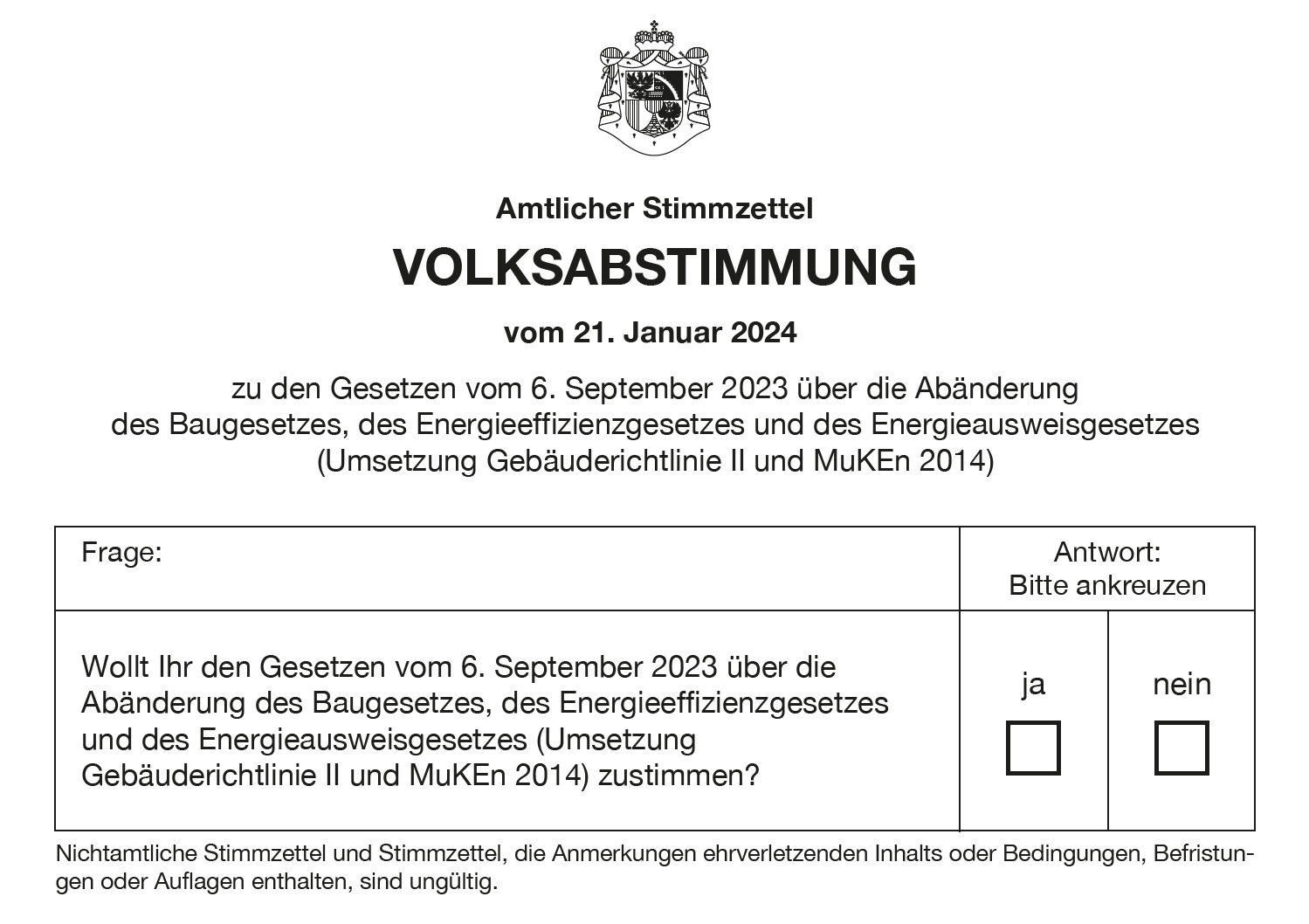
Ballot used

Choice	Votes	%
For	4,857	34.84
Against	9,083	65.16
Total	13,940	100.00
Valid votes	13,940	99.26
Invalid votes	91	0.65
Blank votes	13	0.09
Total votes	14,044	100.00
Registered voters/turnout	20,950	67.04
Source: amtsblatt

==== Electronic health records opt-in ====
Since 2023, all Liechtensteiner residents with health insurance receive an electronic health record, which contains medical history and treatments. The creation of a file containing personal health information regardless of a consent of the patient faced criticism.

In response, a signature campaign was launched by politicians of the Democrats for Liechtenstein to form a popular initiative. The aim was to change the creation of the electronic health record from automatic to only created for those who specifically consent to its creation, with it receiving 1,828 valid signatures. The Landtag of Liechtenstein rejected the proposal by a vote of 5 for and 20 against on 3 November 2023, thus making it a subject for referendum. The government called for the proposal to be rejected by voters.

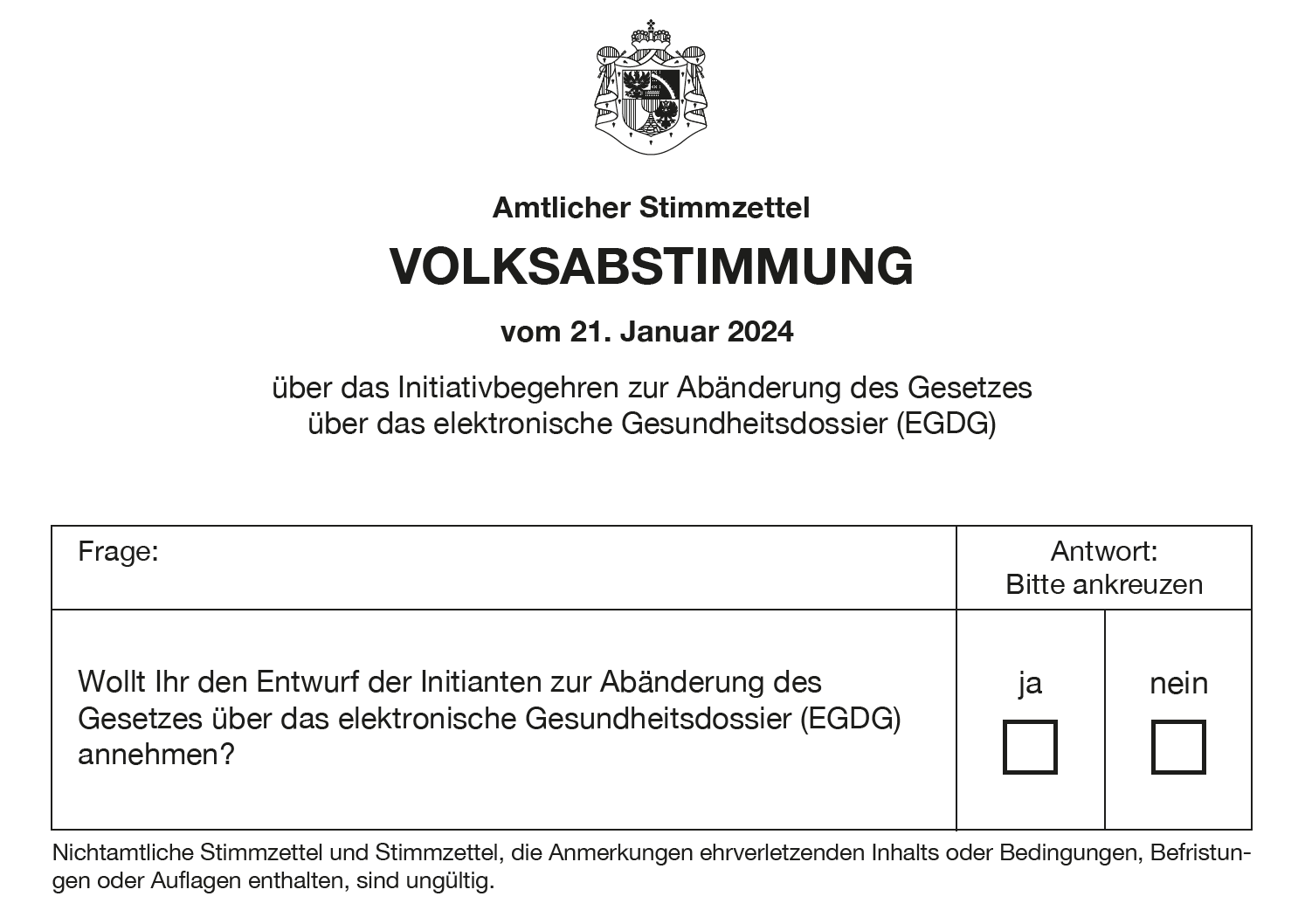
Ballot used

Choice	Votes	%
For	6,391	46.05
Against	7,486	53.95
Total	13,877	100.00
Valid votes	13,877	99.17
Invalid votes	105	0.75
Blank votes	11	0.08
Total votes	13,993	100.00
Registered voters/turnout	20,950	66.79
Source: amtsblatt

=== 25 February 2024 ===
==== Direct election of the members of government ====
Under the constitution of Liechtenstein, the Prime Minister of Liechtenstein and government is appointed by the sovereign prince of Liechtenstein in conjunction with the Landtag of Liechtenstein and is to command the confidence of both the prince and Landtag.

On 27 June 2023 the Democrats for Liechtenstein proposed a popular initiative for the constitution to be amended so the Prime Minister and government are directly elected. If the parties with the highest number of votes enter into a coalition agreement following the election, then five of the six nominated candidates will form the future government. If no coalition agreement is reached, the party with the highest vote must nominate two additional government ministers who are not already members.

The initiative received 1,994 valid signatures and was rejected by the Landtag by the vote of 3 for and 22 against on 5 December 2023, thus making it as a subject for referendum. The Patriotic Union came out against the proposal.

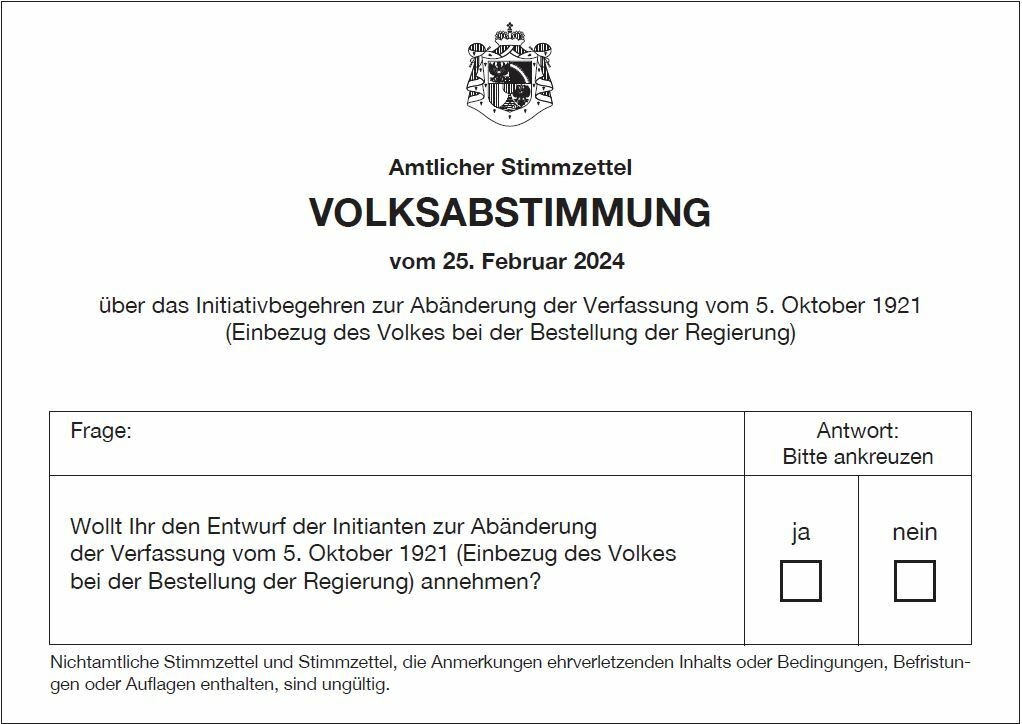
Ballot used

Choice	Votes	%
For	4,380	32.00
Against	9,309	68.00
Total	13,689	100.00
Valid votes	13,689	99.39
Invalid votes	57	0.41
Blank votes	27	0.20
Total votes	13,773	100.00
Registered voters/turnout	20,964	65.70
Source: sudd.ch

=== 16 June 2024 ===
==== Building of a new state hospital ====
A fifth referendum on the building of a new state hospital took place on 16 June 2024 that asked voters regarding the provision of 6 million Swiss francs towards the building of a new state hospital in Liechtenstein. The initiative received 1,692 valid signatures on 12 April 2024, thus making it a subject for referendum. The proposal was accepted by voters.

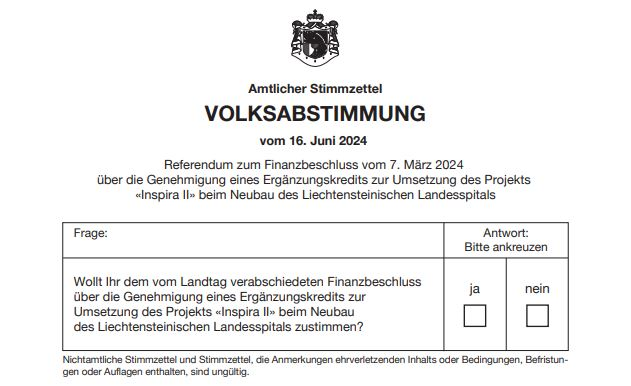
Ballot used

Choice	Votes	%
For	7,418	53.68
Against	6,402	46.32
Total	13,820	100.00
Valid votes	13,820	99.47
Invalid votes	60	0.43
Blank votes	14	0.10
Total votes	13,894	100.00
Registered voters/turnout	21,018	66.11
Source: amtsblatt

=== 22 September ===
==== Accession to the International Monetary Fund ====
A sixth referendum took take place on 22 September 2024 regarding Liechtenstein's accession to the International Monetary Fund. The accession received 2,743 valid signatures against it on 21 June 2024, thus making it a subject for referendum. The accession was supported by Alois, Hereditary Prince of Liechtenstein and prime minister Daniel Risch, whereas promiment opponents included Johannes Kaiser. The proposal was accepted by voters and Liechtenstein subsequently joined the IMF on 21 October.

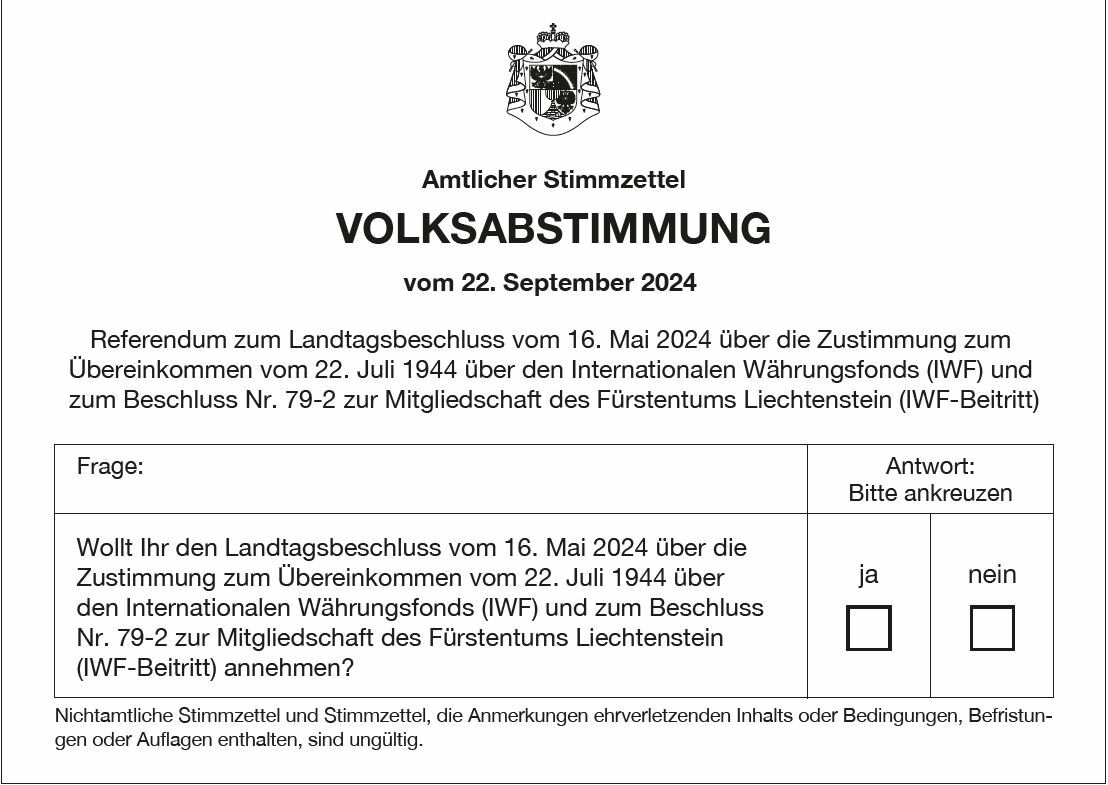
Ballot used

Choice	Votes	%
For	6,920	55.80
Against	5,481	44.20
Total	12,401	100.00
Valid votes	12,401	98.92
Invalid votes	119	0.95
Blank votes	16	0.13
Total votes	12,536	100.00
Registered voters/turnout	21,114	59.37
Source: amtsblatt

=== 27 October ===
==== Privatization of Radio Liechtenstein ====
A seventh referendum took place on 27 October 2024 regarding the privatization of Radio Liechtenstein, the state broadcasting radio station of Liechtenstein. The initiative was spearheaded by the Democrats for Liechtenstein and received 1,729 valid signatures in favour of the privatization on 2 August 2024. The Landtag rejected the proposal on 4 September, thus making it a subject for referendum. The proposal was supported by the Patriotic Union, but opposed by the Progressive Citizens' Party. The proposal was accepted by voters.

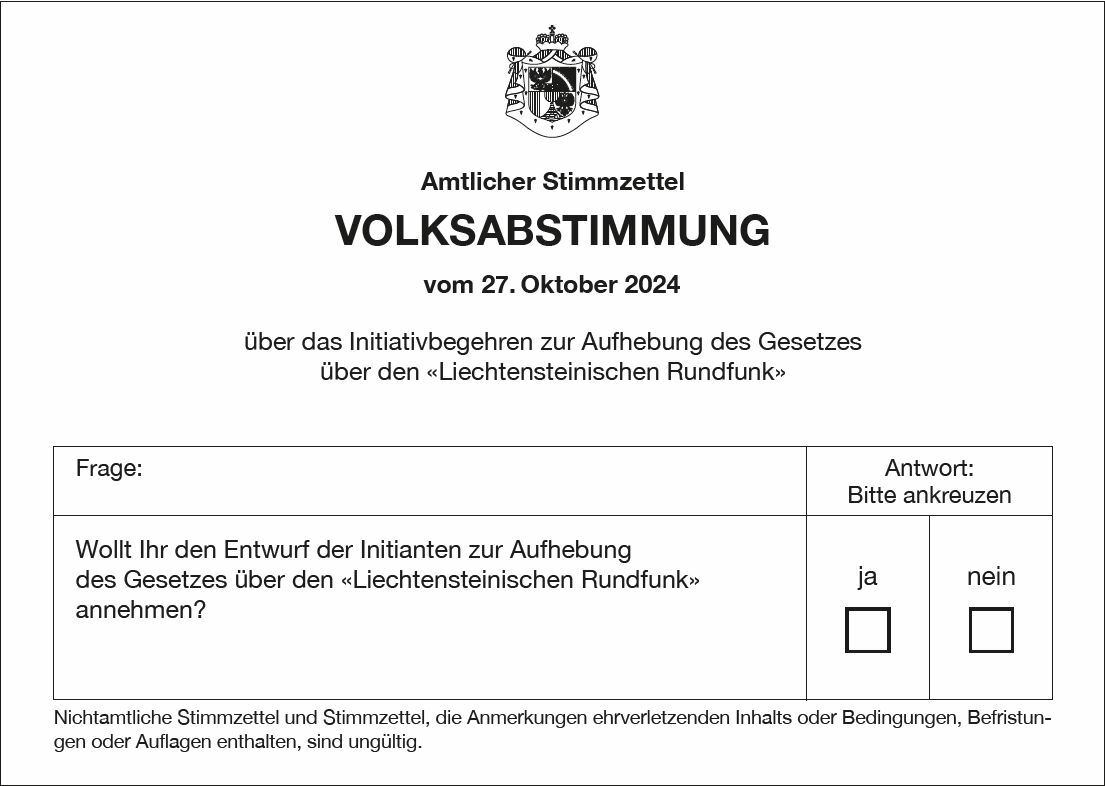
Ballot used

Choice	Votes	%
For	6,786	55.43
Against	5,457	44.57
Total	12,243	100.00
Valid votes	12,243	99.21
Invalid votes	72	0.58
Blank votes	25	0.20
Total votes	12,340	100.00
Registered voters/turnout	21,118	58.43
Source: amtsblatt

=== 1 December ===
==== State pension fund ====
An eighth referendum took place on 1 December 2024 regarding a package of measures proposed by the Liechtenstein Employee Pension Foundation (SPL), directed at a state pension fund. The proposal received 1,962 valid signatures on 11 October 2024, thus making it subject for referendum. The proposal was accepted by voters.

Choice	Votes	%
For	6,581	52.65
Against	5,919	47.35
Total	12,500	100.00
Valid votes	12,500	99.33
Invalid votes	69	0.55
Blank votes	15	0.12
Total votes	12,584	100.00
Registered voters/turnout	21,135	59.54
Source: abstimmungen
