= Christine Wohlwend =

Liechtensteiner businesswoman and politician (born 1978)

Member of the Landtag of Liechtenstein for Oberland
- In office 27 March 2013 – 29 March 2017

Personal details
- Born: 7 July 1978 (age 48) Feldkirch, Austria
- Party: Progressive Citizens' Party
- Spouse: Philipp Mittelberger (m. 2017)
- Education: University of Lausanne; HWZ

Christine Wohlwend (born 31 July 1978) is a Liechtensteiner businesswoman, forensic technician, and politician who served in the Landtag of Liechtenstein from 2013 until 2017. Wohlwend represented the Oberland constituency as a member of the Progressive Citizens' Party, and also served as the party's parliamentary group spokeswoman.

== Biography ==
=== Early life, education, and law enforcement career ===
Christine Wohlwend was born on 31 July 1978 in Feldkirch, Austria. Her father Helmut Wohlwend was a lawyer. At a young age, her family moved to the village of Balzers in Liechtenstein. Wohlwend grew up in Balzers, and later attended the Liechtenstein Gymnasium in Vaduz, where she graduated in 1998. Later that year, she began attending the University of Lausanne in Switzerland, graduating in 2002 with a degree in forensic science.

In 2002, Wohlwend began working at the Federal Criminal Police Office in Wiesbaden, Germany. She initially worked in the field of forensic technology, specifically ballistics and crime scene reconstruction. Among her duties, Wohlwend prepared a report for the 14th Interpol Forensic Science Symposium. She later switched her field to quality management and compliance, and left the police in 2007.

=== Business and political career ===
Wohlwend moved back to Liechtenstein in 2008, becoming the head of the business controlling and services department of Kyberna AG, an IT company in Vaduz. She was named to the company's executive board in 2011, and was "responsible for data protection and data location issues". In 2012, Wohlwend received a master's degree in controlling from the Zurich University of Economics. The following year, she co-founded a consulting firm in Balzers named Elleta AG. Wohlwend is the firm's managing director, focusing on "risk management, data protection, information security and compliance", and she sits on the company's board of directors. In 2020, she won the Business Day Award at the "13th Women's Business Day in Vaduz".

In the 2013 Liechtenstein general election, Wohlwend was elected to the Landtag of Liechtenstein, representing Oberland as a member of the Progressive Citizens' Party (FBP). Following her election, Wohlwend became the FBP's parliamentary group spokeswoman, thus becoming an ex officio member of the party's presidium. During her tenure in parliament, Wohlwend supported legislation which would give government employees the same protections against dismissal as private sector employees, "strengthen government oversight of public companies", and launch a "review of subsidies and transfer payments to private individuals". Wohlwend left office at the end of her term in 2017.

Since 2018, Wohlwend has been the president of the board of directors of Liechtensteiner Volksblatt AG, the managing company of Liechtensteiner Volksblatt, one of Liechtenstein's two daily newspapers. In February 2023, she announced that the newspaper would cease publication in March due to declining subscriptions and rising costs.
