= Eugen Nägele =

Liechtenstein teacher and politician (born 1964)

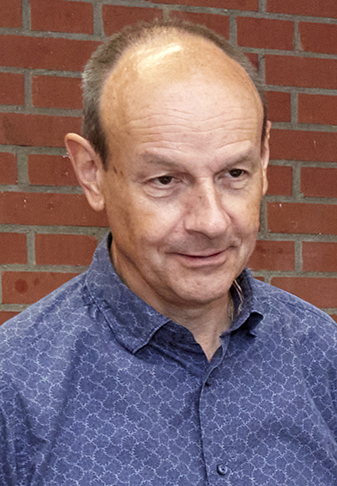
- Nägele in 2022

Member of the Landtag of Liechtenstein for Oberland
- In office 3 February 2013 – 7 February 2021

Personal details
- Born: 10 August 1964 (age 61) Vaduz, Liechtenstein
- Party: Progressive Citizens' Party
- Spouse: Claudia Hohenegger (m. 2000)
- Children: 2

Eugen Nägele (born 10 August 1964) is a teacher and politician from Liechtenstein who served in the Landtag of Liechtenstein from 2013 to 2021.

== Life ==
Nägele was born on 10 August 1964 in Vaduz as the son of mayor of Planken Anton Nägele and seamstress Hannelore (née Kaiser) as one of two children. He attended primary school in Planken, and then the Liechtensteinisches Gymnasium before studying English Literature, English Philology and French Literature at the University of Fribourg from 1985 to 1993, and received with a teaching diploma.

He worked as a secondary school teacher in Fribourg from 1992 to 1995. He has since been a teacher at the Liechtensteinisches Gymnasium, being its vice rector from 2000 to 2008, and its rector since 2008. He was the international representative of Scouts and Guides of Liechtenstein from 1987 to 1997.

Nägele was a member of the Schaan municipal council from 1999 to 2007 as a member of the Progressive Citizens' Party (FBP), and then a member of the Landtag of Liechtenstein from 2013 to 2021. During his time in the Landtag, he advocated for a law for protecting cultural assets and "Liechtenstein first" policies for state-owned companies, prioritizing Liechtenstein-based contractors as opposed to foreign ones. He also opposed the 2016 Family Allowances Act referendum, notably against the FBP's leadership. He did not seek re-election in the 2021 elections.

Nägele has been the president of the Schaan winegrowers association since its founding in 2004. He married Claudia Hohenegger on 9 September 2000 and they have two children together. He is from Planken, but now lives in Schaan.
