= List of political parties in Liechtenstein =

This article lists political parties in Liechtenstein. Liechtenstein has a two-party system where the two largest political parties—the Patriotic Union (VU) and the Progressive Citizens' Party (FBP)— dominate politics within the Landtag of Liechtenstein, frequently in coalition. There are currently two minor parties forming the opposition in the Landtag, Democrats for Liechtenstein (DpL) and the Free List (FL), and one minor party not represented in the Landtag, The Independents (DU).

== Current parties ==
Logo	Name	Abbr.	Ideology	Landtag	Mayors	Municipal Councils
	Patriotic Union; Vaterländische Union	VU	Christian democracy; Liberal conservatism; Economic liberalism; Constitutional monarchism	10 / 25	7 / 11	43 / 104
	Progressive Citizens' Party; Fortschrittliche Bürgerpartei	FBP	Conservatism; National conservatism; Economic liberalism; Monarchism	7 / 25	4 / 11	51 / 104
	Democrats for Liechtenstein; Demokraten pro Liechtenstein	DpL	National conservatism; Economic liberalism; Right-wing populism; Euroscepticism	6 / 25	0 / 11	5 / 104
	Free List; Freie Liste	FL	Social democracy; Green politics	2 / 25	0 / 11	5 / 104
	The Independents; Die Unabhängigen	DU	Right-wing populism; Euroscepticism; Anti-immigration	0 / 25	0 / 11	0 / 104
	People at the Center; Mensch im Mittelpunkt	MIM	Anti-COVID vaccine mandate	0 / 25	0 / 11	0 / 104

== Defunct parties ==
Logo	Name	Abbrev.	Ideology	Founded	Dissolved
	Non-Party List; Überparteiliche Liste Liechtenstein	ÜLL	–	1987	1999
	Christian Social Party of Liechtenstein; Christlich-Soziale Partei Liechtensteins	CSP	Christian democracy	1960	c. 1978
	List of Workers and Small Farmers; Liste der Unselbständig Erwerbenden und Kleinbauern	UEK	Labourism	1952	c. 1953
	Liechtenstein Loyalty Association; Heimattreue Vereinigung Liechtenstein	HVL	–	1939	c. 1945
	German National Movement in Liechtenstein; Volksdeutsche Bewegung in Liechtenstein	VDBL	Nazism	1938	1945
	Christian-Social People's Party; Christlich-Soziale Volkspartei	VP	Social liberalism	1918	1936; Merged with LHD to form Patriotic Union
	Liechtenstein Homeland Service; Liechtensteiner Heimatdienst	LHD	Corporate statism	1933	1936; Merged with VP to form Patriotic Union
	Liechtenstein Free Trade Association; Liechtensteinischer Freiwirtschaftsbund	–	Anti-capitalism	1931	1933

== See also ==
- Politics of Liechtenstein
- List of political parties by country
