= Liechtenstein Free Trade Association =

Defunct political party in Liechtenstein

Liechtenstein Free Trade Association Liechtensteinischer Freiwirtschaftsbund
- Leader: Hans Nescher (1931–1932); Josef Hilti (1932–1933)
- Founder: Hans Nescher
- Founded: 1931; 95 years ago
- Dissolved: 1933; 93 years ago
- Ideology: Freiwirtschaft; Anti-capitalism

The Liechtenstein Free Trade Association (German: Liechtensteinischer Freiwirtschaftsbund) was a political party in Liechtenstein active from 1931 to 1933 which advocated against capitalism and private ownership.

== History ==
The party was founded in 1931 with Hans Nescher and later Josef Hilti as chairman. It included members such as Jakob Sprenger and Johannes Ude. It was based on the economic philosophy of Silvio Gesell and it advocated against capitalism and private ownership. The party operated the newspaper Liechtensteinische Volkswirtschaftliche Zeitung, which was edited by Nescher.

In September 1932, a lecture by Johannes Ude was banned in Ruggell. Despite this, he had tried to give it again and was subsequently deported back to Austria. In December 1932, the party had attempted to introduce its own currency called the Wära, but it steadily lost its value and was banned the following month.

The party's only electoral success came in the 1933 local elections when it won a local mandate in Triesen. However, he retired in summer 1933 and the party effectively ceased to exist. Some of its followers later became involved in the Liechtenstein Homeland Service.
