= Herbert Elkuch =

Liechtenstein politician (born 1952)

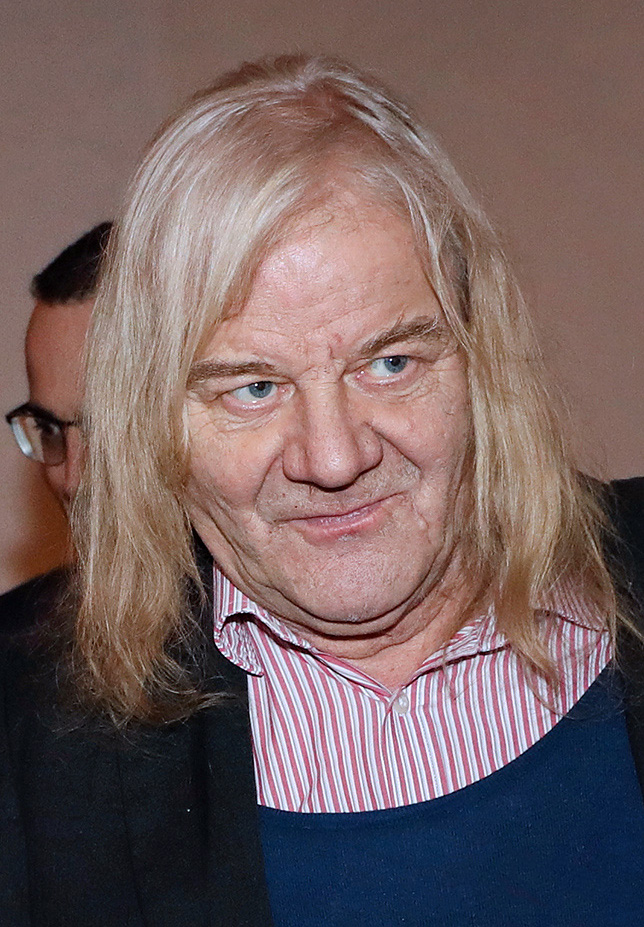
- Elkuch in 2023

Member of the Landtag of Liechtenstein for Unterland
- In office 3 February 2013 – 9 February 2025

Personal details
- Born: 30 December 1952 (age 73) Schellenberg, Liechtenstein
- Party: Democrats for Liechtenstein
- Other political affiliations: The Independents (2013–2018)
- Children: 3

Herbert Elkuch (born 30 December 1952) is an engineer and politician from Liechtenstein who served in the Landtag of Liechtenstein from 2013 to 2025.

== Life ==
He works as a mechanical engineer. In 1992, Elkuch founded and owns Elkuch Mechanik AG, a manufacturing company based in Eschen.

In 2013, he was elected to the Landtag of Liechtenstein as a member of The Independents (DU). Upon being elected he was noted by foreign media for cross-dressing, though he does not identify as LGBTQ.

In August 2018 Landtag member Erich Hasler was expelled from The Independents under controversial circumstances. Elkuch, along with Thomas Rehak, sided with Hasler and left the party. The following month, the three men founded the Democrats for Liechtenstein (DpL); in the 2021 election he was re-elected to the Landtag as a member of the party in his own right. He did not seek re-election in the 2025 elections.

As a member of the DU and later DpL, Elkuch opposed the 2016 Family Allowances Act referendum and the building of an S-Bahn in 2020. He campaigned for the direct election of government members in 2024; however, the subsequent referendum was rejected by voters.

Elkuch is widowed and has three children.
