= Mauro Pedrazzini =

Liechtensteiner politician (born 1965)

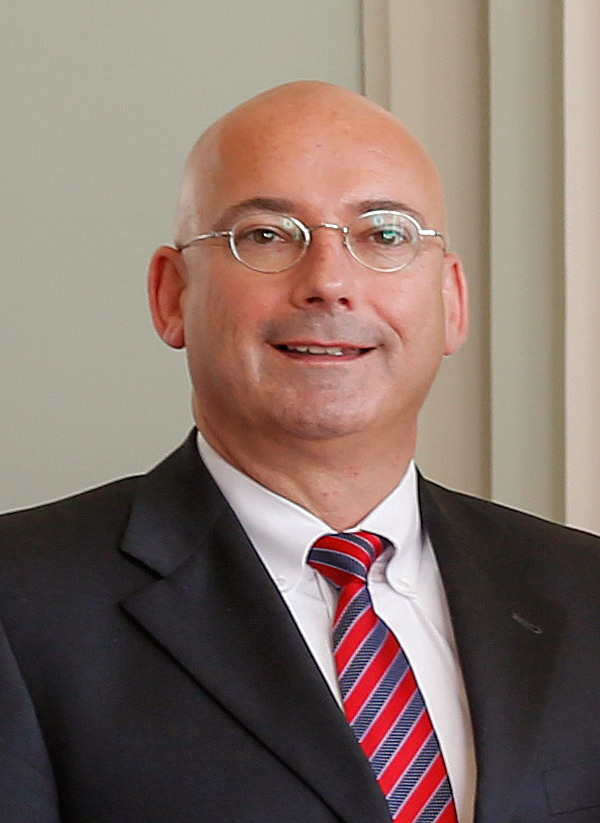
- Pedrazzini in 2017

Minister of Social Affairs
- In office 27 March 2013 – 30 March 2021
- Monarch: Alois (Regent)
- Prime Minister: Adrian Hasler

Personal details
- Born: 15 June 1965 (age 61)
- Party: Progressive Citizens' Party

Mauro Pedrazzini (born 15 June 1965) is a politician from Liechtenstein who served as Minister of Social Affairs in the Government of the Principality of Liechtenstein from 2013 to 2021.

Pedrazzini has a PhD in physics and lives in Eschen.

== Career ==
Mauro Pedrazzini received his Matura, the general qualification for university entrance, in 1985 at the Liechtenstein grammar school in Vaduz. Subsequently he started studying physics, chemistry and astronomy at the University of Bern in Switzerland. There he was employed as a research assistant at the Laboratory for High Energy Physics. He earned his PhD in physics in 1996 at the Center for Research in Plasma Physics of the École Polytechnique Fédérale de Lausanne. From 1992 until 2001 he was also employed in various positions at the Balzers AG, including the positions of a project manager, head of engineering and head of the department for research and development. At the same time Pedrazzini successfully completed an executive master study of economics at the University of St. Gallen.

From 2001 until his appointment as a member of the government in 2013 he worked as a financial analyst and fund manager at the National bank of Liechtenstein. From 2003 on he was employed at the subcompany LLB Asset Management AG, where he was head of equity management from 2006 on.

In the legislative period from 2005 to 2009 Mauro Pedrazzini was alternate minister for the prime minister, Otmar Hasler, from 2009 to 2013 alternate minister for deputy prime minister Martin Meyer. After the 2013 parliamentary election, Pedrazzini was appointed to serve under the new government Prime Minister Adrian Hasler as head of the Ministry of social affairs, which includes the portfolios for social affairs, health care, family and equality of opportunities.
