= Harry Quaderer =

Liechtensteiner politician

Member of the Landtag of Liechtenstein for Oberland
- In office 13 March 2005 – 7 February 2021

Personal details
- Born: Harald Quaderer; 7 September 1959 (age 66) Vaduz, Liechtenstein
- Party: The Independents (2013-present)
- Other political affiliations: Patriotic Union (2005–2013)
- Children: 3

Harald 'Harry' Quaderer (born September 7, 1959) is a politician from Liechtenstein, the founder and leader of The Independents from 2013 to 2021, and a former member of the Landtag of Liechtenstein representing Oberland.

== Early life and education ==
Born in the hospital in Vaduz, Quaderer is the son of Jakob, a bank employee, and Helen, née Alexander. He grew up in Schaan and attended the Realschule in Vaduz.

== Career ==
=== Banking ===
From 1976 to 1979, he pursued a banking apprenticeship at the Liechtensteinische Landesbank in Vaduz. Between 1980 and 1999 he trained and then worked as a forex trader in banks in Geneva, New York, and London. After these nearly twenty years abroad, he returned to Liechtenstein and, with two partners, founded Multinova Treuhand AG in Schaan. From 1999 to 2007 he served as a member of the Board of Directors and Managing Director of that firm. From 2007 to 2014 he was associated with Jeeves AG in Schaan; since 2014 he has been Managing Director and a member of the Administrative Board of Baobab AG in Vaduz. Since mid-2007 he has also been Managing Director of Mercia Securities, an asset management company in Schaan.

=== Politics ===
Quaderer was first elected to the Landtag in the 2005 general election as a candidate for the Patriotic Union. He left that party in 2011, and until 2013 was a non-party member of the Landtag. From 2005 to 2011 he was a member of the Foreign Affairs Commission; since 2009 he has been a member of the delegation of the Parliamentary Committee of the EFTA and EFA States; from 2009 to 2013, he was the head of that delegation.

In 2012, he founded a list (later a full-fledged party) called The Independents (DU) and along with three other DU members was elected to the Landtag in the 2013 election.

When he ran for re-election in 2017 he wrote in a candidacy statement that “With the founding of the independents, a political dream has come true for me. The fact that the independents achieved four mandates at their first participation in a state election is actually still something incredible for me….I think we have left a mark on Liechtenstein politics. The independents are close to the people and I dare say that we are the only party that really has an ear to the people.” He rejected the views of critics who have dismissed DU as “populists.” DU won five seats in the 2017 elections, and from then until 2018 he was a member of the Landtag presidium. After three other DU deputies Erich Hasler, Thomas Rehak, and Herbert Elkuch, left DU in August 2018, reducing DU to two MPs, Quaderer resigned from the presidium.

== Personal life ==
Quaderer married his wife, Jacqueline (Jackie) Swaby (born 9 February 1957), on 23 August 1986. They have three grown children.
