= Violanda Lanter =

Liechtenstein lawyer and politician (born 1964)

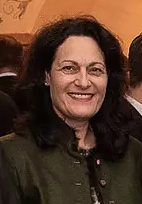
- Lanter in 2019

Member of the Landtag of Liechtenstein for Unterland
- In office 3 February 2013 – 7 February 2021

Personal details
- Born: 1 January 1964 (age 62) Sissach, Switzerland
- Party: Patriotic Union
- Spouse(s): Paul Koller (m. 1995, divorced) Hagen Pöhnert (m. 2018)
- Children: 2

Violanda Lanter (formerly Violanda Lanter-Koller; born 1 January 1964) is a lawyer and politician Liechtenstein who served in the Landtag of Liechtenstein from 2013 to 2021. A member of the Patriotic Union (VU), she served as the party's spokeswoman in the Landtag from 2017 to 2018, previously serving as Vice president of the Landtag from 2013 to 2017.

== Life ==
Lanter was born on 1 January 1964 in Sissach as the daughter of entrepreneur Rudolf Lanter and Isolde (née Büchel) as one of four children. She attended grammar school Vaduz before studying law at the University of St. Gallen from 1984 to 1990; she completed legal traineeships in Rorschach and St. Gallen before being admitted to the St. Gallen bar in 1993. From 1994 to 1996 she worked as a lawyer in Vaduz, and then was the head of the legal department of LGT Treuhand in Vaduz from 1996 to 2000. She was the chair of the board of directors at Liechtensteinische Kraftwerke from 2000 to 2004.

Lanter-Koller was a member of the Ruggell municipal council from 1999 to 2003 as a member of the Patriotic Union (VU), and then a legal advisor to Klaus Tschütscher from 2005 to 2011. In 2013, she was elected as a member of the Landtag of Liechtenstein as a member of the Patriotic Union (VU). During this time, she was the vice president of the Landtag from 2013 to 2017 and the VU's spokeswoman in the Landtag from 2017 to 2018, the latter role she acted in a provisional manner; she was the party's designated nominee to serve as the President of the Landtag should the party have won the 2017 elections.

In addition Lanter supported, among other things, the changing of the ownership strategies of the Liechtensteinische Kraftwerke and Liechtenstein Gas Supply, and an amendment to the social social assistance law to clarify regarding people being placed in institutions or psychiatric clinics unwillingly. She did not seek re-election to the Landtag in the 2021 elections, and then served as a deputy government councillor to Dominique Hasler from 2021 to 2025.

Lanter married Paul Koller on 9 June 1995 and they had two children together, but they got divorced at an unspecified time. She then went on to marry Hagen Pöhnert, an electrical engineer, on 10 October 2018. She lives in Ruggell.
