= Manfred Batliner =

Liechtenstein businessman and politician (born 1963)

Member of the Landtag of Liechtenstein for Unterland
- In office 8 February 2009 – 5 February 2017

Personal details
- Born: 1 October 1963 (age 63) Grabs, Switzerland
- Party: Progressive Citizens' Party
- Spouse: Ruth Buschor
- Children: 2

Manfred Batliner (born 1 October 1963) is a businessman and politician from Liechtenstein who served in the Landtag of Liechtenstein from 2009 to 2017.

== Life ==
Batliner was born on 1 October 1963 in Grabs as the son of architect Ewald Batliner and Ottilie (née Eisenring) as one of four children. He attended secondary school in Eschen before attending from traffic school in St. Gallen from 1980 to 1982, and then conducting an apprenticeship as a business secretary in Vaduz and St. Margrethen; he became a manager of business innovation in 1999.

He worked at Swiss Post from 1985 to 1986 before working as the association secretary at the Liechtenstein Chamber of Industry and Commerce (LIHK) from 1986 to 1992, and then as its managing director from 1993 to 2000. Since 2000, he has owned UnternehmerZentrum Treuhand-Anstalt in Eschen, an accounting and business consulting company. He was president of the organizing committee of LGT Group.

Batliner was the vice president of the Progressive Citizens' Party (FBP) from 2006 to 2009. He was a member of the Landtag of Liechtenstein from 2009 to 2017 as a member of the FBP; he was also a member of the Landtag's audit committee from 2009 to 2013 and then the judicial selection committee from 2013 to 2017. In 2015, he proposed a motion in the Landtag to reduce a proposed loan to Liechtensteinische Post from 6.12 million CHF to 4.59 million, which was rejected only receiving three votes in favour. He did not seek re-election to the Landtag in the 2017 elections.

Batliner married Ruth Buschor and they have two children. He lives in Eschen.
