= Peter Büchel (politician, born 1958) =

Liechtenstein politician (born 1958)

Member of the Landtag of Liechtenstein for Unterland
- In office 8 February 2009 – 5 February 2017

Personal details
- Born: 2 August 1958 (age 67) Feldkirch, Austria
- Party: Patriotic Union
- Spouse: Elisabeth Bürzle
- Children: 4

Peter Büchel (born 2 August 1958) is a politician from Liechtenstein who served in the Landtag of Liechtenstein from 2009 to 2017.

== Life ==
Büchel was born on 2 August 1958 in Feldkirch, Vorarlberg as the son of Urban Büchel and Karolina (née) Summer as one of four children. He attended secondary school in Eschen before conducting an apprenticeship as a radio technician and attending business school in Buchs, receiving a post-graduate diploma in industrial engineering. He has worked at Hilti.

Büchel was a member of the Landtag of Liechtenstein from 2009 to 2017 as a member of the Patriotic Union (VU); during this time, he Landtag's business audit committee. In 2014 Büchel, alongside fellow members Christoph Beck, Judith Oehri, and Karin Rüdisser-Quaderer submitted a proposal to the Landtag to raise minimum income tax from 1200 to 2000 Swiss franc, but the proposal was ultimately rejected. Büchel did not seek re-election in the 2017 elections.

Büchel is married to Elisabeth Bürzle and they have four children together. He is from Schellenberg.
