= Erich Hasler =

Liechtenstein politician (born 1956)

Member of the Landtag of Liechtenstein for Unterland
- Incumbent
- Assumed office 9 February 2025
- In office 3 February 2013 – 7 February 2021

Personal details
- Born: 28 December 1956 (age 69) Eschen, Liechtenstein
- Party: Democrats for Liechtenstein
- Other political affiliations: The Independents (2013–2018)
- Spouse: Verena Stalder (m. 1984)
- Children: 2

Erich Hasler (born 28 December 1956) is a lawyer and politician from Liechtenstein who has served in the Landtag of Liechtenstein since 2025, having previously served from 2013 to 2021.

== Life ==
Hasler was born 28 December 1956 as the son of Alois Hasler and Sofia Paulina (née Marxer) as one of five children. He attended high school in Feldkirch and from 1976 he studied chemistry at the University of Basel, where he obtained a licentiate in 1980 and later a doctorate in 1994. From 1986 to 1989 he worked as an engineer and product manager at Balzers AG. In 1990 he was admitted as a Liechtenstein patent attorney, and in 1996 as a European patent attorney. Since 1999 he has been a partner at the Riederer, Hasler & Partner law firm in Eschen, Bad Ragaz and St. Gallen.

He was a member of the Landtag of Liechtenstein from 2013 to 2021, initially as a member of The Independents. On 16 August 2018, Hasler was expelled from The Independents due to disagreements with party leader Harry Quaderer regarding party organization and membership. Fellow Landtag members, Herbert Elkuch and Thomas Rehak sided with Hasler and left the party. The following month, the three men founded the Democrats for Liechtenstein.

Hasler was a deputy member of the Landtag as a member of the party from 2021 to 2025. He was re-elected as a full member of the Landtag in 2025. In this election, the party nominated him as a government candidate on 16 December 2024, being the first time the party has presented government candidates since its formation.

Hasler married Verena Stalder on 30 June 1984 and they have two children together.
