= 2016 Liechtenstein Family Allowances Act referendum =

2016 Liechtenstein Family Allowances Act Referendum
- 18 September 2016
- Referendum on Amendments to the Family Allowances Act

Results
Choice	Votes	%
Yes	2,099	17.61%
No	9,823	82.39%
Valid votes	11,922	98.99%
Invalid or blank votes	122	1.01%
Total votes	12,044	100.00%
Registered voters/turnout	19,765	60.94%
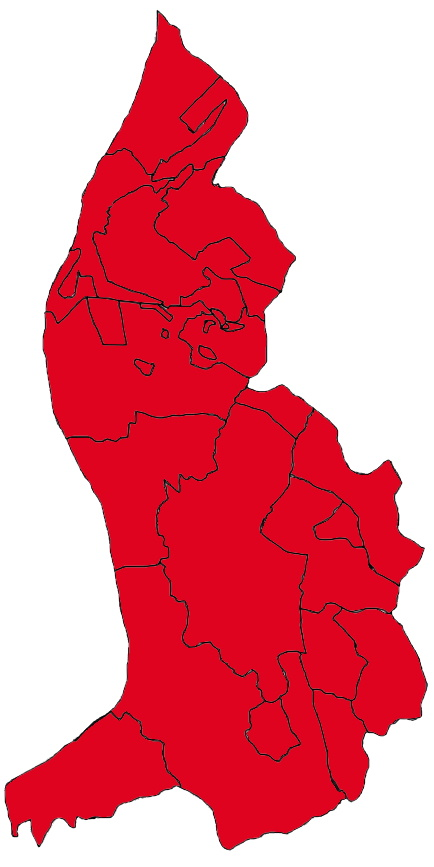
- Results by municipality

A referendum on amendments to the Family Allowances Act was held in Liechtenstein on 18 September 2016. The amendments were rejected by 82% of voters.

== Background ==
The amendments to the Family Allowances Act would introduce paid maternity leave for 20 weeks, financed by companies, although they would not have to pay the health insurance during this period. They would also introduce daily rates for child care centres.

A referendum was forced after the Chamber of Commerce collected 1,179 signatures between 8 April and 11 May 2016. After validation, 1,144 were deemed valid, meeting the requirement of article 64 of the constitution for at least 1,000 signatures.

The Landtag approved the holding of a referendum on 9 June by a vote of 13–12, making a referendum optional rather than compulsory. A second vote on an amendment by the Progressive Citizens' Party passing by 19 votes to six nonetheless agree on organising the referendum. The government set the date of the referendum on 14 June.

== Results ==
Choice	Votes	%
For	2,099	17.61
Against	9,823	82.39
Total	11,922	100.00
Valid votes	11,922	98.99
Invalid votes	109	0.91
Blank votes	13	0.11
Total votes	12,044	100.00
Registered voters/turnout	19,765	60.94
Source: Government of Liechtenstein
