= Thomas Rehak =

Liechtensteiner politician (born 1971)

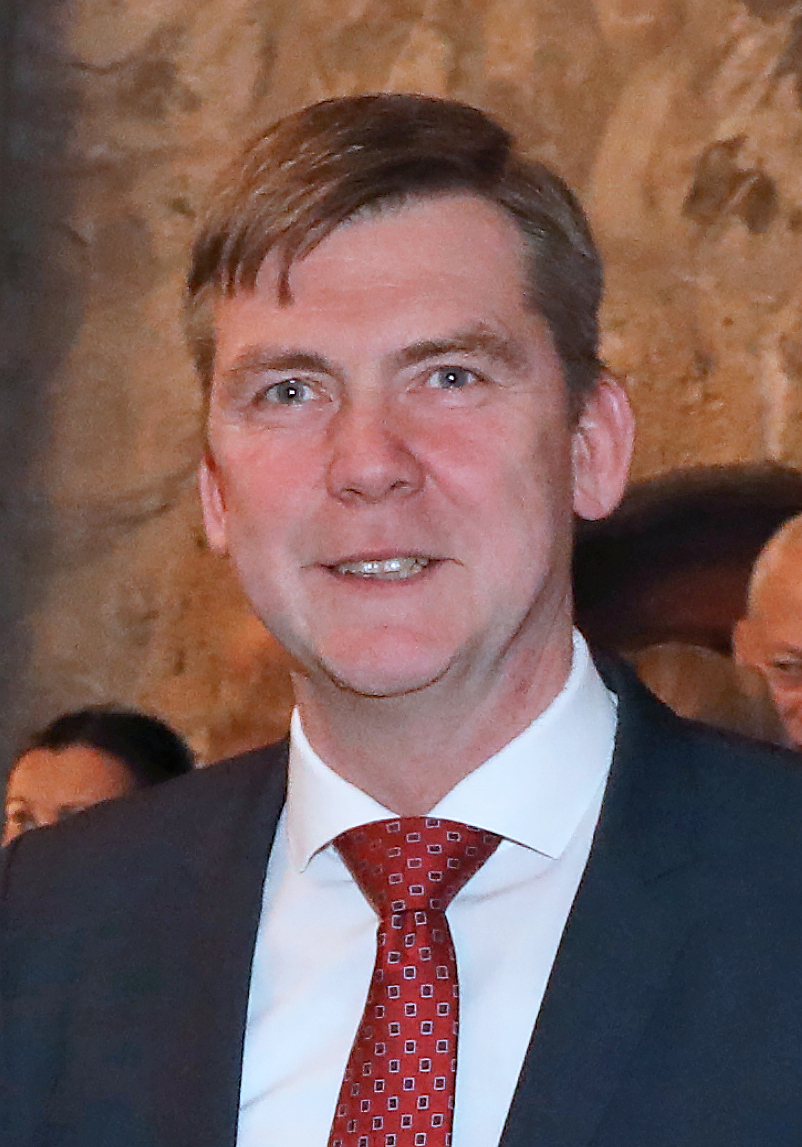
- Rehak in 2024

President of the Democrats for Liechtenstein
- Incumbent
- Assumed office 21 September 2018
- Vice President: Simon Schächle
- Preceded by: Position established

Member of the Landtag of Liechtenstein for Oberland
- Incumbent
- Assumed office 5 February 2017

Personal details
- Born: 21 January 1971 (age 55) Triesen, Liechtenstein
- Party: Democrats for Liechtenstein
- Other political affiliations: The Independents (2013–2018)
- Spouse: Michaela Beck (m. 2002)
- Children: 1
- Profession: Telecommunications engineer

Thomas Rehak (born 21 January 1971) is an engineer and politician from Liechtenstein who has served in the Landtag of Liechtenstein since 2017. He is the current leader of the Democrats for Liechtenstein, since 2018.

== Early life ==
Rehak was born on 21 January 1971 in Chur, Switzerland as the son of heating engineer Franz Rehak and hairdresser Agnes (née Kindle) as one of three children. He attended primary school in Triesen from 1978 to 1983 and then high school from 1983 to 1987.

He held an apprenticeship as an electrical engineer from 1987 to 1991 then from 1992 to 1995 he studied at the University of Applied Sciences of the Grisons in Chur.

== Career ==
From 1996 to 1999 he worked as a service engineer at the Alcatel-Lucent in Zurich, then TeleNet project manager at Telecom Liechtenstein. Since 2001 he is a self-employed telecommunications consultant and from 2004 to 2017 he was the managing director of the data centre operator ICT-Center AG in Vaduz and Zurich.

In 2013, Rehak was a founding member of The Independents party and from 2013 to 2017 he was a deputy member of the Landtag of Liechtenstein, and also a member of the Liechtenstein European Economic Area commission. He was a member of the audit commission from 2015 to 2021. Rehak has been a full member of the Landtag since 2017.

In August 2018 Landtag member Erich Hasler was expelled from The Independents under controversial circumstances. Rehak, along with Herbert Elkuch, sided with Hasler and left the party. The following month, the three men founded the Democrats for Liechtenstein. Rehak has been the leader of the party since its founding in 2018. In the 2021 Liechtenstein general election he was re-elected to the Landtag as a member of the party in his own right.

For the 2025 Liechtenstein general election, the party nominated Rehak as a government candidate on 16 December 2024, being the first time the party has presented government candidates since its formation. During campaigning, Rehak suggested the possibility of a three-party coalition, stating that the DpL "had a right to a seat in government". In the Landtag, he has been the DpL's spokesman since 2025.

== Personal life ==
Rehak married Michaela Beck on 19 October 2002 and they have one child together.
