= The Independents (Liechtenstein) =

The Independents Die Unabhängigen
- Abbreviation: DU
- Leader: Pio Schurti
- Founded: 2013
- Split from: Patriotic Union
- Headquarters: Feldkircherstrasse 50; LI-9494 Schaan
- Newspaper: Hoi du
- Ideology: Right-wing populism Euroscepticism
- Political position: Right-wing
- Colours: Black, White (official); Yellow (customary)
- Landtag: 0 / 25
- Mayors: 0 / 11
- Municipal Councils: 0 / 104

Website
- www.du4.li/

The Independents (German: Die Unabhängigen; abbreviated DU, meaning "YOU" in German) is a right-wing populist Eurosceptic political party in Liechtenstein. In the 2013 parliamentary election, the first they contested, they won 29,740 votes (15.3%) and four seats in the Landtag.

International commentators suggested that the party had benefited from protest votes against austerity measures. From 2013 to 2021 it was led by former Patriotic Union Landtag member Harry Quaderer, and since 2021 by Pio Schurti.

== History and political positions ==
DU is not a party in the traditional sense, having incorporated as a party solely to take advantage of the financial and political rights associated with that status; its platform calls for Members of the Landtag to be able to vote based on their own convictions rather than party pressures. According to Leiden University political science professor Wouter Veenendaal, the DU has an ideology "similar to that of the Progressive Citizens' Party and the Patriotic Union but its style is brasher."

The DU is "critical about migration and European integration." In 2015, the party called for Liechtenstein to reject the European Union's proposed resettlement of refugees, specifically stating that the EU policies "led by Merkel's Germany" were absurd.

On 16 August 2018, Landtag member Erich Hasler was expelled from the DU due to disagreements with Harry Quaderer regarding party organization and membership. Thomas Rehak and Herbert Elkuch, also members of the Landtag representing the DU, subsequently left the party in opposition to Hasler's expulsion. The following month, the three went on to form the Democrats for Liechtenstein, leaving the DU with only two seats in the Landtag.

The party suffered a major defeat in the 2021 Liechtenstein general election, losing its two remaining seats in the Landtag. In October of the same year, Harry Quaderer stepped down as leader and was succeeded by Pio Schurti.

== Electoral history ==
=== Landtag elections ===
Election	Leader	Votes	%	Seats	+/–	Rank	Government
2013	Harry Quaderer	29,739	15.32	4 / 25	New	▼3rd	Opposition
2017	Harry Quaderer	35,885	18.41	5 / 25	▲1	3rd	Opposition
2021	Harry Quaderer	8,556	4.24	0 / 25	▼3	▼5th	Extra-parliamentary
