= Brigitte Haas cabinet =

Government of Liechtenstein since 2025

- Government of Liechtenstein

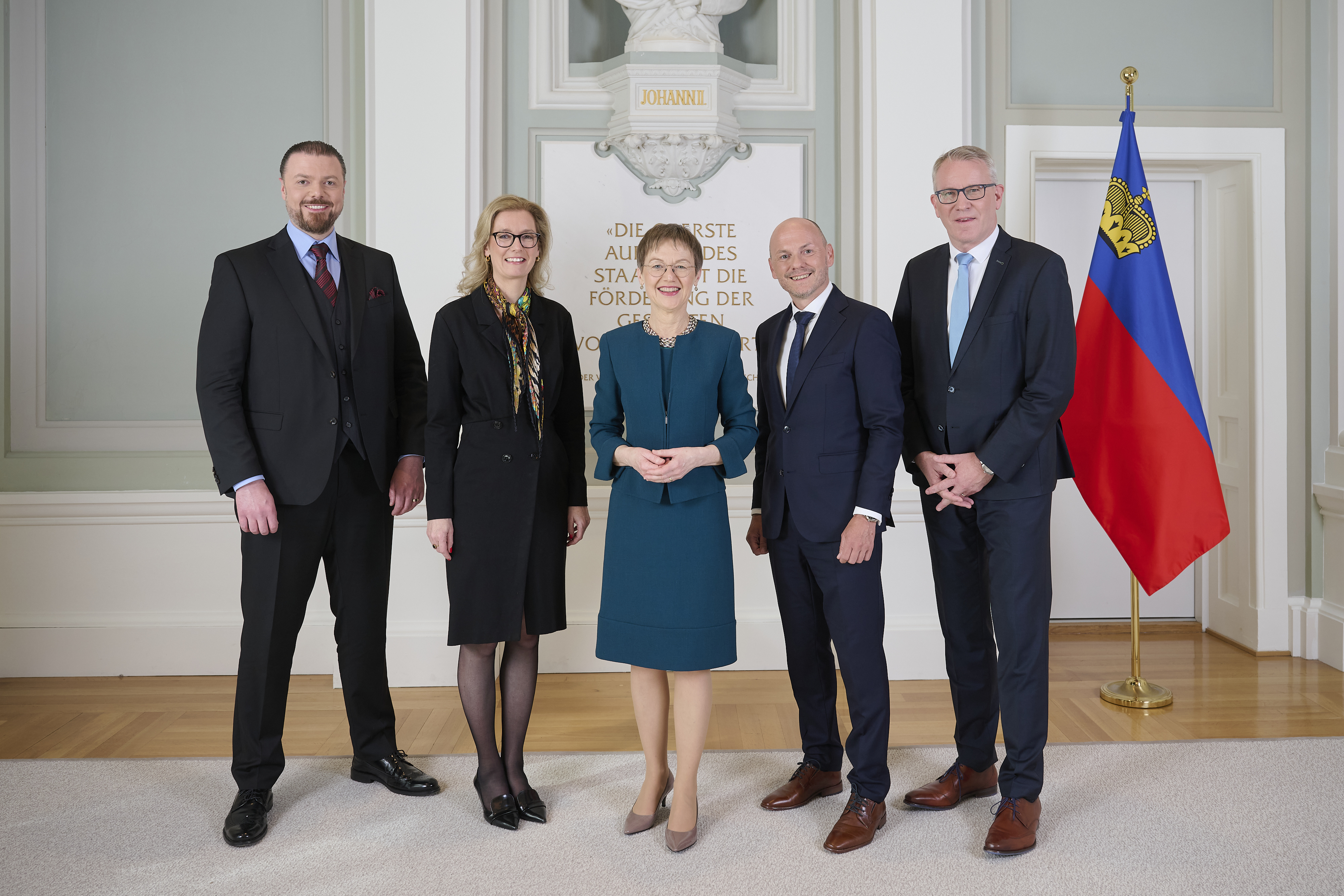
- Official photograph, 2025
- Date formed: 10 April 2025

People and organisations
- Head of state: Hans-Adam II; Alois (regent)
- Head of government: Brigitte Haas
- Deputy head of government: Sabine Monauni
- Total no. of members: 5
- Member parties: VU; FBP
- Status in legislature: Coalition
- Opposition party: Democrats for Liechtenstein; Free List

History
- Election: 2025
- Predecessor: Daniel Risch cabinet

The Brigitte Haas cabinet is the current chief executive body of Liechtenstein, being sworn in on 10 April 2025. It was appointed by Alois, Hereditary Prince of Liechtenstein on behalf of Hans-Adam II and is chaired by Brigitte Haas.

== Members ==
Picture	Name	Term	Role	Deputy	Party	Ref(s).
Prime Minister						
	Brigitte Haas	10 April 2025 –	Finance	Christoph Büchel	Patriotic Union	
Deputy Prime Minister
	Sabine Monauni	10 April 2025 –	Foreign affairs; Environment; Culture	Karin Zech-Hoop (2025); Sylvia Pedrazzini (2026–)	Progressive Citizens' Party	
Government councillors
	Hubert Büchel	10 April 2025 –	Interior; Economy; Sport	Orlando Wanner	Patriotic Union	
	Emanuel Schädler	10 April 2025 –	Society; Justice	Norma Heidegger	Patriotic Union	
	Daniel Oehry	10 April 2025 –	Infrastructure; Education	Andreas Haber	Progressive Citizens' Party	

== See also ==
- Politics of Liechtenstein
- List of members of the Landtag of Liechtenstein (2025–2029)
