= 2021 Liechtenstein general election =

- 7 February 2021
- All 25 seats in the Landtag; 13 seats needed for a majority
- Turnout: 78.01% (▲0.19pp)
Party	Leader	Vote %	Seats	+/–
VU	Daniel Risch	35.89	10	+2
FBP	Sabine Monauni	35.88	10	+1
FL	Conny Büchel Brühwiler; Pepo Frick	12.86	3	0
DpL	Thomas Rehak	11.14	2	New
This lists parties that won seats. See the complete results below.
Vote share by municipality
Prime Minister before	Prime Minister after
Adrian Hasler; FBP	Daniel Risch; VU

General elections were held in Liechtenstein on 7 February 2021 to elect the 25 members of the Landtag. The Patriotic Union (VU) and Progressive Citizens' Party (FBP) both won ten seats, with the VU receiving just 42 votes more than the FBP. The Independents (DU), which finished third in the 2017 elections but then suffered a split in 2018 when three of its five MPs broke away to form Democrats for Liechtenstein (DpL), failed to win a seat, while DpL won two. The Free List retained its three seats, becoming the third-largest party in the Landtag. Voter turnout was 78%.

Incumbent prime minister, Adrian Hasler, did not run for re-election. The FBP nominated Sabine Monauni for prime minister, being the first woman nominated for the position, while the VU nominated incumbent deputy prime minister, Daniel Risch, for the position. Following the elections, the VU and FBP formed a renewed coalition government, ultimately under the leadership of Risch. The new government was sworn in on 25 March 2021.

== Background ==
In the 2017 Liechtenstein general election, the Progressive Citizens' Party (FBP) won a plurality of nine seats, with the Patriotic Union (VU) winning eight. As a result, the two parties formed a coalition government, with Adrian Hasler continuing as prime minister. The Independents (DU) and Free List won five and three seats respectively.

In August 2018, the DU suffered a split when Landtag member Erich Hasler was expelled from the party due to conflicts with party leader Harry Quaderer, leading to fellow members Thomas Rehak and Herbert Elkuch leaving the party and forming the Democrats for Liechtenstein (DpL). This left the DU with two remaining seats in the Landtag.

Hasler's second term was marked by regulation of digital business models in the financial centre. Due to public attacks between Hasler and Landtag member Johannes Kaiser in 2018, Kaiser left the FBP and left the two parties with an equal amount of seats in the Landtag until he re-joined the party the following year. In July 2019, government councillor Aurelia Frick was subject to a successful motion of no confidence and removed from office due to an embezzlement scandal.

Johannes Hasler of the FBP resigned from the Landtag in October 2019 in order to focus on his duties as mayor of Gamprin, and was succeeded by Alexander Batliner.

== Landtag members not running for re-election ==
Member	Constituency	First elected	Party
Christoph Wenaweser	Oberland	2013	Patriotic Union
Frank Konrad	Oberland	2013	Patriotic Union
Susanne Eberle-Strub	Oberland	2017	Progressive Citizens' Party
Harry Quaderer	Oberland	2005	The Independents
Jürgen Beck	Oberland	2005	The Independents
Violanda Lanter	Unterland	2013	Patriotic Union
Elfried Hasler	Unterland	2013	Progressive Citizens' Party
Eugen Nägele	Unterland	2013	Progressive Citizens' Party

== Electoral system ==
The 25 members of the Landtag are elected by open list proportional representation from two constituencies, Oberland with 15 seats and Unterland with 10 seats. Voters voted for a party list and then may have struck through candidates for whom they did not wish to cast a preferential vote, and may also have added names of candidates from other lists. The electoral threshold to win a seat was 8%. Landtag members sit for a four-year term. Once formed, the Landtag elected the prime minister and two government councillors who were then appointed by the reigning prince to govern in a cabinet. Voting was compulsory by law, and those who failed to vote without a valid reason may be fined, but it was not enforced. Polling stations were open only for one and a half hours on election day. Citizens over 18 years of age who had been resident in the country for at least one month prior to election day were eligible to vote.

== Campaign ==
=== Main parties ===
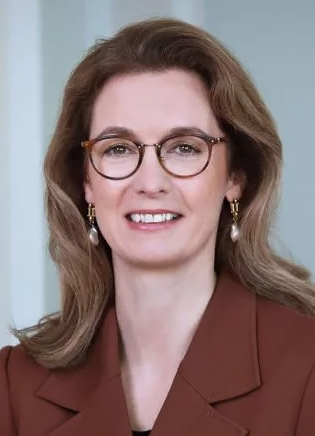
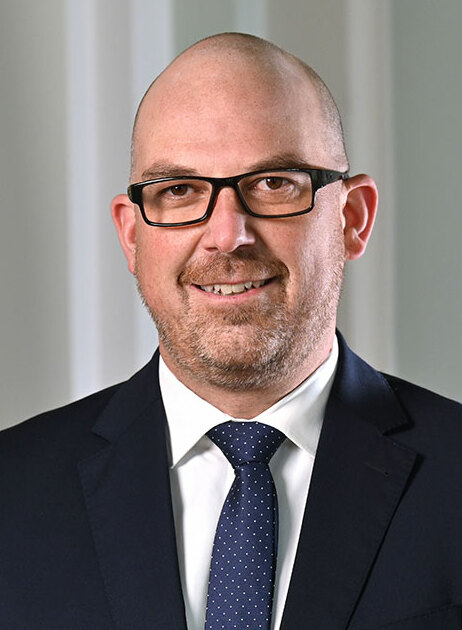
Sabine Monauni (left) and Daniel Risch (right) were the FBP and VU's respective nominations for prime minister

In a press conference on 27 May 2020, Adrian Hasler declared his intention to not seek re-election. The FBP nominated Sabine Monauni, the Liechtenstein ambassador to the European Union, for prime minister on 18 August 2020, being the first woman nominated for the position in Liechtenstein's history. Additionally, the party nominated incumbent government councillor Katrin Eggenberger and deputy government councillor Manuel Frick as government candidates. The FBP's programme included policies such as faster digitalization, traffic calming, and promoting renewable energy.

The VU nominated incumbent deputy prime minister Daniel Risch for prime minister on 10 September 2020. Additionally, the party nominated incumbent government councillor Dominique Hasler and lawyer Graziella Marok-Wachter as government candidates. In an interview in December, Risch stated that he would not be a part of the next government should the party lose the election. The VU's programme included policies such as building schools, implementing Mobility 2030, and climate protection.

The election was seen as a two-horse race; there were only marginal policy differences between the VU and FBP. The newspaper Liechtensteiner Vaterland described the run-up to the election as "lacklustre" and with "no controversial issues". VU party president Günther Fritz stated that a coalition with the FBP was "very likely" should the VU win the election.

=== Opposition parties ===
Commentators expected the DU, which had received 18.4% of the vote in 2017, to perform poorly in the election, perhaps failing to meet the electoral threshold. The party's two remaining Landtag members, party leader Harry Quaderer and Jürgen Beck, announced their intention to not seek re-election in October 2020. On the other hand, the DpL was expected to achieve better results, perhaps as high as 20%. In October 2020, following Quaderer's withdrawal as a candidate, DpL president Thomas Rehak stated that a joint list between the DU and DpL was "quite obvious". Similarly, deputy member of the Landtag Ado Vogt, belonging to the DU, said "never say never" in regards to reconciliation with the DpL, but ultimately aiming for the party to run its own list. Both the DU and DpL's programmes included giving priority to Liechtensteiners to jobs in the national administration. Furthermore, the DpL's programme included policies such as placing greater restrictions on naturalizing in Liechtenstein and for the members of government being directly elected.

The Free List had been in political dispute since 2019 when Landtag member Thomas Lageder, belonging to the party, voted in favour of the motion of no confidence against Aurelia Frick, against the wishes of party leaders Conny Büchel Brühwiler and Pepo Frick. The conflict remerged in late 2020 when Lageder threatened to withdraw his candidacy in the election. In addition, three party board members also threatened to resign and two other Landtag candidates announced that they would also renounce their candidacy should Lageder do so. Ultimately, the two sides came to an agreement and the Free List presented its candidates on 19 November, including Lageder. The party had previously ruled out cooperation with the DpL. The Free List's programme included policies such as greater transition to green energy, voting rights for Liechtensteiners living abroad in addition to allowing dual citizenship, and improving economic prospects for artists.

=== Procedure ===
Election campaigning is largely unregulated and carried out via social media, newspapers and broadcast media. All parties are permitted to post an official campaign video on the websites of the two main newspapers in the country. The elections are the first to be carried out under the 2019 Law on Payment of Contributions to Political Parties which limited public funding to registered political parties, banned large anonymous donations and required the publication of accounts by parties.

== Candidates ==
Candidates have the same eligibility criteria as voters. Political parties must have the support of 30 voters from a constituency to be eligible to nominate a candidate list in it. The deadline for presenting Landtag candidates was set for 4 December 2020. It was reported that parties experienced difficulty finding candidates due to the ongoing COVID-19 pandemic.

Oberland	FBP	VU	FL
Oberland	Eva-Maria Bechter; Albert Frick; Andrea Heutschi-Rhomberg; Elke Kindle; Wendelin Lampert; Daniel Ospelt; Bettina Petzold-Mähr; Sascha Quaderer; Sebastian Schädler; Daniel Seger; Nadine Vogelsang; Damian Wille	Georges Baur; Rainer Beck; Dagmar Bühler-Nigsch; Roswitha Feger-Risch; Walter Frick; Etienne Frommelt; Otto C. Frommelt; Markus Gstöhl; Norma Heidegger; Gabriela Hilti-Saleem; Manfred Kaufmann; Philip Schädler; Günter Vogt; Thomas Vogt	Conny Büchel Brühwiler; Nadine Gstöhl; Manuela Haldner-Schierscher; René Hasler; George Kaufmann; Thomas Lageder; Moritz Rheinberger; Corina Vogt-Beck
Oberland	DU	DpL	
Oberland	Gregor Ott; Pio Schurti; Ado Vogt	Bruno Foser; Philipp Foser; Herta Kaufmann; Alex Meier; Pascal Ospelt; René Pawlitzek; Thomas Rehak; Roland Rick	
Unterland	FBP	VU	FL
Unterland	Alexander Batliner; Thomas Hasler; Sonja Hersche; Veronika Hilti-Wohlwend; Franziska Hoop; Johannes Kaiser; Daniel Oehry; Karin Zech-Hoop	Stephan Agnolazza-Hoop; Hubert Büchel; Peter Frick; Dietmar Lampert; Gunilla Marxer-Kranz; Mario Marxer; Andreas Wenzel; Mario Wohlwend	Sandra Fausch; Harry Hasler; Andrea Matt; Patrick Risch
Unterland	DU	DpL	
Unterland	Casper Hoop; Adi Wohlwend	Agnes Dentsch; Herbert Elkuch; Gabriele Haas; Erich Hasler; Johannes Ilic; Reinhard Marxer; Norbert Obermayr; Toni Schächle	
Source: Landtagswahl 2021

== Results ==
The VU and FBP both received 35.9% of the vote. The result was close between the top two parties with the VU initially reported to have received just 23 votes more than the FBP; in later results, the gap was marginally wider at 42 votes. The FBP result was a slight improvement on their 2017 performance when they received 35.2% of the vote, while the VU increased their vote share from 33.7%. Both the VU and FBP won ten seats, an increase from eight and nine respectively. The Free List received 12.9% of the vote, a moderate increase from their 12.7% in 2017, and kept their representation at three seats which made them the third-largest party in the Landtag. The new party, Democrats for Liechtenstein received 11.1% of the vote and won two seats.

A total of 15,901 ballots were cast, resulting in a 78% voter turnout. The vast majority (97%) of ballots were cast by post. The results were described by local media as some of the most exciting in recent history.

Party	Votes	%	Seats	+/–
Patriotic Union	72,361	35.89	10	+2
Progressive Citizens' Party	72,319	35.87	10	+1
Free List	25,943	12.87	3	0
Democrats for Liechtenstein	22,456	11.14	2	New
The Independents	8,556	4.24	0	–5
Total	201,635	100.00	25	0
Valid votes	15,284	96.12		
Invalid/blank votes	617	3.88		
Total votes	15,901	100.00		
Registered voters/turnout	20,384	78.01		
Source: Landtagswahlen 2021

=== By electoral district ===
Electoral district	Seats	Electorate	Party	Elected members	Subsititutes	Votes	%	Swing	Seats won	+/–
Oberland	15	13,137	Patriotic Union	Manfred Kaufmann; Thomas Vogt; Dagmar Bühler-Nigsch; Günter Vogt; Walter Frick; Norma Heidegger	Philip Schädler; Markus Gstöhl	54,018	36.9	▼2.5	6	▲1
Oberland	15	13,137	Progressive Citizens' Party	Sebastian Gassner; Daniel Seger; Wendelin Lampert; Albert Frick; Sascha Quaderer; Bettina Petzold-Mähr	Nadine Vogelsang; Elke Kindle	50,844	34.7	▼1.1	6	▲1
Oberland	15	13,137	Free List	Georg Kaufmann; Manuela Haldner-Schierscher	Nadine Gstöhl	20,026	13.7	▲0.4	2	0
Oberland	15	13,137	Democrats for Liechtenstein	Thomas Rehak	Pascal Ospelt	14,127	9.7	New	1	New
Oberland	15	13,137	The Independents	–	–	7,370	5.0	▼13.6	0	▼3
Unterland	10	7,247	Progressive Citizens' Party	Franziska Hoop; Johannes Kaiser; Daniel Oehry; Karin Zech-Hoop	Thomas Hasler	21,475	38.9	▼0.6	4	0
Unterland	10	7,247	Patriotic Union	Gunilla Marxer-Kranz; Peter Frick; Mario Wohlwend; Dietmar Lampert	Hubert Büchel	18,343	33.2	▲1.2	4	▲1
Unterland	10	7,247	Democrats for Liechtenstein	Herbert Elkuch	Erich Hasler	8,329	15.1	New	1	New
Unterland	10	7,247	Free List	Patrick Risch	Sandra Fausch	5,715	10.7	▼0.1	1	0
Unterland	10	7,247	The Independents	–	–	1,186	2.1	▼15.6	0	▼2
Source: Landtagswahlen 2021

=== Votes by candidate ===
Constituency	Party	Candidate	Votes
Oberland	Patriotic Union	Manfred Kaufmann	4,117
Oberland	Patriotic Union	Thomas Vogt	3,574
Oberland	Patriotic Union	Dagmar Bühler-Nigsch	3,554
Oberland	Patriotic Union	Günter Vogt	3,307
Oberland	Patriotic Union	Walter Frick	3,162
Oberland	Patriotic Union	Norma Heidegger	3,122
Oberland	Patriotic Union	Philip Schädler	3,101
Oberland	Patriotic Union	Markus Gstöhl	3,051
Oberland	Patriotic Union	Gabriela Hilti-Saleem	3,041
Oberland	Patriotic Union	Etienne Frommelt	3,015
Oberland	Patriotic Union	Rainer Beck	2,973
Oberland	Patriotic Union	Roswitha Feger-Risch	2,922
Oberland	Patriotic Union	Georges Baur	2,895
Oberland	Progressive Citizens' Party	Sebastian Schädler	3,697
Oberland	Progressive Citizens' Party	Daniel Seger	3,605
Oberland	Progressive Citizens' Party	Wendelin Lampert	3,552
Oberland	Progressive Citizens' Party	Albert Frick	3,437
Oberland	Progressive Citizens' Party	Sascha Quaderer	3,420
Oberland	Progressive Citizens' Party	Bettina Petzold-Mähr	3,223
Oberland	Progressive Citizens' Party	Nadine Vogelsang	3,155
Oberland	Progressive Citizens' Party	Elke Kindle	3,066
Oberland	Progressive Citizens' Party	Daniel Ospelt	3,033
Oberland	Progressive Citizens' Party	Damian Wille	2,830
Oberland	Progressive Citizens' Party	Andrea Heutschi-Rhomberg	2,700
Oberland	Progressive Citizens' Party	Eva-Maria Bechter	2,646
Oberland	Free List	George Kaufmann	1,757
Oberland	Free List	Manuela Haldner-Schierscher	1,597
Oberland	Free List	Nadine Gstöhl	1,492
Oberland	Free List	Thomas Lageder	1,467
Oberland	Free List	Moritz Rheinberger	1,445
Oberland	Free List	René Hasler	1,390
Oberland	Free List	Corina Vogt-Beck	1,354
Oberland	Free List	Conny Büchel Brühwiler	1,274
Oberland	Democrats for Liechtenstein	Thomas Rehak	1,686
Oberland	Democrats for Liechtenstein	Pascal Ospelt	1,098
Oberland	Democrats for Liechtenstein	Herta Kaufmann	1,011
Oberland	Democrats for Liechtenstein	Alex Meier	939
Oberland	Democrats for Liechtenstein	Bruno Foser	892
Oberland	Democrats for Liechtenstein	Philipp Foser	833
Oberland	Democrats for Liechtenstein	Roland Rick	819
Oberland	Democrats for Liechtenstein	René Pawlitzek	706
Oberland	The Independents	Ado Vogt	1,132
Oberland	The Independents	Pio Schurti	847
Oberland	The Independents	Gregor Ott	598
Unterland	Patriotic Union	Gunilla Marxer-Kranz	2,206
Unterland	Patriotic Union	Peter Frick	1,959
Unterland	Patriotic Union	Mario Wohlwend	1,914
Unterland	Patriotic Union	Dietmar Lampert	1,871
Unterland	Patriotic Union	Hubert Büchel	1,760
Unterland	Patriotic Union	Stephan Agnolazza-Hoop	1,759
Unterland	Patriotic Union	Mario Marxer	1,591
Unterland	Patriotic Union	Andreas Wenzel	1,515
Unterland	Progressive Citizens' Party	Franziska Hoop	2,091
Unterland	Progressive Citizens' Party	Johannes Kaiser	2,068
Unterland	Progressive Citizens' Party	Daniel Oehry	2,067
Unterland	Progressive Citizens' Party	Karin Zech-Hoop	2,055
Unterland	Progressive Citizens' Party	Thomas Hasler	2,049
Unterland	Progressive Citizens' Party	Alexander Batliner	1,934
Unterland	Progressive Citizens' Party	Sonja Hersche	1,929
Unterland	Progressive Citizens' Party	Veronika Hilti-Wohlwend	1,731
Unterland	Free List	Patrick Risch	929
Unterland	Free List	Sandra Fausch	920
Unterland	Free List	Andrea Matt	751
Unterland	Free List	Harry Hasler	633
Unterland	Democrats for Liechtenstein	Herbert Elkuch	1,694
Unterland	Democrats for Liechtenstein	Erich Hasler	1,054
Unterland	Democrats for Liechtenstein	Norbert Obermayr	691
Unterland	Democrats for Liechtenstein	Toni Schächle	643
Unterland	Democrats for Liechtenstein	Reinhard Marxer	558
Unterland	Democrats for Liechtenstein	Gabriele Haas	546
Unterland	Democrats for Liechtenstein	Agnes Dentsch	525
Unterland	Democrats for Liechtenstein	Johannes Ilic	479
Unterland	The Independents	Caspar Hoop	303
Unterland	The Independents	Adi Wohlwend	259

== Aftermath ==
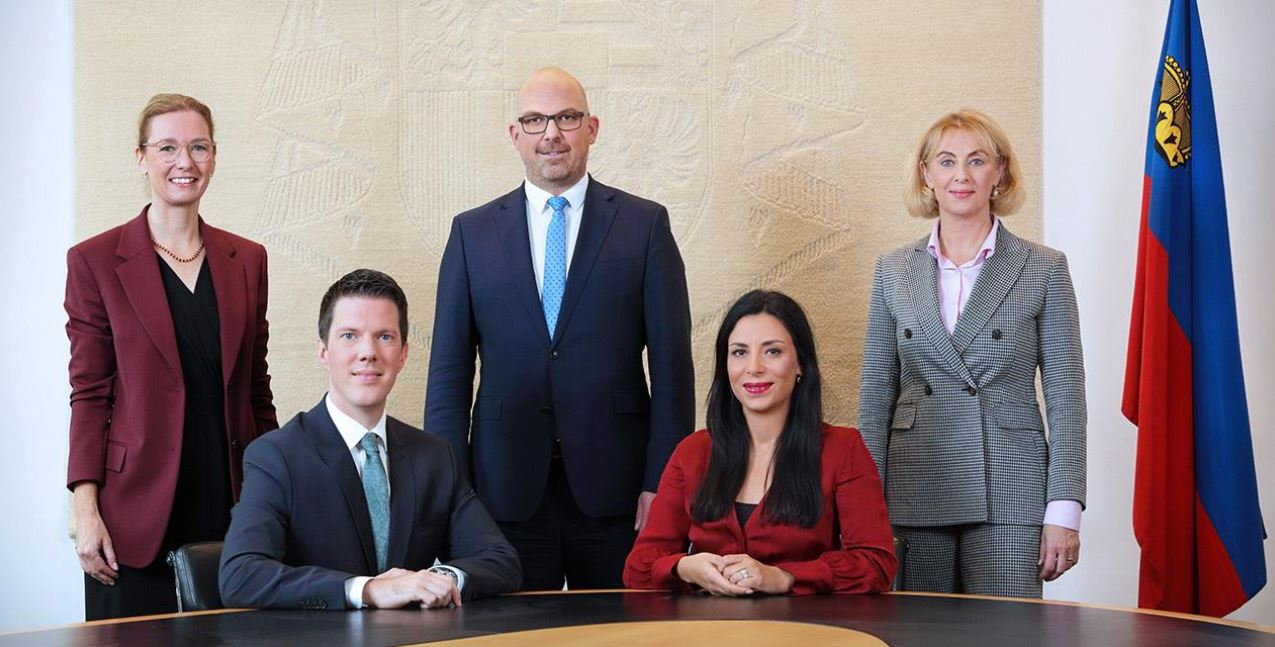
The government of Daniel Risch

In the aftermath of the election, it was not immediately clear which party had won. A recount was conducted the following day, but was delayed due to COVID-19 protection measures. It was ultimately determined on 9 February that the VU was the winner by a lead of 42 votes. The VU invited the FBP to enter negotiations for the formation of a coalition government. The Free List also stated that it was open to participation in government should coalition negotiations between the two parties fail.

The VU and FBP entered into a renewed coalition government, ultimately under the leadership of Risch. As the junior party in the coalition, Monauni became deputy prime minister. The FBP nominated Frick for government over Eggenberger, which caused controversy within the party due to her allegedly being promised a seat in government in July 2019 by party president Marcus Vogt. Though supporters of Eggenberger attempted to block Frick's nomination at the party conference on 22 March, his nomination was ultimately upheld. The new government was sworn in on 25 March. As part of the coalition agreement, Albert Frick of the FBP remained as president of the Landtag.

A poll published by the Liechtenstein Institute suggested that 35% of respondents who voted for the VU and FBP did so because of the party's respective government teams, the highest out of any factor. It also suggested that traditional party affiliation declined, as only 8% of respondents cited it as the reason for their vote. Voters for the DpL and DU cited the respective Landtag candidates and opposition to Risch, whereas voters for the Free List cited the party's policies; the DU lost 85% of its votes from 2017, primarily to the DpL.

== See also ==
- Elections in Liechtenstein
- List of Liechtenstein general elections
