= Schedlich =

Schedlich is a German surname. Notable people with the surname include:

- Bosiljka Schedlich (born 1948), Croatian-German human rights activist
- Harold Schedlich, Australian rules footballer, born 1915
- Klara Schedlich (born 2000), German politician

== See also ==
- Schadler
- Schädlich
