= Schädler =

Schädler or Schaedler is a German surname. Notable people with the surname include:

- Gebhard Schädler (1776–1842), Liechtensteiner surgeon
- Karl Schädler (1804–1872), President of the Landtag of Liechtenstein
- Albert Schädler (1848–1922), President of the Landtag of Liechtenstein
- Karl Schädler (1850–1907), Liechtensteiner engineer and politician
- Johann Schädler (politician) (1875–1953), Liechtenstein politician
- Gustav Schädler (1883–1961), Prime Minister of Liechtenstein
- Theodor Schädler (1896–1975), Liechtenstein politician
- Otto Schaedler (1898–1965), Liechtensteiner politician
- Eugen Schädler (1899–1973), Liechtenstein politician
- Franz Schädler (alpine skier) (1917–1941), Liechtenstein former alpine skier
- Erich Peter Schaedler (1949–1985), German-Scottish professional footballer
- Franz Schädler (footballer) (born 1968), former Liechtenstein football midfielder
- Marco Schädler (born 1965), Liechtensteiner composer
- Tino Schaedler (born 1972), German film art director
- Roger Schädler (born 1976), Liechtenstein banker and politician
- Emanuel Schädler (born 1983), Liechtenstein government councillor

== See also ==
- Schedel
- Lillian Schoedler (1891–1963), secretary of the New York City Intercollegiate Bureau of Occupations
