= Daniel Risch cabinet =

Government of Liechtenstein from 2021 to 2025

- Government of Liechtenstein

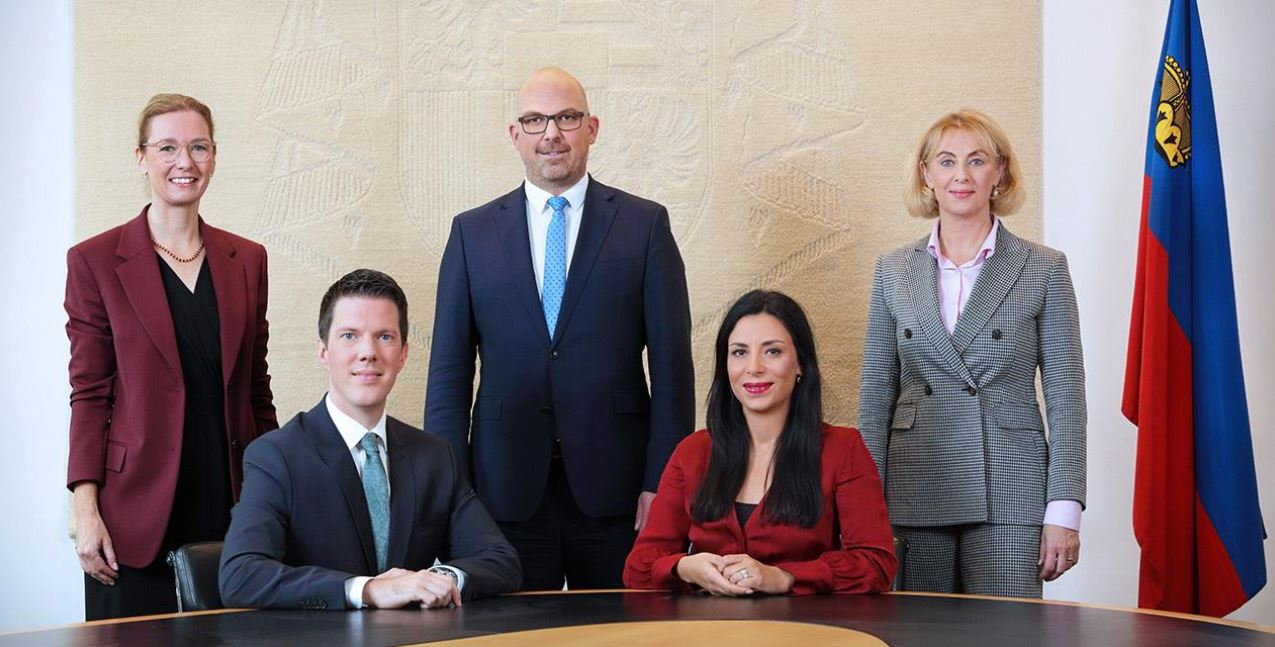
- Official photograph, 2021
- Date formed: 25 March 2021
- Date dissolved: 10 April 2025

People and organisations
- Head of state: Hans-Adam II; Alois (regent)
- Head of government: Daniel Risch
- Deputy head of government: Sabine Monauni
- Total no. of members: 5
- Member parties: VU; FBP
- Status in legislature: Coalition
- Opposition party: Free List; Democrats for Liechtenstein

History
- Election: 2021
- Predecessor: Second Adrian Hasler cabinet
- Successor: Brigitte Haas cabinet

The Daniel Risch cabinet was the governing body of Liechtenstein from 25 March 2021 to 10 April 2025. It was appointed by Alois, Hereditary Prince of Liechtenstein and on behalf of Hans-Adam II and was chaired by Daniel Risch.

== History ==
The 2021 Liechtenstein general election resulted in a virtual tie between the Patriotic Union and the Progressive Citizens' Party and Daniel Risch was appointed as Prime Minister of Liechtenstein on 25 March 2021, heading a new coalition government with the Progressive Citizens' Party.

The government spearheaded Liechtenstein's support for Ukraine in the wake of the Russian invasion of Ukraine, starting in February 2022.

During the government's term in office, in November 2022, the Landtag of Liechtenstein passed a motion calling on the government to introduce a bill legalizing same-sex marriage, with broad support from across the political spectrum. A bill legalizing same-sex marriage was introduced in February 2024 and passed its final reading in the Landtag on 16 May 2024 by a 24–1 vote.

From November 2023 to May 2024 Liechtenstein held the Presidency of the Committee of Ministers of the Council of Europe, headed by foreign minister Dominique Hasler. Hasler and Risch started the government-funded Book of Europe project in spring 2024, during Liechtenstein's presidency of the Council of Europe. In the book, the heads of government of the 46 members of the council were asked to write their thoughts and vision of Europe, which 33 did so. The book was published in February 2025.

In addition, the government oversaw Liechtenstein's accession to the International Monetary Fund, and started the proceedings for it in 2024. Liechtenstein joined the IMF on 21 October 2024. This came after a successful referendum was held the previous month.

On 19 February 2024 Risch declared his intention to not run for re-election. The 2025 Liechtenstein general election resulted in a win for the Patriotic Union. As a result, the cabinet was dissolved and Risch was succeeded by Brigitte Haas in the Brigitte Haas cabinet.

== Members ==
Picture	Name	Term	Role	Party
Prime Minister
	Daniel Risch	25 March 2021 – 10 April 2025	Finance	Patriotic Union
Deputy Prime Minister
	Sabine Monauni	25 March 2021 – 10 April 2025	Interior; Economy; Environment	Progressive Citizens' Party
Government councillors
	Graziella Marok-Wachter	25 March 2021 – 10 April 2025	Infrastructure; Justice	Patriotic Union
	Dominique Hasler	25 March 2021 – 10 April 2025	Foreign affairs; Education; Sport	Patriotic Union
	Manuel Frick	25 March 2021 – 10 April 2025	Social affairs; Culture	Progressive Citizens' Party

== See also ==
- Politics of Liechtenstein
- List of members of the Landtag of Liechtenstein (2021–2025)
