= Schedel =

Schedel, Schädel, Schaedel is a German surname. Notable people with the surname include:

- Abraham Schedel (fl. c. 1600), Bohemian printer and corrector for the press
- Gottfried Johann Schädel (1680–1752), German architect
- Hartmann Schedel (1440–1514), German physician, humanist, historian, cartographer and printer
- Josef Maria Schedel (1856–1943), German apothecary and orientalist collector
- Sebastian Schedel (1570–1628), German painter and illustrator

== See also ==
- Schedl
- Schadler
