= Second Adrian Hasler cabinet =

Government of Liechtenstein from 2017 to 2021

- Government of Liechtenstein

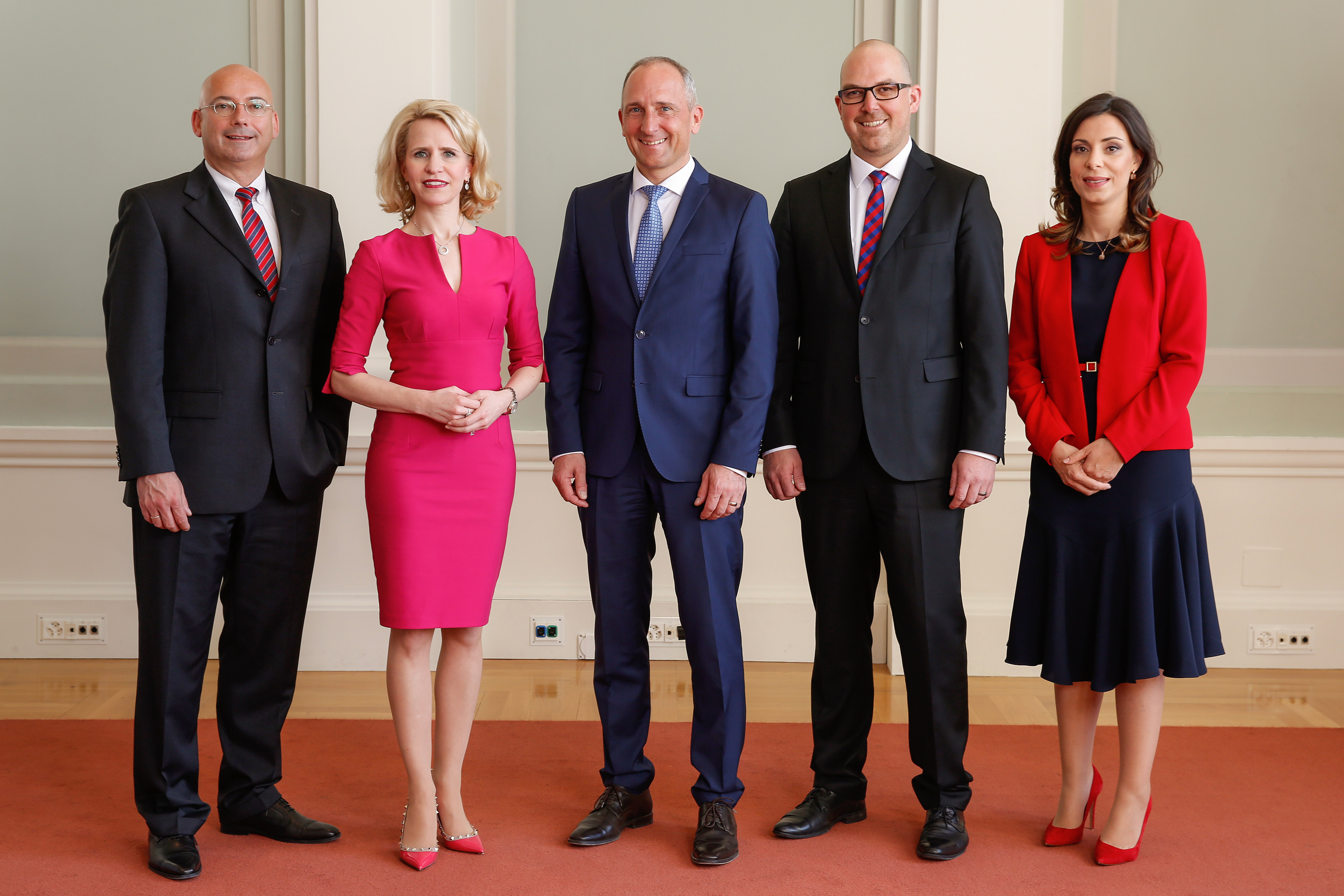
- Official photograph, 2017
- Date formed: 30 March 2017
- Date dissolved: 25 March 2021

People and organisations
- Head of state: Hans-Adam II; Alois (regent)
- Head of government: Adrian Hasler
- Deputy head of government: Daniel Risch
- Total no. of members: 6
- Member parties: FBP; VU
- Status in legislature: Coalition
- Opposition party: Free List The Independents Democrats for Liechtenstein

History
- Election: 2017
- Predecessor: First Adrian Hasler cabinet
- Successor: Daniel Risch cabinet

The Second Adrian Hasler cabinet was the governing body of Liechtenstein from 30 March 2017 to 25 March 2021. It was appointed by Alois, Hereditary Prince of Liechtenstein on behalf of Hans-Adam II and was chaired by Adrian Hasler.

== History ==
The 2017 Liechtenstein general election resulted in a win for the Progressive Citizens' Party. As a result, the First Adrian Hasler cabinet was dissolved with Adrian Hasler continuing as Prime Minister of Liechtenstein. The Progressive Citizens' Party and Patriotic Union once again entered into a coalition government.

In 2019, Aurelia Frick, minister of foreign affairs, was subject to an embezzlement scandal where she was accused of misappropriating funds as a part of her duties and not being declaring enough with the Landtag of Liechtenstein's audit commission. In response, Hasler called for Frick to make an apology and to cooperate with the audit commission regarding the investigation. However, she refused to cooperate with the audit commission, and on 2 July 2019 the Landtag passed a motion of no confidence against her, and she was expelled from her position. She was succeeded by Katrin Eggenberger.

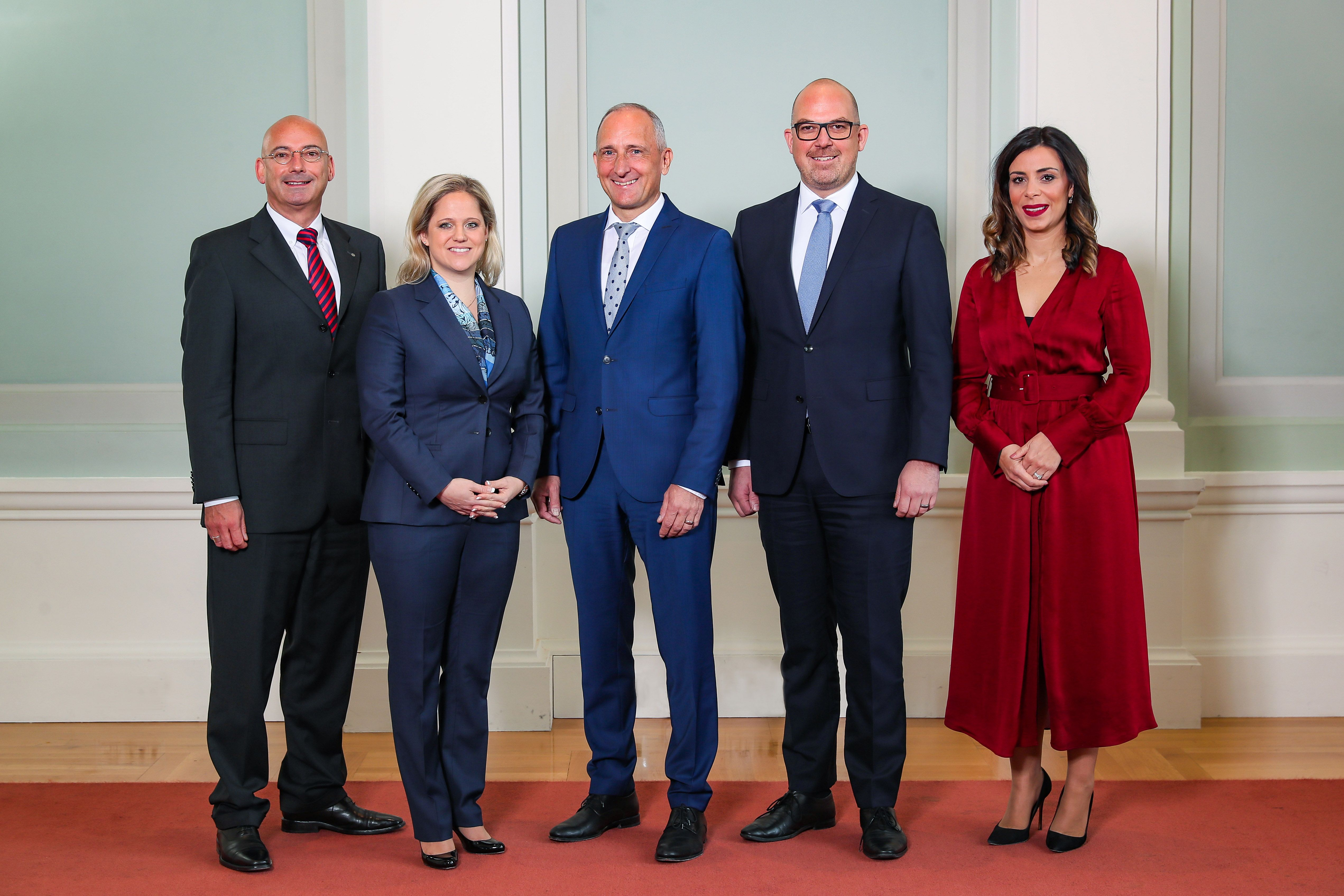
Hasler's cabinet in 2019, with Katrin Eggenberger having replaced Aurelia Frick

Near the end of the government's term, the cabinet was faced with the challenge of the COVID-19 pandemic in Liechtenstein. Due to school closures as a result of the pandemic, the cabinet pioneered the transformation of Liechtenstein's education to a digital platform, particularly by that of Dominique Hasler, responsible for the ministry of education.

On 27 May 2020, Adrian Hasler announced that he would not run for re-election. The 2021 Liechtenstein general election resulted in a win for the Patriotic Union. As a result, the cabinet was dissolved and Hasler was succeeded by Daniel Risch in the Daniel Risch cabinet.

== Members ==
Picture	Name	Term	Role	Party
Prime Minister
	Adrian Hasler	30 March 2017 – 25 March 2021	Finance	Progressive Citizens' Party
Deputy Prime Minister
	Daniel Risch	30 March 2017 – 25 March 2021	Infrastructure; Economy; Sport	Patriotic Union
Government councillors
	Mauro Pedrazzini	30 March 2017 – 25 March 2021	Business	Progressive Citizens' Party
	Aurelia Frick	30 March 2017 – 2 July 2019	Foreign affairs; Justice; Culture	Progressive Citizens' Party
	Katrin Eggenberger	11 November 2019 – 25 March 2021	Foreign affairs; Justice; Culture	Progressive Citizens' Party
	Dominique Hasler	30 March 2017 – 25 March 2021	Interior; Education; Environment	Patriotic Union

== See also ==
- Politics of Liechtenstein
