= Karin Zech-Hoop =

Liechtenstein politician (born 1973)

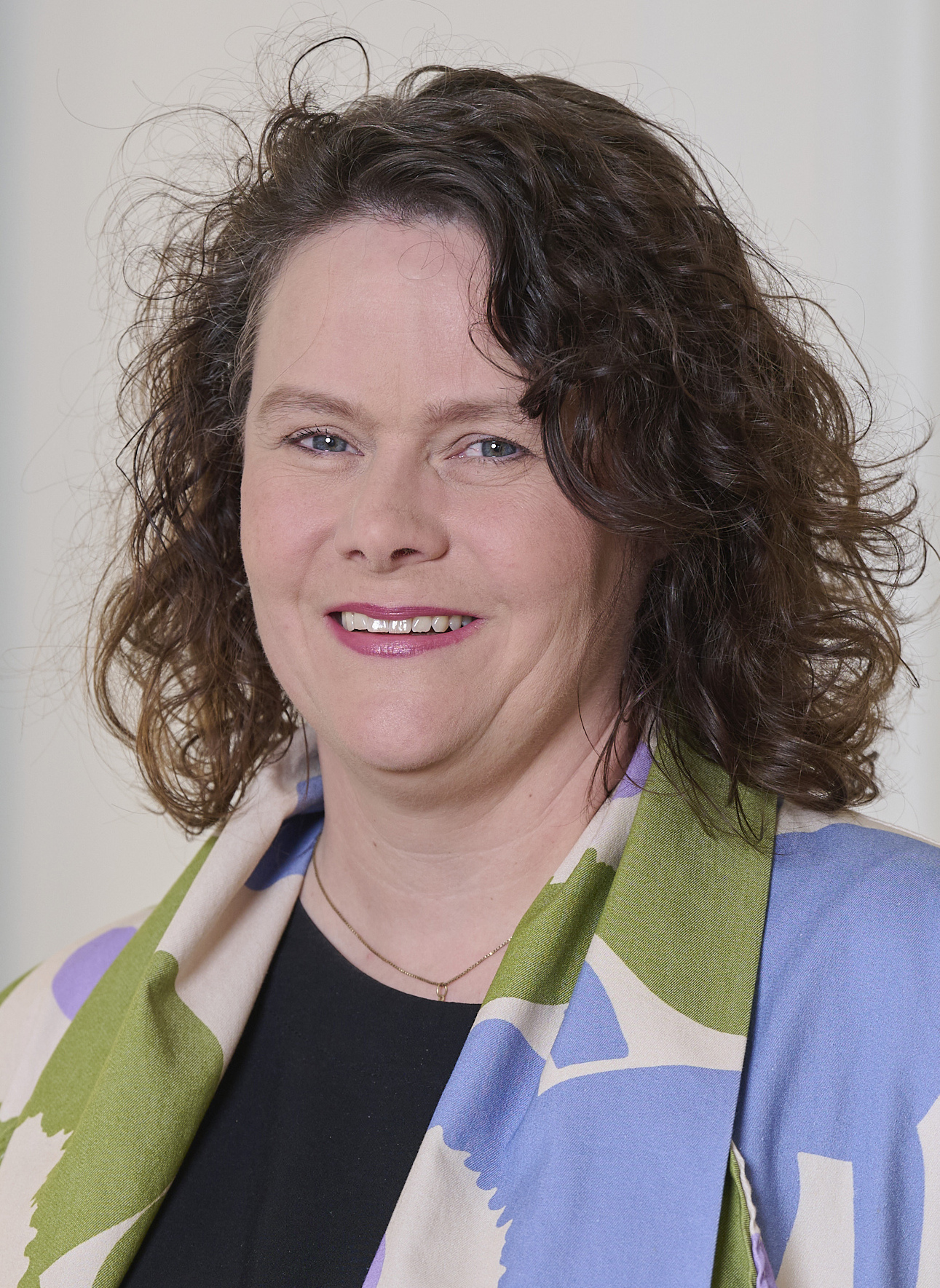
- Official portrait, 2025

Member of the Landtag of Liechtenstein for Unterland
- In office 7 February 2021 – 9 February 2025

Personal details
- Born: Karin Zech; 16 November 1973 (age 52) St. Gallen, Switzerland
- Party: Progressive Citizens' Party
- Spouse: Uwe Hoop (m. 1996)
- Children: 2

Karin Zech-Hoop (née Zech; born 16 November 1973) is a politician from Liechtenstein who served in the Landtag of Liechtenstein from 2021 to 2025.

== Life ==
Zech-Hoop was born on 16 November 1973 in St. Gallen as the daughter of Roland Zech and Gerlinde Jehle as one of two children. She attended primary school in Schaan and then secondary school at the St. Elisabeth Monastery. From 1988 to 1993 she attended at the federal commercial academy in Feldkirch. From 1994 to 1998 she studied economics at the University of St. Gallen.

From 2002 to 2007 she worked in the Liechtenstein government and was the director of the Liechtenstein state hospital from 2008 to 2012. Since 2014, she has been the managing director of Hoop Whisky GmbH in Eschen and from 2020 to 2022 deputy managing director of the Liechtenstein health insurance association. Since 2025, she has been the co-head of the health insurance association.

From 2019 to 2023 Zech-Hoop was a member of the Eschen municipal council as a member of the Progressive Citizens' Party. From 2021 to 2025, she was a member of the Landtag of Liechtenstein and also a substitute member of the Liechtenstein delegation to the European Free Trade Association parliamentary committees. She is an advocate for climate protection in Liechtenstein. She unsuccessfully ran for re-election in 2025.

From April to October 2025, she was the deputy government councillor to Sabine Monauni. She resigned to avoid a conflict of interest upon being appointed the co-head of the Liechtenstein health insurance association and was succeeded by Sylvia Pedrazzini in January 2026.

She married Uwe Hoop on 28 July 2006 and they have two children together. She lives in Eschen.
