= Hubert Büchel =

Hubert Büchel may refer to:

- Hubert Büchel (diplomat) (born 1951), Liechtenstein diplomat
- Hubert Büchel (politician) (born 1973), Liechtenstein government councillor
