= Schädlich =

Schädlich is a German surname. Notable people with the surname include:

- Georg Martin Schädlich, German soldier of the Wehrmacht during World War II
- Gerd Schädlich (1952–2022), German footballer and manager
- Gottfried Schädlich, German writer and military officer
- Hans Joachim Schädlich (born 1935), German writer
- Susanne Schädlich (born 1965), German writer and literary translator

== See also ==
- Schadler
