= 2007 Liechtenstein local elections =

- 28 January 2007

The 2007 Liechtenstein local elections were held on 28 January to elect the municipal councils and the mayors of the eleven municipalities of Liechtenstein.

== Electoral system ==
The municipal councils (German: Gemeinderat) are composed of an even number of councillors plus the mayor (German: Gemeindevorsteher). The number of councillors is determined by population count: 6 or 8 councillors for population 1,500, 8 or 10 councillors for population between 1,500 and 3,000, and 10 or 12 councillors for population over 3,000.

Councillors were elected in single multi-member districts, consisting of the municipality's territory, using an open list proportional representation system. Voting was on the basis of universal suffrage in a secret ballot. The mayors were elected in a two-round system. If none of the candidates achieved a majority in the first round, a second round would have been held four weeks later, where the candidate with a plurality would be elected as a mayor.

== Mayoral elections results ==
=== Summary ===
Party	Votes	%	Swing	Mayors	+/–
Progressive Citizens' Party	6,097	50.3	▲2.6	7	▲1
Patriotic Union	6,027	49.7	▲3.9	4	▼1
Invalid/blank votes	2,106	–	–	–	–
Total	14,230	100	–	11	0
Registered voters/turnout	17,880	79.6	▼0.2	–	–
Source: Gemeindewahlen, Statistisches Jahrbuch 2008

=== By municipality ===
Municipality	Electorate	Party	Candidate	Votes	%	Swing
Balzers	2,437	Progressive Citizens' Party	Anton Eberle	1,152	58.4	▲2.2
Balzers	2,437	Patriotic Union	Stefan Wolfinger	749	41.6	▼2.2
Eschen	2,026	Progressive Citizens' Party	Gregor Ott	1,153	72.6	▼1.6
Gamprin	761	Patriotic Union	Donath Oehri	471	75.8	▲6.7
Mauren	1,740	Progressive Citizens' Party	Freddy Kaiser	929	67.6	▲14.8
Planken	225	Patriotic Union	Rainer Beck	116	55.0	New
Planken	225	Progressive Citizens' Party	Petra Walter-Wenzel	95	45.0	▼21.8
Ruggell	1,073	Progressive Citizens' Party	Ernst Büchel	468	51.9	New
Ruggell	1,073	Patriotic Union	Jakob Büchel	434	48.1	▼11.6
Schaan	2,793	Patriotic Union	Daniel Hilti	1,783	86.6	▲32.6
Schellenberg	549	Progressive Citizens' Party	Norman Wohlwend	385	79.4	▲2.8
Triesen	2,299	Progressive Citizens' Party	Günter Mahl	863	51.9	▼7.1
Triesen	2,299	Patriotic Union	Anton Banzer	801	48.1	▲19.8
Triesenberg	1,591	Patriotic Union	Hubert Sele	1,005	76.5	▼3.4
Vaduz	2,386	Progressive Citizens' Party	Ewald Ospelt	1,052	58.4	▲16.6
Vaduz	2,386	Patriotic Union	Werner Hemmerle	749	41.6	▼16.6
Source: Gemeindewahlen, Statistisches Jahrbuch 2008

== Municipal council elections results ==
=== Summary ===
Party	Votes	%	Swing	Seats	+/–
Progressive Citizens' Party	65,474	46.4	▼0.6	51	▼1
Patriotic Union	62,529	44.3	▼0.9	48	▲2
Free List	13,233	9.4	▲2.4	7	0
Total votes	141,236	100	–	106	0
Valid ballots	13,443	–	–	–	–
Invalid/blank ballots	784	–	–	–	–
Total	14,227	–	–	–	–
Registered voters/turnout	17,880	79.6	▼0.2	–	–
Source: Gemeindewahlen, Statistisches Jahrbuch 2008

=== By municipality ===
Municipality	Seats	Electorate	Party	Candidates	Votes	%	Swing	Seats	+/–
Balzers	12	2,437	Patriotic Union	Manfred Frick; Norbert Bürzle; Jürgen Vogt; Roswitha Vogt; Bruno Vogt; Doris Frick; Heini Vogt; Thomas Beck; Albert Vogt; Harald Caduff	10,995	47.7	▼1.6	7	0
Balzers	12	2,437	Progressive Citizens' Party	Helmuth Büchel; Adolf Nigg; Monika Frick-Kranz; Urs Vogt; Stefan Willi; Peter Frick; Marcel Gstöhl; Stephan Gstöhl	9,326	40.5	▼0.5	4	0
Balzers	12	2,437	Free List	Christel Kaufmann	2,731	11.8	▲2.1	1	0
Eschen	10	2,026	Patriotic Union	Kurt Gerner; Werner Bieberschulte; Michael Gerner; Gina Hasler; Toni Schächle; Marie-Louise Arroyave-Batliner; Karl Heinz Risch; Philipp Gstöhl; Cornelia Beck; Jeanette Podlogar-Kranz	7,080	46.5	▼1.4	5	0
Eschen	10	2,026	Progressive Citizens' Party	Daniel Oehry; Benno Gerner; Manfred Meier; Albert Kindle; Reto Meier; Daniel Hofstetter; Gerhard Gerner; Thomas Näf	6,772	44.5	▼7.6	4	▼1
Eschen	10	2,026	Free List	Stefanie von Grünigen	1,358	8.9	New	1	New
Gamprin	8	761	Progressive Citizens' Party	Erna Näscher-Hasler; Peter Oehri; Hermann Müssner; Dagmar Gadow; Monika Büchel; Annelies Bruhin-Oehry; Herbert Malin	2,571	55.8	▲2.1	5	0
Gamprin	8	761	Patriotic Union	Wolfgang Oehri; Vroni Sprecher; Rudolf Oehri; Robert Kaiser; Dietmar Hasler	2,037	44.2	▼2.1	3	0
Mauren	10	1,740	Progressive Citizens' Party	Michael Ritter; Lothar Ritter Jr. Walburga Matt; Robert Matt; Irene Mündle; Reto Kieber; Doris Wohlwend; Horst Zech; Christian Kaiser; Max Bühler	7,241	57.2	▼1.1	6	0
Mauren	10	1,740	Patriotic Union	Theo Oehri; Claudia Kaiser; Otto Matt; Gerald Meier; Carmen Felah-Walser; Wolfgang Ritter	3,864	31.9	▼2.0	3	0
Mauren	10	1,740	Free List	Ingrid Allaart-Batliner	1,805	10.9	▲3.1	1	0
Planken	6	225	Progressive Citizens' Party	Monika Stahl-Kerber; Günther Jehle; Daniel Schierscher; Gerhard Hermann	581	46.1	▼5.9	3	0
Planken	6	225	Patriotic Union	Horst Meier; Claudio Lübbig	240	22.6	▲13.8	2	▲1
Planken	6	225	Free List	Christian Beck; Katja Langenbahn	220	17.5	▼8.0	1	▼1
Ruggell	8	1,073	Progressive Citizens' Party	Maria Kaiser-Eberle; Norman Walch; Alois Hoop; Marco Öhri; Monika Büchel; Hans Oehri; Kurt Schnitzer; Ruth Riedlechner	3,974	55.1	▼0.2	4	▼1
Ruggell	8	1,073	Patriotic Union	Peter Biedermann; Roland Hilti; Denise Büchel; Martin Oehry; Rita Hasler; Marco Lampert; Alois Hoop; Hannes-Peter Frommelt	3,242	44.9	▲0.2	4	▲1
Schaan	12	2,793	Progressive Citizens' Party	Hubert Hilti; Albert Frick; Wally Frommelt; Arnold Frick; Margot Retuga-Walser; Dagobert Oehri; Rainer Frick; Ernst Weiss; Klaudia Zechner-Schwärzler	9,821	41.9	▼3.4	6	0
Schaan	12	2,793	Patriotic Union	Karin Rüdisser-Quaderer; Jack Quaderer; Rudolf Wachter; Walter Frick; Peter Hilti; Christoph Lingg; Manfred Beck; Peter Nigg; Jürgen Gritsch; Judith Davida-Morscher	10,957	46.7	▲2.2	5	0
Schaan	12	2,793	Free List	Manuela Haldner-Scierscher	2,682	11.4	▲1.2	1	0
Schellenberg	8	549	Progressive Citizens' Party	Hansjörg Risch; Gilbert Wohlwend; Karin Brendle; Robert Hassler; Reinold Hasler; Andreas Gassner; Johanna Elkuch; Aurelia Schädler-Zacharias	2,070	56.7	▼0.3	5	▲1
Schellenberg	8	549	Patriotic Union	Dietmar Lampert; Mario Wohlwend; Marianne Hasler; Edy Hassler; Heinz Gstöhl; Rainer Beck; Barbara Rodigari; Daniela Meier-Eggenberger	1,478	43.0	▼9.4	3	▼1
Schellenberg	8	549	Free List	Robert Büchel-Thalmaier	355	9.7	New	0	New
Triesen	10	2,299	Patriotic Union	Gebhard Negele; Eva Johann-Heidegger; Eernst Trefzer; Max Gross; Uwe Bargetze; Peter Strunk; Max Schädler; Piero Sprenger; Patrik Schurte; Susanne Hug-Nutt	7,233	45.0	▲0.3	5	0
Triesen	10	2,299	Progressive Citizens' Party	Albert Kindle; Florin Banzer; Ralph Beck; Remy Kindle; Marco Sprenger; Hansjörg Frommelt; Peter Kindle; Stefanie Schurte-Tschol; Ruth Kindle-Banzer; Franz-Josef Beck	7,444	46.3	▼0.1	4	0
Triesen	10	2,299	Free List	Edgar Bargetze	1,403	8.7	▼0.3	1	0
Triesenberg	10	1,591	Patriotic Union	Erich Sprenger; Franz Beck; Walter Beck; Angelika Stöckel; Karla Hilbe-Eberle; Leander Schädler; Cristoph Beck; Berno Beck	6,552	51.8	▼1.3	5	0
Triesenberg	10	1,591	Progressive Citizens' Party	Rainer Schädler; Mario Bühler; Anton Frommelt; Hanspeter Gassner; Felix Beck; Elsbeth Tarnutzer-Lampert; Marlen Schädler; Ludwig Schädler	5,389	42.6	▲6.0	5	▲1
Triesenberg	10	1,591	Free List	Werner Schädler	719	5.7	New	0	New
Vaduz	12	2,386	Patriotic Union	Frank Konrad; Thomas Zwiefelhofer; Brigitte Schweiger-Hartmann; Alice Hagen-Ospelt; Patrick Heeb; Patrick Vogt; Markus Hemmerle; Roland Moser; Roland Ospelt; Ewald Wolf; Sandra Nigg-Amann; Rainer Kühnis	8,887	42.1	▼3.1	6	▲1
Vaduz	12	2,386	Progressive Citizens' Party	Susanne Eberle-Strub; Daniel Ospelt; Markus Verling; Engelbert Schreiber; Heinz Dörig; Florin Kofler; Hugo Hasler; Markus Meier; Hansrudi Sele; Pascal Seger; Maria Frei-Nipp; Karl-Heinz Dürr	10,285	48.7	▲2.4	5	▼1
Vaduz	12	2,386	Free List	René Hasler	1,826	8.5	▼0.8	1	0
