= Emanuel Schädler =

Liechtenstein government councillor (born 1983)

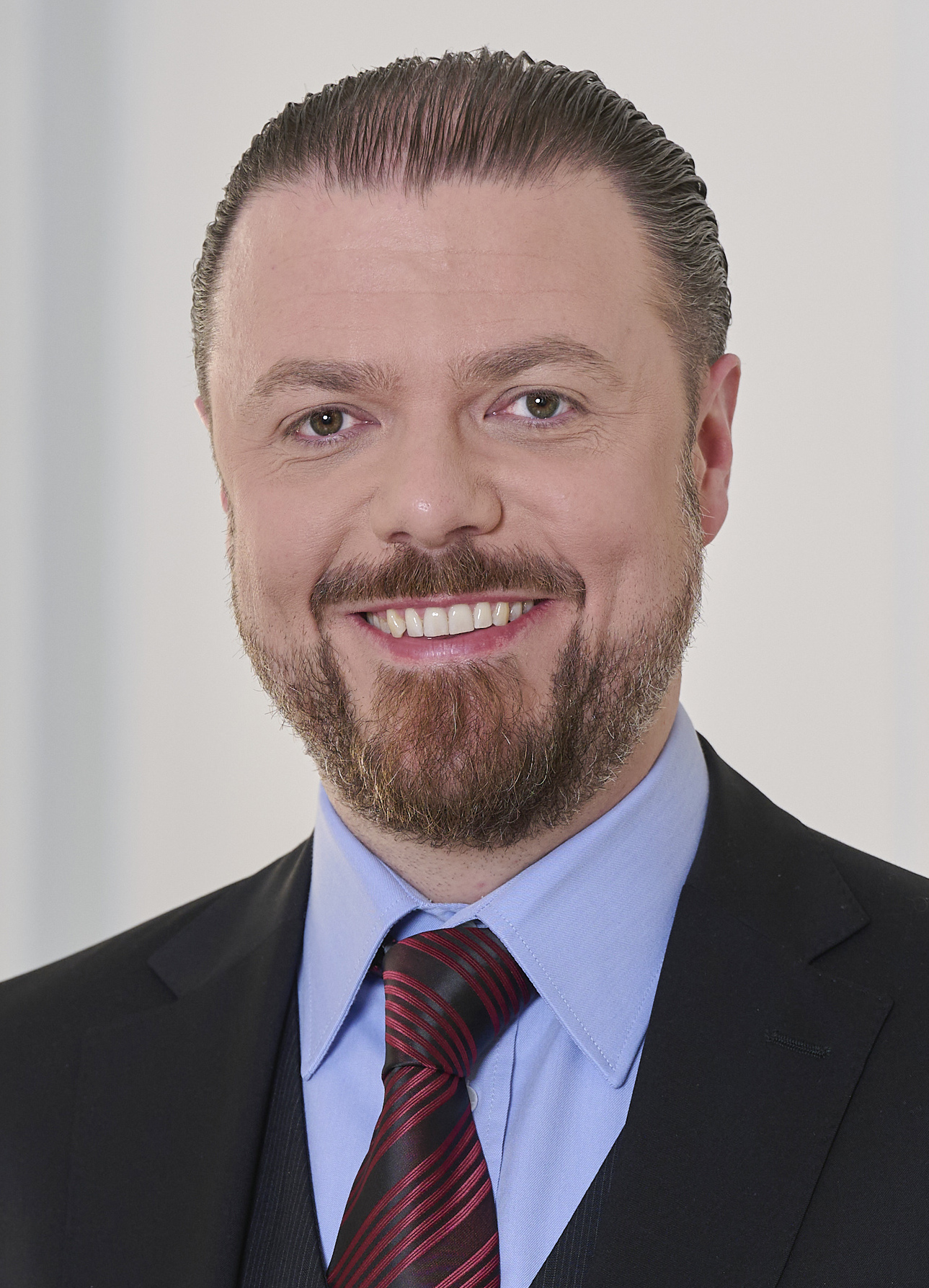
- Official portrait, 2025

Government councillor for Justice and Society
- Incumbent
- Assumed office 10 April 2025
- Prime Minister: Brigitte Haas
- Deputy: Norma Heidegger

Personal details
- Born: 26 December 1983 (age 42) Altstätten, Switzerland
- Party: Patriotic Union
- Spouse: Monika Gluderer (m. 2014)
- Children: 1

Emanuel Schädler (born 26 December 1983) is a historian and politician from Liechtenstein who has served as a government councillor since 2025, with the roles of society and justice.

== Life ==
Schädler was born on 26 December 1983 in Altstätten as the son of bricklayer Georg Schädler and teacher Alice (née Hoop) as one of two children. He attended the Liechtensteinisches Gymnasium before studying law at the University of Bern, where he graduated in 2009 with a Master of Law, then receiving a doctorate in 2013. He was a research assistant at the Romance Studies Institute and the Institute for Legal History at the University of Bern from 2009 to 2013.

From 2015 to 2024, Schädler was a research officer at the Liechtenstein Institute, focusing on the law department. He was also the head of the publishing house of the Liechtenstein academic society from 2016 to 2024. During this time, he was published numerous works on legal, constitutional, religious and administrative history. He was a senior assistant at the University of Bern for legal history from 2019 to 2024.

Schädler was nominated by the Patriotic Union as a government candidate on 19 August 2024. As part of the coalition government formed following the 2025 Liechtenstein general election, he was appointed as a government councillor with the roles of society and justice, which he has served since 10 April 2025.

Schädler is from Triesenberg, but now lives in Vaduz. He married Monika Gluderer on 24 January 2014 and they have one child together.
