= Alexander Batliner =

President of the Progressive Citizens' Party since 2024

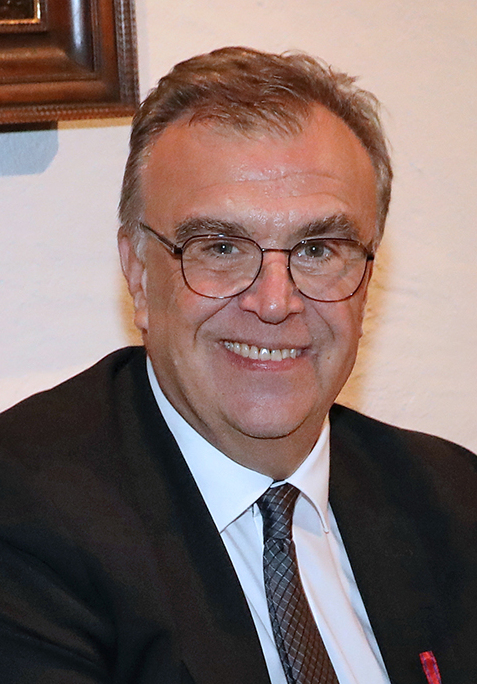
- Batliner in 2025

Member of the Landtag of Liechtenstein for Unterland
- In office 6 November 2019 – 7 February 2021
- Preceded by: Johannes Hasler

President of the Progressive Citizens' Party
- Incumbent
- Assumed office 16 September 2024
- Vice President: Eva-Maria Bechter (Oberland); Thomas Hasler (Unterland)
- Preceded by: Daniel Oehry
- In office 2009 – August 2013
- Vice President: Elmar Kindle
- Preceded by: Johannes Matt
- Succeeded by: Elfried Hasler

Personal details
- Born: 24 October 1967 (age 59) Chur, Switzerland
- Party: Progressive Citizens' Party
- Spouse: Birgit Heeb (m. 2001)
- Relations: Martin Risch (great-uncle); Christian Batliner (cousin)
- Children: 2

Alexander Batliner (born 24 October 1967) is a politician from Liechtenstein who served in the Landtag of Liechtenstein from 2019 to 2021. He has been the President of the Progressive Citizens' Party since 2024, having previously served from 2009 to 2013.

== Life ==
Batliner was born on 24 October 1967 in Chur as the son of lawyer and trustee Herbert Batliner and Rita (née Bühler) as one of four children. He grew up and attended elementary school in Vaduz before attending school in Vilters-Wangs and Oberägeri. From 1988 to 1998 he studied German, journalism and communication sciences and the University of Bern and University of Freiburg, where he graduated with a Licentiate.

He worked as a journalist at the newspaper Liechtensteiner Volksblatt and was its editor from 1999 to 2001. Since 2001, he has been owner and managing director of Alexander Batliner Est, a public relations company in Mauren. Additionally, he has made numerous commentative publications on the history of Liechtenstein companies and associations. He was a board member of Radio Liechtenstein from 2004 to 2006 and since 2018 has been the president of the Peter Kaiser memorial foundation.

Batliner was the president of the Progressive Citizens' Party (FBP) from 2009 to August 2013, when he resigned due to disagreements with prime minister Adrian Hasler regarding minimum income tax. He was a deputy member of the Landtag of Liechtenstein from 2017 until on 6 November 2019 he succeeded Johannes Hasler as a full member following his resignation, and he was a full member until 2021. Batliner was a deputy government councillor under Sabine Monauni from March to August 2021, when he resigned citing personal reasons.

In 2023, Batliner was the leading opponent against the introduction of mandatory photovoltaic panels on non-residential buildings and a reform of energy efficiency standards proposed by Monauni. In September 2023 he formed a popular initiative against them and in the subsequent referendums on 21 January 2024 both proposals were rejected by voters.

In August 2024 FBP president Daniel Oehry resigned in order to become a government candidate in the 2025 Liechtenstein general election. As a result, Batliner again became president of the FBP the following month. Due to this, in addition to the FBP nominating Ernst Walch as its candidate for prime minister for the election, the Liechtensteiner Vaterland described Batliner's presidency as the "conservative wing taking over again". In the election, the FBP achieved its lowest result in its history. As a result, Batliner has announced his intention to restructure the FBP ahead of the 2029 election.

== Personal life ==
Batliner married Birgit Heeb, a former ski racer, on 1 September 2001 and they have two children together. He lives in Mauren. He is the grandson of Eduard Batliner and the great-nephew of Martin Risch. His cousin Christian Batliner also served in the Landtag.
