= Walter Frick =

Liechtenstein politician (born 1956)

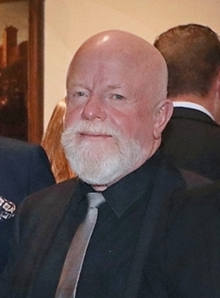
- Frick in 2024

Member of the Landtag of Liechtenstein for Oberland
- In office 7 February 2021 – 9 February 2025

Personal details
- Born: 4 July 1956 (age 69); Vaduz, Liechtenstein
- Political party: Patriotic Union
- Spouse: Sylvia Siegrist (m. 1988)
- Children: 2

Walter Frick (born 4 July 1956) is a politician from Liechtenstein who served in the Landtag of Liechtenstein from 2021 to 2025.

== Life ==
Frick was born on 4 July 1956 in Vaduz as the son of Erwin Frick and Lina (née Perotto) as one of five children. He attended elementary school in Schaan and then secondary school in Vaduz. From 1973 to 1976 he conducted an apprenticeship as a bricklayer and then attended a social education course in Zurich. From 1989 to 2021 he was the group leader and department head at the special education centre in Schaan. He also works as a winemaker.

From 2007 to 2019 he was a member of the Schaan municipal council as a member of the Patriotic Union. From 2021 to 2025, he was a member of the Landtag of Liechtenstein. He has been a proponent for the banning of fossil fuel heating in Liechtenstein.

Frick married Sylvia Siegrist on 8 August 1988 and they have two children together. He lives in Schaan.
