= Schedl =

Schedl is a German surname. Notable people with the surname include:

- Gerhard Schedl (1957−2000), Austrian composer
- Karl E. Schedl (1898–1979), Austrian entomologist, specialist on Coleoptera
- Klaus Schedl (born 1966), German composer
- Paul Schedl (born 1947), American Professor of Molecular Biology at Princeton University
- Timothy Schedl (born 1955), American professor of genetics at Washington University in St. Louis

== See also ==
- Schedel
