= Hubert Büchel (politician) =

Liechtenstein government councillor (born 1973)

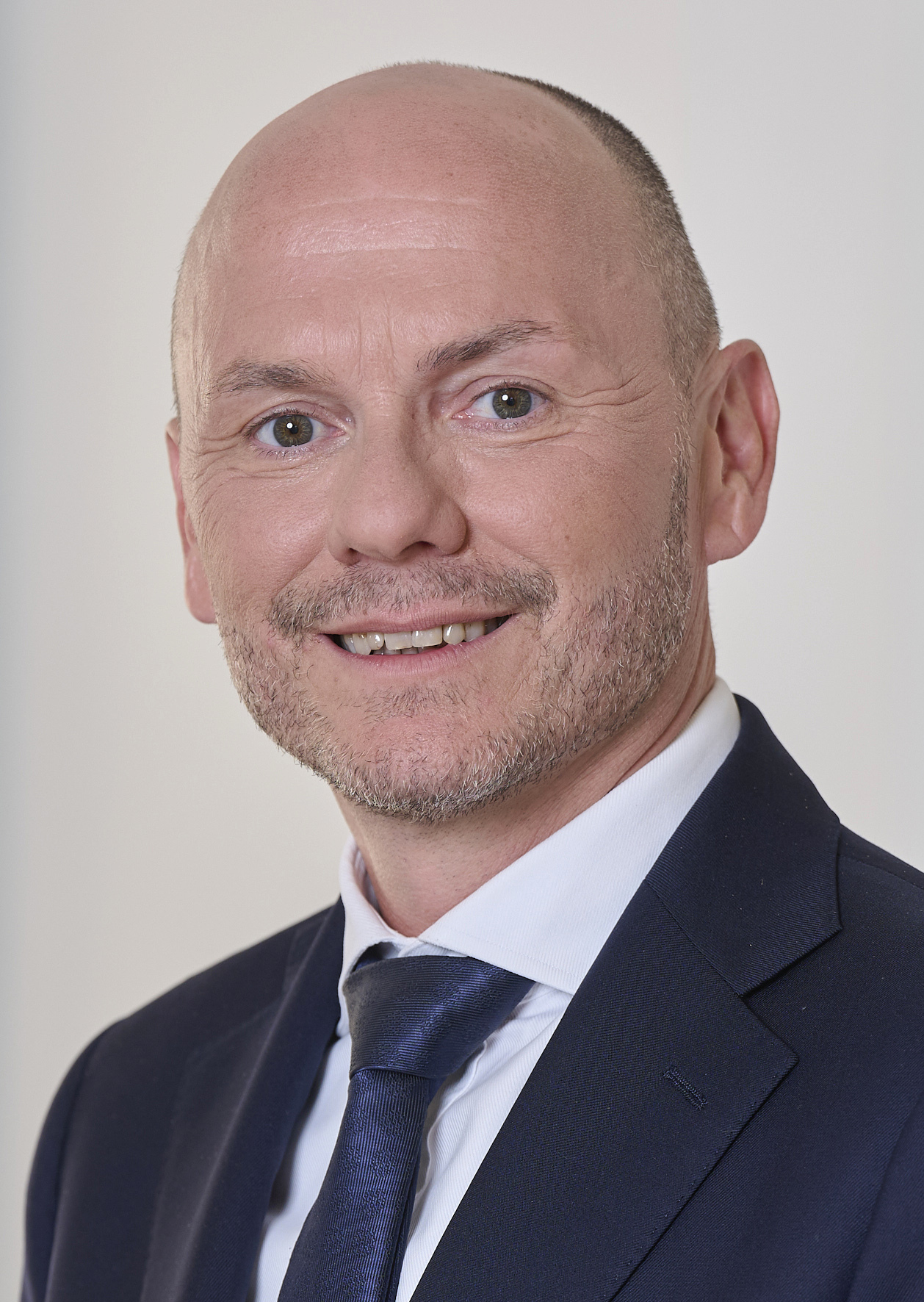
- Official portrait, 2025

Government councillor for Interior, Economy and Sport
- Incumbent
- Assumed office 10 April 2025
- Prime Minister: Brigitte Haas
- Deputy: Orlando Wanner

Personal details
- Born: 24 October 1973 (age 52) Grabs, Switzerland
- Party: Patriotic Union
- Spouse: Petra Zimmermann (divorced)
- Children: 1

Hubert Büchel (born 24 October 1973) is a banker and politician from Liechtenstein who has served as a government councillor since 2025, with the roles of the interior, economy, and sport.

== Life ==
Büchel was born on 24 October 1973 in Grabs as the son of Franz Büchel and Hedwig (née Büchel) as one of nine children. He attended primary school in Ruggell and then secondary school in Eschen before conducting a commercial apprenticeship at the National Bank of Liechtenstein from 1989 to 1993. From 2001 to 2003 he studied private banking at University of Liechtenstein, and then wealth management at the university from 2007 to 2008.

He worked at the National Bank of Liechtenstein from 1993 to 2001, at Serica Bank AG in Vaduz from 2001 to 2004, and then at the Swiss Bank Corporation from 2004 to 2010. From 2010 to 2019 he worked as Bank Frick in Balzers as head of private banking, and also member of the executive board from 2015. During this time, he was responsible for creating the bank's branch in the United Kingdom. In 2021 he founded Büchel Advisory GmbH, which he owned until 2025. He was also CEO of GN Finance AG in Vaduz from 2021 to 2025.

Büchel was a deputy government councillor from 2009 to 2013, under prime minister Klaus Tschütscher. He was a deputy member of the Landtag of Liechtenstein from 2021 to 2025 as a member of the Patriotic Union. Büchel was nominated by the Patriotic Union as a government candidate on 19 August 2024. As part of the coalition government formed following the 2025 Liechtenstein general election, he was appointed as a government councillor with the roles of the interior, economy, and sport, which he has served since 10 April 2025.

He married Petra Zimmermann and they had one son together, but they got divorced at an unspecified time. He lives in Ruggell.
