= Harold Schedlich =

Australian rules footballer, born 1915

Personal information
- Full name: Harold Murray Schedlich
- Born: 5 September 1915; Mannum, South Australia
- Died: 9 October 2003 (aged 88); Naracoorte, South Australia
- Height: 188 cm (6 ft 2 in)
- Weight: 80 kg (176 lb)

Playing career^{1}
Years	Club	Games (Goals)
1947	St Kilda	3 (1)
- ^{1} Playing statistics correct to the end of 1947.

Harold Murray Schedlich (5 September 1915 – 9 October 2003) was an Australian rules footballer who played with St Kilda in the Victorian Football League (VFL).

After 3 games with St Kilda in 1947, Schedlich moved to Yarrawonga in 1949.
