= Daniel Oehry =

Liechtenstein politician (born 1971)

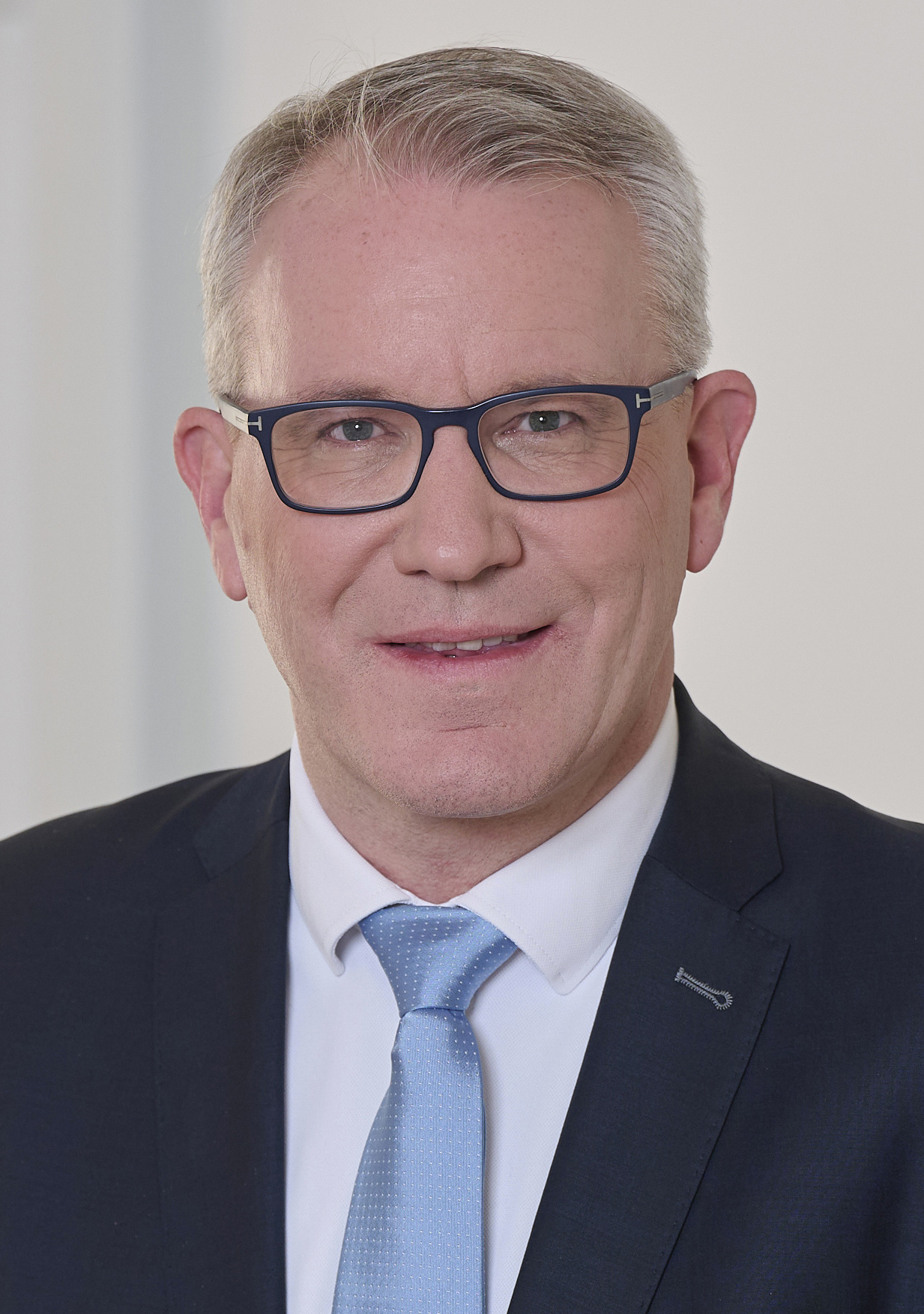
- Official portrait, 2025

Government councillor for Education and Infrastructure
- Incumbent
- Assumed office 10 April 2025
- Prime Minister: Brigitte Haas
- Deputy: Andreas Haber

Member of the Landtag of Liechtenstein for Unterland
- In office 5 February 2017 – 9 February 2025
Additional offices
President of the Progressive Citizens' Party
In office 30 November 2023 – 16 September 2024
Vice President	Judith Hoop (Oberland); Thomas Hasler (Unterland)
Preceded by	Rainer Gopp
Succeeded by	Alexander Batliner

Personal details
- Born: 20 February 1971 (age 55) Grabs, Switzerland
- Party: Progressive Citizens' Party
- Spouse: Sybille Hoop (m. 1997)
- Children: 2

Daniel Oehry (born 20 February 1971) is a politician from Liechtenstein who has served as a government councillor since 2025. He previously served in the Landtag of Liechtenstein from 2017 to 2025 and also as president of the Progressive Citizens' Party from 2023 to 2024.

== Life ==
Oehry was born on 20 February 1971 in Grabs, Switzerland as the son of postman Anton Oehry and Hannelore (née Schreiber) as one of three children. He attended primary school in Ruggell, and then secondary school in Eschen. From 1987 to 1991 he conducted an apprenticeship as a designer at Hilti in Schaan, and has worked at the company since 1992 as a project manager. From 1992 to 1996 he studied mechanical engineering in Vaduz.

From 2003 to 2011 Oehry was a member of the Eschen municipal council. From 2017 to 2025 he was a member of the Landtag of Liechtenstein as a member of the Progressive Citizens' Party, and the party's spokesman in the Landtag from 2017 to 2023. From 30 November 2023 to 24 September 2024 he was the president of the FBP. Oehry was a candidate for government in the 2025 Liechtenstein general election. Due to this, he resigned as president of the FBP and was succeeded by Alexander Batliner.

Since 2025, Oehry has been a government councillor with the roles of infrastructure and education.

Since 2013, he has been the vice president of Winzer am Eschnerberg in Mauren and from 2015 to 2024 he was a board member and treasurer of the Unterländer Wintersportvereins.

Oehry married Sybille Hoop on 17 May 1997 and they have two children together.
