= Lillian Schoedler =

Lillian Schoedler (1891 - 1963) was a diarist and secretary of the New York City Intercollegiate Bureau of Occupations, which eventually became the Bureau of Vocational Information. Schoedler's diary provides insight into the government agency from the early 20th century, as well as what it was like to be a secretary in that era. She died in August 1963 in a car accident.
