= Josef Maria Schedel =

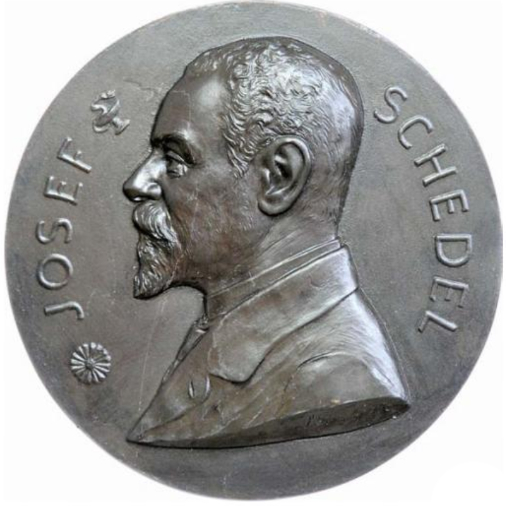
The 1925 medal for Schedel

Josef Maria Schedel (10 January 1856 – 7 April 1943) was a German apothecary, naturalist and collector. He worked in Japan and China from where he collected natural history specimens particularly of molluscs and art for German collectors.

== Life and work ==
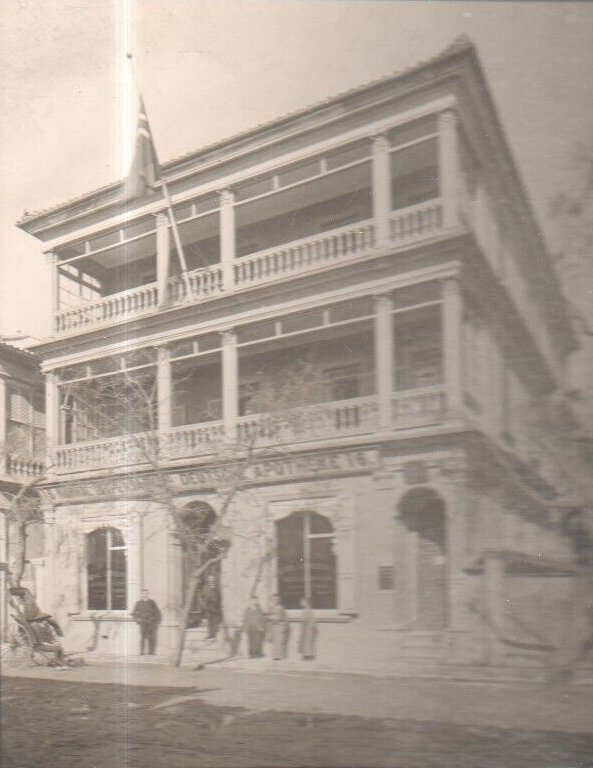
Deutsche Apotheke, Yokohama, c. 1900

Schedel was born out of wedlock in Bamberg to physician Heinrich Heinkelmann (1807–1866) and Justina Wilhelmina Schedel (1837–1857), daughter of a Bamberg lawyer. His mother died shortly after his birth and he was raised by a laundress. He went to high school and then apprenticed at the Einhorn pharmacy from 1873. In 1880 he went to study natural sciences in Munich and in the next year he went to the University of Kiel and became a chemical assistant to August Friedrich Karl Himly. In 1884 he became a pharmacist near Charlottenburg. In 1886 he went to Japan to work with the Japan Dispensary Brett & Co and after his contract ended he purchased a French pharmacy that he converted to his own Deutsche Apotheke in Yokohama. He was a member of the German society for natural history and ethnology of east Asia and a friend of Otto Keil and German agent August Langfeldt. He returned to Germany in 1899 and gave talks about his experiences in Japan. In 1900 he moved to Munich and ran a pharmacy there but closed down in 1902 following attempted blackmail for homosexuality. He then moved through Bavaria and in 1909 and then moved to work in Tientsin, China. He did not like work conditions and his health was poor. In addition China declared war on Germany in 1917 and with serious nervous disorders he returned to Germany in 1922. He lived in seclusion in Bamberg until his death.

Schedel was a friend of Magnus Hirschfeld, who founded the Scientific-Humanitarian Committee (WHC) in 1897. Schedel was invited to speak on homosexuality in Japan at the WHC in 1903. He also collected Japanese erotica. In 1925 he was awarded the "Bene merenti" medal of the Bavarian Academy of Sciences for his Chinese antiquities donated to the museum in Munich.
