= Norma Heidegger =

Liechtenstein politician (born 1961)

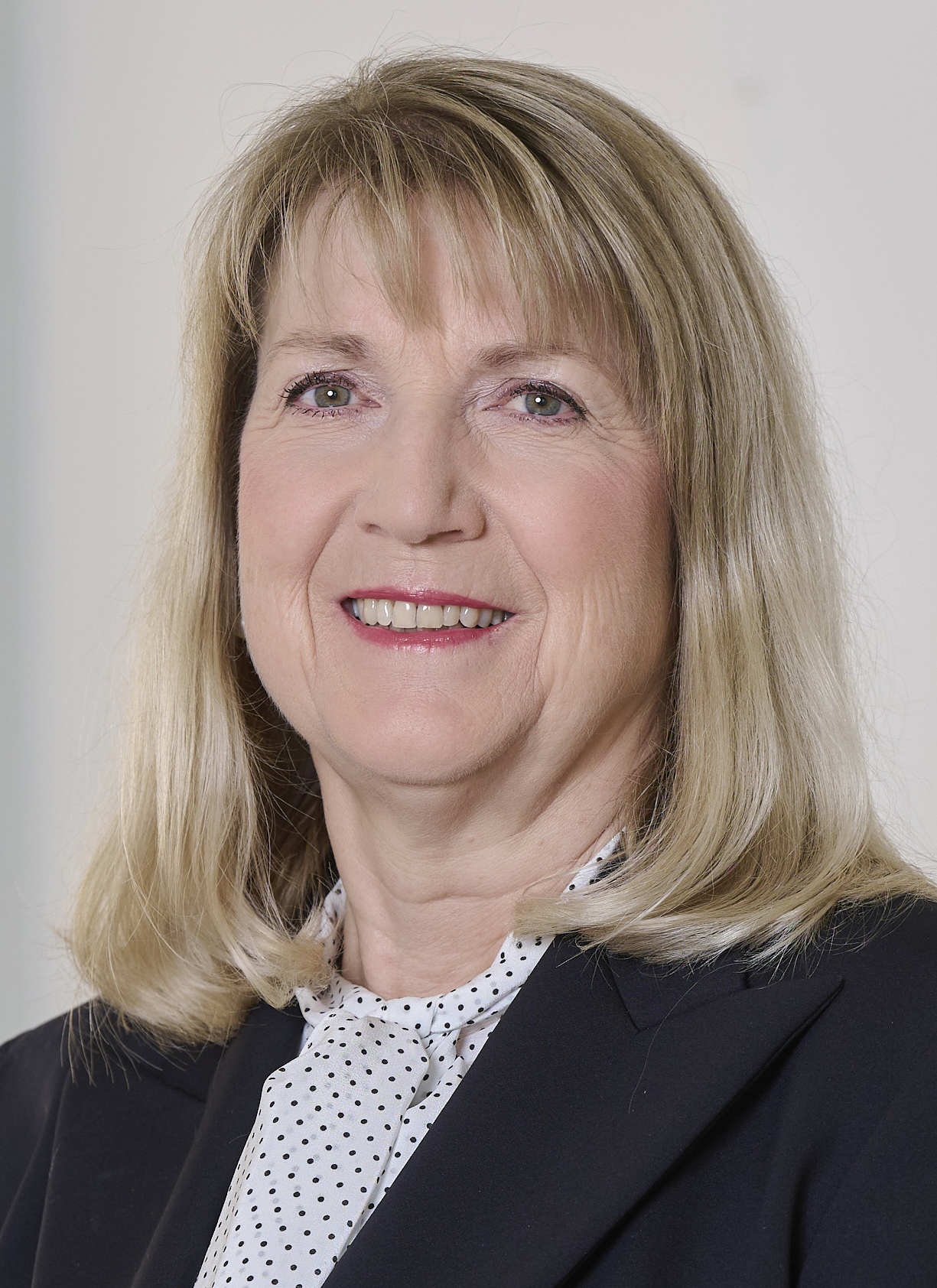
- Official portrait, 2025

Member of the Landtag of Liechtenstein for Oberland
- In office 7 February 2021 – 9 February 2025

Personal details
- Born: 17 September 1961 (age 64) Chur, Switzerland
- Party: Patriotic Union
- Children: 1

Norma Heidegger (born 17 September 1961) is a politician from Liechtenstein who served in the Landtag of Liechtenstein from 2021 to 2025.

== Life ==
Heidegger was born 17 September 1961 in Chur as the daughter of Werner Heidegger and Ruth Foser as one of two children. She attended primary school in Triesen and then secondary school in Schaan. She trained as a pharmaceutical assistant at the KV business school in Chur from 1977 to 1980, and worked as one at Schloss-Apotheke in Vaduz from 1977 to 1984.

From 1996 to 2010 she was an assistant to the management of Oerlikon Balzers. In 2005, she obtained a degree in business administration in Sargans. Since 2010, she has been an assistant to the management of the board of directors at the Liechtenstein power plants.

From 2021 to 2025, Heidegger was a member of the Landtag of Liechtenstein and also the head of the Liechtenstein delegation to the Organization for Security and Co-operation in Europe. She unsuccessfully ran for re-election in 2025. Since April 2025, she has been the deputy government councillor to Emanuel Schädler.

Heidegger got divorced in 1995 and has one child. She lives in Triesen.
