= Abraham Schedel =

Bohemian printer and corrector

Abraham ben Moses Schedel (fl. c. 1600) was a Bohemian printer and corrector for the press.

== Biography ==
Schedel was initially employed as proof-reader in the printing establishment of Mordekhai Cohen. In 1602, he and his brothers Judah Löb and Azriel founded the Schledel family press in the home of Hayyim ben Jacob ha-Kohen. Their first publication was a Yiddish paraphrase of the Bible entitled Maʾase yetziat Mitzrayim (1602–1906). They also published Ḥelkat meḥokek ('Portion of the Lawgiver'; 1606–1607), a commentary on the Passover Haggadah by their father, the preacher and dayyan Rabbi Moses ben Abraham (1585–1605).

He also met with some success in authorship. He translated the Book of Ezekiel into Yiddish rime, and printed it in his own establishment in 1602. He also contributed to the field of Yiddish folk-songs.
