= Daniel Risch =

Prime Minister of Liechtenstein from 2021 to 2025

His Excellency Daniel Risch
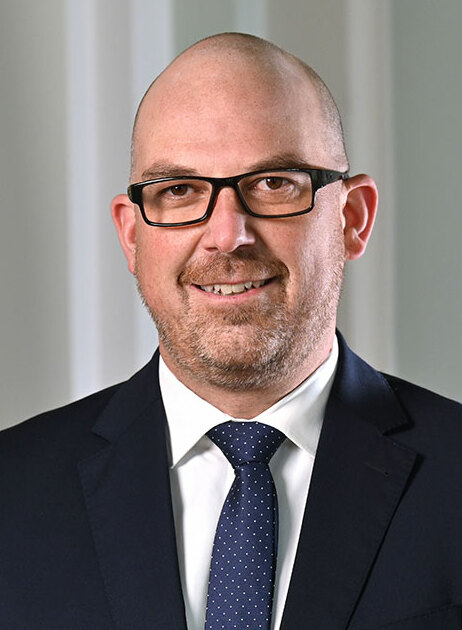
- Official portrait, 2021

Prime Minister of Liechtenstein
- In office 25 March 2021 – 10 April 2025
- Monarchs: Hans-Adam II; Alois (regent)
- Deputy: Sabine Monauni
- Preceded by: Adrian Hasler
- Succeeded by: Brigitte Haas

Deputy Prime Minister of Liechtenstein
- In office 30 March 2017 – 25 March 2021
- Monarchs: Hans-Adam II; Alois (regent)
- Prime Minister: Adrian Hasler
- Preceded by: Thomas Zwiefelhofer
- Succeeded by: Sabine Monauni

Personal details
- Born: 5 March 1978 (age 48) Grabs, Switzerland
- Party: Patriotic Union
- Spouse: Jasmin Schädler
- Relations: Peter Sprenger (uncle)
- Children: 2
- Daniel Risch's voice Risch speaks on his position of the legalisation of cannabis. Recorded September 2018

Daniel Risch (German pronunciation: [ˈdaːniːɛl ˈʁɪʃ]; born 5 March 1978) is a politician from Liechtenstein who served as the Prime Minister of Liechtenstein from 2021 to 2025. He was previously the Deputy Prime Minister from 2017 to 2021, under the government of Adrian Hasler.

== Early career ==
Risch attended Liechtenstein Grammar School in Vaduz from 1990 to 1998, and received a business baccalaureate. He later studied business administration at the Swiss universities of St. Gallen and Zurich, as well as LMU Munich from 1999 to 2003. He graduated with a degree in economics (lic. oec. publ.) from the University of Zurich.

Risch then started doctoral studies in business informatics at the University of Freiburg in 2004, and from 2006 to 2007 was a visiting scholar at the University of Melbourne as part of a research stay. During this period, he also worked as a lecturer at the University of Applied Sciences of Northwestern Switzerland. He completed his studies at Freiburg in 2007 and received a doctorate in economics (dr. rer. pol.).

From 2007, he was the Project Manager, Head of Sales and Chief Marketing Officer at Unic AG, an e-business consulting company, in Zurich and Bern. From 2015 until entering government in 2017, he worked as Chief Marketing Officer at Liechtensteinische Post.

From 2015 to 2017, he was a board member at a Liechtensteiner forum for information and communications technology (IKT Forum Liechtenstein).

== Prime Minister of Liechtenstein ==
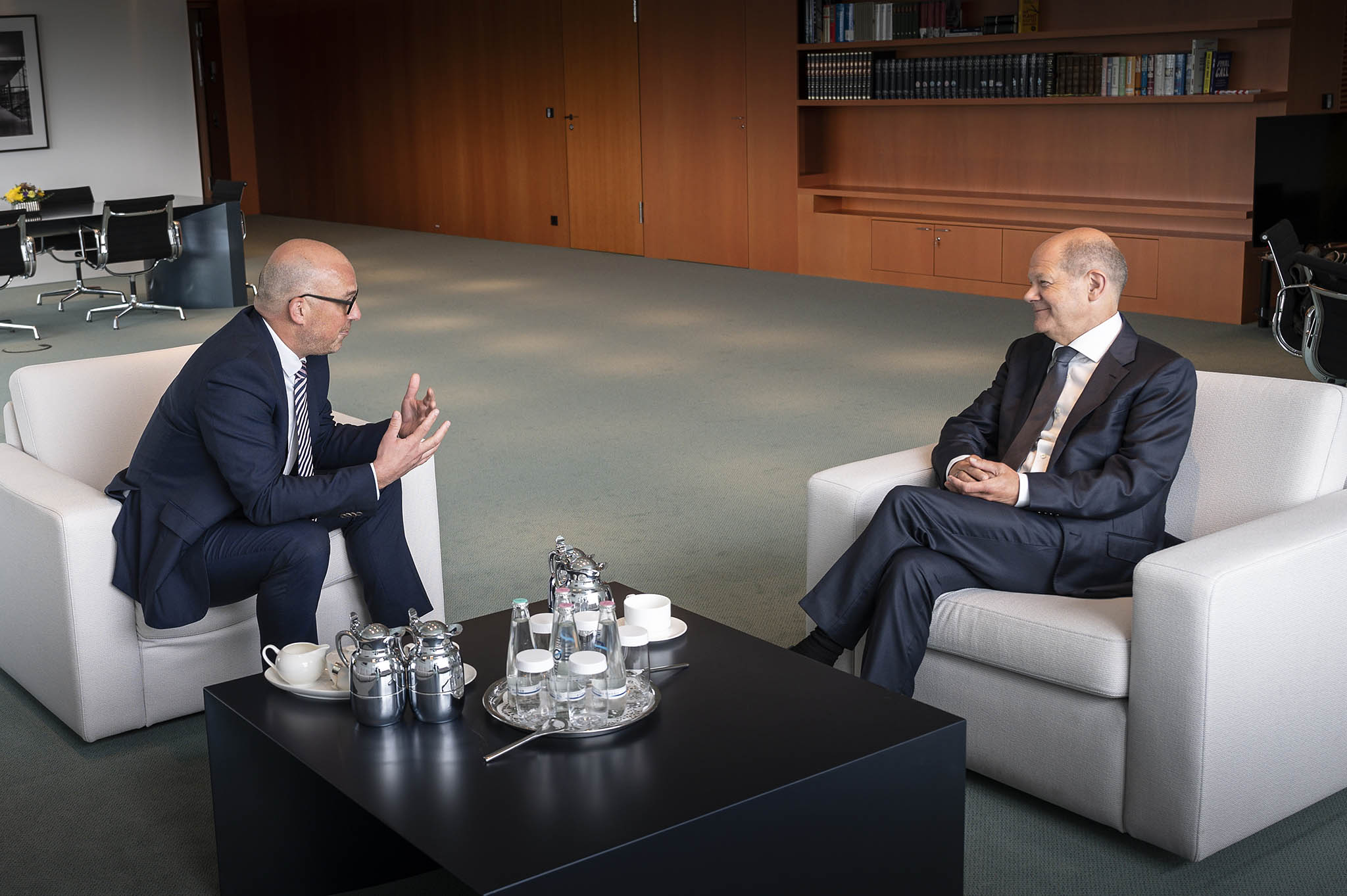
Risch meets with German Chancellor Olaf Scholz in May 2022.

Risch was a candidate for government in the 2017 Liechtenstein general election as a member of the Patriotic Union. Following the resignation of Thomas Zwiefelhofer, Risch was appointed as Deputy Prime Minister of Liechtenstein on 30 March 2017 in a renewed coalition government between the Patriotic Union and Progressive Citizens' Party. As deputy prime minister, he was also a government councillor with the roles of infrastructure, economy, and sport.

He was the Patriotic Union's candidate for Prime Minister of Liechtenstein in the 2021 Liechtenstein general election. During the campaign, Risch stated that he would not be a part of the next government should the party loose the election. The election resulted in a virtual tie between the Patriotic Union and Progressive Citizens' Party. As a result, Risch was appointed as prime minister on 25 March 2021 in a renewed coalition government between the two parties. As prime minister, he also held the role of finance minister.

Risch has supported increased cooperation and integration between the European Union and European Free Trade Association, in addition to further progress to cut down on greenhouse gas emissions. His government has spearheaded Liechtenstein's support for Ukraine in the wake of the Russian invasion of Ukraine, starting in February 2022. He was a signatory of the June 2024 Ukraine peace summit.

From November 2023 to May 2024 Liechtenstein held the Presidency of the Committee of Ministers of the Council of Europe, headed by foreign minister Dominique Hasler. Risch, together with Hasler, started the government-funded Book of Europe project in spring 2024, during Liechtenstein's presidency of the Council of Europe. In the book, the heads of government of the 46 members of the council were asked to write their thoughts and vision of Europe, which 33 did so. The book was published in February 2025.

During his term in office, in November 2022, the Landtag of Liechtenstein passed a motion calling on the government to introduce a bill legalizing same-sex marriage, with broad support from across the political spectrum. A bill legalizing same-sex marriage was introduced in February 2024 and passed its final reading in the Landtag on 16 May 2024 by a 24–1 vote.

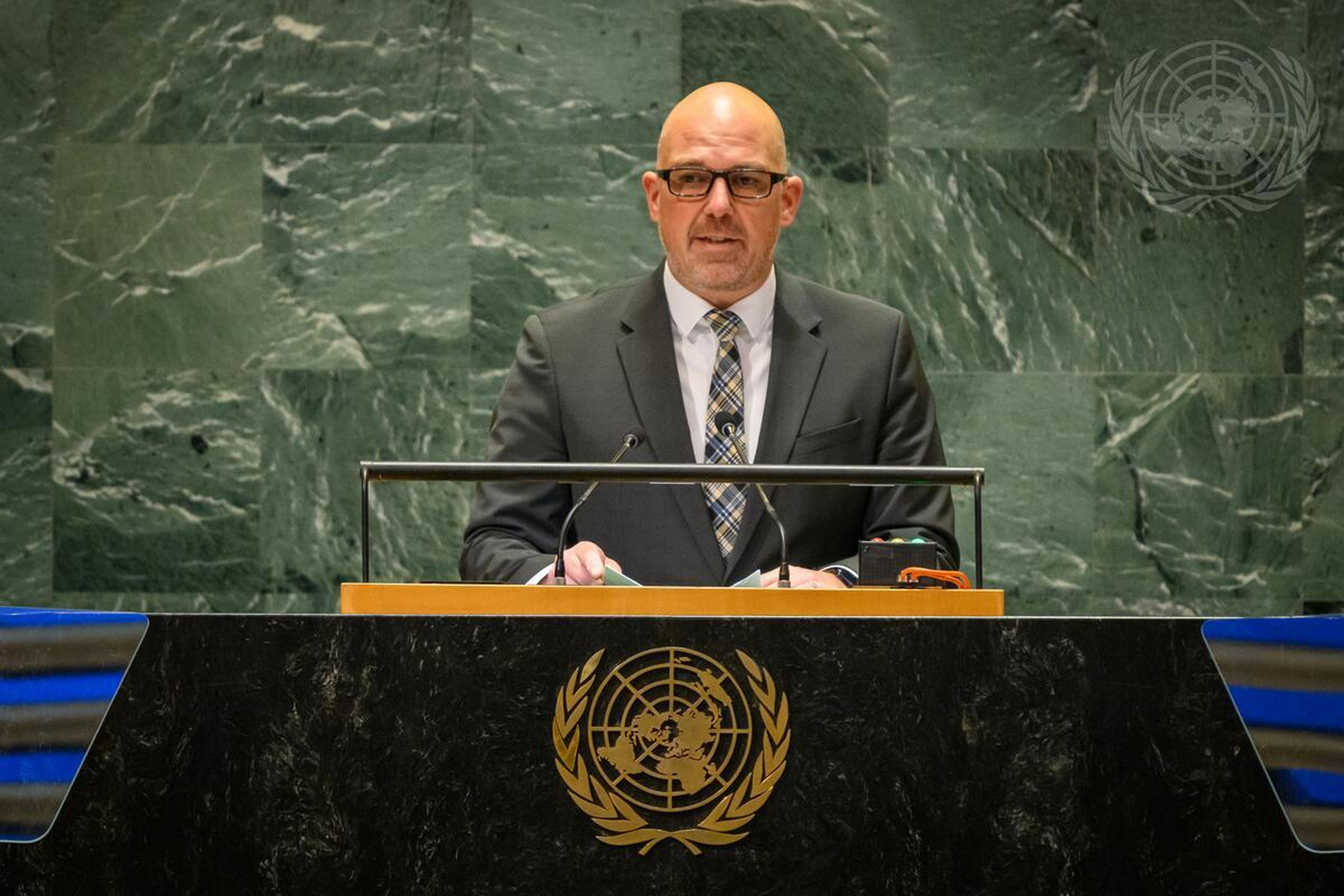
Risch addressing the United Nations General Assembly on 26 September 2024

He was a prominent advocate for Liechtenstein's accession to the International Monetary Fund, and his government started the proceedings for it in 2024. Liechtenstein joined the IMF on 21 October 2024. This came after a successful referendum was held the previous month.

Risch opposed the privatization of Radio Liechtenstein in an referendum on the topic in October 2024. Despite this, the Patriotic Union voted to support the privatization and the subsequent referendum was accepted by voters. Radio Liechtenstein was subsequently closed in April 2025 due to a lack of a concrete plan regarding the privatization as well as no political decision being made regarding an extension of the deadline to do so.

In February 2024, Risch announced that he would not be running for re-election in the 2025 Liechtenstein general election. He was succeeded by Brigitte Haas on 10 April 2025.

== Later life ==
In October 2025, Risch founded t minus 5 GmbH based in Triesen, and has served as its CEO since. In February 2026, he was elected to the board of trustees of the Swiss United Nations High Commissioner for Refugees.

== Personal life ==
Since 2009, Risch has been a member of the Founding Committee, Organising Committee and Patronage Body of the FL1.LIFE festival in Schaan.

Risch married Jasmin Schädler and they have two children together. He lives in Triesen.

== Honours ==
- Austria: Grand Decoration of Honour in Gold (2024)
- Liechtenstein: Grand Cross of the Order of Merit of the Principality of Liechtenstein (2025)

== See also ==
- Politics of Liechtenstein
- Daniel Risch cabinet
