= Katrin Eggenberger =

Liechtenstein politician & minister for foreign affairs

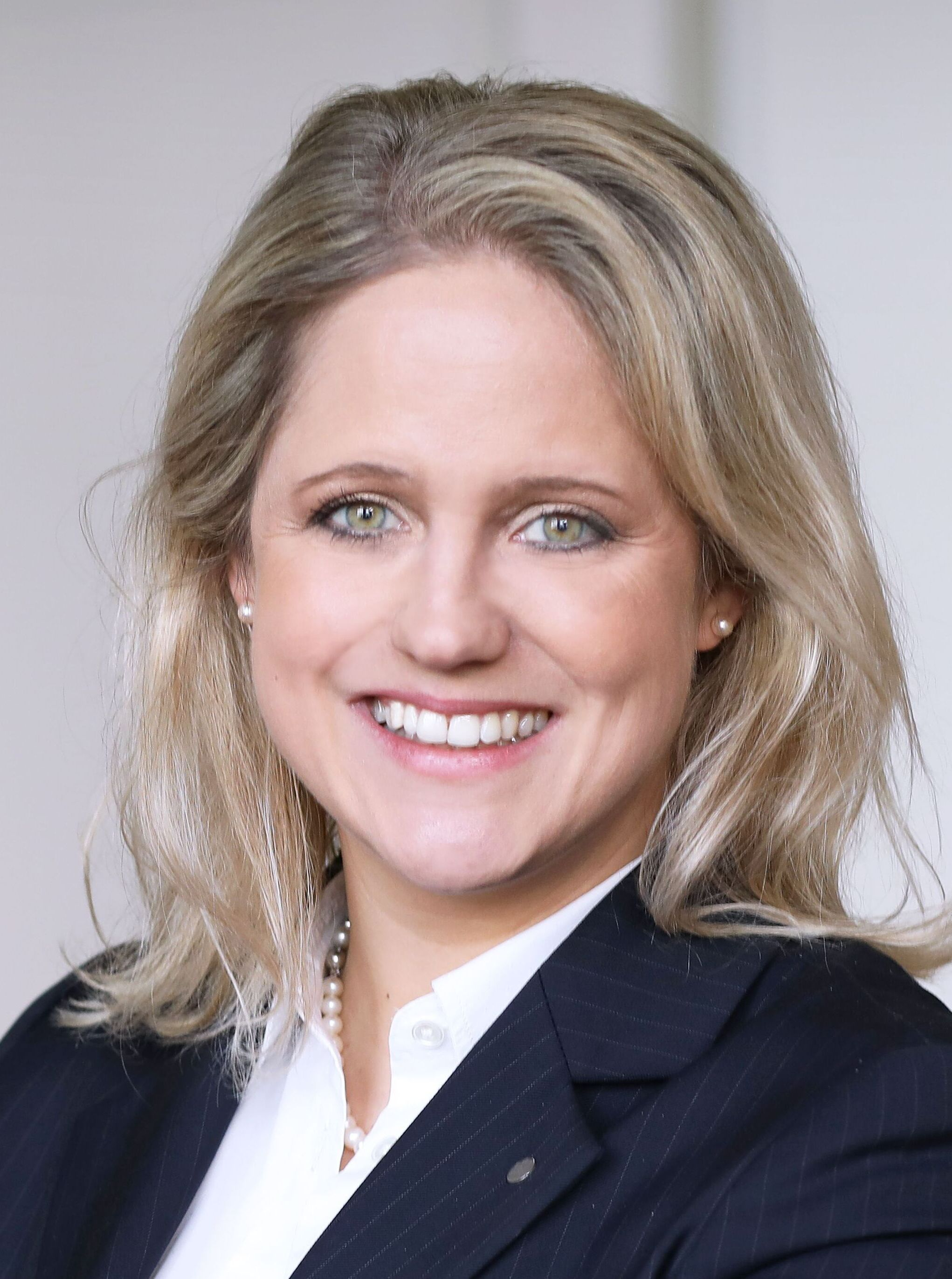
- Official portrait, 2020

Minister of Foreign Affairs, Education, and Culture
- In office 11 November 2019 – 25 March 2021
- Monarch: Alois (Regent)
- Prime Minister: Adrian Hasler
- Preceded by: Aurelia Frick
- Succeeded by: Dominique Hasler

Personal details
- Born: 8 September 1982 (age 44) Werdenberg, Switzerland
- Party: Progressive Citizens' Party
- Education: University of Liechtenstein; University of St. Gallen

Katrin Eggenberger (born 8 September 1982) is a Swiss-Liechtensteiner academic and politician who served as the Foreign Minister of Liechtenstein from November 2019 to March 2021.

== Education and personal life ==
Katrin Eggenberger was born in Werdenberg, Switzerland to a Swiss father and Liechtensteiner mother. Her maternal uncle, Josef Biedermann, was a long-term member of the Liechtenstein parliament and former President of the Progressive Citizens' Party. She is a dual citizen, however she has spent the majority of her life living outside Liechtenstein. She returned to live in Vaduz permanently in October 2019.

Eggenberger completed a Bachelor of Business Administration in 2008 through the University of Liechtenstein, studying at Ohio State University where she also competed in synchronized swimming. She competed in synchronized swimming for Switzerland alongside Ariane Schneider at the 2005 World Aquatics Championships in Montreal.

Eggenberger completed a Master of Science in Banking and Financial Management in 2012 at the University of Liechtenstein. In 2019 she completed a PhD in International Affairs and Political Economy from the University of St. Gallen, supervised by Nobel laureate Joseph Stiglitz, and has been a researcher at the London School of Economics, University of Cambridge, Princeton University and Harvard University. She was a 2019 Maurice R. Greenberg World Fellow at the Jackson Institute for Global Affairs at Yale University. In 2020, she completed a mid-career MPA from Harvard Kennedy School.

== Career ==
Eggenberger worked at number of banks in Vaduz and Switzerland before becoming Chief of Staff to Klaus Schwab and Head of the Community of chairpersons at the World Economic Forum in 2016. She was responsible for building a global, digital platform for startups, companies, universities and governments.

Eggenberger has been a member of the Progressive Citizens' Party since 2019, when she was unanimously nominated by the party to the Parliament. She was appointed Minister of Foreign Affairs by Alois, Hereditary Prince of Liechtenstein on 11 November 2019, replacing Aurelia Frick, and sworn in by Prime Minister Adrian Hasler. She was responsible for the ministries of justice and culture as well as foreign affairs. Her completion of the Yale fellowship in 2019 caused her to miss four of her first six government meetings.

== Publications ==
- Eggenberger, Katrin; Emmenegger, Patrick (2015). "Economic Vulnerability and Political Responses to International Pressure: Liechtenstein, Switzerland and the Struggle for Banking Secrecy". Swiss Political Science Review. 21 (4): 491–507. doi:10.1111/spsr.12181.
- Emmenegger, Patrick; Eggenberger, Katrin (2018). "State sovereignty, economic interdependence and US extraterritoriality: the demise of Swiss banking secrecy and the re-embedding of international finance". Journal of International Relations and Development. 21 (3): 798–823. doi:10.1057/s41268-017-0088-y. S2CID 149206725.
- Eggenberger, Katrin (2018). "When is blacklisting effective? Stigma, sanctions and legitimacy: the reputational and financial costs of being blacklisted". Review of International Political Economy. 25 (4): 483–504. doi:10.1080/09692290.2018.1469529. S2CID 158191498.
- Eggenberger, Katrin. Solving Cooperation Problems over International Taxation: Power, Legitimacy and Sovereignty (PDF) (Thesis). University of St. Gallen.
