= Schadler =

Schadler is a surname. Notable people with the surname include:

- Jay Schadler, American television reporter
- Linda Schadler, American materials scientist and academic administrator
- Robert Schadler, American politician and businessman

== See also ==
- Schädler
- Schaller (surname)
