= Sabine Monauni =

Deputy Prime Minister of Liechtenstein since 2021

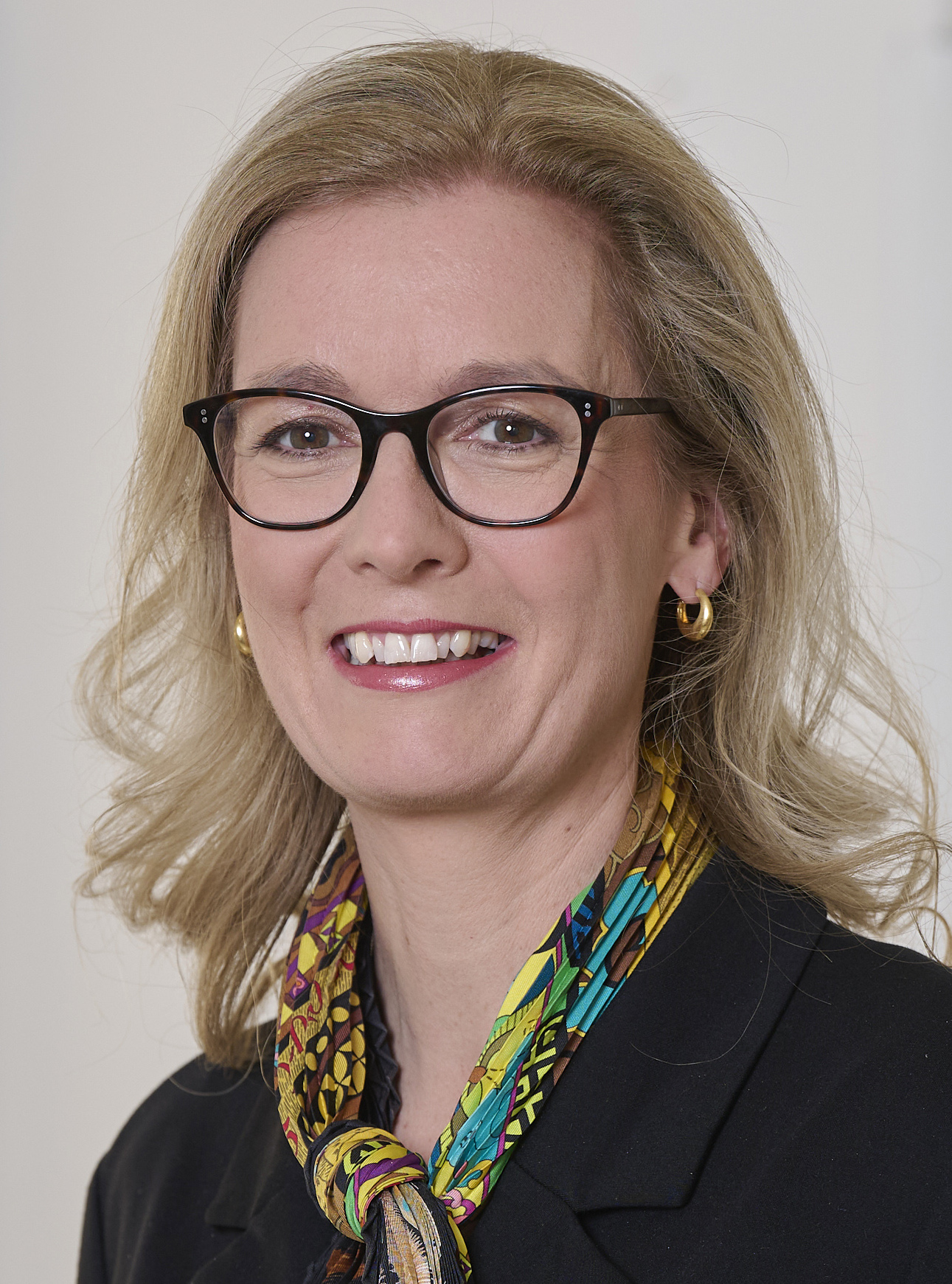
- Official portrait, 2025

Deputy Prime Minister of Liechtenstein
- Incumbent
- Assumed office 25 March 2021
- Monarchs: Hans-Adam II; Alois (regent)
- Prime Minister: Daniel Risch; Brigitte Haas
- Preceded by: Daniel Risch

Personal details
- Born: Sabine Tömördy; 10 April 1974 (age 52) Feldkirch, Austria
- Party: Progressive Citizens' Party
- Spouse: Gian-Reto Monauni (m. 2009)
- Children: 2

Sabine Monauni (née Tömördy; born 10 April 1974) is a politician from Liechtenstein who has served as the deputy prime minister of Liechtenstein since 2021. Since 2025, she has also been the minister of foreign affairs of Liechtenstein.

== Career ==
From 2003 to 2010, Monauni was the deputy head of the EEA staff unit of the Liechtenstein government in Vaduz. She was the ambassador of Liechtenstein to Belgium and the European Union from July 2016 to 2021.

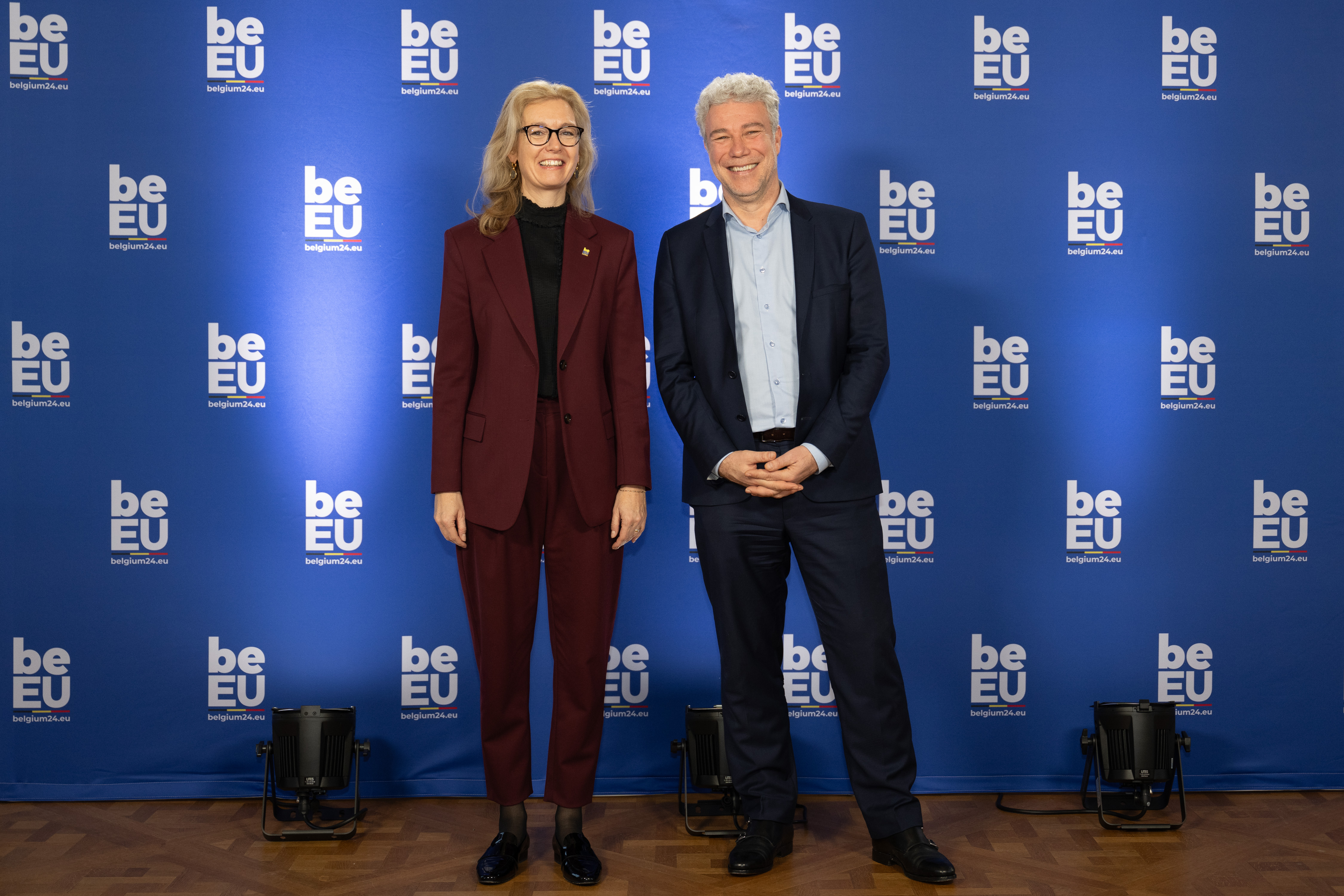
Monauni with Alain Maron in January 2024

In August 2020 she was announced as the Progressive Citizens' Party's candidate for Prime Minister of Liechtenstein, being the first female to do so. The party took a joint-best ten seats in the 2021 general election. As a result, the Progressive Citizens' Party and the Patriotic Union formed a coalition under Daniel Risch as prime minister, with Monauni serving as Deputy Prime Minister of Liechtenstein since 25 March 2021. Additionally, she is also the minister of the interior, economy and environment.

As environment minister, she is an advocate for climate protection in Liechtenstein. In August 2024, she was announced as a government candidate in the 2025 Liechtenstein general election. The election resulted in a win for the Patriotic Union and Monauni retained her position as deputy prime minister in a renewed coalition agreement, under the government of Brigitte Haas. In this position, she holds the roles of foreign affairs, environment and culture.

== Personal life ==
She married Gian-Reto Monauni on 27 March 2009, and they have two children. She lives in Mauren.
