= Brigitte Haas =

Prime Minister of Liechtenstein since 2025

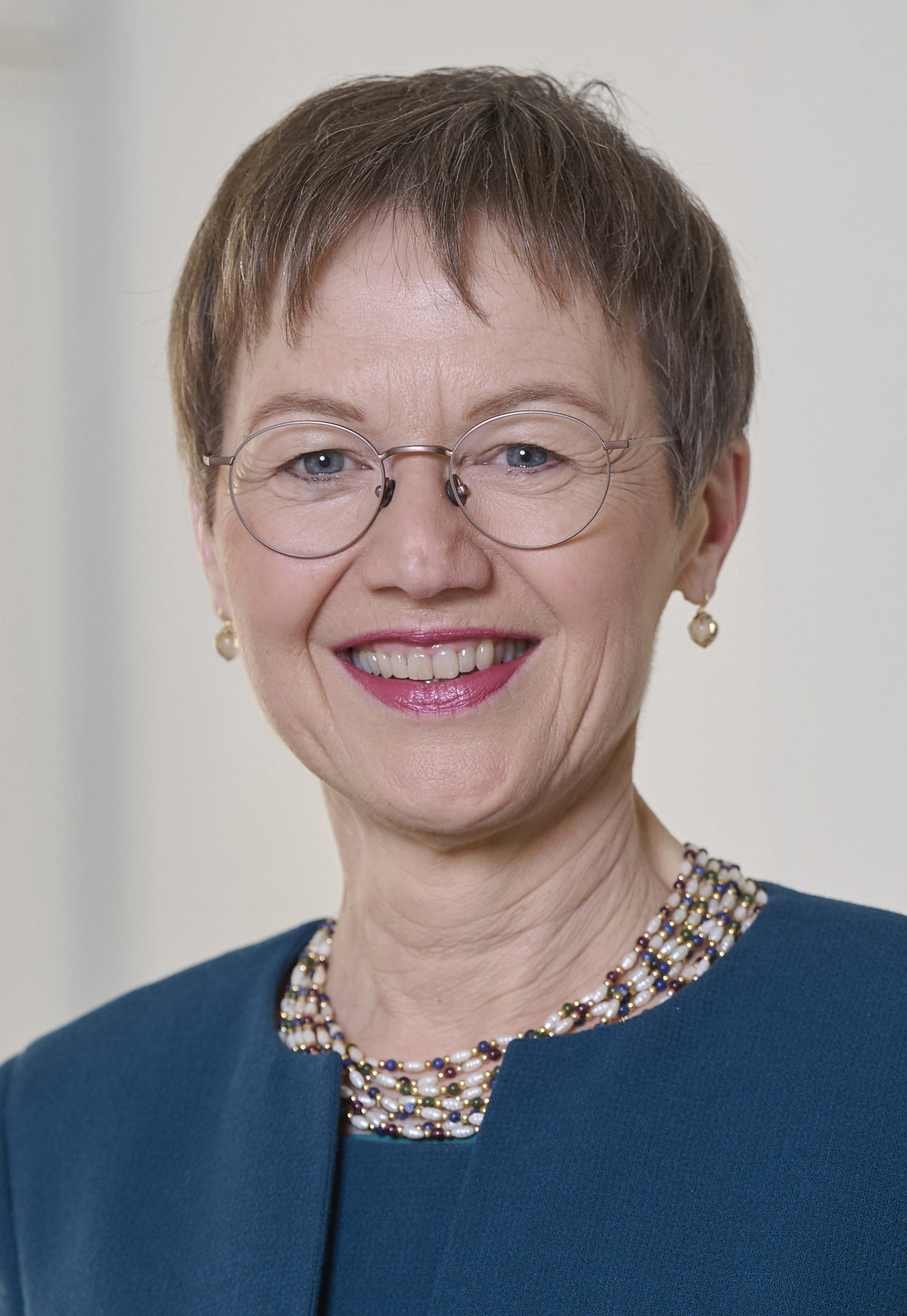
- Official portrait, 2025

Prime Minister of Liechtenstein
- Incumbent
- Assumed office 10 April 2025
- Monarchs: Hans-Adam II; Alois (regent)
- Deputy: Sabine Monauni
- Preceded by: Daniel Risch

Personal details
- Born: 27 December 1964 (age 61) Vaduz, Liechtenstein
- Party: Patriotic Union
- Spouse: Hubert Ospelt

Brigitte Haas (German pronunciation: [bʁiˈɡɪtə ˈhaːs]; born 27 December 1964) is a Liechtensteiner lawyer and politician who has served as the prime minister of Liechtenstein since 2025. She is the first woman to hold the office.

== Early life ==
Brigitte Haas was born on 27 December 1964, in Vaduz, Liechtenstein. She was raised in Schaan. She received commercial training from 1980 to 1983, and Type E federal matura from 1987 to 1990. She graduated with a licentiate from the University of Zurich after studying law from 1995 to 2001.

== Career ==
At the Liechtenstein National Administration Haas worked as an assistant and clerk from 1984 to 1990, and training managers of apprentices from 1995 to 2000. She was the personal assistant to the chief of police from 1991 to 1995. She was Deputy Managing Director of the Liechtenstein Chamber of Commerce and Industry (LIHK) from 2001 to 2019, and Managing Director of the LIHK from 2019 to 2025.

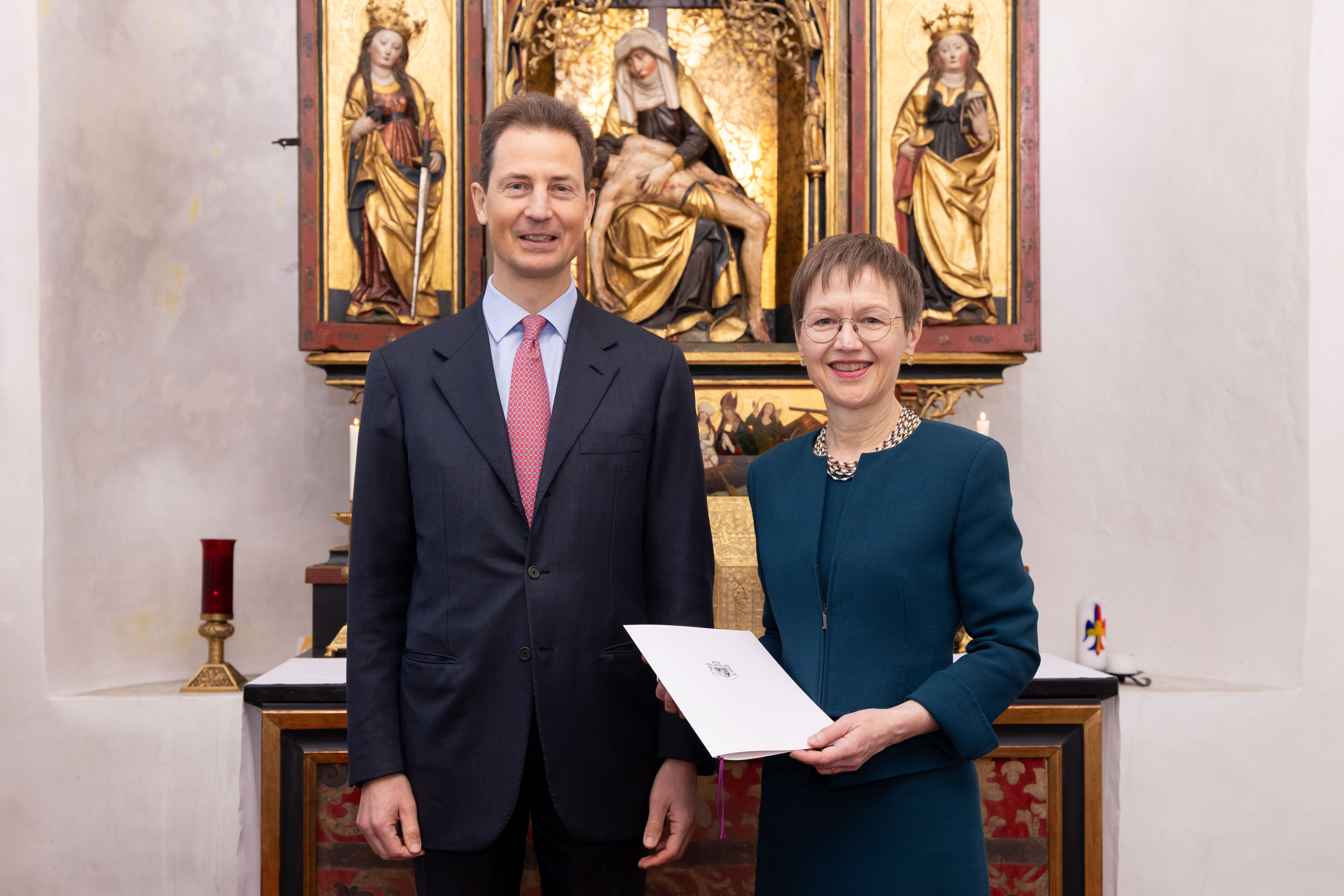
Haas is sworn in before Hereditary Prince Alois at Vaduz Castle, in 2025

=== Politics ===
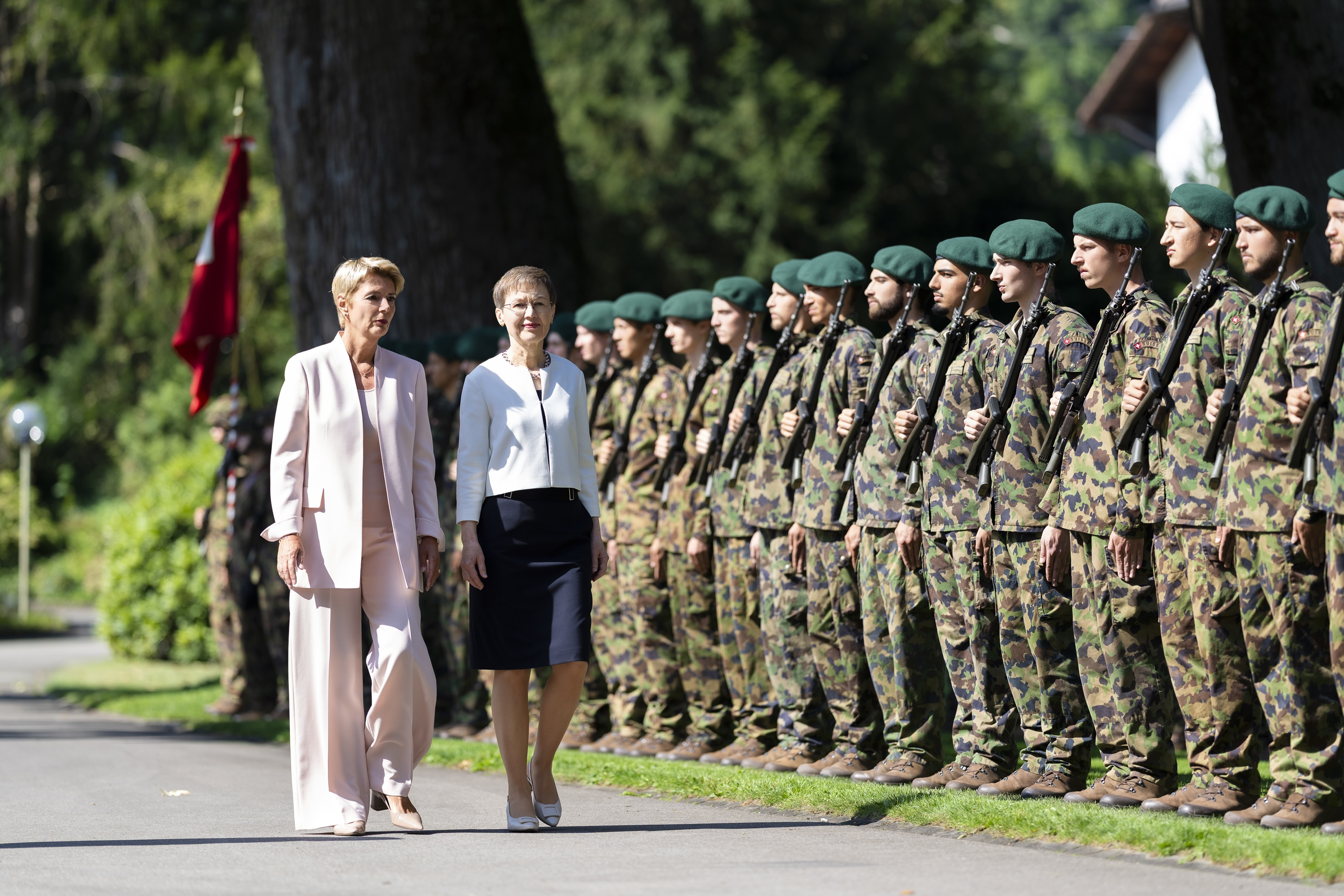
Haas with Karin Keller-Sutter, in Bern, in 2025

Haas has served as a member of the Patriotic Union's (VU) presidium since 2025. Prime Minister Daniel Risch declined to seek another term in the 2025 general election and Haas was the VU's candidate for prime minister. The VU retained its ten seat majority in the Landtag. She is the first woman to serve as prime minister in Liechtenstein.

== Personal life ==
Haas is married to Hubert Ospelt. Her cousin, Wolfgang Haas, was archbishop of Vaduz.

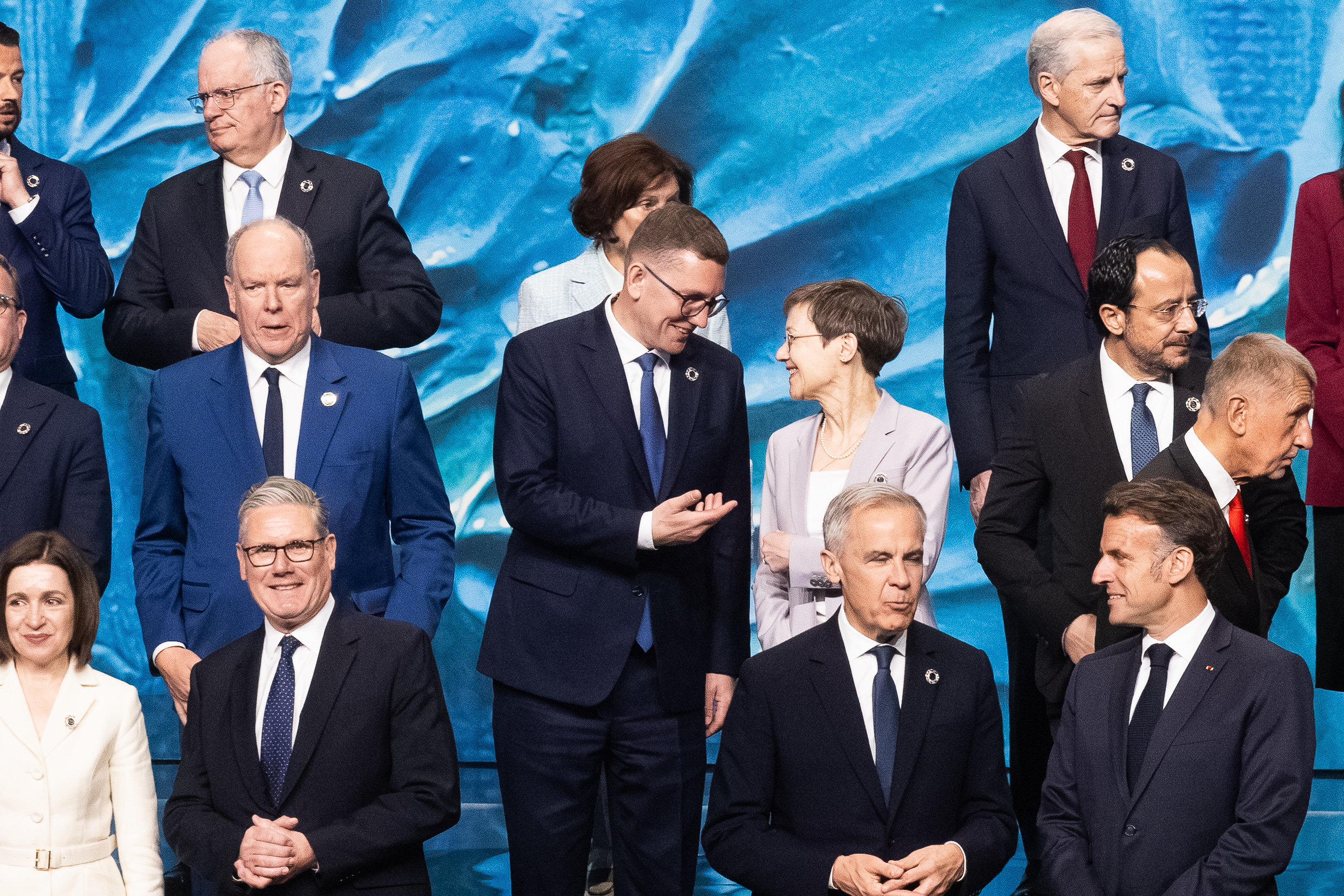
Haas with Kristen Michal and other European leaders at the European Political Community opening ceremony, in 2026

== Political position ==
During the 2025 election Haas stated that she did not intend to institute an inheritance tax or gift tax. She is opposed to privatising Radio Liechtenstein and was against the referendum to privatise it despite VU supporting it.

== Works cited ==
=== News ===
- "Brigitte Haas bleibt beim Nein zum LRF". Radio Liechtenstein. 8 October 2024. Archived from the original on 22 June 2025.
- "Brigitte Haas bleibt bei Ihrer Meinung zum Radio". Radio Liechtenstein. 8 October 2024. Archived from the original on 22 June 2025.
- "Präsentation des VU-Regierungsteams für die Landtagswahlen 2025". Liechtensteiner Vaterland. 19 August 2024. Archived from the original on 19 August 2024.
- "SonnTalk: Duell der Spitzenkandidaten Haas und Walch". Radio Liechtenstein. 12 January 2025. Archived from the original on 22 June 2025.
- "The tiny Alpine principality of Liechtenstein is set to get its first female prime minister". Associated Press. 10 February 2025. Archived from the original on 22 June 2025.
- "Vaduz bleibt in der Familie". Domradio. 12 February 2025. Archived from the original on 22 June 2025.

=== Web ===
- "Brigitte Haas". Patriotic Union. Archived from the original on 22 June 2025.
- "Brigitte Haas". Government of Liechtenstein. Archived from the original on 22 June 2025.
- "Frischer Wind für Liechtenstein". Patriotic Union. 19 August 2024. Archived from the original on 22 June 2025.
