= 1989 Liechtenstein general election =

- 3 and 5 March 1989
- All 25 seats in the Landtag; 13 seats needed for a majority
- Turnout: 90.88% (▼2.42pp)
Party	Leader	Vote %	Seats	+/–
VU	Hans Brunhart	47.15	13	+5
FBP	Herbert Wille	42.13	12	+5
This lists parties that won seats. See the complete results below.
Results by constituency
Prime Minister before	Prime Minister after
Hans Brunhart; VU	Hans Brunhart; VU

General elections were held in Liechtenstein on 3 and 5 March 1989 to elect the 25 members of the Landtag. Early elections were called due to the Progressive Citizens' Party's (FBP) Landtag members resigning in protest to the Patriotic Union (VU) refusing to support an investigation into power abuse by the Liechtenstein state court in 1985 as part of the Kunsthaus case. The VU won thirteen seats and retained its majority, while the FBP won twelve. Voter turnout was 91.8%

The Landtag was expanded from 15 to 25 seats after a successful in referendum in 1988. Incumbent prime minister, Hans Brunhart, of the VU sought re-election for a fourth term, while the FBP nominated deputy prime minister, Herbert Wille, for the position. The election also saw two third parties contest the election; the Free List and the newly-formed Non-Party List (ÜLL), but both parties failed to reach the 8% threshold to win seats in the Landtag. Following the election, the VU and FBP entered into a renewed coalition government, ultimately under the leadership of Brunhart. The new government was sworn in on 5 June 1989. It was the final election where only two parties won seats in the Landtag.

== Background ==
In the 1986 elections, the VU won a majority of eight seats, whereas the FBP won seven. As a result, the VU and FBP formed a coalition government, with Hans Brunhart remaining as prime minister.

A municipal referendum for the building of an art museum in Vaduz was approved in 1980, and then another popular initiative against it succeeded in obtaining enough signatures in 1983. The initiative however, was rejected by the Vaduz municipal council, the government and finally the Liechtenstein state court. In 1984, the organizers behind the initiative successfully appealed for a reconsideration of the state court's ruling. However, president of the state court Erich Seeger overturned the ruling and rejected the consideration, which damaged the reputation of the court and resulted in several resignations.

Though it was found that an abuse of power had taken place, Seeger was acquitted in 1987. In late 1988, the FBP sought form a commission in the Landtag to investigate the power abuse further, but it was rejected by the majority VU; the FBP threatened to propose a motion of no confidence against Brunhart's government, but withdrew at the request of President of the Landtag, Karlheinz Ritter. On 21 December 1988 all of the FBP Landtag members walked out in protest to the rejection of the commission. Talks between the two parties failed in January 1989 failed as neither party agreed to change position. Following the resignation of Brunhart's government, the Landtag was dissolved on 23 January and early elections were called. During this time regent Hans-Adam, Hereditary Prince of Liechtenstein retained Brunhart's government in office with full authority.

== Electoral system ==
The 25 members of the Landtag were elected via open list proportional representation from two constituencies, Oberland with 15 seats and Unterland with 10 seats. Voters voted for a party list and then may have struck through candidates for whom they did not wish to cast a preferential vote, and may also have added names of candidates from other lists. The electoral threshold to win a seat was 8%. Landtag members sit for a four-year term. Once formed, the Landtag elected the prime minister and two government councillors who were then appointed by the reigning prince to govern in a cabinet. Voting was compulsory by law, and those who failed to vote without a valid reason may be fined, but it was not enforced. Citizens over 20 years of age who had been resident in the country for at least one month prior to election day were eligible to vote.

The number of Landtag members was increased from 15 to 25 following a successful referendum in January 1988.

== Campaign ==
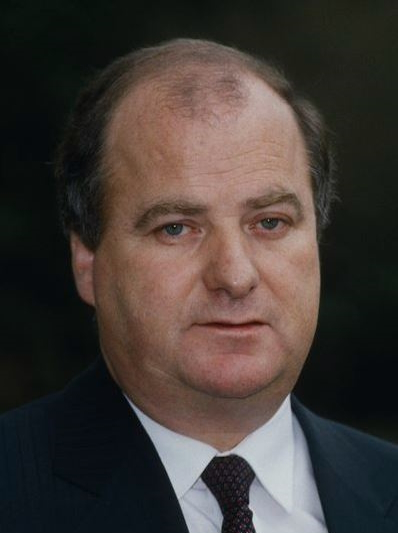
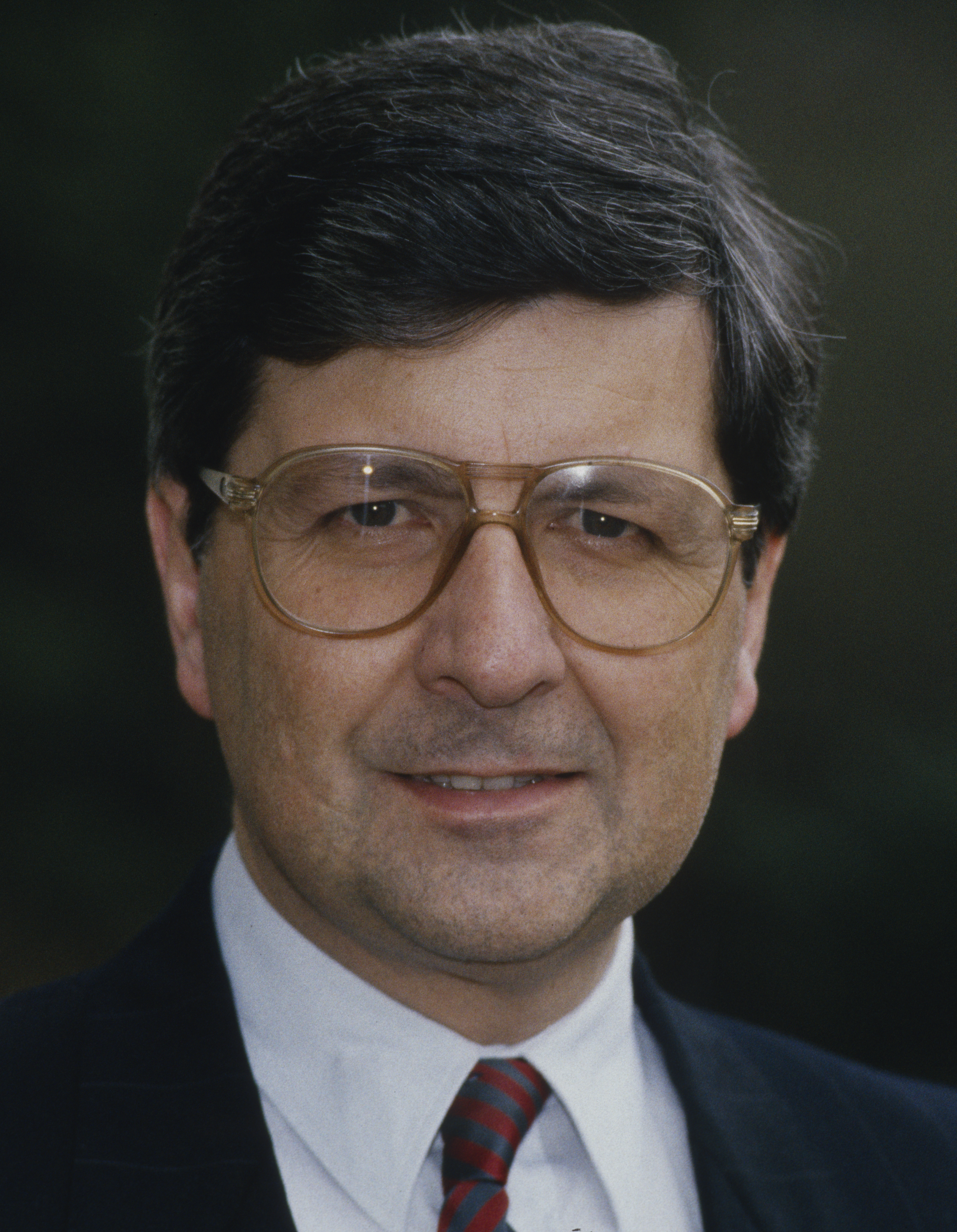
Hans Brunhart (left) and Herbert Wille (right) were the VU and FBP's respective nominations for prime minister

The VU renominated Brunhart for prime minister on 13 February 1989. Additionally, the party nominated incumbent government councillors René Ritter and Peter Wolff as government candidates. The VU blamed the FBP for the dissolution of the Landtag; the VU argued that the establishment of a commission would weaken the independence of the judiciary and that it was unconstitutional. Furthermore, the VU accused the FBP of supposedly contradicting a previous interpretation from 1968, then under the FBP-led government of Gerard Batliner, which supported the VU's position regarding the commission. During the campaign, the VU highlighted its achivements in office, including in introducing women's suffrage and easier naturalisations in Liechtenstein — the party argued that it was responsible for political stability and supported maintaining the coalition government with the FBP. The party's programme included policies such as increased international participation with eventual accession to the United Nations, expanding vocational education, environmental protection, promoting public transport, affordable housing for families, and the establishment of an art school in Liechtenstein.

== Candidates ==
Candidates had the same eligibility criteria as voters. Political parties in Liechtenstein required the support of 30 voters from a constituency to be eligible to nominate a candidate list in it. A total of 70 candidates were presented for the election; 56 men and 14 women.

Oberland	FBP	VU	FL	ULL
Oberland	Josef Biedermann; Rösle Eberle; Louis Gassner; Theo Gassner; Martin Jehle; Johann Kindle; Mario Negele; Alois Ospelt; Gert Risch; Georg Schierscher; Evi Sochin; Anton Vogt; Dieter Walch; Ernst Walch	Karlheinz Ritter; Alfons Schädler; Emma Brogle; Paul Kindle; Helmuth Matt; Georg Vogt; Reinhard Walser; Hildegard Beck; Hans Peter Foser; Walter Schädler; Valerie Schädler; Xaver Schädler; Patrick Hilty; Rita Frick; Franz Wachter	Gerda Bicker; Helen Marxer; Sonja Wachter; Margrit Willie; Ludwig Frommelt; Peter Frommelt; Hilmar Hoch; Hansjörg Hilti; Georg Kaufmann; Wilfred Marxer; Paul Vogt	Leo Sele; Hans Walter Büchel; Rainer Ospelt; Hans-Peter Rheinbeger; Rudolf Schädler; Josef Büchel
Unterland	FBP	VU	FL	ULL
Unterland	Hugo Allgäuer; Josef Büchel; Pius Büchel; Emma Eigenmann; Roland Elkuch; Otmar Hasler; Felix Hassler; Carl Kaiser; Franz Marxer; Heinz Ritter	Hermann Hassler; Günther Wohlwend; Beat Hasler; Karl-Heinz Oehri; Edwin Marxer; Walter Oehry; Helga Schindler; Manfred Biedermann; Irmgard Spalt; Oswald Kranz	Bernd Erne; Toni Ritter	Gerti Marxer
Source: Liechtensteiner Volksblatt

== Results ==
The VU received 47.2% of the vote, a 3% decrease from 1986, and won a majority of thirteen seats. The FBP received 42.1%, a 0.7% decrease from 1986 and won twelve seats. The Free List saw its vote share increase from 7.1% to 7.6% increase but narrowly failed to reach the electoral threshold of 8% to win seats in the Landtag. The ÜLL received 3.2%, and also failed to reach the electoral threshold of 8%.

A total of 11,676 ballots were cast, resulting in a 90.9% voter turnout.

Party	Votes	%	Seats	+/–
Patriotic Union	75,417	47.15	13	+5
Progressive Citizens' Party	67,382	42.13	12	+5
Free List	12,090	7.56	0	0
Non-Party List	5,061	3.16	0	New
Total	159,950	100.00	25	+10
Valid votes	11,957	98.87		
Invalid/blank votes	137	1.13		
Total votes	12,094	100.00		
Registered voters/turnout	13,307	90.88		
Source: Inter-Parliamentary Union

=== By electoral district ===
Electoral district	Seats	Party	Elected members	Substitutes	Votes	%	Seats	+/–
Oberland	15	Patriotic Union	Paul Kindle; Helmuth Matt; Alfons Schädler; Walter Schädler; Reinhard Walser; Georg Vogt; Karlheinz Ritter; Patrick Hilty	Xaver Schädler; Franz Wachter	58,170	48.10	8	▲3
Oberland	15	Progressive Citizens' Party	Josef Biedermann; Dieter Walch; Alois Ospelt; Johann Kindle; Martin Jehle; Georg Schierscher; Ernst Walch	Louis Gassner; Anton Vogt	48,376	40.00	7	▲3
Oberland	15	Free List	–	–	9,830	8.13	0	0
Oberland	15	Non-Party List	–	–	4,554	3.77	0	New
Unterland	10	Progressive Citizens' Party	Emma Eigenmann-Schädler; Otmar Hasler; Josef Büchel; Heinz Ritter; Carl Kaiser	Hugo Allgäuer	18,941	48.82	5	▲2
Unterland	10	Patriotic Union	Günther Wohlwend; Oswald Kranz; Manfred Biedermann; Walter Oehry; Hermann Hassler	Karlheinz Oehri	17,123	44.13	5	▲2
Unterland	10	Free List	–	–	2,228	5.74	0	0
Unterland	10	Non-Party List	–	–	508	1.31	0	New
Source: Liechtensteiner Volksblatt

== Aftermath ==
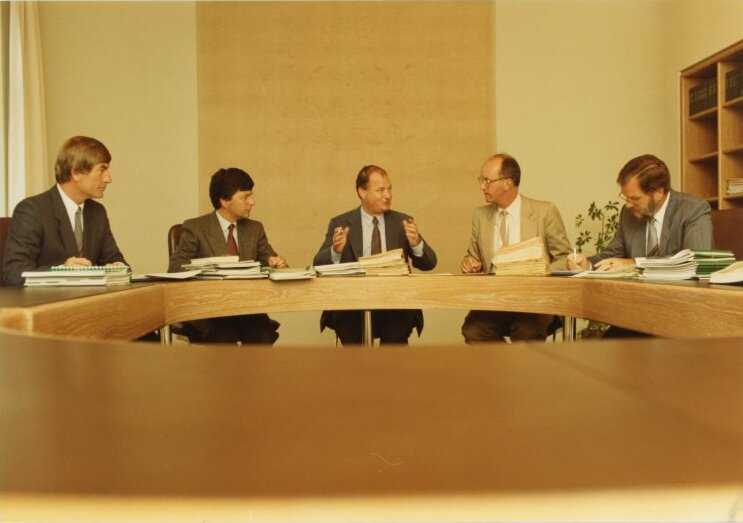
The government of Hans Brunhart

Following the election, the VU invited the FBP to begin negotiations for a renewed coalition government, which the FBP accepted. The two parties entered into a renewed coalition government, though the members were unchanged from the 1986 elections; Brunhart remained as prime minister, and as the junior party in the coalition, Wille remained as deputy prime minister. The new government was sworn in on 5 June 1989. It was the final election where only two parties won seats in the Landtag, as the Free List won seats in the February 1993 elections.
