= Hans Brunhart cabinet =

Hans Brunhart cabinet may refer to:

- First Hans Brunhart cabinet, governing body of Liechtenstein (1978–1982)
- Second Hans Brunhart cabinet, governing body of Liechtenstein (1982–1986)
- Third Hans Brunhart cabinet, governing body of Liechtenstein (1986–1989)
- Fourth Hans Brunhart cabinet, governing body of Liechtenstein (1989–1993)

== See also ==
- Hans Brunhart
