= Second Hans Brunhart cabinet =

Governing body of Liechtenstein (1982–1986)

- Government of Liechtenstein

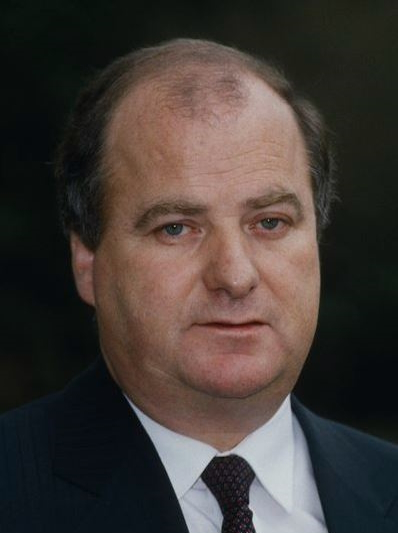
- Date formed: 7 April 1982
- Date dissolved: 2 May 1986

People and organisations
- Head of state: Franz Joseph II
- Head of government: Hans Brunhart
- Deputy head of government: Hilmar Ospelt
- Total no. of members: 5
- Member parties: FBP; VU
- Status in legislature: Coalition

History
- Election: 1982
- Predecessor: First Hans Brunhart cabinet
- Successor: Third Hans Brunhart cabinet

The Second Hans Brunhart cabinet was the governing body of Liechtenstein from 7 April 1982 to 2 May 1986. It was appointed by Franz Joseph II and chaired by Hans Brunhart.

== History ==
The 1982 Liechtenstein general election resulted in a win for the Patriotic Union. As a result, the First Hans Brunhart cabinet was succeeded with Hans Brunhart continuing as Prime Minister of Liechtenstein.

During the government's term, women received voting rights for the first time, following a referendum on the topic (among men only) in 1984.

The 1986 Liechtenstein general election resulted in a win for the Patriotic Union. As a result, the cabinet was dissolved and succeeded by the Third Hans Brunhart cabinet.

== Members ==
Picture	Name	Term	Role	Party
Prime Minister
	Hans Brunhart	7 April 1982 – 2 May 1986	Foreign affairs; Culture; Education; Finance; Construction	Patriotic Union
Deputy Prime Minister
	Hilmar Ospelt	7 April 1982 – 2 May 1986	Youth; Justice; Business; Traffic	Progressive Citizens' Party
Government councillors
	Egmond Frommelt	7 April 1982 – 2 May 1986	Social services	Patriotic Union
	Walter Oehry	7 April 1982 – 2 May 1986	Agriculture; Forestry	Patriotic Union
	Anton Gerner	7 April 1982 – 2 May 1986	Healthcare	Progressive Citizens' Party

== See also ==
- Politics of Liechtenstein
