= Kunsthaus case =

Political controversy in Liechtenstein

The Kunsthaus case, or the State Court affair, was a political controversy in Liechtenstein that lasted from 1985 to 1989 regarding alleged power abuse by the president of the Liechtenstein state court Erich Seeger when he overturned a previous ruling of the court in 1984. The controversy damaged the reputation of the state court and caused in tensions among party lines, resulting in early elections being called in 1988.

== Affair ==
In 1969, Franz Joseph II allowed for artworks owned by the House of Liechtenstein to be displayed in a new museum built in Liechtenstein. In 1975, Vaduz permitted land for the museum to be built on and it was approved via a local referendum in 1980. In 1983, a new popular initiative succeeded in obtaining enough signatures to make another referendum regarding the building of the museum. However, the initiative was rejected by the Vaduz municipal council, the government and finally the Liechtenstein state court.

On 22 May 1984, the people behind the initiative appealed for a reconsideration of the state court's ruling, which was approved on 15 October. However, on 9 November, the president of the state court Erich Seeger ordered a new investigation and on 15 February 1985 overturned the previous ruling and rejected the reconsideration. This damaged the reputation of the state court and resulted in several resignations by members. In April 1985 Seeger was charged by the public prosecution office for abuse of power in the state court. Despite it being found that an abuse of power had taken place, he was subsequently acquitted in May 1987.

In late 1988, the Progressive Citizens' Party sought to form a commission in the Landtag of Liechtenstein to investigate the power abuse further. However, it was rejected by the majority Patriotic Union (VU). The FBP threatened to propose a vote of no confidence against the government of Hans Brunhart, but withdrew at the request of President of the Landtag Karlheinz Ritter. The FBP's spokesman in the Landtag, Josef Biedermann, argued that the constitution granted the right to establish committees of inquiry to determine facts. On the other hand, the VU's spokesman in the Landtag, Hermann Hassler, argued that the establishment of a commission would weaken the independence of the judiciary; the VU later argued that the establishment of a commission would have been unconstitutional.

On 21 December 1988 all the members of the Landtag belonging to the FBP walked out in protest to the rejection of the commission. Talks between the two parties failed in January 1989 failed as neither party agreed to change position. Following the resignation of Brunhart's government, the Landtag was dissolved early elections were called for 5 March. Then-regent Hans-Adam II kept Brunhart's government in office with full authority during this time. In the subsequent 1989 general election the VU maintained its majority, and the new government was sworn in on 5 June with Brunhart continuing as prime minister. The people behind the popular initiative had formed the Non-Party List in 1987, which sought to challenge the political dominance of both parties. It contested the election, but failed to reach the electoral threshold of 8% to win seats in the Landtag.

The case led to a popular initiative by the FBP for a constitutional amendment to allow the Landtag to have greater oversight powers on the government. Similarly, a VU-led initiative sought to amend the constitution to allow for greater control over the judicial administration. Both proposals were accepted by voters on 3 December 1989.

== Bibliography ==
- Nohlen, Dieter; Stöver, Philip (2010). Elections in Europe: A data handbook. Nomos. ISBN 978-3-8329-5609-7.
