= Anton Gerner =

Liechtenstein chemist and politician (1941–2023)

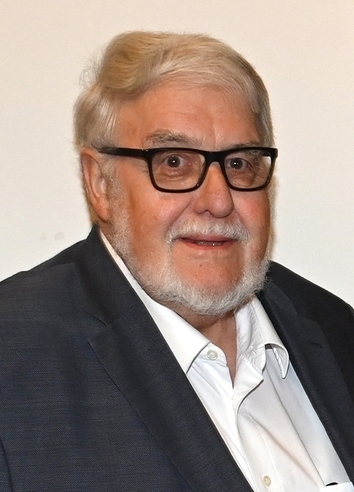
- Gerner in 2022

Government councillor for Healthcare
- In office 26 April 1978 – 30 April 1986
- Prime Minister: Hans Brunhart

Member of the Landtag of Liechtenstein for Unterland
- In office 1 February 1970 – 3 February 1978

Personal details
- Born: 24 March 1941 Eschen, Liechtenstein
- Died: 24 April 2023 (aged 82)
- Party: Progressive Citizens' Party
- Spouse: Irmgard Hasler (m. 1966)
- Children: 3

Anton "Toni" Gerner (24 March 1941 – 24 April 2023) was a politician and chemist from Liechtenstein who served as a government councillor from 1978 to 1986, with the role of healthcare. A member of the Progressive Citizens' Party (FBP), he previously served in the Landtag of Liechtenstein from 1970 to 1978.

== Career ==
Gerner was born on 24 March 1941 in Eschen to the son of future Landtag member Leo Gerner and Luzia (née Marxer) as one of three children. He attended secondary school in the municipality before conducting an apprenticeship at ThyssenKrupp Presta. Gerner studied chemistry in Winterthur before graduating in 1964 as an engineer.

From 1964 to 1986, he was head of the central laboratory of Hilti in Schaan, and also a lecturer at the evening technical college in Vaduz. He was the managing director of the Liechtenstein gas supply from 1986 to 2005.

=== Political career ===
Gerner served as the vice president of the youth department of the Progressive Citizens' Party (FBP) from 1963 to 1970. He was a member of the Landtag of Liechtenstein from 1970 to 1978 as a member of the FBP. During this time, he was temporarily the Landtag's secretary, and a member of the body's audit commission and state committee.

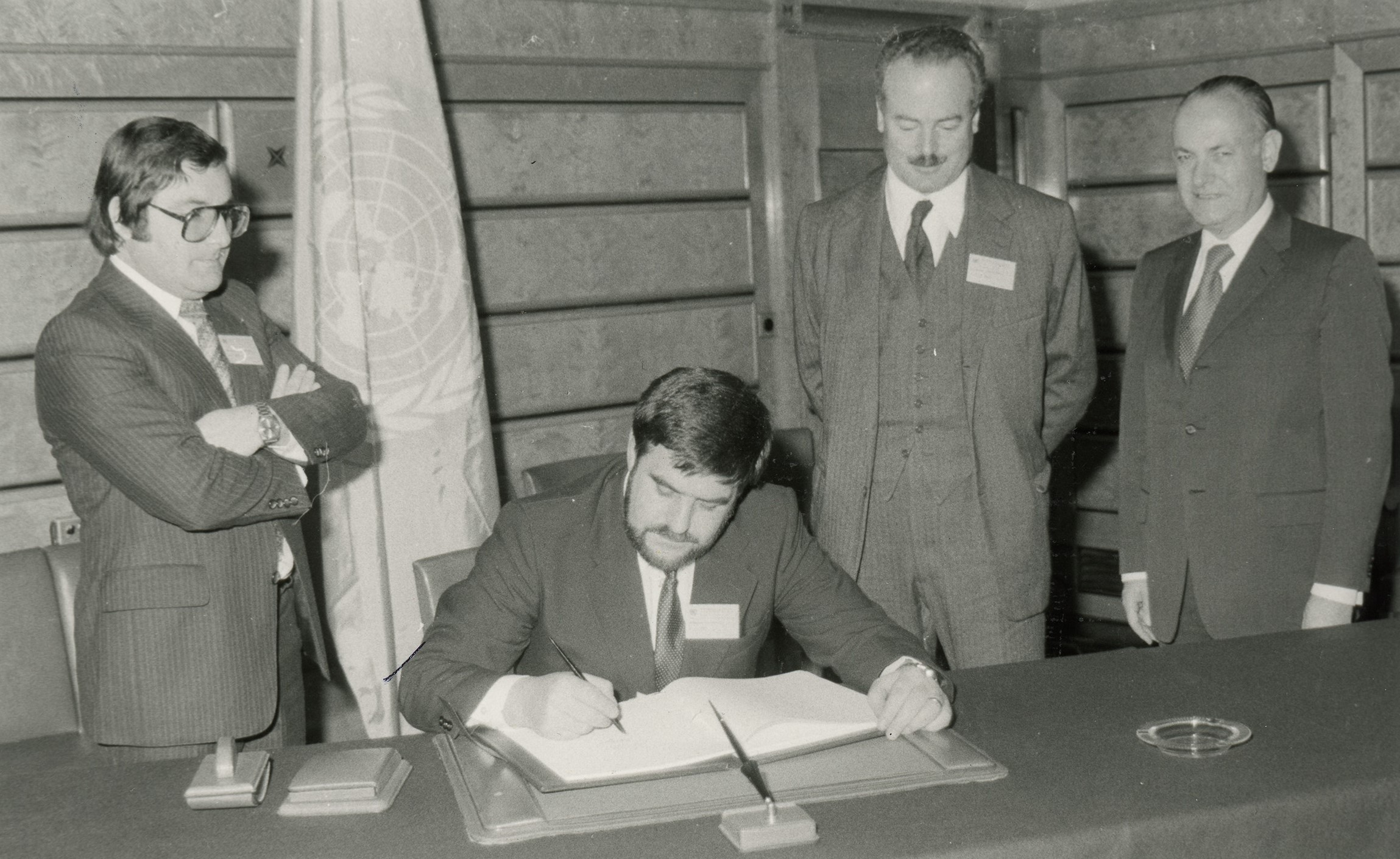
Gerner (sitting) signing the CLRTAP at the United Nations in Geneva, 1979

Following the 1978 elections, Gerner became a government councillor on 26 April 1978 under the government of Hans Brunhart as part of the coalition government between the FBP and Patriotic Union (VU). He held the role of healthcare. His time in office saw increased environmental protection, including the Clean Air act in 1985, and total revision of the Health Act the same year. He did not seek re-election in the 1986 elections.

== Personal life ==
Gerner was active in numerous bands in Liechtenstein, being the conductor of the Eschen Youth Band from 1974 to 1998. He was then a member of the board Liechtenstein Brass Band Association from 1988, and also its president from 2007 to 2013. In addition, he was a founding member of the Friends of the Liechtenstein Music School in 1997, and its first president until 2008.

Gerner married Irmgard Hasler on 1 October 1966 and they had three children together. He died on 24 April 2023, aged 82; his funeral service was held at the parish church in Eschen on 28 April.

== Honours ==
- Commander's Cross of the Order of Merit of the Principality of Liechtenstein (1986)

== Bibliography ==
- Vogt, Paul (1987). 125 Jahre Landtag (in German). Vaduz: Landtag of the Principality of Liechtenstein.
