= 1986 Liechtenstein general election =

- 31 January and 2 February 1986
- 15 seats in the Landtag; 8 seats needed for a majority
- Turnout: 93.32% (▼2.05pp)
| Party | Leader | Vote % | Seats | +/– |
|---|---|---|---|---|
| VU | Hans Brunhart | 50.19 | 8 | 0 |
| FBP | Herbert Wille | 42.75 | 7 | 0 |
This lists parties that won seats. See the complete results below.
Results by constituency
| Prime Minister before | Prime Minister after |
|---|---|
| Hans Brunhart; VU | Hans Brunhart; VU |

General elections were held in Liechtenstein on 31 January and 2 February 1986 to elect the 15 members of the Landtag. The Patriotic Union (VU) won a majority of eight seats, while the Progressive Citizens' Party (FBP) won seven. Voter turnout was 93.3%.

Incumbent prime minister, Hans Brunhart of the VU, sought re-election for a third term, while the FBP nominated Herbert Wille for the position. The elections saw a new political party, the Free List, contest the election for the first time, but it failed to reach the 8% electoral threshold to win seats in the Landtag. They were the first elections in which women were permitted to vote, as women's suffrage had been introduced in 1984; Emma Eigenmann-Schädler of the FBP was elected as the first female member of the Landtag.

== Background ==
In the 1982 elections the Patriotic Union (VU) won a majority of eight seats, while the Progressive Citizens' Party (FBP) won seven. As a result, the VU and FBP formed a coalition government, with Hans Brunhart continuing as prime minister.

The government's term in office saw the introduction of the Clean Air Act of 1985. In April 1984, the Landtag passed a constitutional amendment to introduce women's suffrage to Liechtenstein, at which point the government called a referendum via legislative referral. The referendum (among men only), which was supported by both the VU and FBP, was accepted by voters. Furthermore, in December 1985 a further referendum was held that asked voters if equal rights between men and women should be enshrined in the constitution. The referendum, which included both the original initiative and a counter-proposal from the VU, were rejected as neither proposal received a majority of votes.

== Electoral system ==
The 15 members of the Landtag were elected via open list proportional representation from two constituencies, Oberland with 9 seats and Unterland with 6 seats. Voters voted for a party list and then may have struck through candidates for whom they did not wish to cast a preferential vote, and may also have added names of candidates from other lists. The electoral threshold to win a seat was 8%. Landtag members sit for a four-year term. Once formed, the Landtag elected the prime minister and two government councillors who were then appointed by the reigning prince to govern in a cabinet. Voting was compulsory by law, and those who failed to vote without a valid reason may be fined, but it was not enforced. Citizens over 20 years of age who had been resident in the country for at least one month prior to election day were eligible to vote.

A referendum was held in July 1985 asking voters if the number of seats in the Landtag should be increased. The VU and FBP had differing proposals — the VU proposed increasing the number of seats in the Landtag to 21 and limiting the number of deputy members to ten, whereas the FBP proposed increasing the number of seats to 25 and limiting deputy members to one-third of the full members. However, both proposals were rejected as neither received a majority of votes.

== Campaign ==
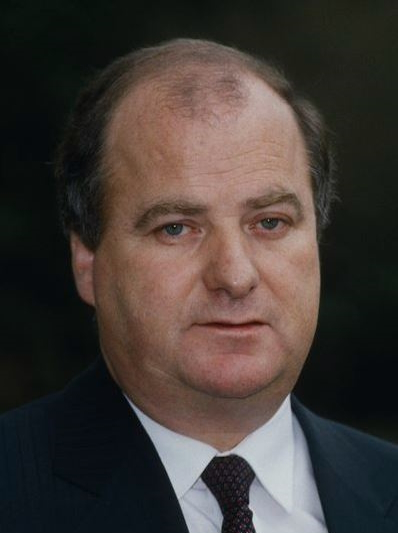
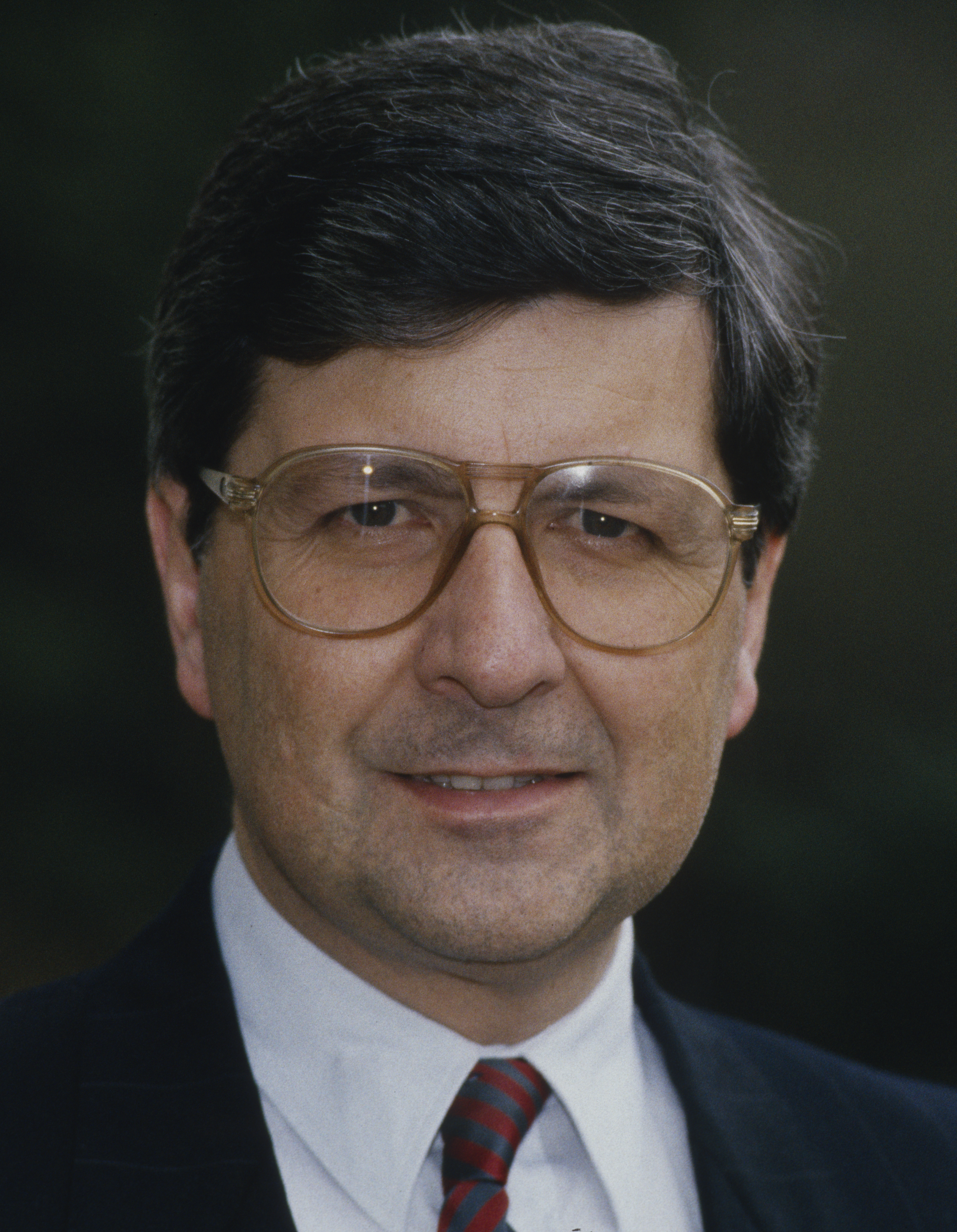
Hans Brunhart (left) and Herbert Wille (right) were the VU and FBP's respective nominations for prime minister

The VU renominated Brunhart for prime minister on 23 September 1986; the party sought to maintain the course of Brunhart's government. For the first time, the candidates for government councillors by the party was contested — the internal candidates were René Ritter, Peter Wolff, Heinz Büchel, and Gerald Schädler. Ultimately, Ritter and Wolff were selected as government candidates. The VU criticized the FBP for supposedly not taking a clear position on the initiative for enshrining equal rights between men and women in the constitution. In addition, the VU also accused the FBP of conducting a campaign of rumours, allegations, and personal attacks against the VU. During the campaign, the VU highlighted its achievements in social legislation, including the introduction of widowers' assistance, housing assistance, and revisions to the old-age and survivors insurance. The party's programme included policies such as environmental protection, increasing the number of seats in the Landtag, supporting families, expanding education, and community growth and participation.

The FBP nominated Herbert Wille for prime minister on 10 November 1985; the party presented itself as an alternative to the VU. Wille accused the VU majority of weakening the Landtag's authority and asserted that legislation had became too complicated. Furthermore, the FBP criticized the VU's record in government, accused the party of failing to achieve its promises, and that of being undemocratic. During the campaign, the FBP advocated for increasing the number of seats in the Landtag, abolishing the deputy member position, and lowering the electoral threshold to allow third party representation in the Landtag. The party's programme also included policies such as increased women's participation in politics, legal and citizenship equality between men and women, environmental protection, support for smaller businesses via taxation incentives, securing employment via vocational education, and family-centered care.

The Free List was founded in autumn 1985 under the initiative of the editors of the non-partisan newspaper Maulwurf as part of the wider emergence of green politics in Europe. The party announced Landtag candidates in December 1985; it stated that it did not consider itself a traditional party, but rather a collection of individuals with like-minded ideas. It advocated for policies such as environmental protection, equal rights between men and women, and government accountability in the Landtag.

== Candidates ==
Candidates had the same eligibility criteria as voters. Political parties in Liechtenstein required the support of 30 voters from a constituency to be eligible to nominate a candidate list in it. A total of 43 candidates contested the election; 32 men and 11 women.

| Oberland | FBP | VU | FL |
|---|---|---|---|
| Oberland | Herbert Batliner; Josef Biedermann; Rony Frick; Rösle Eberle-Kind; Heidi Wanger-Ritter; Louis Gassner; Dieter Walch; Johann Kindle; Gerhard Risch | Karlheinz Ritter; Alfons Schädler; Emma Brogle-Sele; Paul Kindle; Helmuth Matt; Reinhard Walser; Georg Vogt; Hildegard Beck; Hanspeter Foser | Gerda Bicker-Brunhart; Peter Frommelt; Hansjörg Hilti; Hilmar Hoch; Helmuth Marxer; Regina Marxer; Barbara Rheinberger; Kurt Wachter |
| Unterland | FBP | VU | FL |
| Unterland | Josef Büchel; Emma Eigenmann-Schädler; Felix Hassler; Heinz Ritter; Roland Elkuch; Franz Marxer | Hermann Hassler; Günther Wohlwend; Magda Batliner-Meier; Karl-Heinz Oehri; Beat Hasler; Edwin Marxer | Bernd Erne; Annelies Heeb-Breuss; Toni Ritter |
Source: Liechtensteiner Volksblatt

== Results ==
The seat distribution in the Landtag was unchanged from 1982 elections. The VU received 50.2% of the vote, a 3.3% decrease from 1982, and retained its majority of eight seats. The FBP received 42.8%, a 3.7% decrease from 1982 and won seven seats. The Free List received 7.1%, but failed to reach the electoral threshold of 8% to win seats in the Landtag.

A total of 11,676 ballots were cast, resulting in a 93.3% voter turnout.

| Party | Votes | % | Seats | +/– |
|---|---|---|---|---|
| Patriotic Union | 46,793 | 50.19 | 8 | 0 |
| Progressive Citizens' Party | 39,853 | 42.75 | 7 | 0 |
| Free List | 6,582 | 7.06 | 0 | New |
| Total | 93,228 | 100.00 | 15 | 0 |
| Valid votes | 11,612 | 99.45 | | |
| Invalid/blank votes | 64 | 0.55 | | |
| Total votes | 11,676 | 100.00 | | |
| Registered voters/turnout | 12,512 | 93.32 | | |
Source: Nohlen & Stöver

=== By electoral district ===
| Electoral district | Seats | Party | Elected members | Substitutes | Votes | % | Seats | +/– |
|---|---|---|---|---|---|---|---|---|
| Oberland | 9 | Patriotic Union | Paul Kindle; Helmuth Matt; Alfons Schädler; Georg Vogt; Karlheinz Ritter | Wasler Reinhard; Foser Hanspeter; Emma Brogle-Sele; Hildegard Beck | 36,235 | 51.31 | 5 | 0 |
| Oberland | 9 | Progressive Citizens' Party | Josef Biedermann; Johann Kindle; Dieter Walch; Louis Gassner | Rony Frick; Rösle Eberle-Kind | 29,001 | 41.06 | 4 | 0 |
| Unterland | 6 | Progressive Citizens' Party | Emma Eigenmann-Schädler; Josef Büchel; Heinz Ritter | Roland Elkuch; Felix Hasler; Franz Marxer | 10,816 | 47.94 | 3 | 0 |
| Unterland | 6 | Patriotic Union | Günther Wohlwend; Beat Hasler; Hermann Hassler | Karlheinz Oehri; Edwin Marxer | 10,544 | 46.73 | 3 | 0 |
Source: Vogt

== Aftermath ==
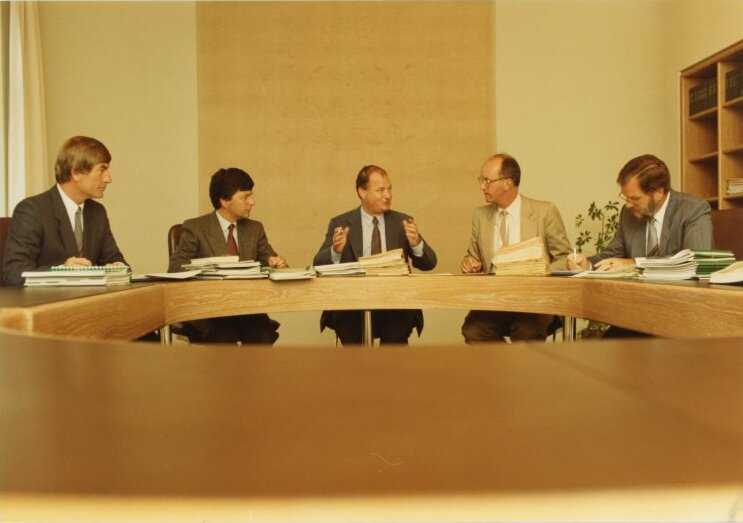
The government of Hans Brunhart

Following the elections, the VU invited the FBP to begin negotiations for a renewed coalition government, which the FBP accepted. The VU and FBP entered into a renewed coalition government, ultimately under the leadership of Brunhart. As the junior party in the coalition, Wille became deputy prime minister. The new government was sworn in on 2 May 1986. Karlheinz Ritter of the VU was re-elected as President of the Landtag upon the first session of the newly elected Landtag on 16 April 1986, with Josef Biedermann of the FBP as vice president.

FBP party president Herbert Batliner acknowledged the FBP's loss as a "significant defeat" and resigned from his position following the elections, as did the two vice presidents. Emma Eigenmann-Schädler of the FBP was elected as the first female member of the Landtag. The Free List, which received 7% of the vote, was considered a surprise result by observers — both the VU and FBP lost votes to the Free List.
