= Herbert Wille =

Deputy Prime Minister of Liechtenstein from 1986 to 1993

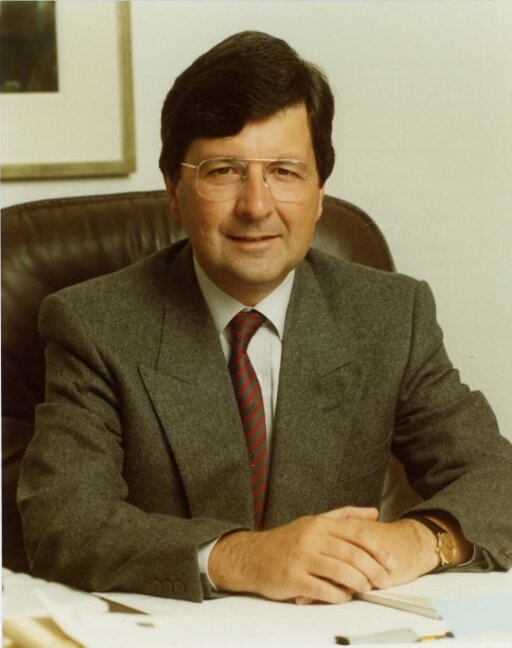
- Official portrait, 1986

Deputy Prime Minister of Liechtenstein
- In office 2 May 1986 – 26 May 1993
- Monarchs: Franz Joseph II; Hans-Adam II
- Prime Minister: Hans Brunhart
- Preceded by: Hilmar Ospelt
- Succeeded by: Mario Frick

Personal details
- Born: 16 January 1944 (age 82) Balzers, Liechtenstein
- Party: Progressive Citizens' Party
- Spouse: Magdalena Hugentobler (m. 1971)
- Children: 2

Herbert Wille (born 16 January 1944) is a lawyer and politician from Liechtenstein who served as the Deputy Prime Minister of Liechtenstein from 1986 to 1993, under the government of Hans Brunhart.

== Early life ==
Wille was born on 16 January 1944 in Balzers as the son of Anton Wille and Kreszenz Willi as one of five children. He attended high school in Vaduz before studying law in the University of Freiburg from 1964, where he graduated with a doctorate in 1972. From 1970 to 1986 he was a secretary for the Liechtenstein government.

== Deputy Prime Minister of Liechtenstein ==
He was the Progressive Citizens' Party's candidate for Prime Minister of Liechtenstein in the 1986 Liechtenstein general election. The election resulted in a win for the Patriotic Union. As a result, Wille was appointed Deputy Prime Minister of Liechtenstein on 2 May 1986, under the government of Hans Brunhart, succeeding Hilmar Ospelt. Additionally, he was a government councillor with the roles of interior, culture, youth, sport, agriculture, forestry, environment, and justice.

During his term in office, Liechtenstein became a full member of the United Nations in 1990 following Security Council Resolution 663. In addition, the 1992 Liechtenstein constitutional crisis took place, where Hans-Adam II threatened to dismiss the government and Landtag of Liechtenstein over disputes regarding the holding of a referendum regarding Liechtenstein's accession to the European Economic Area.

He was again the Progressive Citizens' Party candidate for prime minister in the 1989 Liechtenstein general election. He was succeeded as deputy prime minister by Mario Frick on 26 May 1993.

== Later life ==
In 1995, Wille submitted a complaint to the European Convention on Human Rights against the state of Liechtenstein for the violation of freedom of speech and right to an effective remedy. This was prompted by a letter from Hans-Adam II to Wille that stated that he would not appoint him to a public office due to Wille expressing the opinion in a speech that the Liechtenstein state court should hold a final say over the prince regarding disputes with the constitution of Liechtenstein. In 1999, the ECHR ruled that a violation had taken place and the state of Liechtenstein was convicted.

Since 1993, Wille has been a research officer at the Liechtenstein Institute. He was a lecturer at the University of Innsbruck from 1993 to 2003. In 2014, to mark his 70th birthday, he was the subject of a commemorative publication by the Liechtenstein Institute. In 2015, he wrote and published the book Die liechtensteinische Staatordnung (The Liechtenstein State System), regarding the political systems and constitution of Liechtenstein.

== Personal life ==
Wille married Magdalena Hugentobler on 21 May 1971 and they have two children together.
