= Egmond Frommelt =

Liechtenstein banker and politician (1927–2019)

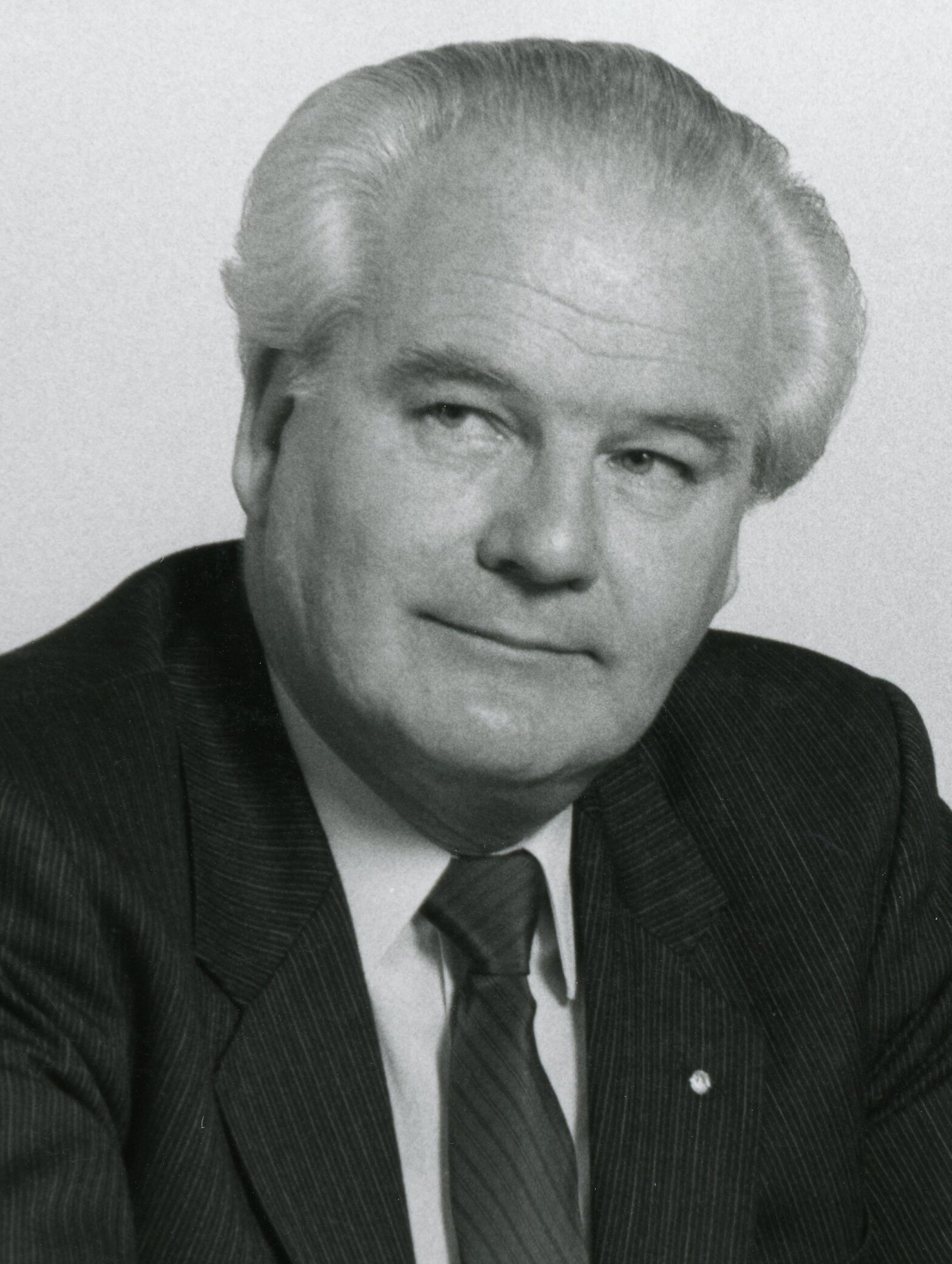
- Frommelt in 1985

Government councillor for Social Services
- In office 26 April 1978 – 30 April 1986
- Prime Minister: Hans Brunhart

Personal details
- Born: 1 June 1927 Weiler, Austria
- Died: 27 October 2019 (aged 92) Vaduz, Liechtenstein
- Party: Patriotic Union
- Spouse: Marianne Schädler (m. 1954; died 2016)
- Relations: Otto Schaedler (father-in-law)
- Children: 6

Egmond Frommelt (1 June 1927 – 27 October 2019) was a banker and politician from Liechtenstein who served as a government councillor from 1978 to 1986, with the role of social services.

== Life ==
Frommelt was born on 1 June 1927 in Weiler, Austria as the son of car manufacturer Otto Frommelt and Maria (née Mathis) as one of nine children. He attended school in Vaduz before conducting an apprenticeship as an electrical engineer. From there, he had his matura at the Institut Minerva in Zurich in 1950, and then studying economics at the University of St. Gallen and University of Innsbruck, graduating with a doctorate in economic sciences in 1956.

Initially working in stock exchange in Zurich and New York City, he worked at Bank in Liechtenstein (now LGT Group). He was a member of the bank's executive board from 1968 to 1989, and its chairman from 1983 to 1989. He was then a member of the bank's board of directors from 1989 to 1998, and its president from 1989 to 1993. He was the bank's first honorary president from 1993. Frommelt was the president of the board of trustees Liechtenstein Development Service from 1972 to 1976, and then president of Theaters am Kirchplatz (TaK) in Schaan from 1977 to 1979.

Following the 1978 elections, Frommelt became a government councillor on 26 April 1978 as a member of the Patriotic Union (VU), under the government of Hans Brunhart as part of the coalition government between the VU and Progressive Citizens' Party (FBP). He held the role of social services. His time in office oversaw revision of old-age and survivors insurance in Liechtenstein, the introduction of widow benefits in 1982, and revision of the Social Assistance Act in 1984. He did no seek re-election in the 1986 elections.

Frommelt was the president Liechtenstein Chamber of Industry and Commerce from 1988 to 1996, and he represented Liechtenstein at the European Bank for Reconstruction and Development from 1991 to 1998.

== Personal life ==
Frommelt married Marianne Schädler (29 June 1927 – 10 February 2016) on 15 June 1954, the daughter of VU party president Otto Schaedler; they had six children together. Originally from Ruggell, he was a citizen of Vaduz. Frommelt died on 27 October 2019, aged 92. His funeral service was held on 2 November.

== Honours ==
- Commander's Cross of the Order of Merit of the Principality of Liechtenstein (1987)
