= 2011 Liechtenstein local elections =

- 20 February 2011

The 2011 Liechtenstein local elections were held on 20 February to elect the municipal councils and the mayors of the eleven municipalities of Liechtenstein.

== Electoral system ==
The municipal councils (German: Gemeinderat) are composed of an even number of councilors plus the mayor (German: Gemeindevorsteher). The number of councilors is determined by population count: 6 or 8 councilors for population 1,500, 8 or 10 councilors for population between 1,500 and 3,000, and 10 or 12 councilors for population over 3,000.

Councilors were elected in single multi-member districts, consisting of the municipality's territory, using an open list proportional representation system. Voting was on the basis of universal suffrage in a secret ballot. The mayors were elected in a two-round system. If none of the candidates achieved a majority in the first round, a second round would have been held four weeks later, where the candidate with a plurality would be elected as mayor.

== Mayoral elections results ==
=== Summary ===
Party	Votes	%	Swing	Mayors	+/–
Patriotic Union	6,676	47.0	▼2.7	6	▲2
Progressive Citizens' Party	7,133	50.2	▼0.1	5	▼2
Free List	408	2.9	New	0	New
Invalid/blank votes	1,329	–	–	–	–
Total	15,551	100	–	11	0
Registered voters/turnout	18,804	82.7	▲3.1	–	–
Source: Gemeindewahlen, Statistisches Jahrbuch 2012

=== By municipality ===
Municipality	Electorate	Party	Candidate	Votes	%	Swing
Balzers	2,534	Patriotic Union	Arthur Brunhart	1,091	54.2	▲12.6
Balzers	2,534	Progressive Citizens' Party	Adolf Nigg	921	45.8	▼12.6
Eschen	2,137	Patriotic Union	Günther Kranz	1,045	59.9	New
Eschen	2,137	Progressive Citizens' Party	Daniel Oehry	700	40.1	▼32.5
Gamprin	855	Patriotic Union	Donath Oehri	518	71.6	▼4.2
Gamprin	855	Progressive Citizens' Party	Hubert Müssner	205	28.4	New
Mauren	1,893	Progressive Citizens' Party	Freddy Kaiser	1,030	71.6	▲4.0
Mauren	1,893	Free List	Andrea Matt	408	28.4	New
Planken	245	Patriotic Union	Rainer Beck	135	62.2	▲7.2
Ruggell	1,093	Progressive Citizens' Party	Ernst Büchel	618	67.1	▲15.2
Schaan	2,857	Patriotic Union	Daniel Hilti	1,648	76.2	▼10.4
Schaan	2,857	Progressive Citizens' Party	Willi Frommelt	515	23.8	New
Schellenberg	568	Progressive Citizens' Party	Norman Wohlwend	373	76.1	▼3.3
Triesen	2,428	Progressive Citizens' Party	Günter Mahl	863	51.9	▲12.5
Triesen	2,428	Patriotic Union	Max Gross	801	48.1	▼12.5
Triesenberg	1,645	Patriotic Union	Hubert Sele	866	64.2	▼12.3
Triesenberg	1,645	Progressive Citizens' Party	Rainer Schädler	484	35.8	New
Vaduz	2,549	Progressive Citizens' Party	Ewald Ospelt	1,052	60.7	▲2.3
Vaduz	2,549	Patriotic Union	Roland Moser	749	39.3	▼2.3
Source: Gemeindewahlen, Statistisches Jahrbuch 2012

== Municipal council elections results ==
=== Summary ===
Party	Votes	%	Swing	Seats	+/–
Progressive Citizens' Party	70,317	45.8	▼0.5	54	▲3
Patriotic Union	70,399	45.9	▲1.6	46	▼2
Free List	11,758	7.7	▼1.7	6	▼1
Independent	892	0.6	New	0	New
Total votes	153,366	100	–	106	0
Valid ballots	14,632	–	–	–	–
Invalid/blank ballots	919	–	–	–	–
Total	15,551	–	–	–	–
Registered voters/turnout	18,804	82.7	▲3.1	–	–
Source: Gemeindewahlen, Statistisches Jahrbuch 2012

=== By municipality ===
Municipality	Seats	Electorate	Party	Candidates	Votes	%	Swing	Seats	+/–
Balzers	12	2,534	Progressive Citizens' Party	Alexander Vogt; Marcel Kaufmann; Urs Vogt; Monika Frick; Thomas Büchel; Fidel Frick; Rainer Nipp; Christian Gstöhl; Peter Frick; Doris Gabathuler	9,976	41.5	▲1.0	6	▲2
Balzers	12	2,534	Patriotic Union	Mario Vogt; Patrick Büchel; Bruno Vogt; Günter Vogt; Roswitha Vogt; Thomas Wolfinger; Manfred Beck; Günter Frick; Doris Frick; Albrecht Wössner	11,655	48.5	▼0.8	5	▼2
Balzers	12	2,534	Free List	Christel Kaufmann; Lukas Laternser; Nadja Frick	2,417	10.1	▼1.7	0	0
Eschen	10	2,137	Patriotic Union	Siglinde Marxer; Mario Hundertpfund; Jochen Ott; Gina Hasler; Werner Biberschulte; Philipp Gstöhl; Helmuth Gstöhl; Andreas Müller; Toni Schächle; Karl Heinz Risch	9,485	55.5	▲9.0	5	0
Eschen	10	2,137	Progressive Citizens' Party	Werner Marxer; Albert Kindle; Manfred Meier; Viktor Marxer; Pia Rieley; Marina Hoop; Thomas Näf; Monika Mandel	6,703	39.2	▼5.3	5	▲1
Eschen	10	2,137	Independent	Stefanie von Grünigen-Sele	892	5.2	New	0	New
Gamprin	8	855	Patriotic Union	Wolfgang Oehri; Dietmar Hasler; Rudolf Oehri; Gilbert Kind; Nora Meier	2,974	51.3	▲7.1	3	▲1
Gamprin	8	855	Progressive Citizens' Party	Dagmar Gadow; Michael Walser; Judith Büchel; Otto Kind; Ingrid Hasler; Philipp Hasler; Magnus Hassler	2,826	48.7	▼7.1	5	▼1
Mauren	10	1,893	Progressive Citizens' Party	Harald Senti; Hanspeter Öhri; Irene Mündle; Reto Kieber; Robert Matt; Frank Heeb; Marianne Busa; Michael Marxer; Miriam Bless; Elisabeth Stöckli	8,490	57.4	▲1.3	6	0
Mauren	10	1,893	Patriotic Union	Patrik Schreiber; Claudia Kaiser; Stefan Sohler; Karlheinz Matt; Gerald Meier; Erwin Gassner; Nina Pfeiffer-Ritter	4,643	31.4	▲1.5	3	0
Mauren	10	1,893	Free List	Claudia Robinigg-Büchel; Myriam Bargetze; Kurt F. Monz	1,657	11.2	▼2.8	1	0
Planken	6	245	Progressive Citizens' Party	Josef Biedermann; Irene Elford; Monika Stahl; Günther Jehle; Daniel Schierscher	733	59.3	▲13.2	4	▲1
Planken	6	245	Patriotic Union	Horst Meier; Norbert Gantner; Claudio Lübbig	503	40.7	▲4.3	2	0
Ruggell	8	1,093	Progressive Citizens' Party	Norman Walch; Alois Hoop; Melanie Büchel; Esther Büchel; Siegfried Schwarz; Eliane Grandchamp	3,543	50.7	▼4.4	4	0
Ruggell	8	1,093	Patriotic Union	Judith Oehri; Martin Büchel; Mario Wohlwend; Peter Biedermann; Roland Hilti; Helmut Schwendinger	3,441	49.3	▲4.4	4	0
Schaan	12	2,857	Progressive Citizens' Party	Hubert Hilti; Nikolaus Frick; Markus Beck; Arnold Frick; Markus Falk; Sarah Ritter; Waltraud Frommelt; Margot Retuga; Lea Boss-Schierscher; Gerhard Hermann	10,673	41.0	▼0.9	6	0
Schaan	12	2,857	Patriotic Union	Walter Frick; Cristoph Wenaweser; Rudolf Wachter; Christoph Lingg; Karin Rüdisser-Quaderer; Peter Näff; Reinhold Zanghellini; Heribert Beck; Josef Hermann; Daniela Frick	12,221	46.9	▲0.2	5	0
Schaan	12	2,857	Free List	Manuela Haldner-Schierscher; Georg Kaufmann	3,158	12.1	▲0.7	1	0
Schellenberg	8	568	Progressive Citizens' Party	Robert Hassler; Andrea Kaiser-Kreuzer; Reinold Hasler; Jürgen Goop; Helmut Biedermann; Gilbert Wohlwend; Patricia Oehri-Wagner; Silvan Kieber	2,044	54.8	▼1.9	4	▼1
Schellenberg	8	568	Patriotic Union	Mario Wohlwend; Dietmar Lampert; Marianne Hasler; Rebecca Lampert; Johannes Clavadetscher; Karin Hassler	1,256	33.7	▼0.2	3	0
Schellenberg	8	568	Free List	Patrick Risch	428	11.5	▲1.8	1	▲1
Triesen	10	2,428	Patriotic Union	Eva Johann-Heidegger; Ernst Trefzer; Ferdinand Schurti; Jürgen Negele; Max Burgmeier; Stefan Schädler; Alex Büchel; Walter Bargetze; Conny Vogt-Kleeberger; Jens Amann	7,380	42.7	▼2.3	5	0
Triesen	10	2,428	Progressive Citizens' Party	Albert Kindle; Ralf Beck; Paul Kindle; Johann Kindle; Stefan Ritter; Rolando Ospelt; Martina Haas; Franz Erne; Delia Koch; Karl Müller	8,447	48.9	▲2.6	4	0
Triesen	10	2,428	Free List	Monika Derungs-Scherzer; Susanne Falk-Eberle; Tamer Uz	1,463	8.5	▼0.2	1	0
Triesenberg	10	1,645	Patriotic Union	Erich Sprenger; Benjamin Eberle; Johann Beck; Karla Hilbe; Angelika Stöckel; Harald Schädler; Andreas Schädler; Felix Beck	7,360	54.0	▲2.2	5	0
Triesenberg	10	1,645	Progressive Citizens' Party	Mario Bühler; Stefan Gassner; Jonny Sele; Felix Beck; Hanspeter Gassner; Anton Frommelt; Marco Hoch; Marlis Bargetze	5,398	39.6	▼3.0	5	0
Triesenberg	10	1,645	Free List	Ludwig Frommelt	872	6.4	▲0.7	0	0
Vaduz	12	2,549	Progressive Citizens' Party	Susanne Eberle-Strub; Daniel Ospelt; Toni Real; Adolf Seger; Cornelia Meier-Spoerri; Manfred Ospelt; Markus Verling; Manfred Bischof; Emil Röckle; Rigobert Wolf	11,484	50.5	▲1.8	6	▲1
Vaduz	12	2,549	Patriotic Union	Renate Feger; Frank Konrad; Patrik Vogt; Brigitte Schweiger-Hartmann; Hansjörg Vogt; Philip Schädler; Markus Hemmerle; Patrick Wille; Martin Gassner; Johann Ott; Wolfgang Strunk; Monika Hemmerle-Beck	9,481	41.7	▼0.4	5	▼1
Vaduz	12	2,549	Free List	René Hasler	1,763	7.8	▼1.5	1	0
