= Mathias Kindlinger =

Austrian murderer and suspected serial killer

- Press photo (1963)
- Born: 1892; Austria-Hungary
- Died: July 30, 1964 (aged 71–72); Stein Prison, Krems an der Donau, Austria
- Other name: "The Bluebeard of Schrems"
- Conviction: Murder x2
- Penalty: Life imprisonment (Final murder); 12 years (first murder)

Details
- Victims: 2–5
- Span of crimes: 1927–1961
- Country: Austria
- States: Lower Austria, Upper Austria
- Date apprehended: For the last time on April 29, 1961

Mathias Kindlinger (1892 – July 30, 1964), known as The Bluebeard of Schrems (German: Der Blaubart von Schrems), was an Austrian murderer and suspected serial killer who was convicted of killing his first and fifth wives in 1927 and 1961, respectively, but is alleged to have been responsible for the deaths of three other women as well. He was never charged in the other murders and was instead sentenced to life imprisonment for the final murder, dying behind bars in 1964.

== Early life and first murder ==
Mathias Kindlinger was born in 1892. Little is known about his early life, but as an adult, he served in the Austro-Hungarian Army during the First World War. After the war ended, he found a job as a postal clerk, and due to his diligence and efficiency, Kindlinger would later be promoted to manager at the post office in Weiler. A married man with two children, he was considered a decent citizen and respected by the locals.

On July 7, 1927, however, his first wife, Viktoria, was found shot to death in the family's apartment and suspicions immediately fell on Kindlinger. He was immediately charged, convicted and sentenced to 12 years imprisonment for her murder.

== Release and new crimes ==
Kindlinger did not serve the entirety of his sentence, as he was paroled in 1934. Soon after his release, he started a romantic relationship with Maria Wegschneider, a florist from Linz. They lived together for two years until July 10, 1936, when Kindlinger called the police to inform them that his girlfriend had committed suicide. Upon arrival, authorities found that Wegschneider had apparently choked herself to death by tying a rope to a door handle. Due to the strange circumstances around her death, they suspected that Kindlinger could be responsible, but he convinced them that he was innocent and her death was written off as a suicide.

Not long after, he found himself another girlfriend, a rich 40-year-old named Anna Fleischer. The pair often went to trips around the French Riviera and had savings in roulettes in Monte Carlo. On February 2, 1938, Fleischer's body was found hanging from a stove knob at her house in Aschach an der Donau. Due to the similarities with the previous death, Kindlinger was again suspected. Fleischer's relatives even had her body exhumed, but an official autopsy again wrote off her death as a suicide.

The final unconfirmed death occurred on August 5, 1953, when Kindlinger's second wife, Friederike Radler, died from a suspected brain tumor. Due to her death, her husband inherited a large sum of money, leading the authorities to believe that he might be involved with her death somehow. However, no evidence indicated that this was the case, and Radler's death was written off as natural causes.

=== Murder of Margarete Mautner ===
Using the inheritance from his deceased wives, Kindlinger frequently posted marriage proposals in lonely hearts ads, where he presented himself as a "retired civil servant in need of love". One such advertisement attracted the attention of Margarete Mautner, owner of the first enamelling factory in the Waldviertel region, who answered his proposal. The couple married in Schrems in 1955, and through his marriage with Mautner, Kindlinger became the factory's manager.

The marriage proved to be troubled, as Kindlinger continued to correspond with a variety of women from around the country, sending them love letters. At one point, it was also claimed that he had bragged about a molesting a teenage girl, but this was never conclusively proven. Tragedy struck on April 29, 1961, when Hans Verhunc, Mautner's brother, decided to visit the spouses at their home in Schrems, only to find both of them tied up their beds. Kindlinger appeared to be still alive, but his sister had evidently been strangled to death. In the subsequent police investigation, Kindlinger claimed that they had been robbed and in the process, the robbers had tied them to the bed, accidentally causing his wife to suffocate to death. This explanation proved inconsistent, as an analysis of the crime scene indicated that there had no apparent struggle and Margarete had been tied up willingly. Due to this, Kindlinger was arrested on charges of murder and remanded to the local prison to await trial.

== Trial, sentence and death ==
Kindlinger during his trial

On March 4, 1963, Kindlinger's murder trial began at the regional court in Krems an der Donau. Throughout the duration of the process, Kindlinger, using a dictation machine due to his advanced age, repeatedly claimed that he was innocent and his wife had died during a supposed robbery. This claim was supported by his defense attorney, Dr. Peter Stern, who pointed out that his client made no confession to the murder and that most of the prosecution's evidence is circumstantial at best.

On the other hand, prosecutors presented testimony from several medical professionals that concluded that the robbery scenario would be impossible, as they had examined Kindlinger and found no defensive wounds, indicating that he had been tied up by his own volition. This proved to be crucial to their case, as even Kindlinger's own defense attorney admitted that he could not give any other reasonable explanation in his client's defense. Due to this, coupled with hearsay regarding the deaths of Kindlinger's love interests and his supposed molestation of the teenage girl, he was found unanimously guilty by the jury. As a result, he was convicted of the murder and given a life term. Upon hearing the verdict, Kindlinger simply shrugged it off, and when asked if he accepted it, he replied that he would leave it to his defense attorney.

After his conviction, Kindlinger was transferred to the Stein Prison in Krems an der Donau. Not long after his conviction, he filed an appeal to have his sentence overturned, but it was rejected by the Supreme Court of Justice, which found upheld the decision of the lower courts. The following year, Kindlinger suffered a heart attack, for which he had to undergo medical treatment at a hospital in Krems an der Donau. While he survived, he suffered from another heart attack on July 30, 1964, which proved to be fatal this time.

== See also ==
- Bluebeard
