= 1982 Liechtenstein general election =

- 5 and 7 February 1982
- 15 seats in the Landtag; 8 seats needed for a majority
- Turnout: 95.37% (▼0.35pp)
| Party | Leader | Vote % | Seats | +/– |
|---|---|---|---|---|
| VU | Hans Brunhart | 53.47 | 8 | 0 |
| FBP | Hilmar Ospelt | 46.53 | 7 | 0 |
This lists parties that won seats. See the complete results below.
Results by constituency
| Prime Minister before | Prime Minister after |
|---|---|
| Hans Brunhart; VU | Hans Brunhart; VU |

General elections were held in Liechtenstein on 5 and 7 February 1982 to elect the 15 members of the Landtag. The Patriotic Union (VU) won a majority of eight seats, while the Progressive Citizens' Party (FBP) won seven. Voter turnout was 95.4%.

Incumbent prime minister, Hans Brunhart of the VU, sought re-election for a second term, while the FBP nominated deputy prime minister, Hilmar Ospelt, for the position. Following the election, the VU and FBP formed a renewed coalition government, with Brunhart remaining as prime minister. It was the final election were women were not allowed to vote, as women's suffrage was introduced to Liechtenstein in 1984.

== Background ==
In the 1978 elections the Patriotic Union (VU) won a majority of eight seats, while the Progressive Citizens' Party (FBP) won seven. As a result, the VU and FBP formed a coalition government, with Hans Brunhart becoming prime minister.

During the government's term, Liechtenstein joined the Council of Europe in 1978. It also saw the Landtag approve a fund to build a national art museum and conference centre with support from both the VU and FBP. However, a popular initiative was called against the funding, and in the subsequent referendum in September 1980 the art museum was narrowly approved by voters, whereas the conference centre was rejected. In 1980 deputy prime minister, Walter Kieber of the FBP, resigned and was succeeded by Hilmar Ospelt.

== Electoral system ==
The 15 members of the Landtag were elected via open list proportional representation from two constituencies, Oberland with 9 seats and Unterland with 6 seats. Voters voted for a party list and then may have struck through candidates for whom they did not wish to cast a preferential vote, and may also have added names of candidates from other lists. The electoral threshold to win a seat was 8%. Landtag members sit for a four-year term. Once formed, the Landtag elected the prime minister and two government councillors who were then appointed by the reigning prince to govern in a cabinet. Only men aged 20 and above that had been resident in the country for at least one month prior to election day were eligible to vote.

A FBP-initiated referendum was held in May 1981 that proposed to re-introduce the majority clause that had been abolished in 1973. Under this system, the party with the most votes would automatically win the most seats in the Landtag. However, the proposal was narrowly rejected by voters.

== Campaign ==
The VU's candidate for prime minister was the incumbent Brunhart. Additionally, the party nominated incumbent government councillors Egmond Frommelt and Walter Oehry as government candidates; the party sought to maintain its majority and advocated for political continuity. The VU accused the FBP of obstructionism during negotiations for a freedom of movement agreement with Switzerland, hypocrisy in its campaign, and damaging Liechtenstein's international reputation for electoral gain. The VU also highlighted its achievements in approving the art museum and addressing shortcomings in housing legislation. During the campaign, the VU advocated for tax reform provided fairness towards families and relief for businesses. The party's programme also included policies such as supporting education, a social market economy, and introducing women's suffrage to Liechtenstein.

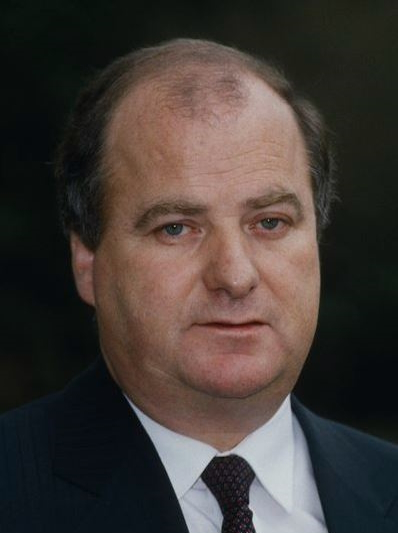
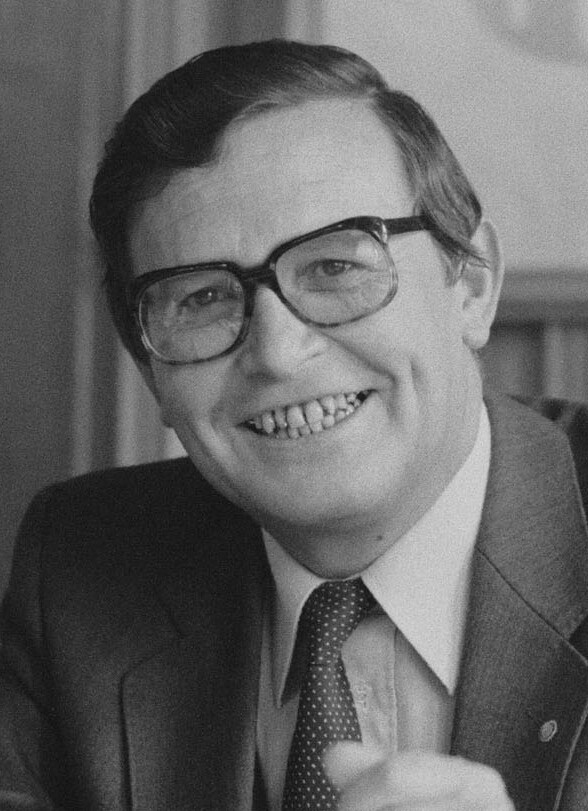
Hans Brunhart (left) and Hilmar Ospelt (right) were the VU and FBP's respective nominations for prime minister

The FBP nominated Hilmar Ospelt for prime minister on 15 December 1981; the party presented itself as an alternative to the VU. The FBP accused Brunhart of bypassing the Landtag in regards to public spending, and later criticized him for the freedom of movement agreement with Switzerland, claiming that it disadvantaged the domestic Liechtenstein workforce. The FBP also criticized the VU for failing to fulfil its promises, misleading voters during the campaign, and unjustly taking credit for achievements. During the campaign, the FBP advocated for promoting home ownership by stabilising mortgage interest rates and reducing the cost of buying land via tax exemptions. The party's programme also included policies such as preparing for economic developments, improving vocational education, and a child-centred education system.

During the campaign, an electoral complaint was filed against women not being permitted to vote, claiming it to be unconstitutional. Though the government rejected the complaint on the grounds of it being within the current law, it would have had no effect on the 1982 elections regardless.

== Candidates ==
Candidates have the same eligibility criteria as voters. Political parties in Liechtenstein required the support of 30 voters from a constituency to be eligible to nominate a candidate list in it. A total of 30 candidates contested the election.

| Oberland | FBP | VU |
|---|---|---|
| Oberland | Noldi Frommelt; Dieter Walch; Josef Biedermann; Eugen Büchel; Louis Gassner; Edwin Kindle; Peter Hemmerle; Richard Schierscher; Helmut Wohlwend | Karlheinz Ritter; Franz Beck; Georg Gstöhl; Alfons Schädler; Ludwig Seger; August Beck; Peter Wolff; Elias Nigg; Paul Kindle |
| Unterland | FBP | VU |
| Unterland | Armin Meier; Franz Elkuch; Beat Marxer; Felix Hassler; Josef Büchel; Walter Marxer | Hermann Hassler; Franz Meier; Anton Hoop; Franz Oehri; Günther Wohlwend; Karlheinz Oehri |
Source: Liechtensteiner Volksblatt

== Results ==
The seat distribution in the Landtag was unchanged from 1978 elections. The VU received 53.5% of the vote, a 4.3% increase from 1978, and retained its majority of eight seats. The FBP received 46.5%, a 4.4% decrease from 1978 and won seven seats.

A total of 5,003 ballots were cast, resulting in a 95.4% voter turnout.

| Party | Votes | % | Seats | +/– |
|---|---|---|---|---|
| Patriotic Union | 20,997 | 53.47 | 8 | 0 |
| Progressive Citizens' Party | 18,273 | 46.53 | 7 | 0 |
| Total | 39,270 | 100.00 | 15 | 0 |
| Valid votes | 4,909 | 98.12 | | |
| Invalid/blank votes | 94 | 1.88 | | |
| Total votes | 5,003 | 100.00 | | |
| Registered voters/turnout | 5,246 | 95.37 | | |
Source: Nohlen & Stöver

=== By electoral district ===
| Electoral district | Seats | Party | Elected members | Substitutes | Votes | % | Seats | +/– |
|---|---|---|---|---|---|---|---|---|
| Oberland | 9 | Patriotic Union | Paul Kindle; Georg Gstöhl; Alfons Schädler; Ludwig Seger; Karlheinz Ritter | August Beck; Franz Beck; Elias Nigg; Peter Wolff | 16,191 | 55.01 | 5 | 0 |
| Oberland | 9 | Progressive Citizens' Party | Josef Biedermann; Noldi Frommelt; Louis Gassner; Dieter Walch | Eugen Büchel; Edwin Kindle; Richard Schierscher; Peter Hemmerle | 13,239 | 44.98 | 4 | 0 |
| Unterland | 6 | Progressive Citizens' Party | Beat Marxer; Armin Meier; Josef Büchel | Walter Marxer; Felix Hassler; Franz Elkuch | 5,006 | 50.99 | 3 | 0 |
| Unterland | 6 | Patriotic Union | Franz Meier; Günther Wohlwend; Hermann Hassler | Anton Hoop; Karlheinz Oehri; Franz Oehri | 4,810 | 49.00 | 3 | 0 |
Source: Vogt

== Aftermath ==
Following the elections, the VU invited the FBP to begin negotiations for a renewed coalition government, which the FBP accepted. The VU and FBP entered into a renewed coalition government, though the members were unchanged from 1980; Brunhart remained as prime minister, and as the junior party in the coalition, Ospelt remained as deputy prime minister. The new government was sworn in on 7 April 1982. Karlheinz Ritter of the VU was re-elected as President of the Landtag upon the first session of the newly elected Landtag on 31 March 1982, with Armin Meier of the FBP as vice president.

The electoral complaint against women being disallowed to vote was rejected by the Liechtenstein state court in 1982. However, it was the final election were women was disallowed to vote, as in April 1984 the Landtag amended the constitution to introduce women's suffrage. In the subsequent referendum in July, supported by both the VU and FBP, the changes were accepted by voters.
