= Bernadette Brunhart =

Liechtenstein journalist and suffragist (born 1945)

- Born: Bernadette Biedermann; 5 August 1945 (age 80); Schaan, Liechtenstein
- Political party: Patriotic Union
- Spouse: Hans Brunhart (m. 1974)
- Children: 3
- Relatives: Arthur Brunhart (brother-in-law)

Bernadette Brunhart (née Biedermann; born 5 August 1945) is a journalist, politician and suffragist from Liechtenstein. She was a long-time advocate for women's suffrage in Liechtenstein, and co-founded the Committee for Women's Suffrage, the first political organization in the country to advocate for it.

== Life ==
Biedermann was born on 5 August 1945 in Schaan as the daughter of merchant Karl Gustav Biedermann and Sophie (née König) as one of eighteen children. She attended primary school in La Puente, California and then Pfäfers before attending elementary school in Schaan and then secondary school in Vaduz. From 1960 to 1963, she conducted a commercial apprenticeship at the Liechtenstein national administration, being the first woman to do so.

She was the secretary to prime minister Gerard Batliner from 1963 to 1970, and then for deputy prime minister Walter Kieber from 1970 to 1972. She was a co-founder of Liechtenstein's youth parliament, which existed from 1965 to 1969, and included the introduction of women's suffrage as one of its issues. In addition, she was one of the first female delegates to the Progressive Citizens' Party. In 1969, Biedermann, alongside Elfriede Winiger-Seger, founded the Committee for Women's Suffrage, which was the first political organization to advocate for the introduction of women's suffrage to Liechtenstein. However, the introduction was narrowly declined in a referendum in 1971, and the organization disbanded the following year.

During the premiership of her husband Hans Brunhart, she continued to advocate for women's suffrage, which was successfully introduced in following another referendum (among men only) in 1984. She is a contributor to the annual magazine Balzner Neujahrsblätter, and also its volunteer secretary from 1995 to 2015. She unsuccessfully ran for a seat in the Landtag of Liechtenstein in 2001 as a member of the Patriotic Union.

Brunhart co-founded the magazine 60plus in 2002, and was a member of its editorial board until 2014. In addition, she was president of the Liechtenstein senior citizens' union from 2005 to 2015. She is an advocate for the regogonition of elderly people in society, and was a member of the board of trustees at a retirement home in Balzers. Brunhart was the secretary of the Liechtenstein music school and at ECAG Euroconsult AG from 1994 to 2006. In 1987, she co-founded a pregnancy counseling center, the first of its kind in Liechtenstein. In addition, she headed the Balzer's family support service from 1997 to 2007, and has been an honorary member since 2010.

== Personal life ==
She married Hans Brunhart, the then-deputy prime minister and later prime minister; they have three children together. Her brother-in-law Arthur Brunhart, served as the President of the Landtag of Liechtenstein from 2009 to 2013. She grew up in Schaan but has lived in Balzers since 1972.
