= First Hans Brunhart cabinet =

Governing body of Liechtenstein (1978–1982)

- Government of Liechtenstein

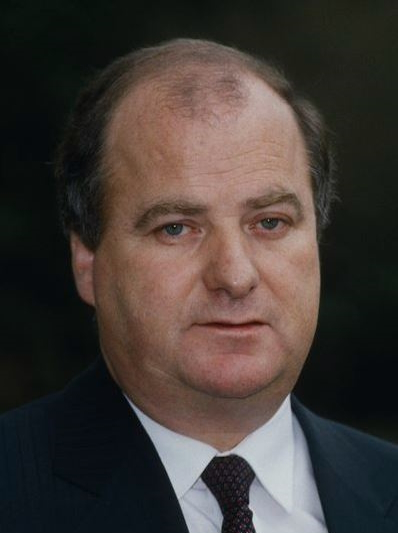
- Date formed: 26 April 1978
- Date dissolved: 7 April 1982

People and organisations
- Head of state: Franz Joseph II
- Head of government: Hans Brunhart
- Deputy head of government: Walter Kieber; Hilmar Ospelt
- Total no. of members: 6
- Member parties: FBP; VU
- Status in legislature: Coalition

History
- Election: 1978
- Predecessor: Walter Kieber cabinet
- Successor: Second Hans Brunhart cabinet

The First Hans Brunhart cabinet was the governing body of Liechtenstein from 26 April 1978 to 7 April 1982. It was appointed by Franz Joseph II and chaired by Hans Brunhart.

== History ==
The 1978 Liechtenstein general election resulted in a win for the Patriotic Union. As a result, the Walter Kieber cabinet was dissolved with Hans Brunhart succeeding Walter Kieber as Prime Minister of Liechtenstein.

During the government's term in office, Liechtenstein joined the Council of Europe in 1978.

The 1982 Liechtenstein general election resulted in a win for the Patriotic Union. As a result, the cabinet was dissolved and succeeded by the Second Hans Brunhart cabinet.

== Members ==
Picture	Name	Term	Role	Party
Prime Minister
	Hans Brunhart	26 April 1978 – 31 June 1982	Foreign affairs; Culture; Education; Finance; Construction	Patriotic Union
Deputy Prime Minister
	Walter Kieber	26 April 1978 – 31 June 1980	Exterior; Youth; Justice; Business; Traffic	Progressive Citizens' Party
	Hilmar Ospelt	1 July 1980 – 7 April 1982	Youth; Justice; Business; Traffic	Progressive Citizens' Party
Government councillors
	Egmond Frommelt	26 April 1978 – 31 June 1982	Social services	Patriotic Union
	Walter Oehry	26 April 1978 – 31 June 1982	Agriculture; Forestry	Patriotic Union
	Anton Gerner	26 April 1978 – 31 June 1982	Healthcare	Progressive Citizens' Party

== See also ==
- Politics of Liechtenstein
