= Kunsthaus =

Kunsthaus (German meaning "art house") may refer to:

- Kunsthaus case, 1980s political scandal in Liechtenstein
- Kunsthaus Graz
- Kunsthaus Tacheles
- KunstHausWien
- Kunsthaus Zürich

== See also ==
- Art gallery
- Kunsthalle
