= Gassner =

Gassner is a surname. Notable people with the surname include:

- Alexander Gassner (born 1989), German skeleton racer
- Dennis Gassner (born 1948), Canadian production designer
- Hermann Gassner (born 1988), German rally driver
- Louis Gassner (born 1945), Liechtenstein politician
- Peter Gassner (born 1965), American billionaire businessman
- Roman Gassner (1929–2008), Liechtenstein politician
- Sebastian Gassner (born 1987), Liechtenstein politician
