= Patrick Hilty =

Liechtenstein accountant and politician (born 1954)

Member of the Landtag of Liechtenstein for Oberland
- In office 5 March 1989 – 7 February 1993

Personal details
- Born: 13 September 1954 (age 71) Vaduz, Liechtenstein
- Party: Patriotic Union
- Spouse: Heidi Blätter (m. 1980)
- Children: 2

Patrick Hilty (born 13 September 1954) is an accountant and former politician from Liechtenstein who served in the Landtag of Liechtenstein from 1989 to 1993.

He works as a self-employed auditor and trustee. He was the president of the Liechtenstein association of auditors from 1992 to 2001. He was the CEO of the Switzerland and Liechtenstein branch of Grant Thornton until 2019.
