= Georg Schierscher =

Liechtenstein mathematician and politician (born 1942)

Member of the Landtag of Liechtenstein for Oberland
- In office 5 March 1989 – 7 February 1993

Personal details
- Born: 27 January 1942 (age 83) Schaan, Liechtenstein
- Party: Progressive Citizens' Party
- Spouse: Herlinde Marxer (m. 1970)
- Children: 4, including Manuela

Georg Schierscher (born 27 January 1942) is a mathematician, teacher, and former politician from Liechtenstein who served in the Landtag of Liechtenstein from 1989 to 1993.

== Life ==
Schierscher was born on 27 January 1942 in Schaan as the son of his father by the same name and Aurelia (née Martinelli) as one of three children. He attended secondary school in Vaduz before studying mathematics in Freiburg im Breisgau, where he received a diploma in 1969. From 1970 to 2002 he taught mathematics, computer science and physics at the Liechtensteinisches Gymnasium.

He was a judge at the Liechtenstein state court from 1977 to 1985. He was a member of the Landtag of Liechtenstein from 1989 to 1993 as a member of the Progressive Citizens' Party. In the run-up to the 2003 Liechtenstein constitutional referendum, Schierscher alongside other former members of the Landtag, opposed the proposed changes by the prince.

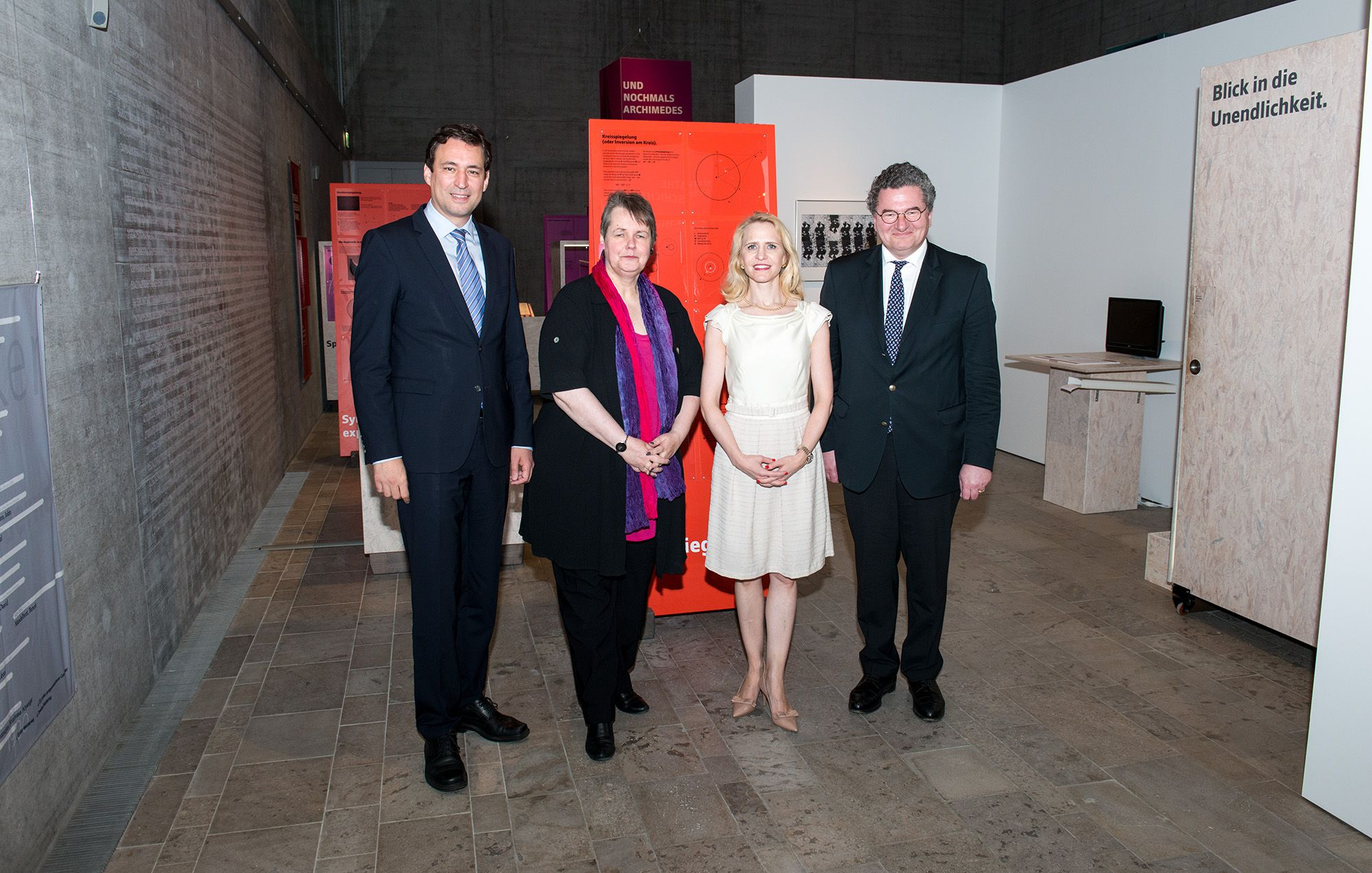
Schierscher's exhibition was presented in Munich in 2016, with Georg Eisenreich (left) and Aurelia Frick (centre-right) in attendance

Schierscher has published numerous works on mathematics and computer science. He initiated a mathematics exhibition which has been shown in Graz, Dortmund, Zagreb, Kreuzlingen and the Liechtenstein National Museum. In 2016 the exhibition was opened in the Staatliche Sammlung für Ägyptische Kunst by government councillor Aurelia Frick with the attendance of Georg Eisenreich. Since 2020, it has been loaned to the cultural property depot in Schaan.

Schierscher married Herlinde Marxer on 11 April 1970 and they have four children together. His daughter, Manuela Haldner-Schierscher, has served in the Landtag since 2021.
