= Third Hans Brunhart cabinet =

Governing body of Liechtenstein (1986–1989)

- Government of Liechtenstein

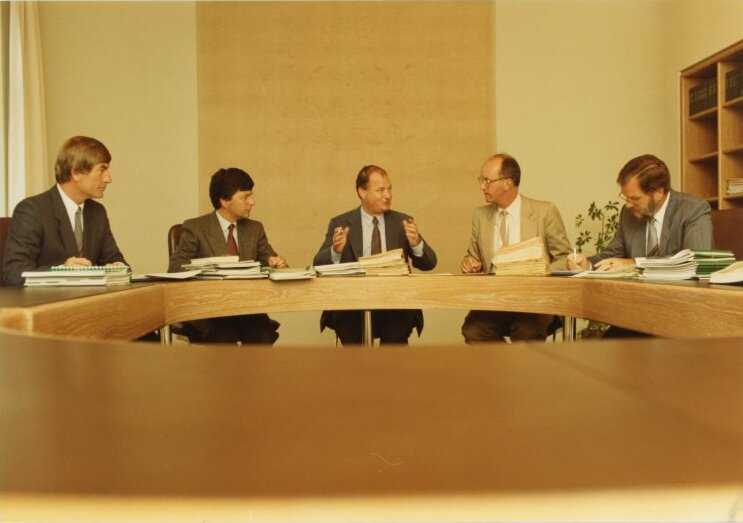
- Brunhart's cabinet in 1986
- Date formed: 2 May 1986
- Date dissolved: 5 June 1989

People and organisations
- Head of state: Franz Joseph II; Hans-Adam (regent)
- Head of government: Hans Brunhart
- Deputy head of government: Herbert Wille
- Total no. of members: 5
- Member parties: FBP; VU
- Status in legislature: Coalition

History
- Election: 1986
- Predecessor: Second Hans Brunhart cabinet
- Successor: Fourth Hans Brunhart cabinet

The Third Hans Brunhart cabinet was the governing body of Liechtenstein from 2 May 1986 to 5 June 1989. It was appointed by Hans-Adam on behalf of Franz Joseph II and chaired by Hans Brunhart.

== History ==
The 1986 Liechtenstein general election resulted in a win for the Patriotic Union. As a result, the Second Hans Brunhart cabinet was succeeded with Hans Brunhart continuing as Prime Minister of Liechtenstein.

During the government's term in office, Brunhart, along with Prince Nikolaus of Liechtenstein, held the presidency of the Committee of Ministers in 1987.

Starting from August 1988, the Progressive Citizens' Party called for the Landtag of Liechtenstein to investigate allegations of power abuse within the Liechtenstein state court by judge Erich Seeger in 1985. However, the Patriotic Union refused to support it, and in response the Progressive Citizens' Party's Landtag members resigned in protest on 21 December 1988 and early elections were called. The 1989 Liechtenstein general election resulted in a win for the Patriotic Union. As a result, the cabinet was dissolved and succeeded by the Fourth Hans Brunhart cabinet.

== Members ==
Picture	Name	Term	Role	Party
Prime Minister
	Hans Brunhart	2 May 1986 – 5 June 1989	Foreign affairs; Education; Finance; Construction	Patriotic Union
Deputy Prime Minister
	Herbert Wille	2 May 1986 – 5 June 1989	Interior; Culture; Youth; Sport; Agriculture; Forestry; Environment; Justice	Progressive Citizens' Party
Government councillors
	Peter Wolff	2 May 1986 – 5 June 1989	Social services	Patriotic Union
	Réne Ritter	2 May 1986 – 5 June 1989	Business	Patriotic Union
	Wilfried Büchel	2 May 1986 – 5 June 1989	Traffic	Progressive Citizens' Party

== See also ==
- Kunsthaus case
- Politics of Liechtenstein
