= Ida Ospelt-Amann =

Liechtensteiner poet (1899–1996)

- Born: Ida Amann; 15 February 1899; Vaduz, Liechtenstein
- Died: 12 March 1996 (aged 97); Vaduz, Liechtenstein
- Occupation: Poet
- Children: 6, including Hilmar and Werner
- Writing career
- Language: Alemannic
- Years active: 1947–1996
- Notable works: S'Loob-Bett'; S'ischt Suusersunntig
- Notable awards: Golden Cross of Merit

Ida Ospelt-Amann (15 February 1899 – 12 March 1996) was a Liechtensteiner poet who wrote in the Alemannic dialect that is spoken in the Vaduz region. She was considered the most important of her country's dialect poets. Her works deal primarily with rural life, as well as with her home town of Vaduz, and its change over time.

== Biography ==
Ida Amann was born in February 1899 to Franz Amann and his wife Elisabeth (née Burtscher). From 1905 to 1911 she attended elementary school and from 1911 to 1913 secondary school. After having finished school, she went abroad, where she worked in the resorts of Arosa, Portorož and St. Moritz.

Ospelt-Amann wrote her entire corpus of poetry in the Vaduz dialect. Over the years, she gained a certain amount of public notoriety. From 1960 to 1970 she was President of the Vaduz Women's Association. In 1965 she published her first volume of poetry, S'Loob-Bett, which was illustrated by Eugen Verling. This was followed in 1975 by a second book, S'ischt Suusersunntig. She also held readings and appeared on the radio. In 1984, to celebrate her 85th birthday, the book Di aaltaräder was published. In 1991 she issued a cassette tape, featuring texts and poems recorded in the Vaduz dialect. One example of her work is the poem, D Alpfaart, described successful mountaineering. Much of the tone of her writing is nostalgic. In addition to her poetry, Ospelt-Amann also collected proverbs and sayings from her dialect for the Liechtenstein National Museum.

Ospelt-Amann died on 12 March 1996. She had a total of six children, two sons and four daughters, including the politicians Hilmar Ospelt (de) and Werner Ospelt. Her grandsons include the artist Mathias Ospelt, and the poet Markus Meier.

== Recognition ==
For her services to preserving the Vaduz dialect, she received the Golden Cross of Merit and honorary citizenship from Vaduz.

== Legacy ==
According to the Liechtenstein State Library, Ospelt-Amann was a pioneer for the revival of dialect poetry in Liechtenstein. She was an Honorary Member of the Liechtenstein Dialect Foundation.

== Publications ==
- 1965 S’Loob-Bett
- 1975 S’ischt Suusersunntig
- 1984 Di aalta Räder
- (edited collection) Dittmar, Jens, ed. Lyrik aus Liechtenstein: von Heinrich von Frauenberg bis heute. Liechtenstein, 2005.
