= Fourth Hans Brunhart cabinet =

Governing body of Liechtenstein (1989–1993)

- Government of Liechtenstein

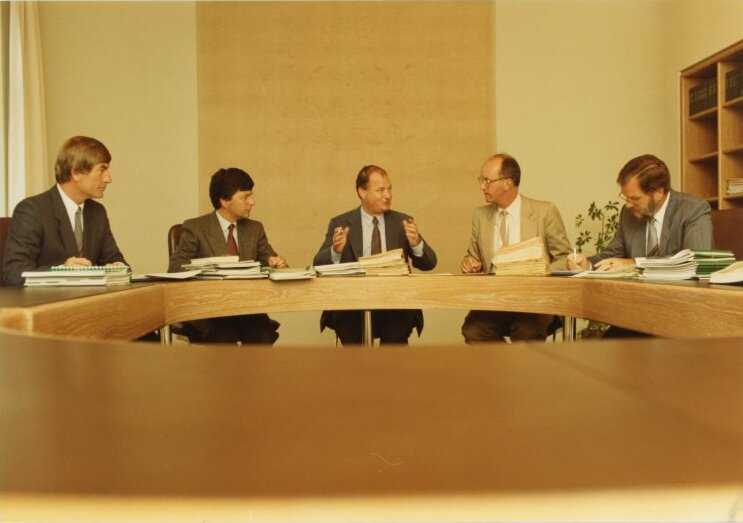
- Bruhart's cabinet in 1986
- Date formed: 5 June 1989
- Date dissolved: 26 May 1993

People and organisations
- Head of state: Franz Joseph II; Hans-Adam II
- Head of government: Hans Brunhart
- Deputy head of government: Herbert Wille
- Total no. of members: 5
- Member parties: FBP; VU
- Status in legislature: Coalition

History
- Election: 1989
- Predecessor: Third Hans Brunhart cabinet
- Successor: Markus Büchel cabinet

The Fourth Hans Brunhart cabinet was the governing body of Liechtenstein from 5 June 1989 to 26 March 1993. It was appointed by Hans-Adam on behalf of Franz Joseph II and then continued upon Hans-Adam's succession later that year. It was chaired by Hans Brunhart.

== History ==
The 1989 Liechtenstein general election resulted in a win for the Patriotic Union. As a result, the Third Hans Brunhart cabinet was succeeded with Hans Brunhart continuing as Prime Minister of Liechtenstein.

During the government's term, Liechtenstein became a full member of the United Nations in 1990 following Security Council Resolution 663.

The government was subject to the 1992 Liechtenstein constitutional crisis; in which while planning on the date for the a Liechtenstein referendum regarding accession to the EEA, Hans-Adam II called for it to be held in advance of the corresponding one in Switzerland, against the wishes of the government and the Landtag of Liechtenstein. On 28 October 1992, he threatened to dismiss the Landtag and the government over the dispute and appoint an acting prime minister in his place.

In response approximately 2000 people demonstrated in front of the government house in Vaduz. The same day, the government and Hans-Adam II negotiated and came to an agreement that scheduled the referendum after the corresponding one in Switzerland, though notably it affirmed that Liechtenstein would commit to agreements with the EEA despite the result in Switzerland. Liechtenstein subsequently joined the EEA in May the same year.

The February 1993 Liechtenstein general election resulted in a win for the Progressive Citizens' Party. As a result, the cabinet was dissolved and Brunhart was succeeded by Markus Büchel in the Markus Büchel cabinet.

== Members ==
Picture	Name	Term	Role	Party
Prime Minister
	Hans Brunhart	5 June 1989 – 26 March 1993	Foreign affairs; Education; Finance; Construction	Patriotic Union
Deputy Prime Minister
	Herbert Wille	5 June 1989 – 26 March 1993	Interior; Culture; Youth; Sport; Agriculture; Forestry; Environment; Justice	Progressive Citizens' Party
Government councillors
	Peter Wolff	5 June 1989 – 26 March 1993	Social services	Patriotic Union
	Réne Ritter	5 June 1989 – 26 March 1993	Business	Patriotic Union
	Wilfried Büchel	5 June 1989 – 26 March 1993	Traffic	Progressive Citizens' Party

== See also ==
- Politics of Liechtenstein
