= Beat Hasler =

Liechtenstein journalist and politician (1938–2017)

Member of the Landtag of Liechtenstein for Unterland
- In office 2 February 1986 – 5 March 1989

Personal details
- Born: 19 March 1938 Vaduz, Liechtenstein
- Died: 18 August 2017 (aged 79) Grabs, Switzerland
- Party: Patriotic Union
- Spouse: Edith Marxer (m. 1960)
- Children: 4

Beat Hasler (19 March 1938 – 18 August 2017) was a journalist and politician from Liechtenstein who served in the Landtag of Liechtenstein from 1986 to 1989.

== Life ==
Hasler was born on 19 March 1938 in Vaduz as the son of postmaster Martin Hasler and Ida (née Oehri) as one of five children. He attended secondary school in Appenzell before attending agricultural college in Flums and Rheineck from 1955 to 1957. He worked as a farmer and a freelance contributor to the Liechtensteiner Vaterland.

He was a deputy government councillor from 1974 to 1978. He was a member of the Landtag of Liechtenstein from 1986 to 1989. During this time, he was a member of the audit and state committees. He was a board member of the old-age and survivors insurance in Liechtenstein from 1965 to 1973.

Hasler married Edith Marxer on 23 July 1960 and they had four children together. He was from Ruggell. He died of heart failure on 18 August 2017, aged 79.

== Bibliography ==
- Vogt, Paul (1987). 125 Jahre Landtag (in German). Vaduz: Landtag of the Principality of Liechtenstein.
