= Martin Jehle =

Liechtenstein carpenter and politician (1943–2016)

Member of the Landtag of Liechtenstein for Oberland
- In office 5 March 1989 – 7 February 1993

Personal details
- Born: 21 October 1943 Schaan, Liechtenstein
- Died: 16 February 2016 (aged 72) Grabs, Switzerland
- Party: Progressive Citizens' Party
- Spouse: Brigitte Frick (m. 1966)
- Children: 2

Martin Jehle (21 October 1943 – 16 February 2016) was a carpenter and politician from Liechtenstein who served in the Landtag of Liechtenstein from 1989 to 1993.

== Life ==
Jehle was born on 21 October 1943 as the son of saddler and upholsterer of the same name and Hermine (née Frick). He conducted a carpentry apprenticeship in Schaan before studying at the technical college in Vaduz and then the school of timber construction in Biel/Bienne, graduating as a master carpenter in 1973; he founded a roofing business in 1969 based in Schaan. He was the head of the Liechtenstein mountain rescue in 1964 and again from 1966 to 1970, and also vice president of the Liechtenstein Alpine Club from 1977 to 1984.

He was a member of the Schaan municipal council from 1983 to 1995 as a member of the Progressive Citizens' Party (FBP), and also deputy mayor of the municipality from 1987 to 1995. He was elected as a member of the Landtag of Liechtenstein in 1989, and was considered an advocate for a free-market economic policy; he did not seek re-election in the February 1993 elections. He was the vice president of the FBP from 1995 to 2000.

Jehle married Brigitte Frick on 26 November 1966 and they had two children together. He died on 16 February 2016, aged 72.
