= Arthur Brunhart =

President of the Landtag of Liechtenstein from 2009 to 2013

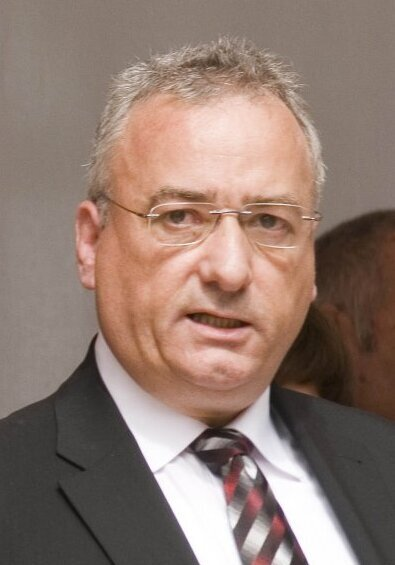
- Brunhart in 2011

President of the Landtag of Liechtenstein
- In office February 2009 – March 2013
- Monarchs: Hans-Adam II; Alois (regent)
- Vice President: Renate Wohlwend
- Preceded by: Klaus Wanger
- Succeeded by: Albert Frick

Member of the Landtag of Liechtenstein for Oberland
- In office 13 March 2005 – 3 February 2013

Personal details
- Born: 23 January 1952 (age 74) Balzers, Liechtenstein
- Party: Patriotic Union
- Spouse: Ulrike Banzer (m. 1988; died 2006)
- Domestic partner: Vera Thöny
- Relations: Hans Brunhart (brother); Bernadette Brunhart (sister-in-law)
- Children: 3
- Occupation: Historian

Arthur Brunhart (born 23 January 1952) is a historian and former politician from Liechtenstein who served as the President of the Landtag of Liechtenstein from 2009 to 2013 and as a member of the Landtag from 2005 to 2013. Additionally, he served as Mayor of Balzers from 2011 to 2015.

== Early life and career ==
Brunhart was born on 23 January 1952 in Balzers as the son of plasterer Andreas Brunhart and businesswoman Rosa Frick as one of eight children, including his brother Hans Brunhart. He attended secondary school in Mörschwil.

From 1973 to 1982 he studied history and ethnology in Freiburg im Breisgau and worked as a research assistant there from 1982 to 1984. He worked in various research positions in Rome, Paris, Dublin and London.

== Historian career ==
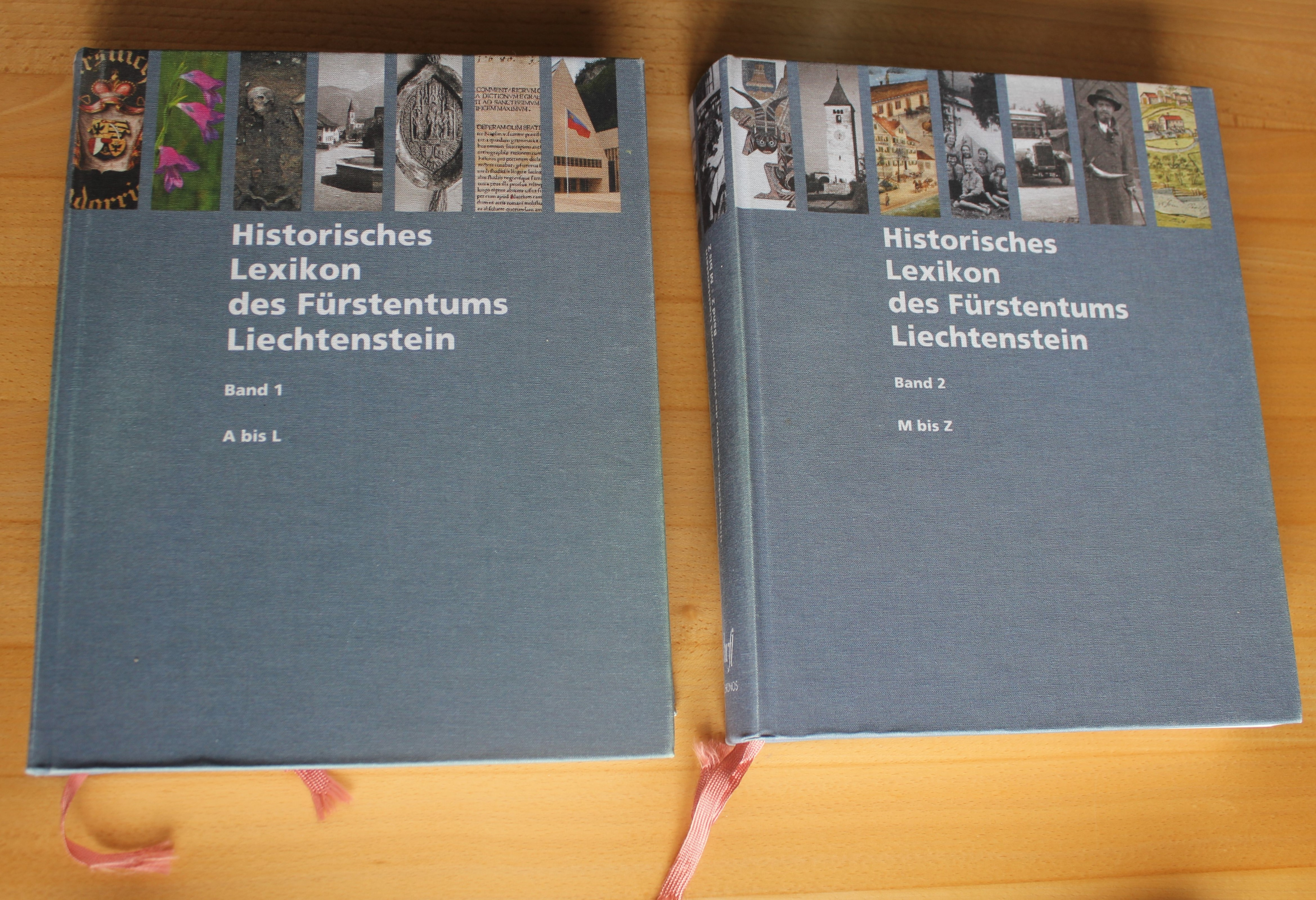
The two editions of the HLFL of which Brunhart contributed heavily to

From 1985 to 1990 he worked as a freelance historian. From 1990 to 2000 he was editor and chief, then project manager from 2001 to 2013 of the Historical Lexicon of the Principality of Liechtenstein, which was published in 2013. Supported by a scientific advisory board that met twice a year, Brunhart was the sole editor responsible for implementing the project from 1990 onwards. He initiated four Liechtenstein seminars ranging from 1994 to 1996 held at the universities of Zurich, Freiburg, Innsbruck and Salzburg respectively.

From 1985 to 1994 he was a member of the board of the Liechtenstein National Museum and then from 2000 to 2011 he was a research assistant and deputy director. He was also the vice-president of the Independent Commission of Historians Liechtenstein Second World War from 2001 to 2005 and board member of the Association for the History of Lake Constance and its Surroundings from 1995 to 2012. Since 2020, Brunhart has been the co-chairman of the Liechtenstein-Czech Commission of Historians. He is also a contributor to the Balzner Neujahrsblätter.

== Political career ==
Brunhart was elected to the Landtag of Liechtenstein in 2005 as a member of the Patriotic Union. He chaired the European Education Area from 2005 to 2009 and a member of the judge selection committee. He was the Mayor of Balzers from 2011 to 2015. He was the President of the Landtag of Liechtenstein from February 2009 to March 2013. He decided to not seek re-election to the Landtag in 2013 and was succeeded by Albert Frick.

== Personal life ==
Brunhart married librarian Ulrike Banzer (6 November 1959 – 14 March 2006) on 30 September 1988 and they had three children together. He has a domestic partnership with Vera Thöny, a businesswoman.
