= 1980 Liechtenstein referendum =

- 7 September 1980

Construction of a House of Arts
For	50.35%
Against	49.65%

Construction of a national conference centre
For	47.09%
Against	52.91%

A double referendum was held in Liechtenstein on 7 September 1980. Voters were asked whether they approved of the construction of a House of Arts and a national conference centre. The House of Arts was approved by 50.4% of voters, whilst the conference centre was rejected by 52.9% of voters.

== Results ==
=== Construction of a House of Art ===
Choice	Votes	%
For	1,864	50.4
Against	1,838	49.6
Invalid/blank votes	132	–
Total	3,834	100
Registered voters/turnout	5,067	75.7
Source: Nohlen & Stöver

=== Construction of a national conference centre ===
Choice	Votes	%
For	1,737	47.1
Against	1,952	52.9
Invalid/blank votes	145	–
Total	3,834	100
Registered voters/turnout	4,717	75.7
Source: Nohlen & Stöver
