= 1988 Liechtenstein referendums =

Increasing the number of Landtag members from 15 to 25
For	51.73%
Against	48.27%

Plan for company pensions
For	51.73%
Against	48.27%

Construction of the Gnalp–Steg tunnel
For	55.12%
Against	44.88%

Three referendums were held in Liechtenstein during 1988. The first two were held on 24 January and concerned increasing the number of members of the Landtag from 15 to 25 and a plan for compulsory company pensions. Both were approved by 51.7% of voters. The third referendum was held on 2 October on the construction of the Gnalp-Steg tunnel and was approved by 55.1% of voters.

== Results ==
=== Increasing the number of Landtag members from 15 to 25 ===
Choice	Votes	%
For	4,537	51.7
Against	4,234	48.3
Invalid/blank votes	211	–
Total	8,982	100
Registered voters/turnout	13,017	69.0
Source: Nohlen & Stöver

=== Company pension plan ===
Choice	Votes	%
For	4,496	51.7
Against	4,196	48.3
Invalid/blank votes	290	–
Total	8,982	100
Registered voters/turnout	13,017	69.0
Source: Nohlen & Stöver

=== Construction of the Gnalp-Steg tunnel ===
Choice	Votes	%
For	3,943	55.1
Against	3,211	44.9
Invalid/blank votes	188	–
Total	7,342	100
Registered voters/turnout	13,215	55.6
Source: Nohlen & Stöver
