= Balzner Neujahrsblätter =

Annual publication in Balzers, Liechtenstein

- Editor: Hans Brunhart
- Language: German
- Publication date: January 1995–present
- Publication place: Balzers, Liechtenstein
- Website: neujahrsblaetter.li

Balzner Neujahrsblätter (lit. 'Balzers New Years Letters') is an annual publication published in Balzers, Liechtenstein. It covers the history, culture, society and economy. As of 2011, it had a circulation of 2,500.

== History ==
The publication was initiated by former prime minister Hans Brunhart in January 1995. Other founding members included Georg Burgmeier, Elmar Bürzle, and Anton Gstöhl. The publication includes articles about the history, culture, society and economy of Balzers from various contributors. Notable contributors include Arthur Brunhart.

It is primarily funded through sponsorships, public funding and subscriptions. It also receives funding from the Balzers municipal government and the National Bank of Liechtenstein.
