= Referendums in Liechtenstein =

Referendums in Liechtenstein are held on the national and municipal level. The 1921 Constitution of Liechtenstein allows for referendums to be held on laws passed by the Landtag of Liechtenstein (parliament) via a legislative referral called by the Landtag or government itself, or via an optional referendum initiated by a popular initiative that has over a certain threshold of signatures from the electorate of the country. Initiatives can also be initiated by the municipal councils of Liechtenstein's eleven municipalities, although this is less common.

Popular initiatives can either be in the form of a suggestion to the Landtag, or a full legislative proposal to the body. The amount of signatures required by eligible voters is 1,000 for legislative issues, and 1,500 for matters concerning the constitution. If the initiative is initiated by the municipal councils, then it requires a successful resolution by three and four different councils respectively.

Mandatory referendums can also be held under more specific circumstances. For example, if the Landtag rejects a popular initiative a referendum must be held; the Landtag can offer a counter-proposal that voters may also vote for. In addition, laws that require a single or reoccurring state expenditure above a certain threshold are also automatically subject to referendum, and since 1992 treaties are also subject to a mandatory referendum.

Referendums can also be held on the municipal level on certain issues if at least one-sixth of voters in a municipality submit a request for an issue to be addressed by the municipal council.

== See also ==
- Elections in Liechtenstein
