= Herbert Batliner =

Herbert Batliner (born 26 December 1928 in Vaduz; died 8 June 2019) was a Liechtenstein lawyer and art collector.

== Life ==
A dual national, Herbert Batliner's mother was Austrian and his father, Eduard Batliner, was a Liechtensteiner director of the Liechtensteinische Landesbank (LLB) for 40 years. Batliner studied at the universities of Bern, Innsbruck, and Lyon. In 1952, he earned the degree of *Doctor iuris utriusque* (Doctor of Both Laws) and doctorate in economics (*Dr. rer. oec.*) from the University of Innsbruck. He was admitted to the bar in Liechtenstein in 1955.

From 1965 to 1970, he served as President of the Administrative Appeals Board, and from 1975 to 1980 as President of the State Court of Liechtenstein. From 1982 to 1986, he was Chairman of the Progressive Citizens' Party (FBP). From 1988 onwards, Batliner held the title of *Fürstlicher Kommerzienrat* (Princely Commercial Councillor). In 1990, the Austrian Federal President awarded him the professional title of Professor. Furthermore, he was named an honorary senator of the University of Innsbruck in 1969 and of the University of Salzburg in 1994.

Batliner operated the investment advisory firm Dr. Dr. Batliner & Partner in Vaduz until 2002. He is thought to have created family foundations that enabled millionaires to shield their assets from the tax authorities. The firm's clients included King Fahd bin Abdulaziz of Saudi Arabia, the Togolese dictator Gnassingbé Eyadéma, FIAT shareholder Giovanni Agnelli, Marc Rich, Rainer Gossmann (President of the German Ice Hockey Federation), Sigurd Pütter (owner of the Iserlohn-based pharmaceutical company Medice), the Bacardi family, and the Association of Mouth and Foot Painting Artists. Batliner's foundations were also used to conceal illegal political donations to the CDU.

== Art collector ==
In the 1960s, Herbert and Rita Batliner began collecting works of art. The collection, known as the Batliner collection, includes about 500 artworks. Since 2007, it has been on permanent loan to the Albertina in Vienna, where it is displayed as a permanent exhibition.

The collection includes French Impressionism, Post-Impressionism, and German Expressionism, as well as some East European avant-garde. However some of the artworks in the collection have fallen under suspicion of being forgeries.
