= 1985 Liechtenstein referendums =

New hunting law
For	37.46%
Against	62.54%

Increased number of Landtag members
For proposal I	39.0%
For proposal II	43.6%
Against both	17.4%

Sexual equality
For proposal I	23.3%
For proposal II	28.3%
Against both	48.4%

Three referendums were held in Liechtenstein during 1985. The first was held on 3 February on a new hunting law, and was rejected by 62.5% of voters. The second was held on 2 July on increasing the number of seats in the Landtag and had two proposals. Neither gained a majority of votes, so both were rejected. The third was held on 1 December on sexual equality. It also had two options, but both failed to gain a majority and were rejected.

== Results ==
=== New hunting law ===
Choice	Votes	%
For	3,010	37.5
Against	5,026	62.5
Invalid/blank votes	376	–
Total	8,412	100
Registered voters/turnout	12,272	68.5
Source: Nohlen & Stöver

=== Increased number of Landtag members ===
Choice	Votes	%
For proposal I	3,310	39.0
For proposal II	3,701	43.6
Against both	1,478	17.4
Invalid/blank votes	312	–
Total	8,801	100
Registered voters/turnout	12,317	71.5
Source: Nohlen & Stöver

=== Sexual equality ===
Choice	Votes	%
For proposal I	1,973	23.3
For proposal II	2,400	28.3
Against both	4,109	48.4
Invalid/blank votes	346	–
Total	8,828	100
Registered voters/turnout	12,445	70.9
Source: Nohlen & Stöver
