= Ministry of Healthcare =

Ministry of Healthcare may refer to:

- Ministry of Healthcare (Azerbaijan)
- Ministry of Healthcare (Kazakhstan)
- Ministry of Healthcare (Ukraine)
