= Weiler, Austria =

Weiler
- Municipality
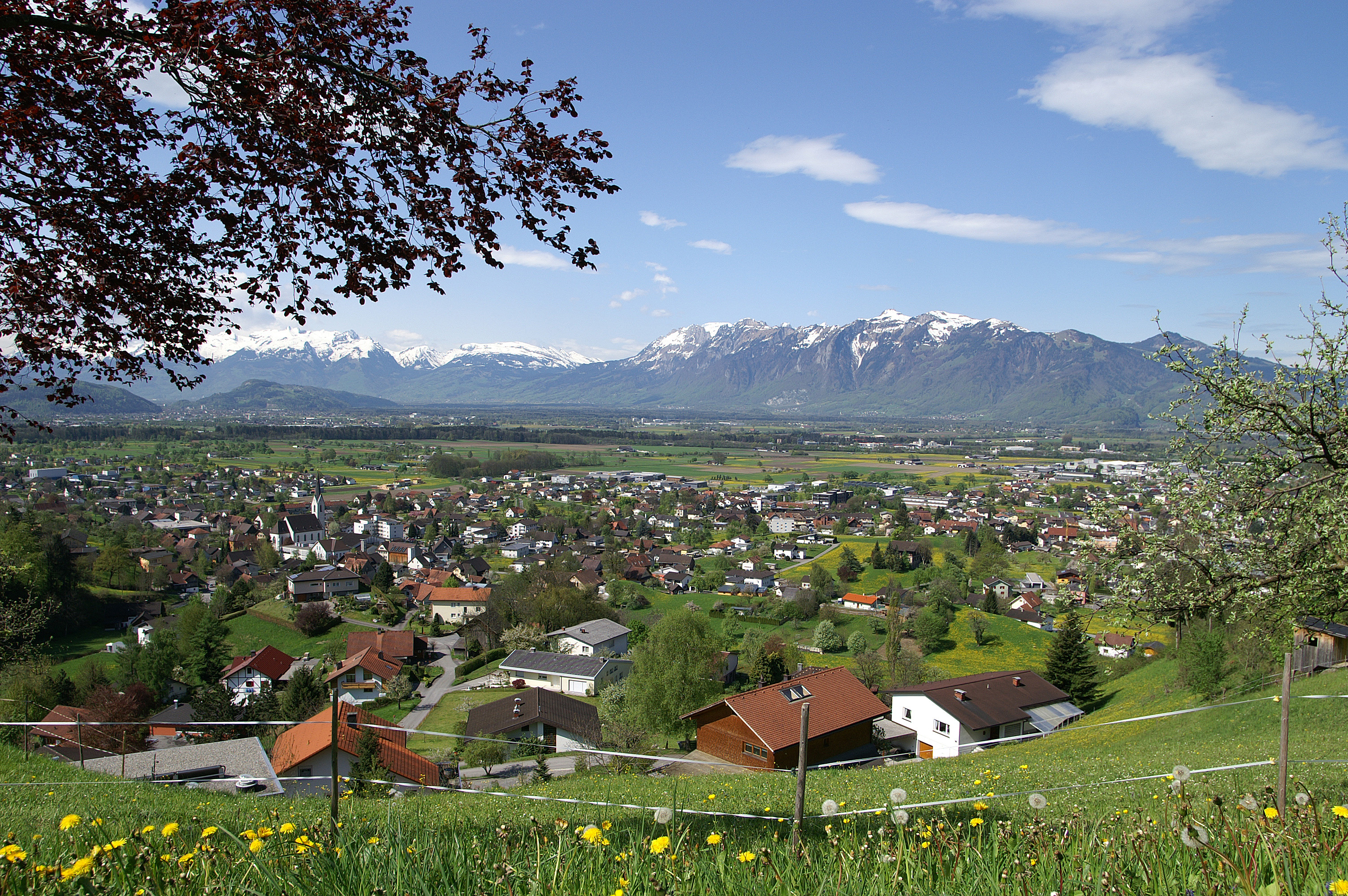

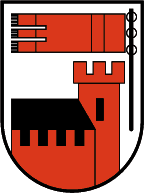
- Coat of arms

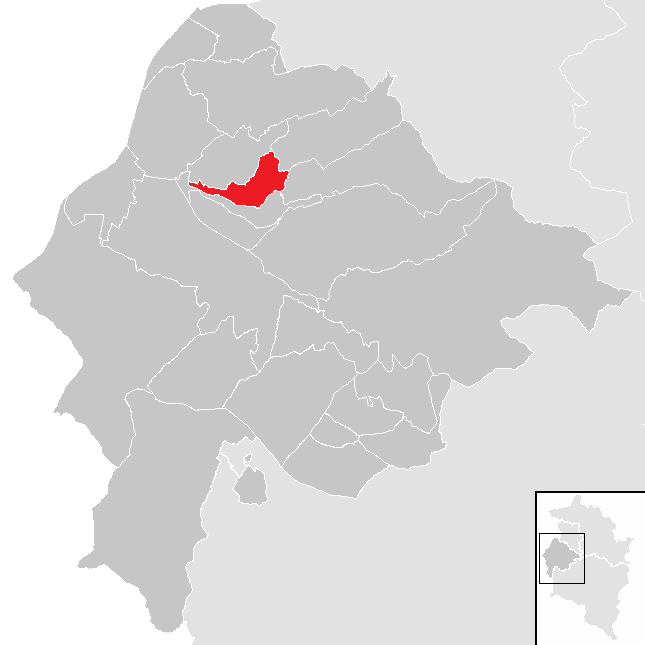
- Location in the district

- Location within Austria
- Coordinates: 47°17′59″N 09°39′00″E
- Country: Austria
- State: Vorarlberg
- District: Feldkirch

Government
  - Mayor: Dietmar Summer

Area
  - Total: 3.08 km^{2} (1.19 sq mi)
- Elevation: 486 m (1,594 ft)

Population (2018-01-01)
  - Total: 2,075
  - Density: 674/km^{2} (1,740/sq mi)
- Time zone: UTC+1 (CET)
  - Summer (DST): UTC+2 (CEST)
- Postal code: 6837
- Area code: 05523
- Vehicle registration: FK
- Website: www.gemeinde-weiler.at

Weiler (German pronunciation: [ˈvaɪlɐ]) is a municipality in the district of Feldkirch in the Austrian state of Vorarlberg.

== Population ==
Historical population
Year	Pop.	±%
1869	383	—
1880	408	+6.5%
1890	427	+4.7%
1900	505	+18.3%
1910	595	+17.8%
1923	548	−7.9%
1934	570	+4.0%
1939	562	−1.4%
1951	670	+19.2%
1961	833	+24.3%
1971	1,182	+41.9%
1981	1,350	+14.2%
1991	1,536	+13.8%
2001	1,748	+13.8%
2011	2,016	+15.3%
