= Johann Kindle =

Liechtenstein politician (born 1944)

Member of the Landtag of Liechtenstein for Oberland
- In office 2 February 1986 – 7 February 1993

Personal details
- Born: 21 September 1944 (age 81); Triesen, Liechtenstein
- Political party: Progressive Citizens' Party
- Spouse: Margina Frick (m. 1968)
- Children: 2

Johann Kindle (born 21 September 1944) is an accountant and politician from Liechtenstein who served in the Landtag of Liechtenstein from 1986 to 1993.

He attended school in Vaduz. He worked as an accountant at Hovalwerk AG from 1963 to 1968 and then at Treuhand Admintrust from 1968 to 1973. He was the municipal treasurer of Triesen from 1973 to 2008, and was a member of the Triesen municipal council from 2011 to 2015 as a member of the Progressive Citizens' Party.

== Bibliography ==
- Vogt, Paul (1987). 125 Jahre Landtag (in German). Vaduz: Landtag of the Principality of Liechtenstein.
