= Hilmar Ospelt =

Deputy Prime Minister of Liechtenstein from 1980 to 1986

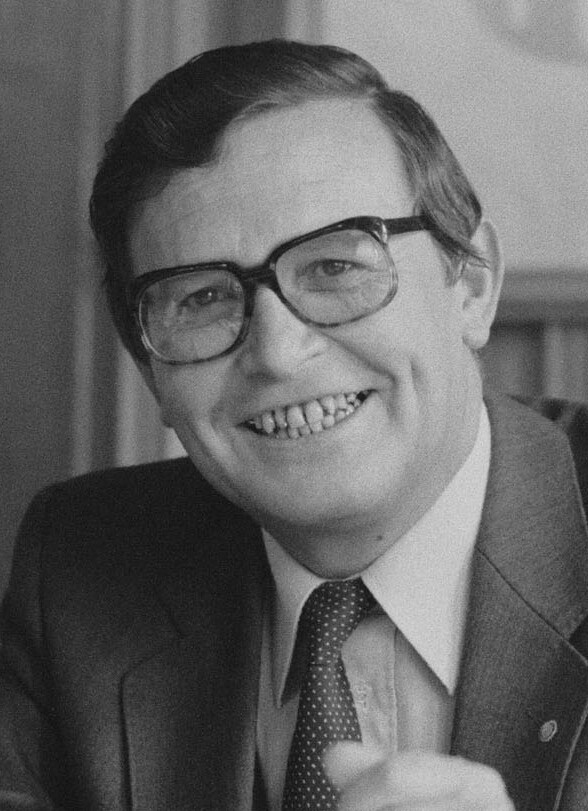
- Ospelt in 1980

Deputy Prime Minister of Liechtenstein
- In office 1 July 1980 – 2 February 1986
- Monarch: Franz Joseph II
- Prime Minister: Hans Brunhart
- Preceded by: Walter Kieber
- Succeeded by: Herbert Wille

Member of the Landtag of Liechtenstein for Oberland
- In office 3 February 1974 – 1 July 1980

Mayor of Vaduz
- In office 1972 – June 1980
- Deputy: Arthur Konrad
- Preceded by: Meinrad Ospelt
- Succeeded by: Arthur Konrad

Personal details
- Born: 6 May 1929 Vaduz, Liechtenstein
- Died: 22 February 2020 (aged 90) Vaduz, Liechtenstein
- Party: Progressive Citizens' Party
- Spouse(s): Lore Harder (m. 1962, divorced) Hertha Walser (m. 1981)
- Relations: Josef Anton Amann (great-grandfather) Franz Amann (grandfather); Reinold Amann (great-uncle) Florian Meier (great-nephew)
- Children: 2
- Parent(s): Hermann Ospelt; Ida Ospelt-Amann

Hilmar Ospelt (6 May 1929 – 22 February 2020) was a political figure from Liechtenstein who served as the Deputy Prime Minister of Liechtenstein from 1980 to 1986. He previously served in the Landtag of Liechtenstein from 1974 to 1980 and as the mayor of Vaduz from 1972 to 1980.

== Early life and career ==
Ospelt was born on 6 May 1929 in Vaduz as the son of Hermann Ospelt and poet Ida Ospelt-Amann. From 1941 to 1949 he attended high school in the city, then from 1949 to 1952 he studied botany, physics and chemistry in the University of Basel. He participated in a study visit to Syracruse in 1957.

From 1954 to 1955 he was a teacher at the Pfister Institute in Oberägeri, then from 1955 to 1972 a teacher in the state secondary school in Vaduz. In 1956, He was a member of the committee formed to establish a state library in Liechtenstein.

== Political career ==
From 1963 to 1972 he was a member of the Vaduz municipal council. He was deputy mayor of the city from 1969 to 1972, then mayor of Vaduz until 1980 as a member of the Progressive Citizens' Party. He was also a member of the Landtag of Liechtenstein from 1974 to 1980.

Ospelt resigned both his position as both mayor and as a Landtag member on 1 July 1980 due to him being appointed Deputy Prime Minister of Liechtenstein under the government of Hans Brunhart, succeeding Walter Kieber. In this position, he held the ministries of youth and sport, economy, transport and justice. In the 1982 Liechtenstein general election, Ospelt was the Progressive Citizens' Party's candidate for prime minister. He was a supporter of Women's suffrage in Liechtenstein. Of which, during his tenure, women received voting rights for the first time, following a referendum on the topic (among men only) in 1984. He was succeeded by Herbert Wille on 2 February 1986.

In 1991, Ospelt once again ran for mayor of Vaduz, though was unsuccessful. He was the chairman of the board of directors of the Liechtenstein gas supply from 1985 to 1997. He was the president of the Switzerland-Liechtenstein society from 1992 to 1994 and an honorary member of the Rotary Club of Liechtenstein from 1988. From 1990 he was an honorary member of the Turkish association in Liechtenstein.

== Personal life ==
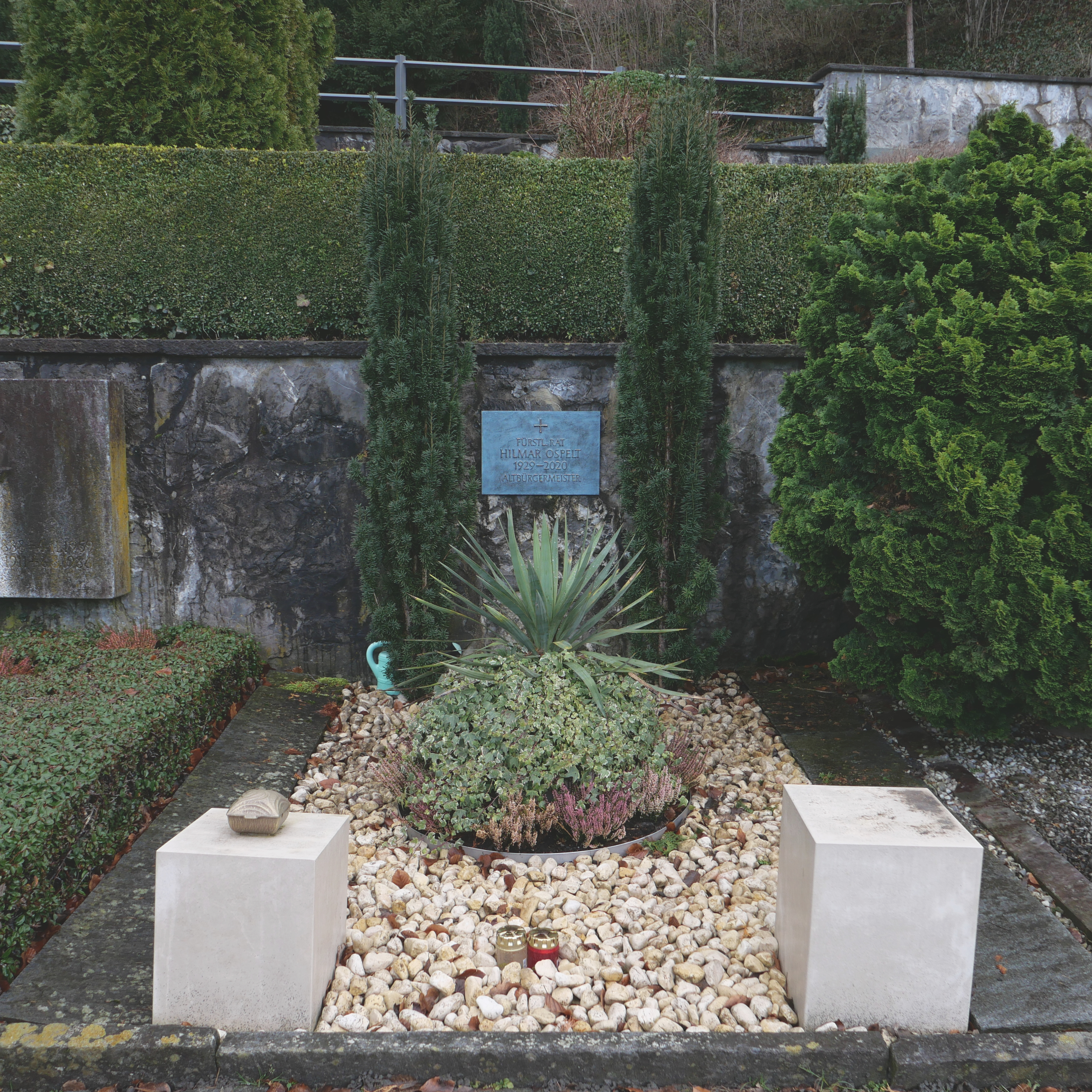
Ospelt's grave in the Vaduz cemetery.

Ospelt married Lore Harder, an actress, on 3 August 1962 and they had two children together, but they got divorced at an unspecified time. He then went on to marry Hertha Walser on 10 July 1981.

He died on 22 February 2020, aged 90 years old. He is buried in the cemetery in Vaduz. His great-nephew, Florian Meier, has also been the mayor of Vaduz since 2024.

== Honours ==
- Austria: Grand Decoration of Honour in Silver for Services to the Republic of Austria (1984)
- Liechtenstein: Commander's Cross of the Order of Merit of the Principality of Liechtenstein (1981)
