= United Nations Security Council Resolution 663 =

UN Security Council Resolution 663
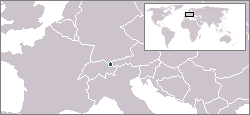
- Location of Liechtenstein
- Date: 14 August 1990
- Meeting no.: 2,936
- Code: S/RES/663 (Document)
- Subject: Admission of new Members to the UN: Liechtenstein
- Voting summary: 15 voted for; None voted against; None abstained
- Result: Adopted

Security Council composition
- Permanent members: China; France; Soviet Union; United Kingdom; United States
- Non-permanent members: Canada; Colombia; Côte d'Ivoire; Cuba; Ethiopia; Finland; Malaysia; Romania; Yemen; Zaire

United Nations Security Council resolution 663, adopted unanimously on 14 August 1990, related to Liechtenstein's application to join the United Nations as a member. The resolution stated as follows: After examining the application of the Principality of Liechtenstein for membership in the United Nations, the Council recommended to the General Assembly that Liechtenstein be admitted as a member of the United Nations.

== See also ==
- Member states of the United Nations
- List of United Nations Security Council Resolutions 601 to 700 (1987–1991)
