= Louis Gassner =

Liechtenstein politician (born 1945)

Member of the Landtag of Liechtenstein for Oberland
- In office 7 February 1982 – 5 March 1989

Personal details
- Born: 12 January 1945 (age 80) Triesenberg, Liechtenstein
- Party: Progressive Citizens' Party
- Spouse: Dorli Bühler (m. 1977)
- Children: 2

Louis Gassner (born 12 January 1945) is a politician and engineer from Liechtenstein who served in the Landtag of Liechtenstein from 1982 to 1989.

Gassner attended the Vaduz evening technical college and graduated with a speciality in civil engineering. He founded his own engineering business in 1973. From 1972 to 1983 he was a member of the Triesenberg municipal council as a member of the Progressive Citizens' Party, and he was a deputy member of the Landtag from 1978 to 1982 and again from 1989 to February 1993.

== Bibliography ==
- Vogt, Paul (1987). 125 Jahre Landtag (in German). Vaduz: Landtag of the Principality of Liechtenstein.
