= Hans Brunhart =

Prime Minister of Liechtenstein from 1978 to 1993

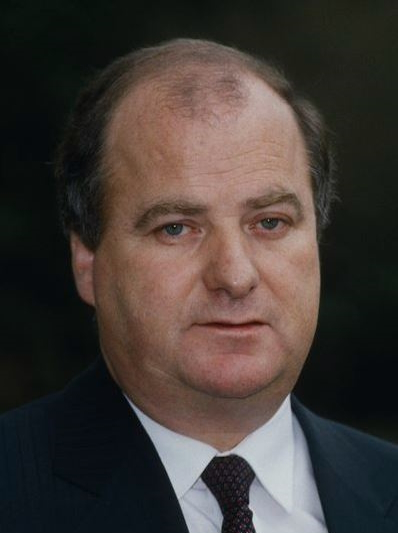
- Brunhart in 1991

Prime Minister of Liechtenstein
- In office 26 April 1978 – 26 May 1993
- Monarchs: Franz Joseph II; Hans-Adam II
- Deputy: Walter Kieber (1978–1980); Hilmar Ospelt (1980–1986); Herbert Wille (1986–1993)
- Preceded by: Walter Kieber
- Succeeded by: Markus Büchel

Deputy Prime Minister of Liechtenstein
- In office 27 March 1974 – 26 April 1978
- Monarch: Franz Joseph II
- Prime Minister: Walter Kieber
- Preceded by: Alfred Hilbe
- Succeeded by: Walter Kieber

Personal details
- Born: 28 March 1945 (age 81) Balzers, Liechtenstein
- Party: Patriotic Union
- Spouse: Bernadette Biedermann (m. 1972)
- Relations: Arthur Brunhart (brother)
- Children: 3

Hans Brunhart (German pronunciation: [ˈhans ˈbʁuːnhaʁt]; born 28 March 1945) is a politician and journalist from Liechtenstein who served as Prime Minister of Liechtenstein from 1978 to 1993. He previously served as Deputy Prime Minister of Liechtenstein from 1974 to 1978, under the government of Walter Kieber.

== Early life ==
Brunhart was born on 28 March 1945 in Balzers as the son of Andreas Brunhart and Rosa (née Frick) as one of seven children. He attended secondary school in the municipality and in Mörschwil. From 1966 to 1972 he studied German studies in Freiburg im Breisgau and Basel. From 1972 to 1974, he was the director of the Liechtenstein State Library and Liechtenstein National Archives.

== Prime Minister of Liechtenstein ==
Brunhart was Deputy Prime Minister of Liechtenstein under the government of Walter Kieber from 27 March 1974 to 26 April 1978. He was the eighth Prime Minister of Liechtenstein, serving from 26 April 1978 to 26 May 1993. The 1978 Liechtenstein general election resulted in a win for the Patriotic Union (VU), and Brunhart was appointed as Prime Minister.

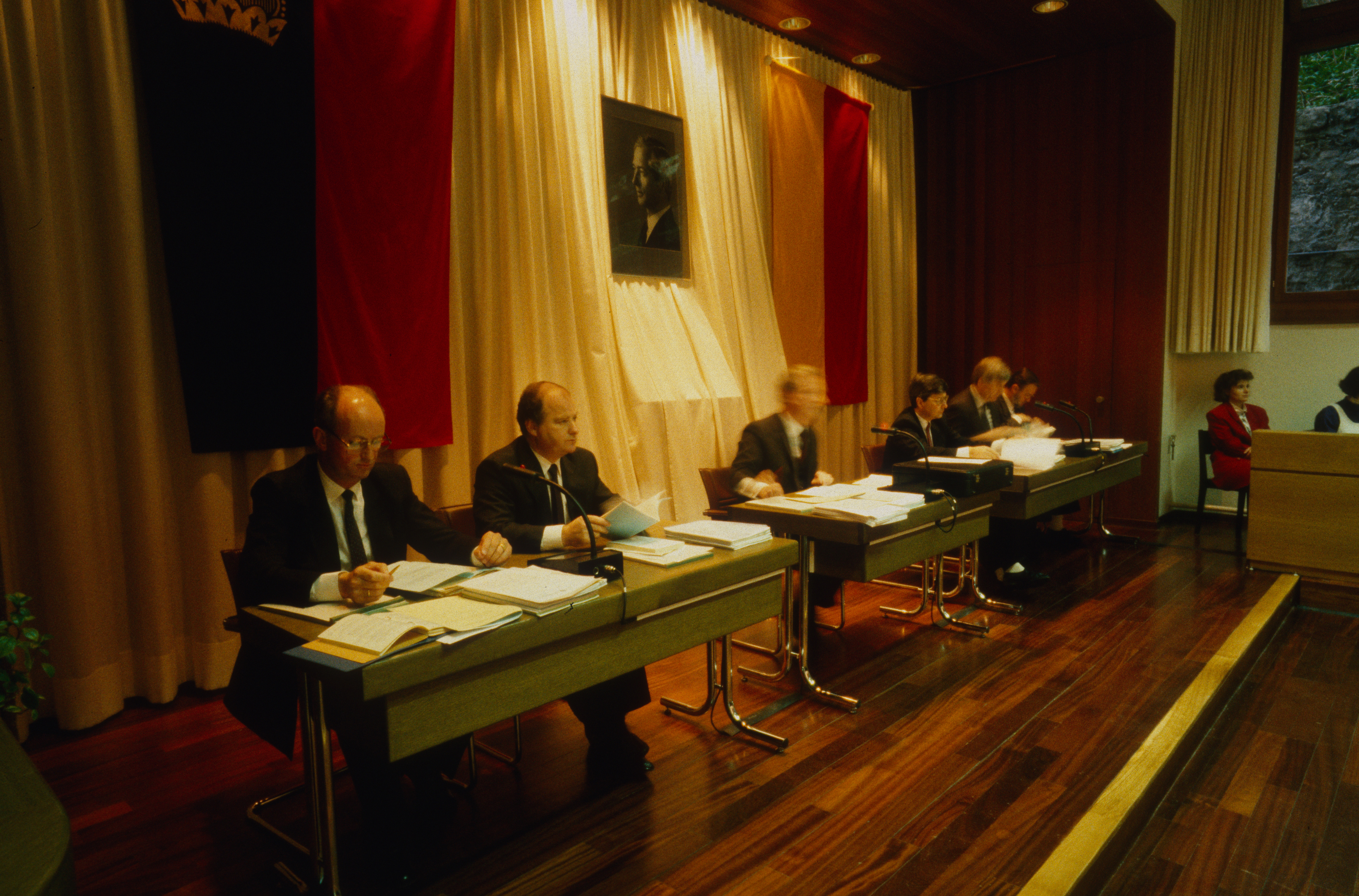
Brunhart (second from left) during a session in the Landtag of Liechtenstein on 24 March 1991.

Brunhart's tenure was marked by significant changes in Liechtenstein's foreign policy. In 1978, Liechtenstein joined the Council of Europe, and Brunhart, along with Prince Nikolaus of Liechtenstein, held the presidency of the Committee of Ministers in 1987. In addition, Liechtenstein became a full member of the United Nations in 1990 following Security Council Resolution 663. Under his government, Liechtenstein became a member of the European Free Trade Association in its own right in 1991.

His government also oversaw increased environmental protection in Liechtenstein with the passing of the Clean Air Act in 1985, the Waste Act in 1988, and the Soil Protection Act in 1990.

During his tenure, women received voting rights for the first time, following a referendum on the topic (among men only) in 1984.

=== 1992 crisis ===
On 6 December 1992 a referendum was to be held in Switzerland on a federal resolution on the accession to the European Economic Area (EEA). In correspondence with the customs union between the two countries, a similar referendum was to be held in Liechtenstein at a similar time.

When planning on the date for the Liechtenstein referendum regarding accession to the EEA, prince Hans-Adam II called for it to be held in advance of the corresponding one in Switzerland, against the wishes of the Brunhart and the Landtag of Liechtenstein. On 28 October 1992, he threatened to dismiss the Landtag and Brunhart's government over the dispute and appoint an acting prime minister in his place.

In response approximately 2000 people demonstrated in front of the government house in Vaduz. The same day, the government and Hans-Adam II negotiated and came to an agreement that scheduled the referendum after the corresponding one in Switzerland, though notably it affirmed that Liechtenstein would commit to agreements with the EEA despite the result in Switzerland. Liechtenstein subsequently joined the EEA in May the same year.

=== Resignation ===
The February 1993 Liechtenstein general election resulted in a win for the Progressive Citizens' Party, despite the VU receiving a slightly higher share of the vote. As a result, Brunhart resigned on 26 May 1993 and was succeeded by Markus Büchel.

== Later life ==
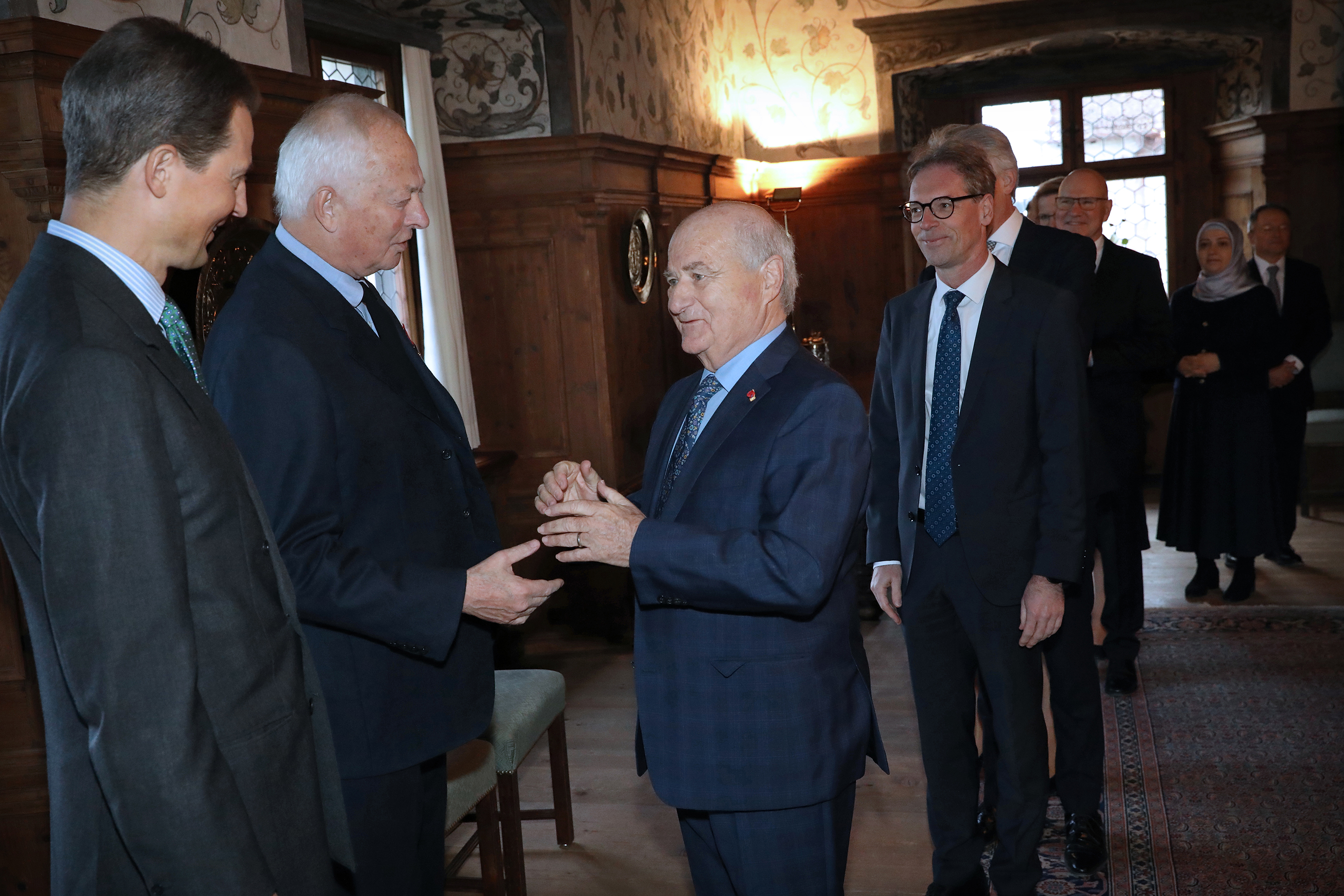
Brunhart (centre) with Hans-Adam II in 2025

From 1996 to 2012, Brunhart was chairman of the board directors of the VP Bank. He has been an honorary member of the VU since 1996 and is occasionally still consulted in politics, most recently by Daniel Risch in 2022. In 1995, Brunhart founded the annual magazine Balzner Neujahrsblätter, and has remained an editor since.

From 2004 to 2006 he was president of the Liechtenstein-Switzerland society and since 2004 president of the board of trustees in Haus Gutenberg foundation in Balzers. He was a founding member and first president of the Association of Liechtenstein Charitable Foundations and Trusts from 2010 to 2020.

== Personal life ==
Brunhart married Bernadette Biedermann, a women's suffragist, on 18 November 1972 and they have three children together. His brother, Arthur Brunhart, served as President of the Landtag of Liechtenstein from 2009 to 2013.

== Honours ==
- Austria: Gold Medal of the Decoration of Honour for Services to the Republic of Austria
- Liechtenstein: Grand Cross of the Order of Merit of the Principality of Liechtenstein
- Holy See: Grand Cross of the Order of Pope Pius IX (1983)

== See also ==
- Hans Brunhart cabinet
- Politics of Liechtenstein
