= 1978 Liechtenstein general election =

- 3 February 1978
- 15 seats in the Landtag; 8 seats needed for a majority
- Turnout: 95.72% (▼0.38pp)
Party	Leader	Vote %	Seats	+/–
VU	Hans Brunhart	49.15	8	+1
FBP	Walter Kieber	50.85	7	−1
This lists parties that won seats. See the complete results below.
Results by constituency
Prime Minister of Liechtenstein before	Prime Minister of Liechtenstein after
Walter Kieber; FBP	Hans Brunhart; VU

General elections were held in Liechtenstein on 3 February 1978 to elect the 15 members of the Landtag. The Patriotic Union (VU) won a majority of eight seats, while the Progressive Citizens' Party (FBP) won seven. Voter turnout was 95.7%.

Incumbent prime minister Walter Kieber of the FBP sought re-election for a second term, while the VU nominated Hans Brunhart for the position. Following the election, the FBP and VU formed a renewed coalition government, ultimately under the leadership of Brunhart, with Kieber becoming deputy prime minister. The election was followed by 15 years of VU-led governments under Brunhart.

== Background ==
In the 1974 elections the Progressive Citizens' Party (FBP) won a majority of eight seats, while the Patriotic Union (VU) won seven. As a result, the FBP and VU formed a coalition government, with Walter Kieber becoming prime minister.

Kieber's term was characterized by introducing divorce and civil marriage laws in 1974. In August 1975, Kieber was one of the chairmen and signatories of the Helsinki Accords in Helsinki, and his government oversaw Liechtenstein applying to the Council of Europe in 1977. His government also saw the passing of controversial tax increases and reduction in payment to Liechtenstein's municipalities in the Landtag in order to reduce deficit spending. However, both policies were rejected in referendums held in 1975.

== Electoral system ==
The 15 members of the Landtag were elected via open list proportional representation from two constituencies, Oberland with 9 seats and Unterland with 6 seats. Voters voted for a party list and then may have struck through candidates for whom they did not wish to cast a preferential vote, and may also have added names of candidates from other lists. The electoral threshold to win a seat was 8%. Landtag members sit for a four-year term. Once formed, the Landtag elected the prime minister and two government councillors who were then appointed by the reigning prince to govern in a cabinet. Only men aged 20 and above that had been resident in the country for at least one month prior to election day were eligible to vote.

A FBP-initiated referendum was held in November 1975 that proposed to re-introduce the majority clause that had been abolished in 1973. Under this system, the party with the most votes would automatically win the most seats in the Landtag. However, the proposal was narrowly rejected by voters.

== Campaign ==
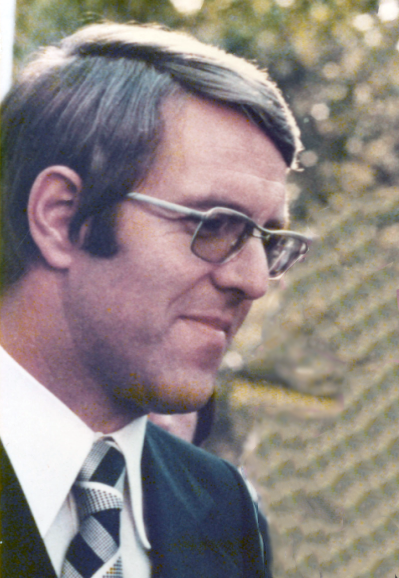
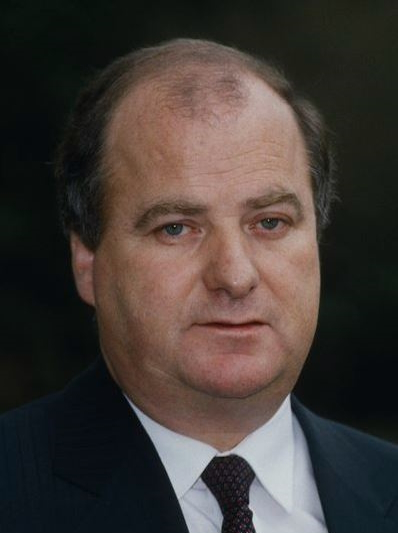
Walter Kieber (left) and Hans Brunhart (right) were the FBP and VU's respective nominations for prime minister

Kieber was re-nominated by the FBP for prime minister on 15 December 1977; the party argued for political continuity, and sought to retain its majority in the Landtag. For the first time, the party presented government candidates for the election — Georg Malin and Hans Gassner. The FBP in its newspaper, the Liechtensteiner Volksblatt, argued for a "factual election campaign". During the campaign, the FBP highlighted its achievements in environmental protection, advocated for greater support for the elderly and a return to "traditional values". The party's programme also included policies such as balancing the budget, improvements to healthcare, greater women's rights, reforms to the social security system, and expanding housing assistance.

The VU nominated the incumbent deputy prime minister, Hans Brunhart, for prime minister in December 1977; the party sought to gain a majority in the Landtag. The VU accused the FBP of failing to fulfil its promises, particularly in regards to providing swimming facilities and environmental protection. The VU also highlighted its achievements in foreign policy. During the campaign, the VU advocated for the introduction of widower's pensions in the Old-age and survivors insurance, tax relief for lower incomes, and lessening the restrictions for naturalization in Liechtenstein. The party's programme also included policies such as reducing excessive government bureaucracy, improving vocational education, and supporting the domestic workforce.

== Candidates ==
Candidates had the same eligibility criteria as voters. Political parties in Liechtenstein required the support of 30 voters from a constituency to be eligible to nominate a candidate list in it. A total of 30 candidates contested the election.

Oberland	FBP	VU
Oberland	Peter Marxer; Emanuel Vogt; Noldi Frommelt; Hilmar Ospelt; Josef Frommelt; Josef Biedermann; Louis Gassner; Klaus Wanger; Peter Frick	Karlheinz Ritter; Alfred Hilbe; Georg Gstöhl; Franz Beck; Wolfgang Feger; August Beck; Alfons Schädler; Ludwig Seger; Elias Nigg
Unterland	FBP	VU
Unterland	Gerard Batliner; Ernst Büchel; Armin Meier; Adolf Kranz; Hubert Oehri; Franz Elkuch	Walter Oehry; Werner Gstöhl; Hermann Hassler; Franz Meier; Anton Hoop; Franz Oehri
Source: Liechtensteiner Volksblatt

== Results ==
The VU received 49.2% of the vote, a 1.9% increase from 1974, and won a majority of eight seats, an increase of one. The FBP received 50.9%, a 0.8% increase from 1974 and won seven seats, a decrease of one. Despite the FBP receiving 1.7% more of the vote than the VU, the VU won more seats due to winning five seats in the Oberland electoral district by a narrow margin.

A total of 4,362 ballots were cast, resulting in a 95.4% voter turnout.

Party	Votes	%	Seats	+/–
Patriotic Union	18,244	49.15	8	–1
Progressive Citizens' Party	18,872	50.85	7	–
Total	37,116	100.00	15	0
Valid votes	4,625	99.04		
Invalid/blank votes	45	0.96		
Total votes	4,670	100.00		
Registered voters/turnout	4,879	95.72		
Source: Vogt

=== By electoral district ===
Electoral district	Seats	Party	Elected members	Substitutes	Votes	%	Seats	+/–
Oberland	9	Patriotic Union	Karlheinz Ritter; Alfons Schädler; Franz Beck; Wolfgang Feger; Georg Gstöhl	Ludwig Seger; August Beck; Alfred Hilbe; Elias Nigg	14,058	50.03	5	▲1
Oberland	9	Progressive Citizens' Party	Peter Marxer; Hilmar Ospelt; Noldi Frommelt; Josef Biedermann	Josef Frommelt; Emanuel Vogt; Louis Gassner; Klaus Wanger	14,040	49.97	4	▼1
Unterland	6	Progressive Citizens' Party	Gerard Batliner; Ernst Büchel; Armin Meier	Adolf Kranz; Hubert Oehri; Franz Elkuch	4,832	53.58	3	0
Unterland	6	Patriotic Union	Franz Meier; Hermann Hassler; Walter Oehry	Anton Hoop; Franz Oehri; Werner Gstöhl	4,186	46.42	3	0
Source: Liechtensteiner Volksblatt

== Aftermath ==
Following the elections, the VU invited the FBP to begin negotiations for a renewed coalition government, which the FBP accepted. The VU and FBP entered into a renewed coalition government, ultimately under the leadership of Brunhart. Due to ongoing issues such as negotiations with Switzerland and reforms to the company law in Liechtenstein, at the request of Franz Joseph II, Prince of Liechtenstein, Kieber became deputy prime minister. The new government was sworn in on 26 April 1978. On the first session of the newly-elected Landtag on 21 April, Karlheinz Ritter of the VU became President of the Landtag, with Gerard Batliner of the FBP as vice president.

Due to the FBP's defeat the election, the party put forward another initiative to reintroduce the majority clause for elections. However, the proposal was again narrowly rejected by voters in a referendum held in 1981, albeit by a wider margin than in 1975.
