= 1970 Liechtenstein general election =

- 1 February 1970
- 15 seats in the Landtag; 8 seats needed for a majority
- Turnout: 94.80% (▲0.54pp)
| Party | Leader | Vote % | Seats | +/– |
|---|---|---|---|---|
| VU | Alfred Hilbe | 49.57 | 8 | +1 |
| FBP | Gerard Batliner | 48.83 | 7 | −1 |
This lists parties that won seats. See the complete results below.
Results by constituency
| Prime Minister before | Prime Minister after |
|---|---|
| Gerard Batliner; FBP | Alfred Hilbe; VU |

General elections were held in Liechtenstein on 1 February 1970 to elect the 15 members of the Landtag. The Patriotic Union (VU) won eight seats and gained a majority for the first time since its founding in 1936, while the Progressive Citizens' Party (FBP) won seven. Voter turnout was 94.8%.

Incumbent prime minister Gerard Batliner of the FBP sought re-election for a third term, while the VU nominated Alfred Hilbe for the position. The Christian Social Party (CSP) also contested the election, but failed to win any seats in the Landtag. During campaigning, the FBP presented itself as a party of stability and experience, while the VU accused the former of political stagnation and for a change change in government leadership. Following the elections, Batliner resigned and the coalition government between the VU and FBP was placed under the leadership of Hilbe. The new government was sworn in on 18 March 1970, ending 42 years of FBP-led governments.

== Background ==
In the 1966 elections, the Progressive Citizens' Party (FBP) won eight seats and retained its majority while the Patriotic Union (VU) won seven. The coalition government under the leadership of prime minister Gerard Batliner remained.

Batliner's second term in office was characterised by the establishment of the Association for Special Education Assistance in 1967 and the introduction of unemployment Insurance in 1969. It also saw debate regarding the introduction of women's suffrage in Liechtenstein, with a bipartisan referendum on the issue being rejected by voters in 1968.

== Electoral system ==
The 15 members of the Landtag were elected by open list proportional representation from two constituencies, Oberland with 9 seats and Unterland with 6 seats. Voters voted for a party list and then may have struck through candidates for whom they did not wish to cast a preferential vote, and may also have added names of candidates from other lists. The electoral threshold to win a seat was 18%. Landtag members sit for a four-year term. Once formed, the Landtag elected the prime minister and two government councillors who were then appointed by the reigning prince to govern in a cabinet. The elections used a majority clause, where the party with the most votes would automatically win the most seats. Only men aged 20 and above that had been resident in the country for at least one month prior to election day were eligible to vote.

== Campaign ==
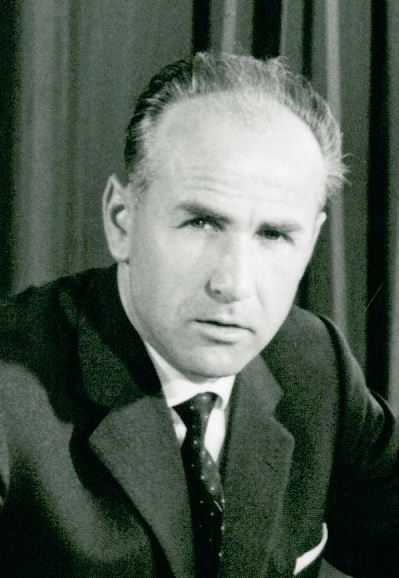
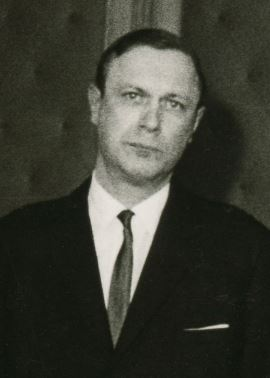
Gerard Batliner (left) and Alfred Hilbe (right) were the FBP and VU's respective nominations for prime minister

The FBP's candidate for prime minister was the incumbent Batliner. The FBP presented itself as a party of stability and experience. At the same time, the party highlighted its internal reforms, which allowed for greater youth participation and allowed women to participate in internal party procedures for the first time, arguing that it was a modern party that could adapt to the times. The FBP criticized the VU for demanding a change in government, but supposedly offering no alternatives. During campaigning, it also advocated for improving relations between the state and Liechtenstein's municipalities through policies such as joint projects. The FBP's programme also included policies such as expanding health insurance, building retirement homes for the elderly, workers' rights, and European integration.

The VU nominated incumbent deputy prime minister, Alfred Hilbe, for prime minister in January 1970. The party sought to obtain a majority in the Landtag. Furthermore, it argued that Liechtenstein required a change in leadership and that the VU was ready to assume leadership of the government. Hilbe and the VU accused the FBP of stagnation, undermining the political minority, and hindering cooperation through "arbitrariness". The VU advocated for improved political education for the youth, increased youth rapport with politicians, and equal employment opportunities for young men and women. Other issues addressed by the VU included expanding unemployment insurance, promoting home ownership, supporting families, and cooperation with the European Communities.

The Christian Social Party (CSP) campaigned through its newspaper, Der Liechtensteiner. The party advocated for electoral reform, and stated that the electoral system disadvantaged third parties. For this reason, as an act of protest, the party did not present candidates in the Oberland electoral district, and only for Unterland. The CSP accused both the FBP and VU of acting undemocratically, including allegedly incentivising voters away from the CSP in 1966; the party presented itself as an alternative to the FBP and VU. The party's programme included policies such as tax relief for workers, the introduction of health insurance, and social housing.

== Candidates ==
Candidates had the same eligibility criteria as voters. Political parties in Liechtenstein required the support of 30 voters from a constituency to be eligible to nominate a candidate list in it. A total of 32 candidates contested the election.

| Oberland | FBP | VU | |
| Oberland | Alexander Frick; Peter Marxer; Josef Büchel; Josef Frommelt; Hans Verling; Arnold Schurte; Gerold Hilbe; Gustav Jehle; Emanuel Vogt | Karlheinz Ritter; Roman Gassner; Johann Beck; Franz Beck; Otto Hasler; Herbert Kindle; Georg Gstöhl; Wolfgang Feger; Eugen Schädler | |
| Unterland | FBP | VU | CSP |
| Unterland | Ernst Büchel; Georg Malin; Hugo Wohlwend; Anton Gerner; Heinz Büchel; Werner Gstöhl | Franz Nägele; Cyrill Büchel; Alois Kind; Eugen Hasler; Anton Marxer; Gebhard Näscher | Fritz Kaiser; Rupert Walser |
Source: Liechtensteiner Volksblatt

== Results ==
The VU received 49.57% of the vote, a 6.78% increase from 1966, and won a majority of eight seats, an increase of one. It was the first time that the party achieved a majority since its founding in 1936. The FBP received 48.83%, a 0.36% increase from 1966, and won seven seats, a decrease of one. The CSP saw its vote share decrease from 8.74% to 1.6%, and won no seats.

A total of 4,085 ballots were cast, resulting in a 94.8% voter turnout.

| Party | Votes | % | Seats | +/– |
|---|---|---|---|---|
| Patriotic Union | 2,008 | 49.57 | 8 | +1 |
| Progressive Citizens' Party | 1,978 | 48.83 | 7 | –1 |
| Christian Social Party | 65 | 1.60 | 0 | 0 |
| Total | 4,051 | 100.00 | 15 | 0 |
| Valid votes | 4,051 | 99.17 | | |
| Invalid/blank votes | 34 | 0.83 | | |
| Total votes | 4,085 | 100.00 | | |
| Registered voters/turnout | 4,309 | 94.80 | | |
Source: Vogt

=== By electoral district ===
| Electoral district | Seats | Electorate | Party | Elected members | Substitutes | Votes | % | Seats | +/– |
|---|---|---|---|---|---|---|---|---|---|
| Oberland | 9 | 2,946 | Patriotic Union | Roman Gassner; Karlheinz Ritter; Johann Beck; Herbert Kindle; Franz Beck | Otto Hasler; Georg Gstöhl; Wolfgang Feger; Eugen Schädler | 1,456 | 52.9 | 5 | 0 |
| Oberland | 9 | 2,946 | Progressive Citizens' Party | Peter Marxer; Alexander Frick; Emanuel Vogt; Hans Verling | Arnold Schurte; Josef Büchel; Josef Frommelt; Gustav Jehle | 1,295 | 47.1 | 4 | 0 |
| Unterland | 6 | 1,363 | Progressive Citizens' Party | Ernst Büchel; Georg Malin; Anton Gerner | Hugo Wohlwend; Alois Kind; Gebhard Näscher | 683 | 52.5 | 3 | ▼1 |
| Unterland | 6 | 1,363 | Patriotic Union | Eugen Hasler; Cyrill Büchel; Franz Nägele | Anton Marxer; Werner Gstöhl; Heinz Büchel | 552 | 42.5 | 3 | ▲1 |
| Unterland | 6 | 1,363 | Christian Social Party | – | – | 65 | 5.0 | 0 | 0 |
Source: Vogt

== Aftermath ==
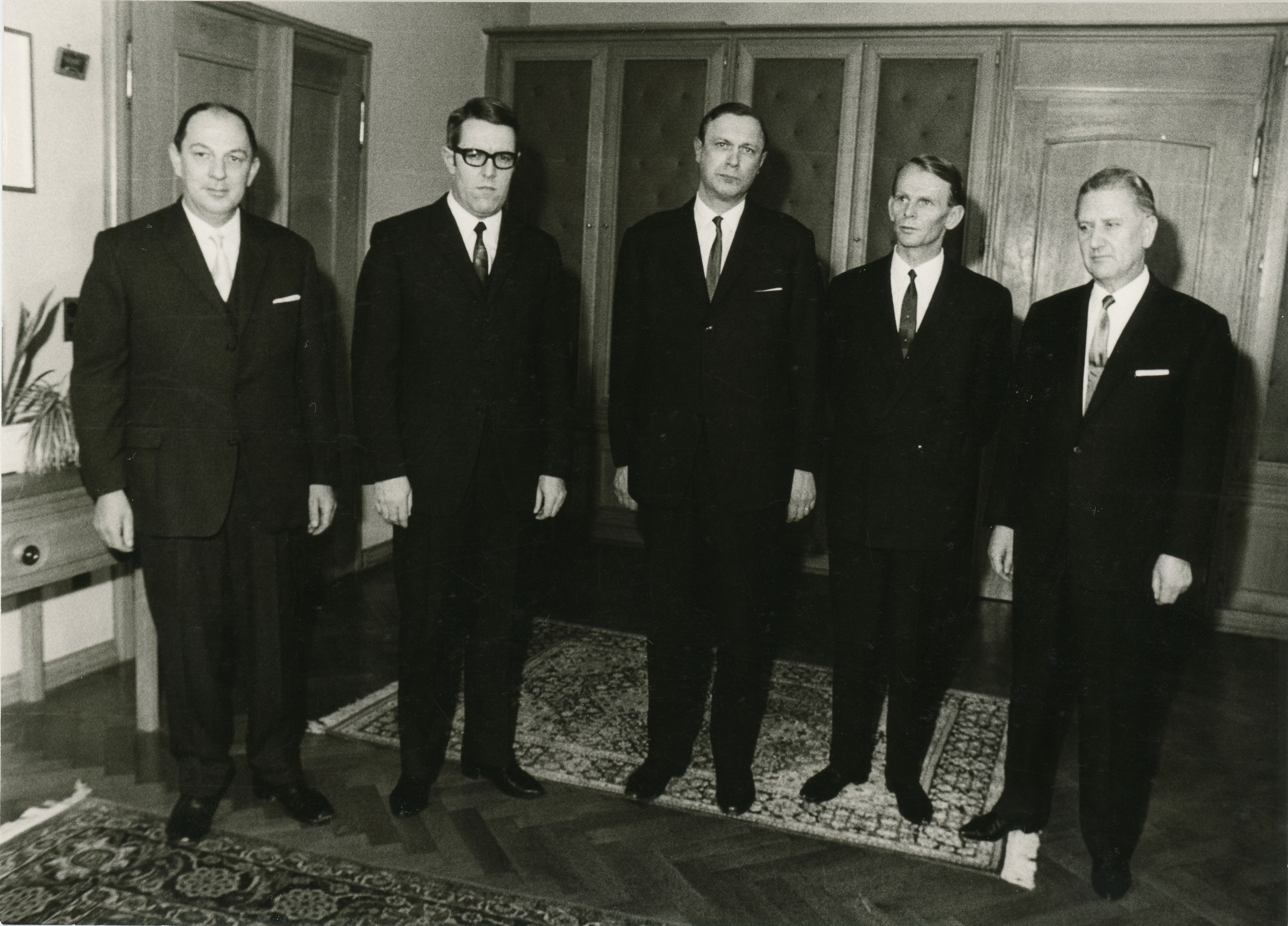
The government of Alfred Hilbe.

Following the elections, Batliner resigned as prime minister. The VU invited the FBP to begin negotiations for a renewed coalition government, which the FBP accepted. The VU declined a compromise between the two parties regarding spatial planning. Despite internal opposition from within the FBP, the VU and FBP eventually entered into a renewed coalition government in March, ultimately under the leadership of Hilbe. Following Batliner's resignation, the FBP nominated Walter Kieber for government instead, and as the junior party in the coalition, he became the deputy prime minister. The new government was sworn in on 18 March 1970. Karlheinz Ritter of the VU became President of the Landtag upon its first session on 13 March 1970, with Alexander Frick of the FBP as vice president.
