= 1974 Liechtenstein general election =

- 1 and 3 February 1974
- All 15 seats in the Landtag; 8 seats needed for a majority
- Turnout: 95.41% (▼0.39pp)
Party	Leader	Vote %	Seats	+/–
FBP	Walter Kieber	50.08	8	+1
VU	Alfred Hilbe	47.26	7	−1
This lists parties that won seats. See the complete results below.
Results by constituency
Prime Minister before	Prime Minister after
Alfred Hilbe; VU	Walter Kieber; FBP

General elections were held in Liechtenstein on 1 & 3 February 1974 to elect the 15 members of the Landtag. The Progressive Citizens' Party (FBP) won a majority of eight seats, while the Patriotic Union (VU) won seven. Voter turnout was 95.4%.

Incumbent prime minister Alfred Hilbe of the VU sought re-election for a second term, while the FBP nominated Walter Kieber for the position. The Christian Social Party (CSP) also contested the election, but it failed to reach the 8% electoral threshold to win seats in the Landtag and the party subsequently dissolved. Following the elections, Hilbe resigned and the FBP and VU formed a renewed coalition government, ultimately under the leadership of Kieber. The new government was sworn in on 27 March 1974.

== Background ==
In the 1970 elections the Patriotic Union (VU) won a majority of eight seats for the first time since its founding in 1936, while the Progressive Citizens' Party (FBP) won seven. As a result, the VU and FBP formed a coalition government, with Alfred Hilbe becoming prime minister.

Hilbe's term was characterized by reforms to the school system and marriage law in 1971 and 1974 respectively. It also saw efforts to introduce women's suffrage to Liechtenstein, with two referendums on the matter, supported by both the FBP and VU, being rejected in 1971 and 1973 respectively. Despite the rejections, the municipalities of Liechtenstein were given the power to introduce women's suffrage on a municipal level for their respective local elections.

== Electoral system ==
The 15 members of the Landtag were elected by open list proportional representation from two constituencies, Oberland with 9 seats and Unterland with 6 seats. Voters voted for a party list and then may have struck through candidates for whom they did not wish to cast a preferential vote, and may also have added names of candidates from other lists. The electoral threshold to win a seat was 8%. Landtag members sit for a four-year term. Once formed, the Landtag elected the prime minister and two government councillors who were then appointed by the reigning prince to govern in a cabinet. Only men aged 20 and above that had been resident in the country for at least one month prior to election day were eligible to vote.

The electoral threshold to win seats in the Landtag was reintroduced in 1973, but at a lowered 8%. In addition, the majority clause, in which the party with the most votes would automatically win the most seats, was abolished in 1973.

== Campaign ==
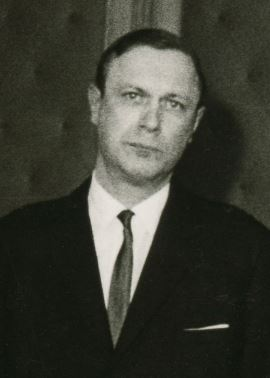
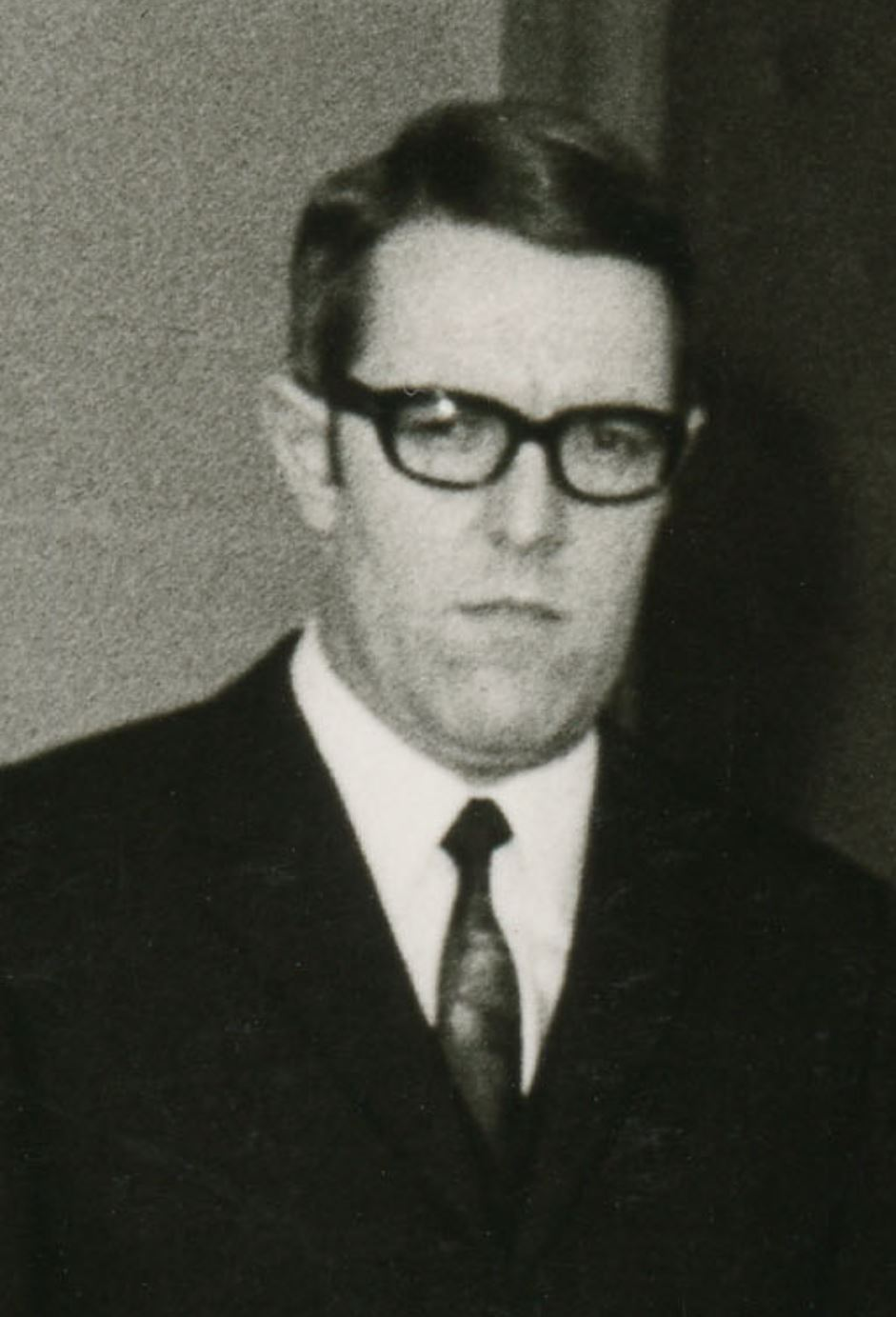
Alfred Hilbe (left) and Walter Kieber (right) were the VU and FBP's respective nominations for prime minister

The VU's candidate for prime minister was the incumbent Hilbe; the party sought to retain its majority in the Landtag. The VU accused the FBP of obstructionism since the latter's defeat in the 1970 elections, and also accused it of not providing alternative proposals on issues. The VU highlighted its achievements in foreign policy, particularly in regards to European integration and Liechtenstein's relationship with Switzerland. Furthermore, it highlighted its achievements in education while in office, such as by investing in schools and modernising teacher training and teaching methods. During the campaign, the VU advocated for policies such as increased political participation from within the population, reform of the state administration, improvements to the taxation system, reducing inflation, and greater women's rights.

The FBP's candidate for prime minister was incumbent deputy prime minister Walter Kieber. The FBP argued for "a new beginning" and avoiding political attacks during the election campaign. The FBP criticized the VU for failing to resolve problems, and argued that neither party could rely solely on their past achievements; the party presented itself as an alternative to the VU. During the campaign, the FBP advocated for the consolidation of the state administration in Liechtenstein to allow for greater organisation and coordination. Furthermore, the party also advocated for greater contact between the population, government, and Landtag by holding press conferences with the government, publishing government information bulletins, and establishing a broadcast network in Liechtenstein. The FBP's programme also included policies such as improvements to healthcare, establishing retirement homes, encouraging home ownership, and guaranteeing employment.

The Christian Social Party (CSP) campaigned on its newspaper, the Liechtensteiner Wochenspiegel (previously Der Liechtensteiner). The CSP contested four candidates in the election, and presented itself as an alternative to both the FBP and VU that would support either party on individual issues.

== Candidates ==
Candidates had the same eligibility criteria as voters. Political parties in Liechtenstein required the support of 30 voters from a constituency to be eligible to nominate a candidate list in it. A total of 34 candidates contested the election.

Oberland	FBP	VU	CSP
Oberland	Peter Marxer; Emanuel Vogt; Noldi Frommelt; Hilmar Ospelt; Eugen Büchel; Gerold Hilbe; Josef Frommelt; Rudolf Schädler; Josef Biedermann	Karlheinz Ritter; Johann Beck; Herbert Kindle; Franz Beck; Georg Gstöhl; Wolfgang Feger; Eugen Schädler; Horst Seger; Adolf Heeb	Bruno Frick; Roman Hermann
Unterland	FBP	VU	CSP
Unterland	Gerard Batliner; Ernst Büchel; Georg Malin; Anton Gerner; Hubert Öhri; Xaver Biedermann	Franz Nägele; Cyrill Büchel; Anton Marxer; Werner Gstöhl; Andreas Hoop; Hans Oehri	Fritz Kaiser; Rupert Walser
Source: Liechtensteiner Volksblatt

== Results ==
The FBP received 50.1% of the vote, a 1.3% increase from 1970, and won a majority of eight seats, an increase of one. The VU received 47.3%, a 2.3% decrease from 1970 and won seven seats, a decrease of one. The CSP saw its vote share increase from 1.6% to 2.6%, but failed to reach the electoral threshold of 8% to win seats.

A total of 4,362 ballots were cast, resulting in a 95.4% voter turnout.

Party	Votes	%	Seats	+/–
Progressive Citizens' Party	17,332	50.08	8	+1
Patriotic Union	16,356	47.26	7	–1
Christian Social Party	922	2.66	0	0
Total	34,610	100.00	15	0
Valid votes	4,320	99.04		
Invalid/blank votes	42	0.96		
Total votes	4,362	100.00		
Registered voters/turnout	4,572	95.41		
Source: Vogt

=== By electoral district ===
Electoral district	Seats	Party	Elected members	Substitutes	Votes	%	Seats	+/–
Oberland	9	Progressive Citizens' Party	Hilmar Ospelt; Emanuel Vogt; Peter Marxer; Noldi Frommelt; Josef Frommelt	Josef Biedermann; Gerold Hilbe; Eugen Büchel; Rudolf Schädler	12,819	48.78	5	▲1
Oberland	9	Patriotic Union	Karlheinz Ritter; Herbert Kindle; Johann Beck; Franz Beck	Georg Gstöhl; Wolfgang Feger; Adolf Heeb; Horst Seger	12,756	48.54	4	▼1
Oberland	9	Christian Social Party	–	–	705	2.68	0	0
Unterland	6	Progressive Citizens' Party	Gerard Batliner; Ernst Büchel; Anton Gerner	Georg Malin; Hubert Öhri; Xaver Biedermann	4,513	53.86	3	0
Unterland	6	Patriotic Union	Franz Nägele; Cyrill Büchel; Werner Gstöhl	Hubert Öhri; Andreas Hoop; Anton Marxer	3,600	42.96	3	0
Unterland	6	Christian Social Party	–	–	267	3.19	0	0
Source: Vogt

== Aftermath ==
Following the elections, Hilbe resigned as prime minister. The FBP invited the VU to begin negotiations for a renewed coalition government, which the VU accepted. The FBP and VU entered into a renewed coalition government, ultimately under the leadership of Kieber. As the junior party in the coalition, Hans Brunhart of the VU became deputy prime minister. The new government was sworn in on 27 March 1974. Former prime minister Gerard Batliner of the FBP became President of the Landtag, with Karlheinz Ritter of the VU as vice president.

The Liechtensteiner Vaterland, the VU's party newspaper, expressed disappointment in the result. It postulated that the party's defeat was due to voters switching between parties for personal advantages, and that it did not correlate to a rejection of the VU's programme by voters. The CSP dissolved following the election.
