= Alfred Hilbe cabinet =

Governing body of Liechtenstein (1970–1974)

- Government of Liechtenstein

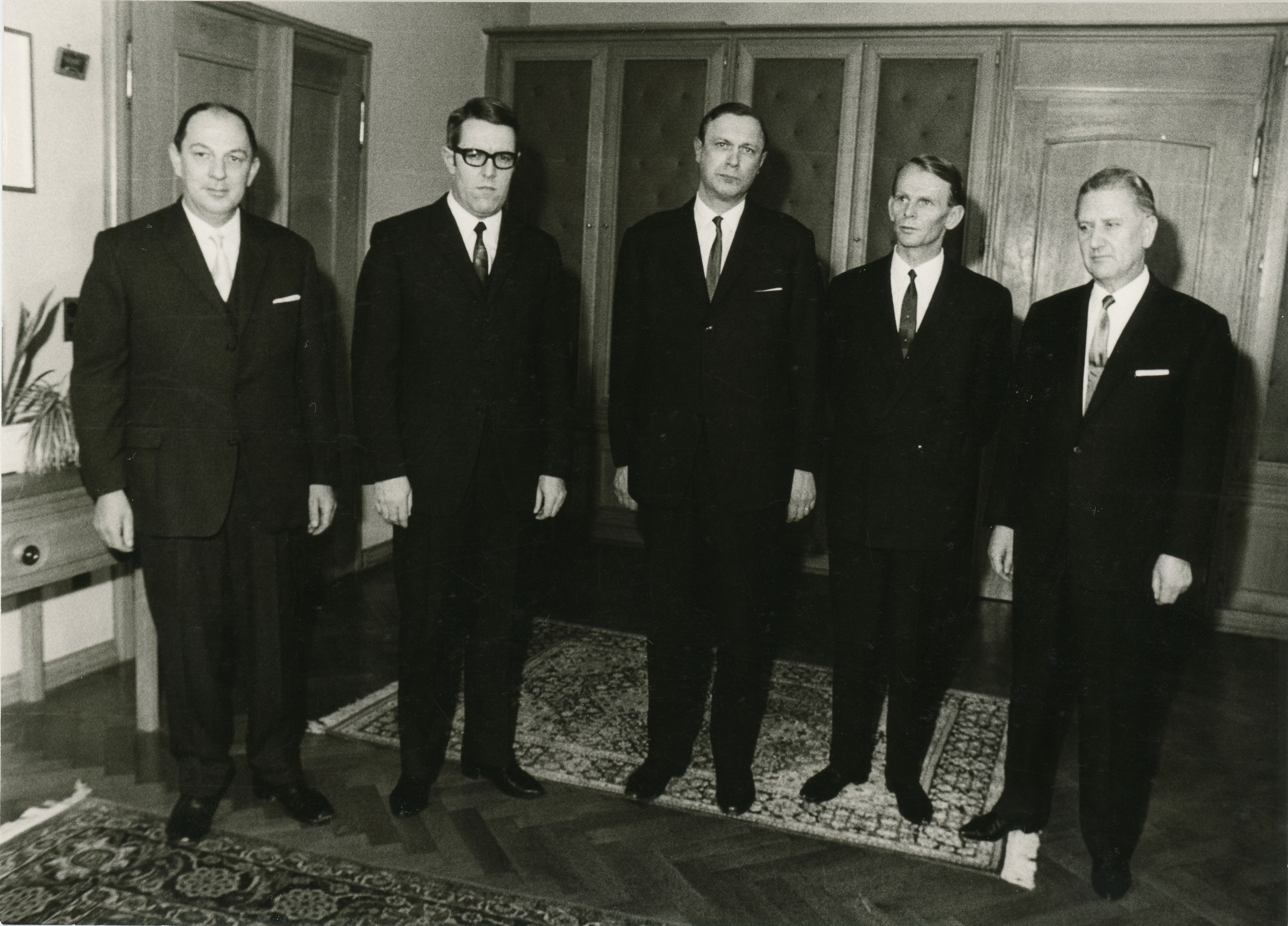
- Hilbe's cabinet in March 1970
- Date formed: 18 March 1970
- Date dissolved: 27 March 1974

People and organisations
- Head of state: Franz Joseph II
- Head of government: Alfred Hilbe
- Deputy head of government: Walter Kieber
- Total no. of members: 6
- Member parties: FBP; VU
- Status in legislature: Coalition

History
- Election: 1970
- Predecessor: Third Gerard Batliner cabinet
- Successor: Walter Kieber cabinet

The Alfred Hilbe cabinet was the governing body of Liechtenstein from 18 March 1970 to 27 March 1974. It was appointed by Franz Joseph II and chaired by Alfred Hilbe.

== History ==
The 1970 Liechtenstein general election resulted in a win for the Patriotic Union, making it the first time the party had held a majority since its formation in 1936. As a result, the Third Gerard Batliner cabinet was dissolved with Alfred Hilbe succeeding Gerard Batliner as Prime Minister of Liechtenstein.

During the government's term, it pioneered reforms of Liechtenstein's school system and efforts to address women's suffrage in Liechtenstein via two separate referendums on the topic in 1971 and 1973, though unsuccessful. In addition, the government's term also included the reopening of the Liechtenstein National Museum in 1972.

The 1974 Liechtenstein general election resulted in a win for the Progressive Citizens' Party. As a result, the cabinet was dissolved and succeeded by Walter Kieber in the Walter Kieber cabinet.

== Members ==
Picture	Name	Term	Role	Party
Prime Minister
	Alfred Hilbe	18 March 1970 – 27 March 1974	Foreign affairs; Business; Education; Finance; Construction	Patriotic Union
Deputy Prime Minister
	Walter Kieber	18 March 1970 – 27 March 1974	Interior; Justice; Healthcare; Traffic	Progressive Citizens' Party
Government councillors
	Andreas Vogt	18 March 1970 – 27 March 1974	Social services	Patriotic Union
	Cyrill Büchel	18 March 1970 – April 1971	Culture; Youth	Patriotic Union
	Walter Oehry	April 1971 – 27 March 1974	Culture; Youth	Patriotic Union
	William Hoop	18 March 1970 – 27 March 1974	Agriguculture; Forestry	Progressive Citizens' Party

== See also ==
- Politics of Liechtenstein
