= Third Gerard Batliner cabinet =

Governing body of Liechtenstein (1965–1969)

- Government of Liechtenstein

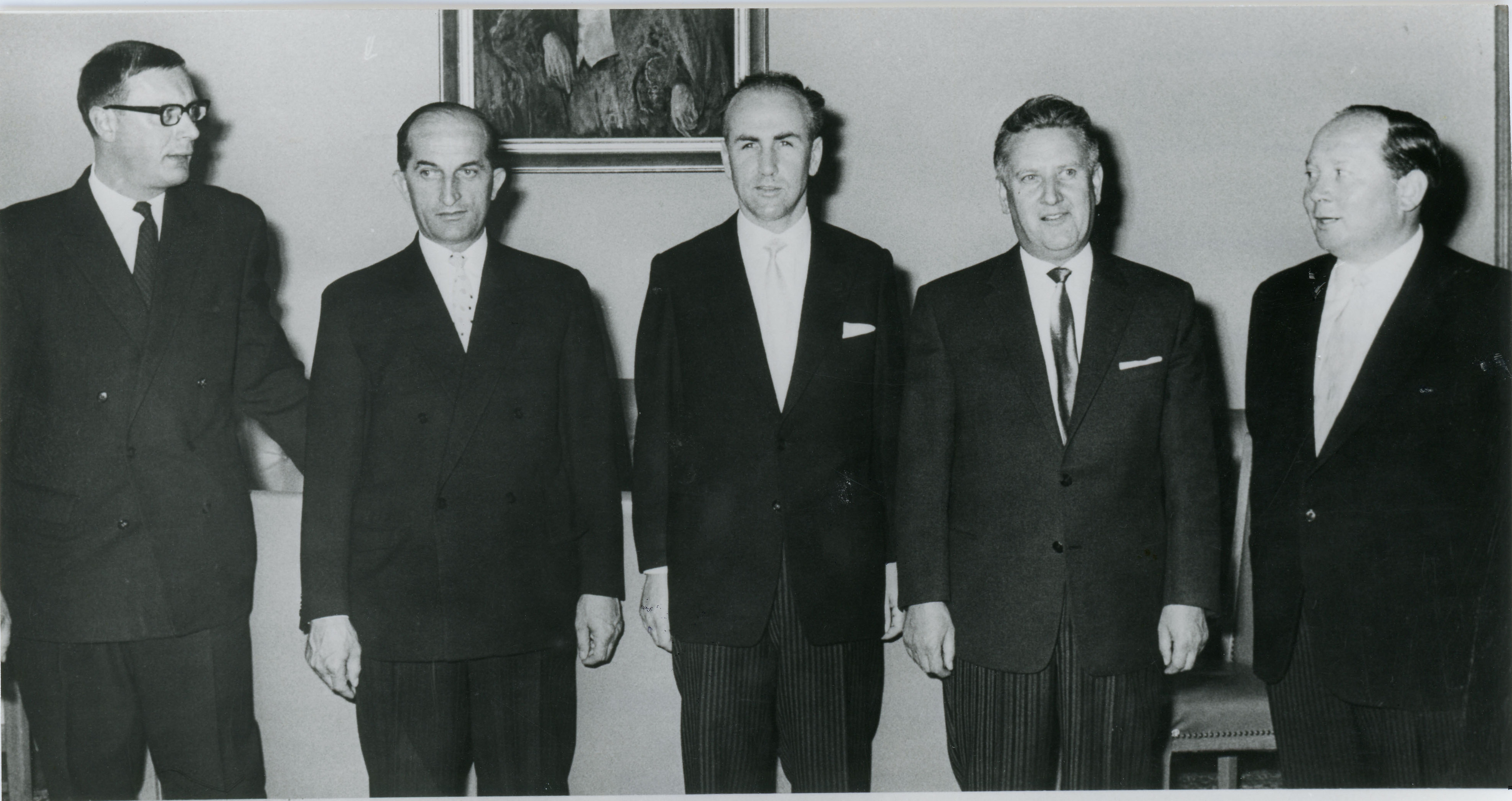
- Batliner's cabinet in 1965
- Date formed: 12 June 1969
- Date dissolved: 18 March 1970

People and organisations
- Head of state: Franz Joseph II
- Head of government: Gerard Batliner
- Deputy head of government: Alfred Hilbe
- Total no. of members: 5
- Member parties: FBP; VU
- Status in legislature: Coalition

History
- Predecessor: Second Gerard Batliner cabinet
- Successor: Alfred Hilbe cabinet

The third Gerard Batliner cabinet was the governing body of Liechtenstein from 12 June 1969 to 18 March 1970. It was appointed by Franz Joseph II and chaired by Gerard Batliner.

== History ==
On 12 June 1969 the Second Gerard Batliner cabinet was dissolved and succeeded with Gerard Batliner continuing as Prime Minister of Liechtenstein.

The 1970 Liechtenstein general election resulted in a win for the Patriotic Union. As such, Batliner was succeeded by Alfred Hilbe in the Alfred Hilbe cabinet.

== Members ==
Picture	Name	Term		Party
Prime Minister
	Gerard Batliner	12 June 1969 – 18 March 1970	Foreign affairs; Finance; Education; Culture	Progressive Citizens' Party
Deputy Prime Minister
	Alfred Hilbe	12 June 1969 – 18 March 1970	Unknown	Patriotic Union
Government councillors
	Gregor Steger	12 June 1969 – 18 March 1970	Construction	Progressive Citizens' Party
	Josef Oehri	12 June 1969 – 18 March 1970	Unknown	Progressive Citizens' Party
	Andreas Vogt	12 June 1969 – 18 March 1970	Social services	Patriotic Union

== See also ==
- Politics of Liechtenstein
