= Andreas Vogt (politician, born 1918) =

Liechtenstein politician (1918–2002)

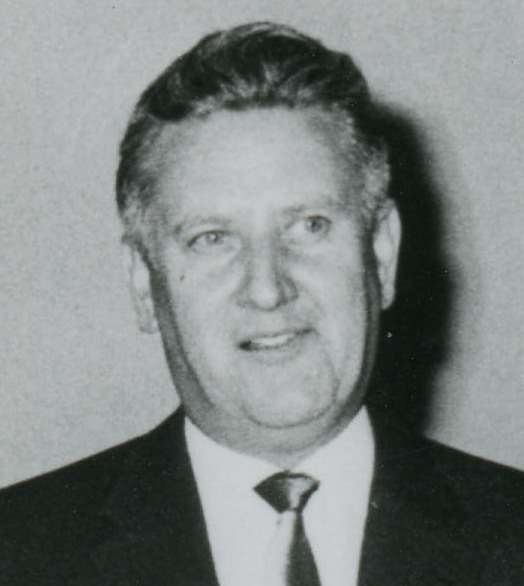
- Vogt in 1965

Government councillor for social affairs
- In office 16 June 1965 – 27 March 1974
- Prime Minister: Gerard Batliner; Alfred Hilbe
- Succeeded by: Hans Gassner

Member of the Landtag of Liechtenstein for Oberland
- In office 14 June 1953 – 25 March 1962

Personal details
- Born: 29 August 1918 Balzers, Liechtenstein
- Died: 23 August 2002 (aged 88) Balzers, Liechtenstein
- Party: Patriotic Union
- Spouse(s): Aloisia Steger (m. 1943; died 1967) Eleonore Tzschentke (m. 1972, divorced) Judith Rieser (m. 1984)
- Children: 3

Andreas Vogt (29 August 1918 – 23 August 2002) was a Liechtensteiner politician who served as a government councillor from 1965 to 1974, in the role of social affairs. He previously served in the Landtag of Liechtenstein from 1953 to 1962.

== Life ==
Vogt was born on 29 August 1918 in Balzers as the son of Georg Vogt and Regina Büchel, as one of four children. He trained as a plumber and heating installer in Azmoos, Buchs and Bern. In the late 1940s, he started his own plumbing and heating business in Balzers, which later moved to Vaduz.

From February to June 1953, he was a deputy member of the Landtag of Liechtenstein as a member of the Patriotic Union, then a full member from June 1953 to 1962. During this time, he was a member of the finance, audit, and state committees. He was again a deputy member from 1962 to 1966. From 1965 to 1974, he was a government councillor with the role of social affairs in the second and third Gerard Batliner cabinet, and also in the Alfred Hilbe cabinet.

He was a co-founder of the Liechtenstein Association for the Elderly and was the honorary president of FC Balzers.

Vogt married Aloisia Steger (30 October 1913 – 29 April 1967) on 1 March 1943, and they had two children together. He then went on to marry Eleonore Tzschentke on 16 September 1972. Finally, he married Judith Rieser on 25 May 1984, and they had another child together. He died on 23 August 2002 in Balzers, aged 88.

== Bibliography ==
- Vogt, Paul (1987). 125 Jahre Landtag (in German). Vaduz: Landtag of the Principality of Liechtenstein.
