= Gerard Batliner cabinet =

Josef Hoop cabinet may refer to:

- First Gerard Batliner cabinet, governing body of Liechtenstein (1962–1965)
- Second Gerard Batliner cabinet, governing body of Liechtenstein (1965–1969)
- Third Gerard Batliner cabinet, governing body of Liechtenstein (1969–1970)

== See also ==
- Gerard Batliner
