= Walter Kieber cabinet =

Governing body of Liechtenstein (1974–1978)

- Government of Liechtenstein

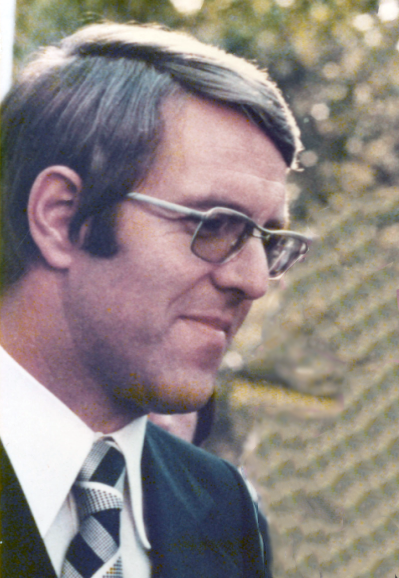
- Date formed: 27 March 1974
- Date dissolved: 26 April 1978

People and organisations
- Head of state: Franz Joseph II
- Head of government: Walter Kieber
- Deputy head of government: Hans Brunhart
- Total no. of members: 5
- Member parties: FBP; VU
- Status in legislature: Coalition

History
- Election: 1974
- Predecessor: Alfred Hilbe cabinet
- Successor: First Hans Brunhart cabinet

The Walter Kieber cabinet was the governing body of Liechtenstein from 27 March 1974 to 26 April 1978. It was appointed by Franz Joseph II and chaired by Walter Kieber.

== History ==
The 1974 Liechtenstein general election resulted in a win for the Progressive Citizens' Party. As a result, the Alfred Hilbe cabinet was dissolved with Walter Kieber succeeding Alfred Hilbe as Prime Minister of Liechtenstein.

In 1975, Kieber was a signatory of the Helsinki Accords to create the Conference for Security and Co-operation in Europe, the precursor of today's OSCE. The government also oversaw Liechtenstein's full ascension into the Council of Europe in 1978.

The 1978 Liechtenstein general election resulted in a win for the Patriotic Union. As a result, the cabinet was dissolved and succeeded by Hans Brunhart as prime minister in the First Hans Brunhart cabinet.

== Members ==
Picture	Name	Term	Role	Party
Prime Minister
	Walter Kieber	27 March 1974 – 26 April 1978	Foreign affairs; Justice; Finance; Construction; Agriculture	Progressive Citizens' Party
Deputy Prime Minister
	Hans Brunhart	27 March 1974 – 26 April 1978	Interior; Education; Healthcare; Traffic	Patriotic Union
Government councillors
	Hans Gassner	27 March 1974 – 26 April 1978	Social services	Progressive Citizens' Party
	Georg Malin	27 March 1974 – 26 April 1978	Culture; Environment	Progressive Citizens' Party
	Walter Oehry	27 March 1974 – 26 April 1978	Sport; Youth	Patriotic Union

== See also ==
- Politics of Liechtenstein
