= Walter Oehry =

Liechtenstein lawyer and politician (1926–2014)

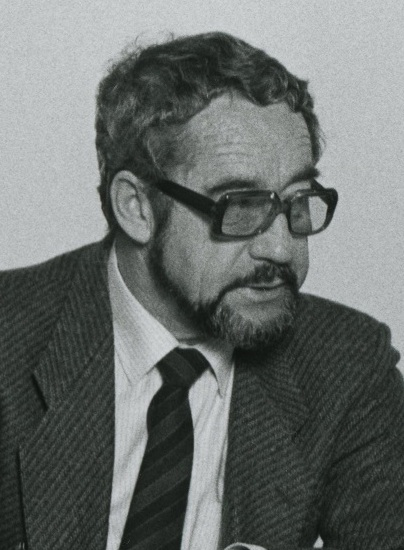
- Oehry in 1985

Government councillor for Agriculture and Forestry
- In office 26 April 1978 – 30 April 1986
- Prime Minister: Hans Brunhart

Government councillor for Culture and Youth
- In office 15 April 1971 – 26 April 1978
- Prime Minister: Alfred Hilbe; Walter Kieber

Member of the Landtag of Liechtenstein for Unterland
- In office 5 March 1989 – 7 February 1993
- In office 3 February 1978 – March 1978
- Succeeded by: Werner Gstöhl

Personal details
- Born: February 18 1926 Mauren, Liechtenstein
- Died: 4 September 2014 (aged 88) Mauren, Liechtenstein
- Party: Patriotic Union
- Spouse(s): Benedikta Harlacher (m. 1956, divorced) Waltraud Rauch (m. 1974)
- Children: 4

Walter Oehry (18 February 1926 – 4 September 2014) was a lawyer, journalist, and politician from Liechtenstein who served as a government councillor from 1971 to 1986. A member of the Patriotic Union (VU), he served as a member of the Landtag of Liechtenstein from 1989 to 1993, having previously briefly done so in 1978.

== Life ==
Oehry was born on 18 February 1926 in Mauren as the son of farmer Valentin Oehry and Erna (née Schierscher) as one of three children. He attended the Liechtensteinisches Gymnasium in Vaduz before studying law in Innsbruck. He worked at the law firm of Ivo Beck in Vaduz from 1955 to 1958, then a self-employed lawyer from 1959 to 1966 and finally head of the legal department at Hilti in Schaan from 1961 to 1991.

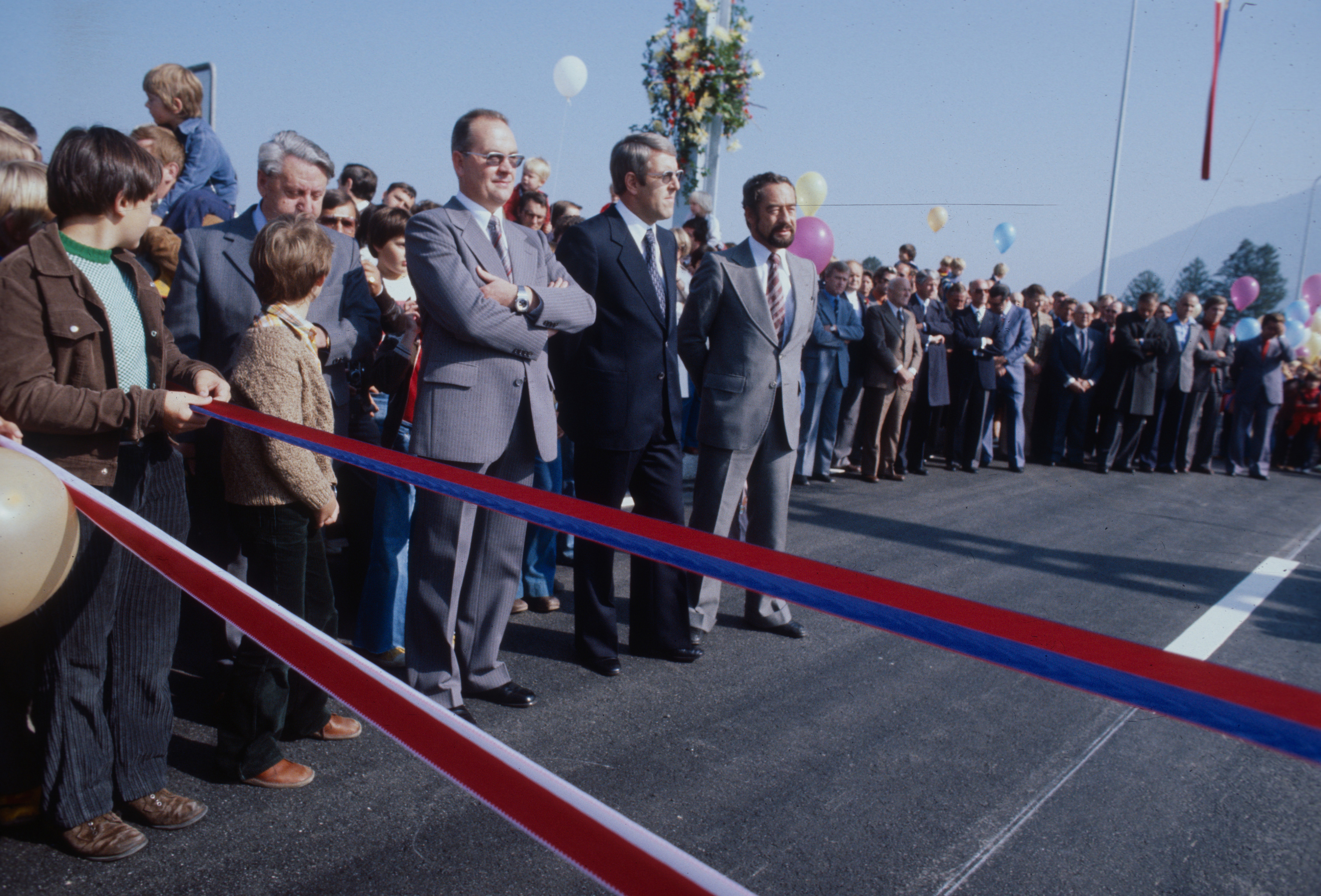
Oehry (front-right) at the opening of the Buchs-Schaan bridge in 1997

He began his political career as serving as the party secretary of the Patriotic Union (VU) from 1957 to 1961, and also as editor of the party's newspaper Liechtensteiner Vaterland from 1958 to 1961. He was a deputy member of the Landtag of Liechtenstein from 1958 to 1962 as a member of the VU. Oehry was elected as a government councillor on 15 April 1971 following the resignation of Cyrill Büchel. Serving under the governments of Alfred Hilbe and Walter Kieber, he held the roles of culture and youth until 1978, and also sport from 1974.

Elected as a full member of the Landtag in the 1978 elections, Oehry resigned his seat in March as he was once again nominated as a government councillor under the government of Hans Brunhart. In this position, he held the roles of agriculture and forestry. He left office in 1986. Ohery was again a member of the Landtag from 1989 to February 1993. During this time, he headed the Liechtenstein delegation to the Parliamentary Assembly of the Council of Europe and the Parliamentary Assembly of the OSCE. He was again a deputy member from February to October 1993.

Oehry was a member of the board of directors at the Liechtenstein Chamber of Commerce from 1958 to 1964, and a judge at the Chamber of Commerce from 1970 to 1971. In addition, he was vice president of the Liechtenstein Hunting Association from 1963 to 1991, president of the Banking Commission from 1987 to 1989 and president of the Switzerland-Liechtenstein Society from 1996 to 1998.

== Personal life ==
Oehry married Benedikta Harlacher on 13 August 1956 and they had three children together, but they divorced at an unspecified time. He then went on to marry Waltraud Rauch on 29 November 1974 and they had one child together. From Mauren, he was a citizen of Gamprin.

He died on 4 September 2014 due to a long illness, aged 88. His funeral was held on 9 September in the Bendern Parish Church.

== Honours ==
- Commander's Cross of the Order of Merit of the Principality of Liechtenstein (1987)

== Bibliography ==
- Vogt, Paul (1987). 125 Jahre Landtag (in German). Vaduz: Landtag of the Principality of Liechtenstein.
