= Hansjörg Frick =

Liechtenstein government councillor (born 1943)

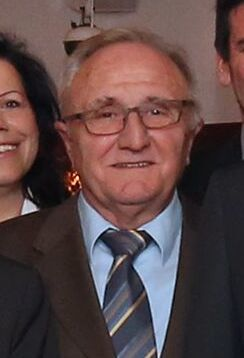
- Frick in 2014

Government councillor for business, social affairs, and healthcare
- In office 5 April 2001 – 21 April 2005
- Prime Minister: Otmar Hasler
- Deputy: Gert Risch

Personal details
- Born: 8 November 1943 (age 82) Schaan, Liechtenstein
- Party: Progressive Citizens' Party
- Spouse: Letitia Casanova (m. 1968)
- Relations: Anton Frommelt (uncle); Noldi Frommelt (cousin)
- Children: 4
- Parent(s): Alexander Frick; Hildegard Kranz

Hansjörg Frick (born 8 November 1943) is a politician from Liechtenstein who served as a government councillor from 2001 to 2005. His roles were business, health and social affairs.

== Life ==
Frick was born on 8 November 1943 as the son of future prime minister Alexander Frick and Hildegard (née Kranz) as one of nine children. He attended secondary school in Vaduz and from 1959 to 1962 he conducted an apprenticeship as a laboratory technician at Emimeta-Amacolor in Schaan and Presta in Eschen. From 1966 to 1998 he worked at Ivoclar in Schaan, and was involved in the founding of various subsidiaries in Sweden, Mexico and the Philippines.

From 5 April 2001 to 21 April 2005 he served as a government councillor in the first Otmar Hasler cabinet as a member of the Progressive Citizens' Party. In this position, his roles were business, healthcare and social affairs.

In 2022, Frick was a leading proponent of the initiative to constitutionally ban casinos in Liechtenstein. However, the subsequent referendum was rejected by voters.

Frick married Letitia Casanova on 17 August 1968 and they have four children together. His cousin Noldi Frommelt served in the Landtag of Liechtenstein.

== Honours ==
- Liechtenstein: Commander's Cross with Star of the Order of Merit of the Principality of Liechtenstein (2003)
