= Georg Malin =

Liechtenstein artist, sculptor and politician (born 1926)

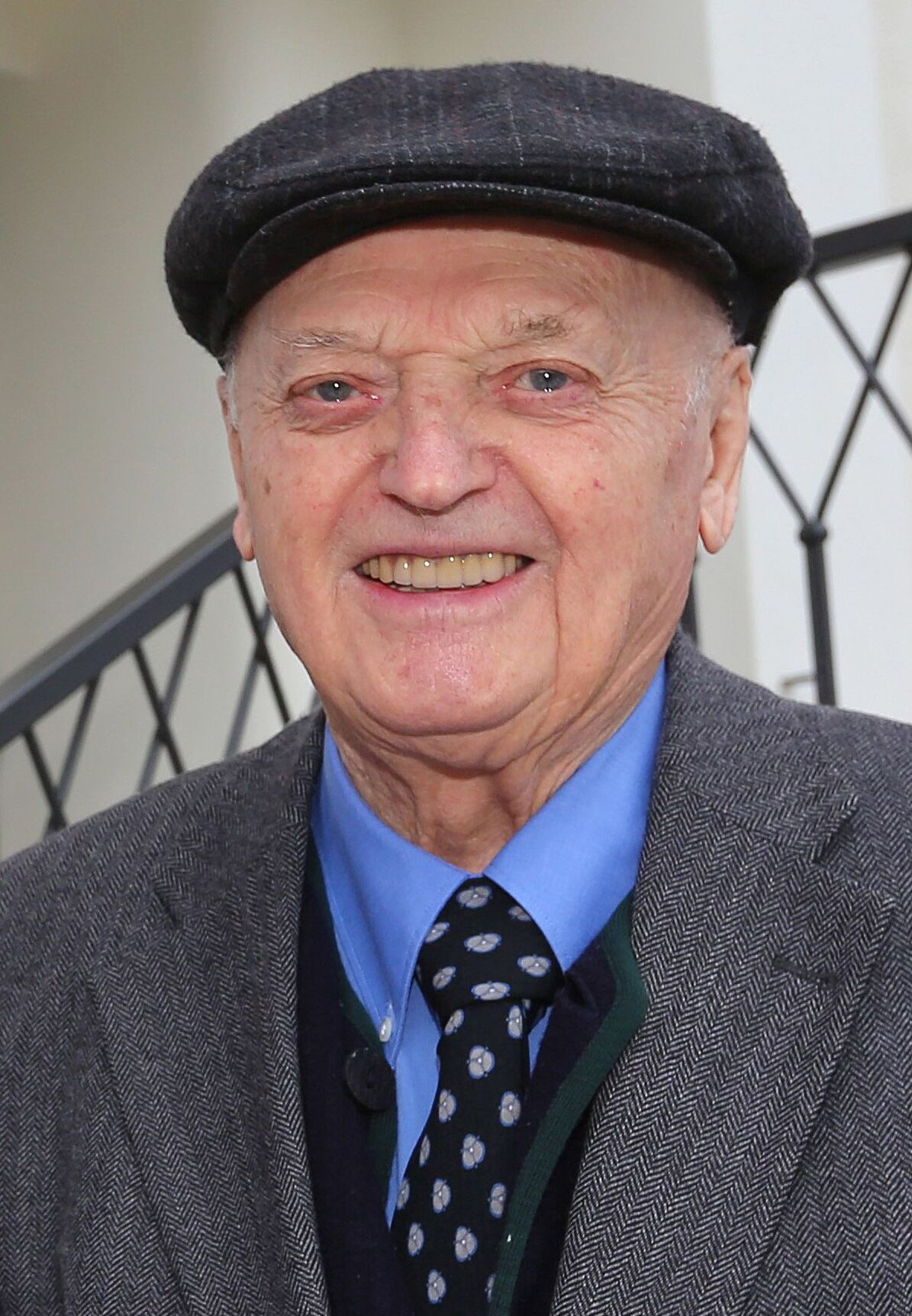
- Malin in 2016

Government Councillor for Culture and Environment
- In office 30 March 1974 – 27 April 1978
- Prime Minister: Walter Kieber

Member of the Landtag of Liechtenstein for Unterland
- In office 6 February 1966 – 3 February 1974

Personal details
- Born: Georg Malin; 8 February 1926 (age 100) Mauren, Liechtenstein
- Party: Progressive Citizens' Party
- Spouse: Berty Ziegler (m. 1956; died 2021)
- Relations: Albert Ziegler (brother-in-law)
- Children: 6

Georg Malin (born 8 February 1926) is an artist, sculptor, historian, and former politician from Liechtenstein who served as a government councillor from 1974 to 1978. A member of the Progressive Citizens' Party (FBP), he previously served as a member of the Landtag of Liechtenstein from 1966 to 1974. His artistry work has included busts and interior designs for churches, along with watercolours and post stamp design. The newspaper Liechtensteiner Vaterland noted him as "one of Liechtenstein's most important artists".

== Early life and artistry career ==
Georg Malin was born on 8 February 1926 in Mauren as the son of plasterer and technician Josef Malin and Hildegard Malin (née Batliner) as one of three children. Spending his early years working as a plasterer, Georg attended the Disentis Abbey before studying history, art history, and philosophy in Zurich and Fribourg; he graduated in 1952 with a Doctor of Philosophy on a thesis about the political history of Liechtenstein from 1800 to 1815. At the same time, he also conducted an apprenticeship with sculptor Alfons Magg in Zurich from 1947 to 1949. He worked as a freelance artist from 1955 until around 2019.

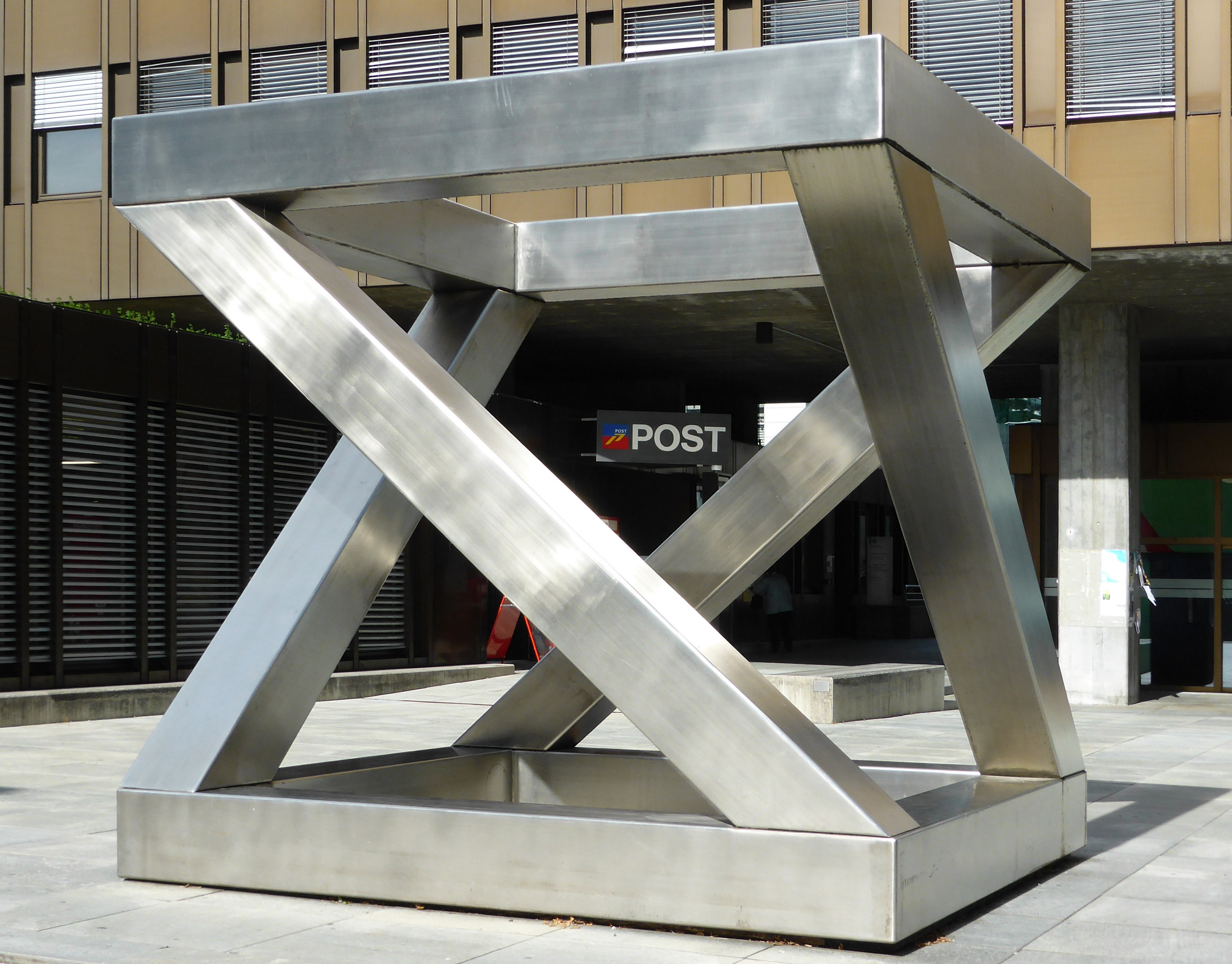
'Squaring the Diagonal' by Malin on display in Vaduz

Malin's works as an artist have included interior and furniture designs, such as for parish churches in Schellenberg, Ruggell, Mauren, Vaduz, Switzerland, and Austria. His works have been noted for its abstractive and constructivist design, which while generally well-received, has also attracted criticism, particularly for his liturgical furniture. His other works have included sculptures of figures such as Peter Kaiser and Franz Joseph II, Prince of Liechtenstein, and desiging a memorial for Johann Baptist Büchel in Balzers. In addition, Malin has created various watercolour paintings.

His works have been exhibited in numerous countries, including in Liechtenstein, Switzerland, France, Italy, Yugoslavia, Argentina, Malta, Germany, Austria, Luxembourg, and Belgium. He co-founded the Kunstmuseum Liechtenstein, and was its first curator from 1968 to 1996; he worked in procuring various art collections for the museum. In 2016, to mark his 90th birthday, Malin was the subject of a joint publication by the Liechtenstein Institute, Historical Association for the Principality of Liechtenstein (HVFL), and Liechtenstein art societies. In addition, the Kunstmuseum presented an exhibition dedicated to his work.

== Historian and political career ==
In January 1951 Malin, alongside Gerard Batliner and Felix Marxer, founded the Liechtenstein Academic Society; Malin served as the society's president from 1954 to 1955 and again in 1966, becoming an honorary member in 2002. He was a board member of the HVFL from 1955 to 1996. As a historian, he has published numerous works on general history, art history, and excavations in Liechtenstein. In particular, Malin directed excavations at the church hill in Bendern from 1969 to 1977 and at the remains of a Roman villa in Nendeln from 1973 to 1975, the latter of which discovered two previously undiscovered buildings.

Malin was a member of the Monument Protection Commission, co-founded the Liechtenstein Art Society in 1975, was president of the Liechtenstein Matura Commission from 1981 to 1988, and finally was president of the Switzerland-Liechtenstein Society from 1984 to 1986.

=== Political career ===
Malin was a member of the Landtag of Liechtenstein from 1966 to 1974 as a member of the Progressive Citizens' Party (FBP). During this time, he was a member of the Liechtenstein Parliamentary Observer Delegation to the Council of Europe; he was a participant in the founding of the Organization for Security and Co-operation in Europe. In addition, he was an advocate for environmental protection.

He was elected as a deputy member of the Landtag in the 1974 elections but instead was appointed as a government councillor under the government of Walter Kieber, in a coalition with the Patriotic Union (VU). In this position, Malin held the roles of environment and culture. As culture minister, he was responsible for implementing a monument protection law. He was a candidate for government in the 1978 elections; however, the VU won the election, and he subsequently resigned in April.

== Personal life ==
Malin married Berty Ziegler (6 April 1926 – 21 January 2021), the sister of Swiss theologian Albert Ziegler, on 14 July 1956; they had six children.
