= Noldi Frommelt =

Liechtenstein carpenter and politician (born 1931)

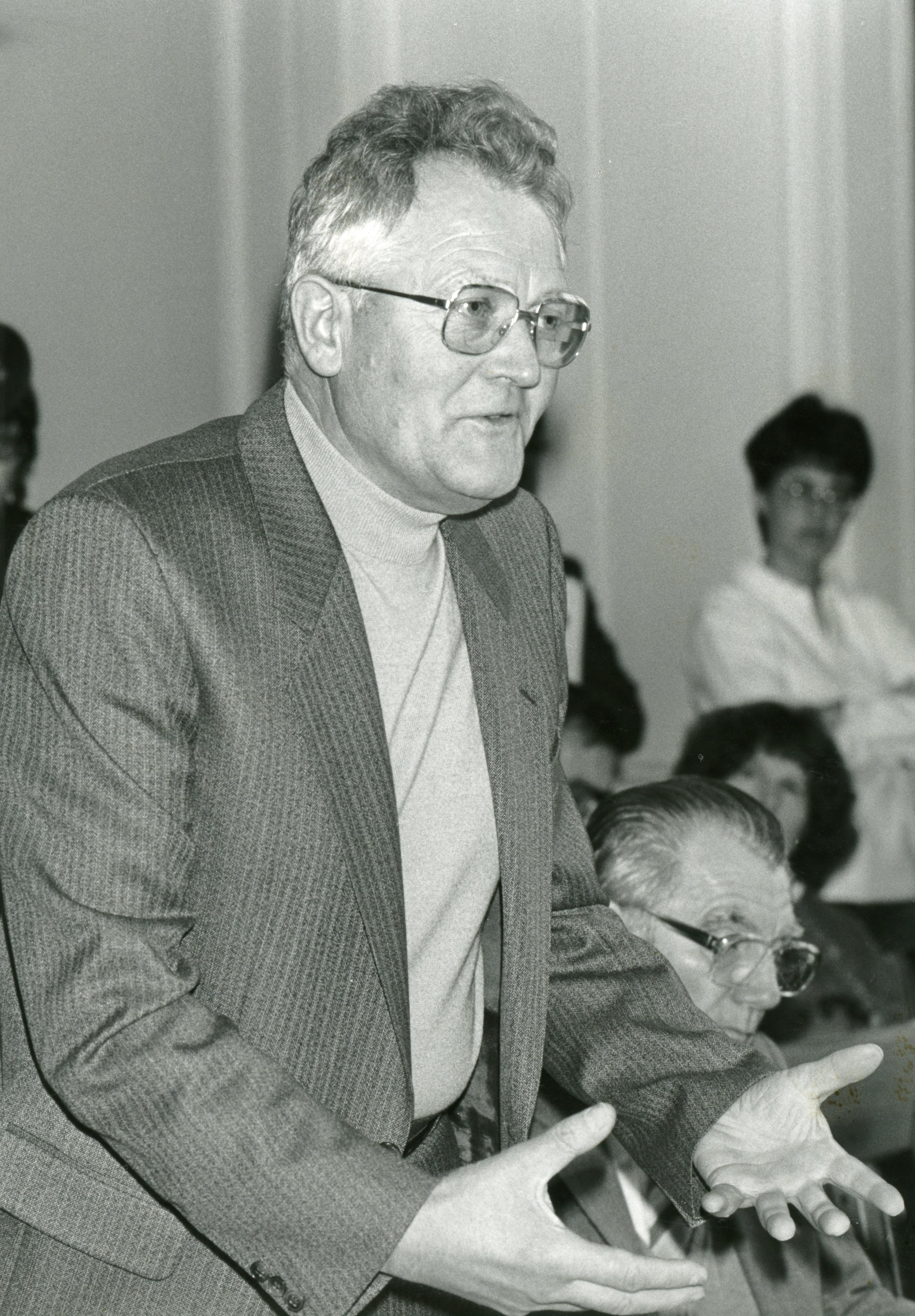
- Frommelt in 1984

Member of the Landtag of Liechtenstein for Oberland
- In office 3 February 1974 – 2 February 1986

Personal details
- Born: 16 August 1931 Schaan, Liechtenstein
- Died: 17 November 2019 (aged 88) Grabs, Switzerland
- Party: Progressive Citizens' Party
- Spouse: Johanna Schropp (m. 1957; died 1991)
- Relations: Anton Frommelt (uncle); Alexander Frick (uncle); Hansjörg Frick (cousin)
- Children: 5

Noldi Frommelt (16 August 1931 – 17 November 2019), also known as Arnold, was a carpenter and politician from Liechtenstein who served in the Landtag of Liechtenstein from 1974 to 1986.

== Life ==
Frommelt was born on 16 August 1931 in Schaan as the son of carpenter Christoph Frommelt and Rosa Frick as one of six children. He is the nephew of Anton Frommelt and Alexander Frick. He attended secondary school in Vaduz. In 1946 he joined his father's carpentry business in Schaan, which he then ran from 1962 to 2005.

From 1974 to 1986 he was a member of the Landtag of Liechtenstein as a member of the Progressive Citizens' Party. During this time, he was a member of the finance and state committees. He was a co-founder and the chairman of the Liechtenstein Mountain Rescue Service.

During the 1992 Liechtenstein constitutional crisis Frommelt, among other notable politicians, formed the Nonpartisan Committee for Monarchy and Democracy and called for a demonstration against Hans-Adam II's threatened dissolution of the Landtag due to disagreements regarding the date of a referendum to Liechtenstein's accession to the European Economic Area. As a result, approximately 2,000 people demonstrated in front of the government house in Vaduz. Ultimately, a compromise was reached between the prince and government.

In the run-up to the 2003 Liechtenstein constitutional referendum, Frommelt alongside other former members of the Landtag, opposed the proposed changes by the prince.

Frommelt married Johanna Schropp (16 February 1931 – 29 April 1991) on 28 September 1957 and they had five children together. He died on 17 November 2019, aged 88.

== Bibliography ==
- Vogt, Paul (1987). 125 Jahre Landtag (in German). Vaduz: Landtag of the Principality of Liechtenstein.
