= Second Gerard Batliner cabinet =

Governing body of Liechtenstein (1965–1969)

- Government of Liechtenstein

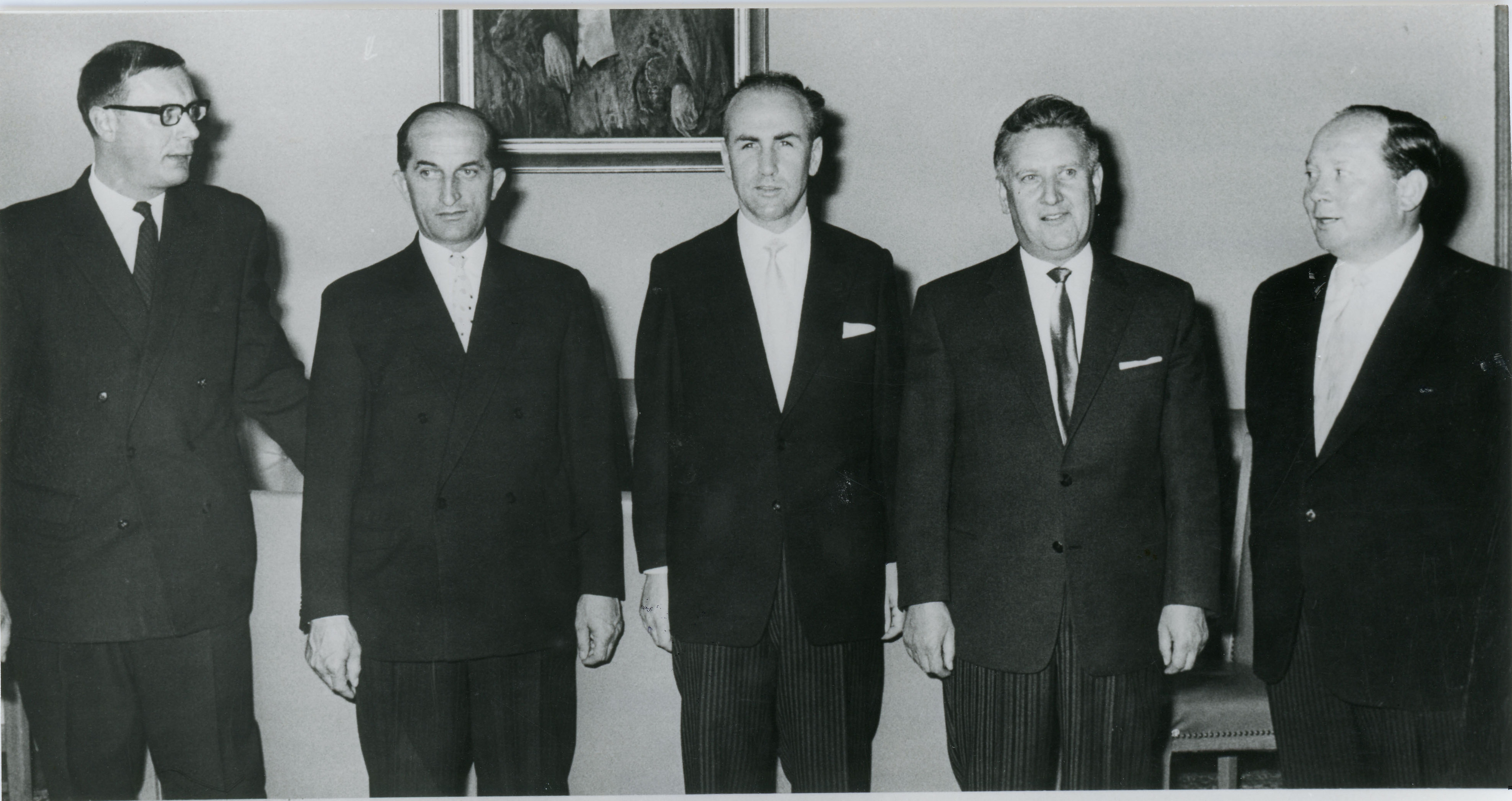
- Batliner's cabinet in 1965
- Date formed: 16 June 1965
- Date dissolved: 12 June 1969

People and organisations
- Head of state: Franz Joseph II
- Head of government: Gerard Batliner
- Deputy head of government: Alfred Hilbe
- Total no. of members: 5
- Member parties: FBP; VU
- Status in legislature: Coalition

History
- Election: 1966
- Predecessor: First Gerard Batliner cabinet
- Successor: Third Gerard Batliner cabinet

The second Gerard Batliner cabinet was the governing body of Liechtenstein from 16 June 1965 to 12 June 1969. It was appointed by Franz Joseph II and chaired by Gerard Batliner.

== History ==
On 3 February 1965, a constitutional amendment took place that increased the required number of government councilors in the Liechtenstein cabinet from three to five, including making the deputy prime minister a full member of government. As a result, the First Gerard Batliner cabinet was succeeded with Gerard Batliner continuing as Prime Minister of Liechtenstein.

The government's term in office was characterized by efforts to expand Liechtenstein's foreign affairs, particularly towards the country's ascension to the Council of Europe. It also included the founding of the Liechtenstein Development Service and special education aid 1965. The cabinet continued after the 1966 Liechtenstein general election.

The cabinet was dissolved on 12 June 1969 and succeeded by the Third Gerard Batliner cabinet.

== Members ==
Picture	Name	Term	Role	Party
Prime Minister
	Gerard Batliner	16 June 1965 – 12 June 1969	Foreign affairs; Finance; Education; Culture	Progressive Citizens' Party
Deputy Prime Minister
	Alfred Hilbe	16 June 1965 – 12 June 1969	Unknown	Patriotic Union
Government councillors
	Gregor Steger	16 June 1965 – 12 June 1969	Construction	Progressive Citizens' Party
	Josef Oehri	16 June 1965 – 12 June 1969	Unknown	Progressive Citizens' Party
	Andreas Vogt	16 June 1965 – 12 June 1969	Social services	Patriotic Union

== See also ==
- Politics of Liechtenstein
