= 1981 Liechtenstein constitutional referendum =

- 10 May 1981
- Referendum on amending article 46 of the constitution

Results
Choice	Votes	%
Yes	2,217	48.15%
No	2,387	51.85%
Valid votes	4,604	99.70%
Invalid or blank votes	14	0.30%
Total votes	4,618	100.00%
Registered voters/turnout	5,151	89.65%

A constitutional referendum was held in Liechtenstein on 10 May 1981. Voters were asked whether they approved of amending article 46, which covered the number of seats in the Landtag, its membership and the electoral system. The proposal, which had been narrowly rejected in a 1975 referendum, was rejected by 52.9% of voters.

== Results ==
Choice	Votes	%
For	2,217	47.1
Against	2,387	52.9
Invalid/blank votes	104	–
Total	4,618	100
Registered voters/turnout	5,151	89.7
Source: Nohlen & Stöver
