= Armin Meier (politician) =

Liechtenstein politician (1941–1999)

Member of the Landtag of Liechtenstein for Unterland
- In office 3 February 1978 – 2 February 1986

Personal details
- Born: 3 May 1941 Gamprin, Liechtenstein
- Died: 20 March 1999 (aged 57) Feldkirch, Austria
- Party: Progressive Citizens' Party
- Parent(s): Egon Meier; Anna Näscher

Armin Meier (3 May 1941 – 20 March 1999) was a politician from Liechtenstein who served in the Landtag of Liechtenstein from 1978 to 1986.

== Life ==
Meier was born on 3 May 1941 in Gamprin as the son of future mayor of Mauren Egon Meier and Berta (née) Kaiser as one of six children. He attended high school in Appenzell Innerrhoden. He then went on to study special education and school in school psychology in Freiburg im Breisgau. From 1969 to 1998 he was the director of the director of the special education centre in Schaan. During this time, he played a major role in its expansion.

From 1978 to 1986 Meier was a member of the Landtag of Liechtenstein as a member of the Progressive Citizens' Party (FBP), and he was the Vice president of the Landtag of Liechtenstein from 1982 to 1986. During this time, he was a member of the finance, state, and foreign affairs committee.

Meier married Hildegard Marxer on 11 July 1974 and they had two children together. He lived in Mauren. He died of an illness on 20 March 1999 in Feldkirch, aged 57.

== Honours ==
- Liechtenstein: Commander's Cross of the Order of Merit of the Principality of Liechtenstein (1981)

== Bibliography ==
- Vogt, Paul (1987). 125 Jahre Landtag (in German). Vaduz: Landtag of the Principality of Liechtenstein.
