= Werner Gstöhl =

Liechtenstein banker and politician (1936–2024)

Member of the Landtag of Liechtenstein for Unterland
- In office March 1978 – 7 February 1982
- Preceded by: Walter Oehry
- In office 3 February 1974 – 3 February 1978

Personal details
- Born: 3 November 1936 Eschen, Liechtenstein
- Died: 22 October 2024 (aged 87) Eschen, Liechtenstein
- Party: Patriotic Union
- Spouse: Marlies Hartmann (m. 1965; died 2015)
- Children: 4

Werner Hubert Gstöhl (3 November 1936 – 22 October 2024) was a banker, winemaker and politician from Liechtenstein who served in the Landtag of Liechtenstein from 1974 to 1978, and again from 1978 to 1982.

== Life ==
Gstöhl was born on 3 November 1936 in Eschen as the son of farmer Josef Gstöhl and Berta, née Fehr as one of four children. He attended secondary school in Eschen before attending business school in Estavayer-le-Lac. He then conducted a commercial apprenticeship at the National Bank of Liechtenstein from 1954 to 1957.

He worked at the National Bank of Liechtenstein from 1954 to 1963, briefly at Alusuisse in Zurich from 1963 to 1964 and again at the national bank from 1964 to 1979. From 1979, he worked as an independent trustee. He was a member of the board of directors of the national bank from 1996 to 2002.

Gstöhl was a member of the Eschen municipal council from 1969 to 1972 as a member of the Patriotic Union. He was a member of the Landtag of Liechtenstein from 1974 to 1978. He was elected as a deputy member in 1978, but shortly afterwards succeeded Walter Oehry as a full member following his resignation to become a government councillor. He was also briefly the Landtag's secretary.

He was again a member of the Eschen municipal council from 1983 to 1987, and also deputy mayor of the municipality during this time. He was a judge at the Liechtenstein Administrative Appeals Board from 1996 to 2002.

He started as an amateur winemaker in 1983, and founded the Castellum in Eschen winery the same year. It was taken over by his son in 1991, which was expanded into the largest winery in Liechtenstein until its downsizing in 2024.

Gstöhl married Marlies Hartmann (9 October 1943 – 2 November 2015) on 9 October 1965 and they had four children together. He died on 22 October 2024, aged 87.

== Honours ==
- Holy See: Knight of the Order of the Holy Sepulchre

== Bibliography ==
- Vogt, Paul (1987). 125 Jahre Landtag (in German). Vaduz: Landtag of the Principality of Liechtenstein.
