= Wolfgang Feger =

Liechtenstein politician (1938–1980)

Member of the Landtag of Liechtenstein for Oberland
- In office 3 February 1978 – 16 November 1980
- Succeeded by: Ludwig Seger

Personal details
- Born: 25 August 1938 Vaduz, Liechtenstein
- Died: 16 November 1980 (aged 42) St. Gallen, Switzerland
- Party: Patriotic Union
- Spouse: Brigitte Büchel (m. 1972)
- Relations: Guido Feger (uncle); Alfons Feger (great-uncle)
- Children: 5

Wolfgang Feger (25 August 1938 – 16 November 1980) was a politician from Liechtenstein who served in the Landtag of Liechtenstein from 1978 until his death in 1980.

He was a member of the national tax commission from 1968 to 1978. He was a member of the board of directors at VP Bank from 1972 to 1980, and its president from 1977 to 1980, which he took over from his uncle Guido Feger. He was a deputy member of the Landtag from 1970 to 1978. Feger published articles for the Historical Association for the Principality of Liechtenstein.

He died of cancer on 16 November 1980, aged 42. He was from Triesen, but later moved to Schaan.

== Bibliography ==
- Vogt, Paul (1987). 125 Jahre Landtag (in German). Vaduz: Landtag of the Principality of Liechtenstein.
