= 1975 Liechtenstein referendums =

Reducing the amount of money distributed to local councils
For	43.17%
Against	56.83%

Amending article 46 of the constitution
For	49.72%
Against	50.28%

Two referendums were held in Liechtenstein during 1975. The first was held on 2 March on reducing the amount of money distributed to local councils (which had been approved by a 1970 referendum) and was rejected by 56.8% of voters. The second was held on 30 November on amending article 46 of the constitution (concerning elections and composition of the Landtag) and was rejected by 50.3% of voters, a margin of 22 votes.

== Results ==
=== Reducing the amount of money distributed to local authorities ===
Choice	Votes	%
For	1,565	43.2
Against	2,060	56.8
Invalid/blank votes	130	–
Total	3,755	100
Registered voters/turnout	4,650	80.7
Source: Nohlen & Stöver

=== Amendment of Article 46 of the constitution ===
Choice	Votes	%
For	1,965	49.7
Against	1,987	50.3
Invalid/blank votes	126	–
Total	4,078	100
Registered voters/turnout	4,717	86.3
Source: Nohlen & Stöver
