= 1970 Liechtenstein tax adjustment referendum =

- 1 March 1970

Tax adjustment proposal
For	67.6%
Against	32.4%

Landtag counterproposal
For	33.2%
Against	66.8%

A double referendum on tax adjustment was held in Liechtenstein on 1 March 1970. Voters were asked whether they approved of a tax adjustment for local government and a counterproposal from the Landtag. The first proposal was approved by 67.6% of voters, whilst the Landtag counterproposal was rejected by 66.8% of voters.

== Results ==
=== Tax adjustment proposal ===
Choice	Votes	%
For	2,181	67.6
Against	1,045	32.4
Invalid/blank votes	192	–
Total	3,418	100
Registered voters/turnout	4,312	79.3
Source: Nohlen & Stöver

=== Landtag counterproposal ===
Choice	Votes	%
For	974	33.2
Against	1,956	66.8
Invalid/blank votes	488	–
Total	3,418	100
Registered voters/turnout	4,312	79.3
Source: Nohlen & Stöver
