= Josef Biedermann =

Liechtenstein teacher and politician (born 1944)

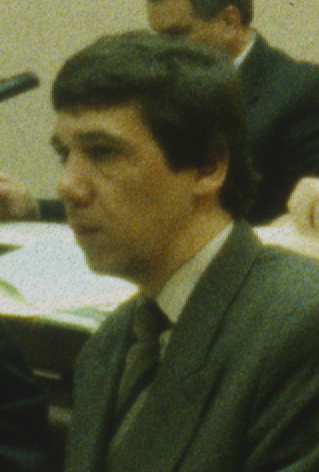
- Biedermann in 1991

Member of the Landtag of Liechtenstein for Oberland
- In office 3 February 1978 – 7 February 1993

President of the Progressive Citizens' Party
- In office 1986–1987
- Preceded by: Herbert Batliner
- Succeeded by: Emanuel Vogt

Personal details
- Born: 26 November 1944 (age 81) Feldkirch, Austria
- Party: Progressive Citizens' Party
- Spouse: Josephine Schöb (m. 1967)
- Relations: Franz Biedermann (brother); Katrin Eggenberger (niece)
- Children: 3

Josef Biedermann (born 26 November 1944) is a former teacher and politician from Liechtenstein who served in the Landtag of Liechtenstein from 1978 to 1993. A member of the Progressive Citizens' Party (FBP), he served as the party's president from 1986 to 1987 and was the vice president of the Landtag from 1989 to 1993.

== Life ==
Biedermann was born on 26 November 1944 in Feldkirch as the son of teacher Franz Biedermann and Anny (née Manahl) as one of eleven children. He attended gymnasiums in Feldkirch then Vaduz before studying secondary education and biology in Freiburg im Breisgau. From 1970 to 2008 he worked as a teacher of biology, chemistry, and biology at the Liechtensteinisches Gymnasium, and was also its rector from 1987. Biedermann was a performer of cabaret from 1964 to 1970.

He was elected as a deputy member of the Landtag of Liechtenstein in the 1974 elections as a member of the Progressive Citizens' Party (FBP), and then as a full member in the 1978 elections. During his time in the Landtag, he was a member of the body's finance, audit, foreign affairs, and provincial committees. Following the FBP's electoral defeat in the 1986 elections, Biedermann served as acting president of the party from 1986 to 1987. In the 1989 elections, he was the FBP's candidate for president of the Landtag; he was vice president of the Landtag from 1989 to 1993.

Biedermann was the FBP's candidate for Prime Minister of Liechtenstein in the October 1993 elections. Originally intended to assume the position in the event of his removal as prime minister, he subsequently became the party nomination for the position once early elections had been called. The party lost the election to the Patriotic Union (VU), and Biedermann resigned as a government candidate. He was a member of the Planken municipal council from 2011 to 2019, and also the deputy mayor of the municipality.

As of 2011, Biedermann has been a member of presidium at the International Commission for the Protection of the Alps (CIPRA) since 1992. As of 2020, he has been the president Botanical-Zoological Society of Liechtenstein-Sargans-Werdenberg since 1995, and also president of the board of directors Adult Education Stein-Egerta from 1998 to 2016.

== Personal life ==
Biedermann married Josephine "Josy" Schöb on 6 April 1967 and they have three children together. Originally from Schellenberg, he has been from Planken since 1997. His brother Franz Biedermann competed in the men's decathlon at the 1968 Summer Olympics, and his niece Katrin Eggenberger served as a government councillor from 2019 to 2021.
