= Karlheinz Ritter =

President of the Landtag of Liechtenstein (1970–1974; 1978–1993)

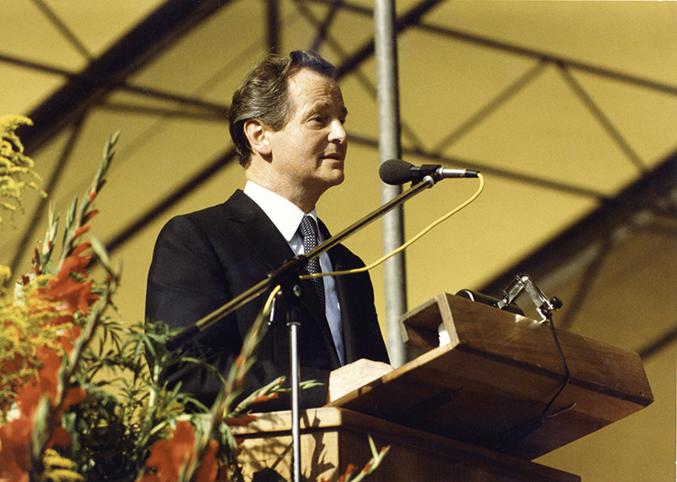
- Ritter in 1986

President of the Landtag of Liechtenstein
- In office 21 April 1978 – 12 May 1993
- Vice President: Josef Biedermann (1989–1993); Josef Büchel (1986–1989); Armin Meier (1982–1986); Gerard Batliner (1978–1982)
- Preceded by: Gerard Batliner
- Succeeded by: Ernst Walch
- In office 13 March 1970 – 27 March 1974
- Vice President: Alexander Frick
- Preceded by: Alexander Frick
- Succeeded by: Gerard Batliner

Personal details
- Born: 1 July 1929 Vaduz, Liechtenstein
- Died: 18 July 2008 (aged 79) Vaduz, Liechtenstein
- Party: Patriotic Union
- Spouse: Erika Kranz (m. 1951)
- Children: 4
- Parent(s): Alois Ritter; Isabella Gassner

Karlheinz Ritter (1 July 1929 – 18 July 2008) was a lawyer and politician from Liechtenstein who served as the President of the Landtag of Liechtenstein from 1970 to 1974 and again from 1978 to 1993.

== Life ==
Ritter was born on 1 July 1929 in Vaduz as the son of lawyer Alois Ritter and Isabella (née Gassner) as one of four children. He attended secondary school in St. Gallen before studying law in Bern, where he received a doctorate in 1950.

In 1958, Ritter joined his father's law firm, Ritter & Beck Rechtsanwälte, which he took over upon his death in 1966. From 1966 to 1993 he was a member of the Landtag of Liechtenstein as a member of the Patriotic Union. He was twice the President of the Landtag of Liechtenstein, from 13 March 1970 to 27 March 1974 and again from 21 April 1978 to 12 May 1993. He was the vice president of the Landtag from 1974 to 1978.

From 1962 to 1969, he was a member Liechtenstein state board of education from 1962 and 1969 and also a judge. In 1981, he was appointed Princely Justice Counsellor by Franz Joseph II.

Ritter married Erika Kranz (1926–2014) on 24 November 1951 and they had four children together. He died of an illness on 18 July 2008, aged 79.

== Honours ==
- Liechtenstein: Grand Cross of the Order of Merit of the Principality of Liechtenstein (1937)

== Bibliography ==
- Vogt, Paul (1987). 125 Jahre Landtag (in German). Vaduz: Landtag of the Principality of Liechtenstein.
