= Cyrill Büchel =

Liechtenstein politician (1929–2005)

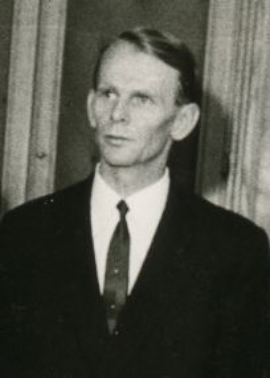
- Büchel in 1970

Government councillor for Culture and Youth
- In office 18 March 1970 – April 1971
- Prime Minister: Alfred Hilbe
- Succeeded by: Walter Oehry

Member of the Landtag of Liechtenstein for Unterland
- In office 6 February 1966 – 3 February 1978

Personal details
- Born: 7 March 1929 Gamprin, Liechtenstein
- Died: 16 May 2005 (aged 76) Vaduz, Liechtenstein
- Party: Patriotic Union
- Spouse: Alice Schreiber (m. 1960)
- Children: 3

Cyrill Büchel (7 March 1929 – 16 May 2005) was a politician from Liechtenstein who served in the Landtag of Liechtenstein from 1966 to 1978. He also served as a government councillor from 1970 to 1971, with the roles of culture and youth.

He attended secondary school in Eschen. From 1945 to 1990 he worked at Hilcona in Schaan as the head purchasing and he was a member of the board of directors at the National Bank of Liechtenstein from 1959 to 1966. He was vice president of the Liechtenstein Employees' Association from 1956 to 1960.

== Bibliography ==
- Vogt, Paul (1987). 125 Jahre Landtag (in German). Vaduz: Landtag of the Principality of Liechtenstein.
