= Peter Marxer =

Liechtensteiner lawyer and politician (1933–2016)

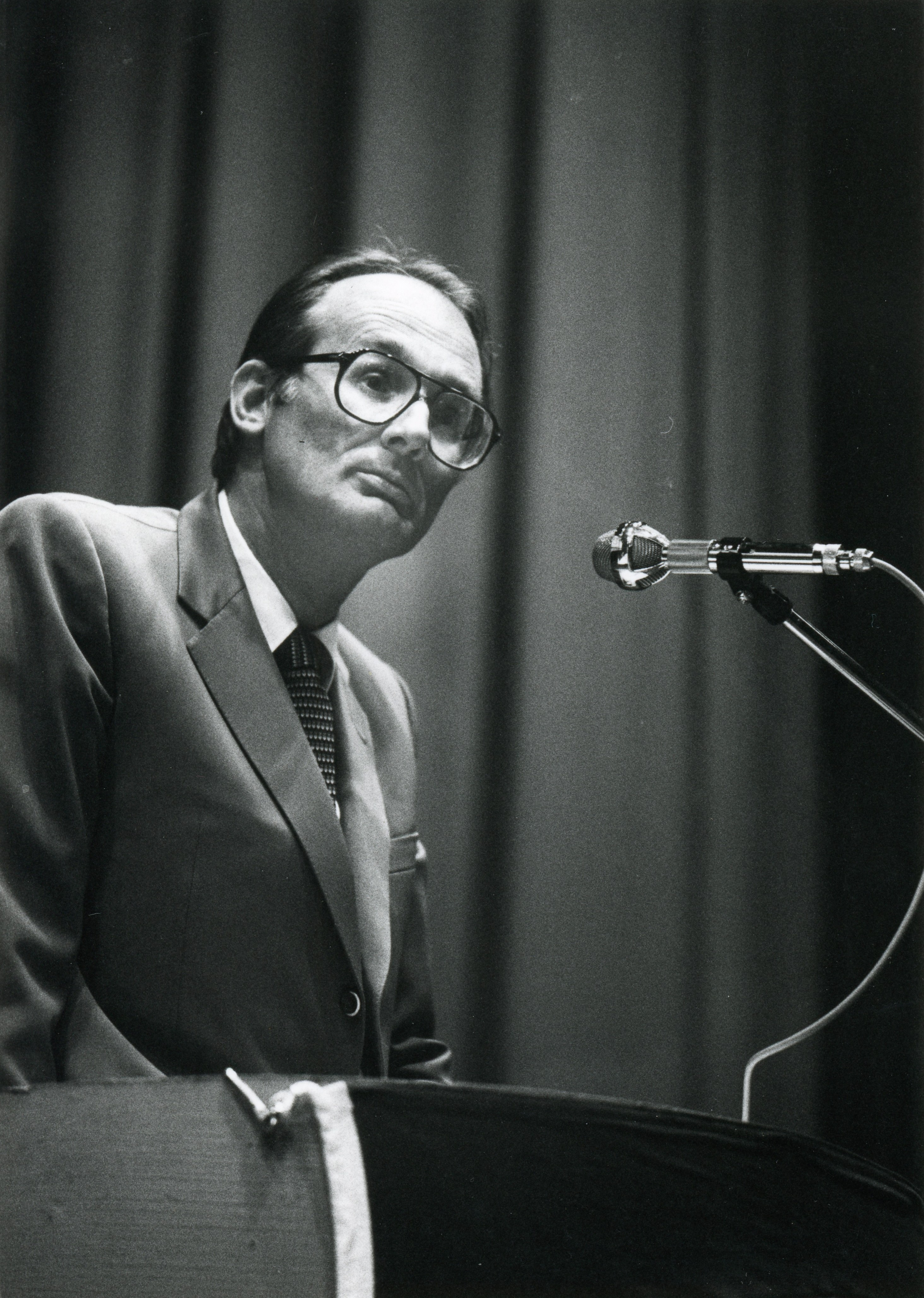
- Marxer in 1975

Member of the Landtag of Liechtenstein for Oberland
- In office 6 February 1966 – 7 February 1982

President of the Progressive Citizens' Party
- In office 1970–1982
- Preceded by: Richard Meier
- Succeeded by: Herbert Batliner

Personal details
- Born: 11 May 1933 Vaduz, Liechtenstein
- Died: 30 May 2016 (aged 83) Vaduz, Liechtenstein
- Party: Progressive Citizens' Party
- Spouse: Ingeborg Huber (m. 1958, divorced) Renate Waldhuber (m. 1975)
- Children: 6
- Parent(s): Ludwig Marxer; Maria nee Öhri

Peter Marxer (11 May 1933 – 30 May 2016) was an advocate and political figure from Liechtenstein who served in the Landtag of Liechtenstein from 1966 to 1982. He was also the president of the Progressive Citizens' Party from 1970 to 1982 and oversaw the law firm Marxer & Partner Rechtsanwälte from 1962 until his death.

== Life ==
Marxer was born on 11 May 1933 in Vaduz to lawyer and then deputy prime minister Ludwig Marxer and Maria Öhri as one of three children. He attended secondary school in Vaduz and Sarnen from 1944 to 1953. He then went on to study law in the University of Innsbruck from 1953, where he received a doctorate in 1957.

In 1959, Marxer joined his father's law firm, Marxer & Partner Rechtsanwälte. Upon his death in 1962 he along with partners Adulf Peter Goop and Walter Kieber took over the firm. They oversaw the expansion of the firm into the largest law firm Liechtenstein. From 1963 to 1990, Marxer was a member of the board of directors LGT Group. In 1993 the law firm became a partner of Centrum Bank AG and Marxer served as the chairman of the board of directors until 2011.

Marxer entered politics as a member of the Progressive Citizens' Party, where he founded and served of the first president of the party's youth wing, Young FBP, from 1963 to 1970. He was a member of the Landtag of Liechtenstein from 1966 to 1982 and was also the party's spokesman in the Landtag from 1967 to 1982. During this time, Marxer spearheaded the creation of the foreign policy commission and the state committee in the Landtag. From 1970 to 1982 he served as the president of the Progressive Citizens' Party, and then became the honorary president from 1982 until his death.

He served as the president of the Liechtensteiner Volksblatt press association from 1984 to 1992. He was also an honorary member of the Balzers men's choir from 1969, the Harmoniemusik Eschen from 1974, Choral Society Eschen from 1982 and finally the Liechtenstein Musical Company from 2005.

Though he had largely ceased the running of day-to-day operations of Marxer & Partner by the 1990s, he remained the official head of the firm until his death. He died on 30 May 2016 in Vaduz, aged 83.

== Personal life ==
Marxer married Ingeborg Huber on 28 October 1958 and they had four children together, but got divorced at an unspecified time. He then married Renate Waldhuber on 17 January 1975 and had another two children. His sons Peter and Florian also work as lawyers.

== See also ==
- Marxer & Partner Rechtsanwälte
- Politics of Liechtenstein
