= Walter Kieber =

Prime Minister of Liechtenstein from 1974 to 1978

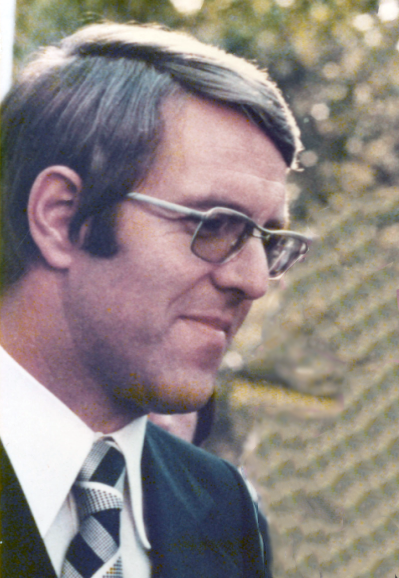
- Kieber in August 1975

Prime Minister of Liechtenstein
- In office 27 March 1974 – 26 April 1978
- Monarch: Franz Joseph II
- Deputy: Hans Brunhart
- Preceded by: Alfred Hilbe
- Succeeded by: Hans Brunhart

Deputy Prime Minister of Liechtenstein
- In office 26 April 1978 – 1 July 1980
- Monarch: Franz Joseph II
- Prime Minister: Hans Brunhart
- Preceded by: Hans Brunhart
- Succeeded by: Hilmar Ospelt
- In office 18 March 1970 – 27 March 1974
- Monarch: Franz Joseph II
- Prime Minister: Alfred Hilbe
- Preceded by: Alfred Hilbe
- Succeeded by: Hans Brunhart

Personal details
- Born: 20 February 1931 Feldkirch, Austria
- Died: 21 June 2014 (aged 83) Vaduz, Liechtenstein
- Party: Progressive Citizens' Party
- Spouse: Selma Ritter (m. 1959)
- Children: 2

Walter Kieber (German pronunciation: [ˈvaltɐ ˈkiːbɐ]; 20 February 1931 – 21 June 2014) was a lawyer and politician from Liechtenstein who served as Prime Minister of Liechtenstein from 1974 to 1978. He also served as Deputy Prime Minister of Liechtenstein from 1970 to 1974 and again from 1978 to 1980.

== Early life and career ==
Kieber was born on 20 February 1931 in Feldkirch as the son of Austrian Federal Railways official Alfons Kieber Elisabeth Brandauer. He attended school in Bregenz before from 1950 he studied law at the University of Innsbruck, where he graduated with a doctorate in 1954.

In 1955 Kieber joined the law firm Marxer & Partner Rechtsanwälte as a partner run by Ludwig Marxer. Upon Marxer's death in 1962, Kieber, partner Adulf Peter Goop, and Peter Marxer took over the firm and oversaw its expansion into the largest in Liechtenstein.

== Prime Minister of Liechtenstein ==
Kieber was the Deputy Prime Minister of Liechtenstein from 18 March 1970 to 27 March 1974 under the government of Alfred Hilbe. Kieber was the Prime Minister of Liechtenstein, serving from 27 March 1974 to 26 April 1978. The 1974 Liechtenstein general election resulted in a win for the Progressive Citizens' Party and Kieber was appointed prime minister.

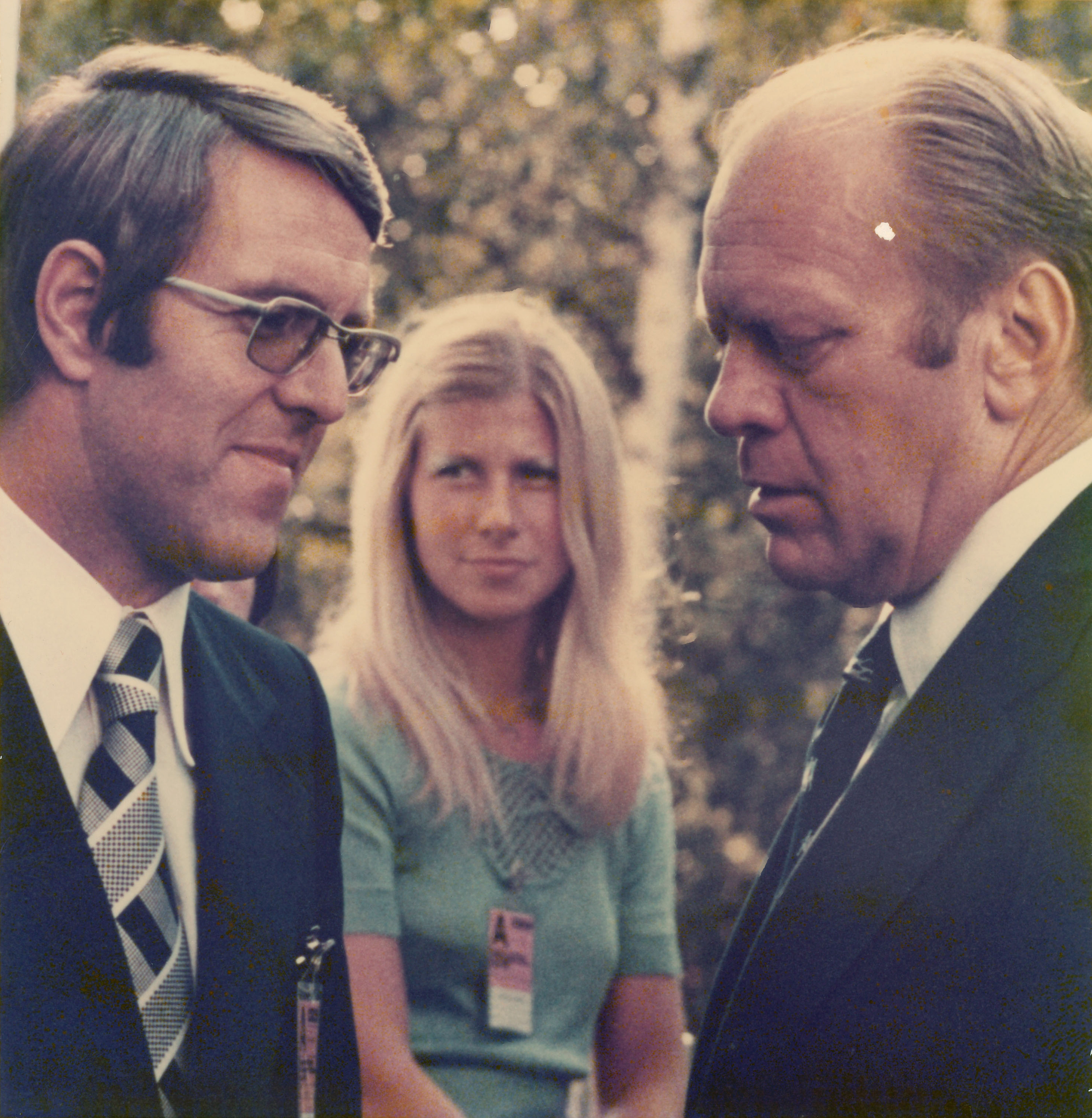
Kieber with Gerald Ford on 1 August 1975

In 1975, he was a signatory of the Helsinki Accords to create the Conference for Security and Co-operation in Europe, the precursor of today's OSCE. He also oversaw Liechtenstein's full ascension into the Council of Europe in 1978.

The Progressive Citizens' Party lost the 1978 Liechtenstein general election and Kieber again served as deputy prime minister from 26 April 1978 under Hans Brunhart. He resigned at the request of Franz Joseph II on 1 July 1980.

== Later life ==
In 1993 Kieber was a co-founder of the Centrum Bank AG in Vaduz and was a member of the bank's board of directors until 2001. He was the president of the Liechtenstein Bar Association from 1992 to 1997.

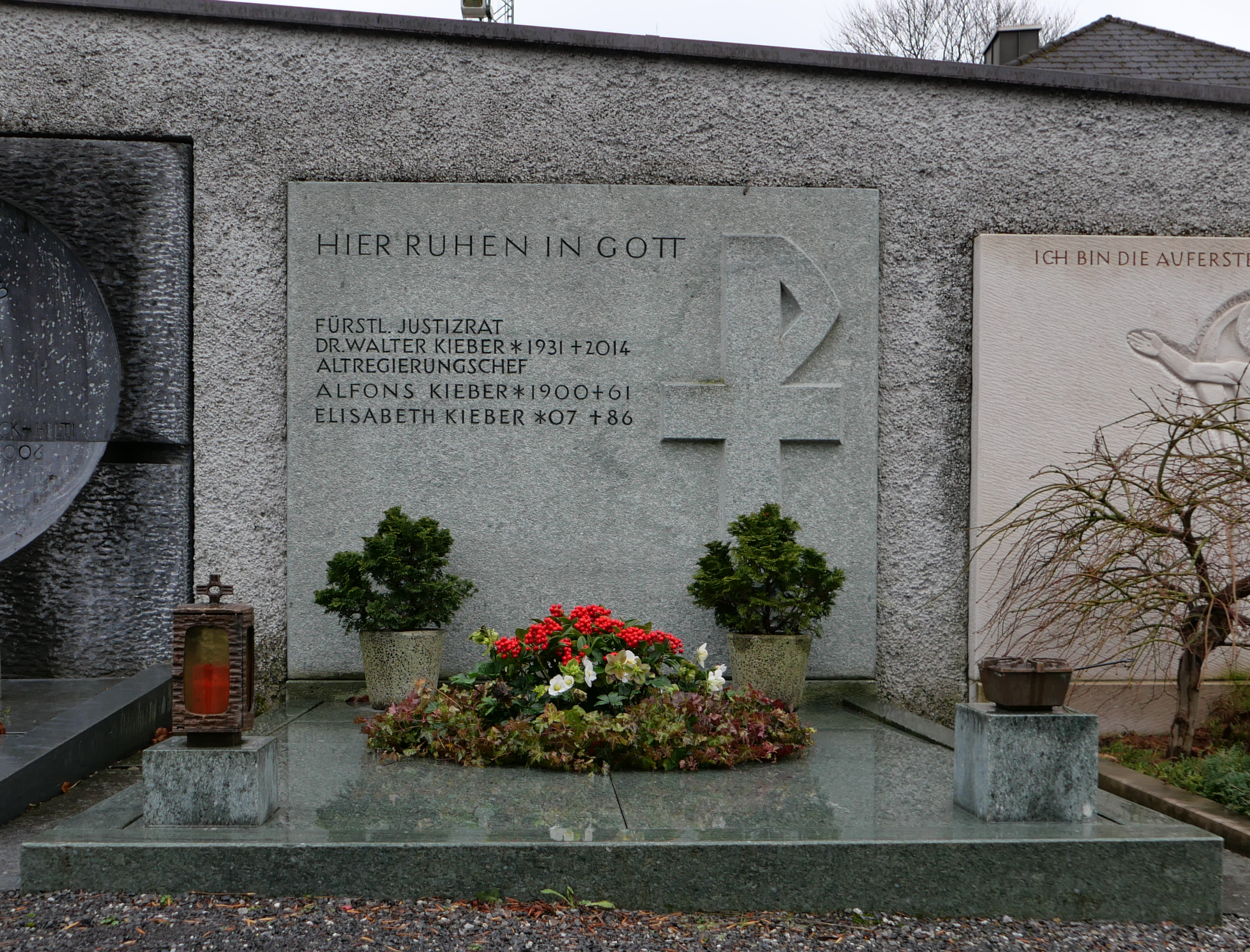
Keiber's grave in the Schaan cemetery.

== Personal life ==
Kieber married Selma Ritter (born 10 September 1934) on 16 April 1959. They had two children together. He lived in Schaan.

He died of an unspecified illness on 21 June 2014, aged 83 years old.

== Honours ==
- Austria: Decoration of Honour for Services to the Republic of Austria (1975)
- Liechtenstein: Grand Cross with Diamonds of the Order of Merit of the Principality of Liechtenstein (2003)

== See also ==
- Politics of Liechtenstein
- Walter Kieber cabinet

Political offices
Preceded by Alfred Hilbe	Head of Government of Liechtenstein; 1974-1978	Succeeded by Arthur Brunhart
