= Gerard Batliner =

Prime Minister of Liechtenstein from 1962 to 1970

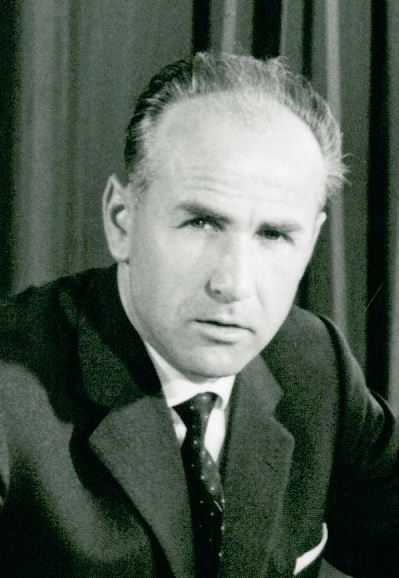

Prime Minister of Liechtenstein
- In office 16 July 1962 – 18 March 1970
- Monarch: Franz Joseph II
- Deputy: Josef Büchel; Alfred Hilbe
- Preceded by: Alexander Frick
- Succeeded by: Alfred Hilbe

President of the Landtag of Liechtenstein
- In office January 1974 – December 1977
- Monarch: Franz Joseph II
- Vice President: Karlheinz Ritter
- Preceded by: Karlheinz Ritter
- Succeeded by: Karlheinz Ritter

Member of the Landtag of Liechtenstein for Unterland
- In office 3 February 1974 – 7 February 1982

Personal details
- Born: 9 December 1928 Eschen, Liechtenstein
- Died: 25 June 2008 (aged 79) Eschen, Liechtenstein
- Party: Progressive Citizens' Party
- Spouse: Christina Negele (m. 1965)
- Children: 2

Gerard Batliner (9 December 1928 – 25 June 2008) was a lawyer and politician from Liechtenstein who served as Prime Minister of Liechtenstein from 1962 to 1970. A member of the Progressive Citizens' Party (FBP), he later served in the Landtag of Liechtenstein from 1974 to 1982 and as the President of the Landtag of Liechtenstein from 1974 to 1977. Additionally, he held numerous positions within the Council of Europe.

Initially working as a lawyer in Vaduz, Batliner entered politics as the vice president of the FBP and deputy mayor of Eschen. He succeeded Alexander Frick as prime minister following his resignation in July 1962, and upon taking office was the youngest head of government in Europe. His term in office focused on expanding Liechtenstein's foreign affairs, particularly towards membership in the Council of Europe. It also involved the introduction of numerous welfare laws and organizations. Following an electoral defeat, he resigned in February 1970.

Batliner returned to politics in 1974 when he was elected to the Landtag of Liechtenstein, for which he also served as its president from 1974 to 1977. He held positions in the Parliamentary Assembly of the Council of Europe, European Commission of Human Rights and Venice Commission. Outside of politics, he was involved in numerous academic circles, initiating the founding of and directing the Liechtenstein Institute in 1986. He died in 2008.

== Early life and career ==
Batliner was born on 9 December 1928 in Eschen as the son of farmer Andreas Batliner and Karolina Schafhauser as one of six children. He attended secondary school in Schwyz until 1948. After conducting an apprenticeship in an industrial company, he studied law in Zurich, Fribourg, and Paris from, receiving a doctor of laws in 1957. In January 1951 Batliner, alongside Georg Malin and Felix Marxer, founded the Liechtenstein Academic Society. From 1956, he worked as an independent lawyer in the capital of Vaduz.

He was a member of the board of directors of the old-age and survivors insurance in Liechtenstein from 1959 to 1962. He was the vice president of the Progressive Citizens' Party (FBP) from 1958 to 1962, in addition to also being a member of the Eschen Municipal Council and deputy mayor of the municipality from 1960 to 1962.

== Prime Minister of Liechtenstein ==
Batliner was the fifth Prime Minister of Liechtenstein, serving from 16 July 1962 to 18 March 1970; he succeeded the role from Alexander Frick following his resignation the previous month. Additionally, he held the government roles of foreign affairs, finance, education, and culture. Upon taking office at 33 years old, he was Europe's youngest head of government. Throughout his tenure, Batliner presided over a FBP-led coalition government with the Patriotic Union (VU), which had been in effect since 1938.

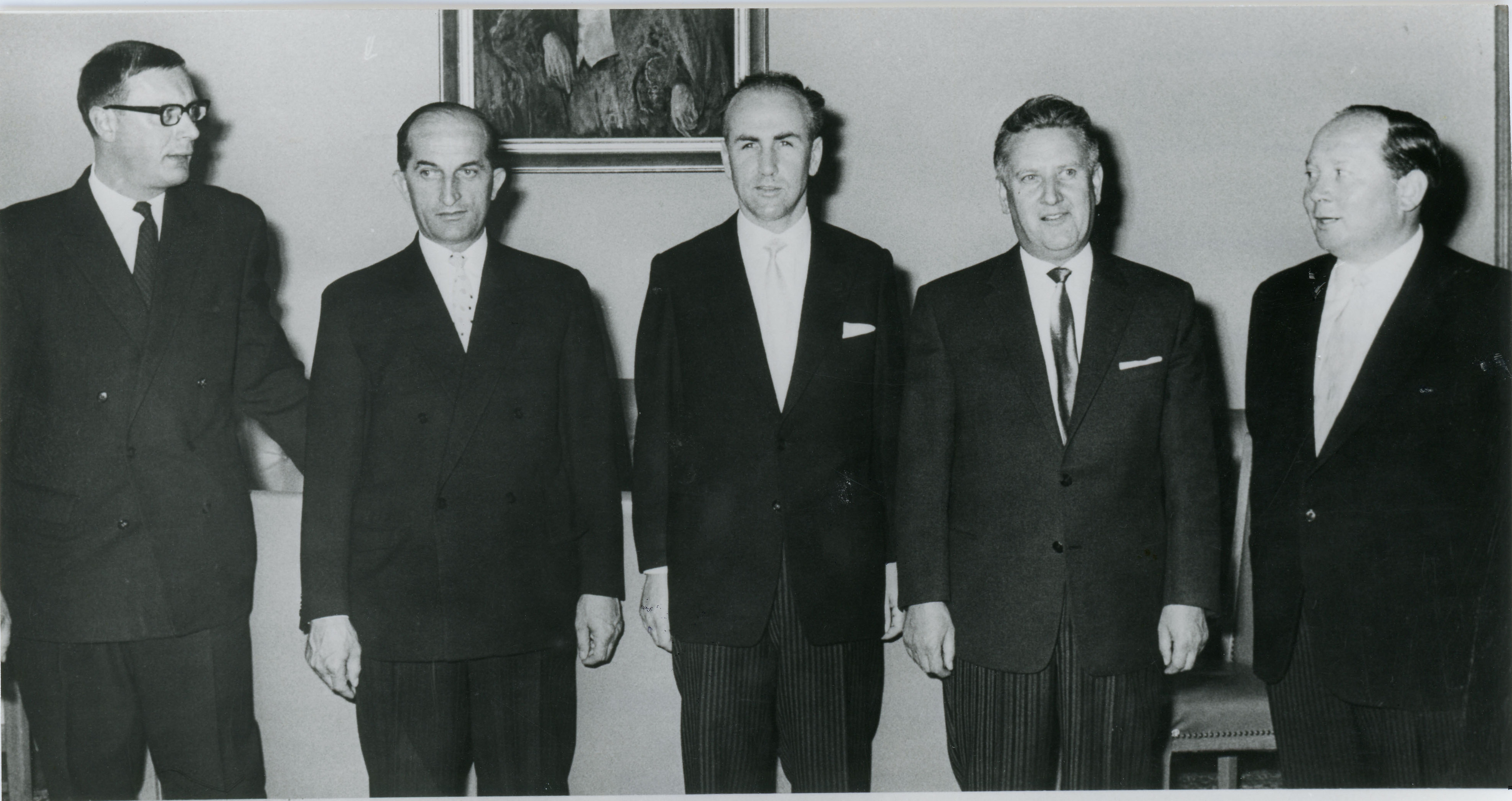
Batliner (centre) with his government in 1965

During his time in office, Batliner's government worked in expanding Liechtenstein's foreign affairs, particularly working towards the country's accession into the Council of Europe. Additionally, his term in office included the founding, among other things, the Liechtenstein Music School in 1963, the Liechtenstein Development Service in 1965, and the Liechtenstein State Art Collection in 1969. His time in office also oversaw the passing of a constitutional amendment in 1965 that expanded the amount government members in Liechtenstein from three to five, including making the deputy prime minister a full member of government with voting rights.

His government was also responsible for expanding Liechtenstein's welfare, with the creation of the Liechtenstein Development Service in 1965, the welfare office in 1966 and the Association for Special Education Assistance in 1967; unemployment insurance was introduced to Liechtenstein in 1969.

Batliner was again the FBP's candidate from prime minister in the 1970 elections; however, in the elections the VU received a majority for the first time since its founding in 1936. As a result, Batliner resigned as prime minister and was succeeded by his deputy Alfred Hilbe of the VU on 18 March.

== Later life ==
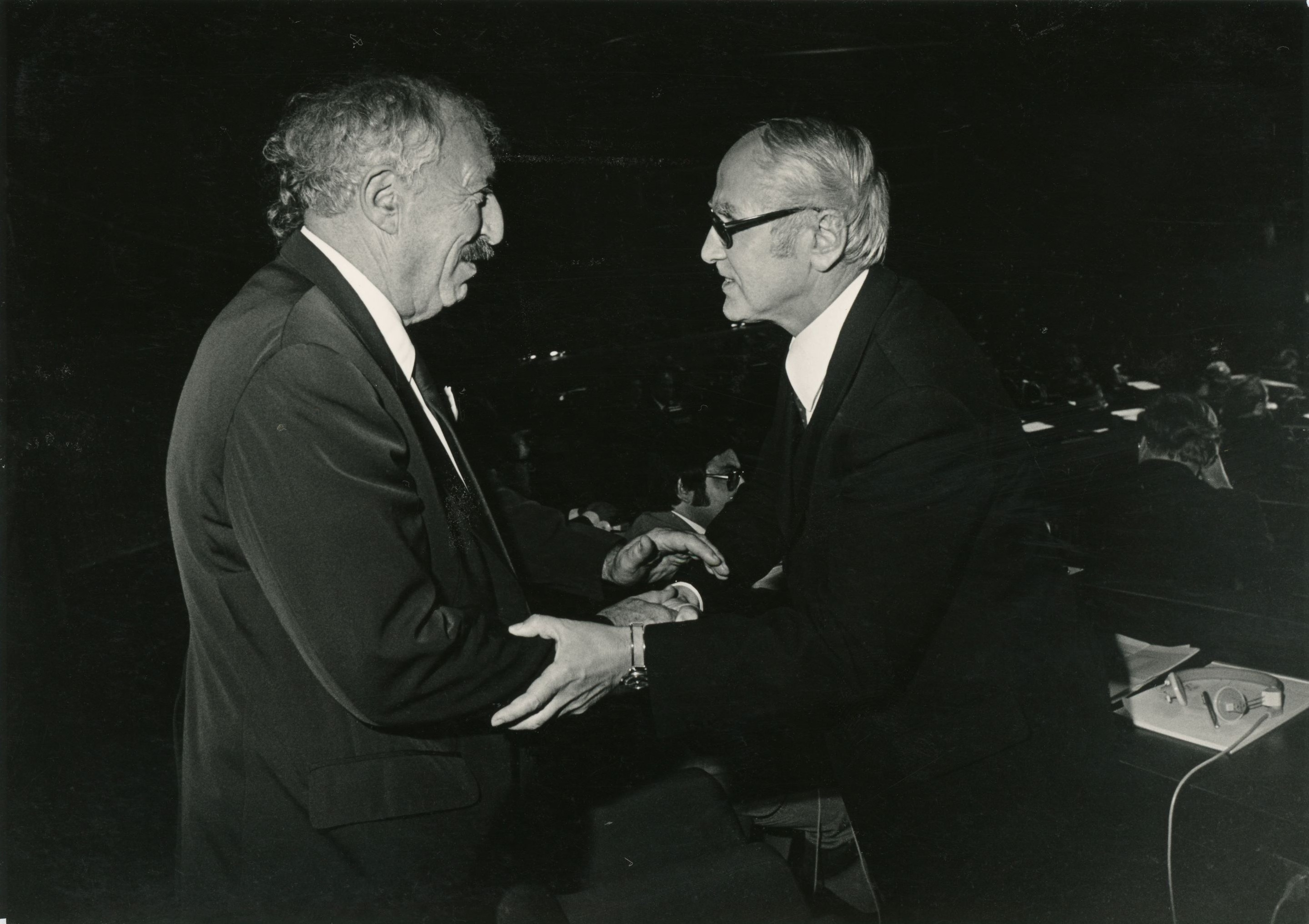
Batliner (right) with Georg Kahn-Ackermann upon Liechtenstein's accession to the Council of Europe on 23 November 1978

In 1973, Batliner was involved in the founding of the Liechtenstein Society for Environmental Protection. He became involved in politics again when he was elected to the Landtag of Liechtenstein in 1974, where he served until 1982; he was President of the Landtag from January 1974 to December 1977, and then its vice president from 1978 to 1982. Additionally, he also chaired the Landtag's state, finance, and foreign affair committees at times. From 1978 to 1982 Batliner, as a member of the Landtag, was the head of the Liechtenstein Parliamentary Delegation to the Council of Europe, and was the vice president of the Parliamentary Assembly of the Council of Europe from 1981 to 1982. After leaving the Landtag, Batliner was a member of the European Commission of Human Rights from 1983 to 1990 and then the Venice Commission from 1991 to 2003.

In August 1986, under the initiative of Batliner, the Liechtenstein Institute was founded via a joint initiative by the Liechtenstein Academic Society and the Historical Association for the Principality of Liechtenstein, for which he was the institute's director until his death and chaired its academic council from 1987 to 1997.

During the 1992 Liechtenstein constitutional crisis, Batliner, among other notable politicians, formed the Nonpartisan Committee for Monarchy and Democracy and called for a demonstration against Hans-Adam II's threatened dissolution of the Landtag and government due to disagreements regarding the date of a referendum to Liechtenstein's accession to the European Economic Area. As a result, approximately 2,000 people demonstrated in front of the government house in Vaduz. Batliner was involved in mediating a compromise between the government and prince. In the run-up to the 2003 Liechtenstein constitutional referendum, Batliner alongside other former members of the Landtag, opposed the proposed changes by the prince; he campaigned against it. However, the changes were ultimately accepted by voters.

== Personal life ==
He received honorary degrees from the University of Basel and Innsbruck.

Batliner married Christina Negele on 17 July 1965 and they had two children together. He died on 25 June 2008, aged 79 and was buried in his home-municipality of Eschen.

== Honors and awards ==
- Austria: Grand Decoration of Honour in Silver for Services to the Republic of Austria (1974)
- Liechtenstein: Grand Cross of the Order of Merit of the Principality of Liechtenstein (1967)

== See also ==
- Politics of Liechtenstein
- Gerard Batliner cabinet

== Bibliography ==
- Vogt, Paul (1987). 125 Jahre Landtag (in German). Vaduz: Landtag of the Principality of Liechtenstein.
- Malin, Georg (2009). Fürstlicher Justizrat Gerard Batliner 1928–2008 [Princely Justice Councilor Gerard Batliner 1928–2008] (in German). Vaduz: Jahrbuch des Historischen Vereins für das Fürstentum Liechtenstein.
