= Alfred Hilbe =

Prime Minister of Liechtenstein from 1970 to 1974

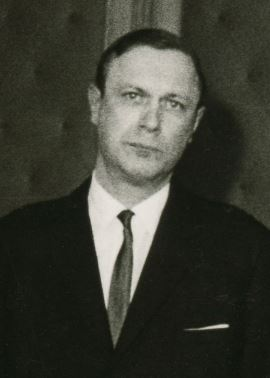
- Hilbe in 1974

Prime Minister of Liechtenstein
- In office 18 March 1970 – 27 March 1974
- Monarch: Franz Joseph II
- Deputy: Walter Kieber
- Preceded by: Gerard Batliner
- Succeeded by: Walter Kieber

Deputy Prime Minister of Liechtenstein
- In office 16 June 1965 – 18 March 1970
- Monarch: Franz Joseph II
- Prime Minister: Gerard Batliner
- Preceded by: Josef Büchel
- Succeeded by: Walter Kieber

Personal details
- Born: 22 July 1928 Gmunden, Austria
- Died: 31 October 2011 (aged 83) Feldkirch, Austria
- Party: Patriotic Union
- Spouse: Virginia Hilbe (m. 1951)
- Children: 1

Alfred Hilbe (German pronunciation: [ˈalfʁeːt ˈhɪlbə]; 22 July 1928 – 31 October 2011) was a politician from Liechtenstein who served as Prime Minister of Liechtenstein from 1970 to 1974. He previously served as Deputy Prime Minister of Liechtenstein from 1965 to 1970, under the government of Gerard Batliner.

== Early life ==
Hilbe was born in Gmunden, Austria, as the son of Franz Hilbe and Elisabeth Glatz. He attended high school in Vaduz and Zurich. Hilbe enrolled in the École libre des sciences politiques in Paris, where he received a diploma in 1950. From 1950 to 1951, he studied economics in Innsbruck.

Starting from 1954, he worked in the private sector and in the Liechtenstein embassy in Bern. He was a secretary at the Liechtenstein embassy in Bern, run by Prince Heinrich Hartneid of Liechtenstein.

== Prime Minister of Liechtenstein ==
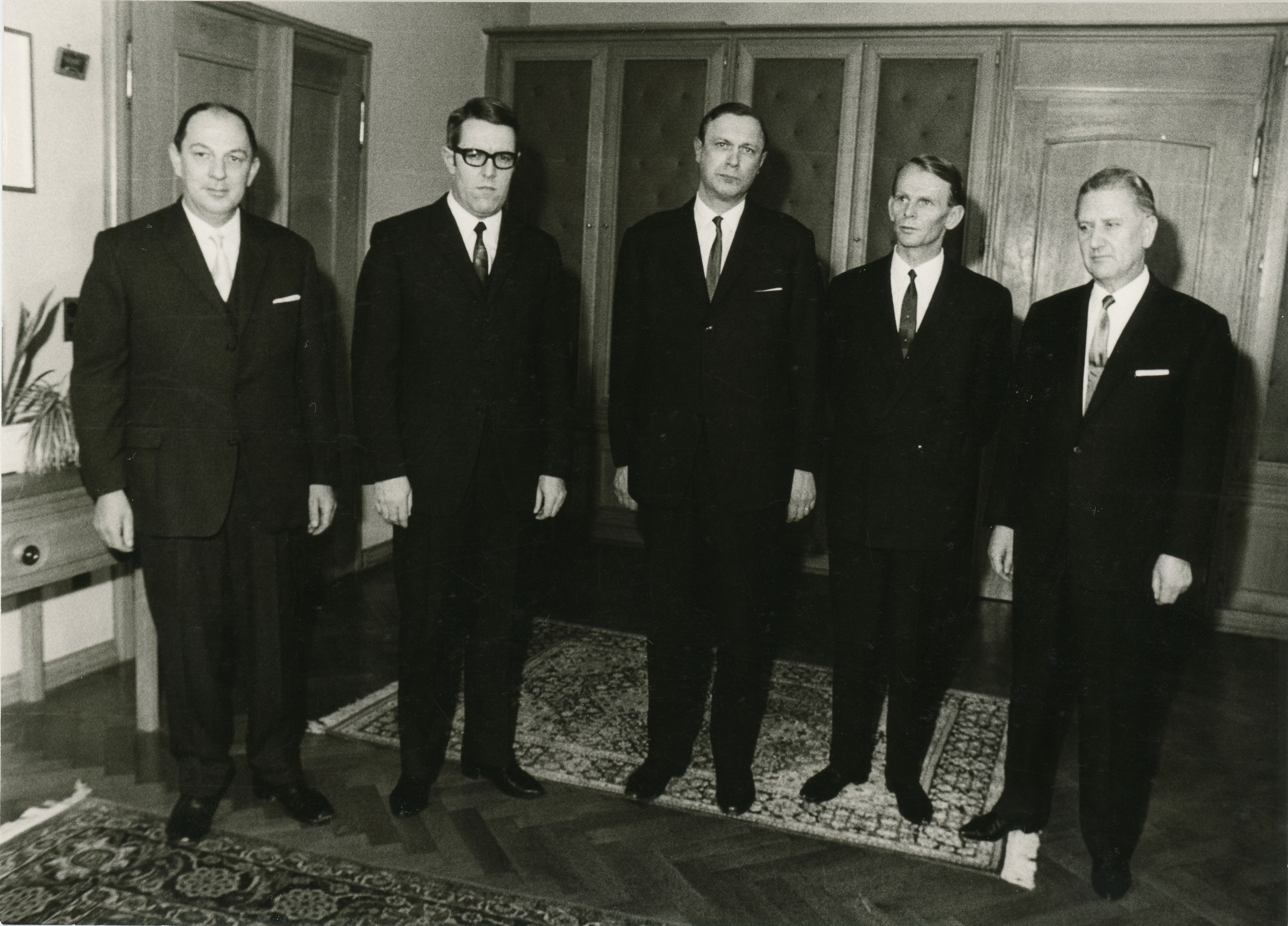
Hilbe (centre) with his government in March 1974

Hilbe was the Deputy Prime Minister of Liechtenstein from 1965 to 18 March 1970 under Gerard Batliner, and then Prime Minister of Liechtenstein from 18 March 1970 to 27 March 1974. His party Patriotic Union won the 1970 Liechtenstein general election with 49.57% of the vote, making it the first time it had held a majority since its formation in 1936 and Hilbe was appointed to serve as prime minister.

During his term in office, he pioneered reforms of Liechtenstein's school system and efforts to address women's suffrage in Liechtenstein via two separate referendums on the topic in 1971 and 1973, though unsuccessful. In addition, his term included the reopening of the Liechtenstein National Museum and the extension of a free trade agreement between Switzerland and the European Economic Community to Liechtenstein in 1972.

== Later life ==
From 1974, Hilbe became an honorary member of the Patriotic Union and a self-employed financial consultant in Vaduz and Schaan. He was also the president of the board of directors at the old age and survivors’ insurance from 1974 to 1978. From 1965 to 1995 he was a member of the press association for the Liechtensteiner Vaterland.

From 1980 to 1982, and again from 1988 to 1990, he was the president of the Switzerland–Liechtenstein society. He was also president of the Liechtenstein tennis association. He was made an honorary member of the Switzerland–Liechtenstein society in 2000.

== Personal life ==
Hilbe married Virginia Joseph (born 14 July 1928) 27 October 1951 and they had one child together. He died on 31 October 2011, aged 83 years old.

== Honours ==
- Austria: Grand Decoration of Honour in Silver for Services to the Republic of Austria (1957)
- Liechtenstein:
  - Grand Cross of the Order of Merit of the Principality of Liechtenstein (1974)
  - Grand Cross with Diamonds of the Order of Merit of the Principality of Liechtenstein (2003)

== See also ==
- Politics of Liechtenstein
- Alfred Hilbe cabinet
