= Progressive Citizens' Party =

Political party in Liechtenstein

Progressive Citizens' Party Fortschrittliche Bürgerpartei
- Abbreviation: FBP
- President: Alexander Batliner
- Founded: 22 December 1918; 107 years ago
- Headquarters: Altenbach 8; 9490 Vaduz
- Newspaper: None (Note: Previously Liechtensteiner Volksblatt.)
- Youth wing: Young FBP
- Women's wing: Women in the FBP
- Ideology: Conservatism; National conservatism; Economic liberalism; Constitutional monarchism
- Political position: Centre-right
- European affiliation: None (Note: The Progressive Citizens' Party is not an official member of any European political party, but its members in the Parliamentary Assembly of the Council of Europe sit with ALDE-PACE, and its youth wing is a member of the European Young Conservatives.)
- Colours: Blue; Yellow
- Landtag: 7 / 25
- Mayors: 4 / 11
- Municipal Councils^{a}: 51 / 104

Website
- fbp.li
- Politics of Liechtenstein; Political parties; Elections; a. Municipal Councils = Number listed on respective website subtracted by number of elected mayors (who serve as members on their respective local councils, but are elected separately from other council members) as of 2 April 2023.

The Progressive Citizens' Party in Liechtenstein (German: Fortschrittliche Bürgerpartei in Liechtenstein, FBP) (Note: Fortschrittliche Bürgerpartei can also be translated as "Progressive Civic Party".) is a conservative political party in Liechtenstein. The FBP is one of the two major political parties in Liechtenstein, along with the liberal-conservative Patriotic Union. Founded in 1918 along with the now-defunct Christian-Social People's Party, it is the oldest extant party in Liechtenstein.

== History ==
The party was established in 1918 by middle class citizens and members of the agricultural community as a response to the formation of the Christian-Social People's Party (VP). In addition to being linked to the commercial and rural environment, the party was also firmly anchored in the clergy. It won the majority of the elected the 1918 elections, but the VP formed a government following the 1918 Liechtenstein putsch.

The VP won elections in 1922, January 1926 and April 1926, but the FBP won the 1928 elections, and became the party of government until 1938, with Josef Hoop serving as prime minister until 1945. In 1938 the FBP allowed the Patriotic Union (VU) to join it in a coalition government. The two parties governed in coalition until the 1997 elections, after which the Patriotic Union formed a government. The FBP won the 2001 elections and its leader Otmar Hasler became prime minister. Following the 2005 elections the coalition was renewed, with Hasler remaining prime minister. The VU's Klaus Tschütscher held the post between 2009 and 2013, after which FBP leader Adrian Hasler became prime minister.

In the 2017 state election, the FBP lost 4.8% of the vote and was awarded only nine of the 25 seats. However, it remained the party with the most votes in the state parliament, as the Patriotic Union only gained slightly and still had eight Landtag members.

In the 2021 state elections, Adrian Hasler and government councilor Mauro Pedrazzini (also a FBP member) decided not to run for government again after eight years. With Sabine Monauni, the FBP nominated a woman as prime minister candidate for the state elections for the first time. The party nominated Katrin Eggenberger and Manuel Frick as further candidates for the government.

The FBP won 35.9% of the votes in the 2021 state elections and won 10 seats in the Landtag. Mathematically, the FBP was elected by around 100 voters (0.6%) more. The discrepancy arose from the fact that the voters in the Oberland, with 15 votes per ballot paper, had a higher weight on the total party vote result than the voters in the Unterland with ten votes per person. Voter turnout was stable at 78.0%. The FBP and VU formed a coalition government, which appointed Monauni as deputy prime minister. If she had become prime minister, she would have been the first female to hold the position.

In the 2025 elections, former president of the landtag Ernst Walch was the party's candidate for prime minister. The party further nominated Sabine Monauni and Daniel Oehry as government candidates. In the election, the FBP won 7 seats with 27.9% of the vote share, the lowest in its history.

== Ideology and policy ==
The FBP tends to be conservative on social/cultural issues. As for economic issues, it is economically liberal but also claims to follow a social market economy policy. The party states its policies are based on Christian values such as solidarity, respect and justice. It also advocates a dualistic form of government, claiming to support both the monarchy and the people as sovereigns.

=== Women's rights ===
The FBP was an early proponent of the introduction of women's suffrage to Liechtenstein, starting in 1970. However, two separate referendums on the issue were rejected by male-only voters in 1971 and 1973 respectively. The Women in the FBP group was founded in September 1982 to represent women's issues within the party, and also to further advocate for the introduction of women's suffrage. The party then again proposed the issue to the Landtag of Liechtenstein in December 1983 and again in April 1984. Following a successful referendum (among men only) in July 1984, women's suffrage was introduced to Liechtenstein.

Emma Eigenmann, belonging to the FBP, was the first woman elected to the Landtag of Liechtenstein in 1986. In the first Mario Frick cabinet, Cornelia Gassner, also belonging to the FBP, became the first female government councillor. Rita Kieber-Beck was also the first female Deputy Prime Minister of Liechtenstein.

=== LGBT rights ===
Compared to the Patriotic Union, members of the FBP are more inclined to support LGBT rights:

Differences between the two main political parties in Liechtenstein on LGBT rights
Subjects on LGBT rights	Progressive Citizens' Party	Patriotic Union
Motion to introduce a Registered Partnership law (24 October 2007)	10 For, 2 Against	6 For, 4 Against
Response to the candidate survey conducted by the Youth wing of the Free List party (leading up to the 2021 general election), containing the following question: Should same-sex couples have the same rights as heterosexual couples in all areas?	20 candidates; 18 (9 'Yes', 9 'Rather Yes') to 2 ('Rather No')	22 candidates; 15 (8 'Yes', 7 'Rather Yes') to 7 (6 'Rather No', 1 'No')
Response to a voter poll conducted in February 2021 by the Liechtenstein Institute, regarding the same survey question listed in the row above.	74% (47% 'Yes', 27% 'Rather Yes') to 27% (13% 'No', 14% 'Rather No')^{a}	68% (41% 'Yes', 27% 'Rather Yes') to 32% (15% 'No', 17% 'Rather No')
Signatories on a motion submitted on 21 September 2022 (i.e., to ask the Landtag to introduce legislation that would legalize same-sex civil marriage) 15 / 25 (60%)	10 / 10 (100% of sitting members, excluding their three (3) substitute members)	2 / 10 (20% of sitting members, excluding their three (3) substitute members)
Amendment of the General Civil Code and the Partnership Act (Equality of same-sex couples in adoption law)	10 For, 0 Against	7 For, 3 Against

a. Percentages do not add up to 100%.

The FBP also voted en bloc with the Free List (FL) party on 6 May 2022 to narrowly defeat a proposed legislation (i.e., Amendment to the Article 25 of the Partnership Act) that would have limited adoption and reproductive rights of same-sex couples.

== Presidents ==
Years	Leader	Ref
1918–Unknown	Franz Verling	
Unknown	Bernhard Risch	
Unknown	Ludwig Marxer	
Unknown	Ferdinand Risch	
Unknown	Alphons Kranz	
1945–1970	Richard Meier	
1970–1982	Peter Marxer	
1982–1986	Herbert Batliner	
1986–1987	Josef Biedermann	
1987–1992	Emanuel Vogt	
1992–1993	Hansjörg Marxer	
1993–1995	Otmar Hasler	
1995–1999	Norbert Seeger	
1999–2001	Ernst Walch	
2001–2006	Johannes Matt	
2006–2009	Marcus Vogt	
2009–2013	Alexander Batliner	
2013–2015	Elfried Hasler	
2015–2019	Thomas Banzer	
2019–2021	Marcus Vogt	
2021–2023	Rainer Gopp	
2023–2024	Daniel Oehry	
2024–	Alexander Batliner	

== Election results ==
=== Landtag elections ===
Election	Leader	Votes	%	Seats	+/–	Rank	Status
1918	Franz Verling			7 / 15	New	▲1st	Coalition
1922	Josef Ospelt			4 / 15	▼3	▼2nd	Opposition
Jan 1926	Bernhard Risch			6 / 15	▲2	2nd	Opposition
Apr 1926	Ludwig Marxer			6 / 15	Steady	2nd	Opposition
1928	Josef Hoop			11 / 15	▲5	▲1st	Majority
1930	Josef Hoop			15 / 15	▲4	1st	Majority
1932	Josef Hoop			13 / 15	▼2	1st	Majority
1936	Josef Hoop			11 / 15	▼2	1st	Majority
1939	Josef Hoop			8 / 15	▼3	1st	Coalition
1945	Josef Hoop	1,553	54.72	8 / 15	Steady	1st	Coalition
1949	Alexander Frick	1,555	52.93	8 / 15	Steady	1st	Coalition
Feb 1953	Alexander Frick	1,458	50.54	8 / 15	Steady	1st	Coalition
Jun 1953	Alexander Frick	1,568	50.43	8 / 15	Steady	1st	Coalition
1957	Alexander Frick	1,689	52.36	8 / 15	Steady	1st	Coalition
1958	Alexander Frick	1,839	54.47	9 / 15	▲1	1st	Coalition
1962	Alexander Frick	1,599	47.18	8 / 15	▼1	1st	Coalition
1966	Gerard Batliner	1,791	48.47	8 / 15	Steady	1st	Coalition
1970	Walter Kieber	1,978	48.83	7 / 15	▼1	▼2nd	Coalition
1974	Walter Kieber	17,332	50.08	8 / 15	▲1	▲1st	Coalition
1978	Walter Kieber	18,872	50.85	7 / 15	▼1	▼2nd	Coalition
1982	Hilmar Ospelt	18,273	46.53	7 / 15	Steady	2nd	Coalition
1986	Herbert Wille	39,853	42.75	7 / 15	Steady	2nd	Coalition
1989	Herbert Wille	75,417	42.13	12 / 25	▲5	2nd	Coalition
Feb 1993	Markus Büchel	71,209	44.19	12 / 25	Steady	2nd	Coalition
Oct 1993	Josef Biedermann	65,075	41.34	11 / 25	▼1	2nd	Coalition
1997	Thomas Büchel	65,914	39.20	10 / 25	▼1	2nd	Opposition
2001	Otmar Hasler	92,204	49.90	13 / 25	▲3	▲1st	Majority
2005	Otmar Hasler	94,545	48.74	12 / 25	▼1	1st	Coalition
2009	Otmar Hasler	86,951	43.47	11 / 25	▼1	▼2nd	Coalition
2013	Adrian Hasler	77,644	40.00	10 / 25	▼1	▲1st	Coalition
2017	Adrian Hasler	68,673	35.24	9 / 25	▼1	1st	Coalition
2021	Sabine Monauni	72,319	35.88	10 / 25	▲1	▼2nd	Coalition
2025	Ernst Walch	56,983	27.48	7 / 25	▼3	2nd	Coalition
