= List of cabinets of Liechtenstein =

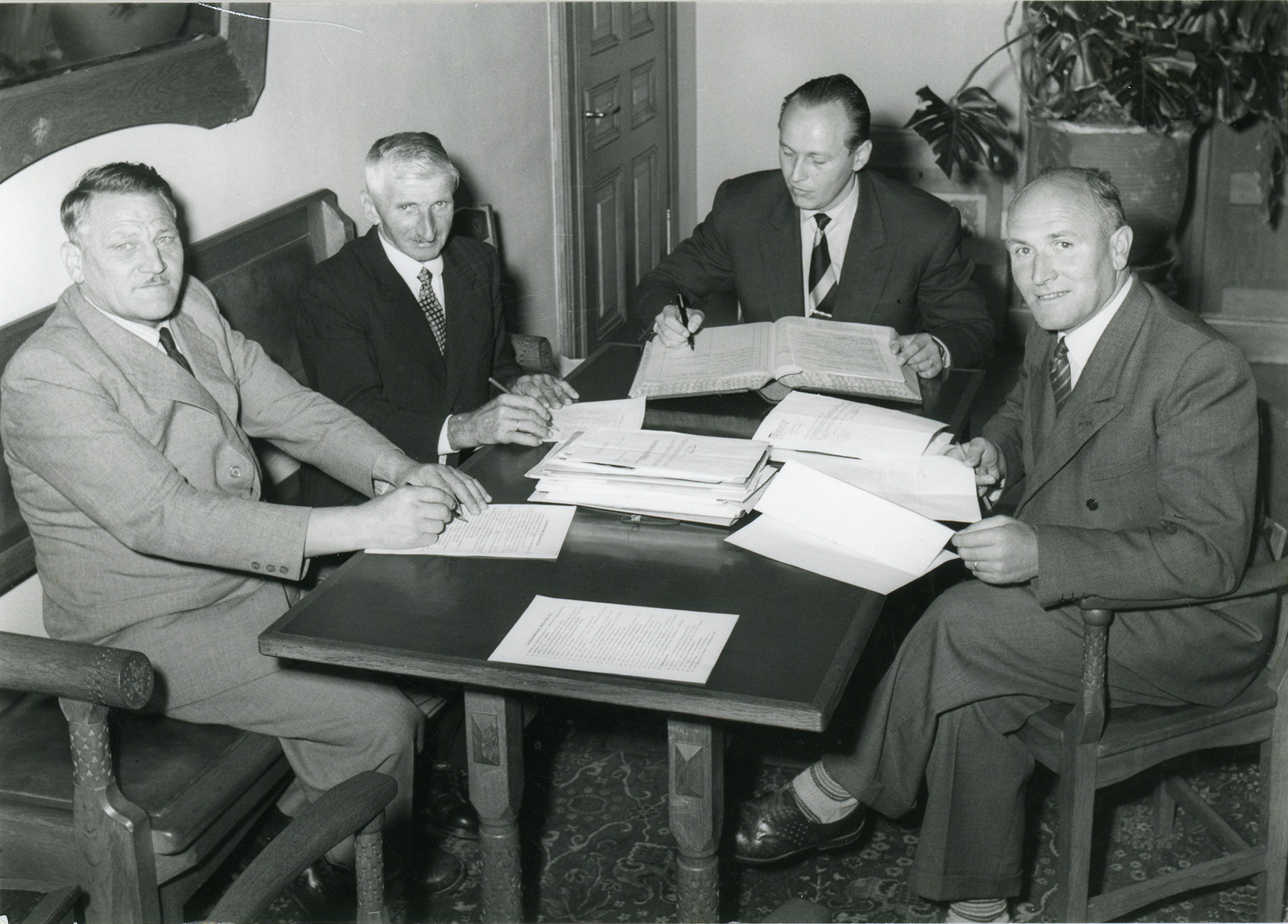
The government of Alexander Frick, pictured in 1949

The government of Liechtenstein (German: Regierung von Liechtenstein) is the national cabinet and executive body of Liechtenstein. The government is chaired by the prime minister and consists of four government councillors, all of whom are also heads of specific government ministries. The seat of the government is located in the Government Building in Vaduz. Under the 1921 constitution, one government councillor is also appointed as the deputy prime minister. Initially, governments only had two councillors and the deputy prime minister was not considered a full member of government. A constitutional amendment passed in 1965 that increased the number of councillors to four and made the deputy prime minister a full member of government with voting rights.

The origins of the Liechtenstein government can be traced back to the District office (Oberamt), headed by the Landvogt, subordinate to the House of Liechtenstein. Under the previous 1862 constitution the sovereign prince of Liechtenstein held the sole authority to appoint and dismiss government members. Under the current 1921 constitution, the members and their deputies are appointed by the prince after being elected by the Landtag of Liechtenstein (parliament of Liechtenstein) and are expected to command the confidence of both the prince and the Landtag. The prince can appoint a provisional government that may be in office for a maximum of four months without the consent of the Landtag. Councillors cannot be a member of the Landtag at the same time, although they should meet the eligibility requirements for that office. The governing party is typically the one with the most seats in the Landtag. Traditionally, Liechtenstein governments have been dominated by the Progressive Citizens' Party and the Patriotic Union in various coalition governments, with the larger party occupying the role of prime minister and having more councillors, whereas the smaller party occupies the role of deputy prime minister and has fewer councillors.

Since 10 April 2025, the incumbent government has been the Brigitte Haas cabinet, a coalition government led by the Patriotic Union with the Progressive Citizens' Party.

== List of cabinets ==
List of cabinets
No. (Note: Cabinets are numbered according to individual cabinets. For example, Josef Hoop led four different cabinets as prime minister, and are all counted separately.)	Cabinet	Prime minister (Note: Known as 'State Administrator' or 'Governor' until 1921)	Term of office			Governing party	Monarch (Reign)	Ref(s).
No.	Cabinet	Prime minister	Formed	Dissolved	Duration	Governing party	Monarch (Reign)	Ref(s).
1	Karl Freiherr Haus von Hausen cabinet	Karl Freiherr Haus von Hausen	April 1861	23 September 1884	23 years, 5 months	—	Johann II (1858–1929)	
2	First Carl von In der Maur cabinet	Carl von In der Maur	23 September 1884	5 September 1892	7 years, 348 days	—	Johann II (1858–1929)	
3	Friedrich Stellwag von Carion cabinet	Friedrich Stellwag von Carion	5 September 1892	24 October 1896	4 years, 49 days	—	Johann II (1858–1929)	
4	Second Carl von In der Maur cabinet	Carl von In der Maur	24 October 1896	11 December 1913	21 years, 48 days	—	Johann II (1858–1929)	
5	Leopold Freiherr von Imhof cabinet	Leopold Freiherr von Imhof	1 April 1914	13 November 1918 (Note: The cabinet came to a de facto end on 7 November following the 1918 Liechtenstein putsch, but it did not de jure end until 13 November.)	4 years, 226 days	—	Johann II (1858–1929)	
6	Provisional Executive Committee	Martin Ritter	7 November 1918	7 December 1918	30 days	VP/FBP	Johann II (1858–1929)	
7	Prince Karl Aloys cabinet	Prince Karl Aloys of Liechtenstein	7 December 1918	15 September 1920	1 year, 283 days	—	Johann II (1858–1929)	
8	Josef Peer cabinet	Josef Peer	15 September 1920	23 March 1921	196 days	—	Johann II (1858–1929)	
9	Josef Ospelt cabinet	Josef Ospelt	23 March 1921	4 May 1922	1 year, 42 days	FBP/VP	Johann II (1858–1929)	
10	Gustav Schädler cabinet	Gustav Schädler	10 June 1922	15 June 1928	6 years, 5 days	VP/FBP	Johann II (1858–1929)	
11	First Josef Hoop cabinet	Josef Hoop	6 August 1928	28 February 1936	7 years, 206 days	FBP	Franz I (1929–1938)	
12	Second Josef Hoop cabinet	Josef Hoop	28 February 1936	30 March 1938	2 years, 30 days	FBP/VU	Franz Joseph II (1938–1989)	
13	Third Josef Hoop cabinet	Josef Hoop	30 March 1938	9 November 1944	6 years, 224 days	FBP/VU	Franz Joseph II (1938–1989)	
14	Fourth Josef Hoop cabinet	Josef Hoop	9 November 1944	3 September 1945	298 days	FBP/VU	Franz Joseph II (1938–1989)	
15	First Alexander Frick cabinet	Alexander Frick	3 September 1945	8 March 1951	5 years, 186 days	FBP/VU	Franz Joseph II (1938–1989)	
16	Second Alexander Frick cabinet	Alexander Frick	8 March 1951	31 December 1957	6 years, 298 days	FBP/VU	Franz Joseph II (1938–1989)	
17	Third Alexander Frick cabinet	Alexander Frick	31 December 1957	16 July 1962	4 years, 197 days	FBP/VU	Franz Joseph II (1938–1989)	
18	First Gerard Batliner cabinet	Gerard Batliner	16 July 1962	16 June 1965	2 years, 335 days	FBP/VU	Franz Joseph II (1938–1989)	
19	Second Gerard Batliner cabinet	Gerard Batliner	16 June 1965	12 June 1969	3 years, 361 days	FBP/VU	Franz Joseph II (1938–1989)	
20	Third Gerard Batliner cabinet	Gerard Batliner	12 June 1969	18 March 1970	279 days	FBP/VU	Franz Joseph II (1938–1989)	
21	Alfred Hilbe cabinet	Alfred Hilbe	18 March 1970	27 March 1974	4 years, 9 days	VU/FBP	Franz Joseph II (1938–1989)	
22	Walter Kieber cabinet	Walter Kieber	27 March 1974	26 April 1978	4 years, 30 days	FBP/VU	Franz Joseph II (1938–1989)	
23	First Hans Brunhart cabinet	Hans Brunhart	26 April 1978	7 April 1982	4 years, 72 days	VU/FBP	Franz Joseph II (1938–1989)	
24	Second Hans Brunhart cabinet	Hans Brunhart	7 April 1982	2 May 1986	3 years, 299 days	VU/FBP	Franz Joseph II (1938–1989)	
25	Third Hans Brunhart cabinet	Hans Brunhart	2 May 1986	5 June 1989	3 years, 34 days	VU/FBP	Franz Joseph II (1938–1989)	
26	Fourth Hans Brunhart cabinet	Hans Brunhart	5 June 1989	26 May 1993	3 years, 355 days	VU/FBP	Franz Joseph II (1938–1989)	
26	Fourth Hans Brunhart cabinet	Hans Brunhart	5 June 1989	26 May 1993	3 years, 355 days	VU/FBP	Hans-Adam II (1989–present)	
27	Markus Büchel cabinet	Markus Büchel	26 May 1993	15 December 1993	203 days	FBP/VU	Hans-Adam II (1989–present)	
28	First Mario Frick cabinet	Mario Frick	15 December 1993	14 April 1997	3 years, 120 days	VU/FBP	Hans-Adam II (1989–present)	
29	Second Mario Frick cabinet	Mario Frick	14 April 1997	5 April 2001	3 years, 356 days	VU	Hans-Adam II (1989–present)	
30	First Otmar Hasler cabinet	Otmar Hasler	5 April 2001	21 April 2005	4 years, 16 days	FBP	Hans-Adam II (1989–present)	
31	Second Otmar Hasler cabinet	Otmar Hasler	21 April 2005	25 March 2009	3 years, 338 days	FBP/VU	Hans-Adam II (1989–present)	
32	Klaus Tschütscher cabinet	Klaus Tschütscher	25 March 2009	27 March 2013	4 years, 2 days	VU/FBP	Hans-Adam II (1989–present)	
33	First Adrian Hasler cabinet	Adrian Hasler	27 March 2013	30 March 2017	4 years, 3 days	FBP/VU	Hans-Adam II (1989–present)	
34	Second Adrian Hasler cabinet	Adrian Hasler	30 March 2017	25 March 2021	3 years, 360 days	FBP/VU	Hans-Adam II (1989–present)	
35	Daniel Risch cabinet	Daniel Risch	25 March 2021	10 April 2025	4 years, 16 days	VU/FBP	Hans-Adam II (1989–present)	
36	Brigitte Haas cabinet	Brigitte Haas	10 April 2025		1 year, 212 days	VU/FBP	Hans-Adam II (1989–present)	

== See also ==
- List of heads of government of Liechtenstein
- List of Liechtenstein general elections
- List of monarchs of Liechtenstein
- Politics of Liechtenstein

== Bibliography ==
- Vogt, Paul (1987). 125 Jahre Landtag (in German). Vaduz, Liechtenstein: Landtag of the Principality of Liechtenstein.
