= Josef Hoop cabinet =

Josef Hoop cabinet may refer to:

- First Josef Hoop cabinet, governing body of Liechtenstein (1928–1936)
- Second Josef Hoop cabinet, governing body of Liechtenstein (1936–1938)
- Third Josef Hoop cabinet, governing body of Liechtenstein (1938–1944)
- Fourth Josef Hoop cabinet, governing body of Liechtenstein (1944–1945)

== See also ==
- Josef Hoop
