= Alexander Frick cabinet =

Alexander Frick cabinet may refer to:

- First Alexander Frick cabinet, governing body of Liechtenstein (1945–1951)
- Second Alexander Frick cabinet, governing body of Liechtenstein (1951–1957)
- Third Alexander Frick cabinet, governing body of Liechtenstein (1957–1962)

== See also ==
- Alexander Frick
