= First Alexander Frick cabinet =

Governing body of Liechtenstein (1945–1951)

- Government of Liechtenstein

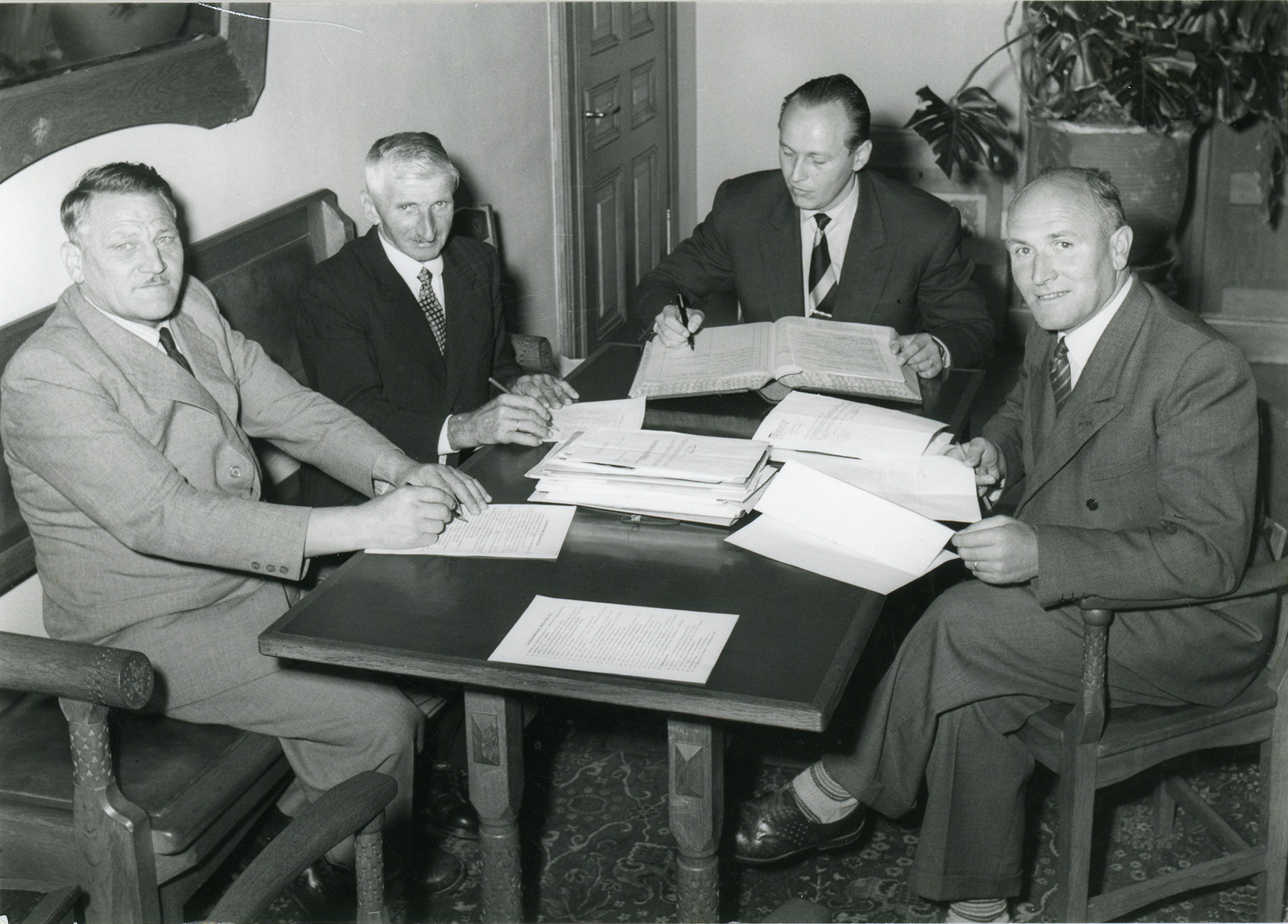
- Frick's cabinet in 1949
- Date formed: 3 September 1945
- Date dissolved: 8 March 1951

People and organisations
- Head of state: Franz Joseph II
- Head of government: Alexander Frick
- Deputy head of government: Ferdinand Nigg
- Total no. of members: 5
- Member parties: FBP; VU
- Status in legislature: Coalition

History
- Election: 1949
- Predecessor: Fourth Hoop cabinet
- Successor: Second Alexander Frick cabinet

The first Alexander Frick cabinet was the governing body of Liechtenstein from 3 September 1945 to 8 March 1951. It was appointed by Franz Joseph II and chaired by Alexander Frick.

== History ==
Josef Hoop resigned as Prime Minister of Liechtenstein on 3 September 1945, and as a result the Fourth Hoop cabinet was dissolved. He was succeeded by Alexander Frick.

Upon taking office in 1945, the cabinet was faced with the challenge of dealing with the members of the First Russian National Army that had taken refuge in the country a few months prior. They were cared for by the Liechtenstein Red Cross. On 16 August 1945, the Soviet Union sent a delegation to Liechtenstein in an attempt to repatriate the Russians, which was refused despite increasing Soviet pressure to participate in the repatriation program. Eventually the government of Argentina offered the Russians asylum, and about a hundred people left. Liechtenstein was the only country that did not participate in the Soviet repatriation program.

According to Frick, with the support of Franz Joseph II, the Russians were at no point in danger of being extradited and the general population of Liechtenstein supported the government in providing asylum to them.

In 1949, the government oversaw Liechtenstein ceding the Ellhorn mountain to Switzerland as a result of Swiss demands and threats to, among other things, cease end the customs union between the two countries. Despite the local community in Balzers previously refusing to do so in November 1948, the transfer was approved by the Landtag of Liechtenstein the following month. In exchange to the transfer, Switzerland agreed to forgive much of Liechtenstein's debt that it had acquired to the country throughout World War II.

The cabinet was continued following the 1949 Liechtenstein general election. It was dissolved on 8 March 1951 and succeeded by the Second Alexander Frick cabinet.

== Members ==
| Picture | Name | Term | Party |
Prime Minister
| | Alexander Frick | 3 September 1945 – 8 March 1951 | Progressive Citizens' Party |
Deputy Prime Minister
| | Ferdinand Nigg | 3 September 1945 – 8 March 1951 | Patriotic Union |
Government councillors
| | Franz Xaver Hoop | 3 September 1945 – 8 March 1951 | Progressive Citizens' Party |
| | Alois Wille | 3 September 1945 – 8 April 1949 | Patriotic Union |
| | Marzell Heidegger | 8 April 1949 – 8 March 1951 | Patriotic Union |

== See also ==
- Politics of Liechtenstein
