= Second Alexander Frick cabinet =

Governing body of Liechtenstein (1951–1957)

- Government of Liechtenstein

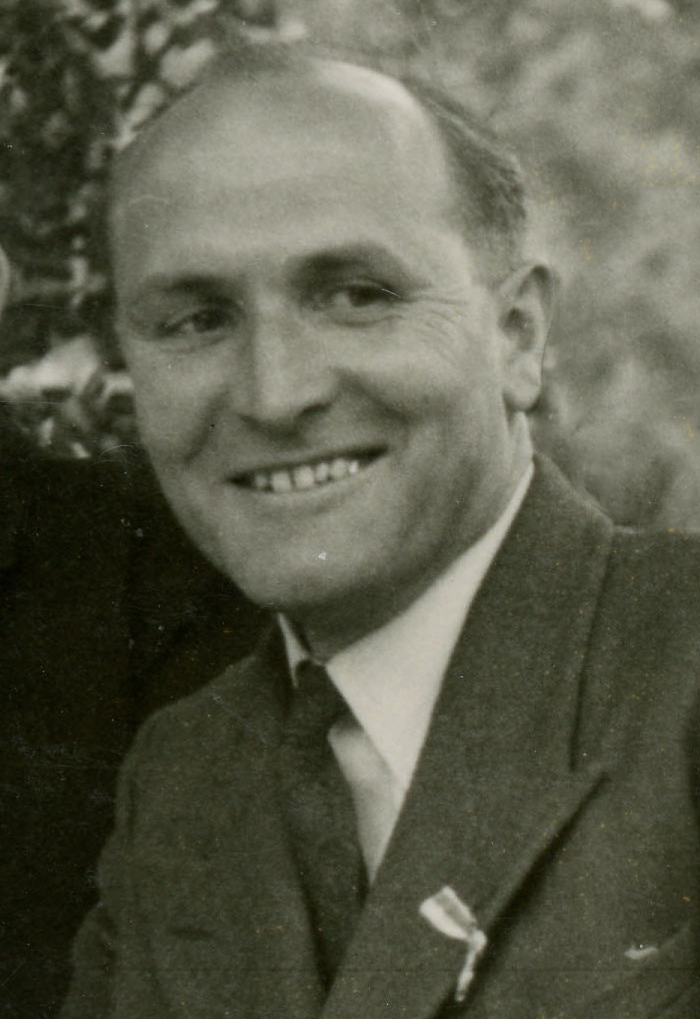
- Date formed: 8 March 1951
- Date dissolved: 31 December 1957

People and organisations
- Head of state: Franz Joseph II
- Head of government: Alexander Frick
- Deputy head of government: Ferdinand Nigg; Josef Büchel
- Total no. of members: 6
- Member parties: FBP; VU
- Status in legislature: Coalition

History
- Elections: Feb 1953; Jun 1953; 1957
- Predecessor: First Alexander Frick cabinet
- Successor: Third Alexander Frick cabinet

The second Alexander Frick cabinet was the governing body of Liechtenstein from 8 March 1951 to 31 December 1957. It was appointed by Franz Joseph II and chaired by Alexander Frick.

== History ==
The cabinet succeeded the First Alexander Frick cabinet on 8 March 1951 with Alexander Frick continuing as Prime Minister of Liechtenstein. The cabinet remained following the February 1953, and June 1953 general elections.

The government's term was characterized by the transformation of Liechtenstein into a modern welfare state. In 1952 it succeeded in introducing pensions and survivors insurance via a referendum on the subject despite resistance from local businesses and agricultural establishments, followed by the introduction of family compensation in 1957.

Deputy prime minister Ferdinand Nigg died in office on 13 July 1957 and was succeeded by Josef Büchel.

Following the 1957 Liechtenstein general election, the cabinet was dissolved on 31 December 1957 and succeeded by the Third Alexander Frick cabinet.

== Members ==
| Picture | Name | Term | Party |
Prime Minister
| | Alexander Frick | 8 March 1951 – 31 December 1957 | Progressive Citizens' Party |
Deputy Prime Minister
| | Ferdinand Nigg | 8 March 1951 – 13 July 1957 † | Patriotic Union |
| | Josef Büchel | 17 July 1957 – 31 December 1957 | Patriotic Union |
Government councillors
| | Franz Xaver Hoop | 8 March 1951 – 9 July 1953 | Progressive Citizens' Party |
| | Josef Meier | 9 July 1953 – 31 December 1957 | Progressive Citizens' Party |
| | Marzell Heidegger | 8 March 1951 – 13 July 1957 | Patriotic Union |

== See also ==
- Politics of Liechtenstein
