= Ivo Beck =

Liechtensteiner politician (1926–1991)

Government councillor for the VU
- In office 31 December 1957 – March 1959
- Preceded by: Marzell Heidegger
- Succeeded by: Gottfried Hilti

Member of the Landtag of Liechtenstein for Oberland
- In office 6 February 1966 – 1 February 1970
- In office 15 February 1953 – 1 September 1957

Personal details
- Born: Ivo Maria Beck; 31 March 1926 Vaduz, Liechtenstein
- Died: 9 September 1991 (aged 65) Heidelberg, Germany
- Party: Patriotic Union
- Spouse(s): Elisabeth Batliner (m. 1951) Irmgard Haberlandt (m. 1976)
- Children: 4
- Parent(s): Wilhelm Beck; Maria Anna Bürke

Ivo Maria Beck (/ˈbɛk/, German: [ˈiːvoː maˈriːa ˈbɛk]; 31 March 1926 – 9 September 1991) was a lawyer and politician from Liechtenstein who served in the Landtag of Liechtenstein from 1953 to 1957 and again from 1966 to 1970. Additionally, he served the president of the Patriotic Union from 1951 to 1959 and as a government councillor from 1957 to 1959.

== Life ==
Beck was born on 31 March 1926 in Vaduz as the son of President of the Landtag of Liechtenstein Wilhelm Beck and Maria Anna Bürke as one of four children. From 1939 to 1945 attended high school in Schwyz and Vaduz before studying law in Bern, where he received a doctorate. In 1950 he founded a law firm in Vaduz and then in 1957 he founded the Administral Anstalt trust company in Triesen.

From 1951 to 1959 Beck was the president of the Patriotic Union. From February 1953 to 1957 he was a member of the Landtag of Liechtenstein. During this time he was the parliamentary group spokesman and temporarily a member of the audit commission. In addition, he was the editor for the Liechtensteiner Vaterland from 1952 to 1958. From 31 December 1957 to March 1959 he was a government councilor in the Third Alexander Frick cabinet, then a deputy councilor from 1962 to 1966.

Beck was again a member of the Landtag from 1966 to 1970. From 1961 to 1969 he was secretary of the banking commission and from 1964 to 1970 he was chairman of the board of directors of the AHV/IV/FAK in Liechtenstein. From 1976 to 1980 he was president of the state tax commission and from 1979 to 1983 he was chairman of the examination commission for trustees. In 1979 he was a co-founder and first president of the Association of Liechtenstein Judges until 1985, and finally he was a member of the state court of Liechtenstein.

== Personal life ==
Beck married Elisabeth Batliner on 17 July 1951, and they had four children together. He then went on to marry Irmgard Haberlandt on 9 April 1976.

He authored and edited several legal publications within Liechtenstein, in addition to possessing a private musical instrument collection. He was an honorary member of the MGV church choir and the Harmoniemusik in Triesenberg. In 1954 he received the Golden Lily of the Liechtenstein Boy Scouts.

Beck died on 9 September 1991 in Heidelberg, aged 65 years old.

== Bibliography ==
- Vogt, Paul (1987). 125 Jahre Landtag (in German). Vaduz: Landtag of the Principality of Liechtenstein.
