= Third Alexander Frick cabinet =

Governing body of Liechtenstein (1957–1962)

- Government of Liechtenstein

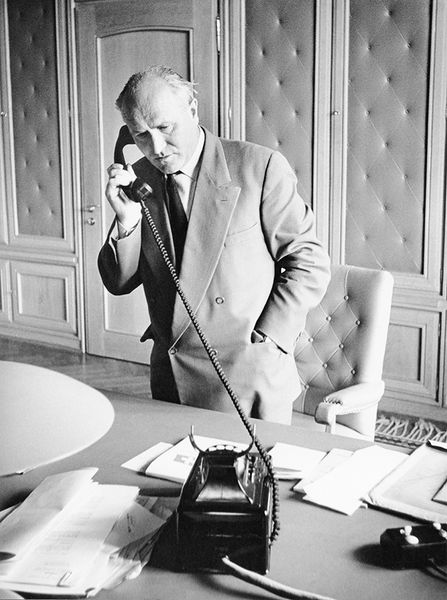
- Date formed: 31 December 1957
- Date dissolved: 16 July 1962

People and organisations
- Head of state: Franz Joseph II
- Head of government: Alexander Frick
- Deputy head of government: Josef Büchel
- Total no. of members: 5
- Member parties: FBP; VU
- Status in legislature: Coalition

History
- Elections: 1958; 1962
- Predecessor: Second Alexander Frick cabinet
- Successor: First Gerard Batliner cabinet

The third Alexander Frick cabinet was the governing body of Liechtenstein from 31 December 1957 to 16 July 1962. It was appointed by Franz Joseph II and chaired by Alexander Frick.

== History ==
The cabinet succeeded the Second Alexander Frick cabinet on 31 December 1957 with Alexander Frick continuing as Prime Minister of Liechtenstein. The cabinet remained after the 1958 and 1962 general elections.

The government succeeded in introducing disability insurance in 1959. It also attempted to gain Liechtenstein's membership in the European Free Trade Association, but was unsuccessful, instead being represented by Switzerland.

Frick resigned on 16 July 1962 reportedly for health reasons. As a result, the cabinet was dissolved and he was succeeded by Gerard Batliner in the First Gerard Batliner cabinet.

== Members ==
Picture	Name	Term	Party
Prime Minister
	Alexander Frick	31 December 1957 – 16 July 1962	Progressive Citizens' Party
Deputy Prime Minister
	Josef Büchel	31 December 1957 – 16 July 1962	Patriotic Union
Government councillors
	Josef Meier	31 December 1957 – 1 March 1958	Progressive Citizens' Party
	Josef Oehri	1 March 1958 – 16 July 1962	Progressive Citizens' Party
	Ivo Beck	31 December 1957 – March 1959	Patriotic Union
	Gottfried Hilti	March 1959 – 16 July 1962	Patriotic Union

== See also ==
- Politics of Liechtenstein
