= Gottfried Hilti =

Liechtenstein sculptor and politician (1903–1977)

Liechtenstein government councillor
- In office March 1959 – 16 July 1962
- Prime Minister: Alexander Frick
- Preceded by: Ivo Beck
- Succeeded by: Alois Vogt

Personal details
- Born: 9 April 1903 Schaan, Liechtenstein
- Died: 12 May 1977 (aged 74) Vaduz, Liechtenstein
- Party: Patriotic Union
- Spouse: Gertrud Hilti (m. 1936)
- Relations: Toni Hilti (brother); Eugen Hilti (brother); Martin Hilti (brother); Diana Hilti (granddaughter)
- Children: 6

Gottfied Hilti (9 April 1903 – 12 May 1977) was a sculptor and politician from Liechtenstein who served as a government councillor from 1959 to 1962.

== Life ==
Hilti was born on 9 April 1903 in Schaan as the son of deputy member of the Landtag Josef Hilti and Walburga (née Quaderer) as one of twelve children. He attended secondary school in Vaduz and then conducted a sculptor apprenticeship in Feldkirch before further studies at the Academy of Fine Arts in Munich.

For several years, he was in Berlin, Paris, and Geneva before returning to Schaan in 1930 and opened a sculpture studio. Notable works by Hilti include a bust of Johann II, Prince of Liechtenstein outside the Church of St. Laurentius in Schaan, numerous gravestones, and the interiors of the parish churches in Eschen and Balzers.

Hilti unsuccessfully ran for a seat in the Landtag of Liechtenstein in the 1936 elections as a member of the Patriotic Union (VU). He served as a deputy government councillor from 1953 to 1959, and then as a full government councillor from 1959 to 1962. He was also a member of the Monument Protection Commission.

Hilti married Getrud Hilti (12 July 1910 – 24 July 1984) on 22 June 1936 and they had six children together. His brothers Toni, Eugen, and Martin were prominent entrepreneurs and industrialists. He died of a long illness on 12 May 1977, aged 74. His granddaughter Diana Hilti served in the Landtag from 2009 to 2013.

== Bibliography ==
- Vogt, Paul (1987). 125 Jahre Landtag (in German). Vaduz: Landtag of the Principality of Liechtenstein.
