= First Gerard Batliner cabinet =

Governing body of Liechtenstein (1962–1965)

- Government of Liechtenstein

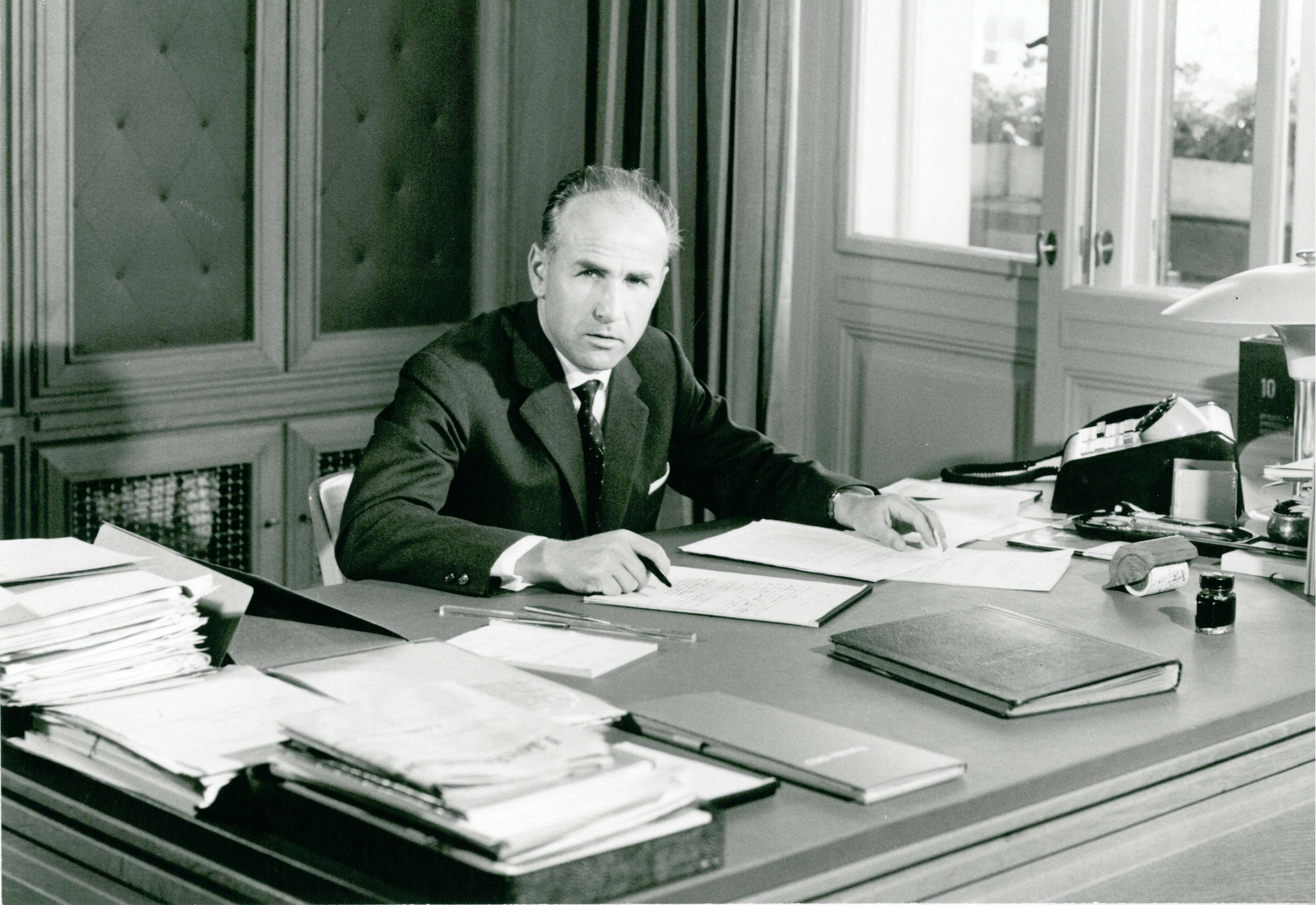
- Date formed: 16 July 1962
- Date dissolved: 16 June 1965

People and organisations
- Head of state: Franz Joseph II
- Head of government: Gerard Batliner
- Deputy head of government: Josef Büchel
- Total no. of members: 4
- Member parties: FBP; VU
- Status in legislature: Coalition

History
- Predecessor: Third Alexander Frick cabinet
- Successor: Second Gerard Batliner cabinet

The first Gerard Batliner cabinet was the governing body of Liechtenstein from 16 July 1962 to 16 June 1965. It was appointed by Franz Joseph II and chaired by Gerard Batliner.

== History ==
Alexander Frick resigned as Prime Minister of Liechtenstein on 16 July 1962 and as a result the Third Alexander Frick cabinet was dissolved. He was succeeded by Gerard Batliner.

The government's term included the founding of the Liechtenstein music school in 1963 and the cultural youth advisory council the following year. It also started the proceedings for Liechtenstein's accession to the Council of Europe.

The cabinet was dissolved on 16 June 1965 and was succeeded by the Second Gerard Batliner cabinet.

== Members ==
Picture	Name	Term		Party
Prime Minister
	Gerard Batliner	16 July 1962 – 16 June 1965	Foreign affairs; Finance; Education; Culture	Progressive Citizens' Party
Deputy Prime Minister
	Josef Büchel	16 July 1962 – 16 June 1965	Unknown	Patriotic Union
Government councillors
	Josef Oehri	16 July 1962 – 16 June 1965	Construction	Progressive Citizens' Party
	Alois Vogt	16 July 1962 – 16 June 1965	Unknown	Patriotic Union

== See also ==
- Politics of Liechtenstein
