= Third Josef Hoop cabinet =

Governing body of Liechtenstein (1938–1944)

- Government of Liechtenstein

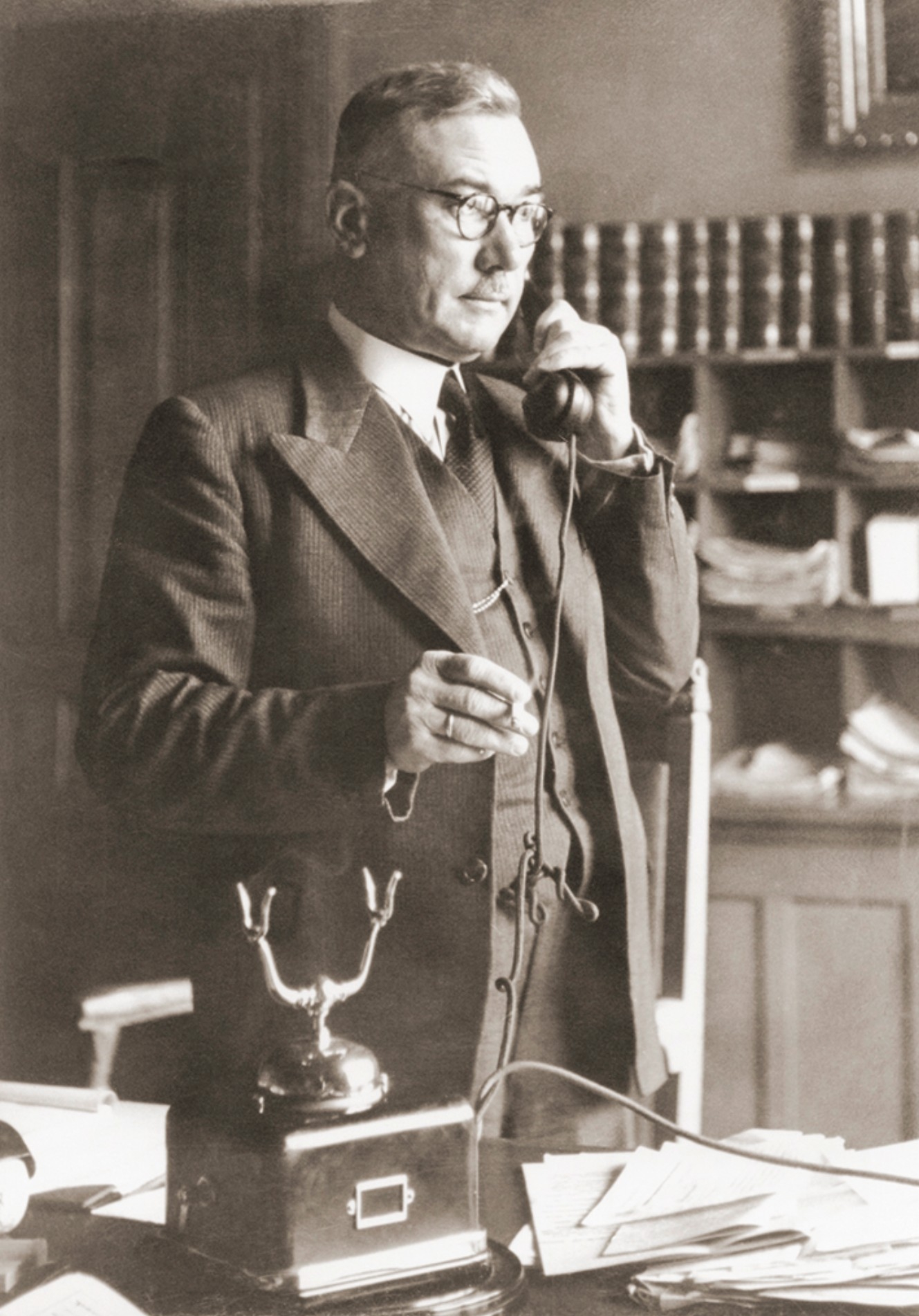
- Date formed: 30 March 1938
- Date dissolved: 9 November 1944

People and organisations
- Head of state: Franz I Franz Joseph II
- Head of government: Josef Hoop
- Deputy head of government: Alois Vogt
- Total no. of members: 5
- Member parties: FBP; VU
- Status in legislature: Coalition

History
- Election: 1939
- Predecessor: Second Josef Hoop cabinet
- Successor: Fourth Josef Hoop cabinet

The third Josef Hoop cabinet was the governing body of Liechtenstein from 30 March 1938 to 9 November 1944. It was appointed by Franz Joseph II and chaired by Josef Hoop. The cabinet was formed as a coalition government following the Anschluss of Austria in 1938, and it oversaw the majority of World War II before being succeeded in 1944.

== History ==
In the wake of the Anschluss of Austria under the initiative of Franz Joseph, the Progressive Citizens' Party and Patriotic Union started negotiations for the formation of a coalition government. The coalition was put into effect on 30 March 1938. As a result, the second Josef Hoop cabinet was succeeded, now containing several members of both parties.

The following day, Franz I made Franz Joseph his regent and then moved to a family-owned estate in Feldberg, Czechoslovakia. He later died on 25 July while at one of his family's castles, Castle Feldberg, with Franz Joseph formally succeeding him. Although Franz stated that he had given the regency to Franz Joseph due to his old age, it was speculated that he did not wish to remain in control of the principality if Nazi Germany were to invade, primarily because his wife Elsa was of Jewish relation.

Starting from 1938, the cabinet was faced with the challenge of pressure to transfer the Ellhorn mountain to Switzerland. Though Hoop was supportive of the transfer, he argued that the country should be fairly compensated for the loss of territory, such as the transfer of Swiss land elsewhere or greater banking cooperation between the two countries. The proposition faced resistance from the residents in Balzers, and was not approved by Franz Joseph II. Also facing unofficial objections from Nazi Germany, Hoop was forced to end the negotiations with Switzerland.

A compromise in the coalition agreement was to introduce a proportional representation to the country, despite it being rejected via referendum three years prior. It was introduced unanimously on 18 January 1939. On 11 March 1939 Franz Joseph, in agreement with both parties, disbanded the Landtag and called for early elections. The 1939 Liechtenstein general election was not made public due to the country being under threat from Nazi Germany. It became known as the "silent election" as no voting actually took place; instead, the Progressive Citizen's Party and Patriotic Union used it to assign roughly an equal number of seats to each other in order to prevent the German National Movement in Liechtenstein (VBDL) from gaining any seats in the Landtag. As a result, the Hoop cabinet was now made out of several members of both parties. The government was placed under threat when the VBDL attempted a coup in March 1939, first trying to provoke an intervention from Nazi Germany by burning swastikas, followed by declaring Liechtenstein's annexation into Germany. The leaders were almost immediately arrested and the planned German invasion failed to materialise.

During World War II, Liechtenstein remained neutral. Hoop's government considered non-binding, non-provocative diplomacy to be appropriate towards Nazi Germany, supplemented by courtesy gestures. In 1940, during a lecture in Stuttgart, Hoop showed respect for the German armies. At the same time, the country tied itself as closely as possible to Switzerland during the war in hopes of retaining the country's neutrality. It achieved the de facto inclusion of Liechtenstein in the Swiss national supply.

At the request of Franz Joseph II on 9 November 1944, the cabinet was dissolved and succeeded by the Fourth Josef Hoop cabinet.

== Members ==
Picture	Name	Term	Party
Prime Minister
	Josef Hoop	30 March 1938 – 9 November 1944	Progressive Citizens' Party
Deputy Prime Minister
	Alois Vogt	30 March 1938 – 9 November 1944	Patriotic Union
Government councillors
	Anton Frommelt	30 March 1938 – 9 November 1944	Progressive Citizens' Party
	Arnold Hoop	30 March 1938 – 27 December 1940	Patriotic Union
	Johann Georg Hasler	13 August 1941 – 9 November 1944	Patriotic Union

== See also ==
- Politics of Liechtenstein

== Bibliography ==
- Geiger, Peter (1997). Liechtenstein in den Dreissigerjahren 1928–1939 (in German) (1st ed.). Zürich: Liechtenstein Institute. ISBN 3-906393-28-3.
- Nohlen, Dieter; Stöver, Philip (2010). Elections in Europe: A data handbook. Nomos. ISBN 978-3-8329-5609-7.
- Vogt, Paul (1987). 125 Jahre Landtag (in German). Vaduz: Landtag of the Principality of Liechtenstein.
