= Fourth Josef Hoop cabinet =

Governing body of Liechtenstein (1944–1945)

- Government of Liechtenstein

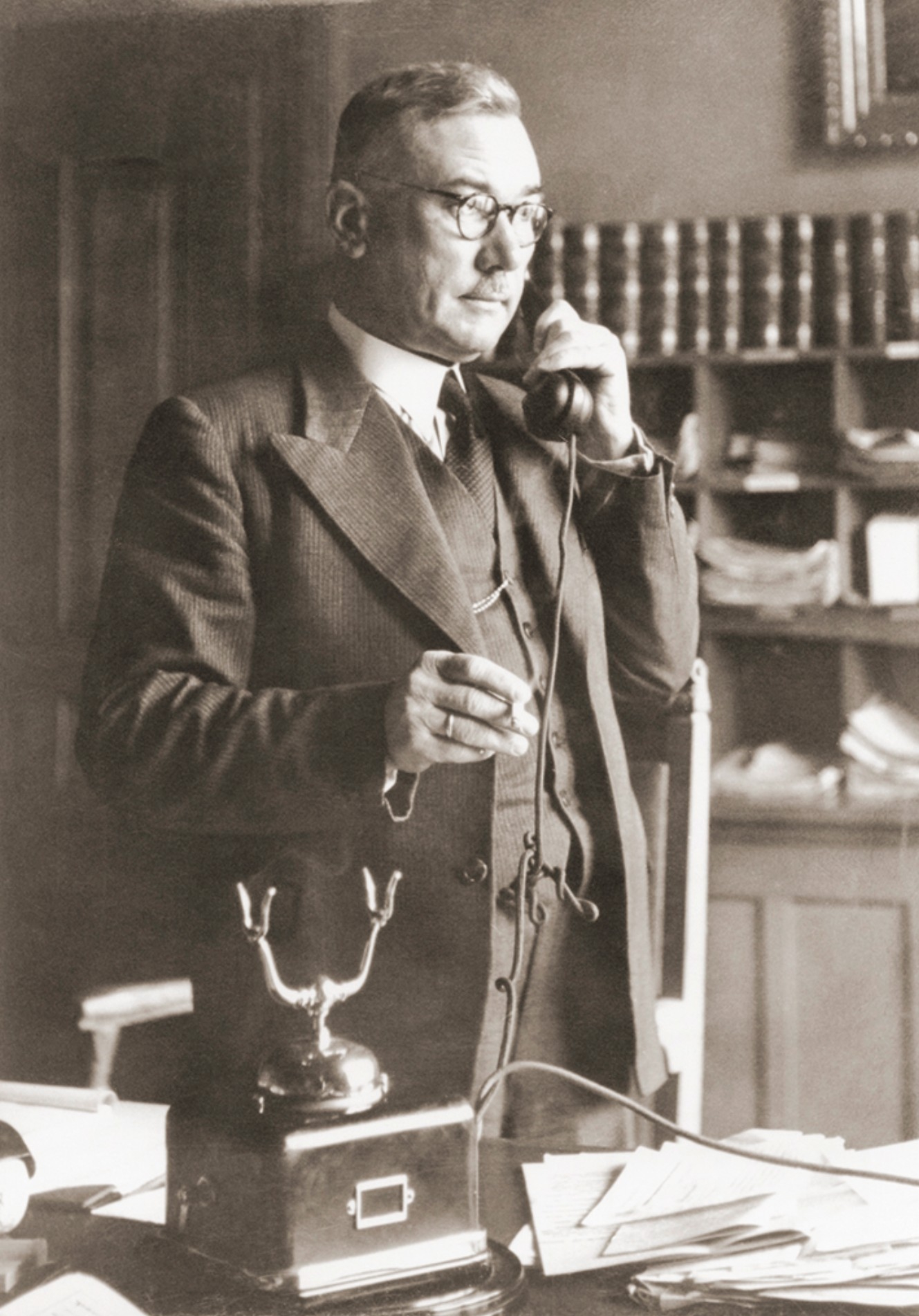
- Date formed: 9 November 1944
- Date dissolved: 3 September 1945

People and organisations
- Head of state: Franz Joseph II
- Head of government: Josef Hoop
- Deputy head of government: Alois Vogt
- Total no. of members: 4
- Member parties: FBP; VU
- Status in legislature: Coalition

History
- Election: 1945
- Predecessor: Third Josef Hoop cabinet
- Successor: First Alexander Frick cabinet

The fourth Josef Hoop cabinet was the governing body of Liechtenstein from 9 November 1944 to 3 September 1945. It was appointed by Franz Joseph II and chaired by Josef Hoop.

== History ==
At the request of Franz Joseph II on 9 November 1944, the Third Josef Hoop cabinet was dissolved and succeeded with Josef Hoop continuing as Prime Minister of Liechtenstein. Elections were not conducted in 1944 due to ongoing threat from Nazi Germany but the cabinet was reformed regardless. The coalition government between the Progressive Citizens' Party and Patriotic Union parties continued. After World War II came to an end, the 1945 Liechtenstein general election was held which resulted in a win for the Progressive Citizens' Party.

Hoop resigned as prime minister in September 1945. He formally did this due to his worsening heart condition and his desire to move on from the role, but also remarked that Franz Joseph II had pressured him to do so as he believed that the vision of a post-war Liechtenstein required a change in leadership due to the ongoing diplomatic crisis with the pro-axis First Russian National Army and pro-emperor Vladimir White emigres led by General Boris Smyslovsky that had taken refuge in the country a few months prior. This de facto dismissal of Hoop angered many within the Progressive Citizens' Party. The cabinet was disbanded and was succeeded by Alexander Frick in the First Alexander Frick cabinet.

== Members ==
| Picture | Name | Term | Party |
Prime Minister
| | Josef Hoop | 9 November 1944 – 3 September 1945 | Progressive Citizens' Party |
Deputy Prime Minister
| | Alois Vogt | 9 November 1944 – 3 September 1945 | Patriotic Union |
Government councillors
| | Anton Frommelt | 9 November 1944 – 3 September 1945 | Progressive Citizens' Party |
| | Johann Georg Hasler | 9 November 1944 – 3 September 1945 | Patriotic Union |

== See also ==
- Politics of Liechtenstein
