= List of heads of government of Liechtenstein =

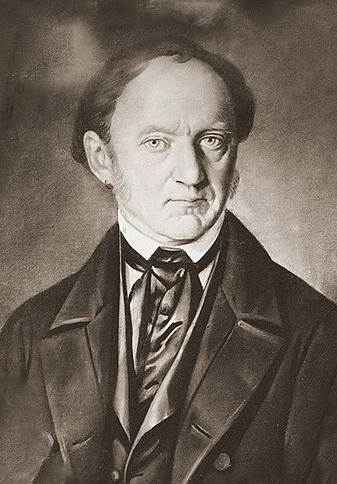
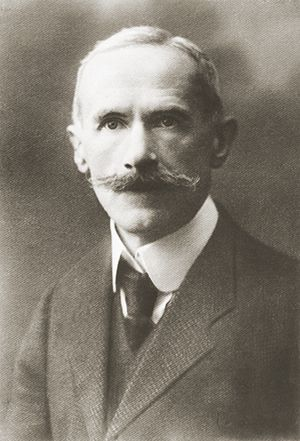
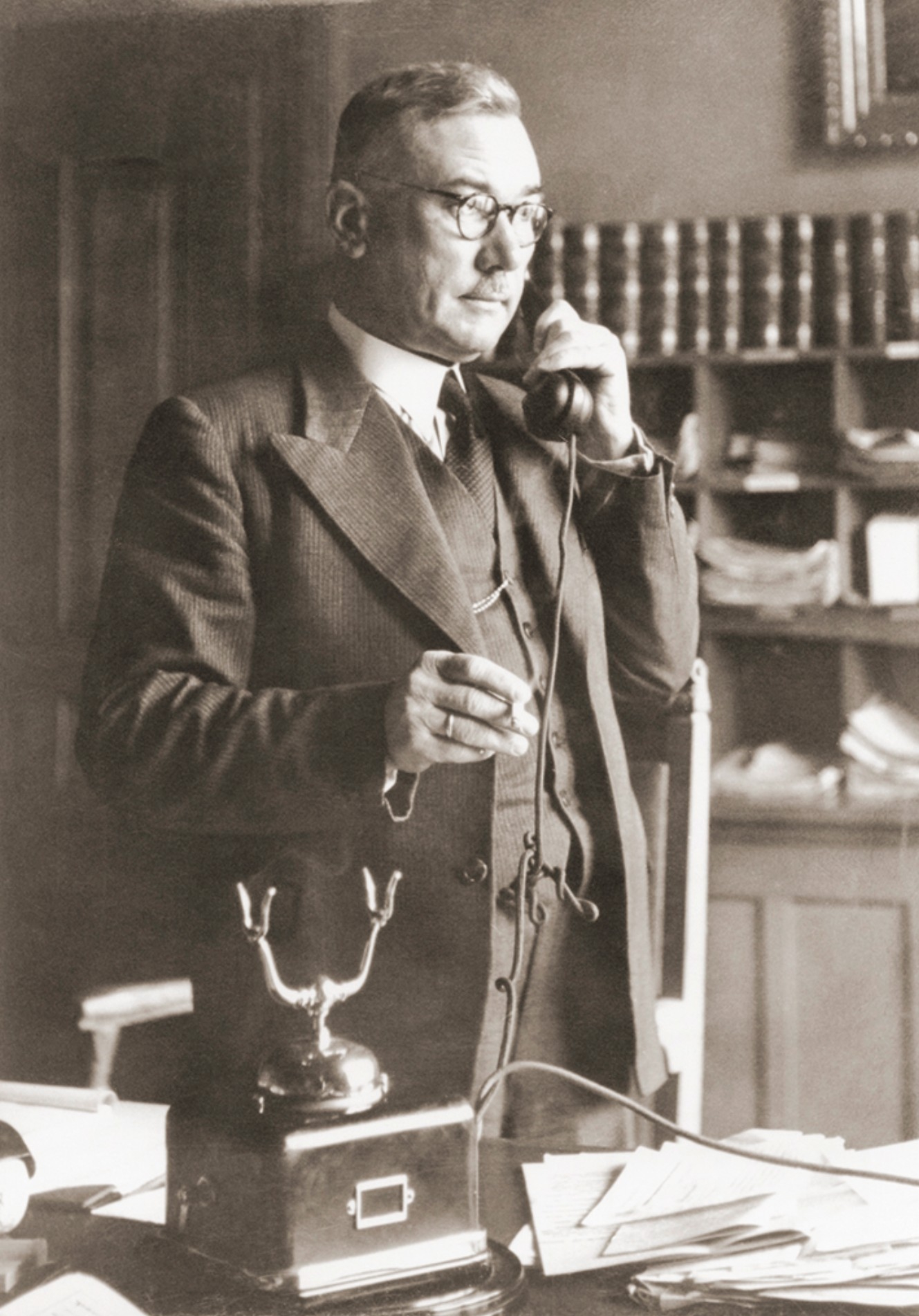
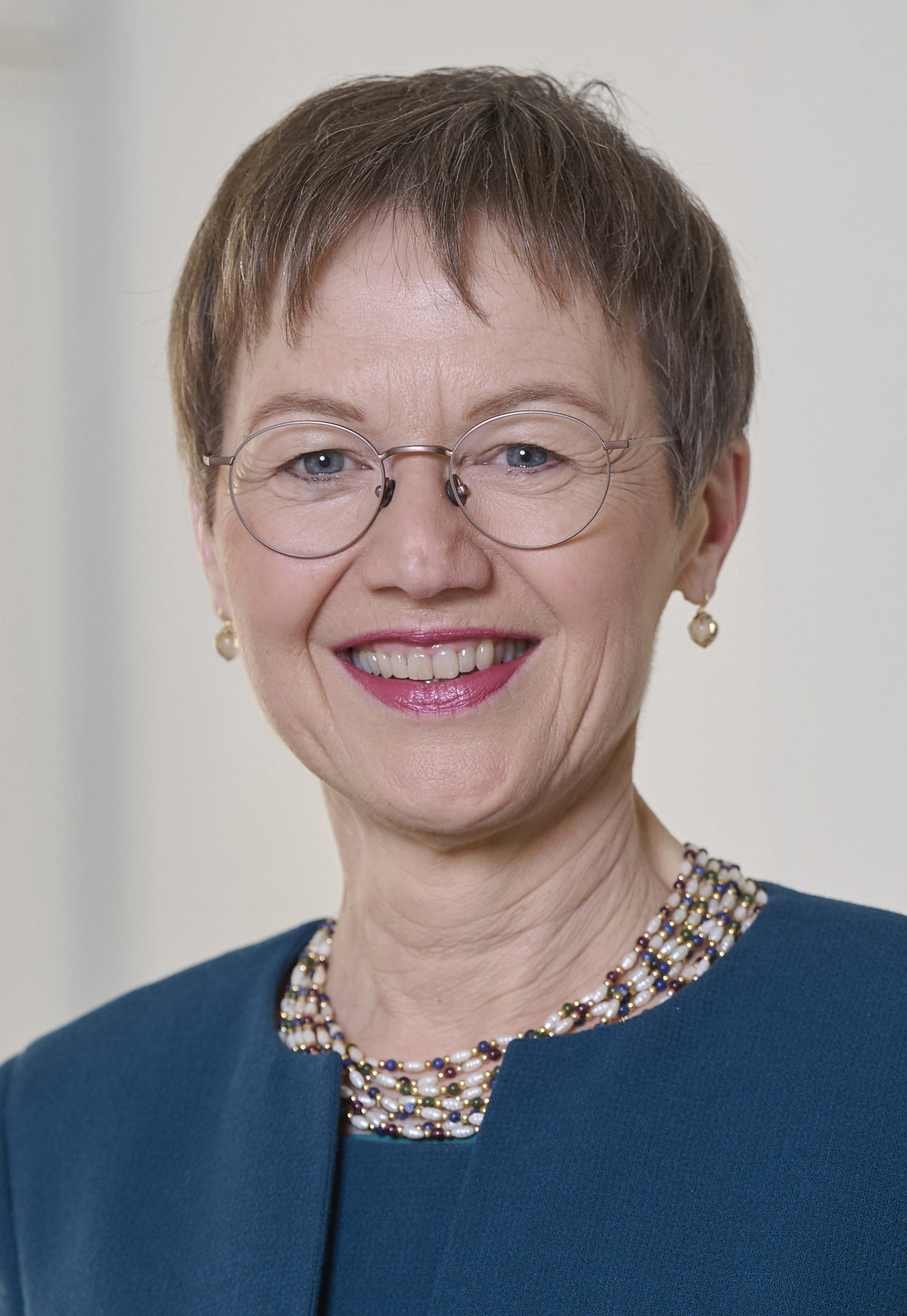
- Top left: Michael Menzinger is considered the first governor of Liechtenstein.
- Top right: Leopold Freiherr von Imhof was governor during World War I.
- Bottom left: Josef Hoop was the longest-serving prime minister and held the office during World War II.
- Bottom right: Brigitte Haas is the incumbent and first female prime minister.

The head of government of Liechtenstein (German: Regierungschef von Liechtenstein), known informally as the prime minister, is the chief executive of the government of Liechtenstein and chairs the cabinet of Liechtenstein. They are appointed by the sovereign prince of Liechtenstein with the consent of the Landtag of Liechtenstein (parliament of Liechtenstein) and are expected to command the confidence of both the prince and the Landtag. The appointed head of government is typically the leader of the political party with the most seats in the Landtag or a coalition of parties. The head of government cannot be a member of the Landtag at the same time, although they should meet the eligibility requirements for that office.

The position originated as Landvogt in the 14th century. The role functioned as the head of the district office (Oberamt), subordinate to the court of House of Liechtenstein. It was originally an undesired post within the court; this changed after Michael Menzinger applied for the role in 1833. The title was changed to governor (Landesverweser) as a concession following the Revolution of 1848 in Liechtenstein and was formalized upon the ratification of the 1862 constitution of Liechtenstein on 26 September. For this reason, Menzinger is considered the first governor of Liechtenstein. In 1921, a new constitution was ratified in which the office was replaced by that of the prime minister. Under this constitution, the eligibility for becoming head of government was changed to require being natural-born in Liechtenstein. However, this requirement has been considered inactive since 1992.

The incumbent prime minister has been Brigitte Haas since 10 April 2025. There are currently six living former prime ministers, with Walter Kieber being the most recent death, in 2014.

== Head of government ==
=== Political parties ===
Independent Progressive Citizens' Party (FBP) Christian-Social People's Party (VP) (Note: The Christian-Social People's Party and the Liechtenstein Homeland Service merged to form the Patriotic Union in 1936.) Patriotic Union (VU)

=== State administrator (1861–1921) ===
The Landesverweser (transl. State administrator), also known as 'Governor', was the title of the head of government from 1848 to 1921.

No. (Note: People are numbered according to periods served by the same person. For example, Carl von In der Maur served as state administrator twice in two non-consecutive terms, but is counted only once.)	Portrait	Name (Birth–Death)	Term of office			Party	Cabinet	Prince (Reign)
No.	Portrait	Name (Birth–Death)	Took office	Left office	Duration	Party	Cabinet	Prince (Reign)
1	A photograph of Michael Menzinger in 1845.	Michael Menzinger (1792–1877)	22 March 1833	15 March 1861	27 years, 358 days	Independent	—	Aloys II (1836–1858)
1	A photograph of Michael Menzinger in 1845.	Michael Menzinger (1792–1877)	22 March 1833	15 March 1861	27 years, 358 days	Independent	—	Johann II (1858–1929)
2	An undated photograph of Karl Freiherr Haus von Hausen.	Karl Freiherr Haus von Hausen (1823–1889)	April; 1861	23 September 1884	23 years, 5 months	Independent	Hausen	Johann II (1858–1929)
3	A photograph of Carl von In der Maur between 1912 and 1913.	Carl von In der Maur (1852–1913)	23 September 1884	5 September 1892	7 years, 348 days	Independent	In der Maur I	Johann II (1858–1929)
4	An undated photograph of Friedrich Stellwag von Carion.	Friedrich Stellwag von Carion (1852–1896)	5 September 1892	24 October 1896	4 years, 49 days	Independent	Carion	Johann II (1858–1929)
(3)	A photograph of Carl von In der Maur between 1912 and 1913.	Carl von In der Maur (1852–1913)	4 January 1897	11 December 1913	16 years, 341 days	Independent	In der Maur II	Johann II (1858–1929)
—	A photograph of Josef Ospelt in 1921.	Josef Ospelt (1881–1962); Acting	11 December 1913	1 April 1914	111 days	Independent	—	Johann II (1858–1929)
5	A photograph of Leopold Freiherr von Imhof in 1918.	Leopold Freiherr von Imhof (1869–1922)	1 April 1914	13 November 1918	4 years, 226 days	Independent	Imhof	Johann II (1858–1929)
—	An undated photograph of Martin Ritter.	Martin Ritter (1872–1947); Chairman of the Provisional Executive Committee	7 November 1918	7 December 1918	30 days	Christian-Social People's Party	Provisional Executive Committee	Johann II (1858–1929)
6		Prince Karl Aloys of Liechtenstein (1878–1955)	13 December 1918	15 September 1920	2 years, 2 days	Independent	Prince Karl Aloys	Johann II (1858–1929)
7	An undated photograph of Josef Peer.	Josef Peer (1864–1925)	15 September 1920	23 March 1921	189 days	Independent	Peer	Johann II (1858–1929)
8	A photograph of Josef Ospelt in 1921.	Josef Ospelt (1881–1962)	23 March 1921	5 October 1921	196 days	Progressive Citizens' Party	Ospelt	Johann II (1858–1929)

=== Prime Minister (1921–present) ===
The Regierungschef (lit. 'head of government') is the current title for the head of government. The office replaced that of State Administrator upon the ratification of the constitution of Liechtenstein on 5 October 1921.

No.	Portrait	Name (Birth–Death)	Term of office			Election	Party	Cabinet	Prince (Reign)
No.	Portrait	Name (Birth–Death)	Took office	Left office	Duration	Election	Party	Cabinet	Prince (Reign)
1	A photograph of Josef Ospelt in 1921.	Josef Ospelt (1881–1962)	5 October 1921	4 May 1922	211 days	—	Progressive Citizens' Party	Ospelt	Johann II (1858–1929)
—	A photograph of Alfons Feger in 1910.	Alfons Feger (1856–1933); Acting	4 May 1922	1 June 1922	28 days	—	Christian-Social People's Party	—	Johann II (1858–1929)
—	An undated photograph of Felix Gubelmann.	Felix Gubelmann (1880–1929); Acting	1 June 1922	6 June 1922	5 days	—	Progressive Citizens' Party	—	Johann II (1858–1929)
2	An undated photograph of Gustav Schädler.	Gustav Schädler (1883–1961)	10 June 1922	24 June 1928	6 years, 16 days	1922 Jan; 1926 Apr; 1926	Christian-Social People's Party	Schädler	Johann II (1858–1929)
—	A photograph of Prince Alfred of Liechtenstein in 1910.	Prince Alfred of Liechtenstein (1875–1930); Acting	24 June 1928	4 August 1928	39 days	—	Independent	—	Johann II (1858–1929)
3	A photograph of Josef Hoop in 1945.	Josef Hoop (1895–1959)	4 August 1928	3 September 1945	17 years, 30 days	1928 1930 1932	Progressive Citizens' Party	Hoop I	Johann II (1858–1929)
3	A photograph of Josef Hoop in 1945.	Josef Hoop (1895–1959)	4 August 1928	3 September 1945	17 years, 30 days	1928 1930 1932	Progressive Citizens' Party	Hoop I	Franz I (1929–1938)
3	A photograph of Josef Hoop in 1945.	Josef Hoop (1895–1959)	4 August 1928	3 September 1945	17 years, 30 days	1936	Progressive Citizens' Party	Hoop II	Franz I (1929–1938)
3	A photograph of Josef Hoop in 1945.	Josef Hoop (1895–1959)	4 August 1928	3 September 1945	17 years, 30 days	— 1939	Progressive Citizens' Party	Hoop III	Franz I (1929–1938)
3	A photograph of Josef Hoop in 1945.	Josef Hoop (1895–1959)	4 August 1928	3 September 1945	17 years, 30 days	— 1939	Progressive Citizens' Party	Hoop III	Franz Josef II (1938–1989)
3	A photograph of Josef Hoop in 1945.	Josef Hoop (1895–1959)	4 August 1928	3 September 1945	17 years, 30 days	— 1945	Progressive Citizens' Party	Hoop IV	Franz Josef II (1938–1989)
4	A photograph of Alexander Frick in 1954.	Alexander Frick (1910–1991)	3 September 1945	16 July 1962	16 years, 316 days	— 1949	Progressive Citizens' Party	Frick I	Franz Josef II (1938–1989)
4	A photograph of Alexander Frick in 1954.	Alexander Frick (1910–1991)	3 September 1945	16 July 1962	16 years, 316 days	— Feb; 1953 Jun; 1953 1957	Progressive Citizens' Party	Frick II	Franz Josef II (1938–1989)
4	A photograph of Alexander Frick in 1954.	Alexander Frick (1910–1991)	3 September 1945	16 July 1962	16 years, 316 days	— 1958 1962	Progressive Citizens' Party	Frick III	Franz Josef II (1938–1989)
5	A photograph of Gerard Batliner between 1962 and 1970.	Gerard Batliner (1928–2008)	16 July 1962	18 March 1970	7 years, 245 days	—	Progressive Citizens' Party	Batliner I	Franz Josef II (1938–1989)
5	A photograph of Gerard Batliner between 1962 and 1970.	Gerard Batliner (1928–2008)	16 July 1962	18 March 1970	7 years, 245 days	— 1966	Progressive Citizens' Party	Batliner II	Franz Josef II (1938–1989)
5	A photograph of Gerard Batliner between 1962 and 1970.	Gerard Batliner (1928–2008)	16 July 1962	18 March 1970	7 years, 245 days	—	Progressive Citizens' Party	Batliner III	Franz Josef II (1938–1989)
6	A photograph of Alfred Hilbe in 1974.	Alfred Hilbe (1928–2011)	18 March 1970	27 March 1974	4 years, 9 days	1970	Patriotic Union	Hilbe	Franz Josef II (1938–1989)
7	A photograph of Walter Kieber in 1975.	Walter Kieber (1931–2014)	27 March 1974	26 April 1978	4 years, 30 days	1974	Progressive Citizens' Party	Kieber	Franz Josef II (1938–1989)
8	A photograph of Hans Brunhart in 1991.	Hans Brunhart (born 1945)	26 April 1978	26 May 1993	15 years, 30 days	1978	Patriotic Union	Brunhart I	Franz Josef II (1938–1989)
8	A photograph of Hans Brunhart in 1991.	Hans Brunhart (born 1945)	26 April 1978	26 May 1993	15 years, 30 days	1982	Patriotic Union	Brunhart II	Franz Josef II (1938–1989)
8	A photograph of Hans Brunhart in 1991.	Hans Brunhart (born 1945)	26 April 1978	26 May 1993	15 years, 30 days	1986	Patriotic Union	Brunhart III	Franz Josef II (1938–1989)
8	A photograph of Hans Brunhart in 1991.	Hans Brunhart (born 1945)	26 April 1978	26 May 1993	15 years, 30 days	1989	Patriotic Union	Brunhart IV	Franz Josef II (1938–1989)
8	A photograph of Hans Brunhart in 1991.	Hans Brunhart (born 1945)	26 April 1978	26 May 1993	15 years, 30 days	1989	Patriotic Union	Brunhart IV	Hans-Adam II (1989–present)
9	A photograph of Markus Büchel in 1993.	Markus Büchel (1959–2013)	26 May 1993	15 December 1993	203 days	Feb; 1993	Progressive Citizens' Party	Büchel	Hans-Adam II (1989–present)
10		Mario Frick (born 1965)	15 December 1993	5 April 2001	7 years, 111 days	Oct; 1993	Patriotic Union	Frick I	Hans-Adam II (1989–present)
10		Mario Frick (born 1965)	15 December 1993	5 April 2001	7 years, 111 days	1997	Patriotic Union	Frick II	Hans-Adam II (1989–present)
11	Otmar Hasler's official prime minister photograph, between 2001 and 2009.	Otmar Hasler (born 1953)	5 April 2001	25 March 2009	7 years, 354 days	2001	Progressive Citizens' Party	O. Hasler I	Hans-Adam II (1989–present)
11	Otmar Hasler's official prime minister photograph, between 2001 and 2009.	Otmar Hasler (born 1953)	5 April 2001	25 March 2009	7 years, 354 days	2005	Progressive Citizens' Party	O. Hasler II	Hans-Adam II (1989–present)
12	Klaus Tschütscher's official prime minister photograph, 2009.	Klaus Tschütscher (born 1967)	25 March 2009	27 March 2013	4 years, 2 days	2009	Patriotic Union	Tschütscher	Hans-Adam II (1989–present)
13	Adrian Hasler's official prime minister photograph, 2017.	Adrian Hasler (born 1964)	27 March 2013	25 March 2021	7 years, 363 days	2013	Progressive Citizens' Party	A. Hasler I	Hans-Adam II (1989–present)
13	Adrian Hasler's official prime minister photograph, 2017.	Adrian Hasler (born 1964)	27 March 2013	25 March 2021	7 years, 363 days	2017	Progressive Citizens' Party	A. Hasler II	Hans-Adam II (1989–present)
14	Daniel Risch's official prime minister photograph, 2021.	Daniel Risch (born 1978)	25 March 2021	10 April 2025	4 years, 16 days	2021	Patriotic Union	Risch	Hans-Adam II (1989–present)
15	Brigitte Haas's official prime minister photograph, 2025.	Brigitte Haas (born 1964)	10 April 2025	Incumbent	1 year, 123 days	2025	Patriotic Union	Haas	Hans-Adam II (1989–present)

== Deputy head of government ==
The deputy head of government is the secondary chief executive in Liechtenstein. One of the government councillors is appointed to the position by the prince of Liechtenstein upon the proposal of the Landtag of Liechtenstein.

No.	Portrait	Name (Birth–Death)	Term of office			Party	Prime Minister		Cabinet
No.	Portrait	Name (Birth–Death)	Took office	Left office	Duration	Party	Name (Tenure)	Party	Cabinet
1	A photograph of Alfons Feger in 1908.	Alfons Feger (1856–1933)	2 March 1922	24 June 1928	7 years, 114 days	Christian-Social People's Party	Josef Ospelt (1921–1922)	Progressive Citizens' Party	Ospelt
1	A photograph of Alfons Feger in 1908.	Alfons Feger (1856–1933)	2 March 1922	24 June 1928	7 years, 114 days	Christian-Social People's Party	Alfons Feger (1922); Acting	Christian-Social People's Party	—
1	A photograph of Alfons Feger in 1908.	Alfons Feger (1856–1933)	2 March 1922	24 June 1928	7 years, 114 days	Christian-Social People's Party	Felix Gubelmann (1922); Acting	Progressive Citizens' Party	—
1	A photograph of Alfons Feger in 1908.	Alfons Feger (1856–1933)	2 March 1922	24 June 1928	7 years, 114 days	Christian-Social People's Party	Gustav Schädler (1922–1928)	Christian-Social People's Party	Schädler
Vacant (24 June – 4 August 1928)							Prince Alfred of Liechtenstein (1928); Acting	Independent	—
2	A photograph of Ludwig Marxer in 1938.	Ludwig Marxer (1897–1962)	4 August 1928	20 June 1933	4 years, 320 days	Progressive Citizens' Party	Josef Hoop (1928–1945)	Progressive Citizens' Party	Hoop I
3	A photograph of Anton Frommelt in 1938.	Anton Frommelt (1895–1975)	20 June 1933	30 March 1938	4 years, 283 days	Progressive Citizens' Party	Josef Hoop (1928–1945)	Progressive Citizens' Party	Hoop I
3	A photograph of Anton Frommelt in 1938.	Anton Frommelt (1895–1975)	20 June 1933	30 March 1938	4 years, 283 days	Progressive Citizens' Party	Josef Hoop (1928–1945)	Progressive Citizens' Party	Hoop II
4	A photograph of Alois Vogt in 1945.	Alois Vogt (1906–1988)	30 March 1938	3 September 1945	7 years, 157 days	Patriotic Union	Josef Hoop (1928–1945)	Progressive Citizens' Party	Hoop III
4	A photograph of Alois Vogt in 1945.	Alois Vogt (1906–1988)	30 March 1938	3 September 1945	7 years, 157 days	Patriotic Union	Josef Hoop (1928–1945)	Progressive Citizens' Party	Hoop IV
5	A photograph of Ferdinand Nigg in 1925.	Ferdinand Nigg (1893–1957)	3 September 1945	13 July 1957	11 years, 313 days	Patriotic Union	Alexander Frick (1945–1962)	Progressive Citizens' Party	Frick I
5	A photograph of Ferdinand Nigg in 1925.	Ferdinand Nigg (1893–1957)	3 September 1945	13 July 1957	11 years, 313 days	Patriotic Union	Alexander Frick (1945–1962)	Progressive Citizens' Party	Frick II
6	A photograph of Josef Büchel in 1955.	Josef Büchel (1910–1991)	13 July 1957	16 June 1965	7 years, 338 days	Patriotic Union	Alexander Frick (1945–1962)	Progressive Citizens' Party	Frick II
6	A photograph of Josef Büchel in 1955.	Josef Büchel (1910–1991)	13 July 1957	16 June 1965	7 years, 338 days	Patriotic Union	Alexander Frick (1945–1962)	Progressive Citizens' Party	Frick III
6	A photograph of Josef Büchel in 1955.	Josef Büchel (1910–1991)	13 July 1957	16 June 1965	7 years, 338 days	Patriotic Union	Gerard Batliner (1962–1970)	Progressive Citizens' Party	Batliner I
7	A photograph of Alfred Hilbe in 1965.	Alfred Hilbe (1928–2011)	16 June 1965	18 March 1970	4 years, 275 days	Patriotic Union	Gerard Batliner (1962–1970)	Progressive Citizens' Party	Batliner II
7	A photograph of Alfred Hilbe in 1965.	Alfred Hilbe (1928–2011)	16 June 1965	18 March 1970	4 years, 275 days	Patriotic Union	Gerard Batliner (1962–1970)	Progressive Citizens' Party	Batliner III
8	A photograph of Walter Kieber in 1975.	Walter Kieber (1931–2014)	18 March 1970	27 March 1974	4 years, 9 days	Progressive Citizens' Party	Alfred Hilbe (1970–1974)	Patriotic Union	Hilbe
9	A photograph of Hans Brunhart in 1991.	Hans Brunhart (born 1945)	27 March 1974	26 April 1978	4 years, 30 days	Patriotic Union	Walter Kieber (1974–1978)	Progressive Citizens' Party	Kieber
(8)	A photograph of Walter Kieber in 1975.	Walter Kieber (1931–2014)	26 April 1978	1 July 1980	2 years, 66 days	Progressive Citizens' Party	Hans Brunhart (1978–1993)	Patriotic Union	Brunhart I
10	A photograph of Hilmar Ospelt in 1980.	Hilmar Ospelt (1929–2020)	1 July 1980	2 February 1986	5 years, 216 days	Progressive Citizens' Party	Hans Brunhart (1978–1993)	Patriotic Union	Brunhart I
10	A photograph of Hilmar Ospelt in 1980.	Hilmar Ospelt (1929–2020)	1 July 1980	2 February 1986	5 years, 216 days	Progressive Citizens' Party	Hans Brunhart (1978–1993)	Patriotic Union	Brunhart II
11	A photograph of Herbert Wille in 1986.	Herbert Wille (born 1944)	2 February 1986	26 May 1993	7 years, 113 days	Progressive Citizens' Party	Hans Brunhart (1978–1993)	Patriotic Union	Brunhart II
11	A photograph of Herbert Wille in 1986.	Herbert Wille (born 1944)	2 February 1986	26 May 1993	7 years, 113 days	Progressive Citizens' Party	Hans Brunhart (1978–1993)	Patriotic Union	Brunhart III
12		Mario Frick (born 1965)	26 May 1993	15 December 1993	203 days	Patriotic Union	Markus Büchel (1993)	Progressive Citizens' Party	Büchel
13		Thomas Büchel (born 1952)	15 December 1993	14 April 1997	3 years, 120 days	Progressive Citizens' Party	Mario Frick (1993–2001)	Patriotic Union	Frick I
14		Michael Ritter (born 1957)	14 April 1997	5 April 2001	3 years, 361 days	Patriotic Union	Mario Frick (1993–2001)	Patriotic Union	Frick II
15	A photograph of Rita Kieber-Beck in 2006.	Rita Kieber-Beck (born 1958)	5 April 2001	21 April 2005	4 years, 16 days	Progressive Citizens' Party	Otmar Hasler (2001–2009)	Progressive Citizens' Party	O. Hasler I
16	Klaus Tschütscher's official prime minister photograph, 2009.	Klaus Tschütscher (born 1967)	21 April 2005	25 March 2009	3 years, 338 days	Patriotic Union	Otmar Hasler (2001–2009)	Progressive Citizens' Party	O. Hasler II
17	A photograph of Martin Meyer in 2011.	Martin Meyer (born 1972)	25 March 2009	27 March 2013	4 years, 2 days	Progressive Citizens' Party	Klaus Tschütscher (2009–2013)	Patriotic Union	Tschütscher
18	A photograph of Thomas Zwiefelhofer in 2013.	Thomas Zwiefelhofer (born 1969)	27 March 2013	30 March 2017	4 years, 3 days	Patriotic Union	Adrian Hasler (2013–2021)	Progressive Citizens' Party	A. Hasler I
19	A photograph of Daniel Risch in 2017.	Daniel Risch (born 1978)	30 March 2017	25 March 2021	3 years, 360 days	Patriotic Union	Adrian Hasler (2013–2021)	Progressive Citizens' Party	A. Hasler II
20	Sabine Monauni's official portrait as deputy prime minister, 2025.	Sabine Monauni (born 1974)	25 March 2021	Incumbent	5 years, 139 days	Progressive Citizens' Party	Daniel Risch (2021–2025)	Patriotic Union	Risch
20	Sabine Monauni's official portrait as deputy prime minister, 2025.	Sabine Monauni (born 1974)	25 March 2021	Incumbent	5 years, 139 days	Progressive Citizens' Party	Brigitte Haas (since 2025)	Patriotic Union	Haas

== See also ==
- Politics of Liechtenstein
- List of monarchs of Liechtenstein
- List of Liechtenstein general elections
- List of cabinets of Liechtenstein
- Lists of office-holders
