= Friedrich Stellwag von Carion =

Governor of Liechtenstein from 1892 to 1896

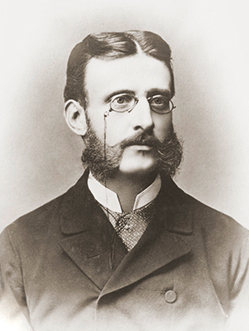

Governor of Liechtenstein
- In office 5 September 1892 – 24 October 1896
- Monarch: Johann II
- Preceded by: Carl von In der Maur
- Succeeded by: Carl von In der Maur

Personal details
- Born: 16 December 1852 Sibiu, Austrian Empire
- Died: 24 October 1896 (aged 43) Vienna, Austria-Hungary
- Party: Independent
- Spouse: Agathe Schiller
- Children: 3

Friedrich Stellwag von Carion (16 December 1852 – 24 October 1896) was an Austrian civil servant who served as the Governor of Liechtenstein from 1892 until his death in 1896.

== Austrian career ==
Stellwag von Carion was born on 16 December 1852, in Sibiu, then Austrian Empire, to the son of officer August Stellwag von Carion and Mara Maltzer. He came from the nobility in Lower Austria and he studied law and political science.

On 19 December 1876, he worked as a civil servant intern in Krems an der Donau. From 21 December 1881, he was became a lieutenant representative in Bruck an der Leitha and was district commissioner of the town from 11 November 1883. He was a lieutenant secretary in Vienna from 3 December 1889 until 1892.

== Governor of Liechtenstein ==
Stellwag von Carion was the Governor of Liechtenstein, serving from 5 September 1892 until his death on 24 October 1896. He was appointed to the role by Johann II following Carl von In der Maur leaving office when he was appointed Fürstlicher Kabinettsrat to Vienna.

During his time in office, the Liechtenstein state expedition took place in 1885. In 1894, there was a dispute between Stellwag von Carion and the Landtag of Liechtenstein regarding its powers, which led a temporary censorship of the Liechtensteiner Volksblatt. By doing this, he faced opposition by figures such as Albert Schädler. In In order to resolve the dispute, Johann II temporarily suspended the Landtag for four months and sent Carl von In der Maur to Vaduz back to broker a compromise.

Stellwag von Carion also participated in researching the history of Liechtenstein. He contributed to the formation of the Liechtenstein National Museum and arranged for the excavation of a Roman villa in Nendeln between 1893 and 1896, and the site of a Roman fort in Schaan.

=== Cabinet (1892–1896) ===
- Friedrich Stellwag von Carion – Landesverweser (Governor)
- Franz Josef Biedermann – Landrat (Unterland)
- Meinrad Ospelt – Landrat (Oberland)

== Personal life ==
Stellwag von Carion married Agathe Schiller and they had three children together.
