= Pfadfinder und Pfadfinderinnen Liechtensteins =

National Scouting and Guiding association of Liechtenstein

- Scouts and Guides of Liechtenstein
- Country: Liechtenstein
- Founded: 1931/1989
- Membership: 1,100
- President: Andreas Meier
- Affiliation: World Association of Girl Guides and Girl Scouts, World Organization of the Scout Movement
- Website http://www.scout.li

Pfadfinder und Pfadfinderinnen Liechtensteins (Scouts and Guides of Liechtenstein, PPL) is the national Scouting and Guiding association of Liechtenstein. Scouting in Liechtenstein started in 1931, and Guiding followed in 1932. The Boy Scouts became a member of the World Organization of the Scout Movement in 1933, and the Guides joined the World Association of Girl Guides and Girl Scouts in 1952. In 1989 both organizations merged and formed the present Pfadfinder und Pfadfinderinnen Liechtensteins. The PPL has about 1,100 members of both sexes and is organised in ten troops (799 Scouts and 312 Guides).

== History ==
Scouting in Liechtenstein began in Schaan in 1931 and Guiding started in Vaduz in 1932. The Scout Association became a member of the World Organization of the Scout Movement (WOSM) in 1933. The Girl Guides of Liechtenstein became a full member of the World Association of Girl Guides and Girl Scouts (WAGGGS) in 1952. At the end of World War II, Rangers and Rovers helped in refugee camps.

In 1953 the World Scout Conference took place in Vaduz and a special Scout stamp was issued for this event.

A first-aid-group for Scouts and Guides was founded in 1973. The Scouts and Guides have had their own shop since 1976 and in 1979, they started publishing a bimonthly magazine for leaders, which is called "KNOTEN". Co-operation between the Scout and the Guide Associations has increased since 1981, when joint activities were organized to celebrate the 50th Anniversary of the Scout Movement in Liechtenstein. In 1989, the two Associations merged and its official name now is "Pfadfinder und Pfadfinderinnen Liechtensteins". Prince Nikolaus of Liechtenstein and his sister, Princess Nora, are Honorary Members of the Movement.

In 2006 a Scout Camp was held in Schaan to celebrate 75 years of Scouting in Liechtenstein and 200 years independence of Liechtenstein. Scouts from Austria and South Tyrol took part in this camp.

== Programme ==
The Scout emblem incorporates the national colors of the flag of Liechtenstein. All members wear the same uniform. The Brownies and Cub Scouts branch has a yellow scarf, all others wear a blue and red scarf which also symbolizes the national colors.

Each division draws up its own program. Leaders organize various activities for all branches at local and national level and these are adapted to meet the requirements of the individual in the community.

The Association provides basic training for leaders of all age groups as well as additional courses on special subjects. Patrol leaders are trained at district level.

Members of the Association are involved in many community service projects. During Lent, Guides organize a Soup Day in most villages together with the Liechtenstein Lent Charity. In 1986 the Liechtenstein Scouts and Guides started a community development project in cooperation with the Egyptian Scout Federation. The aim of this "Palm Tree Project" in El Arish, Egypt was to establish a palm tree factory (which can process all parts of a palm tree including the dates) and therefore provide jobs for the inhabitants of the region. During this project, exchanges of Egyptian and Liechtenstein Boy Scouts and Girl Guides also took place.

Various outdoor activities also are organized during the annual programs of all branches. Attendance at international gatherings is encouraged and the number of members participating in international camps, seminars and training sessions is increasing.

The Association informs its members and the general public about its activities through the national press as well as through its bimonthly magazine "KNOTEN".

The PPL is organised in four age branches:

- Bienli/Wölfle (Brownies/Cub Scouts – ages 7 to 11)
- Pfadfinderinnen/Pfadfinder (Guides/Scouts – ages 11 to 15)
- Pionier (Pioneer – ages 15 to 18)
- Ranger/Rover (age 18 and older)

=== Scout Motto, Promise and Law ===
==== Brownies and Cub Scouts ====
Motto:

Unser Bestes!
Our best!

Promise:

Ich will mir Mühe geben, Gott und meine Familie gern zu haben,
unser Gesetz zu befolgen
und für alle ein guter Kamerad/eine gute Kameradin zu sein.
To the best of my ability I will love God and my family,
abide by our Law
and be a good comrade to everyone.

Law:

Ein Wolf/Bienle hält seine Augen offen und hilft allen.
Ich bin ein Wolf/Bienle –
Du bist ein Wolf/Bienle –
auf uns ist Verlass.
A Cub Scout/Brownie is observant and helps everyone.
I am a Cub Scout/Brownie –
you are a Cub Scout/Brownie –
we are reliable.

==== Other branches ====
Motto:

Allzeit bereit!
Be prepared!

Promise:

Ich verspreche, dass ich mit der Hilfe Gottes versuchen will,
mein Bestes für meine Mitmenschen und unser Land zu tun,
den Fürsten zu achten
und nach dem Pfadfinder/Innen-Gesetz zu leben.
I promise that with God's help I will try
and do my best for my fellow beings and our country,
to respect the Prince
and live according to the Scouts/Guides Law.

Law:

Als Pfadfinder/Pfadfinderin

suche ich meinen Weg zu Gott
bin ich aufrichtig
helfe ich, wo ich kann
überwinde ich Schwierigkeiten
entscheide ich und setze mich ein
bin ich zuverlässig
schütze ich Natur und Umwelt
bereite ich Freude
verstehe und achte ich andere
bin ich ein guter Freund /eine gute Freundin.

In Übereinstimmung mit diesem Gesetz
ergänze ich für mich und meine Gruppe:

(...)

As a Scout/Girl Guide

I seek my way to God
I am upright
help where I can
overcome difficulties
make decisions and take action
I am reliable
protect nature and the world around us
give pleasure
understand and respect others
I am a good friend.

In conformity with this Law
I amend as follows, for myself and my group:

(...)

The Pionier and the Ranger/Rover branches may formulate promise and law according to age.

==== Leaders ====
Promise:

Im Vertrauen auf die Hilfe Gottes
und in Treue zu Fürst und Vaterland verspreche ich,
gemäss dem Pfadfinder/Innen-Gesetz und den Statuten der "Pfadfinder und Pfadfinderinnen Liechtensteins"
die mir anvertraute Verantwortung als Führer/In zu übernehmen
und nach besten Kräften zu erfüllen.
With trust in God's help
and in loyalty to Prince and Country,
I promise according to the Scouts'/Guides' Law and the statutes of the "Scouts and Guides of Liechtenstein"
to accept, to the best of my ability
the responsibility entrusted to me as leader.

== Pfadfinder-Gilde Liechtenstein ==
This is the Old Scouts Guild of Liechtenstein. Pfadfinder-Gilde Liechtenstein is affiliated to International Scout and Guide Fellowship. The Adult Scout association works closely together with the Youth association. It was founded in 1953. There are strong ties to the Scout Fellowships of Switzerland, Austria and Germany.

== See also ==
- Alexander Frick
- Scouting in displaced persons camps
