= Second Josef Hoop cabinet =

Governing body of Liechtenstein (1936–1938)

- Government of Liechtenstein

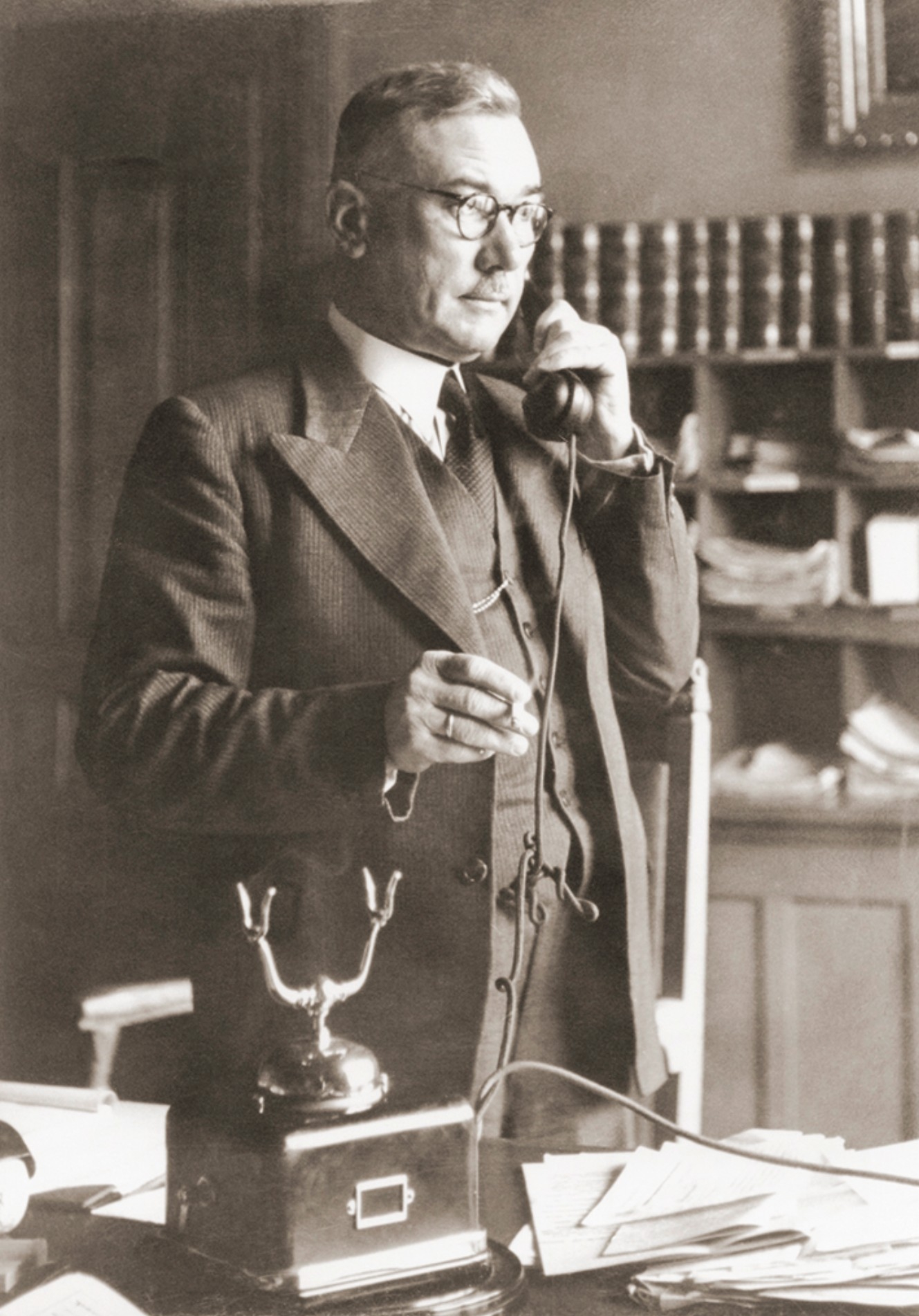
- Date formed: 28 February 1936
- Date dissolved: 30 March 1938

People and organisations
- Head of state: Franz I Franz Joseph (regent, 1938)
- Head of government: Josef Hoop
- Deputy head of government: Anton Frommelt
- Total no. of members: 5
- Member parties: FBP; VU
- Status in legislature: Majority

History
- Election: 1936
- Predecessor: First Josef Hoop cabinet
- Successor: Third Josef Hoop cabinet

The second Josef Hoop cabinet was the governing body of Liechtenstein from 28 February 1936 to 30 March 1938. It was appointed by Franz I and chaired by Josef Hoop.

== History ==
The 1936 Liechtenstein general election resulted in a win for the Progressive Citizens' Party, and the first Josef Hoop cabinet was succeeded, with Josef Hoop continuing as Prime Minister of Liechtenstein.

During the government's term, in January 1937, Liechtensteiner Vaterland, editor and founding member of the Liechtenstein Homeland Service Carl Freiherr von Vogelsang, publicly denounced Jews living in Liechtenstein. They sent numerous letters detailing them to officials in Nazi Germany. As a result, Hoop ordered the offices of the Vaterland to be searched for any letters to be confiscated, and Vogelsang promptly left the country. Most of the Landtag approved of Hoop's actions, but members of the Patriotic Union called for his resignation over the issue, believing the search to be unconstitutional. It was decided that two special judges would determine the legal implications of the case. Eventually, in July 1937, both judges concluded that Hoop had not acted unconstitutionally by ordering the search against Vogelsang and was subsequently legally acquitted of any wrongdoing.

Following the Anschluss of Austria in March 1938, Franz I named his nephew Franz Joseph his regent. The Progressive Citizens' Party and Patriotic Union formed a coalition government to prevent government deadlock and help retain Liechtenstein's neutrality, under the initiative of Franz Joseph II. As a result, the cabinet was dissolved and succeeded by the Third Josef Hoop cabinet.

== Members ==
Picture	Name	Term	Party
Prime Minister
	Josef Hoop	28 February 1936 – 30 March 1938	Progressive Citizens' Party
Deputy Prime Minister
	Anton Frommelt	28 February 1936 – 30 March 1938	Progressive Citizens' Party
Government councillors
	Peter Büchel	28 February 1936 – 30 March 1938	Progressive Citizens' Party
	Alois Schädler	28 February 1936 – 30 March 1938	Patriotic Union

== See also ==
- Politics of Liechtenstein
