= Ferdinand Nigg =

Deputy Prime Minister of Liechtenstein from 1945 to 1957

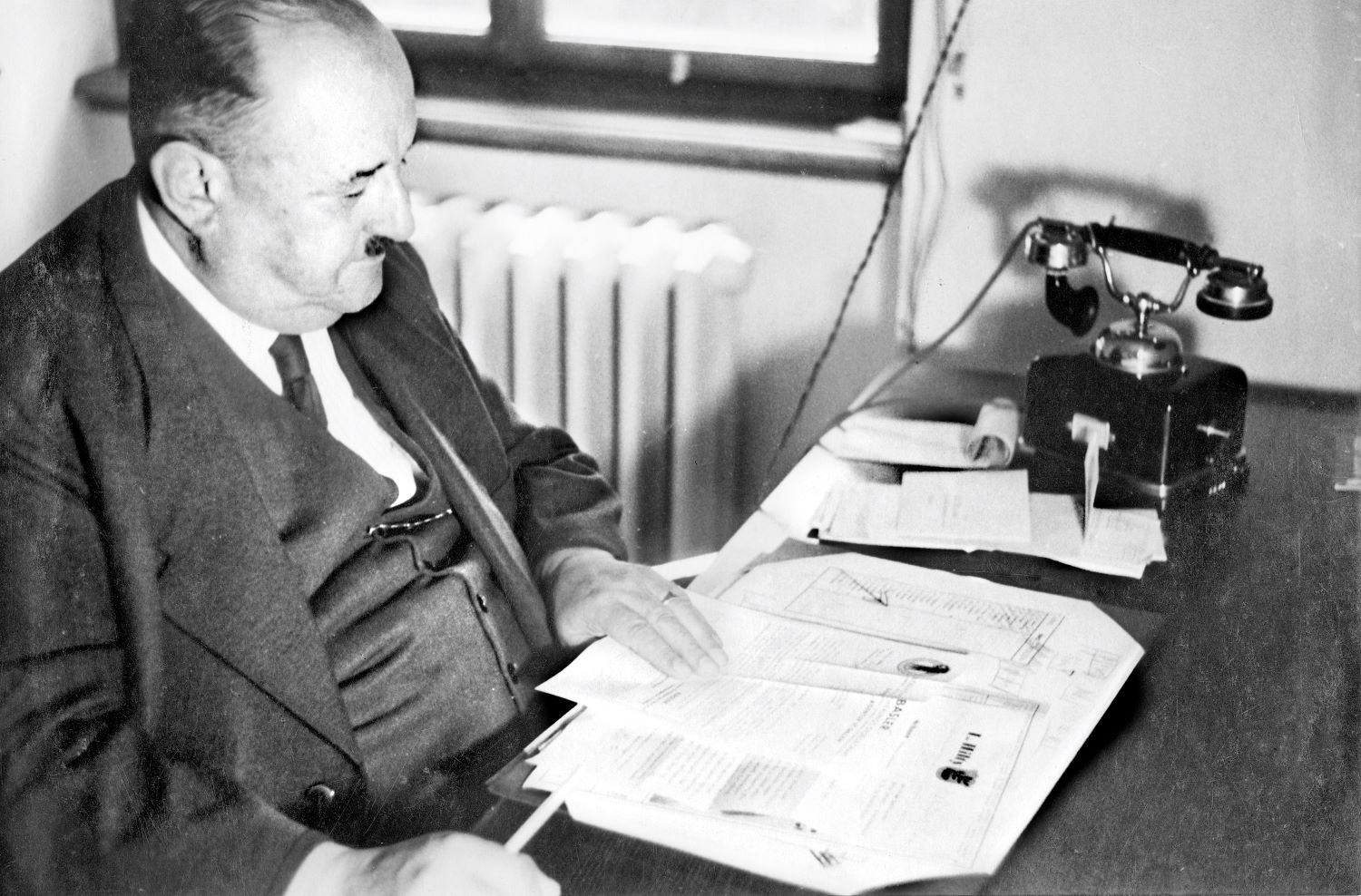
- Nigg in 1925

Deputy Prime Minister of Liechtenstein
- In office 3 September 1945 – 13 July 1957
- Monarch: Franz Joseph II
- Prime Minister: Alexander Frick
- Preceded by: Alois Vogt
- Succeeded by: Josef Büchel

Personal details
- Born: 31 October 1893 Vaduz, Liechtenstein
- Died: 13 July 1957 (aged 63) Vaduz, Liechtenstein
- Party: Patriotic Union
- Other political affiliations: Christian-Social People's Party
- Spouse: Rosa Burtscher (m. 1918)
- Children: 4

Ferdinand Nigg (/nɪɡ/, German: [ˈfɛɾdiːˌnant nɪk]; 31 October 1893 – 13 July 1957) was a politician from Liechtenstein who served as the Deputy Prime Minister of Liechtenstein from 1945 to 1957, under the government of Alexander Frick.

== Life ==
Nigg was born on 31 October 1893 in Vaduz as the son of a baker by the same name and his mother Baltissernée Celina as one of six children. He attended state school in the city.

From 1909 to 1911 Nigg worked at the Liechtenstein regional court, then from 1911 in the government chancellery. He became a chancellor in 1916 and then from 1920 head of the government chancellery. Nigg was involved in establishing an independent stamp policy in Liechtenstein, starting in 1919. He was initially aligned with the Progressive Citizens' Party, before becoming a member of the Christian-Social People's Party from 1920, then briefly the Liechtenstein Homeland Service, and finally the Patriotic Union when the two parties merged in 1936. He also headed the Intellectual Property Office and was an assistant district attorney from 1920 to 1945. As chairman of the livestock processing commission, he made a contribution to the eradication of bovine tuberculosis.

After the resignation of Josef Hoop in 1945, Nigg was appointed the Deputy Prime Minister of Liechtenstein, under the government of Alexander Frick. From 1942 to 1957 he was a librarian and from 1955 to 1957 secretary of the Historical Association for the Principality of Liechtenstein. He was also an honorary member of the Harmoniemusik Vaduz.

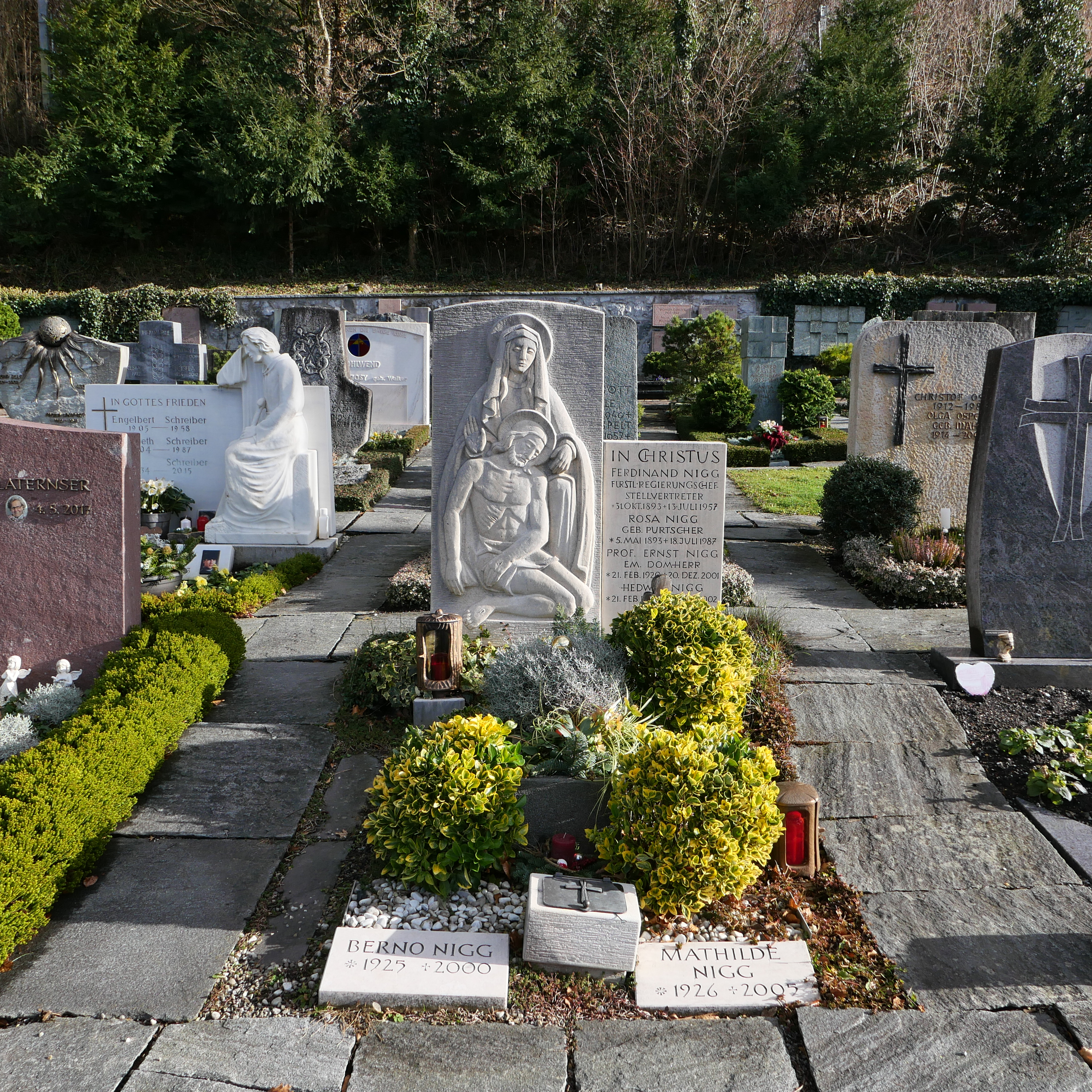
The family grave in 2024.

Nigg married Rosa Burtscher (5 May 1893 – 18 July 1987) on 9 September 1918 and they had four children together. He died of a heart attack on 13 July 1957, aged 63 years old.

== Honours ==
- Liechtenstein : Grand Star of the Order of Merit of the Principality of Liechtenstein.
