= Alois Vogt =

Deputy Prime Minister of Liechtenstein from 1938 to 1945

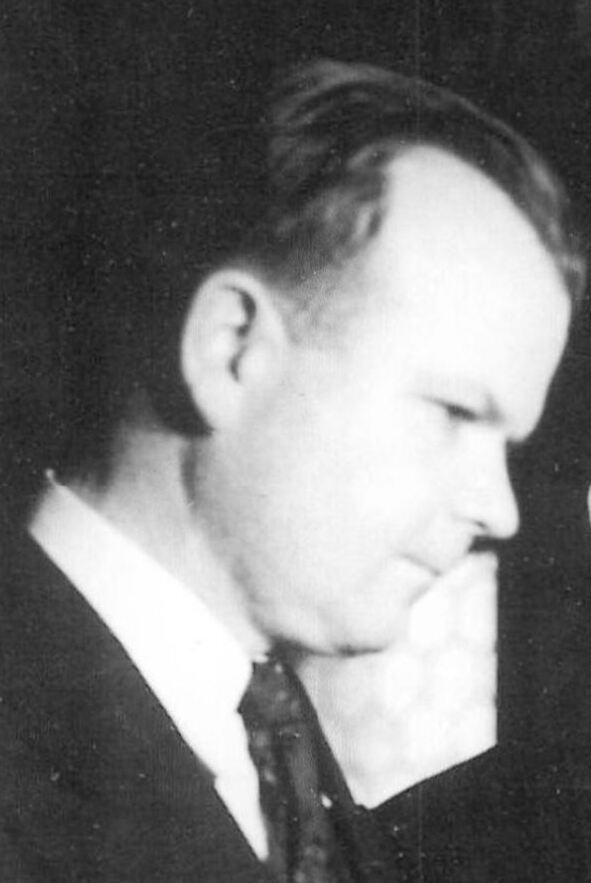
- Vogt in 1945

Deputy Prime Minister of Liechtenstein
- In office 30 March 1938 – 3 September 1945
- Monarchs: Franz I Franz Joseph II
- Prime Minister: Josef Hoop
- Preceded by: Anton Frommelt
- Succeeded by: Ferdinand Nigg

Member of the Landtag of Liechtenstein for Oberland
- In office 6 February 1949 – 6 February 1966

Personal details
- Born: 19 July 1906 Balzers, Liechtenstein
- Died: 23 March 1988 (aged 81) Vaduz, Liechtenstein
- Party: Patriotic Union
- Other political affiliations: Liechtenstein Homeland Service
- Spouse: Beate Hussak (m. 1948)
- Children: 6
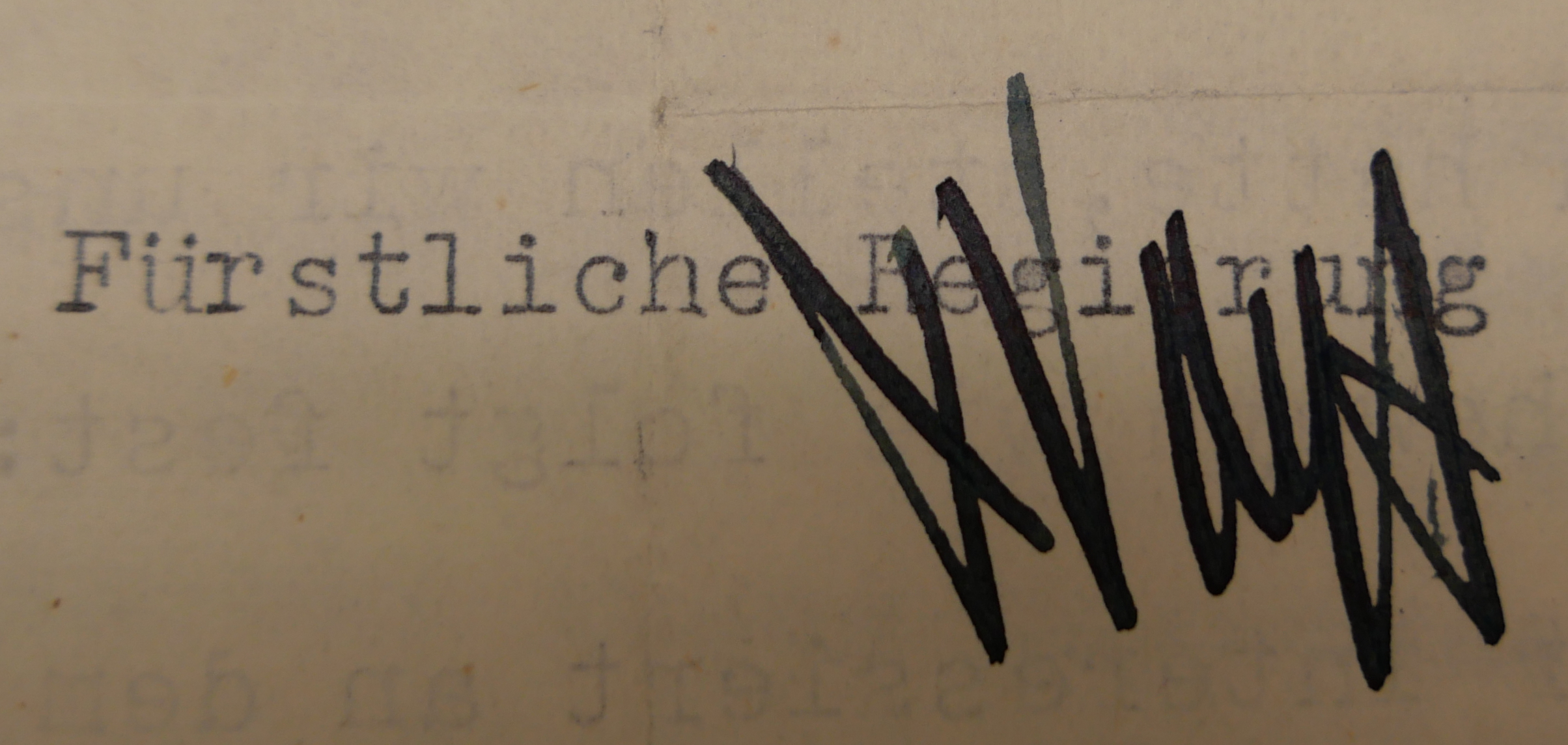
- Signature

Alois Vogt (19 July 1906 – 23 March 1988) was a lawyer and political figure from Liechtenstein who served as the Deputy Prime Minister of Liechtenstein from 1938 to 1945. He later served in the Landtag of Liechtenstein from 1949 to 1966.

== Early life ==
Vogt was born on 19 July 1906 in Balzers as the son of farmer Josef Kaspar and Magdalena Theresia Gstöhl as one of six children. He attended Realschule in Vaduz and from 1928 went on to study law in Innsbruck, Freiburg im Breisgau and Vienna, where he received a diploma in 1933. He proceeded to open his own law firm in Vaduz.

== Career ==
Vogt was a co-founder of the Liechtenstein Homeland Service in 1933. This party and the Christian-Social People's Party merged to form the Patriotic Union in 1936 and Vogt was placed as the party secretary. He was also the editor of the Liechtensteiner Vaterland from 1937 to 1938.

In 1937, he was the defending lawyer of Carl Freiherr von Vogelsang after he publicly denounced Jews living in Liechtenstein and sent numerous letters detailing them to officials in Nazi Germany. As a result, prime minister Josef Hoop ordered the offices of the Vaterland to be searched for any letters to be confiscated. Members of the Patriotic Union called for Hoop to resign over the issue, but he was later acquitted of any wrong-doing.

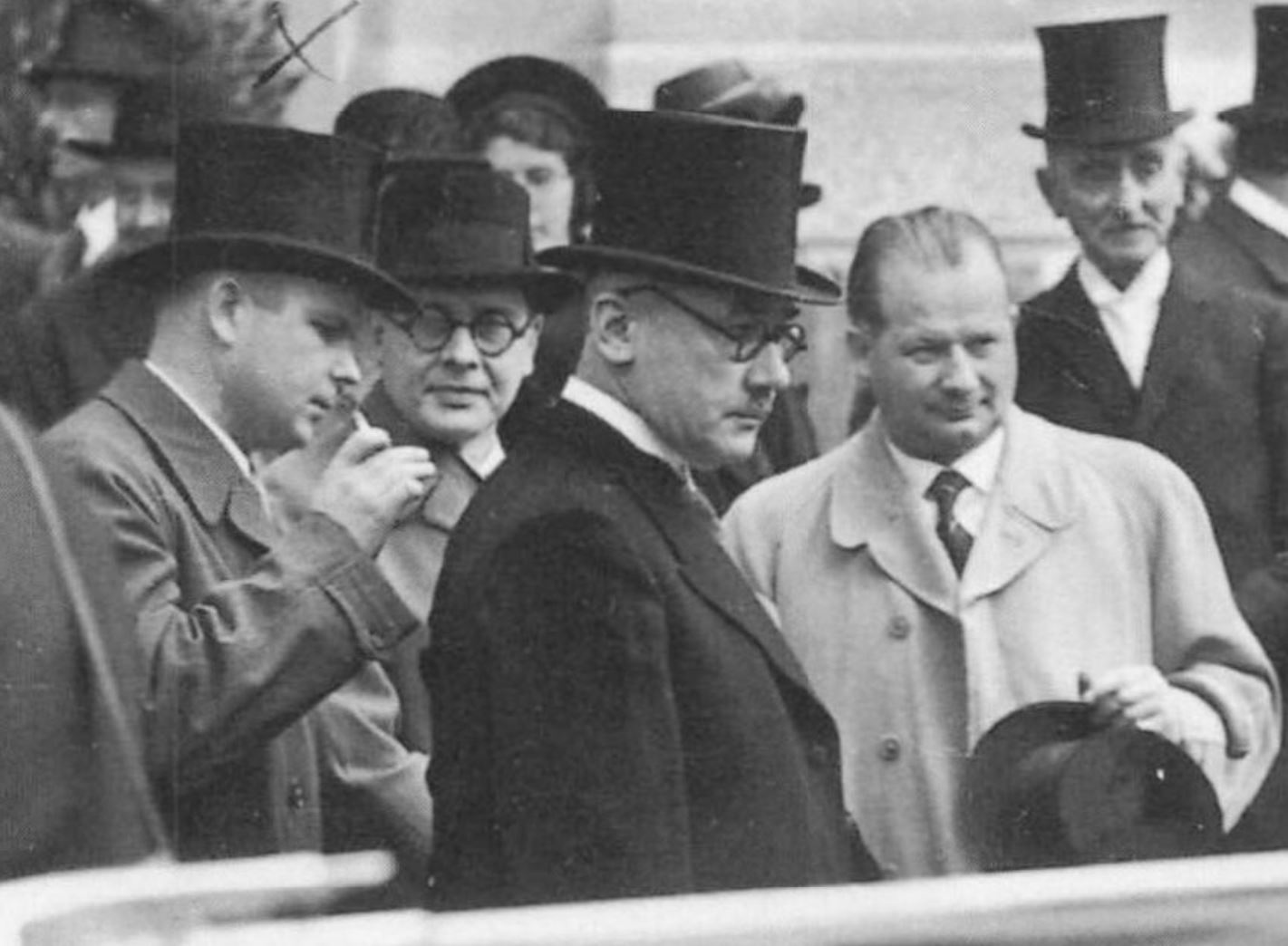
Vogt (left) with Otto Schaedler, Josef Hoop and Ludwig Marxer, around 1938.

In March 1938 the Patriotic Union entered a coalition government with the governing Progressive Citizens' Party. As a result, Vogt was appointed the Deputy Prime Minister of Liechtenstein under Josef Hoop, replacing Anton Frommelt. He served in the position until Hoop's resignation in 1945.

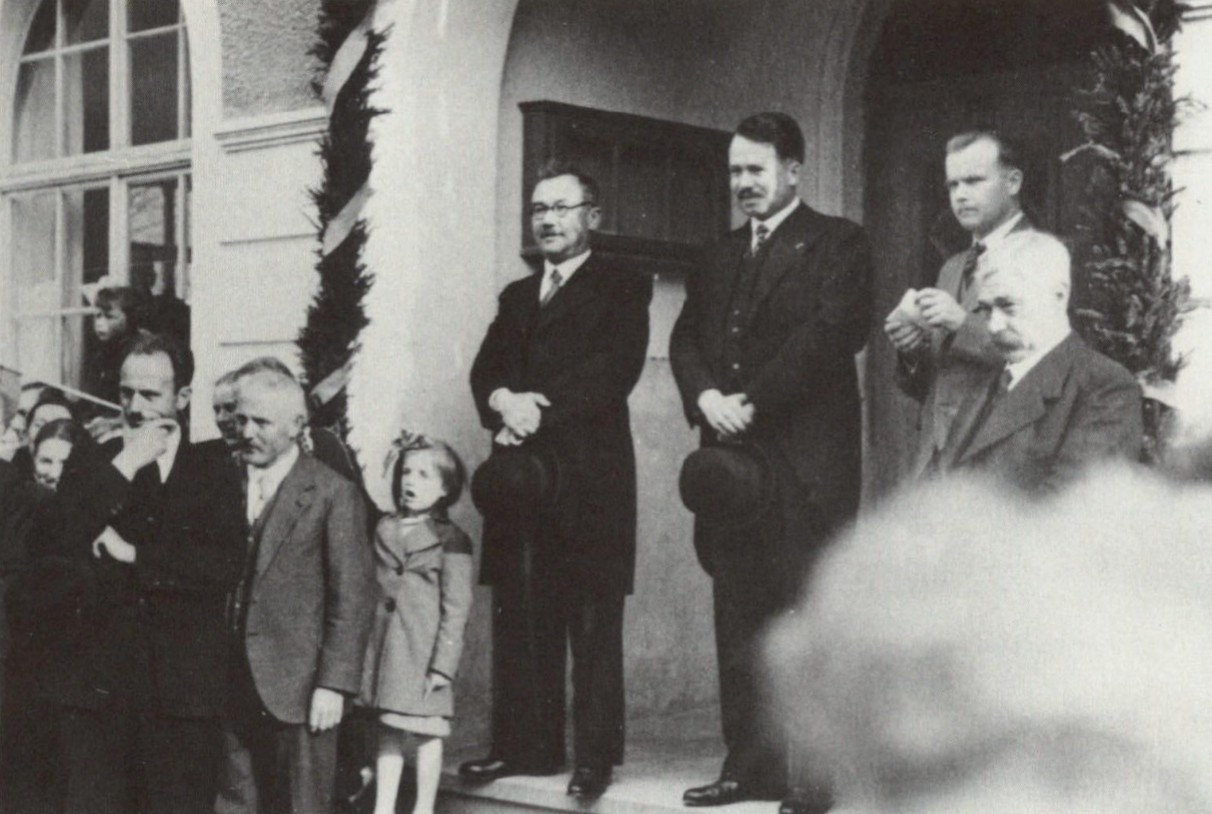
Vogt (right) with Franz Joseph II and Josef Hoop in Balzers on 8 March 1938

Despite being a member of the coalition, Vogt retained contacts within Nazi Germany before and during World War II, most of which was informal. He held particular contact with the Volksdeutsche Mittelstelle, who regarded him as a trusted contact. He was an outspoken supporter of National Socialism throughout his premiership as deputy prime minister and used his position to push relevant demands through Hoop, assisted by the party's president, Otto Schaedler, who agitated for a more cooperative stance towards Nazi Germany. Notably, in 1943 he met with Sicherheitsdienst Eugen Steimle in Berlin.

However, despite his friendly and cooperative attitude towards Nazi Germany, he played a role in thwarting the German National Movement in Liechtenstein (VDBL) when they attempted a coup in 1939 by intervening to prevent a German invasion.

Shortly after the war, an indictment was pressed against Vogt due to his ties to Germans intelligence, but the case never went to trial since the Patriotic Union threatened to end the coalition government. However, he received a travel ban from Switzerland from April 1946 to December 1947.

Vogt went on to serve in the board of education until 1950. He served in the Landtag of Liechtenstein from 1949 to 1966 and then as the Vice President of the State Court of Justice of Liechtenstein from 1969 to 1974. He served as a government councillor in the First Gerard Batliner cabinet from 16 July 1962 to 16 June 1965.

== Personal life ==
Vogt married Beate Hussak (26 May 1924 – 2012) on 9 October 1948 and they had six children together.

Vogt died on 23 March 1988 in Vaduz, at the age of 81 years old. He and his wife are buried at the cemetery of Vaduz.

== Bibliography ==
- Vogt, Paul (1987). 125 Jahre Landtag (in German). Vaduz: Landtag of the Principality of Liechtenstein.
