= Josef Büchel =

Deputy Prime Minister of Liechtenstein from 1957 to 1965

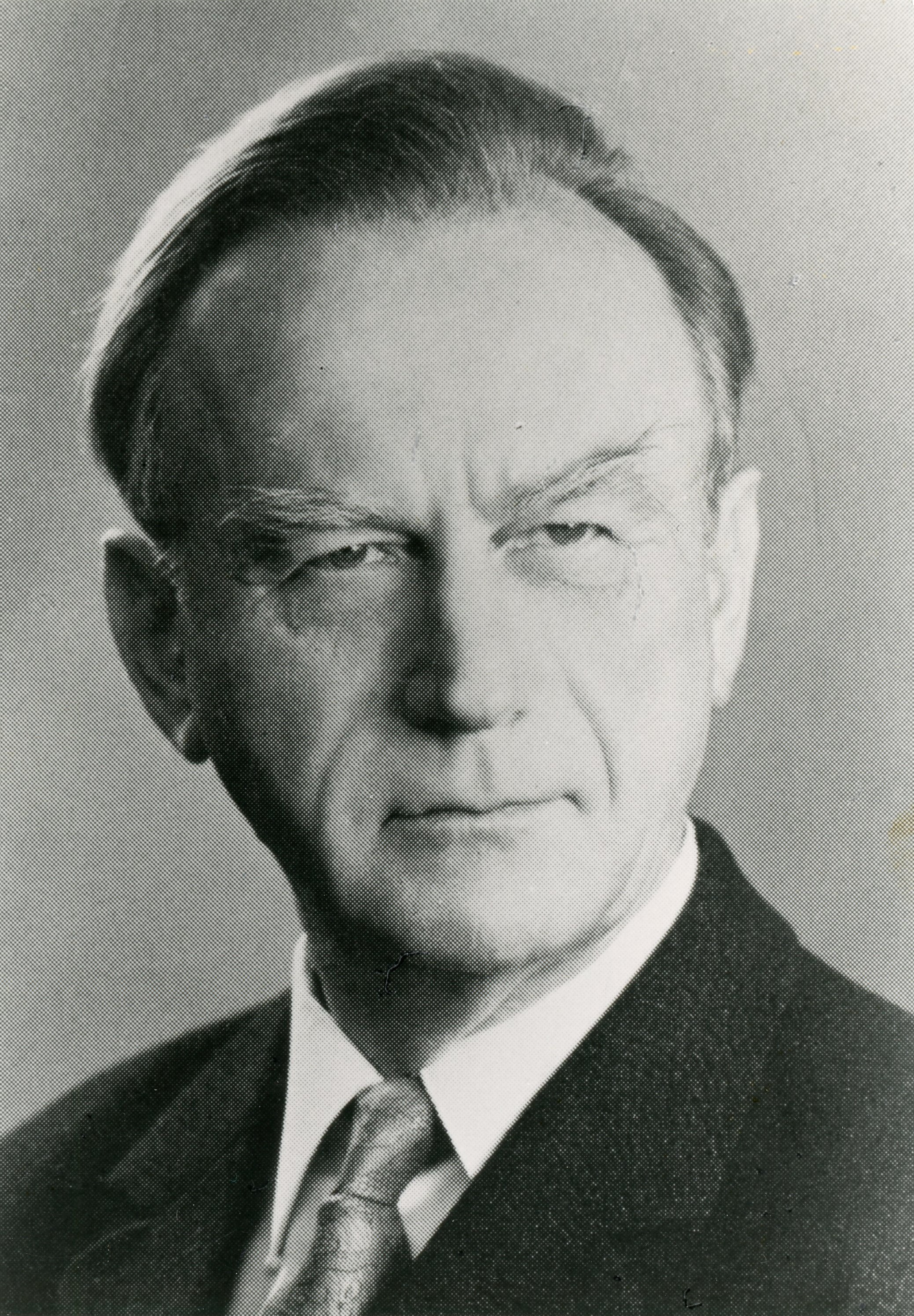
- Büchel in 1955

Deputy Prime Minister of Liechtenstein
- In office 17 July 1957 – 16 June 1965
- Monarch: Franz Joseph II
- Prime Minister: Alexander Frick; Gerard Batliner
- Preceded by: Ferdinand Nigg
- Succeeded by: Alfred Hilbe

Member of the Landtag of Liechtenstein for Oberland
- In office 1 September 1957 – 23 March 1958
- In office 15 February 1953 – 14 June 1953

Personal details
- Born: 28 February 1910 Gamprin, Liechtenstein
- Died: 15 November 1991 (aged 81) Triesen, Liechtenstein
- Party: Patriotic Union
- Spouse: Helena Schächle (m. 1935)
- Children: 3

Josef Büchel (28 February 1910 – 15 November 1991) was a teacher and civil servant from Liechtenstein who served as the Deputy Prime Minister of Liechtenstein from 1957 to 1965, under the government of Alexander Frick and Gerard Batliner. He previously served in the Landtag of Liechtenstein in 1953 and again from 1957 to 1958.

== Life ==
Büchel was born on 28 February 1910 in Gamprin as the son of Felix Büchel and Anna (née Matt) as one of seven children. Trained as a teacher, Büchel in Balzers from 1931 to 1935 and in Triesen from 1935 to 1945. Büchel founded the Liechtenstein section of the Swiss health and accident insurance Konkordia in 1932. He was also the conductor of the Triesen church choir from 1937 to 1945.

Büchel entered politics as a member of the Patriotic Union and as an editor of the Liechtensteiner Vaterland from 1938 to 1939 and again from 1941 to 1943. During this time he published several articles friendly to Nazi Germany. He was also a member of the State Tax Commission from 1939 to 1949 and the chairman of the commission from 1939 to 1944.

From 1945 to 1952 he was a government secretary. From February to June 1953 and again from 1957 to 1958 he was a member of the Landtag of Liechtenstein. From June 1953 to 1957 he was a deputy member of the Landtag. From 1954 to 1957 he was the party secretary of the Patriotic Union.

Following the death of Ferdinand Nigg in July 1957, Büchel was appointed Deputy Prime Minister of Liechtenstein, under the government of Alexander Frick. Following Frick's resignation on 16 July 1962, Büchel also served as deputy prime minister under the government of Gerard Batliner until 1965. He co-founded the Triesen Family Aid organisation in 1962.

From 1967 he worked as an independent legal agent and trustee. From 1970 to 1974 he was president of the truck board of directors and president of the truck supervisory board from 1974 to 1976. He was a judge at the Liechtenstein state court from 1979 to 1984. He became an honorary member of the Switzerland-Liechtenstein Konkordia Association from 1980 to his death.

== Personal life ==
Büchel married Helena Schächle (1 October 1908 – 26 October 1996) on 1 October 1935 and they had three children together. He died on 15 November 1991 in Triesen, aged 81 years old.
