= Ellhorn =

Mountain in Switzerland

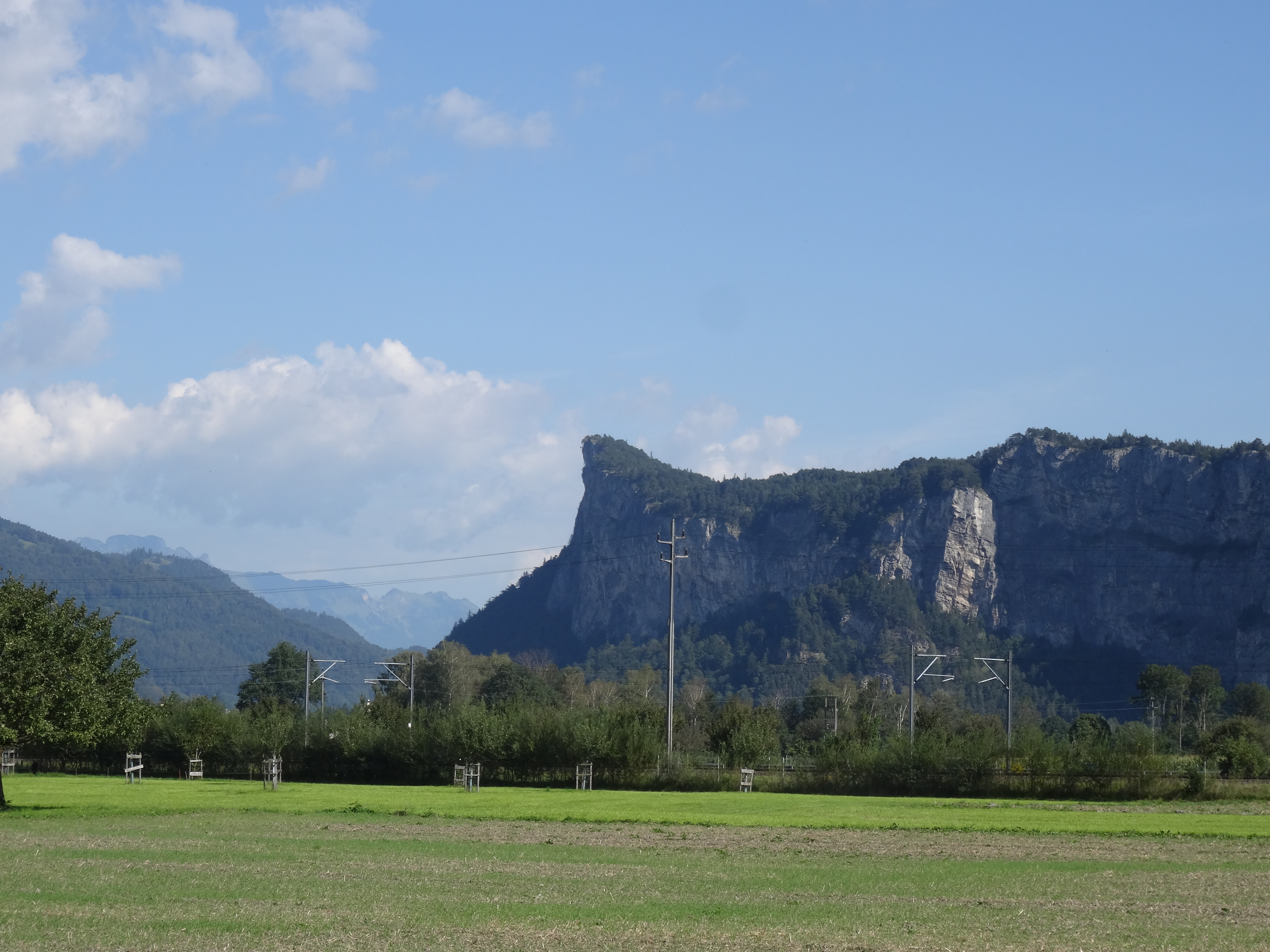
- Ellhorn, as seen from the south-west

Highest point
- Elevation: 758 m (2,487 ft)
- Listing: Mountains of Switzerland
- Coordinates: 47°3′13″N 9°28′44″E

Geography
- Location within Switzerland
- Location: Fläsch, Switzerland

Ellhorn is a mountain in Switzerland on the Rätikon mountain range on the Central Eastern Alps, located on the border with Liechtenstein. It has an elevation 758 metres (2,487 ft) above sea level.

== History ==
The mountain was historically part of Liechtenstein, in the municipality of Balzers. In the 1930s, Swiss military planners became concerned that the territory made fortifications in Fläsch vulnerable. This concern was heightened by perceptions that Liechtenstein was susceptible to annexation into Nazi Germany in the wake of the Anschluss of Austria.

In 1938, the Swiss Federal Council began negotiations with Liechtenstein to cede the Ellhorn mountain to them. Though Josef Hoop, the Prime Minister of Liechtenstein, was supportive of the transfer, he argued that the country should be fairly compensated for the loss of territory, with either a transfer of Swiss land elsewhere or greater banking cooperation between the two countries. The transfer faced resistance from the residents in Balzers, and was not supported by Franz Joseph II, the ruling Prince of Liechtenstein. In addition to unofficial objections from Nazi Germany, the lack of support forced Hoop to end negotiations with Switzerland.

Following World War II, Switzerland once again pressed Liechtenstein for the transfer of Ellhorn. Switzerland threatened to, among other things, end the customs union between the two countries which had existed since 1924. Despite the community in Balzers again objecting in November 1948, the transfer was approved by the Landtag of Liechtenstein the following month and finalised in 1949. In exchange for the transfer, Switzerland agreed to forgive much of Liechtenstein's debt incurred during World War II. In 1952, Switzerland expanded its fortifications in the area to include the Ellhorn mountain.
