= Alexander Frick =

Prime Minister of Liechtenstein from 1945 to 1962

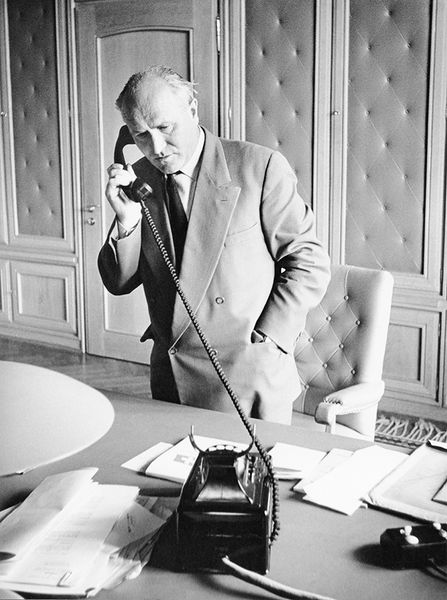
- Photograph by Walter Wachter c. 1960

Prime Minister of Liechtenstein
- In office 3 September 1945 – 16 July 1962
- Monarch: Franz Joseph II
- Deputy: Ferdinand Nigg; Josef Büchel
- Preceded by: Josef Hoop
- Succeeded by: Gerard Batliner

President of the Landtag of Liechtenstein
- In office January 1966 – December 1969
- Monarch: Franz Joseph II
- Vice President: Franz Nägele
- Preceded by: Martin Risch
- Succeeded by: Karlheinz Ritter

Member of the Landtag of Liechtenstein for Oberland
- In office 6 February 1966 – 3 February 1974

Personal details
- Born: 18 February 1910 Schaan, Liechtenstein
- Died: 31 October 1991 (aged 81) Schaan, Liechtenstein
- Party: Progressive Citizens' Party
- Spouse: Hildegard Kranz (m. 1939)
- Relations: Anton Frommelt (brother-in-law); Noldi Frommelt (nephew)
- Children: 9, including Hansjörg Frick

Alexander Frick (/frɪk/, German pronunciation: [ˌalɛˈksandɐ ˈfʁɪk]; 18 February 1910 – 31 October 1991) was a politician from Liechtenstein who served as Prime Minister of Liechtenstein from 1945 to 1962. He later went on to serve in the Landtag of Liechtenstein from 1966 to 1974 and as the President of the Landtag of Liechtenstein from 1966 to 1969.

Initially a civil servant in the Liechtenstein fiscal administration, Frick was involved in the founding of the Scouts of Liechtenstein in 1931 and was the president of the Liechtenstein Olympic Committee at its first appearance at the 1936 Summer Olympics. Frick was appointed prime minister in 1945 following the resignation of Josef Hoop. His first years in office included domestic challenges, particularly that of pressure to repatriate the soldiers of the First Russian National Army and to cede the Ellhorn mountain to Switzerland. His premiership oversaw an economic boom in the Liechtenstein economy, and the transformation of the country into a modern welfare state. He resigned for health reasons in 1962.

Frick returned to politics when he was elected to the Landtag of Liechtenstein in 1966, where he served until 1974. He was the president of the Landtag from 1966 to 1969.

== Early life and career ==
Frick was born on 18 February 1910 in Schaan as the son of his father by the same name and Theresia Wanger as one of 10 children, including his brother Georg Frick. From 1925 to 1929 he attended a teacher's training college, where he received a certificate.

From 1929 until 1936 he was a civil servant for the Liechtenstein fiscal administration, becoming director in 1936 and serving until 1945. In 1931 he founded the Scouts of Liechtenstein, in which he played an active role in countering the activities of the German National Movement in Liechtenstein (VBDL). From 1935 to 1937 he served as chairman of the Liechtenstein Olympic Committee, and as the president of the committee at the 1936 Summer Olympics.

== Prime Minister of Liechtenstein ==
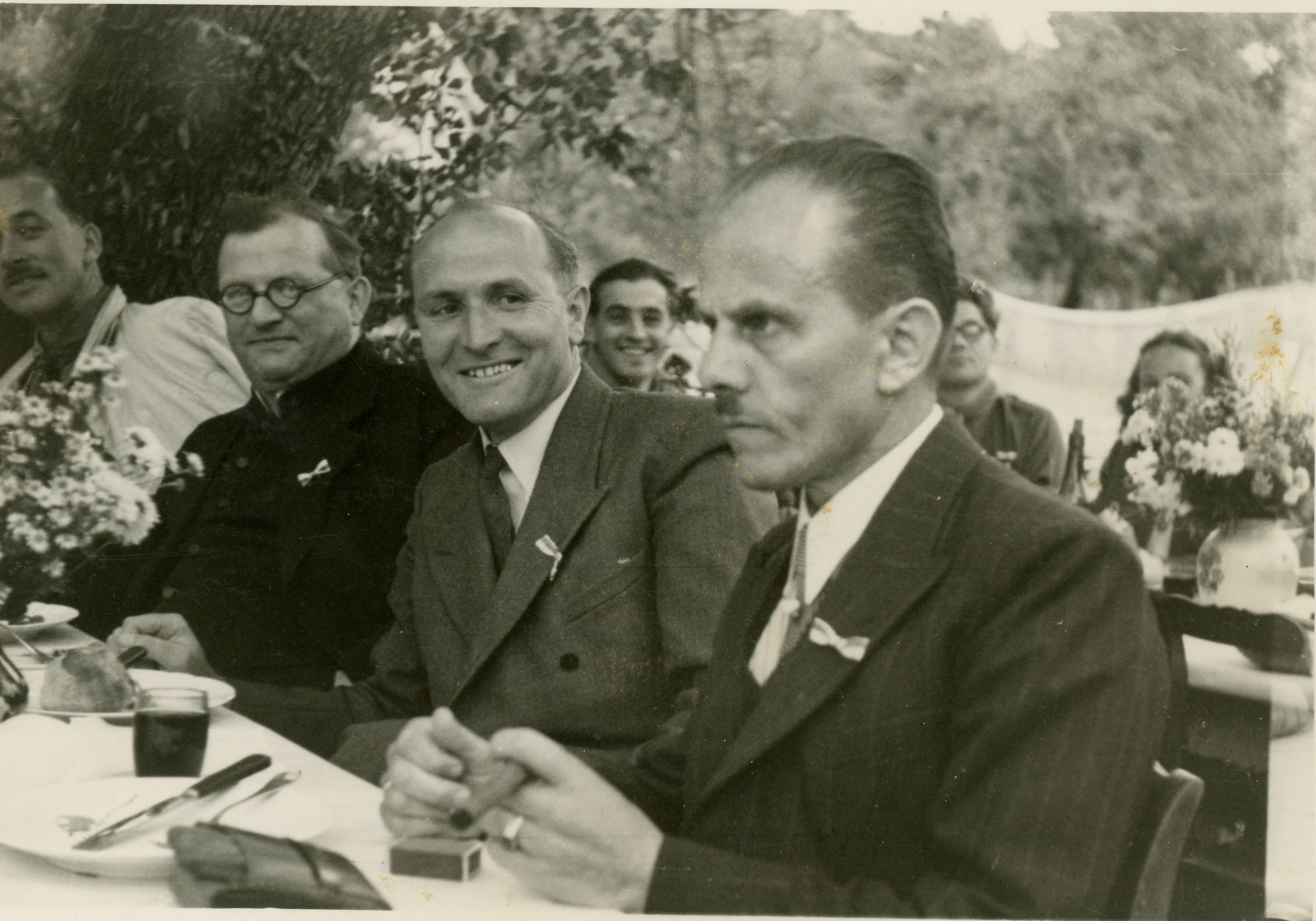
Frick (center) with Oswald Bühler and Prince Emanuel of Liechtenstein at a music festival in Mauren in June 1954.

Frick served as the Prime Minister of Liechtenstein from 3 September 1945 until 16 July 1962, serving as a member of the Progressive Citizens' Party. He succeeded Josef Hoop after his resignation on 3 September 1945. The government coalition established in 1938 continued throughout his premiership.

=== First Russian National Army and foreign policy ===
Upon taking office in 1945, Frick was faced with the challenge of dealing with the members of the First Russian National Army that had taken refuge in the country a few months prior. They were cared for by the Liechtenstein Red Cross. On 16 August 1945, the Soviet Union sent a delegation to Liechtenstein in an attempt to repatriate the Russians, which was refused despite increasing Soviet pressure to participate in the repatriation program. Eventually the government of Argentina offered the Russians asylum, and about a hundred people left. Liechtenstein was the only country that did not participate in the Soviet repatriation program. According to Frick, with the support of Franz Joseph II, the Russians were at no point in danger of being extradited and the general population of Liechtenstein supported the government in providing asylum to them.

Frick played a major role in expanding Liechtenstein's foreign policy and affairs. Notably pioneering the country's ascension to the International Court of Justice in 1950 and the Geneva Conventions the same year, despite resistance from countries in the Eastern Bloc. He also attempted to join the European Free Trade Association but was unsuccessful, instead being represented by Switzerland. In 1949, he oversaw Liechtenstein ceding the Ellhorn mountain to Switzerland as a result of Swiss demands and threats to, among other things, cease end the customs union between the two countries. Despite the local community in Balzers previously refusing to do so in November 1948, the transfer was approved by the Landtag of Liechtenstein the following month. In exchange to the transfer, Switzerland agreed to forgive much of Liechtenstein's debt that it had acquired to the country throughout World War II.

=== Domestic and economic policy ===
Frick advocated for the reconciliation of relations between Liechtenstein's political parties and pro-German elements during World War II, including the social re-integration of former members of the VBDL. However, members of the VDBL were still charged for an attempted coup in 1939. Other figures were charged for illegal intelligence providence, notably former Prime Minister Gustav Schädler who was sentenced to 6 months imprisonment, but did not serve the sentence for health reasons.

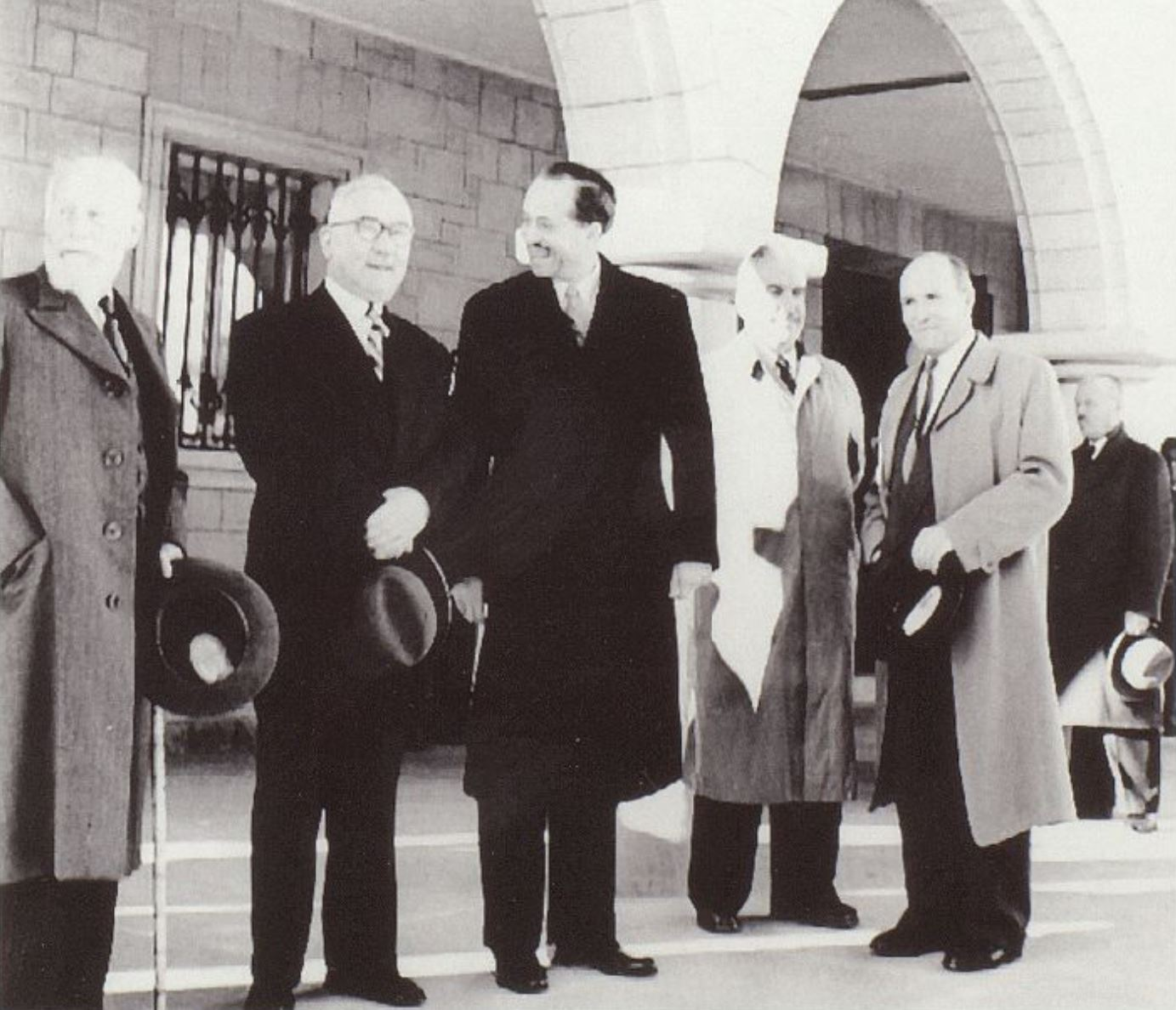
Frick (right) at the opening of the new Landesbank building on 28 November 1953

During Frick's premiership, he pioneered the transformation of Liechtenstein into a modern welfare state. In 1952 his government succeeded introducing pensions and survivors insurance via a referendum on the subject despite resistance from local businesses and agricultural establishments, followed by the introduction of family compensation in 1958 and disability insurance in 1959. At the same time, Frick was reserved on economic growth facilitated by foreign workers and immigrants, and supported a restricted border policy and limits of the residency of foreigners in Liechtenstein throughout his premiership, though he permitted non-residential commuters in the country. His term also included the creation of the Liechtenstein National Archives in 1961 and the Liechtenstein nature reserves in the same year.

Twice during Frick's premiership, early elections were called when the Patriotic Union members in the Landtag resigned and forced new elections as per the coalition government, first in June 1953 as a result from a dispute over the administrative composition of the old age and survivors’ insurance office in Liechtenstein and again in 1958 as a result over a dispute on electoral law. Both times, however, Frick succeeded in remaining as Prime Minister and maintaining the coalition government between the two parties. From 1945 to 1981, Frick was a board member of the Historical Association for the Principality of Liechtenstein and was also a contributor to the Liechtensteiner Volksblatt.

=== Resignation ===
Frick resigned on 16 July 1962 reportedly for health reasons, after serving the premiership for nearly seventeen years. He was succeeded by Gerard Batliner.

== Later life ==
In 1961 he was awarded a doctorate honoris causa from the University of Fribourg. He was president of the Liechtenstein-Switzerland society from 1972 to 1974. He was made an honorary member of the Historical Association for the Principality of Liechtenstein in 1981, the Liechtenstein-Switzerland society in 1986 and then in the Scouts of Liechtenstein in 1990.

Frick once again entered politics in 1966, when he was elected to the Landtag of Liechtenstein, where he served until 1974. He served as the President of the Landtag from January 1966 to December 1969. After the Progressive Citizens' Party lost in the 1970 Liechtenstein general election and Alfred Hilbe became Prime Minister, he was a proponent of continuing the coalition between the party and the Patriotic Union.

== Personal life ==
Frick married Hildegard Kranz (23 December 1917 – 29 April 1993) on 5 October 1939 and they had nine children together. His son Hansjörg Frick served as a government councillor from 2001 to 2005 in the first Otmar Hasler cabinet.

Frick died on 31 October 1991 in Schaan, aged 81 years old.

== Honours ==
- Austria: Grand Decoration of Honour in Silver with Sash for Services to the Republic of Austria (1957)
- Belgium: Grand Cordon of the Order of Leopold
- Liechtenstein:
  - Commemorative Medal for the 50th birthday of HSH Prince Franz Joseph II (1956)
  - Grand Cross with Diamonds of the Order of Merit of the Principality of Liechtenstein (1967)
- Vatican: Knight's Cross of the Order of St. Gregory the Great

== See also ==
- Politics of Liechtenstein
- Alexander Frick cabinet
