= 1962 Liechtenstein general election =

- 25 March 1962
- All 15 seats in the Landtag; 8 seats needed for a majority
- Turnout: 94.65% (▼1.79pp)
Party	Leader	Vote %	Seats	+/–
FBP	Alexander Frick	47.18	8	−1
VU	Otto Schaedler	42.73	7	+1
This lists parties that won seats. See the complete results below.
Results by constituency
Prime Minister before	Prime Minister after
Alexander Frick; FBP	Alexander Frick; FBP

General elections were held in Liechtenstein on 25 March 1962 to elect the 15 members of the Landtag. The Progressive Citizens' Party (FBP) won eight seats and retained its majority, while the Patriotic Union (VU) won seven. Voter turnout was 94.7%.

The election saw a new political party, the Christian Social Party, contest the election for the first time, but it failed to reach the 18% electoral threshold to win seats in the Landtag. Following the election, the coalition government led by prime minister Alexander Frick remained, but he would resign in July and be succeeded by Gerard Batliner.

== Background ==
In the 1958 elections the Progressive Citizens' Party (FBP) won nine seats and retained its majority, while the Patriotic Union (VU) won six. The coalition government under the leadership of prime minister Alexander Frick remained. The elections had been called early due to the VU filing an electoral complaint following the 1957 elections. The FBP and VU, at the request of Franz Joseph II, Prince of Liechtenstein, agreed to amended the constitution to make it so that the Liechtenstein state court would decide on electoral complaints instead of the Landtag. As per the agreement, fresh elections were also called.

Frick's fourth term in office oversaw the introduction home ownership program in 1958, and disability insurance in 1959. It also saw the Vaduz Evening Technical College in 1961 and taxation reform the same year, aimed at providing social balance and relief for families. In 1959 President of the Landtag, Josef Hoop of the FBP, died in office and was succeeded by Martin Risch on 28 March 1960.

== Electoral system ==
The 15 members of the Landtag were elected by open list proportional representation from two constituencies, Oberland with 9 seats and Unterland with 6 seats. Voters voted for a party list and then may have struck through candidates for whom they did not wish to cast a preferential vote, and may also have added names of candidates from other lists. The electoral threshold to win a seat was 18%. Landtag members sit for a four-year term. Once formed, the Landtag elected the prime minister and two government councillors who were then appointed by the reigning prince to govern in a cabinet. The prime minister was appointed for a six-year term, while government councillors sit a four-year term. The elections used a majority clause, where the party with the most votes would automatically win the most seats. Only men aged 21 and above were eligible to vote.

== Campaign ==
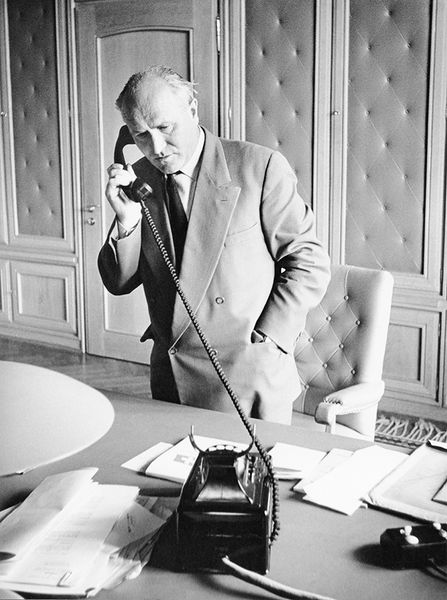
Alexander Frick, pictured in 1960

Both the FBP and VU campaigned on their respective party newspapers, the Liechtensteiner Volksblatt and Liechtensteiner Vaterland. The FBP highlighted its achievements in introducing the 1961 tax reform and providing state grants for apprentices via a funding law. At the same time, the party called for further expansion of the Vaduz Evening Technical College, expansion of education including vocational education, and tax relief for working students. The FBP's programme also included policies such as encouraging home ownership via interest free loans and funds to make building plots cheaper, in addition to increasing pensions and credit support for small businesses and farmers. The party's candidate for prime minister was the incumbent Frick.

Conversely, the VU downplayed the FBP's achievements in office, claiming that Liechtenstein's economic growth was due to cooperation from the population and favourable circumstances in the global economy. During campaigning, the VU called for administration reform, which included giving greater responsibilities to civil servants and less work load to the government councillors. The party's programme also included policies such as the abolition of income tax for apprentices, expanding health insurance, universal dental care, promoting home ownership, and adjusting pensions to Swiss levels. The Volksblatt speculated that incumbent deputy prime minister, Josef Büchel, was the VU's candidate for prime minister should it have won the election.

A new political party, the Christian Social Party (CSP), was founded ahead of the 1962 elections. For unknown reasons, the party became known as the "greens". The CSP sought to challenge the political dominance of the FBP and VU; its programme included policies such as expansion of education, providing scholarships, and wages adjusted to the cost of living.

== Candidates ==
Political parties in Liechtenstein required the support of 30 voters from a constituency to be eligible to nominate a candidate list in it. A total of 39 candidates contested the election.

Oberland	FBP	VU	CSP
Oberland	Martin Risch; Hans Gassner; Meinrad Ospelt; Stefan Wachter; Franz Josef Schurte; Josef Büchel; Fidel Brunhart; Marcellin Kindle; Quido Wolf	Roman Gassner; Otto Schaedler; Johann Beck; Alois Vogt; Andreas Vogt; Samuel Kindle; Gustav Ospelt; Hans Hilti; Martin Büchel	Hugo Büchel; Bruno Vogt; Tschol Ferdi; Fidel Büchel; Hermann Florian
Unterland	FBP	VU	CSP
Unterland	Ernst Büchel; Leo Gerner; Georg Oehri; Alfons Büchel; Josef Hoop; Otto Kranz	Franz Nägele; Paul Oehri; Alois Oehri; Oswald Hasler; Alois Hassler; Martin Kind	Kaiser Fritz; Meier Hans; Kranz Quido; Wohlwend Alois
Source: Liechtensteiner Volksblatt

== Results ==
The FBP won eight seats, a decrease of one, and retained its majority in the Landtag, whereas the VU won seven, an increase of one. The CSP received 10.1% of the vote, but failed to reach the electoral threshold of 18% to win seats in the Landtag. Voter turnout was 94.65%.

Party	Votes	%	Seats	+/–
Progressive Citizens' Party	1,599	47.18	8	–1
Patriotic Union	1,448	42.73	7	+1
Christian Social Party	342	10.09	0	New
Total	3,389	100.00	15	0
Valid votes	3,389	98.20		
Invalid/blank votes	62	1.80		
Total votes	3,451	100.00		
Registered voters/turnout	3,646	94.65		
Source: Vogt

=== By electoral district ===
Electoral district	Seats	Electorate	Party	Elected members	Substitutes	Votes	%	Seats	+/–
Oberland	9	2,458	Progressive Citizens' Party	Martin Risch; Hans Gassner; Meinrad Ospelt; Stefan Wachter; Franz Josef Schurte	Josef Büchel; Fidel Brunhart; Marzellin Kindle; Guido Wolf	1,038	45.6	5	0
Oberland	9	2,458	Patriotic Union	Roman Gassner; Otto Schaedler; Johann Beck; Alois Vogt	Andreas Vogt; Samuel Kindle; Gustav Ospelt; Hans Hilti	1,023	44.9	4	0
Oberland	9	2,458	Christian Social Party	–	–	217	9.5	0	New
Unterland	6	1,188	Progressive Citizens' Party	Ernst Büchel; Leo Gerner; Georg Oehri	Alfons Büchel; Otto Kranz	561	50.5	3	▼1
Unterland	6	1,188	Patriotic Union	Franz Nägele; Paul Oehri; Alois Oehri	Oswald Hasler; Alois Hassler; Martin Kind	425	38.3	3	▲1
Unterland	6	1,188	Christian Social Party	–	–	125	11.2	0	0
Source: Vogt

== Aftermath ==
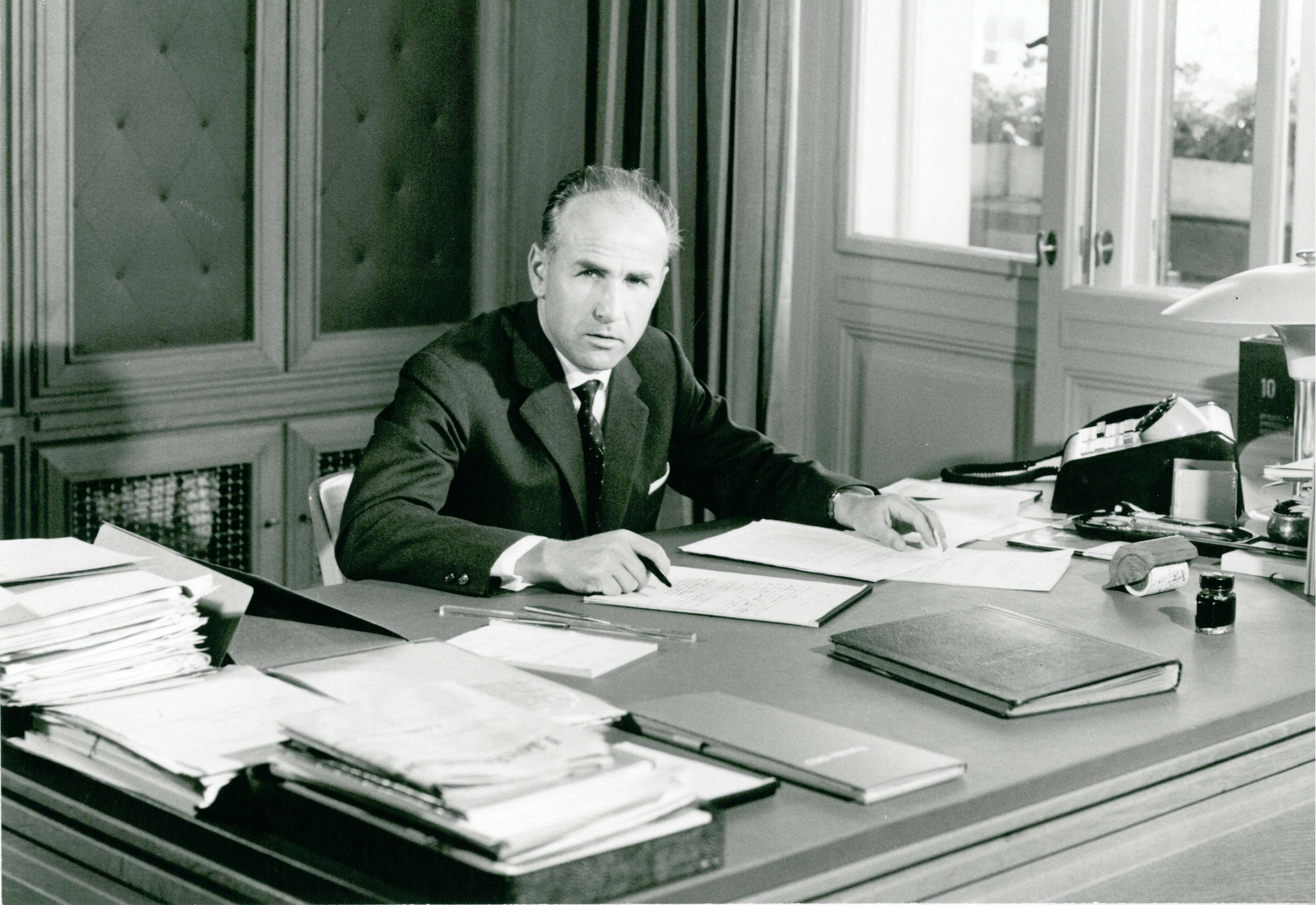
Gerard Batliner

Following the elections, the coalition government between the FBP and VU under the leadership of Frick remained. However, Frick would resign in June, citing health reasons. He was succeeded by Gerard Batliner in July. Martin Risch was re-elected as President of the Landtag upon the first session of the newly elected Landtag on 27 June 1962, with Alois Vogt of the VU as vice president.

The CSP filed an electoral complaint claiming that the party was entitled to one mandate in both the Oberland and Unterland electoral districts, and that the electoral threshold of 18% was unconstitutional. The Liechtenstein state court rejected the CSP's claim to seats in the Landtag, but deemed the electoral threshold unconstitutional and it was subsequently abolished.
