= 1966 Liechtenstein general election =

- 4 and 6 February 1966
- 15 seats in the Landtag; 8 seats needed for a majority
- Turnout: 95.61% (▲0.96pp)
Party	Leader	Vote %	Seats	+/–
FBP	Gerard Batliner	48.47	8	0
VU	Franz Nägele	42.79	7	0
This lists parties that won seats. See the complete results below.
Results by constituency
Prime Minister before	Prime Minister after
Gerard Batliner; FBP	Gerard Batliner; FBP

General elections were held in Liechtenstein on 4 and 6 February 1966 to elect the 15 members of the Landtag. The Progressive Citizens' Party (FBP) won eight seats and retained its majority, while the Patriotic Union (VU) won seven. Voter turnout was 95.6%.

The Christian Social Party (CSP) also contested the election, but failed to win seats in the Landtag. Following the election, the coalition government led by prime minister Gerard Batliner remained. The CSP submitted two electoral complaints following the elections, but they were rejected. It was the last FBP-led government to be re-elected until the 2005 elections.

== Background ==
In the 1962 elections the Progressive Citizens' Party (FBP) won eight seats and retained its majority, while the Patriotic Union (VU) won seven. The coalition government under the leadership of prime minister Alexander Frick remained. However, Frick resigned in June citing health reasons, and was succeeded by Gerard Batliner in July.

Batliner's term in office was characterized by working towards greater international participation, including starting the proceedings towards joining the Council of Europe. It also saw the establishment of the Liechtenstein Music School in 1963 and the Liechtenstein Development Service in 1965. In addition, it also saw the increasing of child allowances following a successful referendum in 1965, and the passing of the Social Welfare Act the same year.

== Electoral system ==
The 15 members of the Landtag were elected by open list proportional representation from two constituencies, Oberland with 9 seats and Unterland with 6 seats. Voters voted for a party list and then may have struck through candidates for whom they did not wish to cast a preferential vote, and may also have added names of candidates from other lists. Landtag members sit for a four-year term. The elections used a majority clause, where the party with the most votes would automatically win the most seats. Only men aged 21 and above were eligible to vote.

The electoral threshold of 18% was deemed unconstitutional by the Liechtenstein state court in 1962 and was replaced by a basic mandate system. In addition, a constitutional amendment passed in 1965 increased the number of government councillors from three to five, including making the deputy prime minister a full member of government. The amendment also reduced the term of the prime minister from six to four years, intended to synchronize the prime minister's term with the Landtag and government councillors who served a four-year term.

== Campaign ==
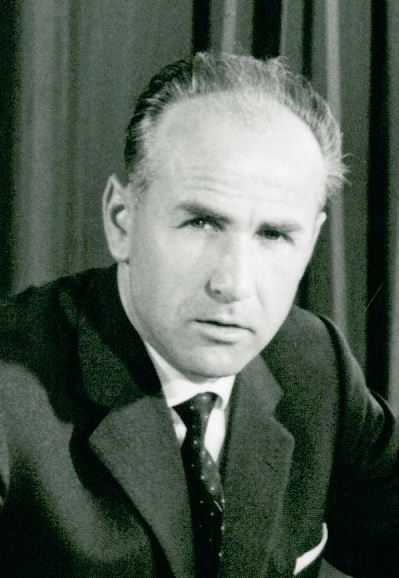
Gerard Batliner

Both the FBP and VU campaigned on their respective party newspapers, the Liechtensteiner Volksblatt and Liechtensteiner Vaterland. The FBP appealed to farmers and criticized the VU for supposedly not having any farmers on its party list for the election. Furthermore, the FBP accused the VU of wanting to achieve a majority of seats in the Landtag "at any cost", and that of lying. The FBP's programme included policies such as expanding welfare, expanding education, establishing sports facilities, environmental issues such as clean land and air, and a balanced budget. The party's candidate for prime minister was the incumbent Batliner.

On the other hand, the VU highlighted its achievements in government, particularly in regards to fulfilling its programme from the 1962 elections, and accused the FBP of claiming credit for the VU's achievements. Furthermore, during campaigning the VU accused the FBP of becoming a "right-wing extremist party", citing alleged concertation of power, disregard to the minority in the Landtag, and youth exploitation. The VU advocated for policies such as protecting private property, expanding education, social legislation, tax modernisation, and affordable housing. Its programme also included, among other policies, maintaining friendly relations with Switzerland and Austria, and the building of a hospital in Liechtenstein.

The Christian Social Party (CSP) campaigned on its newspaper, Der Liechtensteiner, which had been founded in 1964. The party appealed to the economically disadvantaged and unemployed; it indirectly accused the FBP and VU of "vote buying". The CSP's programme included policies such as the construction of social housing, supporting small businesses, building sports facilities, and road construction.

== Candidates ==
Political parties in Liechtenstein required the support of 30 voters from a constituency to be eligible to nominate a candidate list in it. A total of 39 candidates contested the election.

Oberland	FBP	VU	CSP
Oberland	Alexander Frick; Hans Gassner; Peter Marxer; Josef Büchel; Gustav Ospelt; Josef Frommelt; Josef Banzer; Ernst Ospelt; Gustav Jehle	Roman Gassner; Johann Beck; Samuel Kindle; Karlheinz Ritter; Franz Beck; Franz Vogt; Otto Hasler; David Schädler; Ivo Beck	Hugo Büchel; Werner Walser; Raimund Tschol; Friedrich Vogt; Florian Hermann; Anton Risch
Unterland	FBP	VU	CSP
Unterland	Ernst Büchel; Georg Oehri; Leo Gerner; Georg Malin; Josef Hoop; Gebhard Näscher	Franz Nägele; Paul Oehri; Cyrill Büchel; Oswald Hasler; Josef Spalt; Eugen Hasler	Fritz Kaiser; Roland Marxer; Hans Meier
Source: Liechtensteiner Volksblatt

== Results ==
The seat distribution remained unchanged from the February 1953 elections, with the FBP winning a majority of eight seats, whereas the VU won seven. The CSP received 8.7% of the vote, a 1.4% decrease from 1962, and did not win any seats. Voter turnout was 95.61%.

Party	Votes	%	Seats	+/–
Progressive Citizens' Party	1,791	48.47	8	0
Patriotic Union	1,581	42.79	7	0
Christian Social Party	323	8.74	0	0
Total	3,695	100.00	15	0
Valid votes	3,695	99.30		
Invalid/blank votes	26	0.70		
Total votes	3,721	100.00		
Registered voters/turnout	3,892	95.61		
Source: Vogt

=== By electoral district ===
Electoral district	Seats	Electorate	Party	Elected members	Substitutes	Votes	%	Seats	+/–
Oberland	9	2,635	Patriotic Union	Roman Gassner; Johann Beck; Karlheinz Ritter; Ivo Beck; Samuel Kindle	Franz Beck; Otto Hasler; Franz Vogt; David Schädler	1,149	46.2	5	▲1
Oberland	9	2,635	Progressive Citizens' Party	Alexander Frick; Peter Marxer; Gustav Ospelt; Josef Büchel	Hans Gassner; Josef Banzer; Josef Frommelt Jr.	1,139	45.8	4	▼1
Oberland	9	2,635	Christian Social Party	–	–	199	8.0	0	0
Unterland	6	1,257	Progressive Citizens' Party	Ernst Büchel; Leo Gerner; Georg Malin; Georg Oehri	Gebhard Näscher	652	54.0	4	▲1
Unterland	6	1,257	Patriotic Union	Franz Nägele; Cyrill Büchel	Eugen Hasler; Oswald Hasler	432	35.8	2	▼1
Unterland	6	1,257	Christian Social Party	–	–	124	10.2	0	0
Source: Vogt

== Aftermath ==
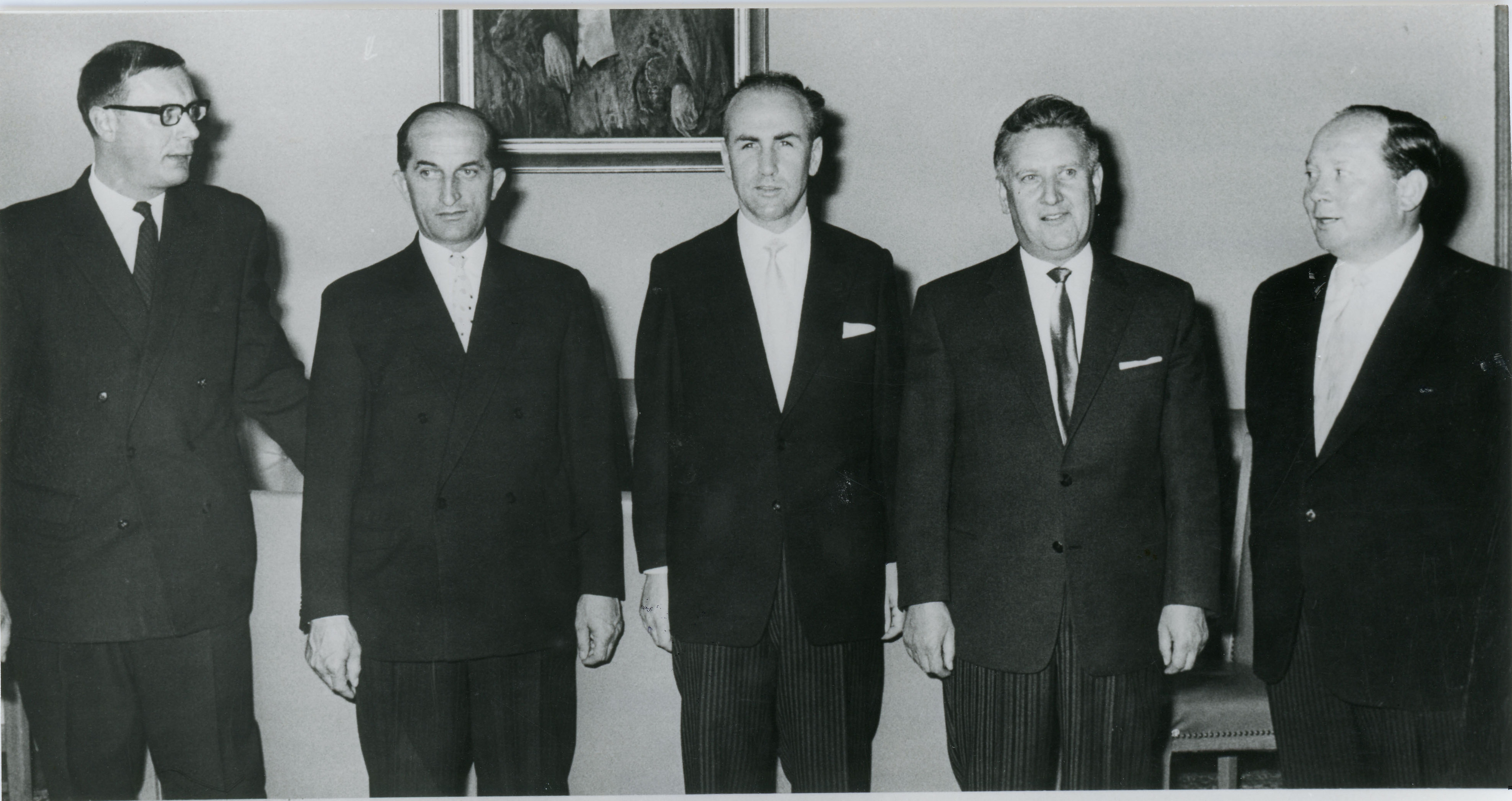
The government of Gerard Batliner, pictured in 1965

Following the elections, the coalition government between the FBP and VU under the leadership of Batliner remained. Alexander Frick of the FBP was elected as President of the Landtag upon the first session of the newly elected Landtag on 6 May 1966, with Franz Nägele of the VU as vice president. The Volksblatt stated that with the CSP the two-party system between the FBP and VU was "put to a real test for the first time". In addition, it also stated that the CSP receiving fewer votes than in 1962 correlated to the electorate choosing to maintain the two-party system.

The CSP filed an electoral complaint claiming that the party was entitled to one mandate in the Oberland electoral district. In addition, a separate electoral complaint was also filed by the CSP alleging that there were irregularities with the distribution of neutral ballot papers, and it requested that the election be annulled. Due to the complaints, the first meeting of the newly-elected Landtag was postponed. In the subsequent hearing on 9 March, the Liechtenstein state court rejected the complaints and declared the elections valid; the CSP and Liechtenstein government were represented by Peter Stern from Vienna and Walter Kieber respectively. The hearing reportedly attracted significant public attention, with the spectator tickets running out within twenty minutes.
