= 1958 Liechtenstein general election =

- 23 March 1958
- All 15 seats in the Landtag; 8 seats needed for a majority
- Turnout: 96.44% (▲3.05pp)
Party	Leader	Vote %	Seats	+/–
FBP	Alexander Frick	54.47	9	+1
VU	Otto Schaedler	45.53	6	−1
This lists parties that won seats. See the complete results below.
Results by constituency
Prime Minister before	Prime Minister after
Alexander Frick; FBP	Alexander Frick; FBP

General elections were held in Liechtenstein on 23 March 1958 to elect the 15 members of the Landtag. Early elections were called to allow the usage of new electoral reforms. The Progressive Citizens' Party (FBP) won nine seats and retained its majority, while the Patriotic Union (VU) won six. Voter turnout was 96.4%.

In its campaign, both the FBP and VU advocated for policies namely expanding education and taxation reforms. The FBP increased its majority to nine seats, winning a majority in both the Oberland and Unterland electoral districts for the first time. Following the elections, the coalition government between the FBP and VU led by prime minister Alexander Frick remained.

== Background ==
In the 1957 elections the Progressive Citizens' Party (FBP) retained its majority of eight seats, while the Patriotic Union (VU) won seven. The coalition government under the leadership of prime minister Alexander Frick remained.

Following the election, the VU filed an electoral, alleging that citizens who had given up their residency in the country were allowed to vote in the Unterland electoral district. The FBP rejected this demand in the Landtag, but at the request of Franz Joseph II, Prince of Liechtenstein, both parties agreed to amend the constitution such that the Liechtenstein state court would decide on electoral complaints instead of the Landtag. The amendment also made it so that scheduled elections must be held in February or March. As per the agreement, fresh elections were called.

== Electoral system ==
The 15 members of the Landtag were elected by open list proportional representation from two constituencies, Oberland with 9 seats and Unterland with 6 seats. Voters voted for a party list and then may have struck through candidates for whom they did not wish to cast a preferential vote, and may also have added names of candidates from other lists. The electoral threshold to win a seat is 18%. Landtag members sit for a four-year term. Once formed, the Landtag elected the prime minister and two government councillors who were then appointed by the reigning prince to govern in a cabinet. The prime minister was appointed for a six-year term, while government councillors sit a four-year term. The election was the first in Liechtenstein to use a majority clause, where the party with the most votes would automatically win the most seats. Only men aged 21 and above were eligible to vote.

== Campaign ==
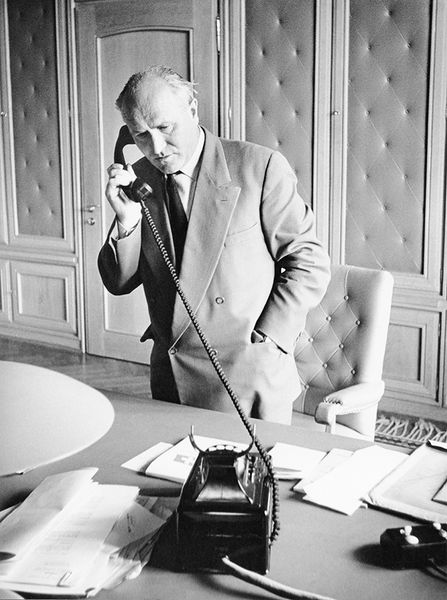
Alexander Frick, pictured in 1960

Both the FBP and VU campaigned on their respective party newspapers, the Liechtensteiner Volksblatt and Liechtensteiner Vaterland. The FBP accused the VU of obstructing the Landtag, while also asserting that the FBP had fulfilled its campaign promise in regards to building private homes since the 1957 elections. The FBP's programme included policies such as the continued building of private housing, taxation reforms, expanding health insurance, increasing pensions, and expanding education. The party's candidate for prime minister was the incumbent Frick.

Conversely, the VU criticized the FBP for rejecting the former's electoral complaint, alleging that it was against the law. During its campaign, the VU advocated for financial assistance to families. In addition, the party advocated for an improvement in education by granting scholarships and expanding vocational education, to adapt to Liechtenstein's changing economy. The VU's programme also included policies such as reforms to the state administration, improvements to healthcare, increased social housing, expansion of tourism, and taxation reforms aimed at smaller incomes.

== Candidates ==
Political parties in Liechtenstein required the support of 30 voters from a constituency to be eligible to nominate a candidate list in it. A total of 30 candidates contested in the election.

Oberland	FBP	VU
Oberland	Josef Hoop; Martin Risch; Josef Büchel; Hans Gassner; Fidel Brunhart; Stefan Wachter; Meinrad Ospelt; Franz Josef Schurte; Albert Laternser	Alois Vogt; Johann Beck; Andreas Vogt; Roman Gassner; Hans Hilti; Gustav Ospelt; Engelbert Banzer; Walter Oehri; Hans Wachter
Unterland	FBP	VU
Unterland	Georg Oehri; Ernst Büchel; Leo Gerner; Alfons Büchel; Engelbert Kranz; Josef Oehri	Johann Georg Hasler; Alois Oehri; Paul Büchel; Franz Nägele; Paul Oehri; Stefan Goop
Source: Liechtensteiner Volksblatt

== Results ==
The FBP won nine seats, an increase of one, and retained its majority in the Landtag, whereas the VU won six, a decrease of one. Voter turnout was 96.44%.

Party	Votes	%	Seats	+/–
Progressive Citizens' Party	1,839	54.47	9	+1
Patriotic Union	1,537	45.53	6	–1
Total	3,376	100.00	15	0
Valid votes	3,376	98.77		
Invalid/blank votes	42	1.23		
Total votes	3,418	100.00		
Registered voters/turnout	3,544	96.44		
Source: Vogt

=== By electoral district ===
Electoral district	Seats	Electorate	Party	Elected members	Substitutes	Votes	%	Seats	+/–
Oberland	9	2,381	Progressive Citizens' Party	Josef Hoop; Martin Risch; Meinrad Ospelt; Fidel Brunhart; Stefan Wachter	Hans Gassner; Franz Josef Schurte; Josef Büchel	1,171	52.1	5	▲1
Oberland	9	2,381	Patriotic Union	Johann Beck; Alois Vogt; Roman Gassner; Andreas Vogt	Walter Oehri; Hans Hilti; Gustav Ospelt	1,076	47.9	4	▼1
Unterland	6	1,163	Progressive Citizens' Party	Alfons Büchel; Leo Gerner; Ernst Büchel; Georg Oehri	Engelbert Kranz; Josef Oehri	668	59.2	4	0
Unterland	6	1,163	Patriotic Union	Alois Oehri; Paul Oehri	Johann Georg Hasler; Franz Nägele	461	40.8	2	0
Source: Vogt

== Aftermath ==
Following the elections, the coalition government between the FBP and VU under the leadership of Frick remained. Josef Hoop of the FBP was re-elected as President of the Landtag upon the first session of the newly elected Landtag on 31 March 1958, with Alois Vogt of the VU as vice president.

The FBP in the Volksblatt declared that the party increasing its majority to nine seats was due to voters supporting the FBP's policies while also rejecting the VU's campaign. On the other hand, the VU in the Vaterland alleged that the poor electoral result was due to unfair political manoeuvres and the suppression of VU candidates in the Unterland. The VU also remarked that the result did not proportionally represent the voting power between the two parties.
