= 1954 Liechtenstein local elections =

← 1951	31 January 1954	1957 →
- Mayoral results by municipality

Local elections were held in Liechtenstein on 31 January 1954 to elect the municipal councils and the mayors of the eleven municipalities.

== Results ==
=== Summary ===
Party	Mayors
Progressive Citizens' Party	8
Patriotic Union	3
Total	11
Source: Liechtensteiner Volksblatt

=== By municipality ===
Municipality	Party	Elected mayor
Balzers	Progressive Citizens' Party	Fidel Brunhart
Eschen	Patriotic Union	Johann Georg Hasler
Gamprin	Progressive Citizens' Party	Johann Georg Hasler
Mauren	Progressive Citizens' Party	Oswald Bühler
Planken	Progressive Citizens' Party	Gustav Jehle
Ruggell	Patriotic Union	Andreas Hoop
Schaan	Progressive Citizens' Party	Tobias Jehle
Schellenberg	Progressive Citizens' Party	Georg Oehri
Triesen	Patriotic Union	Ferdinand Heidegger
Triesenberg	Progressive Citizens' Party	Hans Gassner
Vaduz	Progressive Citizens' Party	David Strub
Source: Liechtensteiner Volksblatt
