= 1963 Liechtenstein local elections =

← 1960	20 January 1963	1966 →
- Mayoral results by municipality

Local elections were held in Liechtenstein on 20 January 1963 to elect the municipal councils and the mayors of the eleven municipalities.

== Electoral system ==
Under the municipal law of 1959, the mayors of the respective municipalities were elected by a majority vote. The municipal councillors and their deputies were elected by open list proportional representation. Voters vote for a party list and then may strike through candidates they do not wish to cast a preferential vote for and may add names of candidates from other lists. Only men aged 20 or over were eligible to vote.

== Results ==
=== Summary ===
Party	Mayors
Progressive Citizens' Party	5
Patriotic Union	6
Total	11
Source: Liechtensteiner Volksblatt

=== By municipality ===
Municipality	Party	Votes	Elected mayor
Balzers	Patriotic Union	200	Walter Brunhart
Eschen	Patriotic Union	185	Franz Meier
Gamprin	Patriotic Union	58	Alois Oehri
Mauren	Progressive Citizens' Party	242	Egon Meier
Planken	Progressive Citizens' Party	17	Gustav Jehle
Ruggell	Patriotic Union	134	Andreas Hoop
Schaan	Patriotic Union	320	Ludwig Beck
Schellenberg	Progressive Citizens' Party	76	Hugo Oehri
Triesen	Patriotic Union	188	Alois Beck
Triesenberg	Progressive Citizens' Party	175	Hans Gassner
Vaduz	Progressive Citizens' Party	276	David Strub
Source: Liechtensteiner Volksblatt
