= 1966 Liechtenstein local elections =

← 1963	16 January 1966	1969 →
- Mayoral results by municipality

Local elections were held in Liechtenstein on 16 January 1966 to elect the municipal councils and the mayors of the eleven municipalities.

== Electoral system ==
Under the municipal law of 1959, the mayors of the respective municipalities were elected by a majority vote. The municipal councillors and their deputies were elected by open list proportional representation. Voters vote for a party list and then may strike through candidates they do not wish to cast a preferential vote for and may add names of candidates from other lists. Only men aged 20 or over were eligible to vote.

== Results ==
=== Summary ===
Party	Mayors
Progressive Citizens' Party	6
Patriotic Union	5
Total	11
Source: Liechtensteiner Volksblatt

=== By municipality ===
Municipality	Party	Votes	Elected mayor
Balzers	Progressive Citizens' Party	241	Emanuel Vogt
Eschen	Patriotic Union	272	Franz Meier
Gamprin	Patriotic Union	61	Alois Oehri
Mauren	Progressive Citizens' Party	192	Egon Meier
Planken	Progressive Citizens' Party	17	Gustav Jehle
Ruggell	Progressive Citizens' Party	98	Hugo Oehri
Schaan	Patriotic Union	254	Ludwig Beck
Schellenberg	Progressive Citizens' Party	71	Hugo Oehri
Triesen	Patriotic Union	238	Alois Beck
Triesenberg	Patriotic Union	190	Alfons Schädler
Vaduz	Progressive Citizens' Party	236	Meinrad Ospelt
Source: Liechtensteiner Volksblatt
