= 1951 Liechtenstein local elections =

← 1948	28 January 1951	1954 →
- Mayoral results by municipality

Local elections were held in Liechtenstein on 28 January 1951 to elect the municipal councils and the mayors of the eleven municipalities.

== Results ==
=== Summary ===
Party	Mayors
Progressive Citizens' Party	7
Patriotic Union	4
Total	11
Source: Liechtensteiner Volksblatt

=== By municipality ===
Municipality	Party	Votes	Elected mayor
Balzers	Progressive Citizens' Party	232	Fidel Brunhart
Eschen	Patriotic Union	164	Johann Georg Hasler
Gamprin	Progressive Citizens' Party	71	Martin Näscher
Mauren	Progressive Citizens' Party	218	Oswald Bühler
Planken	Progressive Citizens' Party	16	Gustav Jehle
Ruggell	Patriotic Union	140	Andreas Hoop
Schaan	Progressive Citizens' Party	227	Tobias Jehle
Schellenberg	Patriotic Union	55	Urban Rederer
Triesen	Patriotic Union	185	Ferdinand Heidegger
Triesenberg	Progressive Citizens' Party	152	Hans Gassner
Vaduz	Progressive Citizens' Party	291	David Strub
Source: Liechtensteiner Volksblatt
