= 1948 Liechtenstein local elections =

| ← 1945 | 25 January 1948 | 1951 → |
- Mayoral results by municipality

Local elections were held in Liechtenstein on 25 January 1948 to elect the municipal councils and the mayors of the eleven municipalities.

== Results ==
=== Summary ===
| Party | Mayors |
|---|---|
| Progressive Citizens' Party | 9 |
| Patriotic Union | 2 |
| Total | 11 |
Source: Liechtensteiner Volksblatt

=== By municipality ===
| Municipality | Party | Votes | Elected mayor |
|---|---|---|---|
| Balzers | Progressive Citizens' Party | 288 | Fidel Brunhart |
| Eschen | Progressive Citizens' Party | 169 | Josef Meier |
| Gamprin | Progressive Citizens' Party | 71 | Martin Näscher |
| Mauren | Progressive Citizens' Party | 161 | Oswald Bühler |
| Planken | Progressive Citizens' Party | 16 | Gustav Jehle |
| Ruggell | Progressive Citizens' Party | 125 | Ernst Büchel |
| Schaan | Progressive Citizens' Party | 299 | Tobias Jehle |
| Schellenberg | Patriotic Union | 81 | Urban Rederer |
| Triesen | Patriotic Union | 167 | Ferdinand Heidegger |
| Triesenberg | Progressive Citizens' Party | 167 | Johann Beck |
| Vaduz | Progressive Citizens' Party | 276 | David Strub |
Source: Liechtensteiner Volksblatt
