= 1960 Liechtenstein local elections =

← 1957	31 January 1960	1963 →
- Mayoral results by municipality

Local elections were held in Liechtenstein on 31 January 1960 to elect the municipal councils and the mayors of the eleven municipalities.

== Electoral system ==
Under the municipal law of 1959, the mayors of the respective municipalities were elected by a majority vote. The municipal councillors and their deputies were elected by open list proportional representation. Voters vote for a party list and then may strike through candidates they do not wish to cast a preferential vote for and may add names of candidates from other lists. Only men aged 20 or over were eligible to vote.

== Results ==
=== Summary ===
Party	Mayors
Progressive Citizens' Party	7
Patriotic Union	4
Total	11
Source: Liechtensteiner Volksblatt

=== By municipality ===
Municipality	Party	Votes	Elected mayor
Balzers	Patriotic Union	206	Walter Brunhart
Eschen	Patriotic Union	170	Johann Georg Hasler
Gamprin	Progressive Citizens' Party	71	Johann Georg Hasler
Mauren	Progressive Citizens' Party	208	Oswald Bühler
Planken	Progressive Citizens' Party		Gustav Jehle
Ruggell	Patriotic Union	115	Andreas Hoop
Schaan	Patriotic Union	320	Ludwig Beck
Schellenberg	Progressive Citizens' Party	65	Hugo Oehri
Triesen	Progressive Citizens' Party	188	Gabriel Negele
Triesenberg	Progressive Citizens' Party	193	Hans Gassner
Vaduz	Progressive Citizens' Party	338	David Strub
Source: Liechtensteiner Volksblatt
