= 1957 Liechtenstein general election =

- 1 September 1957
- 15 seats in the Landtag; 8 seats needed for a majority
- Turnout: 93.39% (▼0.02pp)
Party	Leader	Vote %	Seats	+/–
FBP	Alexander Frick	52.36	8	0
VU	Otto Schaedler	47.64	7	0
This lists parties that won seats. See the complete results below.
Results by constituency
Prime Minister before	Prime Minister after
Alexander Frick; FBP	Alexander Frick; FBP

General elections were held in Liechtenstein on 1 September 1957 to elect the 15 members of the Landtag. The Progressive Citizens' Party (FBP) won eight seats and retained its majority, while the Patriotic Union (VU) won seven. Voter turnout was 93.4%.

Following the elections, the coalition government between the FBP and VU led by prime minister Alexander Frick remained. The new government was sworn in on 31 December 1957. An electoral complaint was filed by the VU following the election, which resulted in a constitutional amendment and fresh elections being held in 1958.

== Background ==
In the June 1953 elections the Progressive Citizens' Party (FBP) retained its majority of eight seats, while the Patriotic Union (VU) won seven. The coalition government under the leadership of prime minister Alexander Frick remained. The elections had been called early due to the VU members of the Landtag walking out in protest of the FBP rejecting the former's demands to have a majority of the seven-member administrative composition of the old age and survivors' insurance (AHV).

Frick's third term in office oversaw land consolidation in 1956 to strengthen agriculture. It also saw adjustments to the border with Switzerland in 1955, and the signing of a double taxation agreement with Austria the following year.

== Electoral system ==
The 15 members of the Landtag were elected by open list proportional representation from two constituencies, Oberland with 9 seats and Unterland with 6 seats. Voters voted for a party list and then may have struck through candidates for whom they did not wish to cast a preferential vote, and may also have added names of candidates from other lists. The electoral threshold to win a seat was 18%. Landtag members sit for a four-year term. Once formed, the Landtag elected the prime minister and two government councillors who were then appointed by the reigning prince to govern in a cabinet. The prime minister is appointed for a six-year term, while government councillors sit a four-year term. Only men aged 21 and above were eligible to vote.

== Campaign ==
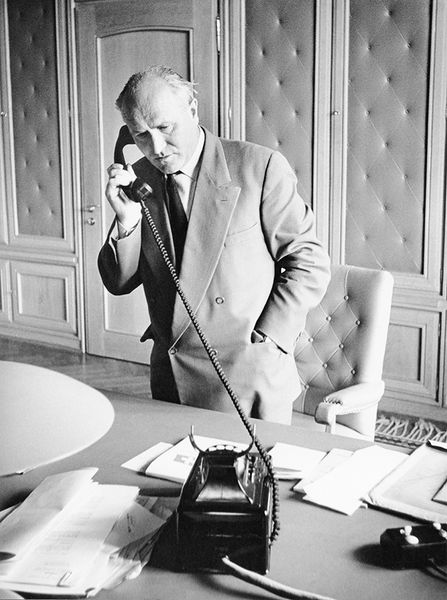
Alexander Frick, pictured in 1960

Both the FBP and VU campaigned on their respective party newspapers, the Liechtensteiner Volksblatt and Liechtensteiner Vaterland. The FBP accused the VU's programme of copying the former, specifically in regards to economic and social policy. Similarly, the FBP appealed to workers, farmers, and tradespeople while accusing the VU of intentionally withholding information from voters. The party campaigned on issues such as the construction of private housing, expanding health insurance, taxation reform, increasing pensions, and the establishment of an agricultural school. The party's candidate for prime minister was the incumbent Frick.

Conversely, the VU also criticized the FBP's programme for being vague and recycled from the VU's own policies. The party argued that Liechtenstein required a change in leadership, and that the VU was ready to assume government leadership. During campaigning, the party also appealed to workers and trade unionists, highlighting the party's achievements in improving worker conditions and claiming credit for the introduction of the AHV. The Volksblatt speculated that former deputy prime minister, Alois Vogt, was the VU's candidate for prime minister should it have won the election.

An electoral group, named the Workers’ and Farmers’ Party of the Liechtenstein Unterland (German: Arbeiter- und Bauernpartei des Liechtensteiner Unterlandes) was formed ahead of the election, but it was not allowed to contest as it did not meet electoral regulations.

== Candidates ==
Political parties in Liechtenstein required the support of 30 voters from a constituency to be eligible to nominate a candidate list in it. A total of 30 candidates contested the election.

Oberland	FBP	VU
Oberland	Josef Hoop; Martin Risch; Fidel Brunhart; Hans Gassner; Ernst Ospelt; Stefan Wachter; Franz Josef Schurte; Josef Büchel; Albert Laternser	Alois Ritter; Alois Ospelt; Andreas Vogt; Wendelin Beck; Josef Büchel; Johann Beck; Alois Vogt; Ludwig Beck; Josef Gassner
Unterland	FBP	VU
Unterland	Georg Oehri; Ernst Büchel; Leo Gerner; Josef Oehri; Engelbert Kranz; Alfons Büchel	Johann Georg Hasler; Alois Oehri; Gebhard Gerner; Paul Büchel; Felix Hasler; Paul Oehri
Source: Liechtensteiner Vaterland

== Results ==
The seat distribution remained unchanged from the June 1953 elections, with the FBP winning a majority of eight seats, whereas the VU won seven. Voter turnout was 93.39%.

Party	Votes	%	Seats	+/–
Progressive Citizens' Party	1,689	52.36	8	0
Patriotic Union	1,537	47.64	7	0
Total	3,226	100.00	15	0
Valid votes	3,226	98.00		
Invalid/blank votes	66	2.00		
Total votes	3,292	100.00		
Registered voters/turnout	3,525	93.39		
Source: Vogt

=== By electoral district ===
Electoral district	Seats	Electorate	Party	Elected members	Substitutes	Votes	%	Seats	+/–
Oberland	9	2,353	Patriotic Union	Alois Ritter; Johann Beck; Ludwig Beck; Josef Büchel; Andreas Vogt	Alois Vogt; Roman Gassner; Wendelin Beck	1,062	50.2	5	0
Oberland	9	2,353	Progressive Citizens' Party	Martin Risch; Josef Hoop; Hans Gassner; Stefan Wachter	Fidel Brunhart; Franz Josef Schurte; Josef Büchel	1,053	49.8	4	0
Unterland	6	1,172	Progressive Citizens' Party	Georg Oehri; Ernst Büchel; Leo Gerner; Josef Oehri	Engelbert Kranz; Alfons Büchel	636	57.2	4	0
Unterland	6	1,172	Patriotic Union	Alois Oehri; Johann Georg Hasler	Gebhard Gerner; Paul Büchel	475	42.8	2	0
Source: Vogt

== Aftermath ==
Following the elections, the coalition government between the FBP and VU under the leadership of Frick remained. The new government was sworn in on 31 December 1957. Josef Hoop of the FBP was elected as President of the Landtag upon the first session of the newly elected Landtag on 12 November 1957, with Johann Georg Hasler of the VU as vice president.

The VU filed an electoral complaint following the election, alleging that citizens who had given up their residency in the country were allowed to vote in the Unterland electoral district. The FBP rejected this demand in the Landtag, but at the request of Franz Joseph II, Prince of Liechtenstein both parties agreed to amended the constitution to make it so that the Liechtenstein state court would decide on electoral complaints instead of the Landtag. The amendment also made it so that scheduled elections must be held in February or March. As per the agreement, fresh elections were held in 1958.
