= Eugen Hasler =

Liechtenstein politician (1911–1981)

Member of the Landtag of Liechtenstein for Unterland
- In office 1 February 1970 – 3 February 1974

Personal details
- Born: 12 December 1911 Schellenberg, Liechtenstein
- Died: 15 February 1981 (aged 69) Schellenberg, Liechtenstein
- Party: Patriotic Union
- Spouse: Katharina Büchel (m. 1938; died 1970)
- Children: 5

Eugen Hasler (12 December 1911 – 15 February 1981) was an industrial worker and politician from Liechtenstein who served in the Landtag of Liechtenstein from 1970 to 1974.

== Life ==
He worked as an industrial worker and farmer, including on the construction of the Liechtenstein inland canal. During World War II, he worked in a power plant in Feldkirch. He worked as a mechanic and an electrician in a boiler manufacturing company in Bendern from 1949 to 1981, and was then water master of Schellenberg from 1970.

Hasler was a deputy member of the Landtag of Liechtenstein from 1966 to 1970 as a member of the Patriotic Union, and then a full member from 1970 to 1974. During this time, he was also briefly the Landtag's secretary. He was a member of the Schellenberg municipal council from 1960 to 1963 and again from 1969 to 1979, also serving as a deputy member of the Landtag from 1966 to 1970.

Hasler married Katharina Büchel (3 October 1917 – 26 December 1970) on 19 April 1938 and they had five children together. In his latter life, his health declined and his farm was taken over by his son in 1968. He died of an illness on 15 February 1981, aged 69.

== Bibliography ==
- Vogt, Paul (1987). 125 Jahre Landtag (in German). Vaduz: Landtag of the Principality of Liechtenstein.
