= Oehri =

Oehri or Oehry is a surname. Notable people with the surname include:

- Alois Oehri (1918–1997), Liechtenstein politician
- Donath Oehri (born 1959), Liechtenstein politician
- Eduard Oehri (1903–1994), Liechtenstein politician
- Georg Oehri (1905–1987), Liechtenstein politician
- Egon Oehri (born 1940), Liechtensteiner middle-distance runner
- Daniel Oehry (born 1971), Liechtenstein politician
- Ralf Oehri (born 1976), Liechtensteiner footballer
- Stefan Öhri (born 1976), Liechtenstein politician
- Yves Oehri (born 1987), Liechtensteiner footballer

== See also ==
- Oeri
