= Kindle (surname) =

Kindle is a surname. Notable people with the surname include:

- Florian Kindle (1907–1994), Liechtenstein politician
- Samuel Kindle (1924–2009), Liechtenstein politician
- Herbert Kindle (1929–2009), Liechtenstein politician
- Paul Kindle (1930–2016), President of the Landtag of Liechtenstein
- Hermann Kindle (born 1935), skier from Liechtenstein
- Silvan Kindle (1936–2025), alpine skier from Liechtenstein
- Johann Kindle (born 1944), Liechtenstein politician
- Greg Kindle (born 1950), American player of gridiron football
- Jolanda Kindle (born 1965) alpine skier from Liechtenstein
- Elmar Kindle (born 1968), Liechtenstein engineer and politician
- Marion Kindle-Kühnis (born 1979), Liechtenstein politician
- Carmen Heeb-Kindle (born 1985), Liechtenstein teacher and politician
- Sergio Kindle (born 1987), American football player
- Nicola Kindle (born 1991), skier from Liechtenstein
