= Kindle =

Kindle may refer to:

== Companies and products ==
- Amazon Kindle, an e-reader line by Amazon.com
  - Kindle Direct Publishing, an e-book publishing platform by Amazon
  - Kindle Store, an online e-book e-commerce store by Amazon
  - Kindle File Format, the file format used by Kindle e-readers
- Kindle Banking Systems, a company that produced banking software
- Kindle Entertainment, a children's television production company based in London, England

== Other uses ==
- Kindle (surname)
- Generation Kindle, authors who publish their works digitally through Kindle Direct Publishing
- Kindle County, a fictional US county in novels by Scott Turow
- Kris Kindle or Secret Santa, a Western Christmas tradition

== See also ==
- Amazon Fire, formerly known as Kindle Fire, a tablet line by Amazon
- Kindling (disambiguation)
