= 1945 Liechtenstein local elections =

← 1942	28 January 1945	1948 →
- Mayoral results by municipality

Local elections were held in Liechtenstein on 28 January 1945 to elect the municipal councils and the mayors of the eleven municipalities.

== Results ==
=== Summary ===
Party	Mayors
Progressive Citizens' Party	9
Patriotic Union	2
Total	11
Source: Rechenschafts-Bericht

=== By municipality ===
Municipality	Party	Elected mayor
Balzers	Progressive Citizens' Party	Fidel Brunhart
Eschen	Progressive Citizens' Party	Josef Meier
Gamprin	Progressive Citizens' Party	Martin Näscher
Mauren	Progressive Citizens' Party	David Meier
Planken	Progressive Citizens' Party	Gustav Jehle
Ruggell	Progressive Citizens' Party	Ernst Büchel
Schaan	Progressive Citizens' Party	Tobias Jehle
Schellenberg	Patriotic Union	Urban Rederer
Triesen	Patriotic Union	Ferdinand Heidegger
Triesenberg	Progressive Citizens' Party	Johann Beck
Vaduz	Progressive Citizens' Party	David Strub
Source: Rechenschafts-Bericht
