= Johann Georg Hasler (politician, born 1822) =

Mayor of Gamprin from 1867 to 1868

Mayor of Gamprin
- In office 1867–1868
- Preceded by: Johann Georg Näscher
- Succeeded by: Adam Hasler

Personal details
- Born: 10 November 1822 Bendern, Liechtenstein
- Died: 21 July 1869 (aged 46) Bendern, Liechtenstein
- Spouse: Anna Maria Hasler (m. 1850)
- Children: 4

Johann Georg Hasler (10 November 1822 – 21 July 1869) was a politician from Liechtenstein who served as the mayor of Gamprin from 1867 to 1868.

Hasler resigned as mayor in 1868 and was succeeded by his brother-in-law Adam Hasler on 9 May 1868.
