= Hans Gassner =

Hans Gassner may refer to:

- Hans Gassner (1898–1973), Mayor of Triesenberg and member of the Landtag of Liechtenstein
- Hans Gassner (1937–2020), Liechtenstein government councillor
