= Meinrad Ospelt =

Meinrad Ospelt may refer to:

- Meinrad Ospelt (politician, born 1844) (1844–1934), Liechtenstein politician
- Meinrad Ospelt (politician, born 1906) (1906–1983), Liechtenstein politician
