= Der Liechtensteiner =

Defunct weekly newspaper in Liechtenstein

- Front cover of the print edition, 11 February 1966
- Publisher: Presseverein Der Liechtensteiner
- Founded: 1 May 1964; 62 years ago
- Ceased publication: 10 September 1976; 50 years ago
- Political alignment: Christian Social Party
- Language: German
- Country: Liechtenstein

Der Liechtensteiner (lit. 'The Liechtensteiner'), renamed to the Liechtensteiner Wochenspiegel (lit. 'Liechtenstein Weekly Mirror') in 1971, was a weekly newspaper published in Liechtenstein from 1964 to 1976. It was the unofficial newspaper of the Christian Social Party for the majority of its publication.

== History ==
Der Liechtensteiner was first published on 1 May 1964 and was published by Presseverein Der Liechtensteiner, managed by Fritz Kaiser, a leading figure of the Christian Social Party (CSP). Perusing Investigative journalism, the newspaper particularly criticized the dominance between the Progressive Citizens' Party and Patriotic Union parties while also acting as a mouthpiece for issues in the country. The paper itself was considered the unofficial party newspaper of the CSP.

The paper was relaunched in 1971 and renamed to the Liechtensteiner Wochenspiegel. In 1973, a new editorial team briefly attempted to steer the paper to a politically neutral stance, but this failed after only five issues as the CSP forced the newspaper to publish a party statement regarding the proposed electoral reforms in the 1973 referendums. Following the dissolution of the CSP in 1974, the newspaper again attempted to continue under a politically neutral stance but ceased publication on 10 September 1976 due to financial reasons.
