= Alfons Büchel =

Liechtenstein politician (1910–1990)

Member of the Landtag of Liechtenstein for Unterland
- In office 23 March 1958 – 25 March 1962

Personal details
- Born: 19 July 1910 Mauren, Liechtenstein
- Died: 16 January 1990 (aged 79) Mauren, Liechtenstein
- Party: Progressive Citizens' Party
- Spouse: Mathilde Ritter (m. 1939)
- Relations: Johann Anton Büchel (uncle)
- Parent(s): Peter Büchel; Paulina Kaiser

Alfons Büchel (19 July 1910 – 16 January 1990) was a politician from Liechtenstein who served in the Landtag of Liechtenstein from 1958 to 1962.

He worked as the postmaster in Triesenberg from 1939 until his retirement in Mauren. He was a deputy member of the Landtag from 1957 to 1958 and again from 1962 to 1966. In addition, he was a deputy government councillor from 1957 to 1958. He was a member of the press association of the Liechtensteiner Vaterland.

== Bibliography ==
- Vogt, Paul (1987). 125 Jahre Landtag (in German). Vaduz: Landtag of the Principality of Liechtenstein.
