= Meinrad Ospelt (politician, born 1906) =

Liechtenstein politician (1906–1983)

- Obituary portrait

Member of the Landtag of Liechtenstein for Oberland
- In office 23 March 1958 – 6 February 1966

Mayor of Vaduz
- In office 1966–1972
- Preceded by: David Strub
- Succeeded by: Hilmar Ospelt

Personal details
- Born: 24 December 1906 Vaduz, Liechtenstein
- Died: 11 January 1983 (aged 76) Vaduz, Liechtenstein
- Party: Progressive Citizens' Party
- Spouse: Maria Beck (m. 1938)

Meinrad Ospelt (24 December 1906 – 11 January 1983) was a blacksmith and politician from Liechtenstein who served in the Landtag of Liechtenstein from 1958 to 1966. A member of the Progressive Citizens' Party (FBP), he later served as the mayor of Vaduz from 1966 to 1972.

== Life ==
Ospelt was born on 24 December 1906 in Vaduz as the son of Anton Ospelt and Ludwina (née Ospelt) as one of twelve children. He worked as a blacksmith, and opened his own shop in Vaduz in 1938.

He was a member of the Vaduz municipal council from 1936 to 1960 as a member of the Progressive Citizens' Party (FBP), and was also deputy mayor of the municipality from 1948 to 1960. He was a member of the Landtag of Liechtenstein from 1966 to 1972. During this time, he was briefly also the Landtag's secretary. After leaving the Landtag, Ospelt served as the mayor of Vaduz from 1966 to 1972.

He was the president of the Harmoniemusik Vaduz from 1934 to 1955 and again from 1958 to 1959. He was also president of the Liechtenstein Music Association from 1940 to 1949. He was the commander of the Vaduz fire brigade from 1948 to 1960 and also the national fire commander from 1951 to 1960.

Ospelt married Maria Beck (7 February 1915 – 17 April 1986), the daughter of Johann Beck, on 28 April 1938 and they had three children together. He died on 11 January 1983 in Vaduz, aged 76.

== Bibliography ==
- Vogt, Paul (1987). 125 Jahre Landtag (in German). Vaduz: Landtag of the Principality of Liechtenstein.
