= Franz Vogt (politician) =

Liechtenstein politician (1918–2001)

Member of the Landtag of Liechtenstein for Oberland
- In office 23 February 1950 – 15 February 1953
- Preceded by: Heinrich Andreas Brunhart

Personal details
- Born: 11 February 1918 Balzers, Liechtenstein
- Died: 13 April 2001 (aged 83) Balzers, Liechtenstein
- Party: Patriotic Union
- Spouse: Mathilda Hasler (m. 1951)
- Children: 4

Franz Vogt-Hasler (11 February 1918 – 13 April 2001) was a politician from Liechtenstein who served in the Landtag of Liechtenstein from 1950 to 1953.

== Life ==
Vogt was born on 11 February 1918 in Balzers as the son of Basil Vogt and Elisabeth Wolfinger as one of three children. He conducted an carpentry apprenticeship in Balzers before attending higher state trade school in Innsbruck. He worked as a farmer, carpenter, and ran a planning office. He took over his father's carpentry business upon his death in 1939, and expanded it to include a sawmill and joinery..

He was a member of the Balzers municipal council from 1942 to 1945 as a member of the Patriotic Union. He was deputy mayor of Balzers from 1949 to 1950 and again from 1966 to 1970. Vogt was elected as a deputy member of the Landtag of Liechtenstein in 1949, but then succeeded Heinrich Andreas Brunhart as a full member upon his death in 1950. He was again a deputy member from 1966 to 1970.

Vogt married Mathilda Hasler (20 June 1920 – 24 November 2005) on 14 June 1951 and they had four children together. He died on 13 April 2001, aged 83.

== Bibliography ==
- Vogt, Paul (1987). 125 Jahre Landtag (in German). Vaduz: Landtag of the Principality of Liechtenstein.
