= Herbert Kindle =

Liechtenstein politician (1929–2009)

Member of the Landtag of Liechtenstein for Oberland
- In office 1 February 1970 – 3 February 1978

Personal details
- Born: 18 April 1929 Hohenems, Austria
- Died: 9 September 2009 (aged 80) Vaduz, Liechtenstein
- Party: Patriotic Union
- Spouse: Marlen Eberle (m. 1964)
- Relations: Paul Kindle (brother); Samuel Kindle (brother)
- Children: 3

Herbert Kindle (18 April 1929 – 9 September 2009) was a banker and politician from Liechtenstein who served in the Landtag of Liechtenstein from 1970 to 1978.

== Life ==
Kindle was born on 18 April 1929 in Hohenems as the son of electrician Lorenz Kindle and Maria (née) Banzer as one of five children. He conducted a commercial apprenticeship in Vaduz and then from 1948 to 1959 worked as a commercial employee in Liechtenstein, Zurich, Lausanne, Paris and Brussels. He was the managing director of the Liechtenstein Chamber of Industry and Commerce (LIHK) from 1959 to 1992.

He was a member of the Triesen municipal council from 1960 to 1963 as a member of the Patriotic Union (VU). He was a member of the Landtag of Liechtenstein from 1970 to 1978. During this time, he was the VU's spokesperson in the Landtag from 1974 to 1978.

Kindle was the president of board of directors of the National Bank of Liechtenstein from 1970 to 1974 and again from 1978 to 1988. He wrote various articles regarding the economy of Liechtenstein.

Kindle married Marlen Eberle on 22 August 1964 and they had three children together. His brothers Samuel and Paul also served in the Landtag. He died of an illness on 9 September 2009, aged 80. He was from Triesen.

== Bibliography ==
- Vogt, Paul (1987). 125 Jahre Landtag (in German). Vaduz: Landtag of the Principality of Liechtenstein.
