= Egon Marxer =

Mayor of Eschen from 1972 to 1987

Mayor of Eschen
- In office 1972–1987
- Deputy: Werner Gstöhl
- Preceded by: Alban Meier
- Succeeded by: Beat Marxer

Personal details
- Born: 7 February 1920
- Died: 17 March 1999 (aged 79) Nendeln, Liechtenstein
- Party: Patriotic Union
- Other political affiliations: German National Movement in Liechtenstein
- Spouse: Annelies Gassner (m. 1949)

Military service
- Allegiance: Nazi Germany
- Branch: Waffen-SS
- Battles/wars: World War II: Eastern Front

Egon Marxer (7 February 1920 – 17 March 1999) was a politician from Liechtenstein who served as the mayor of Eschen from 1972 to 1987. He was previously a volunteer member of the Waffen-SS during World War II.

== Life ==
Marxer was born on 7 February 1920 as the son of Rudolf Marxer and Theresia Wohlwend as one of three children. In May 1938, he joined the German National Movement in Liechtenstein as a member of its youth movement, and he participated in the 1939 Liechtenstein putsch as a chauffeur. During World War II, he volunteered as a member of the Waffen-SS and was deployed to the Eastern Front.

In 1946, Marxer was convicted of high treason against Liechtenstein, and was sentenced to 2.5 years in prison. Following his release, he owned a grocery store and worked in various industrial companies. He was mayor of Eschen from 1972 to 1987 as a member of the Patriotic Union. During this time, a primary school was built in Nendeln, a sports park was built, and the Eschen Parish Church was renovated.

Marxer married Annelies Gassner (26 July 1926 – 19 January 2008) on 4 August 1949. He died in an accident on 17 March 1999, aged 79 years old.
