= Johann Georg Hasler (politician, born 1826) =

Mayor of Eschen from 1876 to 1879

Member of the Landtag of Liechtenstein
- In office 1877–1878

Mayor of Eschen
- In office 1876–1879
- Preceded by: Andreas Batliner
- Succeeded by: Martin Öhri

Personal details
- Born: 7 November 1826 Eschen, Liechtenstein
- Died: 13 February 1883 (aged 56) Eschen, Liechtenstein
- Spouse: Maria Barbara Risch (m. 1864)
- Children: 5

Johann Georg Hasler (7 November 1826 – 13 February 1883) was a politician from Liechtenstein who served in the Landtag of Liechtenstein from 1877 to 1878. He previously served as mayor of Eschen from 1876 to 1879.

From 1864 to 1867 and again from 1873 to 1876 he was the municipal treasurer of Eschen. He resigned his seat in the Landtag following the coinage crisis in 1878.

== Bibliography ==
- Vogt, Paul (1987). 125 Jahre Landtag (in German). Vaduz: Landtag of the Principality of Liechtenstein.
