= List of mayors of Eschen =

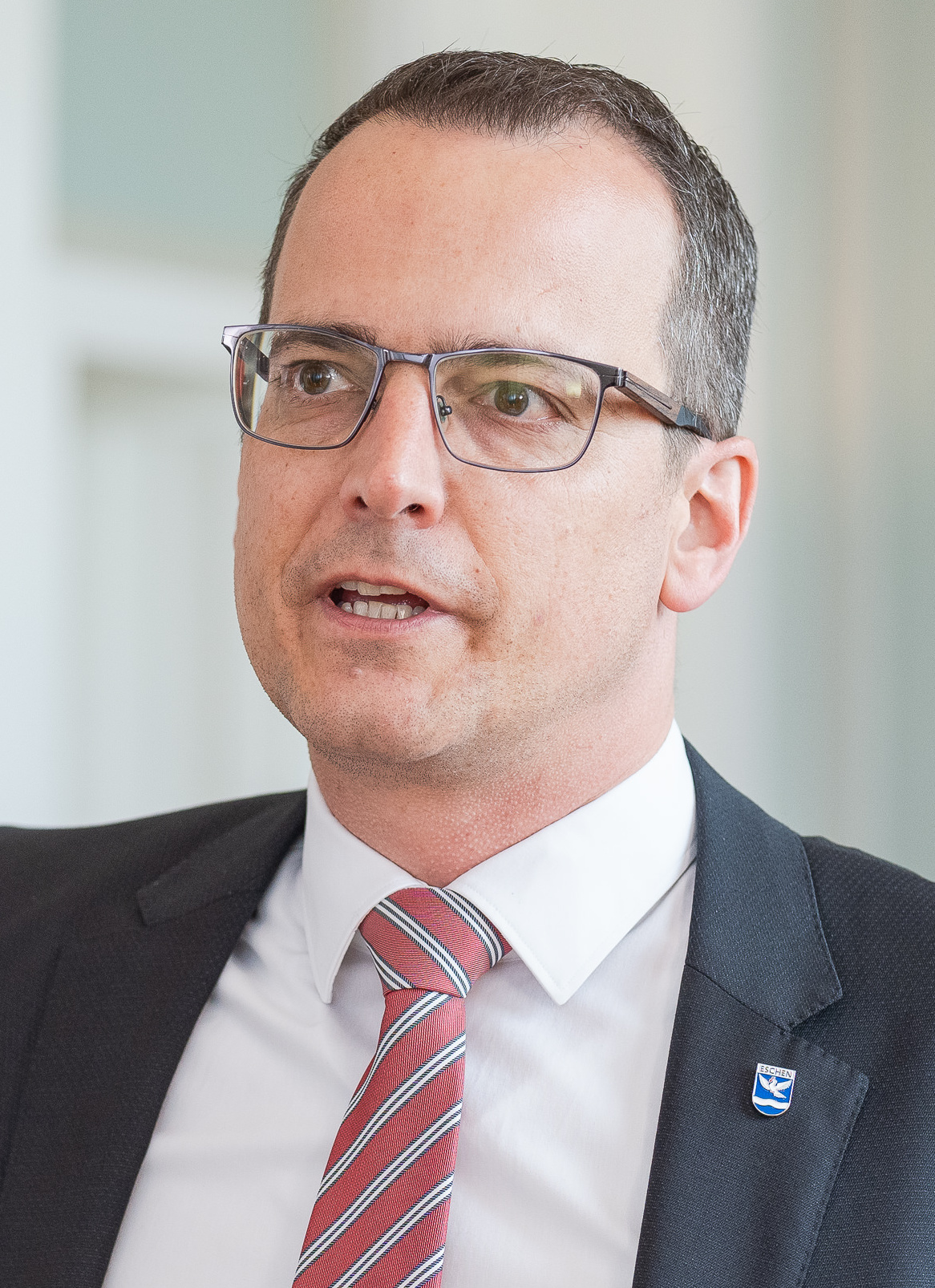
Tino Quaderer, the incumbent mayor of Eschen

The mayor of Eschen is the head of the Eschen municipal government. The role has existed since the introduction of the Liechtenstein municipal law of 1864.

The incumbent mayor is Tino Quaderer, since 2019.

== List of mayors (1864–present) ==
List of mayorsList of mayors (1864–present)
No. (Note: People are numbered according to periods served by the same person. For example, Martin Öhri served as mayor for two non-consecutive terms, but is counted only once.)	Name	Term	Party	Ref(s).
1	Franz Josef Schlegel	1864–1870	—	
2	Martin Öhri	1870–1873	—	
3	Andreas Batliner	1873–1876	—	
4	Johann Georg Hasler	1876–1879	—	
(1)	Martin Öhri	1879–1882	—	
1	Johann Gstöhl	1882–1888	—	
(1)	Martin Öhri	1888–1889	—	
5	Ludwig Marxer	1889–1898	—	
6	Rochus Schafhauser	1898–1903	—	
7	Johann Gstöhl	1903–1912	—	
8	Franz Josef Marxer	1912–1918	—	
9	Josef Marxer	1918–1933	FBP	
10	Josef Meier	1933–1951	FBP	
11	Johann Georg Hasler	1951–1963	VU	
12	Franz Meier	1963–1969	VU	
13	Alban Meier	1969–1972	FBP	
14	Egon Marxer	1972–1987	VU	
15	Beat Marxer	1987–1991	FBP	
16	Günther Wohlwend	1991–1999	VU	
17	Gregor Ott	1999–2011	FBP	
18	Günther Kranz	2011–2019	VU	
19	Tino Quaderer	2019–present	FBP	

== See also ==
- Eschen
