= 1969 Liechtenstein local elections =

← 1966	26 January 1969	1972 →
- Mayoral results by municipality

Local elections were held in Liechtenstein on 26 January 1969 to elect the municipal councils and the mayors of the eleven municipalities.

== Electoral system ==
Under the municipal law of 1959, the mayors of the respective municipalities were elected by a majority vote. The municipal councillors and their deputies were elected by open list proportional representation. Voters vote for a party list and then may strike through candidates they do not wish to cast a preferential vote for and may add names of candidates from other lists. Only men aged 20 or over were eligible to vote.

== Results ==
=== Summary ===
Party	Mayors
Progressive Citizens' Party	8
Patriotic Union	3
Total	11
Source: Liechtensteiner Volksblatt

=== By municipality ===
Municipality	Party	Votes	Elected mayor
Balzers	Progressive Citizens' Party	328	Emanuel Vogt
Eschen	Progressive Citizens' Party	188	Alban Meier
Gamprin	Patriotic Union	77	Alois Oehri
Mauren	Progressive Citizens' Party	190	Werner Matt
Planken	Progressive Citizens' Party	20	Anton Nägele
Ruggell	Progressive Citizens' Party	117	Hugo Oehri
Schaan	Progressive Citizens' Party	307	Walter Beck
Schellenberg	Progressive Citizens' Party	69	Hugo Oehri
Triesen	Patriotic Union	203	Rudolf Kindle
Triesenberg	Patriotic Union	300	Alfons Schädler
Vaduz	Progressive Citizens' Party	329	Meinrad Ospelt
Source: Liechtensteiner Volksblatt
