= Franz Nägele =

Liechtenstein politician (1918–2011)

Member of the Landtag of Liechtenstein for Unterland
- In office 25 March 1962 – 3 February 1978

Personal details
- Born: 3 September 1918 Nendeln, Liechtenstein
- Died: 6 April 2011 (aged 92) Vaduz, Liechtenstein
- Party: Patriotic Union
- Spouse: Elsa Matt (m. 1945; died 2008)
- Relations: Johannes Hasler (grandson)
- Children: 6

Franz Nägele (3 September 1918 – 6 April 2011) was a politician from Liechtenstein who served in the Landtag of Liechtenstein from 1962 to 1978. He also served as the president of the Patriotic Union from 1965 to 1974.

== Life ==
Nägele was born on 3 September 1918 in Nendeln as the son of farmer and innkeeper Johann Nägele and Theresia (née Beck) as one of ten children. He attended high school in Feldkirch and then studied medicine in Munich, where he received a doctorate in dentistry. From 1943, he ran his own dental practice in Eschen. From 1950 to 1954 he was the president of Harmoniemusik Eschen.

From 1957 to 1963 he was a member of the Eschen municipal council as a member of the Patriotic Union. From 1958 to 1962 he was a deputy member of the Landtag of Liechtenstein, and a full member from 1962 to 1978. During this time, he was a member of the finance, audit and state committees. He was also the Vice president of the Landtag of Liechtenstein from 1966 to 1970. He was the vice president of the Patriotic Union from 1961 to 1965 and then its president from 1965 to 1974. From 1959 to 1969 and again from 1985 to 1989 he was a judge at the Liechtenstein state court.

In the run-up to the 2003 Liechtenstein constitutional referendum, Nägele alongside other former members of the Landtag, opposed the proposed changes by the prince.

Nägele married Elsa Matt (16 September 1920 – 13 April 2008) on 29 November 1945 and they had six children together. He died on 6 April 2011 in Vaduz, aged 92. His grandson Johannes Hasler also served in the Landtag.

== Honours ==
- Liechtenstein: Grand Cross of the Order of Merit of the Principality of Liechtenstein

== Bibliography ==
- Vogt, Paul (1987). 125 Jahre Landtag (in German). Vaduz: Landtag of the Principality of Liechtenstein.
