= Oeri =

Oeri is a Swiss surname. Notable people with this surname include:

- Albert Oeri (1875–1950), Swiss journalist and politician
- Gisela Oeri (born 1955), Swiss-German football chairwoman
- Hans Jakob Oeri (1782–1868), Swiss painter
- Maja Oeri (born 1955), Swiss billionaire

== See also ==
- Oehri
