= Johannes Hasler =

Liechtenstein politician (born 1982)

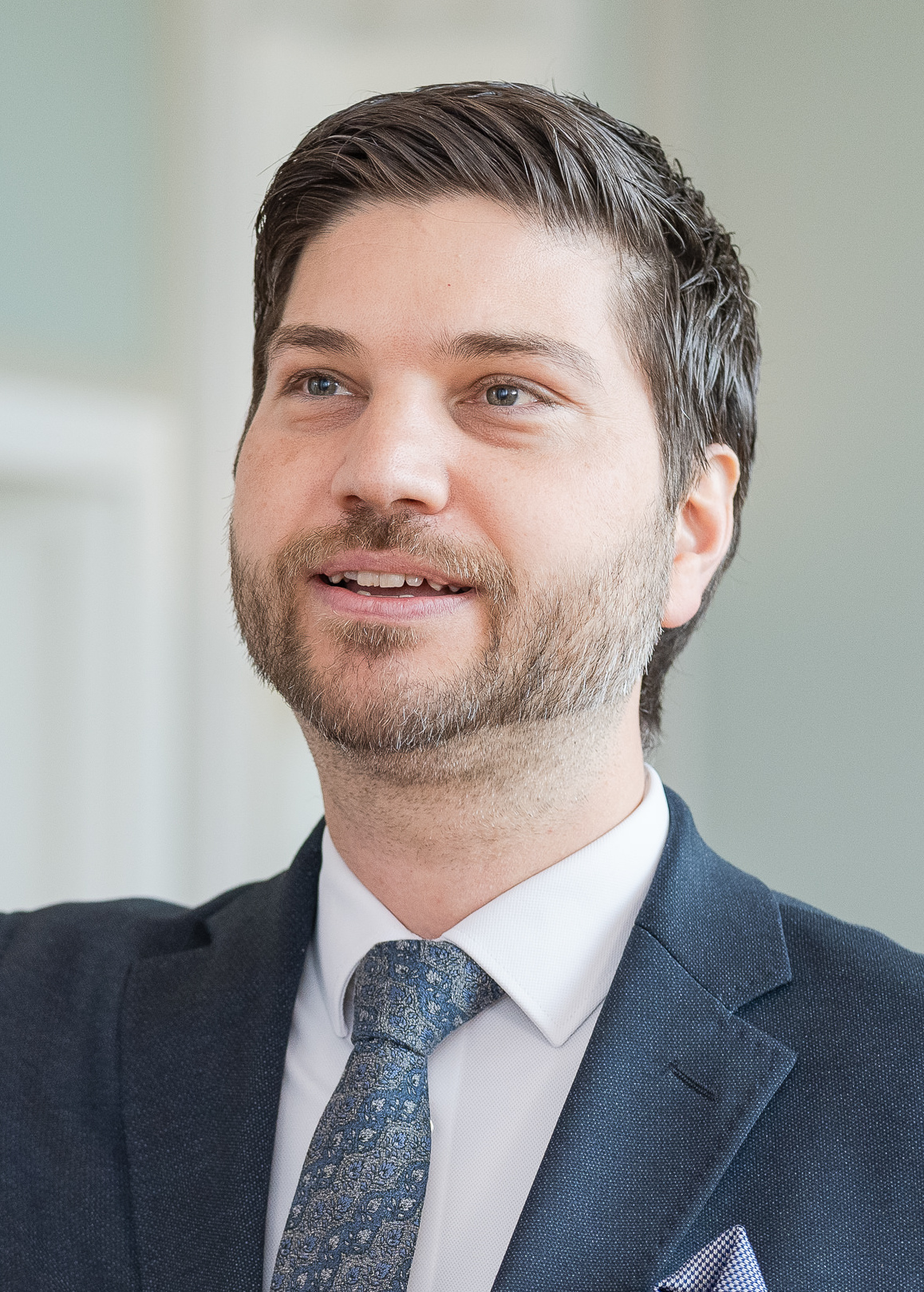
- Hasler in 2023

Member of the Landtag of Liechtenstein for Unterland
- In office 5 February 2017 – 31 October 2019
- Succeeded by: Alexander Batliner

Mayor of Gamprin
- Incumbent
- Assumed office 1 May 2019
- Deputy: Barbara Kind
- Preceded by: Donath Oehri

Personal details
- Born: 10 June 1982 (age 44) Vaduz, Liechtenstein
- Party: Progressive Citizens' Party
- Spouse: Daniela Schädler (m. 2007)
- Relations: Franz Nägele (grandfather)
- Children: 2

Johannes Halser (born 10 June 1982) is a police officer and politician who served in the Landtag of Liechtenstein from 2017 to 2019. He has also served as mayor of Gamprin since 2019.

== Life ==
Hasler was born on 10 June 1982 in Vaduz as the son of psychologist Werner Hasler and gerontologist Hedwig (née Nägele) as one of five children. He is the grandson of Franz Nägele. He attended commercial school in Feldkirch and then a police academy in Switzerland from 2002 to 2003. He received a diploma in trust management at the University of Liechtenstein in 2009 and then a diploma in entrepreneurial management in 2012 at the same university.

From 2003 to 2019, he was a member of the Liechtenstein National Police, primarily as an economic and financial investigator. He was the chairman of the local group of the Progressive Citizens' Party (FBP) in Gamprin from 2014 to 2019. He was a member of the Landtag of Liechtenstein from 2017 to 2019 and also a member of the Liechtenstein delegation to the Inter-Parliamentary Union. During this time, in May 2018 he and deputy member Alexander Batliner got into a dispute with deputy prime minister Daniel Risch, where they had accused Risch of misleading the Landtag, but the dispute was ultimately settled the following month.

Hasler ran for mayor of Gamprin in the 2019 elections, announcing his candidacy in October 2018. During campaigning, he did not specify whether he would continue serving in the Landtag should he be elected. He was elected to the position unopposed. Hasler resigned from the Landtag on 31 October 2019 to focus on his duties as mayor, and was succeeded by Batliner. Hasler was re-elected as mayor unopposed in 2023.

Hasler married Daniela Schädler, a civil engineer, on 19 January 2007 and they have two children together. He lives in Gamprin.
