= Constitutional Court (Liechtenstein) =

The Constitutional Court (German: Staatsgerichtshof, pronounced [ˈʃtaːtsɡəˌʁɪçtshoːf]) of Liechtenstein is the ultimate legal authority in Liechtenstein. It is based in the capital, Vaduz. The court is a court of public law that is autonomous and independent from all other constitutional bodies.

== Legal basis ==
The Court is established by Article 104 of the 1921 Constitution of Liechtenstein. The detailed rules governing its operation are found in the Law of 27 November 2003 on the Constitutional Court (original German title: Gesetz vom 27. November 2003 über den Staatsgerichtshof (StGHG)) and the Rules of Procedure of the Constitutional Court of the Principality of Liechtenstein of 4 February 2019 (Geschäftsordnung des Staatsgerichtshofes des Fürstentums Liechtenstein vom 4. Februar 2019).

== Composition ==
The Constitutional Court consists of five judges and five substitute judges (art 1, para 3), all of whom work part-time. The term of office of the judges and substitute judges of the Constitutional Court is five years (art. 3 para. 1). Subject to his right of resignation, a judge of the Constitutional Court can only be appointed or removed from office by the Constitutional Court itself (art. 12 para. 1). The Constitutional Court issues its own rules of procedure (art. 14). The President of the Constitutional Court and the majority of the judges must be Liechtenstein citizens (nationality).

As of August 2025, the judges of the Courts are:

- Hilmar Hoch: President since 2018, previously (2005-2018) Vice-President of the Constitutional Court, and (1994-2005) a judge of the Court. since 1993 and deputy president since 2005.
- Christian Ritter: Vice-President since 2018, previously (2015-2018) a judge of the Constitutional Court and (1997-2001) a judge of the Princely Court of Justice.
- Peter Bussjäger: judge since 2009, previously (2005-2009) a judge of the Supreme Administrative Court.
- Marco Ender: judge since 2021, previously (2017-2020) a substitute judge of the Constitutional Court.
- Benjamin Schindler: judge since 2024, previously (2012-2023) a substitute judge of the Constitutional Court.

The substitute judges are:

- Anna Gamper
- Franziska Goop-Monauni
- Michael Kranz
- Remo Mairhofer
- Daniela Thurnherr Keller

== Functions ==
As the Constitutional Court of the Principality of Liechtenstein, the Court ensures that all authorities comply with the fundamental rights guaranteed in the Constitution. Main functions:

- Protection of constitutionally guaranteed rights;
- Examination of the constitutionality of laws and treaties as well as the constitutionality, legality and treaty-related conformity of regulations;
- Decision on conflicts of jurisdiction between courts and administrative authorities;
- Decision on electoral complaints;
- Decision on ministerial impeachments; Safeguarding of other tasks defined in more detail by law on the basis of the constitution.
- Examination of the constitutionality of laws and treaties as well as the constitutionality, legality and treaty-relatedness of regulations;
- Decision on conflicts of jurisdiction between courts and administrative authorities;
- Decision on electoral complaints;
- Decision on ministerial impeachments; Safeguarding of other tasks defined in more detail by law on the basis of the constitution.

== Review of international treaties ==
The competence of the Constitutional Court to subsequently review the constitutionality of international treaties or individual provisions of international treaties (Article 22) that have already been legally concluded by the Principality of Liechtenstein is disputed in legal theory, since in international law, among other things, the principle of Pacta sunt servanda applies (see also the "Schubert practice" of the Swiss Federal Supreme Court).

This review authority of the Constitutional Court is considered to be very problematic, particularly in view of the Principality's integration into the European Economic Area (EEA). According to Article 23 paragraph 1 of the Constitutional Court Act, if the Constitutional Court finds that an international treaty or individual provisions thereof are incompatible with the constitution, it can revoke the domestic binding nature of the treaty. This could lead to a domestic court having subsequent review authority with regard to EEA law and undermine the primacy of EEA law, but the EEA process for incorporating EU law has generally proven to be robust.
