= Kindling =

Kindling may refer to:

- Kindling, material for firelighting

== Arts and entertainment ==
- Kindling (1915 film), a film by Cecil B. DeMille
- Kindling (2023 film), a British drama film
- Kindling (album), a 1973 album by Gene Parsons
- Kindling (Farren novel), a 2004 Flame of Evil novel by Mick Farren
- Kindling (Shute novel), or Ruined City, a 1938 novel by Nevil Shute
- Vendhu Thanindhathu Kaadu: Part I – The Kindling, a 2022 Indian film

== Neuroscience ==
- Kindling (sedative–hypnotic withdrawal)
- Kindling model of epilepsy
