= Paul Kindle =

President of the Landtag of Liechtenstein (1993–1994, 1996)

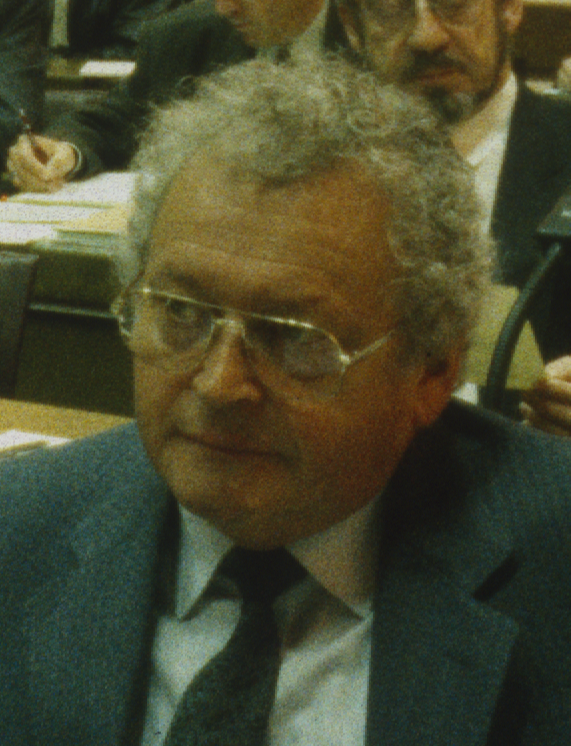
- Kindle in 1991

President of the Landtag of Liechtenstein
- In office January 1996 – December 1996
- Monarch: Hans Adam II
- Vice President: Otmar Hasler
- Preceded by: Otmar Hasler
- Succeeded by: Peter Wolff
- In office October 1993 – December 1994
- Monarch: Hans-Adam II
- Vice President: Otmar Hasler
- Preceded by: Ernst Walch
- Succeeded by: Otmar Hasler

Member of the Landtag of Liechtenstein for Oberland
- In office 7 February 1982 – 2 February 1997

Personal details
- Born: 4 May 1930 Hohenems, Austria
- Died: 22 December 2016 (aged 86) Triesen, Liechtenstein
- Party: Patriotic Union
- Spouse: Hedwig Dorasil (m. 1955)
- Relations: Samuel Kindle (brother); Herbert Kindle (brother)
- Children: 3

Paul Kindle (4 May 1930 – 22 December 2016) was a politician from Liechtenstein who served as the president of the Landtag of Liechtenstein from 1993 to 1994 and again in 1996. He served in the Landtag from 1982 to 1997.

== Life ==
Kindle was born on 4 May 1930 in Hohenems as the son of electrician Lorenz Kindle and Maria Banzer as one of five children. He conducted an apprenticeship as a machine fitter at Elastin AG in Triesen. He worked at as a technical director at Elastin-Werk AG and then later at Swarovski AG in Triesen.

From 1978 to 1982 he was a deputy government councillor in the first Hans Brunhart cabinet as a member of the Patriotic Union. From 1982 to 1997 he was a member of the Landtag of Liechtenstein. From October 1993 to December 1994 he was President of the Landtag of Liechtenstein, then vice president in from January to December 1995 and again president from January to December 1996. During his time in the Landtag, he was the chairman of the foreign affairs commission and head of the Liechtenstein delegation to the Parliamentary Assembly of the Council of Europe. He was vice president of the assembly from 1989 to 1990, and from 1991 was an honorary member.

Kindle was a board member of the Liechtenstein Philatelists' Association. He designed three Liechtenstein stamps, and was awarded a plaque by the government for his contributions to Liechtenstein's philately.

He married Hedwig Dorasil on 31 May 1955 and they had three children together. His brothers Samuel and Herbert also served in the Landtag. He died on 22 December 2016 in Triesen, aged 86 years old.

== Bibliography ==
- Vogt, Paul (1987). 125 Jahre Landtag (in German). Vaduz: Landtag of the Principality of Liechtenstein.
