= Christian Social Party (Liechtenstein) =

Defunct political party in Liechtenstein

The Christian Social Party of Liechtenstein (German: Christlich-Soziale Partei Liechtensteins, CSP) was a political party in Liechtenstein active from 1962 to 1974.

== History ==
The party was established in 1961, In the 1962 elections, it received 10% of the vote, but failed to win a seat in the Landtag. It appealed to the Constitutional Court, which subsequently ruled that the 18% electoral threshold was unconstitutional. However, the party failed to win a seat in elections in 1966, 1970 and 1974. It has not contested any elections since.

== Electoral results ==
Election	Votes	%	Seats	+/–	Position	Government
1962	342	10.1	0 / 15	–	—	—
1966	323	8.7	0 / 15	–	—	—
1970	65	1.6	0 / 15	–	—	—
1974	922	2.7	0 / 15	–	—	—
