= Walter Brunhart =

Mayor of Balzers from 1960 to 1966

Mayor of Balzers
- In office 1960–1966
- Preceded by: Fidel Brunhart
- Succeeded by: Emanuel Vogt

Personal details
- Born: 1 December 1912 Balzers, Liechtenstein
- Died: 8 May 1991 (aged 78) Balzers, Liechtenstein
- Party: Patriotic Union
- Spouse: Berta Gassner (m. 1938)
- Children: 5

Walter Brunhart (1 December 1912 – 8 May 1991) was a politician from Liechtenstein who served as the mayor of Balzers from 1960 to 1966.

He founded a metalworking shop in Balzers in 1945, which later became known as Bruba AG. During his time as mayor, a new kindergarten was built in 1961 and a new graveyard was opened in 1966.
