= Josef Büchel (politician, born 1922) =

Liechtensteiner and politician (1922–1989)

- 1970 election portrait

Member of the Landtag of Liechtenstein for Oberland
- In office 6 February 1966 – 1 February 1970

Personal details
- Born: 6 December 1922 Balzers, Liechtenstein
- Died: 23 March 1989 (aged 66) Balzers, Liechtenstein
- Party: Progressive Citizens' Party
- Spouse: Hildegard Vogt (m. 1947)
- Children: 2

Josef Büchel (6 December 1922 – 23 March 1989) was a politician from Liechtenstein who served in the Landtag of Liechtenstein from 1966 to 1970.

== Life ==
Büchel was born in Balzers as one of eleven children. He worked as a bricklayer and farmer, and then later he also worked at Oerlikon Balzers until his retirement in 1987.

From 1957 to 1960 he was a member of the Balzers municipal council. He was a member of the Landtag of Liechtenstein from 1966 to 1970 as a member of the Progressive Citizens' Party, and then a deputy member of the Landtag from 1957 to 1966 and again from 1970 to 1974.

He married Hildegard Vogt (6 August 1926 – 17 October 1996) on 22 November 1947 and they had five children together. He died on 23 March 1989 in Balzers, aged 66.

== Bibliography ==
- Vogt, Paul (1987). 125 Jahre Landtag (in German). Vaduz: Landtag of the Principality of Liechtenstein.
