= Donath Oehri =

Liechtenstein politician (born 1959)

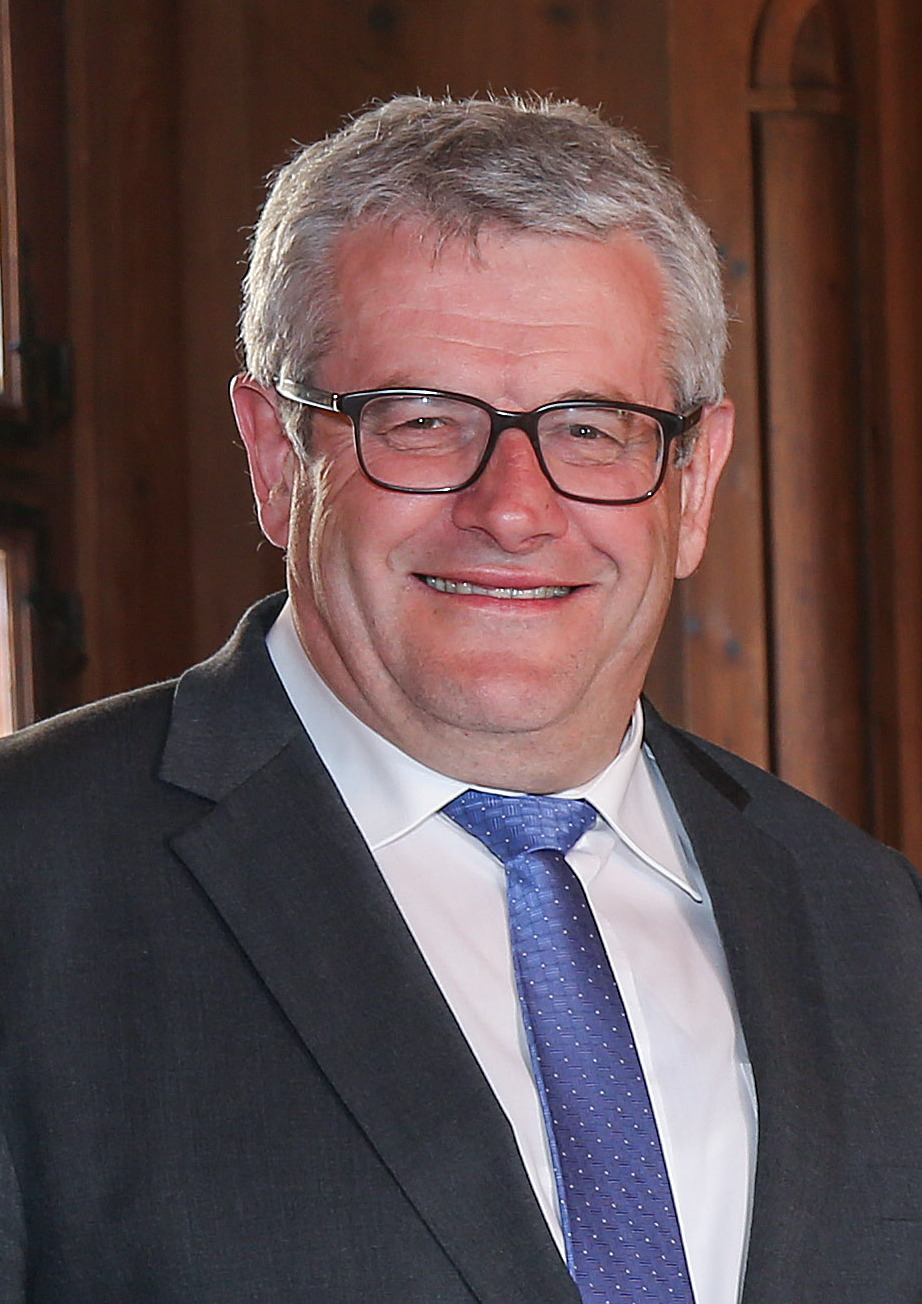
- Oehri in 2017

Member of the Landtag of Liechtenstein for Unterland
- In office 2 February 1997 – 13 March 2005

Mayor of Gamprin
- In office 1995–2019
- Deputy: Thomas Hasler
- Preceded by: Maria Marxer
- Succeeded by: Johannes Hasler

Personal details
- Born: 30 January 1959 (age 67) Eschen, Liechtenstein
- Party: Patriotic Union
- Spouse: Gaby Konrad (m. 1985)
- Children: 2
- Parent(s): Alois Oehri; Berta Hoop

Donath Oehri (born 30 January 1959) is a politician from Liechtenstein who served in the Landtag of Liechtenstein from 1997 to 2005. He also served as the mayor of Gamprin from 1995 to 2019.

He attended teachers' training college in Pfäffikon and Rickenbach and then worked as a primary school teacher in Vaduz from 1980 to 1987 and in Mauren from 1987 to 1995. He was the conductor of the Bendern-Gamprin Church Choir from 1983 to 1989.

Oehri did not seek re-election as mayor in 2019 and was succeeded by Johannes Hasler.

Oehri lives in Gamprin.

== Honours ==
- Liechtenstein: Knight's Cross of the Order of Merit of the Principality of Liechtenstein (2019)
