= Oerlikon Balzers =

Industrial engineering company based in Liechtenstein

Coordinates: 47°4′4.5″N 9°30′0.2″E

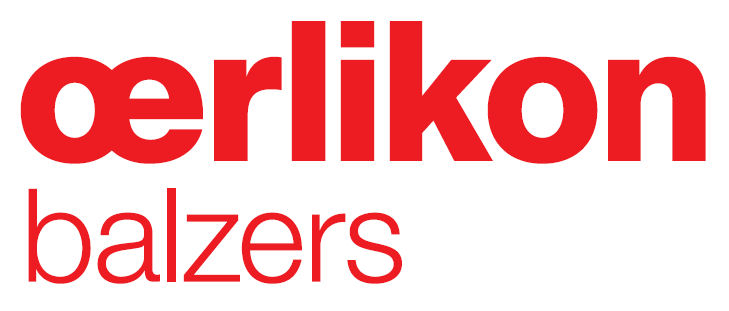
- Company type: Limited (Ltd.)
- Industry: Industrial engineering and manufacturing
- Founded: 1946 as Gerätebauanstalt Balzers
- Founder: Max Auwärter; Prince Franz Josef II; Emil Georg Bührle
- Headquarters: Iramali 18, 9496 Balzers, Liechtenstein
- Products: Surface technologies
- Website: https://www.oerlikon.com/balzers/global/en/

Oerlikon Balzers is part of the OC Oerlikon group, a Swiss technology conglomerate, and a supplier of PVD coatings. The OC Oerlikon group consists of companies in the following divisions: Polymer Processing Solutions and Surface Solutions. The coatings produced by Oerlikon Balzers aim to improve the performance and service life of, for example, metallic precision components by reducing friction and supplying additional hardness.

== History ==
With the support of Prince Franz Josef II and Swiss industrialist Emil Georg Bührle, Professor Max Auwärter founded Gerätebauanstalt Balzers. The objective was to make the then largely unknown and little-researched vacuum thin film technology usable on an industrial scale. Since no systems and equipment for the production of thin-film coatings were available at the time, the company developed and produced them in-house. The first popular applications were sun protection and anti-reflection coatings for ophthalmic lenses, anti-reflection coatings for camera lenses, optical filters and reflectors and thin films for electronic applications.

In 1976, the company became a member of the Oerlikon Group, then Oerlikon-Bührle Holding AG. In 1983, the first coating center was opened outside of Liechtenstein in Italy. One year later, the step to America was taken, and in 1987, the first center in the Asian region took on its operation in Japan.

In June 2014, the OC Oerlikon Group acquired Sulzer Metco from the Swiss Sulzer AG, which has since then been operating under the name Oerlikon Metco. The thin film business of Oerlikon Metco is integrated into Oerlikon Balzers since 2015. Oerlikon Balzers, Oerlikon Metco and Oerlikon AM form the Surface Solutions division of the Oerlikon Group.

Oerlikon Balzers operates over 110 coating centres in more than 35 countries.

The headquarters of Oerlikon Balzers is located in Balzers, Liechtenstein, where over 530 people are employed.

== Products ==
The company offers contract coating services in Europe, the Americas, and Asia; PVD and PACVD-based coating; heat treatment; and coating equipment. Its products and services are used in various applications in various industries They also serve the automotive and transportation, aerospace, medical, food and packaging, energy, consumer goods and engineering sectors worldwide.
