= Ernst Büchel =

Liechtenstein politician (1922–2003)

- Büchel in 1958

Member of the Landtag of Liechtenstein for Unterland
- In office 1 September 1957 – 7 February 1982

Personal details
- Born: 26 February 1922 Gamprin, Liechtenstein
- Died: 4 August 2003 (aged 81) Gamprin, Liechtenstein
- Party: Progressive Citizens' Party
- Parent(s): Wilhelm Büchel; Maria Wohlwend

Ernst Büchel (26 February 1922 – 4 August 2003) was a lawyer and politician from Liechtenstein who served in the Landtag of Liechtenstein from 1957 to 1982.

== Life ==
Büchel was born on 26 February 1922 in Gamprin as the son of mayor of Gamprin Wilhelm Büchel and Maria Wohlwend as one of eight children. He attended secondary school in Freiburg im Breisgau. From 1945 to 1950 he studied law in Freiburg im Breisgau and Innsbruck. From 1950 to 1954 he worked in the Liechtenstein government office and as a lawyer in the Alfred Bühler law firm in Vaduz.

He opened his own law firm in 1954, which he ran until 1988. From 1954 to 1970 he was a member of the board of directors of the National Bank of Liechtenstein, and its chairman from 1966 to 1970.

From 1955 to 1966 and again from 1966 to 1970 he was the president of the Liechtenstein Bachelor of Laws administrative board. From 1957 to 1982 Büchel was a member of the Landtag of Liechtenstein as a member of the Progressive Citizens' Party (FBP). During this time, he was a member of the finance, audit and state committees. He was also a member of the Gamprin municipal council from 1963 to 1966.

On 19 June 1968 Büchel submitted a proposal to the Landtag to introduce women's suffrage in Liechtenstein. However, the subsequent referendum, which included woman voters, were subsequently rejected by voters.

Büchel died in Gamprin on 4 August 2003. He was commemorated by prime minister Otmar Hasler and FBP president Johannes Matt.

== Bibliography ==
- Vogt, Paul (1987). 125 Jahre Landtag (in German). Vaduz: Landtag of the Principality of Liechtenstein.
