= Johann Georg Hasler (politician, born 1895) =

Liechtenstein politician (1895–1976)

Liechtenstein government councillor
- In office 13 August 1941 – 3 September 1945
- Prime Minister: Josef Hoop
- Preceded by: Arnold Hoop
- Succeeded by: Alois Wille

Member of the Landtag of Liechtenstein for Unterland
- In office 1 September 1957 – 23 March 1958
- In office 6 February 1949 – 15 February 1953

Mayor of Eschen
- In office 1951–1963
- Preceded by: Josef Meier
- Succeeded by: Franz Meier

Personal details
- Born: 7 January 1895 Eschen, Liechtenstein
- Died: 16 May 1976 (aged 81) St. Gallen, Switzerland
- Party: Patriotic Union (from 1936); Christian-Social People's Party (before 1936)
- Spouse: Paula Gstöhl (m. 1920; died 1947)
- Children: 6

Johann Georg Hasler (7 January 1895 – 16 May 1976) was a politician from Liechtenstein who served as a government councillor from 1941 to 1945. A member of the Patriotic Union (VU), he later served in the Landtag of Liechtenstein from 1949 to 1953 and again from 1957 to 1958, also serving as vice president of the Landtag from 1957 to 1958. He was also the mayor of Eschen from 1951 to 1963.

== Life ==
Hasler was born 7 January 1895 in Eschen as the son of Franz Josef Hasler and Josepha (née) Ritter as one of nine children. He worked as a carpenter, and later as a farmer. He was an initiator of the Christian-Social People's Party's popular initiative for the introduction of proportional representation. However, it was rejected it was rejected in the subsequent referendum in 1930.

In the 1939 elections, Hasler was elected as a deputy member of the Landtag of Liechtenstein as member of the Patriotic Union (VU) as part of the unified list between the part and the Progressive Citizens' Party for the formation of a coalition government, where he served until 1945. He was a deputy government councillor from 1939, and then he succeeded Arnold Hoop as a government councillor in August 1941, where he served under the government of Josef Hoop until 1945.

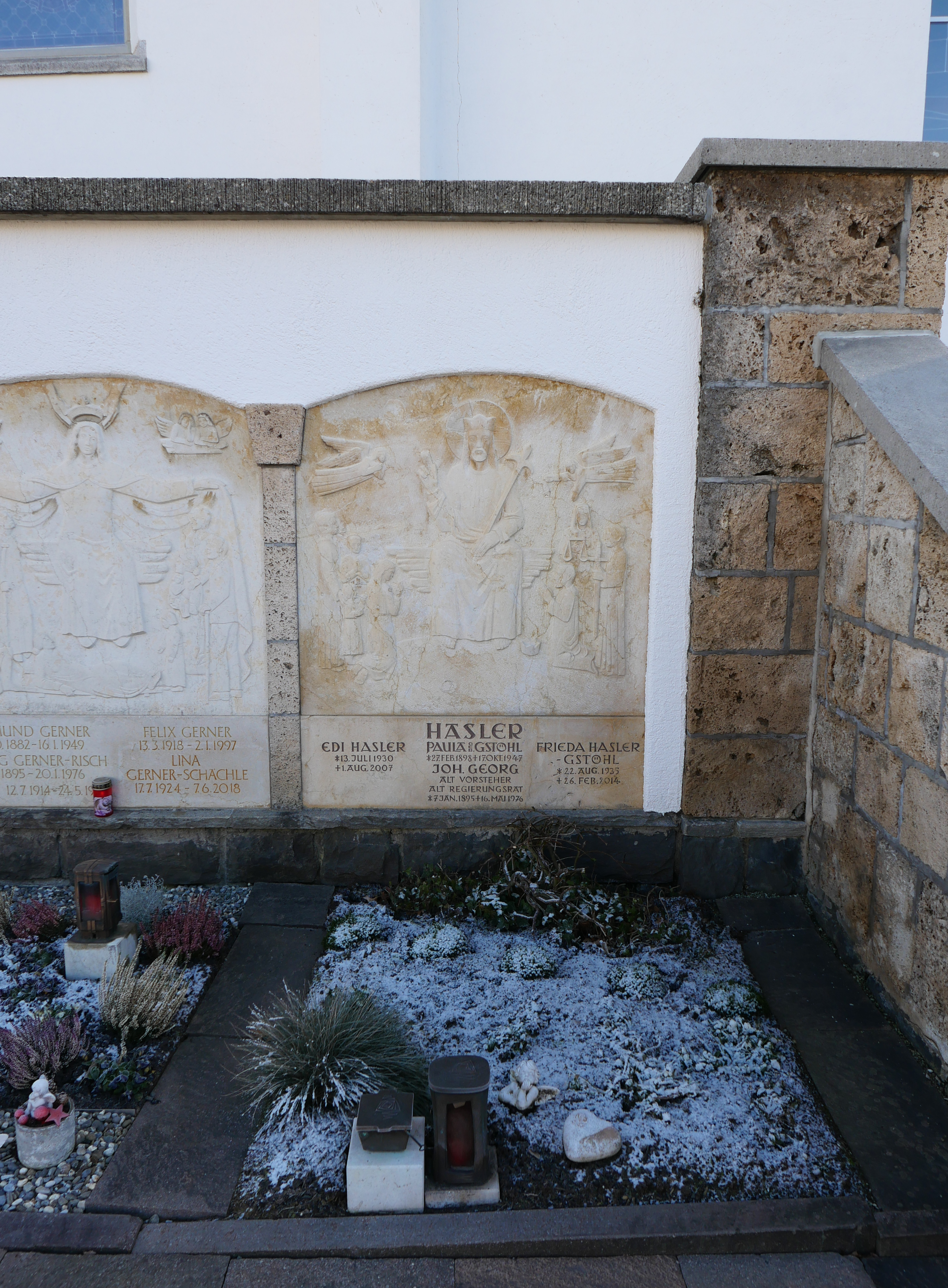
The family grave in 2025.

Hasler was elected as a full member of the Landtag in the 1949 elections as a member of the VU. Again a deputy member from February 1953 to 1957, he served as a full member for a second time from 1957 to 1958, and finally as a deputy from 1958 to 1962. He was the vice president of the Landtag from 1957 to 1958.

From 1945 to 1948 he was a member of the Eschen municipal council, and then mayor of the municipality from 1951 to 1963. During his time as mayor, he oversaw the renovation of the Eschen community centre and the starting of the construction of a school in Nendeln.

== Personal life ==
Hasler married Paula Gstöhl (27 February 1898 – 17 October 1947) on 15 April 1920 and they had six children together. Hasler died on 16 May 1976 in St. Gallen, aged 81; he is buried in Eschen.

== Bibliography ==
- Nohlen, Dieter; Stöver, Philip (2010). Elections in Europe: A data handbook. Nomos. ISBN 978-3-8329-5609-7.
- Vogt, Paul (1987). 125 Jahre Landtag (in German). Vaduz: Landtag of the Principality of Liechtenstein.
