= Roman Gassner =

Liechtenstein politician (1929–2008)

Member of the Landtag of Liechtenstein for Oberland
- In office 23 March 1958 – 3 February 1974

Personal details
- Born: 18 November 1929 Schaan, Liechtenstein
- Died: 15 February 2008 (aged 78) Zurich, Switzerland
- Party: Patriotic Union
- Spouse: Ursula Spörry (m. 1956)
- Children: 2

Roman Gassner (18 November 1929 – 15 February 2008) was a politician from Liechtenstein who served in the Landtag of Liechtenstein from 1958 to 1974.

== Life ==
Gassner was born on 18 November 1929 in Schaan as the son of Alphons Gassner and Sophie Mähr as one of two children. He attended secondary school in Vaduz and conducted an apprenticeship as a bricklayer. He attended federal trade school in Innsbruck and then worked as a master bricklayer. From 1955 to 1995 he managed his own construction company in Vaduz.

From 1957 to 1958 Gassner was a deputy member of the Landtag of Liechtenstein as a member of the Patriotic Union, and then a full member from 1958 to 1974. He was the Patriotic Union's spokesman in the Landtag from 1966 to 1974. He was the first Landtag member to actively support the introduction of women's suffrage in Liechtenstein, starting from 1965. Additionally, he was also a member of the Vaduz municipal council from 1969 to 1972 and again from 1975 to 1983.

In the run-up to the 2003 Liechtenstein constitutional referendum, Gassner alongside other former members of the Landtag, opposed the proposed changes by the prince.

Gassner married Ursula Spörry on 18 October 1956 and they had two children together. He lived in Vaduz.

== Bibliography ==
- Vogt, Paul (1987). 125 Jahre Landtag (in German). Vaduz: Landtag of the Principality of Liechtenstein.
