= Bendern =

- Village
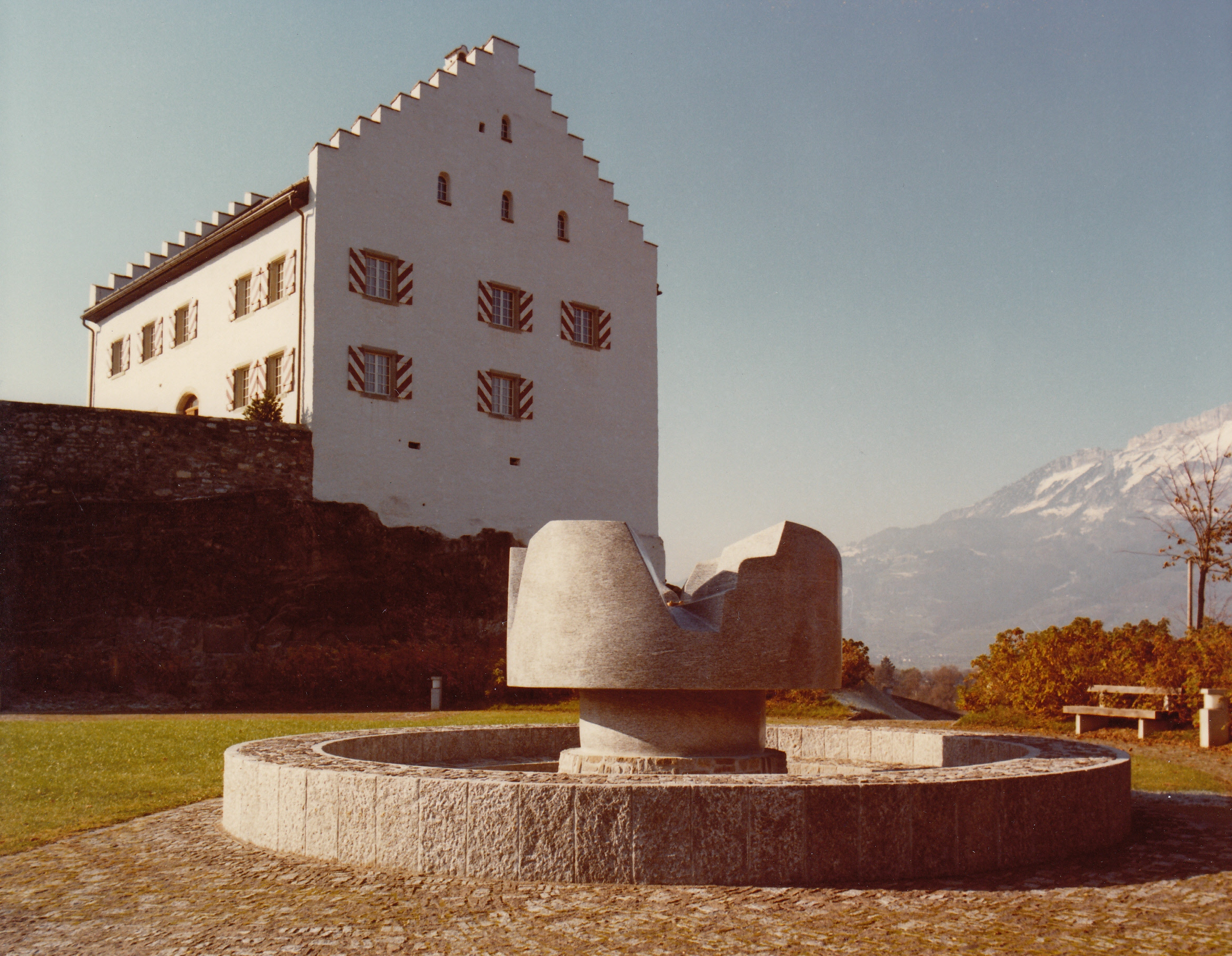
- Bendern fountain in 1978–1980

- Locator map of Bendern in Liechtenstein
- Coordinates: 47°13′N 9°30′E
- Country: Liechtenstein
- Electoral district: Unterland
- Municipality: Gamprin
- Elevation: 460 m (1,510 ft)

Population
  - Total: 1,664 (2,015)
- Time zone: UTC+1 (CET)
  - Summer (DST): UTC+2 (CEST)
- Postal code: 9487
- Area code: (+423) ...

Bendern (German pronunciation: [ˈbɛndɐn]) is a village of Liechtenstein, together with the town of Gamprin it forms in the municipality of Gamprin. It is the third smallest in the country, with an area of 6.19 km^{2} and a total population of 1664 people (as of 2015). The village itself had about 470 residents (as of 2007).

== History ==
The name is of Celtic origin. The place was first mentioned in 1045 as Beneduro. During the Swabian War, the village was burned down by the Swiss. 1538–1636 Bendern hosted the Premonstratensians of St Luzi Abby in Chur, that fled the Reformation. The church hill of Bendern is an important place for the history of the country. On 16 March 1699, the men from Liechtenstein's lowlands pledged allegiance to the Prince of Liechtenstein on the church hill, after Lordship of Schellenberg was bought by the Prince of Liechtenstein. The Bendern fountain was created to commemorate this.

Over the years, important excavations have taken place. The history of the church can be traced back to Carolingian-Ottonian and Roman times. Older traces of settlement in the form of ceramics go back to prehistoric times.

The baroque velum quadragesimale from the local church house Mariä Himmelfahrt, known as the Benderner Fastentuch in German is nowaday one of the treasures in the National Museum in Vaduz, the church possesses a copy.

== Geography ==
The village is located by the river Rhine and the Eschnerberg, close to Gamprin, and next to the borders of Switzerland. It is linked with the Swiss village of Haag, a hamlet of Sennwald, with a road bridge originally built in 1868.

== Economy ==
There are about 100 businesses providing roughly 2500 jobs in the municipality. In addition, the village is home to the Liechtenstein-Institut (LI), which focuses on research into the country. Until 2017 it was the seat of the International Academy for Philosophy (IAP).
