= Franz Josef Schurte =

Liechtenstein politician (1907–1989)

Member of the Landtag of Liechtenstein for Oberland
- In office 25 March 1962 – 6 February 1966

Personal details
- Born: 5 January 1907 Triesen, Liechtenstein
- Died: 6 January 1989 (aged 82) Triesen, Liechtenstein
- Party: Progressive Citizens' Party
- Spouse: Luzia Marxer (m. 1935–1985)
- Children: 1

Franz Josef Schurte (5 January 1907 – 6 January 1989) was a politician from Liechtenstein who served in the Landtag of Liechtenstein from 1962 to 1966.

He worked as a farmer and blacksmith in Triesen and was a member of the supervisory board of the National Bank of Liechtenstein from 1955 to 1967. He was a deputy member of the Landtag from 1957 to 1962 as a member of the Progressive Citizens' Party.

== Bibliography ==
- Vogt, Paul (1987). 125 Jahre Landtag (in German). Vaduz: Landtag of the Principality of Liechtenstein.
