= Franz Meier =

Liechtenstein politician (1924–2015)

Member of the Landtag of Liechtenstein for Unterland
- In office 3 February 1978 – 2 February 1986

Mayor of Eschen
- In office 1963–1969
- Preceded by: Johann Georg Hasler
- Succeeded by: Alban Meier

Personal details
- Born: 7 June 1924 Eschen, Liechtenstein
- Died: 15 February 2015 (aged 90) Eschen, Liechtenstein
- Party: Patriotic Union
- Spouse: Margreth Feuchtinger (m. 1958)
- Children: 3

Franz Meier (7 June 1924 – 15 February 2015) was a politician from Liechtenstein who served in the Landtag of Liechtenstein from 1978 to 1986. He was previously the mayor of Eschen from 1963 to 1969.

He worked as a bricklayer and foreman. He was a member of the administrative board of the old-age and survivors insurance in Liechtenstein.

== Bibliography ==
- Vogt, Paul (1987). 125 Jahre Landtag (in German). Vaduz: Landtag of the Principality of Liechtenstein.
