= Samuel Kindle =

Liechtenstein politician (1924–2009)

Member of the Landtag of Liechtenstein for Oberland
- In office 6 February 1966 – 1 February 1970

Personal details
- Born: 2 December 1924 Triesen, Liechtenstein
- Died: 2 November 2009 (aged 84) Vaduz, Liechtenstein
- Party: Patriotic Union
- Spouse: Melanie Negele (m. 1951)
- Relations: Paul Kindle (brother); Herbert Kindle (brother)
- Children: 3

Samuel Kindle (2 December 1924 – 2 November 2009) was a politician from Liechtenstein who served in the Landtag of Liechtenstein from 1966 to 1970.

Kindle was a deputy member of the Landtag from 1962 to 1966 as a member of the Patriotic Union. He was a member of the Triesen municipal council from 1957 to 1960, again from 1963 to 1969 and finally from 1975 to 1979.

He married Melanie Negele (27 August 1918 – 25 April 2011) on 5 April 1951 and they had three children together. His brothers Paul and Herbert also served in the Landtag.

== Bibliography ==
- Vogt, Paul (1987). 125 Jahre Landtag (in German). Vaduz: Landtag of the Principality of Liechtenstein.
