= Fidel Brunhart =

Liechtenstein politician (1900–1970)

- Obituary portrait

Member of the Landtag of Liechtenstein for Oberland
- In office 23 March 1958 – 25 March 1962
- In office 29 April 1945 – 1 September 1957

Mayor of Balzers
- In office 1945–1960
- Preceded by: Alois Willie
- Succeeded by: Walter Brunhart

Personal details
- Born: 26 January 1900 Balzers, Liechtenstein
- Died: 28 June 1970 (aged 70) Walenstadt, Switzerland
- Party: Progressive Citizens' Party

Fidel Brunhart (26 January 1900 – 28 June 1970) was a politician from Liechtenstein who served in the Landtag of Liechtenstein from 1945 to 1957 and again from 1958 to 1962. He was also mayor of Balzers from 1945 to 1960.

== Life ==
Brunhart was born on 26 January 1900 in Balzers as the son of Simon Brunhart and Josefa Büchel as one of four children. He worked as a seasonal construction worker in Zurich and Azmoos. He was initially a supporter of the Christian-Social People's Party, but switched to the Progressive Citizens' Party in 1936 as he disapproved of the CSPV merging with the Liechtenstein Homeland Service.

He was a member of the Balzers municipal council from 1936 to 1942 as a member of the Progressive Citizens' Party. He was mayor of Balzers from 1945 to 1960. During this time, he was involved in the founding of Oerlikon Balzers in 1946, and the building of a new school in 1951.

From 1945 to 1957, and again from 1958 to 1962 he was a member of the Landtag of Liechtenstein. During this time, he was a member of the state, audit and finance committee. He was a deputy member of the Landtag from 1957 to 1958 and again from 1962 to 1966. He was a member of the board of directors at the National Bank of Liechtenstein from 1962 to 1970.

He died on 28 June 1970, aged 70.

== Bibliography ==
- Vogt, Paul (1987). 125 Jahre Landtag (in German). Vaduz: Landtag of the Principality of Liechtenstein.
