= Ludwig Beck (politician) =

Liechtenstein politician (1909–1980)

Member of the Landtag of Liechtenstein for Oberland
- In office 1 September 1957 – 23 March 1958

Mayor of Schaan
- In office 1957–1969
- Preceded by: Tobias Jehle
- Succeeded by: Walter Beck

Personal details
- Born: 19 February 1909 Schaan, Liechtenstein
- Died: 25 December 1980 (aged 71) Schaan, Liechtenstein
- Party: Patriotic Union
- Spouse: Maria Kindle (m. 1936)
- Children: 2

Ludwig Beck (German: [ˈluːt.vɪç bɛk]; 19 February 1909 – 25 December 1980) was a banker and politician from Liechtenstein who served in the Landtag of Liechtenstein from 1957 to 1958. A member of the Patriotic Union (VU), he also served as the mayor of Schaan from 1957 to 1969.

== Life ==
Beck was born on 19 February 1909 in Schaan as the son of Franz Michael Beck and Apollonia (née Nigsch) as one of four children; he worked as a carpenter in Schaan. In 1938, he was elected to the Schaan section of the Liechtenstein Health Insurance Fund (LKK). He was the part-time president of the National Bank of Liechtenstein from 1942 to 1959, then its full time administrator from 1960 to 1980. He was vice president of the Buchs Waste Disposal Association.

He was the mayor of Schaan from 1957 to 1969 as a member of the Patriotic Union (VU). During this time, an outdoor swimming pool was built, the St. Peter Chapel was renovated and the Rebera school building was constructed. He was also a member of the Landtag of Liechtenstein from 1957 to 1958.

Beck married Maria Kindle (30 June 1915 – 2 January 2005) on 30 June 1936 and they had two children together. He died of a long illness on 25 December 1980, aged 71.

== Bibliography ==
- Vogt, Paul (1987). 125 Jahre Landtag (in German). Vaduz: Landtag of the Principality of Liechtenstein.
