= Tobias Jehle =

Liechtenstein politician (1885–1978)

Member of the Landtag of Liechtenstein for Oberland
- In office 6 February 1949 – 15 February 1953

Mayor of Schaan
- In office 1942–1957
- Preceded by: Josef Schierscher
- Succeeded by: Ludwig Beck

Personal details
- Born: 20 May 1885 Schaan, Liechtenstein
- Died: 12 April 1978 (aged 92) St. Gallen, Switzerland
- Party: Progressive Citizens' Party

Tobias Jehle (20 May 1885 – 12 April 1978) was a politician from Liechtenstein who served in the Landtag of Liechtenstein from 1949 to 1953. He also served as the mayor of Schaan from 1942 to 1957.

== Life ==
Jehle was born on 20 May 1885 in Schaan as the son of Urban and Walburga (née Hemmerle) as one of six children. He worked as a dairy farmer, bricklayer and plasterer. He jointly ran a construction company in Schaan from 1925 to 1966. He was a singer at the Schaan church choir from 1904 to 1969.

He was a member of the Schaan municipal council from 1930 to 1942, and then mayor of the municipality from 1942 to 1957 as a member of the Progressive Citizens' Party (FBP). He was a subsituite judge at the Liechtenstein state court from 1936 to 1942. During his time as mayor, the reed drainage system was completed, the Schaan community centre was built, and the schoolhouse was expanded. He was a member of the Landtag of Liechtenstein from 1949 to 1953. During his time in the Landtag, he was a member of the finance, audit and state committees.

Jehle died on 12 April 1978 in the hospital of St. Gallen, shortly after breaking his arm, aged 92.

== Bibliography ==
- Vogt, Paul (1987). 125 Jahre Landtag (in German). Vaduz: Landtag of the Principality of Liechtenstein.
