= Leo Gerner =

Liechtenstein politician (1912–1981)

Member of the Landtag of Liechtenstein for Unterland
- In office 1 September 1957 – 1 February 1970

Personal details
- Born: 28 June 1912 Eschen, Liechtenstein
- Died: 27 January 1981 (aged 68) Eschen, Liechtenstein
- Party: Progressive Citizens' Party
- Spouse: Luzia Marxer (m. 1940)
- Children: 3, including Anton Gerner

Leo Gerner (28 June 1912 – 7 January 1981) was a politician from Liechtenstein who served in the Landtag of Liechtenstein from 1957 to 1970.

He worked as a farmer and miller in Eschen and was the administrator of the Eschen community centre from 1952 to 1976. He was a member of the Eschen municipal council from 1951 to 1960 as a member of the Progressive Citizens' Party.

Gerner married Luzia Marxer (6 October 1913 – 11 November 1994) on 21 May 1940 and they had three children together. His son Anton Gerner also served in the Landtag and also as a government councillor.

== Bibliography ==
- Vogt, Paul (1987). 125 Jahre Landtag (in German). Vaduz: Landtag of the Principality of Liechtenstein.
