= Johann Beck (politician, born 1913) =

Liechtenstein journalist and politician (1913–1997)

- Beck in 1980

Member of the Landtag of Liechtenstein for Oberland
- In office 14 June 1953 – 3 February 1978

Personal details
- Born: 3 December 1913 Vaduz, Liechtenstein
- Died: 16 November 1997 (aged 83) Triesenberg, Liechtenstein
- Party: Patriotic Union
- Spouse: Irma Eberle (m. 1940)
- Children: 1

Johann Beck (3 December 1913 – 16 November 1997) was a journalist and politician from Liechtenstein who served in the Landtag of Liechtenstein from 1953 to 1978.

== Life ==
Beck was born on 3 December 1913 in Vaduz as the son of blacksmith Josef and Maria (née Beck) as one of four children. Initially trained in masonry, he worked as a construction worker and later as a foreman.

From 1956 to 1979 he was the president of the Liechtenstein Employees' Association. From June 1953 to 1978 he was a member of the Landtag of Liechtenstein as a member of the Patriotic Union (VU). During this time, he was a member of the finance and audit committee. From 1964 to 1974 he was a member of the board of directors of the old-age and survivors insurance in Liechtenstein, and was its vice president from 1970 to 1974. From 1974, he was an honorary member of the Patriotic Union.

Beck also worked as a historian and journalist for newspapers where he wrote historical articles, poems, and travel reports. He was an honorary member of the VU and the church choir in Triesenberg. In 1979, he was awarded the title of Princely Social Councillor by Franz Joseph II.

He married Irma Eberle on 22 August 1940 and they had one child together. He died of a short illness on 16 November 1997, aged 83.

== Honours ==
- Liechtenstein: Commander's Cross of the Order of Merit of the Principality of Liechtenstein (1976)

== Bibliography ==
- Vogt, Paul (1987). 125 Jahre Landtag (in German). Vaduz: Landtag of the Principality of Liechtenstein.
