= Courts of Liechtenstein =

Judiciary of Liechtenstein

The court system in Liechtenstein was established in the Constitution of 1921, and still persists. There are three parts: the ordinary courts, the Administrative Court, and the Constitutional Court.

== Ordinary Courts ==
In the courts of Liechtenstein, the order of precedence, in ascending order is as follows:

1. Princely Court of Justice (German: Fürstliches Landgericht, lit. 'Princely Land Court').
2. Princely Court of Appeals (German: Fürstliches Obergericht, lit. 'Princely Higher Court')
3. Princely Supreme Court (German: Oberster Gerichtshof)

== Public law ==
1. Administrative court
2. State court

== Appointment of judges ==
For the selection of judges, the Prince Regnant and the Diet refer to a joint commission (Judges’ Selection Board) composed of 1 member from each parliamentary group, the Minister of Justice and Infrastructure, and representatives sent by the Prince equal in number to those sent by the Parliament. The Judges’ Selection Board is chaired by the Prince, who has a casting vote. The Board’s deliberations are confidential.

The final decision of candidates rests with the Diet which can reject the Board’s proposal. Should the Diet and the Judges’ Selection Board not agree on a candidate within 4 weeks of the first one being rejected, the Diet proposes its own candidate subject to confirmation in a referendum whereto citizens may propose further candidates under the conditions of Art. 64 of the Constitution. For elections where there are more than 2 candidates, a second vote must be held pursuant to Art. 113 para. 2 of the Constitution. The candidate who receives approval from the Diet or an absolute majority of votes cast in a referendum shall be appointed as judge by the Prince.

== Supreme Court ==
The Princely Supreme Court is the highest court of appeal in Liechtenstein. Under the Constitution of Liechtenstein, all courts were brought under Liechtenstein control – previously, the court of Appeal was based in Vienna, Austria.

The Supreme Court is the third instance and final court for most disputes. It exercises power over both civil and criminal matters. In 2020 it handled over 128 cases.

The court decides on most matters in 2 Senates consisting of a Chairperson 4 Supreme Judges. The Senates, when not deciding, consist of their Chairperson their deputy, 4 Supreme Judges and their substitutes.

== State Court ==
The State Court was established in 1921. The court consists of a president and 4 judges.

Under article 105 of the Liechtensteinian ^{[Wiktionary]} Constitution, the Prince appoints half of the Judges and Parliament appoints the other half.

The court rules on Constitutional rights, European Court of Human Rights issues and EEA rights. Both corporations and humans are able to appeal to the court. The court is also able to assess parliamentary legislation and nullify unconstitutional laws. Citizens are able to petition the court to review a law as long as 100 citizens support the motion. The State Court also decides upon conflicts of jurisdiction between administrative and judicial authorities, as well as upon impeachment proceedings against ministers, and on electoral disputes.
