= Alois Oehri =

Liechtenstein politician (1918–1997)

Member of the Landtag of Liechtenstein for Unterland
- In office 1 September 1957 – 6 February 1966

Mayor of Gamprin
- In office 1963–1976
- Preceded by: Johann Georg Hasler
- Succeeded by: Lorenz Hasler

Personal details
- Born: 7 August 1918 Gamprin, Liechtenstein
- Died: 29 July 1997 (aged 78) Gamprin, Liechtenstein
- Party: Patriotic Union
- Spouse: Berta Hoop (m. 1947; died 1981)
- Children: 4, including Donath

Alois Oehri (7 August 1918 – 29 July 1997) was a farmer and politician from Liechtenstein who served in the Landtag of Liechtenstein from 1957 to 1966. He also served as the Mayor of Gamprin from 1963 to 1975.

He worked as a farmer. During his time as mayor, the community centre was completed in 1966, the municipality's first kindergarten was opened in 1968, and the Parish church was renovated from 1969 to 1970. He was an honorary member of the Patriotic Union.

He died on an unspecified disease on 29 July 1997 in Gamprin, aged 78. His son Donath Oehri also served in the Landtag and as mayor of Gamprin.

== Bibliography ==
- Vogt, Paul (1987). 125 Jahre Landtag (in German). Vaduz: Landtag of the Principality of Liechtenstein.
