= Hans Gassner (politician, born 1898) =

Liechtenstein politician (1898–1973)

Member of the Landtag of Liechtenstein for Oberland
- In office 29 October 1959 – 6 February 1966
- Preceded by: Josef Hoop
- In office 1 September 1957 – 23 March 1958

Mayor of Triesenberg
- In office 1951–1966
- Preceded by: Johann Beck
- Succeeded by: Alfons Schädler

Personal details
- Born: 2 October 1898 Triesenberg, Liechtenstein
- Died: 31 March 1973 (aged 74) Triesenberg, Liechtenstein
- Party: Progressive Citizens' Party
- Spouse: Frieda Nägele (m. 1927)
- Children: 3, including Hans

Hans Gassner (2 October 1898 – 31 March 1973) was a politician from Liechtenstein who served in the Landtag of Liechtenstein from 1957 to 1958 and again from 1959 to 1966. A member of the Progressive Citizens' Party (FBP), he also served as the mayor of Triesenberg from 1951 to 1966.

== Life ==
Gassner was born on 2 October 1898 in Triesenberg as the son of municipal councillor Gottlieb Gassner and Philomena (née Bühler) as one of twelve children. He attended secondary school in Bregenz and Feldkirch, Vorarlberg. From 1928 to 1946 he was a government chancellor and also the secretary of the Landtag of Liechtenstein from 1930 to 1945. He was the head of the Liechtenstein land registry from 1946 to 1963.

Gassner was the secretary of the Liechtenstein Loyalty Association, which was formed in 1939. He was the primary of the organizer of the organization's signature campaign to reaffirm Liechtenstein's independence and loyalty to the prince following the 1939 Liechtenstein putsch. The campaign received 2492 signatures, representing 95% of the country's eligible voters. He was the mayor of Triesenberg from 1951 to 1966 as a member of the Progressive Citizens' Party. During his term in office, it saw the completion of a new school building in 1954, the establishments of a museum in 1961, and the opening of the municipality's first kindergarten in 1963.

He was a member of the Landtag from 1957 to 1958. Elected as a deputy member in the 1958 elections, he succeeded Josef Hoop as a full member on 29 October 1959 following his death, where he served until 1966. He was again a deputy member from 1966 to 1970.

He was a co-founder of the Triesenberg tourist association in 1934 and its president from 1954 to 1959. He authored local poems.

Gassner married Frieda Nägele (9 February 1907 – 1 February 1975) on 7 February 1927 and they had three children together. He died on 31 March 1973, aged 72. His son Hans served as a government councillor from 1974 to 1978.

== Bibliography ==
- Vogt, Paul (1987). 125 Jahre Landtag (in German). Vaduz: Landtag of the Principality of Liechtenstein.
