= Georg Oehri =

Liechtenstein politician (1905–1987)

Member of the Landtag of Liechtenstein for Unterland
- In office 1 September 1957 – 1 February 1970

Mayor of Schellenberg
- In office 1954–1960
- Preceded by: Urban Rederer
- Succeeded by: Hugo Oehri

Personal details
- Born: 4 January 1905 Schellenberg, Liechtenstein
- Died: 20 October 1987 (aged 82) Schellenberg, Liechtenstein
- Party: Progressive Citizens' Party
- Spouse: Katharina Büchel (m. 1933; died 1982)
- Children: 7

Georg Oehri (4 January 1905 – 20 October 1987) was a politician from Liechtenstein who served in the Landtag of Liechtenstein from 1957 to 1970. He was also the mayor of Schellenberg from 1954 to 1960.

He worked as a bricklayer and farmer. He was a member of the Schellenberg municipal council from 1945 to 1954 and was deputy mayor from 1951 to 1954. During his time as mayor he oversaw the planning of a new parish church in the municipality.

== Bibliography ==
- Vogt, Paul (1987). 125 Jahre Landtag (in German). Vaduz: Landtag of the Principality of Liechtenstein.
