= Gustav Jehle =

Mayor of Planken from 1936 to 1969

Mayor of Planken
- In office 1936–1969
- Preceded by: Ferdinand Beck
- Succeeded by: Anton Nägele

Personal details
- Born: 17 July 1908 Planken, Liechtenstein
- Died: 24 February 1991 (aged 82) Planken, Liechtenstein
- Party: Progressive Citizens' Party
- Spouse: Maria Nägele (m. 1938; died 1984)
- Children: 5

Gustav Jehle (17 July 1908 – 24 February 1991) was a politician from Liechtenstein who served as the mayor of Planken from 1936 to 1969.

== Life ==
He attended construction foreman school in St. Gallen and from 1950 to 1980 he ran a construction company in Planken. He also owned a farm. During his time as mayor of Planken, he oversaw a housing boom within the municipality.

In 1939 Jehle was elected as a deputy member of the Landtag of Liechtenstein as member of the Progressive Citizens' Party as part of the unified list between the part and the Patriotic Union for the formation of a coalition government, where he served until 1945. He again served as a deputy member from 1966 to 1974.

Jehle married Maria Nägele (23 March 1916 – 11 October 1984) on 28 April 1938 and they had five children together.

== Bibliography ==
- Vogt, Paul (1987). 125 Jahre Landtag (in German). Vaduz: Landtag of the Principality of Liechtenstein.
