= Gamprin =

- Municipality
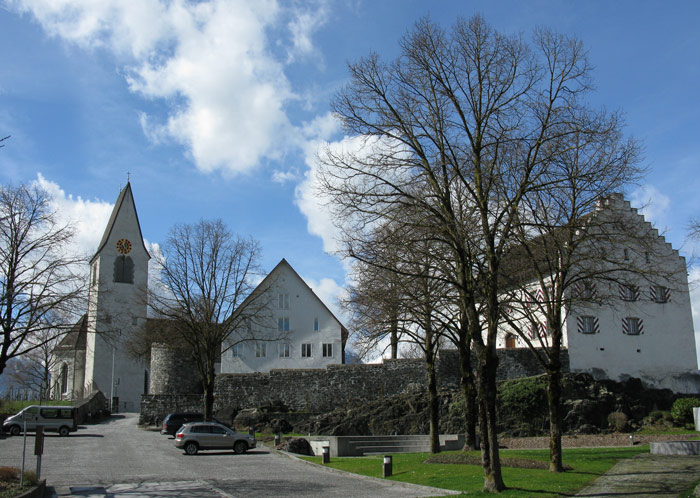
- Bendern, with the parish church of Saint Maria

- Flag Coat of arms
- Interactive map of Gamprin
- Coordinates: 47°13′N 9°30′E
- Country: Liechtenstein
- Electoral district: Unterland
- Villages: Bendern

Government
  - Mayor: Johannes Hasler (FBP)

Area
  - Total: 6.1 km^{2} (2.4 sq mi)
- Elevation: 472 m (1,549 ft)

Population (31-12-2019)
  - Total: 1,690
  - Density: 273/km^{2} (710/sq mi)
- Time zone: UTC+1 (CET)
  - Summer (DST): CEST
- Postal code: 9487
- Area code: 7009
- ISO 3166 code: LI-03
- Website: www.gamprin.li

Gamprin (Swiss Standard German pronunciation: [ɡamˈpriːn]) is a municipality of Liechtenstein, on the Rhine on the border with the municipality of Sennwald, in Switzerland. It had 1,690 inhabitants in 2019. The municipality contains the village of Bendern and scattered hamlets and the Liechtenstein Institute and LGT Group.

== History ==
Evidence of human settlement from the Stone, Bronze and Iron Ages have been found in Gamprin. Within the territory of the parish there is the archaeological site of Lutzengüetle (Lotzagüetle).

The name's toponymy is derived from Old Romansh camp Rin ("field on the Rhine"). It was first mentioned in about 1150 as Camporin, and in 1253 it was mentioned as Gamperin.

The Bendern Parish Church, dedicated to Mother Mary, has a nave dating back to the 8th or 9th century, which was enlarged in the 14th century. The church's Gothic chancel was inaugurated in 1481, while a tower was built around the same time. In 1499, during the Swabian War, the village was pillaged by the Swiss Confederates. The oldest preserved village charter from 1643 describes the rights and duties of the villagers to use pastures and forests. Unterland men swore allegiance to the Prince in 1699 at Bendern.

In the 18th and 19th centuries, Bendern ran one of the five ferries in the Liechtenstein section of the Rhine and connected it with Haag on the opposite side of the river, now in the Swiss municipality of Sennwald. A wooden bridge was built across the river in 1867–68.

== Politics ==
Gamprin is locally administered by the mayor and a 8-person municipal council, elected every four years since 1975. The incumbent mayor is Johannes Hasler, since 2019.

=== List of mayors (1864–present) ===
List of mayors (1864–present)
Name	Term	Party	Ref(s).
Johann Georg Näscher	1864–1867	—	
Johann Georg Hasler	1867–1868	—	
Adam Hasler	1868–1870	—	
Franz Josef Hoop	1870–1873	—	
Johann Georg Näscher	1873–1879	—	
Sebastian Näscher	1879–1885	—	
Lorenz Kind	1885–1891	—	
Johann Georg Näscher	1891–1894	—	
Lorenz Kind	1894–1900	—	
Adolf Matt	1900–1909	—	
Johann Hasler	1909–1915	—	
Felix Gubelmann	1915–1922	FBP	
Wilhelm Büchel	1921–1930	FBP	
Wilhelm Näscher	1930–1936	FBP	
Josef Marxer	1936–1945	VU	
Martin Näscher	1945–1954	FBP	
Johann Georg Hasler	1954–1963	FBP	
Alois Oehri	1963–1975	VU	
Lorenz Hasler	1975–1991	FBP	
Maria Marxer	1991–1995	FBP	
Donath Oehri	1995–2019	VU	
Johannes Hasler	2019–	FBP	

=== Last election ===
Party	Votes	%	Seats	+/–
Progressive Citizens' Party	2,676	55.47	4	0
Patriotic Union	2,148	44.53	4	0
Total	4,824	100.00	8	0
Valid votes	603	94.96		
Invalid votes	16	2.52		
Blank votes	16	2.52		
Total votes	635	100.00		
Registered voters/turnout	913	69.55		
Source: Gemeindewahlen

== Geography ==
Gamprin, with an area of 6.188 km^{2}, lies in the hilly landscape west of Eschnerberg and consists of the villages Gamprin and Bendern. It is a scattered settlement, and contains the old hamlets of Au, Bühl, Badäl, Salums and Gölla. To the south, Gamprin borders on the Rheinau-Tentscha exclave of the municipality of Eschen as well as on Vaduz and Schaan, to the east lies the municipality of Eschen, and to the north Schellenberg and Ruggell. In the west, the Rhine forms the border with the municipality of Sennwald in Switzerland.

Bendern and the bridge over the Rhine in 1927

Gamprin has an exclave with the so-called Nendler Berg western slope of the Dreischwestern Massif. There is 72.38 ha of communal forest above Nendeln and Schaanwald. Another communal forest of 40.52 ha is located on the Eschnerberg.

The municipality contains the 2.6 ha (6.4 acres) Gampriner Seele, the only lake in Liechtenstein. It was created by a flood of the Rhine with enormous erosion in 1927.

== Coat of arms ==
Until 1950 the municipality of Gamprin didn't have a coat of arms nor an official flag. The council of Gamprin established a committee to design a flag and a coat of arms for the municipality. The yellow ribbon symbolises the Rhine and the roses were from the coat of arms of the knight Rüdiger von Limpach, who owned property in Gamprin in the Middle Ages. In 1958 the new flag and coat of arms were adopted by the municipality of Gamprin.

== Landmarks ==
The municipality contains the Liechtenstein Institute and LGT Group. There is a winery in the municipality named Zaungässler Weine.

== Notable people ==
- Wilhelm Büchel (1873–1951), farmer and politician (FBP), member of the Parliament of the Principality of Liechtenstein
- Wilhelm Näscher (1892–1948), farmer and politician (FBP), member of the Parliament of the Principality of Liechtenstein
- Johann Georg Hasler (1898–1976), farmer and politician (FBP), member of the Parliament of the Principality of Liechtenstein
- Ernst Büchel (1922–2003), lawyer and politician (FBP), member of the Parliament of the Principality of Liechtenstein
- Armin Meier (1941–1999), remedial teacher and politician (FBP), member of the Parliament of the Principality of Liechtenstein
- Otmar Hasler (born 1953), teacher and politician (FBP), head of the government of the Principality of Liechtenstein
- Tina Weirather (born 1989), alpine skier.
- Matthias Kaiser (born 1991), motor racing driver.

Connected to the municipality

- Georg Gstöhl (1925–1999), teacher and politician (VU), member of the Liechtenstein Parliament, was a teacher, organist and conductor in Gamprin
- Elfried Hasler (born 1965), financial analyst, asset manager and politician (FBP), member of the Liechtenstein Parliament, grew up in Gamprin
- Marina Nigg (born 1984), ski racer, started for the SV Gamprin
