= 1928 Liechtenstein general election =

- 15 July 1928 (first round); 29 July 1928 (second round)
- All 15 seats in the Landtag; 8 seats needed for a majority
- Turnout: 93.09% (▼0.38pp)
Party	Leader	Vote %	Seats	+/–
FBP	Josef Hoop	54.75	11	+5
VP	Wilhelm Beck	45.25	4	−5
This lists parties that won seats. See the complete results below.
Results by constituency
Prime Minister before	Prime Minister after
Gustav Schädler; VP	Josef Hoop; FBP

General elections were held in Liechtenstein on 15 and 29 July 1928 to elect the 15 members of the Landtag. Early elections had been called due to Johann II, Prince of Liechtenstein, forcing the resignation of the Christian-Social People's Party (VP) led government of prime minister Gustav Schädler due to an embezzlement scandal. The Progressive Citizens' Party (FBP) won a majority of eleven seats, whereas the VP won four. Voter turnout was 93.1%.

The election campaign saw the VP defend Schädler's record and deny his involvement in the embezzlement scandal, whereas the FBP blamed the former for poor economic conditions in Liechtenstein and called for those complicit in the scandal to pay damages. Following the elections, Josef Hoop of the FBP became prime minister. The new government was sworn in on 4 August 1928. The election was followed by 42 consecutive years of FBP-led governments, only ending in the 1970 elections.

== Background ==
In the April 1926 elections, called early after the Progressive Citizens' Party (FBP) refused to take their seats in the Landtag, the Christian-Social People's Party (VP) won a majority of nine seats, while the FBP won six. As a result, the VP majority government under the leadership of prime minister Gustav Schädler remained.

During the government's term, the 1927 Liechtenstein flood took place, destroying large portions of Schaan, Gamprin and Ruggell, reaching as far as Tosters, Austria. The flood resulted in the deaths of two people and cost Liechtenstein 3.5 million Swiss francs in repairs, severely setting back the country's financial development.

In June 1928 leading members of the VP were arrested for embezzling funds from the National Bank of Liechtenstein for various speculative transactions. Once the scandal came to light, the opposition FBP demanded an investigation, the resignation of Schädler's government, and that new elections to be held. Johann II, Prince of Liechtenstein, who blamed the VP for the scandal, refused to meet Schädler in Vienna. Following a meeting with FBP representatives instead, the prince pressured Schädler's government to resign, which it did on 15 June. Prince Alfred of Liechtenstein was placed as acting prime minister, and fresh elections were called. Despite the VP Landtag members initially refusing to accept the resignation, believing it to be unconstitutional, Johann II defended the dismissal as necessary for Liechtenstein's security.

== Campaign ==
Both the VP and FBP campaigned primarily on their respective party newspapers − the Liechtensteiner Nachrichten and Liechtensteiner Volksblatt. The FBP blamed the VP for poor economic conditions in Liechtenstein and for the embezzlement scandal; the party called for those complicit in the scandal to pay for damages. In addition, the FBP accused Schädler and Wilhelm Beck, President of the Landtag, of gross negligence in regards to the national bank and the embezzlement scandal.

Conversely, the VP defended Schädler's record as prime minister, denied him and Beck having any involvement in the scandal, and considered Schädler's dismissal unjustified. In addition, the VP accused the FBP of being complicit in the scandal, particularly government councillor Peter Büchel. The VP criticized the FBP for exploiting the scandal in a way that was against Liechtenstein's interests, and accused the party of providing Johann II false information.

== Electoral system ==
The 15 members of the Landtag were elected via a majority system from two constituencies, Oberland with 9 seats and Unterland with 6 seats. Candidates that received the majority of votes in a constituency were elected. If a constituency did not receive enough elected candidates, then a second round would be held. Landtag members sit for a four-year term. Once formed, the Landtag elects the prime minister and two government councillors who govern in a cabinet. The prime minister is appointed for a six-year term, while government councillors sit a four-year term. Only men aged 21 and above were eligible to vote.

== Candidates ==
A total of 30 candidates were presented for the election.

Oberland	FBP	VP
Oberland	Ferdinand Risch; Georg Vogt; Anton Frommelt; Heinrich Brunhart; Oswald Walser; Josef Negele; Fritz Walser; Emil Walch; Ludwig Marxer	Josef Gassner; Basil Vogt; Gustav Ospelt; Franz Amann; Alois Jehle; Baptist Quaderer; Emil Bargetze; Adolf Frommelt
Unterland	FBP	VP
Unterland	Peter Büchel; Emil Batliner; Franz Josef Marxer; Wilhelm Büchel; Franz Xaver Hoop; Karl Kaiser	Adolf Goop; Georg Jäger; Felix Büchel; Wilhelm Marxer; Albrecht Marxer; Franz Josef Hasler
Source: Vogt

== Results ==
The FBP won a majority of eleven seats, a five seat increase from their April 1926 performance, whereas the VP won four at a five seat decrease. Voter turnout was 93.1%.

Party	First round			Second round			Total seats	+/–
Party	Votes	%	Seats	Votes	%	Seats	Total seats	+/–
Progressive Citizens' Party	8,890	55.96	11	199	27.75	0	11	+5
Christian-Social People's Party	6,995	44.04	3	518	72.25	1	4	–5
Total	15,885	100.00	14	717	100.00	1	15	0
Total votes	2,101	–		717	–			
Registered voters/turnout	2,257	93.09						
Source: Vogt

=== By electoral district ===
==== First round ====
Electoral district	Seats	Party	Elected members	Votes	Seats won	+/–
Oberland	9	Progressive Citizens' Party	Heinrich Brunhart; Anton Frommelt; Ferdinand Risch; Georg Vogt; Oswald Walser	6250	5	▲5
Oberland	9	Christian-Social People's Party	Josef Gassner; Gustav Ospelt; Basil Vogt	5490	3	▼5
Unterland	6	Progressive Citizens' Party	Emil Batliner; Peter Büchel; Wilhelm Büchel; Franz Xaver Hoop; Karl Kaiser; Franz Josef Marxer	2640	6	0
Unterland	6	Christian-Social People's Party	–	1505	0	0
Source: Vogt

==== Second round ====
Franz Amann and Adolf Frommelt, both belonging to the VP, tied for 689 votes. As only one candidate could progress to the second round, it was put up to lottery to decide which candidate would be selected, which ultimately went in favour of Amann.

Electoral district	Seats	Party	Seats won	Elected members	Votes
Oberland	1	Christian-Social People's Party	1	Franz Amann	518
Oberland	1	Progressive Citizens' Party	0	–	199
Source: Vogt

== Aftermath ==
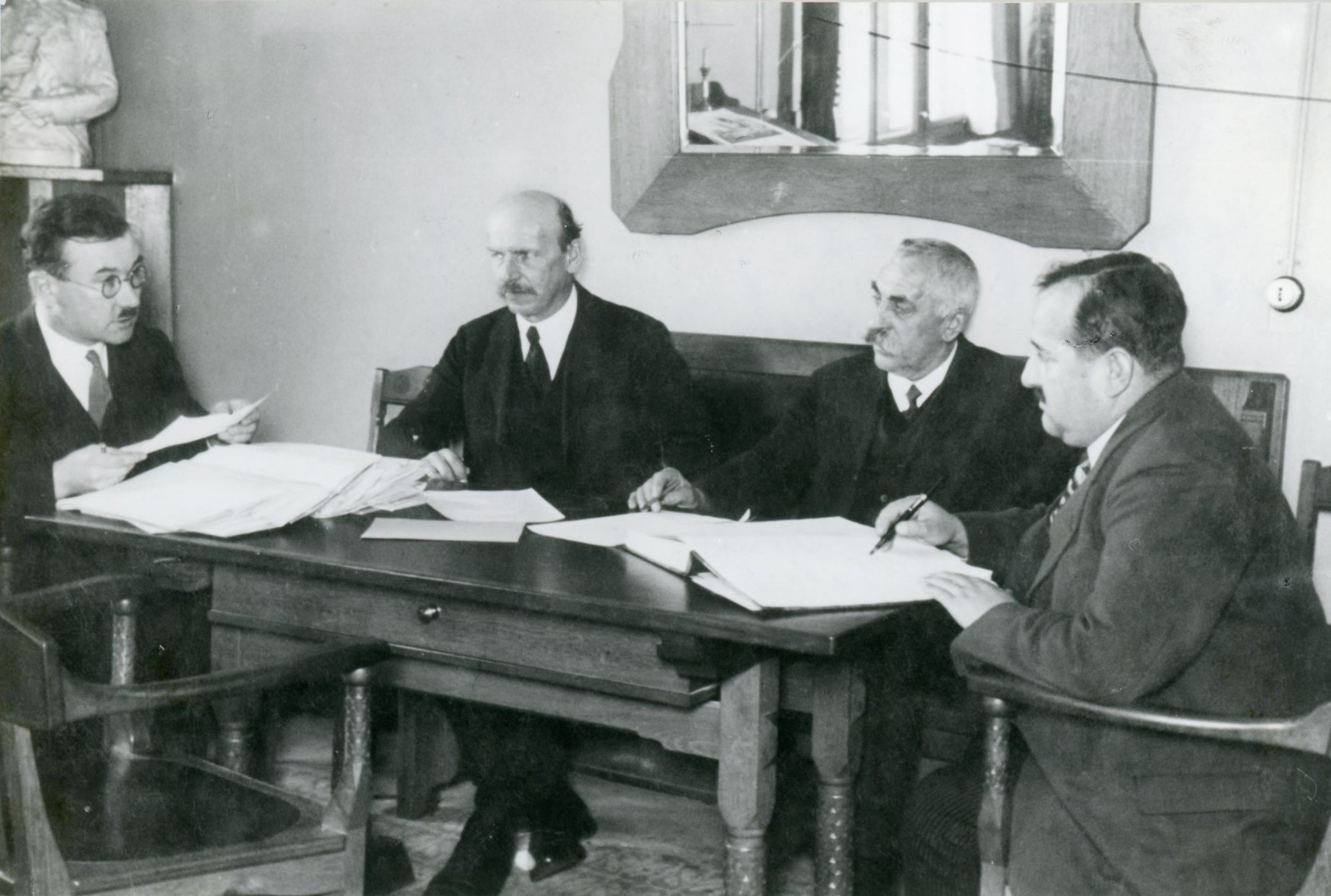
The government of Josef Hoop

In the opening session of the new Landtag, the VP demanded voluntary proportional representation from the FBP, including having a VP member as deputy prime minister and one government councillor. This former was rejected by the FBP however, as following the January and April 1926 elections, the party had a larger seat share and only received one government councillor, and thus the FBP ultimately agreed to appoint one VP member to government. However, motivated by a desire to not remain in the opposition for long, the VP renounced participation in government.

Despite the FBP's interest in Prince Alfred remaining as prime minister, he declined the position. As such, Ludwig Marxer recommended his friend Josef Hoop who was working in St. Gallen for the position; Hoop was chosen primarily due to him being largely uninvolved in previous political affairs. The new government was elected on 4 August 1936, with Marxer himself becoming deputy prime minister. Anton Frommelt of the FBP was elected as President of the Landtag, with Gustav Ospelt of the VP as vice president.

The VP suffered a significant defeat, the scandal and the election together are considered the fall of the party. It is also considered the demise of Beck as a national figure, as he was partially blamed for the scandal as chairman of the bank's board of directors; though he continued to lead the party, the membership largely became aimless. There was a myth that the VP lost votes as seasonal workers were unable to participate in the election due to being abroad, but this is unsupported by voting patterns from similar elections.

The election was followed by 42 consecutive years of FBP-led governments, only ending in the 1970 elections with the party's defeat to the VP's successor party Patriotic Union.
