= First Josef Hoop cabinet =

Governing body of Liechtenstein (1928–1936)

- Government of Liechtenstein

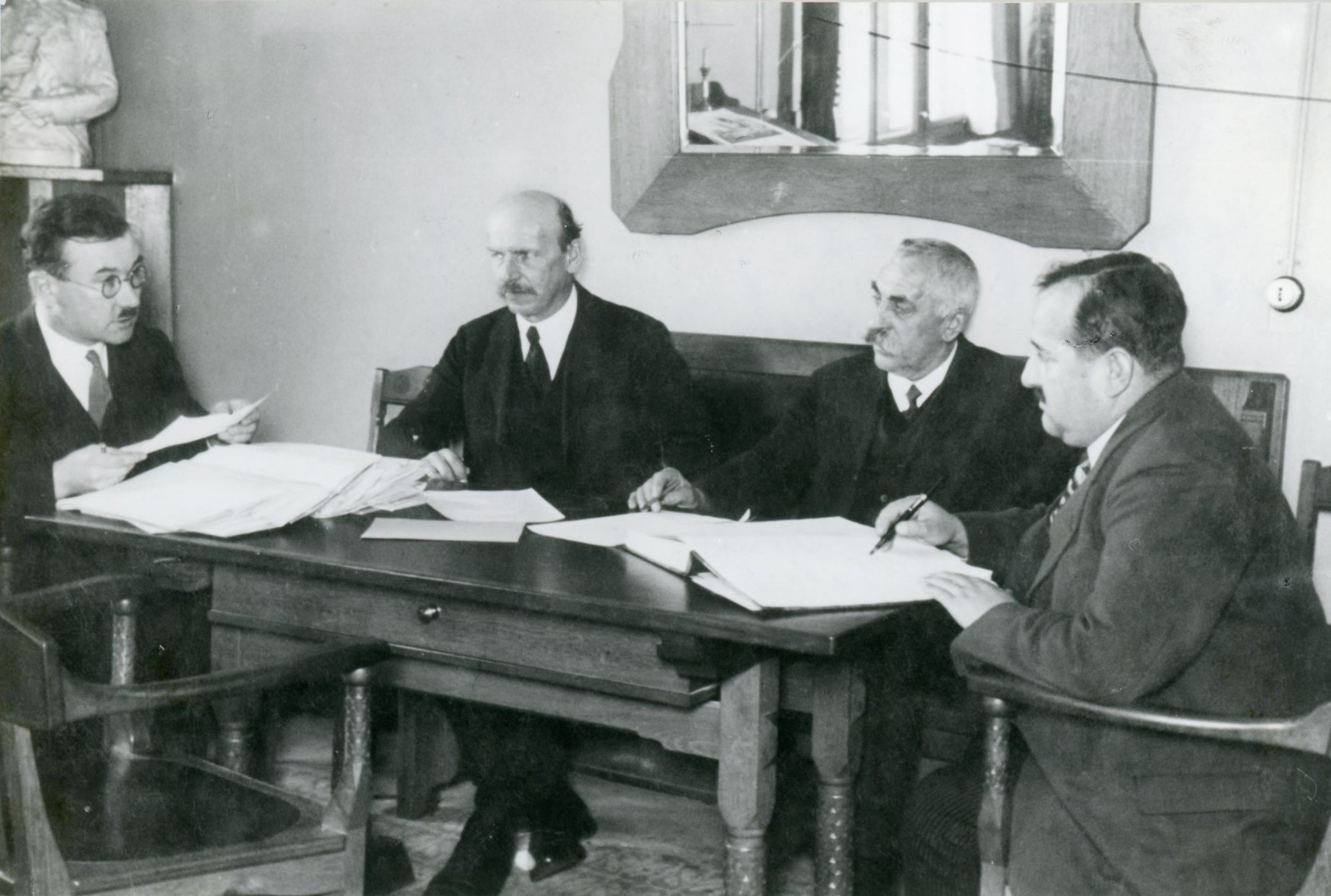
- Hoop's cabinet in 1928.
- Date formed: 6 August 1928
- Date dissolved: 28 February 1936

People and organisations
- Head of state: Johann II; Franz I
- Head of government: Josef Hoop
- Deputy head of government: Ludwig Marxer; Anton Frommelt
- Total no. of members: 6
- Member parties: FBP
- Status in legislature: Majority

History
- Election: 1928 1930 1932
- Predecessor: Gustav Schädler cabinet
- Successor: Second Josef Hoop cabinet

The first Josef Hoop cabinet was the governing body of Liechtenstein from 6 August 1928 to 28 February 1936. It was appointed by Johann II and continued by his successor Franz I. It was chaired by Josef Hoop.

== History ==
The government of Gustav Schädler was forced to resign by Johann II in the wake of an embezzlement scandal involving the National Bank of Liechtenstein and early elections were called. The 1928 Liechtenstein general election resulted in a win for the Progressive Citizens' Party and Josef Hoop was appointed as Prime Minister of Liechtenstein. The party was able to govern alone and in the 1930 Liechtenstein by-election was the sole party in the Landtag of Liechtenstein until 1932 when it once again entered a coalition with the Christian-Social People's Party.

The government's term was characterized by the Great Depression in addition to the building of a 23km long inland canal in order to increase the percentage of arable land within the country and to create job opportunities within the country, which was approved in 1930 and started construction in 1931.

It also tried to diffuse domestic tensions within Liechtenstein, specially with increasing antisemitic agitation within the country throughout the 1930s, inspired by the rise of Nazi Germany in 1933 and the anti-Jewish laws which led to a large number of Jews taking refuge in the country. Most notably, the Rotter kidnapping was designed to be an impetus for the formation of an organized Liechtenstein group, but it instead held back efforts for a time.

After the 1936 Liechtenstein general election the cabinet was dissolved and succeeded by the Second Josef Hoop cabinet on 28 February 1936.

== Members ==
Picture	Name	Term	Party
Prime Minister
	Josef Hoop	6 August 1928 – 28 February 1936	Progressive Citizens' Party
Deputy Prime Minister
	Ludwig Marxer	6 August 1928 – 20 June 1933	Progressive Citizens' Party
	Anton Frommelt	20 June 1933 – 28 February 1936	Progressive Citizens' Party
Government councillors
	Peter Büchel	6 August 1928 – 28 February 1936	Progressive Citizens' Party
	Josef Gassner	6 August 1928 – 18 March 1932	Progressive Citizens' Party
	Josef Steger	18 March 1932 – 28 February 1936	Progressive Citizens' Party

== See also ==
- Politics of Liechtenstein
