= January 1926 Liechtenstein general election =

- 10 January 1926 (first round); 24 January 1926 (second round)
- All 15 seats in the Landtag; 8 seats needed for a majority
- Turnout: 92.38% (▲6.94pp)
Party	Leader	Seats	+/–
VP	Gustav Schädler	9	−2
FBP	Bernhard Risch	6	+2
This lists parties that won seats. See the complete results below.
Results by constituency
Prime Minister before	Prime Minister after
Gustav Schädler; VP	Gustav Schädler; VP

General elections were held in Liechtenstein on 10 and 24 January 1926 to elect the 15 members of the Landtag. The Christian-Social People's Party (VP) won nine seats and retained its majority in the Landtag, with the Progressive Citizens' Party (FBP) winning six.

The election campaign was marked by accusations and personal attacks from both parties. Following the election, the FBP attempted to nominate Ludwig Marxer to government against the will of the VP, which subsequently resulted in fresh elections being called in April.

== Background ==
In the 1922 elections, the first held under the 1921 constitution, the Christian-Social People's Party (VP) won a majority of eleven seats, and the Progressive Citizens' Party (FBP) won four. The VP subsequently formed a majority government under the leadership of Gustav Schädler.

Schädler's term in office was marked by political and economic reorientation towards Switzerland. His government successfully negotiated the establishment of a customs union between the two countries, which took effect in 1924, along with the adoption of the swiss franc the same year. His government was also responsible for reorientating the country's administration to the recently introduced 1921 constitution.

== Electoral system ==
The 15 members of the Landtag were elected via a majority system from two constituencies, Oberland with 9 seats and Unterland with 6 seats. Candidates that received the majority of votes in a constituency were elected. If a constituency did not receive enough elected candidates, then a second round would be held. Landtag members sit for a four-year term. Once formed, the Landtag elects the prime minister and two government councillors who govern in a cabinet. The prime minister is appointed for a six-year term, while government councillors sit a four-year term. Only men aged 21 and above were eligible to vote.

== Campaign ==
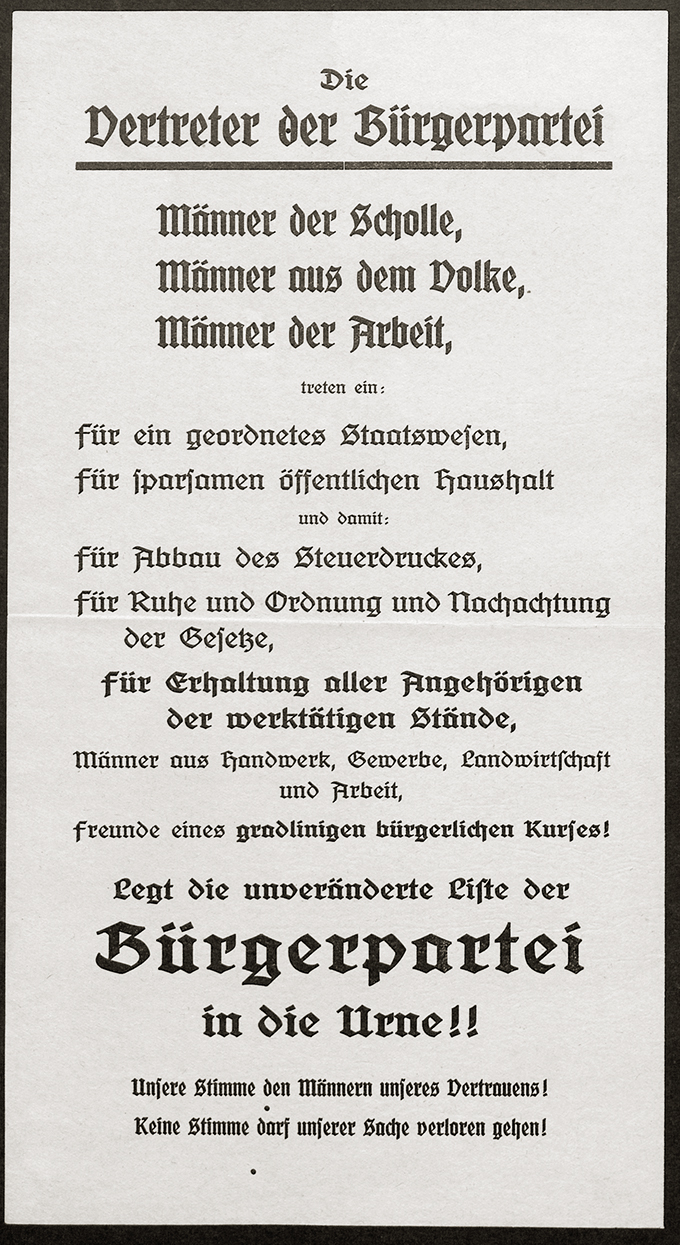
FBP electoral leaflet

Both the VP and FBP campaigned on their respective newspapers, the Liechtensteiner Nachrichten and Liechtensteiner Volksblatt, also frequently using leaflets on issues. The FBP attacked the VP government for supporting the class lottery in Liechtenstein, calling it a "fraudulent enterprise". Conversely, the VP highlighted Liechtenstein's economic growth and increasing ties between the country and the House of Liechtenstein.

The election campaign was marked by accusations and personal attacks by both parties, which primarily included leaflets circulating alleged scandals and attacks on members of the respective parties. As a result, there were numerous complaints of "violations against the safety of one's honour" by both parties. Notably Wilhelm Beck, President of the Landtag, was reported to the police for allegedly supporting republican views when he attacked Prince Karl Aloys of Liechtenstein.

== Candidates ==
Oberland	FBP	VP
Oberland	Oswald Walser; Emil Risch; Heinrich Brunhart; Johann Schädler; Ferdinand Risch; Ludwig Marxer; Emil Walch; Fritz Walser	Emil Bargetze; Wilhelm Beck; Johann Jakob Feger; Josef Gassner; Alois Jehle; Baptist Quaderer; Andreas Vogt; Anton Walser
Unterland	FBP	VP
Unterland	Emil Batliner; Peter Büchel; Wilhelm Büchel; Franz Xaver Hoop; Karl Kaiser; Franz Josef Marxer	Johann Büchel; Arnold Hoop; Josef Marxer; Felix Gubelmann; Georg Jäger; Adolf Goop
Source: Vogt

== Results ==
The VP won nine seats, a two-seat decrease from their 1922 performance, and retained its majority in the Landtag. The FBP won six, at an increase of two.

Party	First round			Second round			Total seats	+/–
Party	Votes	%	Seats	Votes	%	Seats	Total seats	+/–
Christian-Social People's Party	7,460	51.46	8	676	51.60	1	9	–2
Progressive Citizens' Party	7,037	48.54	6	634	48.40	0	6	+2
Total	14,497	100.00	14	1,310	100.00	1	15	0
Total votes	2,038	–						
Registered voters/turnout	2,206	92.38						
Source: Nohlen & Stöver, Vogt

=== By electoral district ===
==== First round ====
Electoral district	Seats	Party	Elected members	Votes	Seats won	+/–
Oberland	9	Christian-Social People's Party	Emil Bargetze; Wilhelm Beck; Johann Jakob Feger; Josef Gassner; Alois Jehle; Baptist Quaderer; Andreas Vogt; Anton Walser	5,522	8	0
Oberland	9	Progressive Citizens' Party	–	4,718	0	0
Unterland	6	Progressive Citizens' Party	Emil Batliner; Peter Büchel; Wilhelm Büchel; Franz Xaver Hoop; Karl Kaiser; Franz Josef Marxer	2,319	6	▲2
Unterland	6	Christian-Social People's Party	–	1,938	0	▼2
Source: Vogt

==== Second round ====
Electoral district	Seats	Party	Elected members	Votes	Seats won
Oberland	1	Christian-Social People's Party	Alois Frick	676	1
Oberland	1	Progressive Citizens' Party	–	634	0
Source: Vogt

== Aftermath ==
Following the election, against the will of the VP, the FBP attempted to nominate Ludwig Marxer as a government councillor. The VP refused to appoint Marxer to government and in response the FBP members of the Landtag refused to take their seats, gridlocking the Landtag; the subsequent government crisis resulted in Johann II, Prince of Liechtenstein calling for fresh elections in April.

== Bibliography ==
- Nohlen, Dieter; Stöver, Philip (2010). Elections in Europe: A data handbook. Nomos. ISBN 978-3-8329-5609-7.
- Vogt, Paul (1987). 125 Jahre Landtag (in German). Vaduz: Landtag of the Principality of Liechtenstein.
- Geiger, Peter (1997). Liechtenstein in den Dreissigerjahren 1928–1939 [Liechtenstein in the 1930s 1928–1939] (in German). Vol. 1. Zürich: Liechtenstein Institute, Chronos Verlag. ISBN 3-906393-28-3.
