= 1930 Liechtenstein by-election =

- 16 March 1930
- 4 of the 15 seats in the Landtag
| Party | Leader | Vote % | Seats | +/– |
|---|---|---|---|---|
| FBP | Josef Hoop | 100 | 15 | +4 |
| VP | Wilhelm Beck | 0 | 0 | −4 |
This lists parties that won seats. See the complete results below.
| Prime Minister before | Prime Minister after |
|---|---|
| Josef Hoop; FBP | Josef Hoop; FBP |

A by-election was held in Liechtenstein on 16 March 1930 to elect 4 vacancies in the Landtag. The by-election was called after the four Christian-Social People's Party (VP) members of the Landtag refused to return to their seats as they believed that the Landtag elected in the 1928 elections was a continuation of the term elected in the April 1926 elections. The ruling Progressive Citizens' Party (FBP) won all four of the seats unopposed, as the VP boycotted the elections.

The VP's withdrawal from the Landtag were also intended to tactically support an upcoming referendum for the introduction of proportional representation proposed by the party, but it was rejected by voters.

== Background and campaign ==
In the 1928 elections, held following the 1928 embezzlement scandal, the Progressive Citizens' Party (FBP) won a majority of eleven seats, while the Christian-Social People's Party (VP) won four. As a result, the FBP formed a majority government ultimately under the leadership of Josef Hoop.

In the opening session of the new Landtag, the VP demanded voluntary proportional representation from the FBP, including having a VP member as deputy prime minister and one government councillor. The former was rejected by the FBP however, as following the January and April 1926 elections the FBP had a larger seat share and only received one government councillor. As such, the FBP agreed to appoint one VP member to government. However, motivated by a desire to not remain in the opposition for long, the VP renounced participation in government.

To this end, the VP sought to force new elections by arguing that the 1928 elections had only been a continuation of the term dictated in the April 1926 elections. In a letter sent to the Landtag in December 1929, the VP members of the Landtag declared that they would not take their seats as their term had expired. Conversely, the governing FBP and Franz I, Prince of Liechtenstein recognized the 1928 elections as a new term; both sides used foreign legal interpretations to justify their actions. The Landtag, now composed solely of FBP members, issued an interpretation of the constitution supporting the government's position.

Franz I gave the government full authority to attempt to have the VP Landtag members return, but the VP refused to do so. In response, the Landtag passed a motion to formally dismiss the members on 11 February 1930 and called for a by-election to fill the vacancies. The VP boycotted the elections, instead calling for blank ballots, and thus all the FBP candidates were elected unopposed.

The VP's withdrawal from the Landtag was also intended to tactically support the upcoming VP-initiated referendum on the introduction of proportional representation, but primarily due to opposition from the FBP it was rejected by voters by a significant margin. Under the proposed electoral law, early elections being called would not constitute a new electoral term, meaning that new elections would have been held in 1930 had the law been approved.

== Electoral system ==
The 4 members of the Landtag were elected via a majority system in the Oberland constituency, where candidates who received the majority of votes in the constituency were elected. If the constituency did not receive enough elected candidates, then a second round would be held. Only men aged 21 and above were eligible to vote.

== Results ==
All four seats were won by the FBP unopposed. Until the 1932 elections, all 15 members of the Landtag belonged to the FBP.

| Party | Votes | % | Seats |
|---|---|---|---|
| Progressive Citizens' Party | 2,719 | 100.00 | 4 |
| Total | 2,719 | 100.00 | 4 |
| Total votes | 1,343 | – | |
Source: Vogt

=== By electoral district ===
| Electoral district | Seats | Party | Votes | Elected members | Seats won |
|---|---|---|---|---|---|
| Oberland | 4 | Progressive Citizens' Party | 2719 | Josef Ospelt; Bernhard Risch; Johann Schädler; Fritz Walser | 4 |
Source: Vogt
