= Josef Steger (politician) =

Liechtenstein politician (1879–1963)

Liechtenstein government councillor
- In office 18 March 1932 – 28 February 1936
- Prime Minister: Josef Hoop
- In office 16 March 1923 – 1926
- Prime Minister: Gustav Schädler

Member of the Landtag of Liechtenstein for Oberland
- In office 5 April 1926 – 15 July 1928

Personal details
- Born: 5 October 1879 Balzers, Liechtenstein
- Died: 18 February 1963 (aged 83) Balzers, Liechtenstein
- Party: Progressive Citizens' Party (after 1932); Christian-Social People's Party
- Spouse: Anna Wille (m. 1920; died 1922)
- Children: Gregor Steger

Josef Steger (5 October 1879 – 18 February 1963) was a farmer and politician from Liechtenstein who served as a government councillor from 1923 to 1926 and again from 1932 to 1936. He also served in the Landtag of Liechtenstein from 1926 to 1928

== Life ==
Steger was born on 5 October 1879 in Balzers as the son of baker Johann Anton Steger and Louisa (née Frick) as one of ten children. He worked as a bricklayer and a farmer.

From 1924 to 1927 and again from 1930 to 1933 served as a member of the Balzers municipal council as a member of the Christian-Social People's Party (VP). From April 1926 to 1928 he served in the Landtag of Liechtenstein, during which time he was also a member of the Landtag's finance commission and the state committee. Steger was a government councillor from 1923 to 1926 under the government of Gustav Schädler, and again from 1932 to 1936 under the government of Josef Hoop, during which time he switched party to the Progressive Citizens' Party.

Following the 1927 Rhine flood, he was a member of the state aid commission aimed at aiding the recovery effort. He was a member of the supervisory board of the National Bank of Liechtenstein from 1936 to 1945.

Steger married Anna Wille (25 January 1891 – 26 January 1922) on 12 April 1920 and they had one child together. He died on 18 February 1963, aged 83. His son Gregor Steger also served as a government councillor from 1965 to 1970.

== Bibliography ==
- Vogt, Paul (1987). 125 Jahre Landtag (in German). Vaduz: Landtag of the Principality of Liechtenstein.
