= Gustav Schädler cabinet =

Governing body of Liechtenstein (1922–1928)

- Government of Liechtenstein

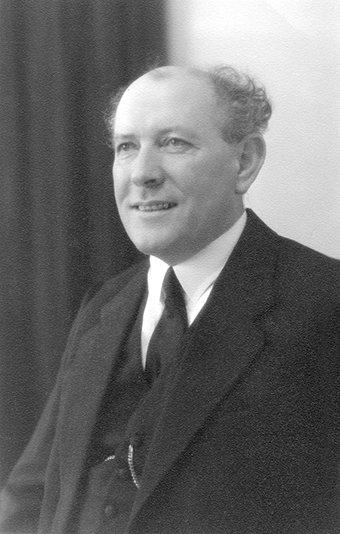
- Date formed: 10 June 1922
- Date dissolved: 15 June 1928

People and organisations
- Head of state: Johann II
- Head of government: Gustav Schädler
- Deputy head of government: Alfons Feger
- Total no. of members: 6
- Member parties: FBP; VP
- Status in legislature: Majority

History
- Election: 1922 January 1926 April 1926
- Predecessor: Josef Ospelt cabinet
- Successor: First Josef Hoop cabinet

The Gustav Schädler cabinet was the governing body of Liechtenstein from 10 June 1922 to 15 June 1928. It was appointed by Johann II and was chaired by Gustav Schädler.

== History ==
The Josef Ospelt cabinet was disbanded 27 April 1922 following Josef Ospelt's resignation as Prime Minister of Liechtenstein in April 1922. After a month period of acting Prime Minister's by Alfons Feger and Felix Gubelmann the 1922 Liechtenstein general election resulted in a win for the Christian-Social People's Party and Gustav Schädler was appointed as Prime Minister.

The government's term was characterized by being responsible for creating a monetary union with Switzerland in 1924. It also oversaw the passing of a tax law referendum in 1922. Lawyers Wilhelm Beck and Emil Beck (no relation) wrote the Liechtenstein Personal and Company law, which came into force in 1926.

The government was the subject of an embezzlement scandal involving the National Bank of Liechtenstein in 1928. Johann II forced the government to resign in June 1928 as a result, and early elections were called. Schädler was not barred from re-election, but lost the 1928 Liechtenstein general election and was succeeded by Josef Hoop in the First Hoop cabinet.

== Members ==
Picture	Name	Term	Party
Prime Minister
	Gustav Schädler	10 June 1922 – 15 June 1928	Christian-Social People's Party
Deputy Prime Minister
	Alfons Feger	10 June 1922 – 15 June 1928	Independent
Government councillors
	Felix Gubelmann	10 June 1922 – January 1926	Christian-Social People's Party
	Josef Steger	16 March 1923 – 1926	Christian-Social People's Party
	Alois Frick	January 1926 – 15 June 1928	Christian-Social People's Party
	Peter Büchel	1926 – 15 June 1928	Progressive Citizens' Party

== See also ==
- 1928 Liechtenstein embezzlement scandal
- Politics of Liechtenstein
