= 1926 Liechtenstein general election =

1926 Liechtenstein general election may refer to:

- January 1926 Liechtenstein general election, a general election held on 10 January
- April 1926 Liechtenstein general election, a general election held on 5 April
