= Anton Walser =

Anton Walser may refer to:

- Anton Walser (builder), Swiss-born American builder
- Anton Walser (politician), industrialist and political figure from Liechtenstein
