= 1928 Liechtenstein embezzlement scandal =

Embezzlement scandal in Liechtenstein

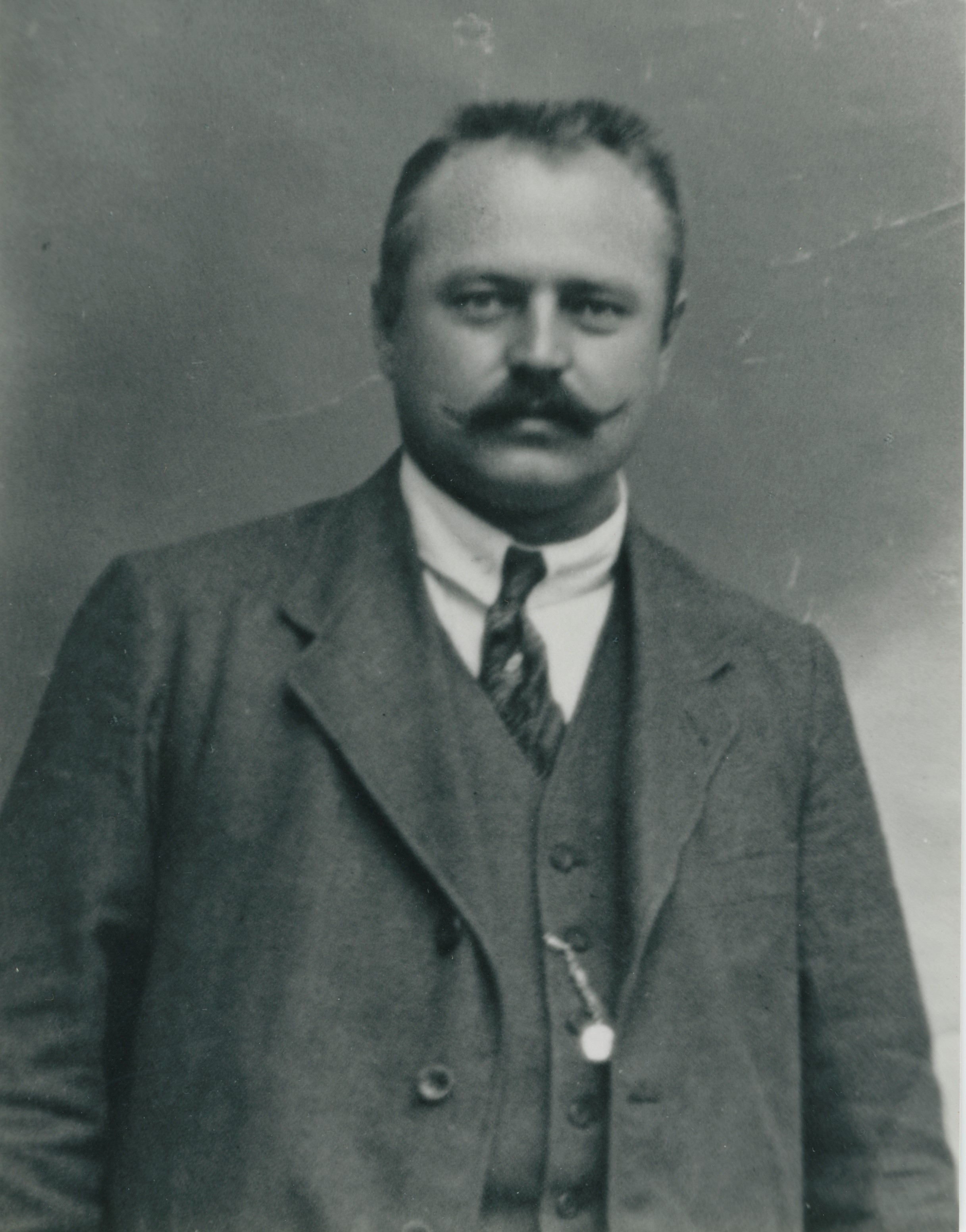
Anton Walser, considered the main participant in the scandal.

The 1928 Liechtenstein embezzlement scandal was a scandal involving leading members of the Christian-Social People's Party (VP), where it was revealed that they had embezzled funds from the National Bank of Liechtenstein for various speculative transactions. The scandal forced the government of prime minister Gustav Schädler to resign and early elections to be called, which saw a shift in power from the VP to the opposition Progressive Citizens' Party (FBP).

The scandal greatly undermined the political power of the VP and the later successor party Patriotic Union (VU), and alienated the party from princes Johann II and later Franz I. It is also generally considered the demise of Wilhelm Beck as a national figure, as he was also blamed for the scandal as chairman of the board's bank of directors.

== Background ==
Starting from 1926, leading members of the VP, Franz Thöny, Anton Walser, Niko Beck, and Rudolf Carbone embezzled funds from the National Bank of Liechtenstein for various speculative transactions. This included the expansion of the class lottery in Liechtenstein and Romania, which was operated by Walser and had the legal representation of President of the Landtag of Liechtenstein Wilhelm Beck, who was also chairman of the bank's board of directors. The program promised high income and employment for Liechtenstein, though proved controversial within both the Landtag of Liechtenstein and the general population.

During this time, Walser lived in Bucharest for almost a year and gained contacts with Romanian ministries. He founded several companies during his time there such as a bank and advertising company, which were intended to be used for the class lottery. In total, around 4 million Swiss francs were embezzled between 1926 and 1928. The national bank had previously been restructured by the VP in 1922, and many of its officials were replaced by allies of the party. By 1927, the bank's management and supervision was hampered by continued political conflict, and oversight boards failed to address the problem, allowing the embezzlement to continue.

== Arrests and investigations ==
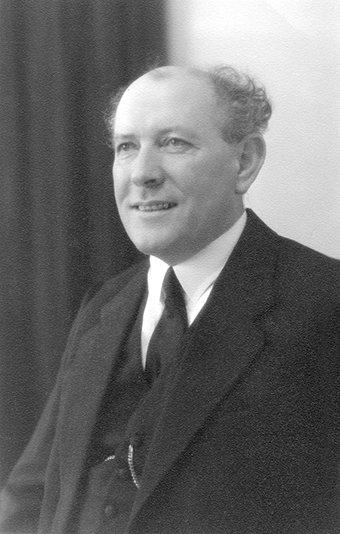
Gustav Schädler

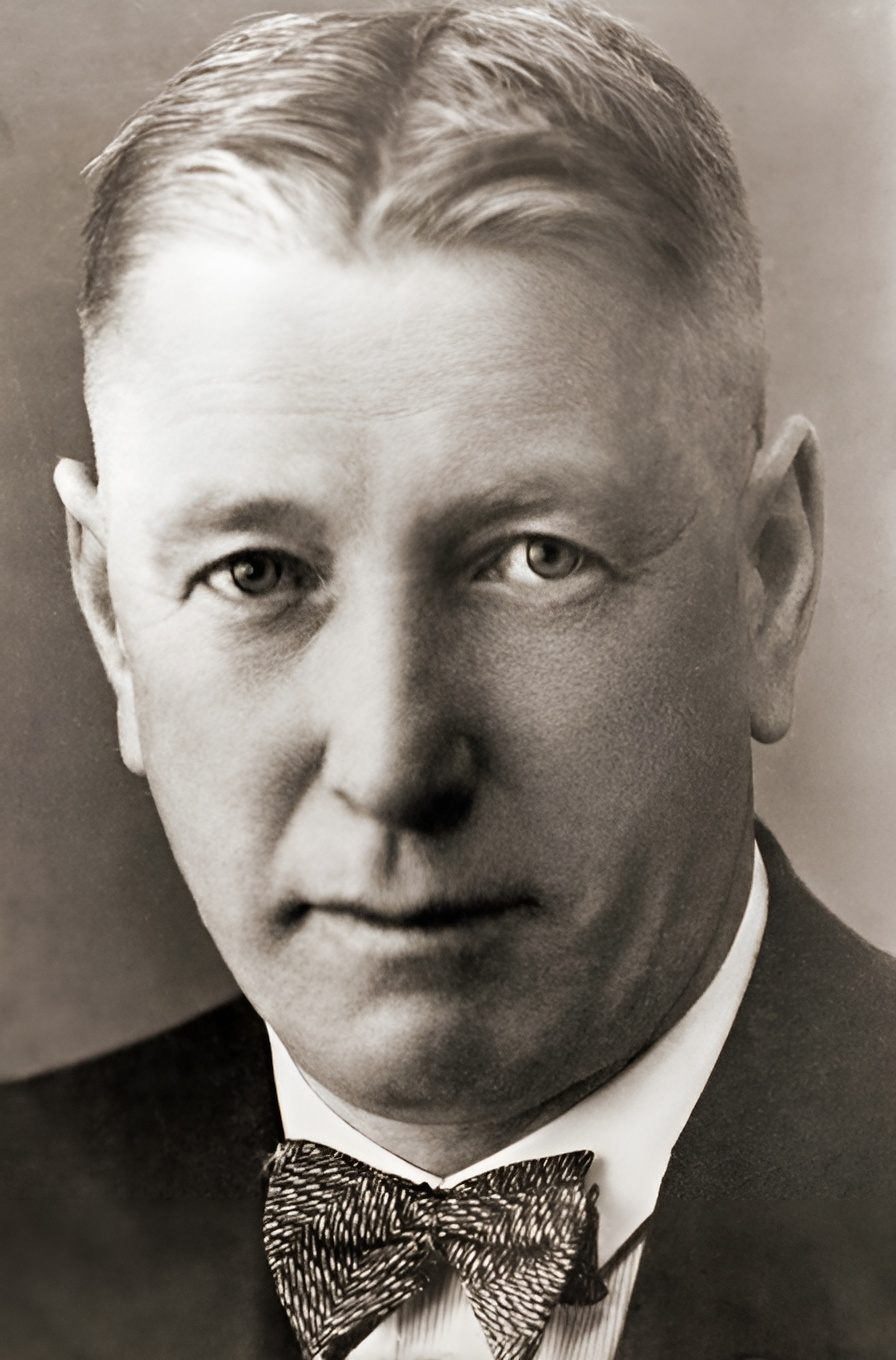
Wilhelm Beck

In June 1928, Walser, Niko Beck and Thöny were arrested, with Rudolf Carbone being arrested in June 1929. In November 1929, Walser, who was primarily responsible, was sentenced to four years in prison, with the rest being sentenced to three. Once the scandal came to light, the opposition Progressive Citizens' Party (FBP) demanded that the government of prime minister Gustav Schädler immediately resigned, the Landtag be disbanded, and that all individuals involved are investigated, particularly that of Wilhelm Beck, who was accused of gross negligence as the chairman of the bank's board of directors. The party threatened to hold a street demonstration to pressure the government if this did not happen.

Johann II and the FBP blamed the VP for the scandal, as the men arrested were members of the party and Walser himself was the party's chairman. Johann II refused to receive Schädler in Vienna and instead invited Josef Ospelt, Emil Batliner, Fritz Walser, and Ludwig Marxer (all of whom were members of the FBP), where they recommended the immediate dissolution of the Landtag, dismissal of Schädler's government, and for new elections to be held. As a result, Johann II demanded that Schädler resign and threatened to enact an emergency constitutional clause should he not do so. He resigned on 15 June 1928 and the following day Johann II dismissed the Landtag and early elections were called. Prince Alfred of Liechtenstein was temporarily appointed as acting as prime minister. The subsequent 1928 general election resulted in a majority of eleven seats for the FBP and Schädler was formally succeeded by Josef Hoop as prime minister.

The constitution gave the reigning prince the right to appoint the prime minister, but it had no specific clause for dismissing them. Due to Johann II forcing Schädler's resignation against the will of the VP, it raised questions regarding the constitution. The members of the Landtag belonging to the VP refused to accept the resignation, believing it to be unconstitutional. On the other hand, Johann II justified the dismissal as necessary for Liechtenstein's security. Due to the now-majority FBP agreeing with the dismissal and that the government complied by resigning, the constitutional ambiguities ultimately did not become a crisis in its own right.

In 1931, an indictment was conducted against Schädler in the State Court of Justice for violating supervisory and official duties in the administration of the savings bank. However, he was acquitted, partly because the statute of limitations had expired and partly because the breach of duty was not due to gross negligence. In 1932, a similar indictment was laid against Beck for violating supervisory and official duties in the administration of the board of the directors of the national bank. This resulted in him being ordered to pay damages in 1935; though he appealed this ruling, he did not live to see the outcome. The scandal is generally considered the end of Beck as a national figure in Liechtenstein.

The VP accused government councillor Peter Büchel of being complicit in the scandal, but he immediately demanded an investigation and was acquitted of all allegations.

== Aftermath and legacy ==
Johann II assumed responsibility for the losses caused by the embezzlement, and donated one million francs. Local communities pledged their land for a week in order to support economic recovery. In addition, another two million francs was taken out as a loan from Switzerland in order to restructure the national bank - the equivalent of two yearly budgets.

The VP believed that they had felt treated unfairly by Johann II by being refused an audience, as they believed that by only receiving people from the FBP that he was being fed biased and incomplete information on the scandal. The party remained alienated from him for the rest of his reign; this tension continued under his successor Franz I and the successor party Patriotic Union (VU). The rift between the prince and the party would not be resolved until 1938 when Franz Joseph II ascended to the throne. The scandal greatly undermined the political power of the VP and later the VU in Liechtenstein politics, with it being used as proof of alleged incompetency of the party; the VU would not form its own government until 1970 under Alfred Hilbe.

== Bibliography ==
- Geiger, Peter (1997). Liechtenstein in den Dreissigerjahren 1928–1939 (in German) (1st ed.). Zürich: Liechtenstein Institute. ISBN 3-906393-28-3.
