= April 1926 Liechtenstein general election =

- 5 April 1926
- All 15 seats in the Landtag; 8 seats needed for a majority
- Turnout: 93.47% (▲1.09pp)
Party	Leader	Vote %	Seats	+/–
VP	Gustav Schädler	52.19	9	0
FBP	Ludwig Marxer	47.81	6	0
This lists parties that won seats. See the complete results below.
Results by constituency
Prime Minister before	Prime Minister after
Gustav Schädler; VP	Gustav Schädler; VP

General elections were held in Liechtenstein on 5 April 1926 to elect the 15 members of the Landtag. Early elections were called due to a government crisis where the Christian-Social People's Party (VP) refused to elect Ludwig Marxer of the Progressive Citizens' Party (FBP) to government. The VP won won nine seats and retained its majority in the Landtag, with the Progressive Citizens' Party (FBP) winning six.

The election saw no change to the seat distribution, thus the government crisis continued. The crisis only came to an end after the summer recess of the Landtag when Marxer resigned as a government candidate and Peter Büchel was elected instead. As such, the majority government led by prime minister Gustav Schädler remained.

== Electoral system ==
The 15 members of the Landtag were elected via a majority system from two constituencies, Oberland with 9 seats and Unterland with 6 seats. Candidates that received the majority of votes in a constituency were elected. If a constituency did not receive enough elected candidates, then a second round would be held. Only men aged 21 and above were eligible to vote.

== Results ==
Party	Votes	%	Seats	+/–
Christian-Social People's Party	8,598	52.19	9	0
Progressive Citizens' Party	7,875	47.81	6	0
Total	16,473	100.00	15	0
Total votes	2,090	–		
Registered voters/turnout	2,236	93.47		
Source: Vogt

=== By electoral district ===
Electoral district	Seats	Party	Elected members	Votes	Seats won	+/–
Oberland	9	Christian-Social People's Party	Emil Bargetze; Wilhelm Beck; Johann Jakob Feger; Josef Gassner; Alois Jehle; Baptist Quaderer; Josef Steger; Andreas Vogt; Anton Walser	6644	9	0
Oberland	9	Progressive Citizens' Party	–	5495	0	0
Unterland	6	Progressive Citizens' Party	Emil Batliner; Peter Büchel; Wilhelm Büchel; Franz Xaver Hoop; Karl Kaiser; Franz Josef Marxer	2380	6	0
Unterland	6	Christian-Social People's Party	–	1954	0	0
Source: Vogt

== Bibliography ==
- Nohlen, Dieter; Stöver, Philip (2010). Elections in Europe: A data handbook. Nomos. ISBN 978-3-8329-5609-7.
- Vogt, Paul (1987). 125 Jahre Landtag (in German). Vaduz: Landtag of the Principality of Liechtenstein.
