= Gustav Schädler =

Prime Minister of Liechtenstein from 1922 to 1928

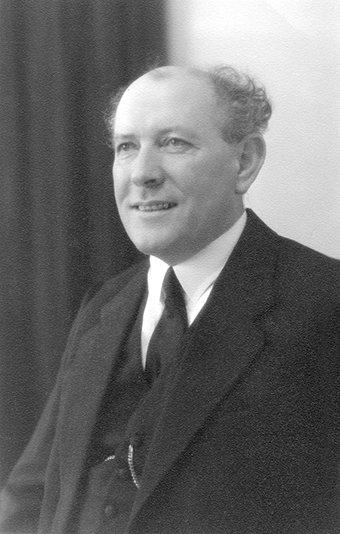

Prime Minister of Liechtenstein
- In office 10 June 1922 – 24 June 1928
- Monarch: Johann II
- Deputy: Alfons Feger
- Preceded by: Felix Gubelmann (acting)
- Succeeded by: Prince Alfred Roman of Liechtenstein (acting)

Liechtenstein government councillor
- In office 2 March 1922 – 10 June 1922
- Prime Minister: Josef Ospelt

Member of the Landtag of Liechtenstein
- In office 1919–1922

Personal details
- Born: 18 November 1883 Triesenberg, Liechtenstein
- Died: 19 June 1961 (aged 77) Vaduz, Liechtenstein
- Party: Christian-Social People's Party
- Spouse: Olga Real (m. 1918)
- Relations: Adolf Real (father-in-law)
- Children: 2

Gustav Schädler (/ˈʃɛdlər/, German: [ˈɡʊstaf ˈʃɛːdlɐ];18 November 1883 – 19 June 1961) was a teacher and politician from Liechtenstein who served as the Prime Minister of Liechtenstein from 1922 to 1928. He previously served as a government councillor in 1922 and in the Landtag of Liechtenstein from 1919 to 1922.

Starting his career as a teacher, he gained political prominence as a public speaker before serving in the Landtag of Liechtenstein and then as a government councillor as a member of the Christian Social People's Party (VP). He was a major proponent of Liechtenstein's constitutional revision, and represented the Vice President at the castle agreements in 1920. Appointed as prime minister in 1922, Schädler achieved forming a customs union with Switzerland and the reorientation of Liechtenstein's administration to the recently introduced 1921 constitution. Though his tenure, he also faced economic challenges such as the 1927 Alpine Rhine flood, and Liechtenstein consistently faced financial difficulties. He was forced to resign by Johann II as a result of an embezzlement scandal in 1928.

Following his resignation as prime minister, Schädler again worked as a teacher. He re-entered politics as an editor of the Liechtensteiner Vaterland during World War II. In 1946, he was sentenced to six months in prison due to illegal espionage for German intelligence agencies, but he did not serve the sentence due to health reasons. He died unexpectedly in 1961, after complications from surgery.

== Early life and career ==
Schädler was born on 18 November 1883 in Triesenberg as the son of Adolf Schädler and Maria, (née Beck) as one of five children. He attended teacher's training college in Bad Saulgau before being trained as a teacher in linguistics and history in Zurich from 1906 to 1912. From 1914 to 1922, he worked as a teacher in the state school in Vaduz.

Schädler, who had already risen to political promience as a public speaker, was appointed by Johann II to the Landtag of Liechtenstein in 1919 as a member of the Christian Social People's Party (VP), where he served until 1922. During this time, alongside Wilhelm Beck, he was a proponent for Liechtenstein's constitutional revision and political alignment towards Switzerland. In 1920 he, alongside Beck and Anton Walser, represented the VP at the castle agreements with Johann II and his representatives, which largely succeeded in fulfilling the party's demands towards the constitutional revision. He also wrote for the VP's press, and was a correspondent to the Swiss newspaper Neue Zürcher Zeitung.

Following the 1921 stamp affair Schädler, alongside Franz Xaver Gassner, were appointed to an investigative commission, which found deficiencies in the Liechtenstein stamping transactions and subsequently damaged the reputation of the country's stamps. He was appointed as a government councillor on 2 March 1922 in the Josef Ospelt cabinet. He also continued this position under the provisional governments of Alfons Feger and Felix Gubelmann.

== Prime Minister of Liechtenstein ==
Schädler was the second prime minister of Liechtenstein, serving from 6 June 1922 to 24 June 1928. The 1922 Liechtenstein general election resulted in a win for the VP, and following the resignation of Josef Ospelt, Schädler was appointed as prime minister.

Schädler's tenure as prime minister oversaw Liechtenstein's political and economic reorientation towards Switzerland. His government successfully negotiated the establishment of a customs union between the two countries, which took effect in 1924, along with the adoption of the swiss franc the same year. His government was also responsible for reorientating the country's administration to the recently introduced 1921 constitution. To support this, Schädler's government also adopted several laws created by Wilhelm Beck and Emil Beck (no relation); notably the Law on General State Administration in 1922 and tax law in 1922, property law in 1923, and state court law in 1925.

Following the 1926 elections, there was a government crisis when the VP refused to elect Ludwig Marxer as a government councillor. It directly led to early elections a few months later, and ended due to Marxer's resignation.

=== Economic policy ===
Liechtenstein consistently faced financial difficulties during Schädler's tenure. In 1922, 1925, 1927 and 1928 the country was forced to take loans from Switzerland. His government introduced the personal and corporate law in 1926, also written by Wilhelm and Emil Beck, which increased the amount of companies residing in Liechtenstein, and also invited investors primarily from Germany due to a lessened tax burden. Following a referendum in September 1925, the Lawena Power Plant resumed construction and was completed in 1927. It was deemed an economic necessity and was Liechtenstein's first source of domestic energy.

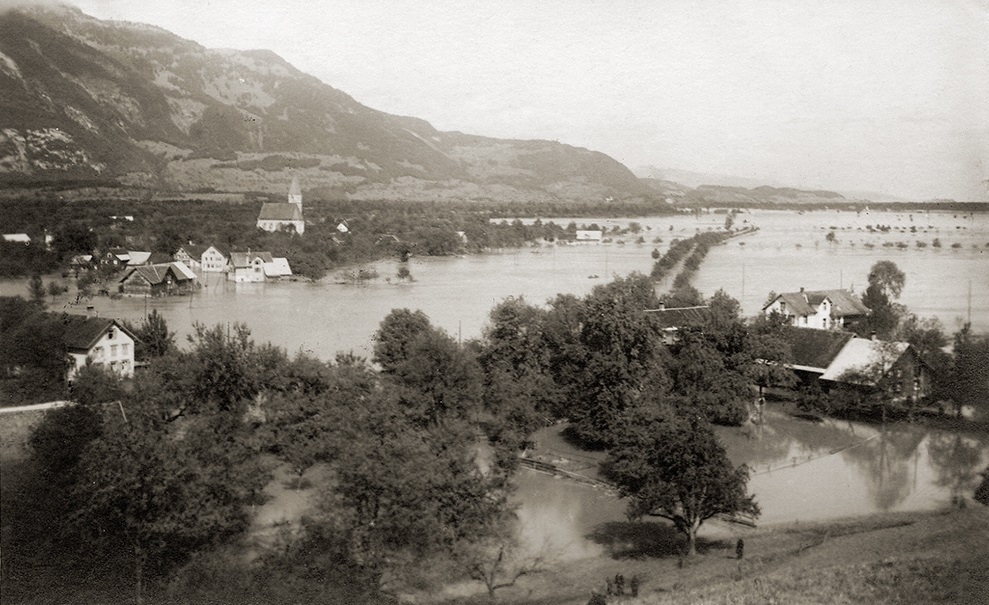
Ruggell in the 1927 Alpine Rhine flood

On 25 September 1927, the Alpine Rhine flooded and destroyed large portions of Schaan, Gamprin and Ruggell, resulting in the deaths of two people. The event had devasting effects on Liechtenstein's economy, and the recovery effort involved rescue efforts from the Austrian and Swiss militaries and clean-up from international scouts. Schädler was able to secure aid from Switzerland, but also had to take out a loan of 1.5 million Swiss francs. In addition, Johann II donated another million francs to support repairs. The disaster prompted the establishment of a Liechtenstein state savings and loan bank.

=== Embezzlement scandal and resignation ===
From 1926 to 1928, members of the VP, Franz Thöny, Anton Walser, Niko Beck, and Rudolf Carbone embezzled around 4 million francs from the National Bank of Liechtenstein for various speculative transactions. The national bank had previously been restructured by the VP in 1922, and many of its officials were replaced by allies of the party. By 1927, the bank's management and supervision was hampered by continued political conflict, and oversight boards failed to address the problem, allowing the embezzlement to continue.

When the scandal came to light in June 1928, the FBP demanded that Schädler's government immediately resign and the Landtag be dismissed. The party threatened to hold a street demonstration to pressure the government if this did not happen. Johann II, who blamed the VP for the scandal, refused to receive Schädler in Vienna and instead invited leading figures of the FBP, who recommended the dismissal of Schädler's government. As a result, Johann II demanded that Schädler resign and threatened to enact an emergency constitutional clause should he not do so. He resigned on 15 June 1928 and the following day Johann II dismissed the Landtag and early elections were called. Prince Alfred of Liechtenstein was temporarily appointed as acting as prime minister. The subsequent 1928 general election resulted in a majority for the FBP and he was succeeded by Josef Hoop as prime minister.

The constitution gave the reigning prince the right to appoint the prime minister, but it had no specific clause for dismissing them. Due to Johann II forcing Schädler's resignation against the will of the VP, it raised questions regarding the constitution. The VP believed that they had been treated unfairly by the prince; the members of the Landtag belonging to the VP refused to accept the resignation, believing it to be unconstitutional. On the other hand, Johann II justified the dismissal as necessary for Liechtenstein's security.

== Later life ==
Following his resignation as prime minister in 1928, Schädler again worked as a teacher in Vaduz until 1945. He was a member of the Liechtenstein school board from 1939 to 1945.

In 1931, an inditement was placed against Schädler in the Liechtenstein state court for violating supervisory and official duties in the administration of the national bank. However, he was later acquitted, partly because the charges had exceeded the statute of limitations and partly because his conduct was not judged to be the result of gross negligence.

Schädler, alongside Patriotic Union (VU) president Otto Schaedler, was the editor of the Liechtensteiner Vaterland from 1943 to 1944. During this time he wrote articles about Switzerland, supposedly for the German press, but it was used by German intelligence agencies. In 1946, he was sentenced to 6 months in prison for illegal espionage. The VU considered the conviction unfair, but ultimately he did not serve the sentence due to health reasons. He retired in 1945, but continued to contribute to the Neue Zürcher Zeitung by writing about Liechtenstein's history and culture.

== Personal life and death ==
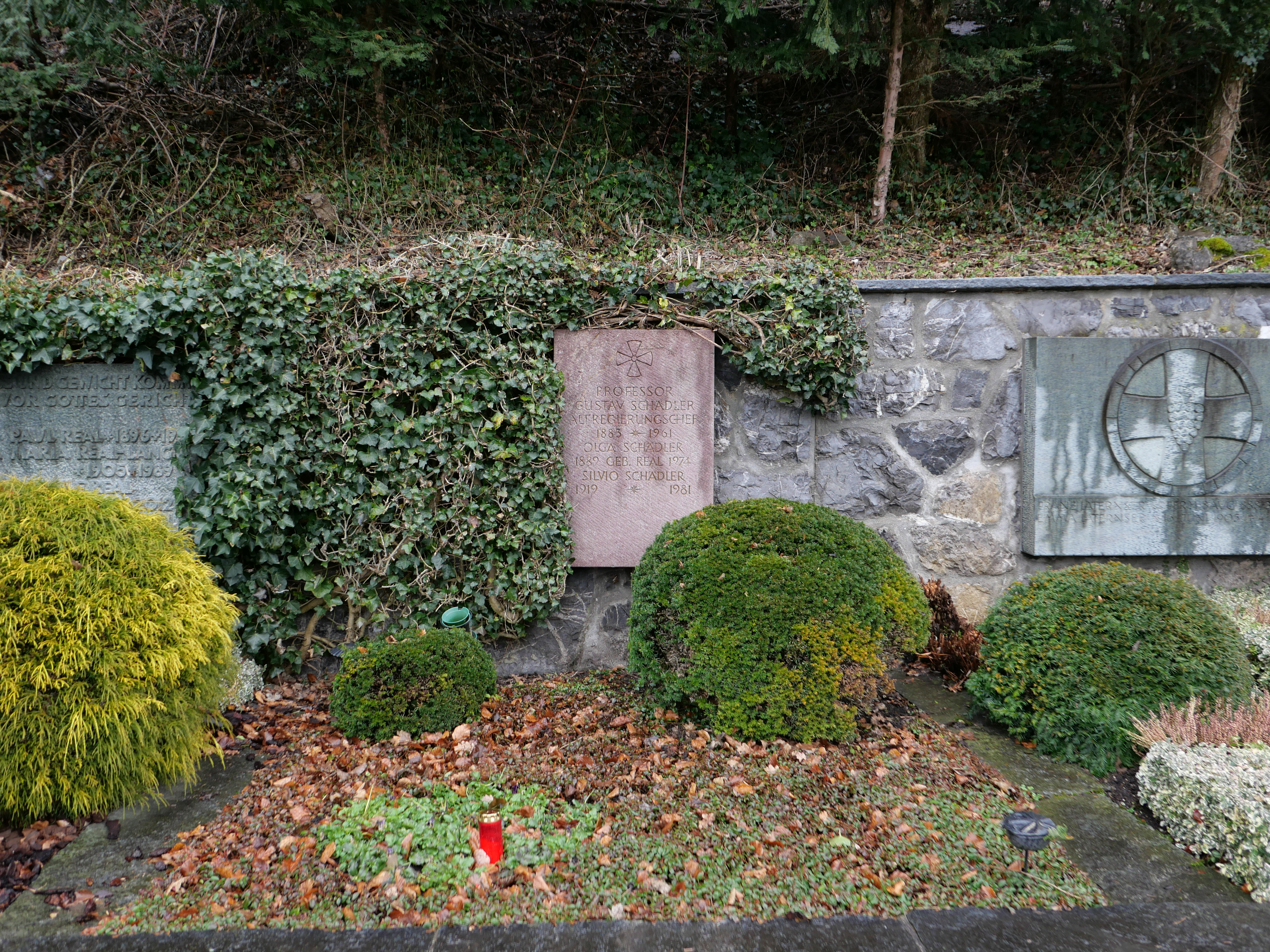
Schädler's family grave in Vaduz

Schädler married Olga Real (29 July 1889 – 26 July 1974), the daughter of Adolf Real, on 16 December 1918 and they had 2 children together. He was from Triesenberg, but lived in Vaduz from 1914.

Schädler, who suffered from a heart condition, died unexpectedly on 19 June 1961 due to complications from surgery he had undergone a few weeks prior. He was 77 years old.

== See also ==
- Politics of Liechtenstein
- Gustav Schädler cabinet

== Bibliography ==
- Vogt, Paul (1987). 125 Jahre Landtag (in German). Vaduz: Landtag of the Principality of Liechtenstein.
- Nohlen, Dieter; Stöver, Philip (2010). Elections in Europe: A data handbook. Nomos. ISBN 978-3-8329-5609-7.
- Geiger, Peter (1997). Liechtenstein in den Dreissigerjahren 1928–1939 [Liechtenstein in the 1930s 1928–1939] (in German). Vol. 1st. Zürich: Liechtenstein Institute. ISBN 3-906393-28-3.
