= Andreas Vogt =

Liechtenstein politician (1880–1958)

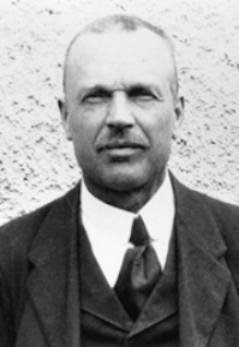

Member of the Landtag of Liechtenstein for Oberland
- In office 10 January 1926 – 15 July 1928

Personal details
- Born: 11 August 1880 Balzers, Liechtenstein
- Died: 25 March 1958 (aged 77) Balzers, Liechtenstein
- Party: Christian-Social People's Party
- Spouse(s): Regina Anna Birrer (m. 1906; died 1916) Maria Barbara Bischof (m. 1922)
- Relations: Walter Vogt (grandson)
- Children: 5

Andreas Vogt (11 August 1880 – 25 March 1958) was a Liechtensteiner carpenter and politician who served in the Landtag of Liechtenstein from 1926 to 1928. He faced controversy due to his self-declared republican and social democratic views.

== Life ==
Vogt was born on 11 August 1880 in Balzers as the son of his father by the same name and Cölestina Frick as one of seven children. He conducted an apprenticeship as a carpenter in Schaan, and he also worked as a carpenter in Switzerland and Germany. He later became a self-employed carpenter in his home-town of Balzers.

In 1920, Vogt was a member of the Christian-Social People's Party (VP)'s delegation towards the negotiations of the appointment of Josef Peer as Governor of Liechtenstein, in which the party opposed his appointment as they believed that the position should only be occupied by Liechtensteiners. Eventually it was agreed that Peer could take the position, but only for a 6-month period. Vogt led the founding event of the Liechtenstein Worker's Association, and was the association's first vice president from 1920 to 1924, then its president from 1924 to 1926.

From 1922 to 1926 he was a member of the Liechtenstein criminal court and a member of the Balzers municipal council from 1924 to 1927. From 1926 to 1928 he was a member of the Landtag of Liechtenstein. Vogt was a controversial figure within the Landtag, as on 25 November 1919 as a spectator to a session of the Landtag he yelled "Down with the government! Long live the republic!", for which the Progressive Citizens' Party heavily criticized him. Though he was charged for breach of the peace as a result of this incident, governor Prince Karl Aloys of Liechtenstein requested for Johann II, Prince of Liechtenstein to drop the charges in 1920.

Vogt defended himself by stating that he had only done so out of frustration towards Prince Karl Aloys, as he believed that his speech in the Landtag was defamatory against Wilhelm Beck, and that it was not directed against Johann II. According to his own accounts, he was a self-declared Liechtenstein republican and social democrat until the constitution of Liechtenstein was ratified in 1921. He did not seek re-election to the Landtag in the 1928 elections.

== Personal life ==
Vogt married Regina Anna Birrer (29 December 1879 – 5 June 1916) on 28 May 1906 and they had two children together. He then went on to marry Maria Barbara Bischof (26 January 1896 – 29 June 1960) on 27 November 1922 and they had another three children together. He died on 25 March 1958 in Balzers, aged 77 years old.

== Bibliography ==
- Vogt, Paul (1987). 125 Jahre Landtag (in German). Vaduz: Landtag of the Principality of Liechtenstein.
