= 1922 Liechtenstein general election =

- 5 February 1922 (first round); 16 February 1922 (second round)
- All 15 seats in the Landtag; 8 seats needed for a majority
- Turnout: 85.44% (▼4.87pp)
Party	Leader	Seats	+/–
Christian-Social People's Party	Gustav Schädler	11	+6
FBP	Josef Ospelt	4	−3
This lists parties that won seats. See the complete results below.
Results by constituency
Prime Minister before	Prime Minister after
Josef Ospelt; FBP	Josef Ospelt; FBP

General elections were held in Liechtenstein on 5 February 1922, with a second round on 16 February. They were the first elections held under the 1921 constitution, which resulted in some changes to the electoral system. The result was a victory for the opposition Christian-Social People's Party, which won 11 of the 15 seats.

== Electoral system ==
Under the new constitution the three seats in the Landtag appointed by the Prince were abolished. The number of seats in Oberland was increased from seven to nine, and in Unterland from five to six. The voting age was lowered from 24 to 21, although women were still not allowed to vote.

== Results ==
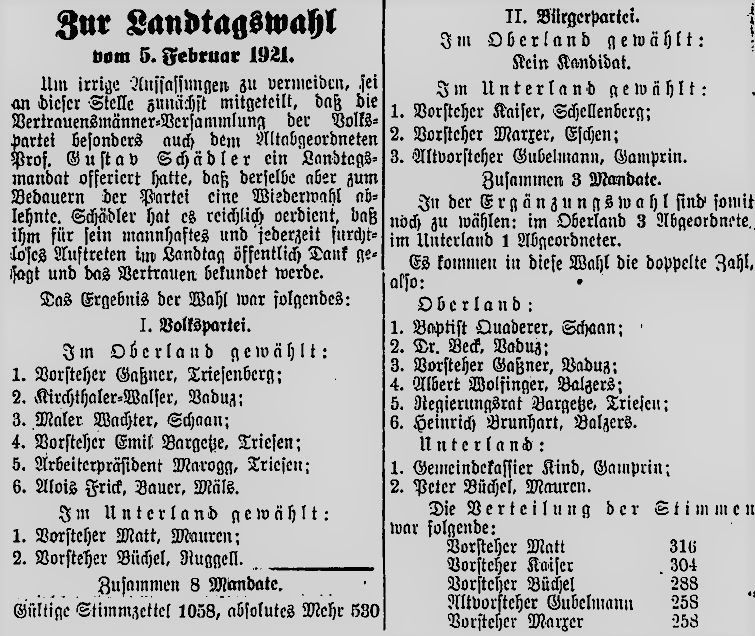
Announcement of the results of the first round in the Oberrheinische Nachrichten on 5 February 1922

Party	First round			Second round			Total seats	+/–
Party	Votes	%	Seats	Votes	%	Seats	Total seats	+/–
Christian-Social People's Party			8			3	11	+6
Progressive Citizens' Party			3			1	4	–3
Total			11			4	15	0
Total votes	1,667	–						
Registered voters/turnout	1,951	85.44						
Source: Nohlen & Stöver, Vogt

=== By electoral district ===
==== First round ====
Electoral district	Seats	Party	Seats won	Elected members
Oberland	9	Christian-Social People's Party	6	Emil Bargetze; Alois Frick; Josef Gassner; Augustin Marogg; Stefan Wachter; Anton Walser
Oberland	9	Progressive Citizens' Party	0	–
Unterland	6	Progressive Citizens' Party	3	Felix Gubelmann; Karl Kaiser; Josef Ignaz Marxer
Unterland	6	Christian-Social People's Party	2	Johann Büchel; Rudolf Matt
Source: Vogt

==== Second round ====
Electoral district	Seats	Party	Seats won	Elected members
Oberland	3	Christian-Social People's Party	3	Wilhelm Beck; Baptist Quaderer; Albert Wolfinger
Oberland	3	Progressive Citizens' Party	0	–
Unterland	1	Progressive Citizens' Party	1	Peter Büchel
Unterland	1	Christian-Social People's Party	0	–
Source: Vogt
