= Liechtensteiner Nachrichten =

Weekly newspaper in Liechtenstein from 1914 to 1936

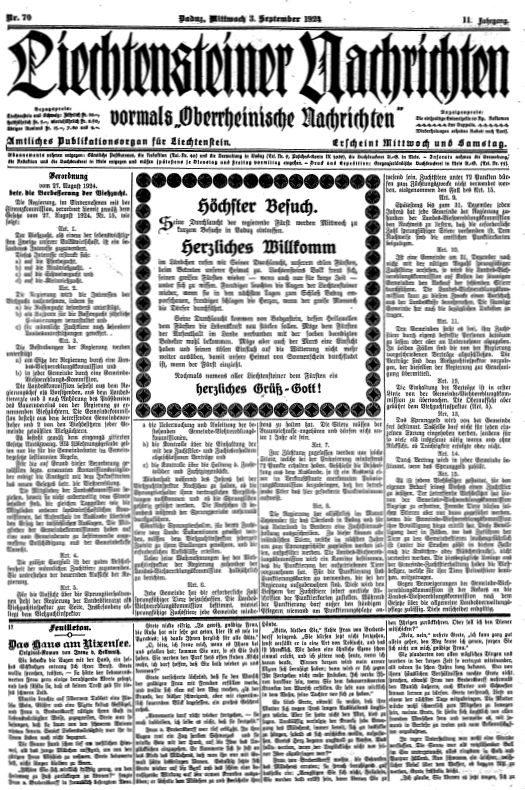
- Front page, 3 September 1924
- Founder: Wilhelm Beck
- Publisher: Sarganserländer Buchdruckerei AG
- Founded: 25 April 1914; 112 years ago
- Ceased publication: 1 January 1936; 90 years ago
- Political alignment: Christian-Social People's Party
- Language: German
- City: Vaduz
- Country: Liechtenstein

Liechtensteiner Nachrichten (lit. 'Liechtenstein News'), known as the Oberrheinische Nachrichten (lit. 'Upper Rhine News') until 1924, was a weekly newspaper published in Liechtenstein from 1914 to 1936. It was the official newspaper of the Christian-Social People's Party.

== History ==
The newspaper was first published as the Oberrheinische Nachrichten on 25 April 1914 in conjunction with the opposition movement formed by Wilhelm Beck against the government of Leopold Freiherr von Imhof, the Governor of Liechtenstein. It primarily advocated for the expansion of welfare, broader voting rights and a Liechtensteiner head of state, as Imhof was Austrian. The newspaper allowed for Beck's movement to gain significant support throughout World War I, leading to the November 1918 Liechtenstein putsch. When the Christian-Social People's Party was founded in 1918, the newspaper became the official newspaper of the party.

On 3 September 1924, the newspaper was renamed to Liechtensteiner Nachrichten. After the government of Gustav Schädler was forced to resign by Johann II in the wake of an embezzlement scandal involving the National Bank of Liechtenstein, the newspaper stood in opposition to the Progressive Citizens' Party.

In January 1936, Christian-Social People's Party and Liechtenstein Homeland Service merged to form the Patriotic Union and the newspaper was subsequently dissolved and succeeded by the Liechtensteiner Vaterland.

== List of editors (1914–1936) ==
Name	Term	Ref(s).
Wilhelm Beck	1914–1919	
Arnold Gassner	1919	
Wilhelm Beck	1919–1921	
Josef Vogt	1921	
Gottlieb Gassner	1921–1923	
Alphons Thöny	1923–1928	
Gottlieb Risch	1928	
Josef Sele	1928–1930	
Max Beck	1930–1932	
Alphons Thöny	1932	
Max Beck	1932–1936	

== See also ==
- Christian-Social People's Party
- List of newspapers in Liechtenstein
