= Gampriner Seele =

Lake in Liechtenstein

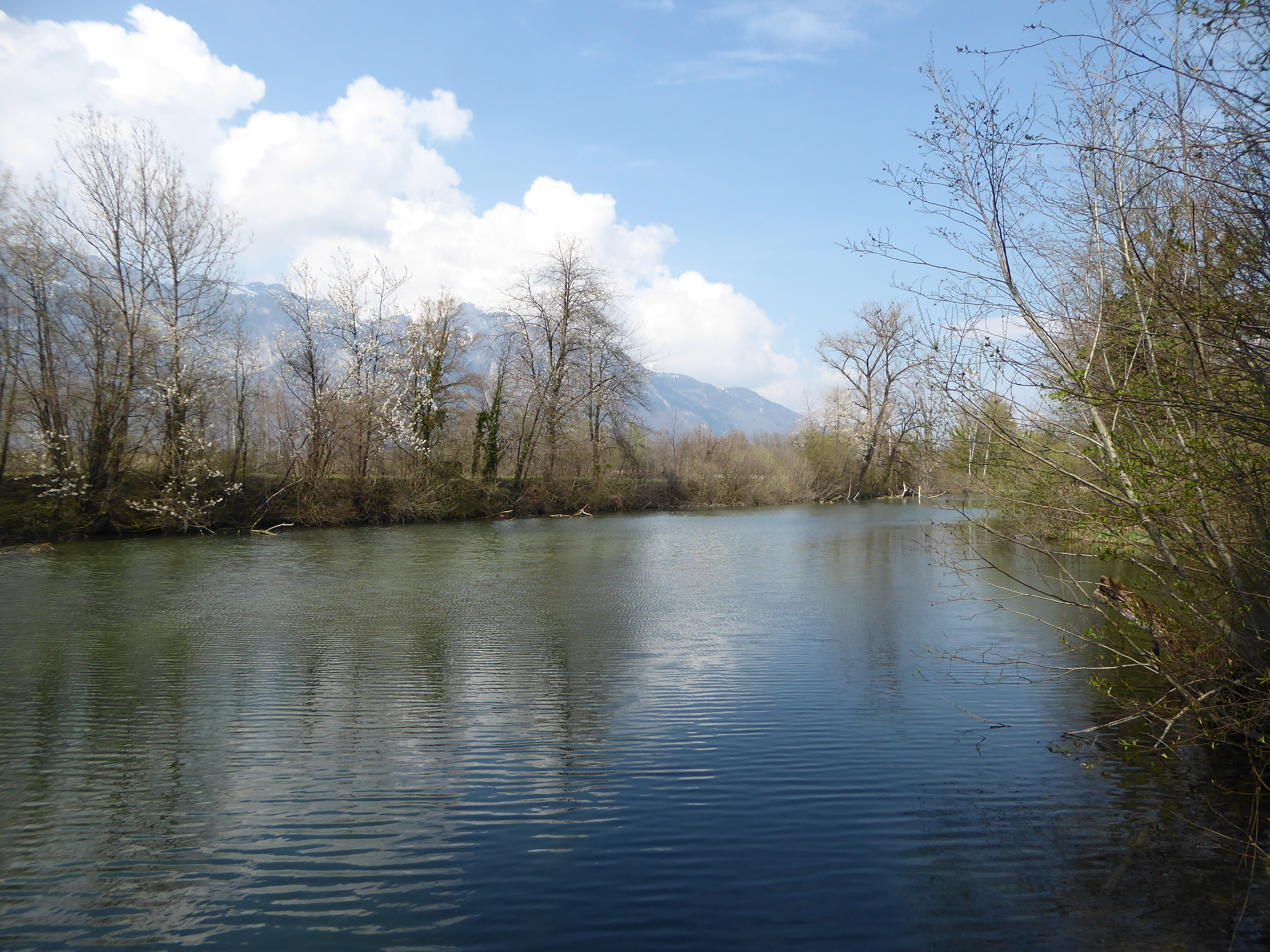

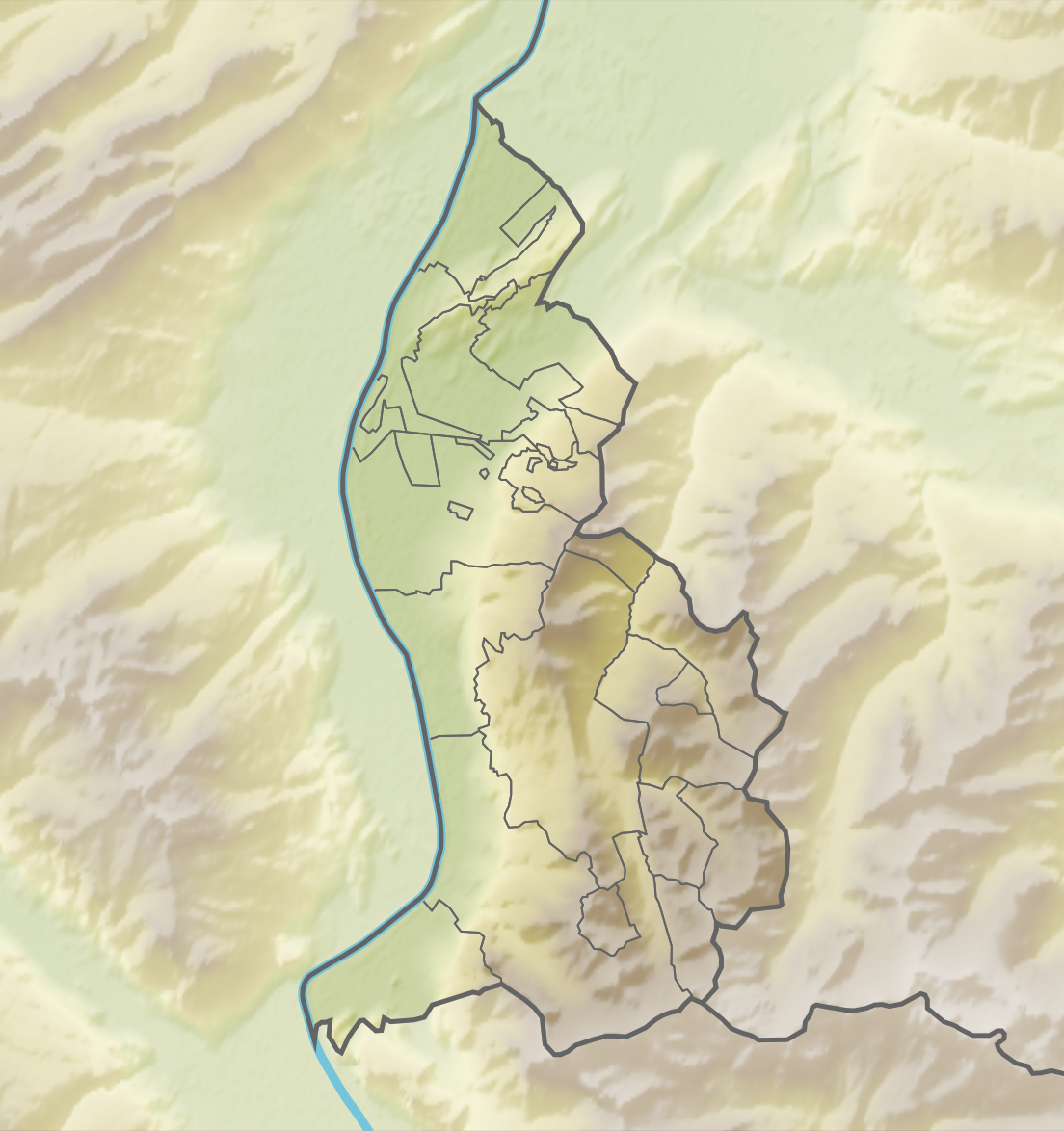
- Location within Liechtenstein
- Location: Gamprin, Liechtenstein
- Coordinates: 47°13′30″N 9°30′33″E
- Type: groundwater lake
- Primary inflows: Inland canal
- Basin countries: Liechtenstein
- Surface area: 2.6 ha (6.4 acres)
- Average depth: 3 m (9.8 ft)
- Max. depth: 6 m (20 ft)
- Water volume: 367,566.35 m^{3} (297.99089 acre⋅ft)
- Surface elevation: 435 m (1,427 ft)
- Settlements: Gamprin

Gampriner Seele or Gampriner Seelein is the only lake in Liechtenstein. It was created by a flood of the Rhine River with enormous erosion in 1927. The lake lies at 435 metres above sea level in the village of Bendern–Gamprin.

Gampriner Seele is surrounded by a dense deciduous forest which consists of plants such as reeds, hedges and trees. The treasure was put under nature conservation by the government in 1961. After elimination of the trash the water quality stabilized at B grade. A pipeline to the Liechtenstein inland canal provides the lake with fresh water and sufficient oxygen since 1979. The year after crayfish were settled in the lake.

Swans started breeding near the lake from the 1970s on. They were first seen in the principality in 1972 in the Sägaweiher in Nendeln. In the following years they started to populate the Gampriner Seele, too.

== Rare species in and around the lake ==
=== Plants ===
- Mare's tail (Hippuris vulgaris)
- Three-furrow duckweed (Lemna trisulca)

=== Animals ===
- Roach, rudd, crayfish
- Bleak, bream, pike
- Little grebe, moorhen, mallard, coot, mute swan
