= Anton Walser (politician) =

Liechtensteiner politician (1890–1948)

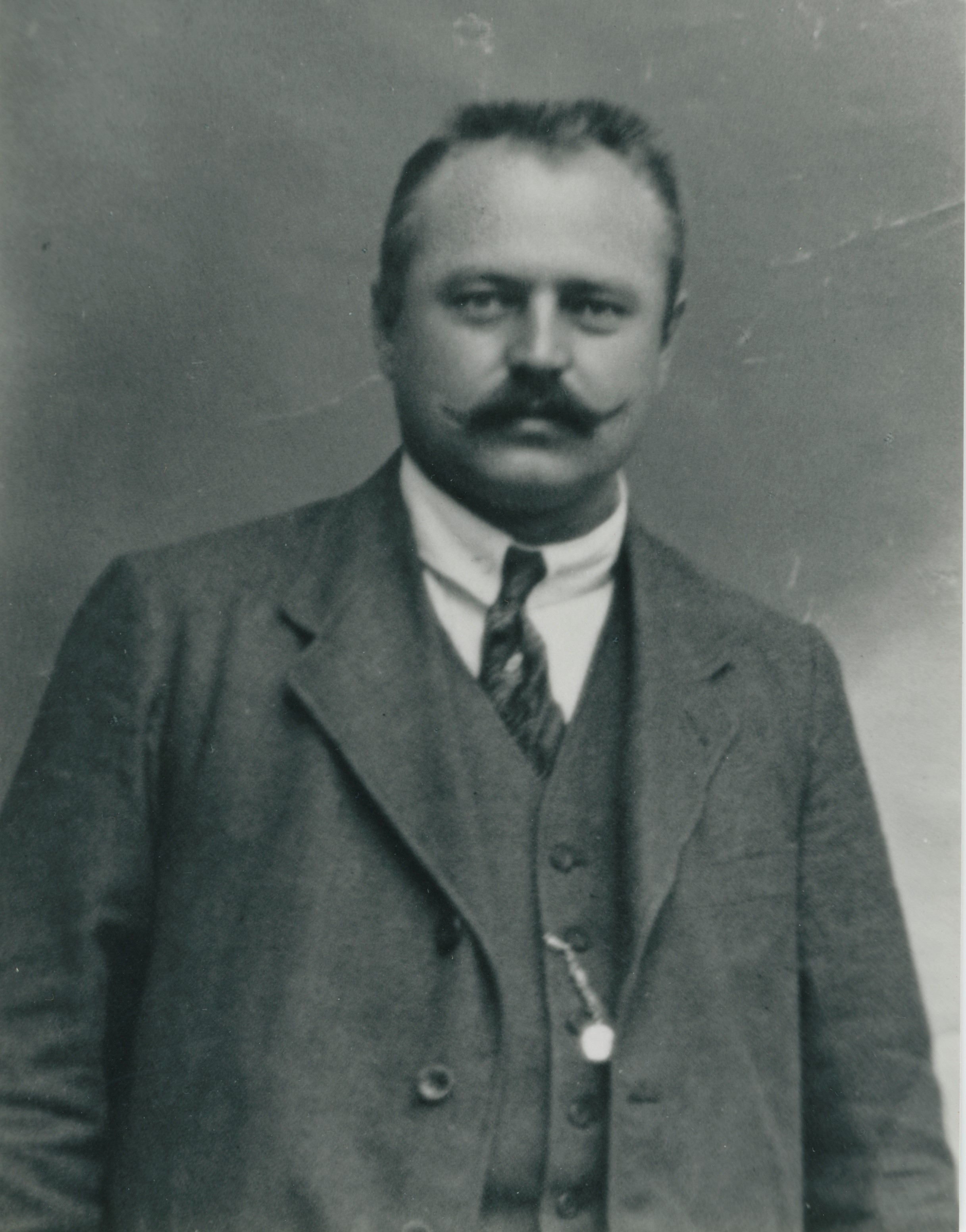

Member of the Landtag of Liechtenstein for Oberland
- In office 5 February 1922 – 9 June 1928

Personal details
- Born: 22 June 1890 Vaduz, Liechtenstein
- Died: 19 October 1948 (aged 58) Vaduz, Liechtenstein
- Party: Christian-Social People's Party
- Spouse: Alma Kirchthaler (m. 1918)
- Children: 5

Anton Kirchthaler Walser (22 June 1890 – 19 October 1948) was an industrialist and political figure from Liechtenstein who served in the Landtag of Liechtenstein. He was convicted of embezzlement in 1929.

== Early life ==
Walser was born on 22 June 1890 to the son of Anton Walser and Josefa Ospelt as one of five children. He attended state school in Vaduz. He initially worked as the princely state treasurer. Later, he worked as an insurance specialist and the innkeeper of a firm introduced to him by his wife. He also owned a leather goods factory in Vaduz.

In February 1918, Walser was a founding member of the Christian-Social People's Party and was the party's first chairman from 1918 to 1928. He was one of the most outspoken opponents of the appointment of Josef Peer as Governor of Liechtenstein in September 1920, as the party believed that the role should only be held by Liechtensteiners. Eventually it was agreed that Peer could take the position, but only for a 6-month period.

He was a member of the Landtag of Liechtenstein from 1922 to 1928. He was also the deputy mayor of Vaduz from 1924 to 1927 and a member of the state school board from 1922 to 1925. He was a member of the National Bank of Liechtenstein's control office from 1923 to 1927.

=== Embezzlement scandal and arrest ===
Starting from 1926, Walser, along with Franz Thöny, Niko Beck and Rudolf Carbone embezzled funds from the National Bank of Liechtenstein for various speculative transactions. This included the expansion of the class lottery in Liechtenstein and Romania, which was operated by Walser and had the legal representation of President of the Landtag of Liechtenstein Wilhelm Beck, who was also chairman of the bank's board of directors. The program promised high income and employment for Liechtenstein, though proved controversial within both the Landtag of Liechtenstein and the general population.

On 9 June 1928, he was expelled from the Landtag and subsequently arrested. In November 1929, Walser, who was primarily responsible, was sentenced to four years in prison. The scandal directly led to the forced resignation of the government of Gustav Schädler and early elections being called.

== Later life and personal life ==
After his release in 1933, Walser lived in France for several years before returning to live in Vaduz. He died there on 19 October 1948, aged 58 years old.

Walter married Alma Kirchthaler (24 September 1884 – 15 December 1951) on 8 June 1914; they had five children together.

== Bibliography ==
- Vogt, Paul (1987). 125 Jahre Landtag (in German). Vaduz: Landtag of the Principality of Liechtenstein.
