= 1930 Liechtenstein referendums =

Proportional representation for Landtag elections
For	39.36%
Against	60.64%

New media law passed by the Landtag
For	49.93%
Against	50.07%

Building an inland channel
For	70.46%
Against	29.54%

Three referendums were held in Liechtenstein during 1930. The first was held on 2 March 1930 on introducing a proportional representation system for Landtag elections, and was rejected by 60.6% of voters. The second was held on 26 October on a new media law passed by the Landtag, and rejected by just three votes. The third on 14 December concerned the building of an inland channel, and was approved by 70.5% of voters.

== Results ==
=== Introduction of proportional representation ===
Choice	Votes	%
For	805	39.4
Against	1,240	60.6
Invalid/blank votes	45	–
Total	2,090	100
Registered voters/turnout	2,309	90.5
Source: Nohlen & Stöver

=== New media law ===
Choice	Votes	%
For	1,005	49.9
Against	1,008	50.1
Invalid/blank votes	78	–
Total	2,091	100
Registered voters/turnout	2,348	89.1
Source: Nohlen & Stöver

=== Construction of an inland channel ===
Choice	Votes	%
For	1,469	70.5
Against	616	29.5
Invalid/blank votes	66	–
Total	2,151	100
Registered voters/turnout	2,356	91.3
Source: Nohlen & Stöver
