= 1925 Liechtenstein referendums =

Lawena power plant
For	56.13%
Against	43.87%

Gassner initiative
For	10.9%
Against	89.1%

Landtag counterproposal to the Gassner initiative
For	81.7%
Against	18.3%

Three referendums were held in Liechtenstein during 1925. The first on 13 September was on the subject of the Lawena power plant and was approved by 56.1% of voters. The second and third were held on 13 December and concerned two proposals on civil order, the Gassner Initiative and a counterproposal from the Landtag. The Landtag's proposal was approved by 81.7% of voters, whilst the Gassner Initiative was rejected by 89.1%.

== Results ==
=== Lawena power plant ===
Choice	Votes	%
For	957	56.1
Against	748	43.9
Invalid/blank votes	140	–
Total	1,845	100
Registered voters/turnout	2,167	85.1
Source: Nohlen & Stöver

=== Gassner Initiative ===
Choice	Votes	%
For	171	10.9
Against	1,400	89.1
Invalid/blank votes	155	–
Total	1,869	100
Registered voters/turnout	2,179	85.8
Source: Nohlen & Stöver^{[a]}

=== Landtag counterproposal on civil order ===
Choice	Votes	%
For	1,293	81.7
Against	290	18.3
Invalid/blank votes	155	–
Total	1,869	100
Registered voters/turnout	2,179	85.8
Source: Nohlen & Stöver^{[a]}

^{a} The official figures for the two referendums in December are inconsistent and do not add up to the totals given.
