= 1927 Liechtenstein flood =

Natural disaster in Liechtenstein

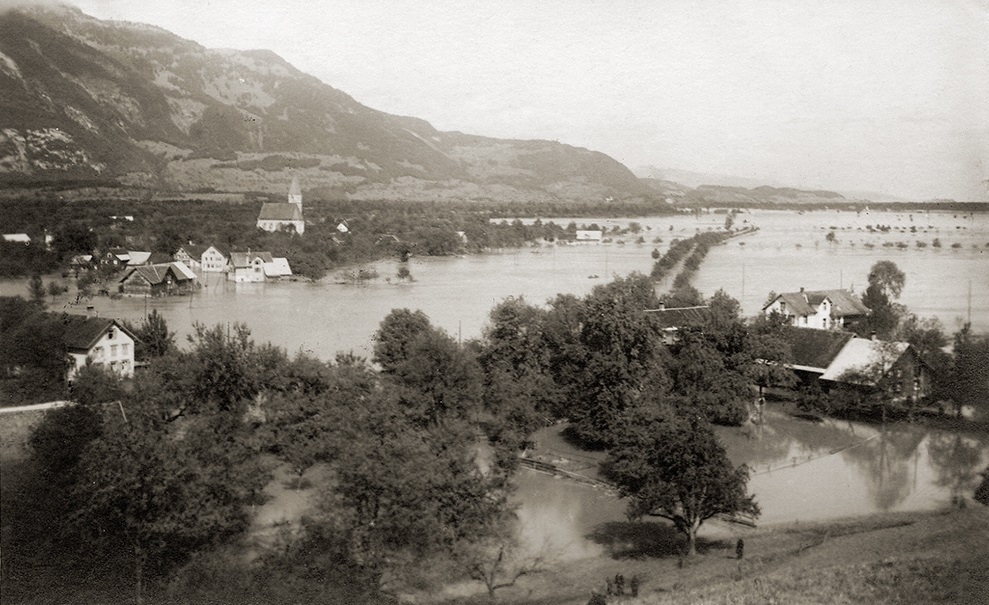
- Ruggell during the flood

Meteorological history
- Duration: 25 September 1927

Overall effects
- Fatalities: 2
- Areas affected: Liechtenstein, Austria

On 25 September 1927, the Alpine Rhine burst its banks upstream of Schaan, Liechtenstein. It destroyed large portions of the municipalities of Schaan, Gamprin and Ruggell, reaching as far as Tosters, Austria resulting in the deaths of two people and costing Liechtenstein 3.5 million Swiss francs in repairs. The event had devasting effects on Liechtenstein's economy, and severely set back its financial development.

The previous year, the Liechtenstein government had warned that the bridges along the Rhine were too low and that it posed a flood risk. The flood destroyed the Schaan Rhine railway bridge, along with large amounts of housing and farmland. Immediately following the flood, prime minister Gustav Schädler and president of the Landtag Wilhelm Beck sought aid from Switzerland, Germany, the Pope and American donors, securing a 1.5 million francs loan from Switzerland. In addition, Johann II, Prince of Liechtenstein donated an additional 1 million to support repairs.

Rescue efforts included operations from both the Swiss and Austrian militaries, and clean-up included international scouts. The Austrian Federal Railways rebuilt the Schaan railway bridge by November. The flood prompted the Liechtenstein government to work on raising the Rhine dykes and also lowering the river bed. In addition, it prompted the establishment of state savings and loan bank in Liechtenstein.

The flood created the Gampriner Seele, the only lake in Liechtenstein, which still exists today.

== Bibliography ==
- Geiger, Peter (1997). Liechtenstein in den Dreissigerjahren 1928–1939 [Liechtenstein in the 1930s 1928–1939] (in German). Vol. 1st. Zürich: Liechtenstein Institute. ISBN 3-906393-28-3.
