= Josef Gassner (politician, born 1876) =

Liechtensteiner politician (1876–1951)

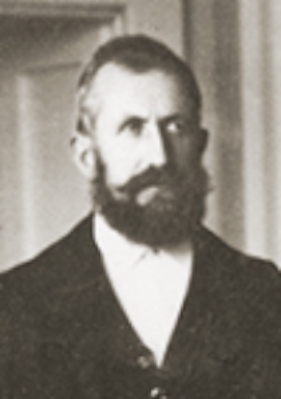
- Gassner in 1921

Member of the Landtag of Liechtenstein for Oberland
- In office 1917–1930
- In office 2 August 1910 – 2 October 1914

Mayor of Triesenberg
- In office 1915–1924
- Preceded by: Johann Beck
- Succeeded by: Alois Schädler

Personal details
- Born: 12 April 1876 Triesenberg, Liechtenstein
- Died: 15 January 1951 (aged 74) Triesenberg, Liechtenstein
- Party: Christian-Social People's Party
- Spouse(s): Katharina Beck (m. 1900; died 1923) Katharina Beck (m. 1937)
- Children: 8
- Parent(s): Josef Gassner; Maria Anna Bühler

Josef Gassner (12 April 1876 – 15 January 1951) was a farmer and politician from Liechtenstein who served in the Landtag of Liechtenstein from 1910 to 1914 and again from 1917 to 1930. He also served as mayor of Triesenberg from 1915 to 1924.

== Life ==
Gassner was born on 12 April 1876 in Triesenberg as the son of the then-mayor of Triesenberg Josef Gassner and Maria Anna (née Bühler) as one of two children. He worked as a farmer.

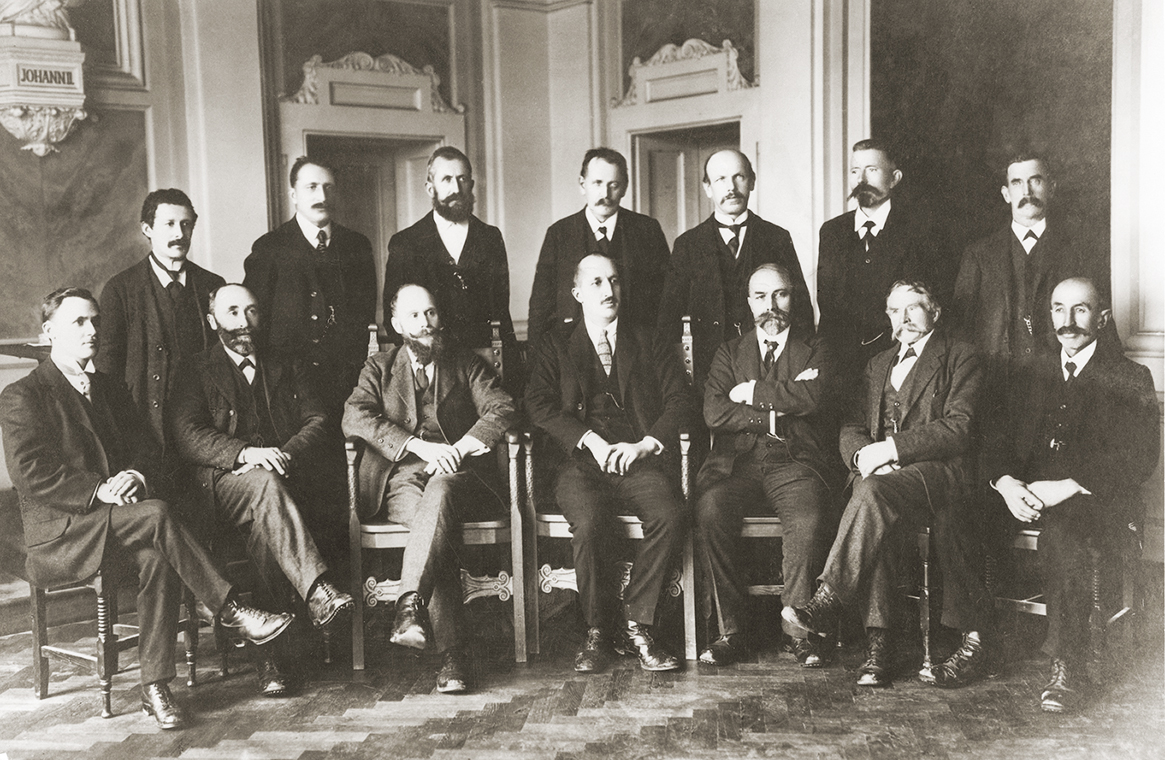
Gassner (third from left on the back) with members of the Landtag, 1921.

He was a school councillor in Triesenberg from 1906 to 1942. From 1906 to 1912 he was a community treasurer in the municipality. He was the mayor of Triesenberg from 1915 to 1924.

From 1910 to 1914 and again from 1917 to 1930 he served as a member of the Landtag of Liechtenstein, later as a member of the Christian-Social People's Party (VP); he was a deputy member of the Landtag from 1914 to 1917. During this time, Gassner wrote contracts, wills and petitions to the government for many people and provided information in legal matters regarding Triesenberg.

In the 1928 elections, Gassner was the only incumbent VP Landtag member to be re-elected. Along with the other VP members of the Landtag, Gassner resigned in 1930 due to disagreements with the Progressive Citizens' Party (FBP) regarding the length of the mandate following the 1928 elections. He unsuccessfully sought re-election to the Landtag in the 1932 elections.

From 1922 to 1927 he was president and from 1927 to 1930 vice president of the board of directors at the Lawena power plant in Triesenberg, which he had advocated for its building. He was the chairman of the VP from 1929 to 1931 and became an honorary member from 1931. He was a member of the state tax commission from 1935 to 1939.

Gassner married Katharina Beck (7 January 1878 – 9 August 1923) on 5 February 1900 and they had six children together. He then went on to marry Katharina Beck (8 June 1899 – 20 March 1993) on 3 June 1937 and they had another two children together. He died of a serious illness on 15 January 1951, aged 74.

== Honours ==
- Liechtenstein: Commemorative Medal for the Golden Jubilee of HSH Prince Johan II.

== Bibliography ==
- Vogt, Paul (1987). 125 Jahre Landtag (in German). Vaduz: Landtag of the Principality of Liechtenstein.
- Geiger, Peter (1997). Liechtenstein in den Dreissigerjahren 1928–1939 [Liechtenstein in the 1930s 1928–1939] (in German). Vol. 1. Zürich: Liechtenstein Institute. ISBN 3-906393-28-3.
