= Tosters, Austria =

District of Feldkirch, Vorarlberg, Austria

Coordinates: 47.2330°N 9.5667°E

Tosters
- City district
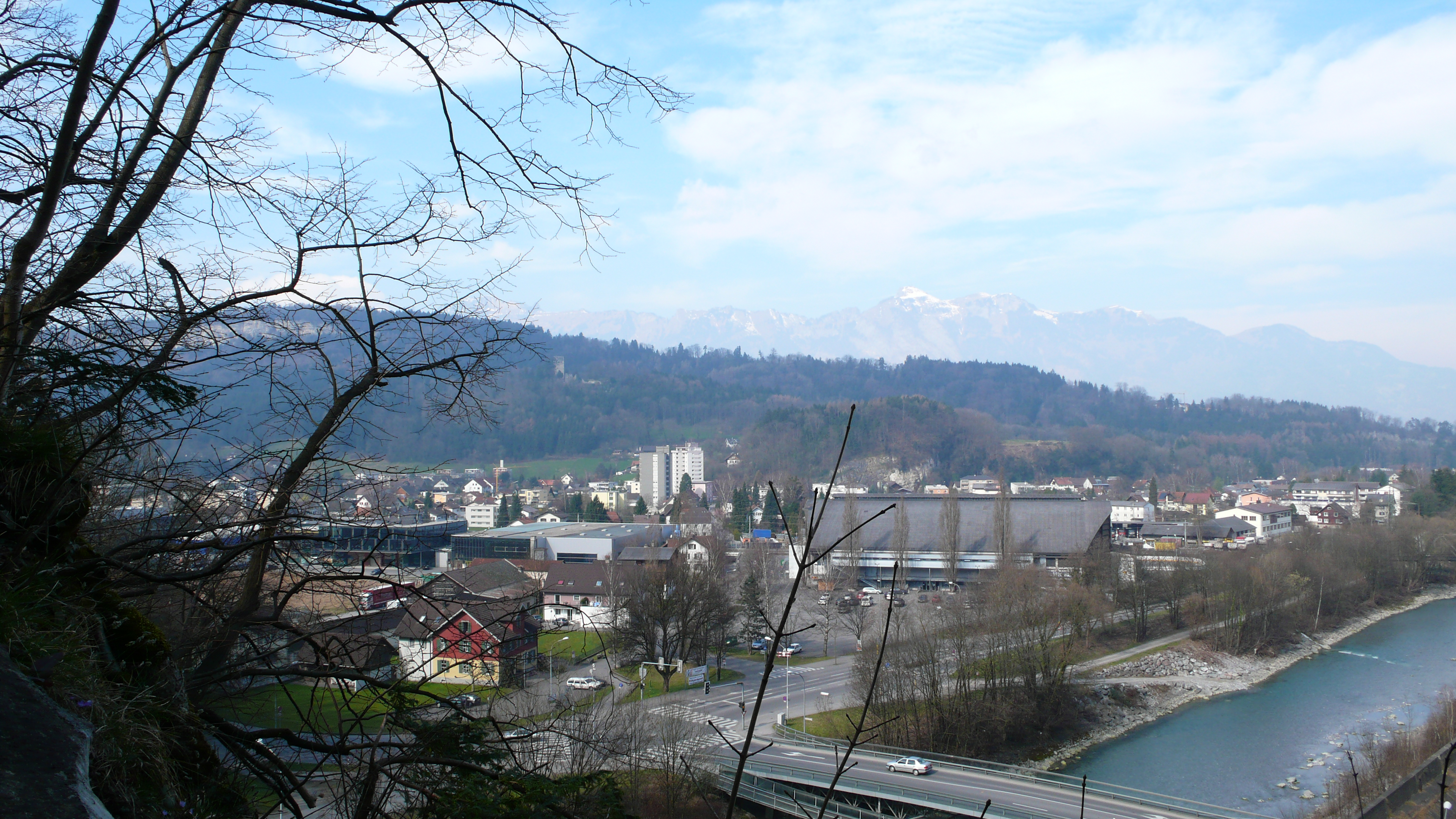

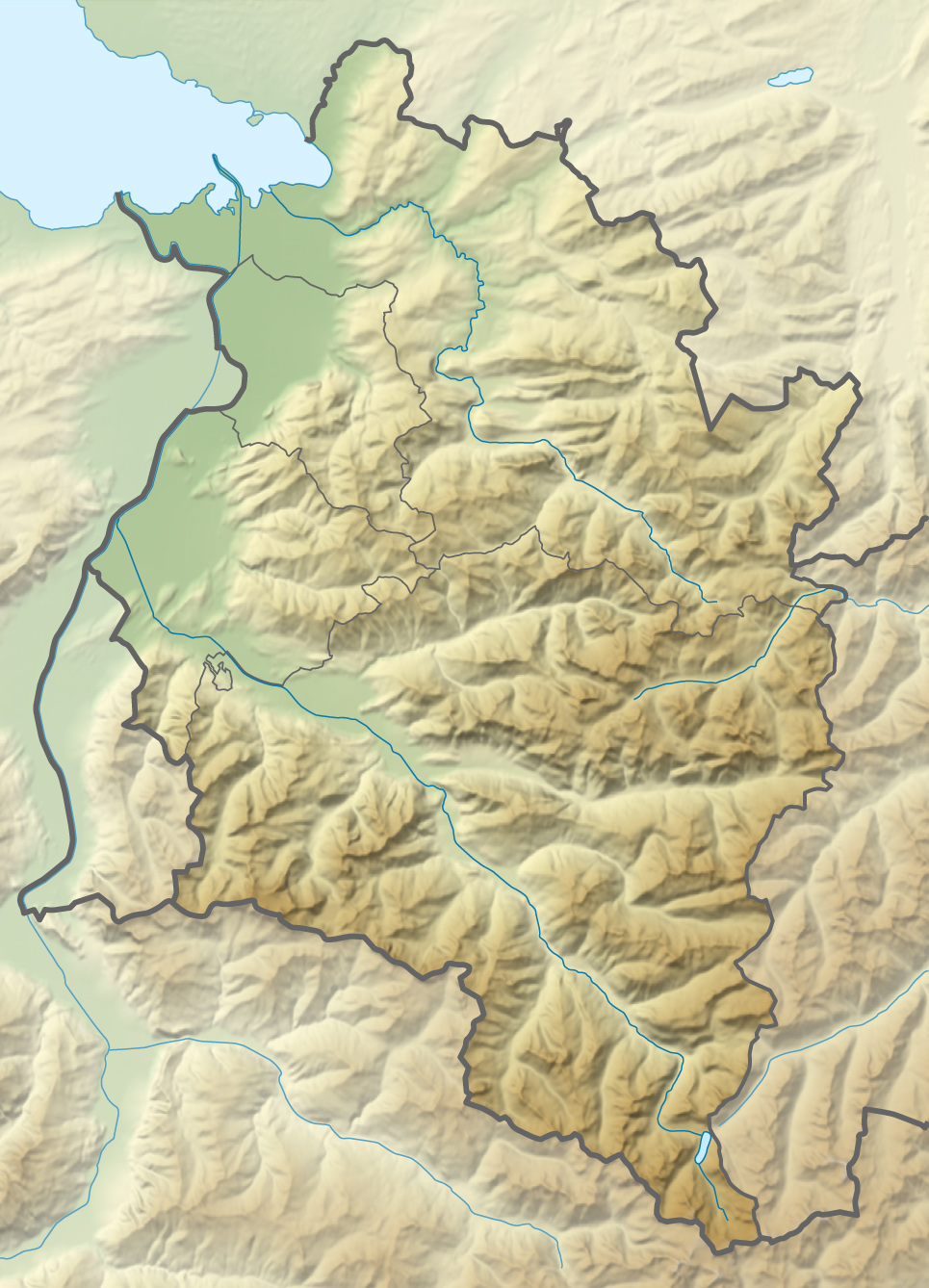
- Location within Vorarlberg Location within Austria
- Country: Austria
- State: Vorarlberg
- District: Feldkirch
- Time zone: UTC+1 (CET)
  - Summer (DST): UTC+2 (CEST)
- Postal code: 6800

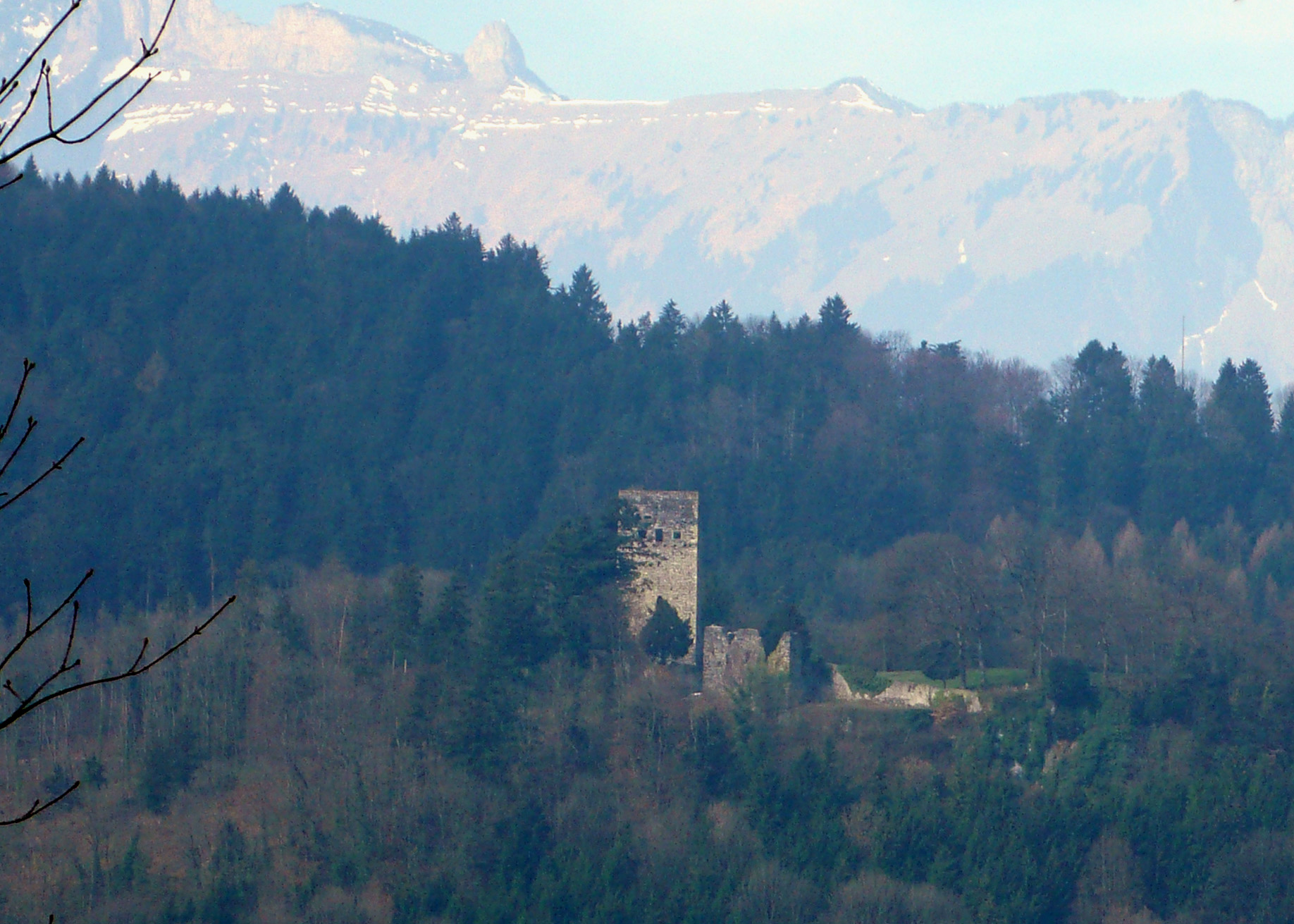
Ruins of fortress

Tosters is a district of Feldkirch, a city in the westernmost Austrian state of Vorarlberg. Other districts of Feldkirch are Altenstadt, Gisingen, Levis, Nofels and Tisis.

The district has a population of 5381 people (as of 30 June 2009) and an area of 4.05 km^{2} (1.56 sq mi).

It is located on the Ill river. A popular nearby landmark is the fortress ruin Tosters.

== See also ==
- List of cities and towns in Austria
