= Peter Büchel (politician, born 1872) =

Liechtensteiner farmer and politician (1872–1958)

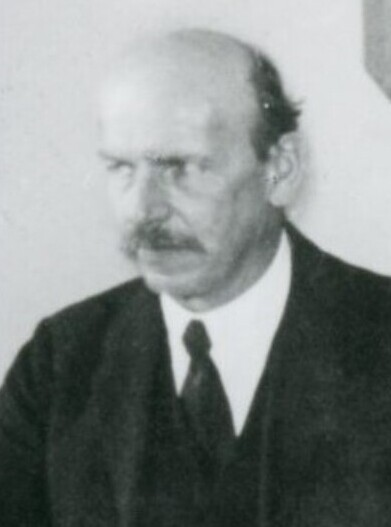
- Büchel in 1928

Liechtenstein government councillor
- In office 30 September 1926 – 30 March 1938
- Prime Minister: Gustav Schädler; Josef Hoop
- Preceded by: Josef Steger
- Succeeded by: Anton Frommelt

Member of the Landtag of Liechtenstein for Unterland
- In office 18 March 1918 – 4 April 1939

Personal details
- Born: 29 June 1872 Mauren, Liechtenstein
- Died: 24 April 1958 (aged 85) Mauren, Liechtenstein
- Party: Progressive Citizens' Party
- Spouse: Maria Paulina Kaiser (m. 1907)
- Relations: Johann Anton Büchel (brother); Jakob Kaiser (father-in-law)
- Children: 2, including Alfons

Peter Büchel (29 June 1872 – 24 April 1958) was a farmer and politician Liechtenstein who served in the Landtag of Liechtenstein from 1918 to 1939. A member of the Progressive Citizens' Party (FBP), he also served as a government councillor from 1926 to 1938. Considered an agrarian-conservative, Büchel was a prominent farmer's representative in government.

== Life ==
Büchel was born on 29 June 1872 as the son of Kaspar Büchel and Josefa (née Öhri) as one of eleven children. He worked as a farmer.

He was a member of the Mauren municipal council from 1903 to 1906, and the municipalities mediator from 1912 to 1922. He was elected as a deputy member of the Landtag of Liechtenstein in the 1914 elections, and then as a full member in 1918 as a member of the Progressive Citizens' Party (FBP), a position he would serve until 1939. During this time, Büchel was an FBP delegate to the castle agreements in 1920 and a member of the constitutional commission aimed at the revision of the constitution of Liechtenstein. Büchel was considered the "leader of the opposition" in the Landtag from 1922 to 1926; he was Vice president of the Landtag from 1922 to 1923.

Büchel was appointed as a government councillor on 30 September 1926, under the government of Gustav Schädler of the Christian-Social People's Party (VP). In June 1928, when Schädler's government was forced to resign as a result an embezzlement scandal involving the National Bank of Liechtenstein, the VP accused Büchel of being complicit in the scandal, but he was acquitted of all charges following an investigation that he requested.

Büchel continued his position under the government of Josef Hoop. In government, he was considered a farmer's representative and advocated for the construction of the Liechtenstein inland canal to create jobs. He opposed the introduction of proportional representation in Liechtenstein and also the FBP forming a coalition government with the Patriotic Union in 1938, but nevertheless resigned on 30 March with the rest of government to maintain party peace.

Described as an agrarian-conservative, Büchel was an opponent of Nazi elements in Liechtenstein; he was a member of the Liechtenstein Loyalty Association, a nonpartisan organization designed to oppose the German National Movement in Liechtenstein.

== Personal life ==
Büchel married Maria Paulina Kaiser (29 January 1881 – 5 June 1966), the daughter of Jakob Kaiser, on 12 May 1907; they had two children. His son Alfons also served in the Landtag.

He died unexpectedly on 24 April 1958, aged 85.

== Honours ==
- Liechtenstein:
  - (Liechtenstein) Commemorative Medal for the Golden Jubilee of HSH Prince Johan II (1920)
  - Grand Cross of the Order of Merit of the Principality of Liechtenstein (1937)

== Bibliography ==
- Vogt, Paul (1987). 125 Jahre Landtag (in German). Vaduz: Landtag of the Principality of Liechtenstein.
