= Wilhelm Büchel =

Liechtensteiner farmer (1873–1951)

Wilhelm Büchel (16 December 1873 in Gamprin – 10 August 1951) was a Liechtensteiner farmer and politician (FBP).

Büchel worked as a farmer in Gamprin. He served as a municipal councillor from 1909 to 1915, as municipal treasurer from 1915 to 1921, and finally as municipal leader of Gamprin from 1921 to 1930. From 1926 to 1932 he was a member of the Landtag of Liechtenstein for the Progressive Citizens' Party (FBP).

Büchel married Maria Wohlwend and had eight children. His son Ernst worked as a lawyer and later also became a member of parliament for the FBP.
