= Ludwig Marxer =

Deputy Prime Minister of Liechtenstein from 1928 to 1933

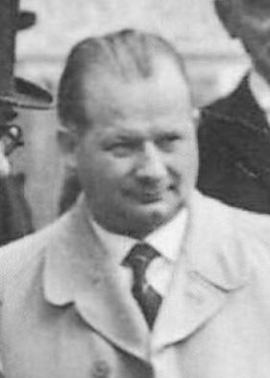
- Marxer in 1938

Deputy Prime Minister of Liechtenstein
- In office 4 August 1928 – 20 June 1933
- Monarchs: Johann II; Franz I
- Prime Minister: Josef Hoop
- Preceded by: Alfons Feger
- Succeeded by: Anton Frommelt

Personal details
- Born: 27 April 1897 Eschen, Liechtenstein
- Died: 20 February 1962 (aged 64) Vaduz, Liechtenstein
- Party: Progressive Citizens' Party
- Spouse: Maria nee Öhri (m. 1932)
- Children: 3, including Peter Marxer
- Parent(s): Ludwig Marxer; Maria Anna Öhri
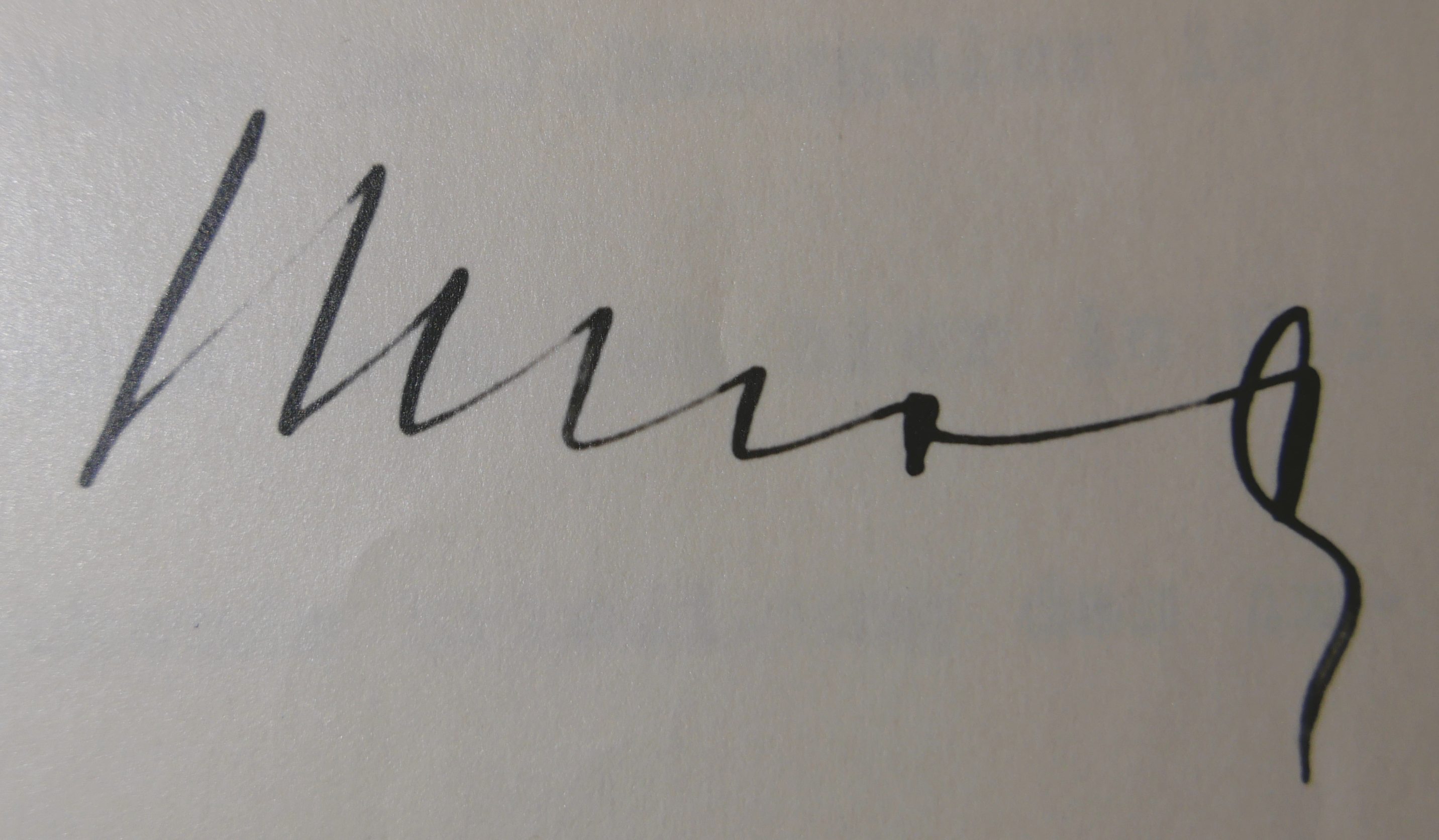
- Signature

Ludwig Marxer (27 April 1897 – 20 February 1962) was a lawyer and politician from Liechtenstein who served as the Deputy Prime Minister of Liechtenstein from 1928 to 1933, under the government of Josef Hoop.

== Early life ==
Marxer was born on 27 April 1897 in Eschen as one of eight children. His father by the same name was mayor of Eschen until 1898, when he and his family moved to Vaduz. Marxer attended high school in Feldkirch and then studied law and political science at the University of Innsbruck from 1922 to 1924.

== Career ==
He founded his own law firm Marxer & Partner Rechtsanwälte in 1925, and as of 2023 this the largest law firm in Liechtenstein.

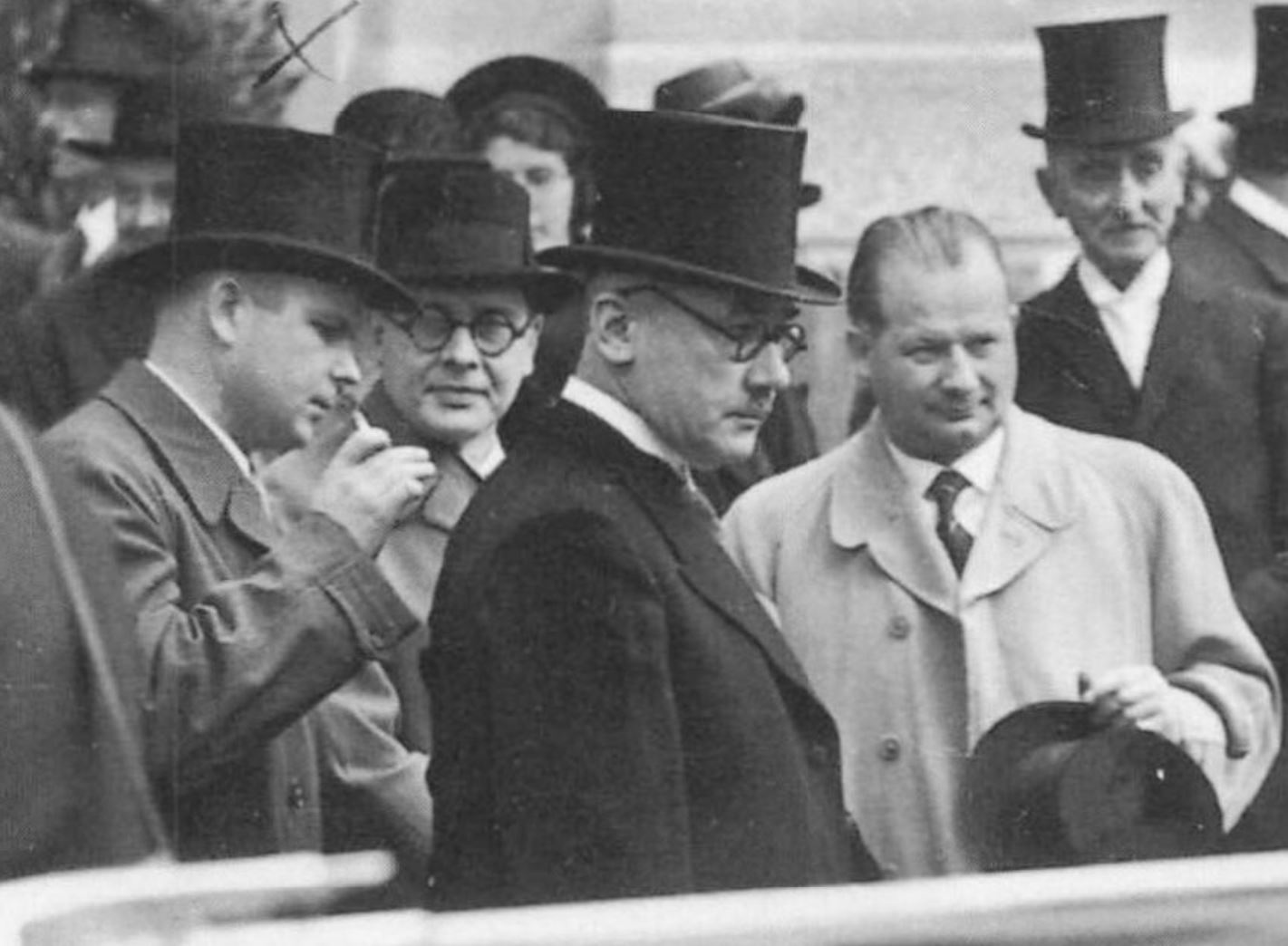
Marxer (right) with Alois Vogt, Otto Schaedler and Josef Hoop, around 1938.

Marxer entered politics as a member of the Progressive Citizens' Party and was briefly the president of the party. Following the January 1926 Liechtenstein general election a government crisis started as the governing Christian-Social People's Party refused to elect Marxer to government, which resulted in early elections being called and his resignation as party president.

Marxer had a friendship with Josef Hoop and was appointed to serve Deputy Prime Minister of Liechtenstein on 4 August 1928. He resigned this position in 1933 due to his desire to focus on his law practice and was succeeded by Anton Frommelt. He remained a government advisor to Hoop for the rest of his premiership and officially resigned all government positions upon Hoop's resignation in 1945.

A number of his clients and business partners were Jewish, including Alfred and Fritz Rotter, which made him a target of attacks by the German National Movement in Liechtenstein (VBDL). On 16 June 1940 his house was the subject of a bombing attack. From 1937 he served in the Princely judicial council then in the Staatsgerichtshof from 1960.

== Personal life ==
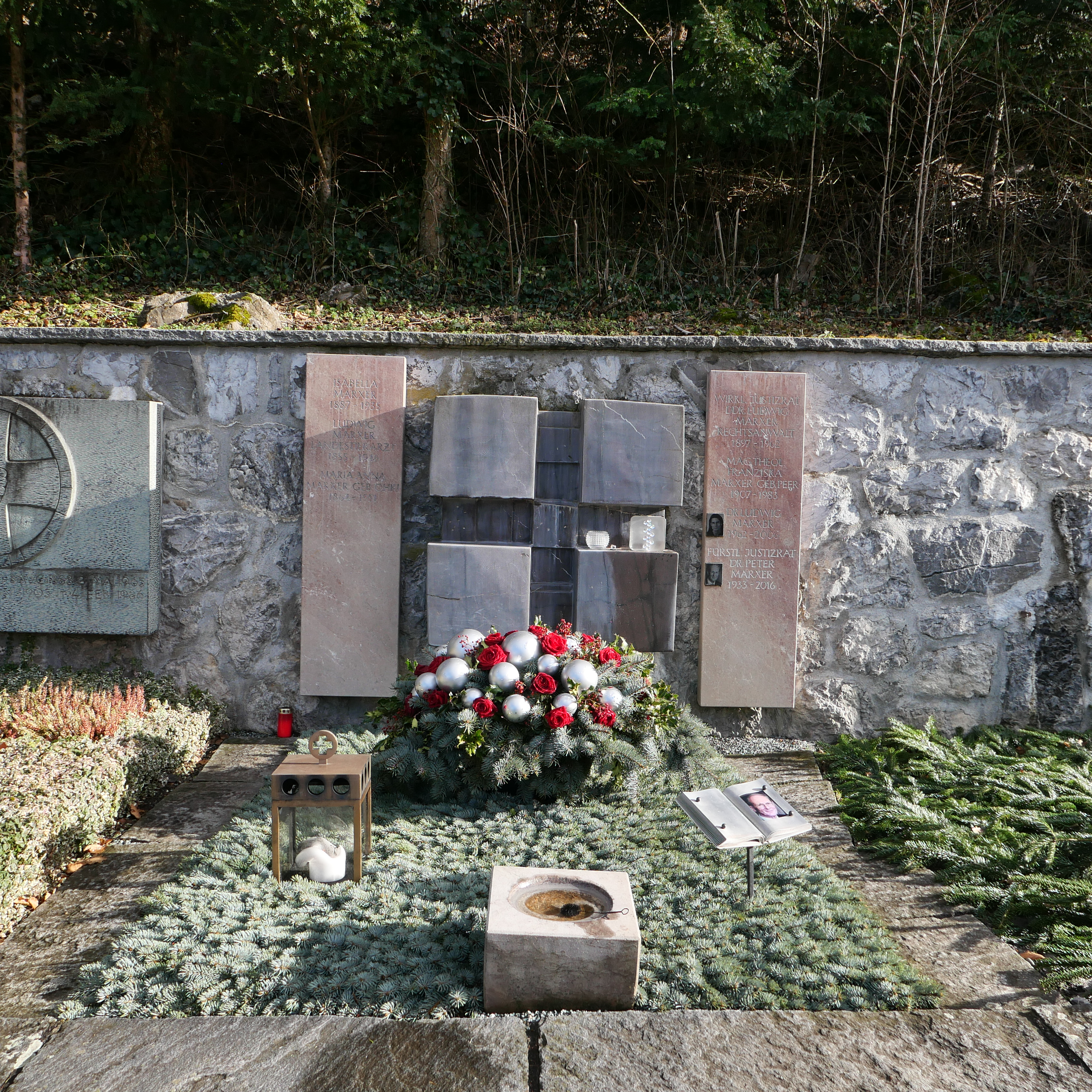
The family grave in 2024.

Marxer married Franziska Peer (1907–1983), the daughter of Josef Peer, on 27 July 1932 and they had three children, including Peter Marxer who took over his law firm and was also a politician in the Progressive Citizens' Party. Due to helping Ludwig with his law firm, Franziska was granted a license in 1937 to act as a "legal agent" to represent parties in civil and criminal matters. In 1966, Ludwig's daughter Marianne Marxer became the first female lawyer to work for Liechtenstein's state administration.

Marxer died of a stroke on 20 February 1962 at the age of 64 years old.He found his final resting place at the Vaduz cemetery next to his parents and his older sister Isabella (1887-1935). His wife, his son Peter and Peter's son Ludwig (1962-2006), who also became a lawyer and crime writer, were later buried in the family grave as well.
