= Christian-Social People's Party (Liechtenstein) =

Political party in Liechtenstein between 1918 and 1936

Christian-Social People's Party Christlich-Soziale Volkspartei
- Abbreviation: VP
- Founder: Wilhelm Beck
- Founded: February 1918; 108 years ago
- Dissolved: 5 January 1936; 90 years ago
- Merged into: Patriotic Union
- Newspaper: Liechtensteiner Nachrichten (Liechtenstein News)
- Ideology: Social liberalism Christian democracy
- Political position: Centre
- Colours: Red

The Christian-Social People's Party (German: Christlich-Soziale Volkspartei, CSV), often shortened to simply the People's Party (German: Volkspartei, VP), was a social liberal political party in Liechtenstein. It tended to be more popular in the Oberland, and supported closer ties with Switzerland as opposed to Austria. Founded in 1918, the Christian-Social People's Party and the Progressive Citizens' Party (FBP) were the first political parties in Liechtenstein. In 1936, it merged with the Liechtenstein Homeland Service to form the Patriotic Union.

== History ==
=== Formation and putsch ===
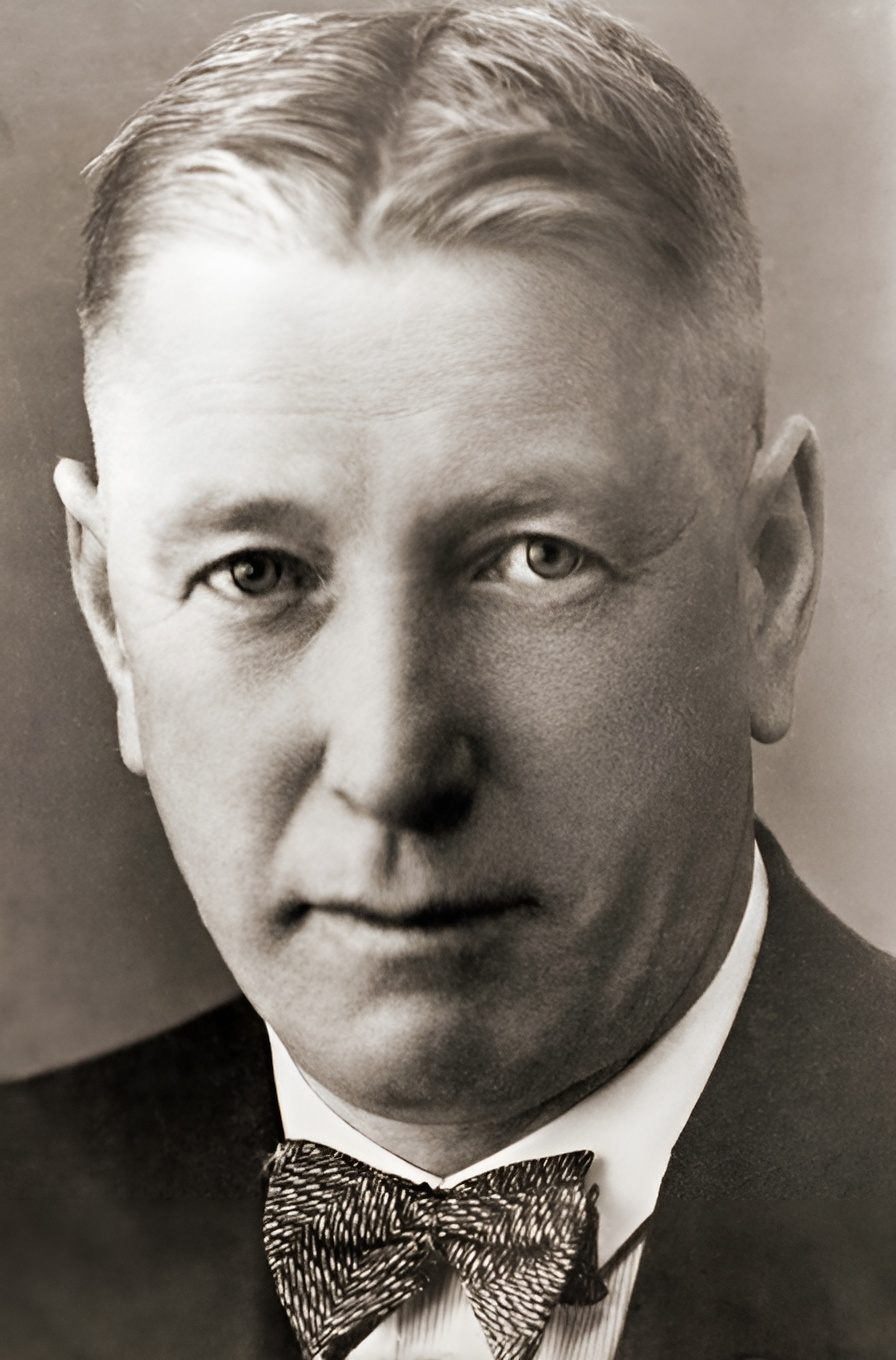
Wilhelm Beck

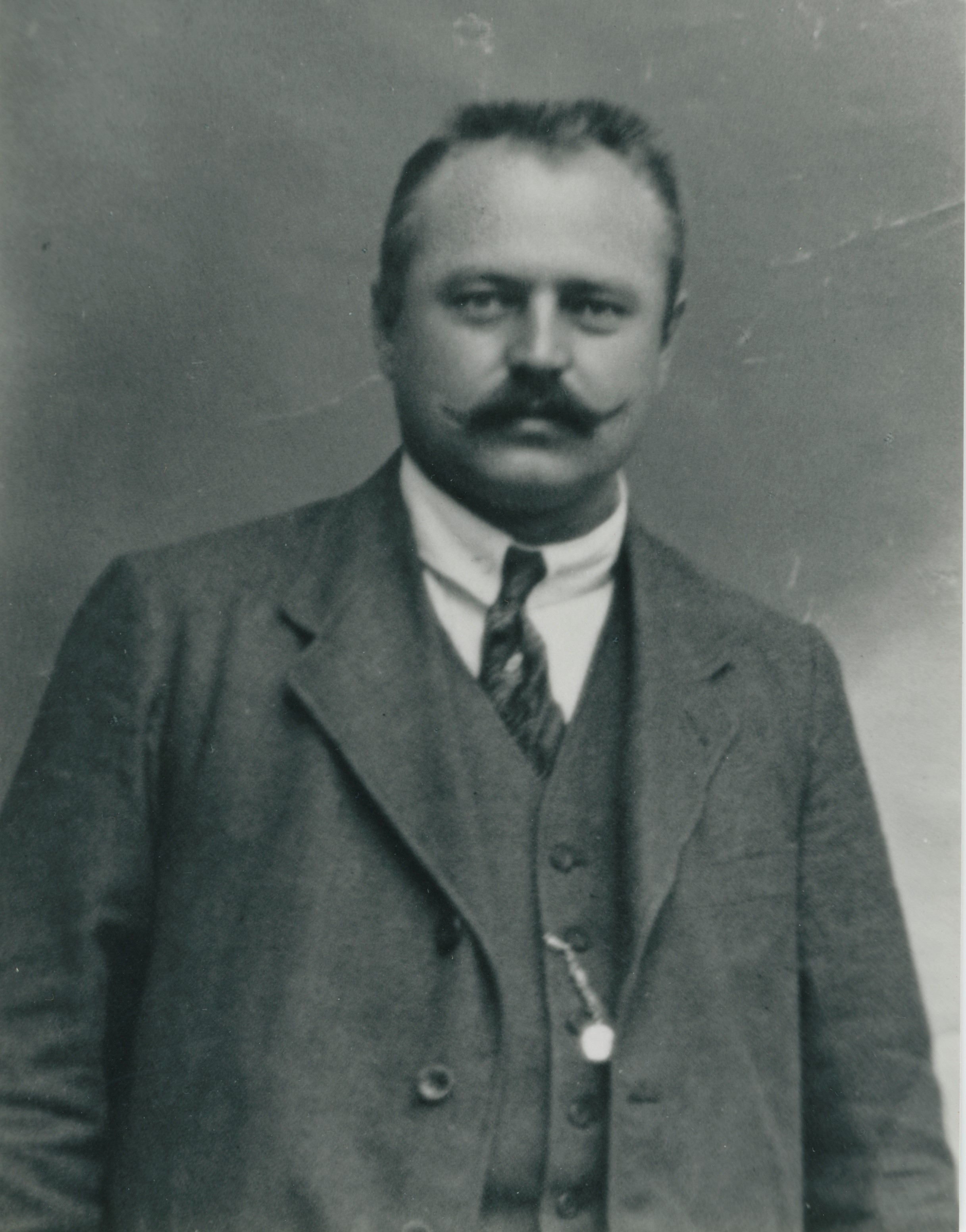
Anton Walser

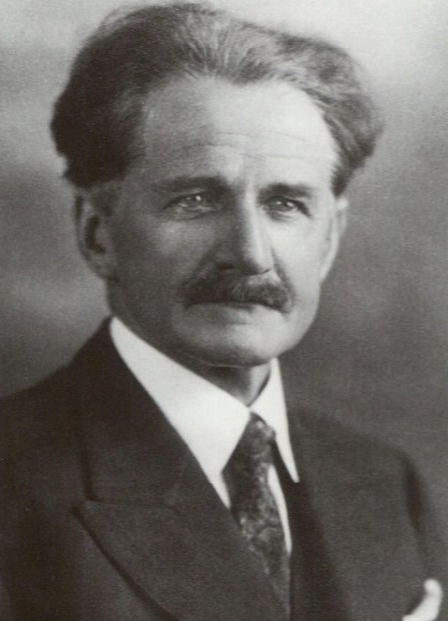
Martin Ritter

The party's roots originate behind the ideals of lawyer and politician Wilhelm Beck when he formed an opposition group around himself in 1914 with its newspaper Oberrheinische Nachrichten against the government of governor Leopold Freiherr von Imhof. The party itself was established in February 1918 as an off-shoot of the trade union movement. In the 1918 Liechtenstein general election, the first it contested, it won 5 out of 12 of the seats in the Landtag of Liechtenstein.

The party was primarily responsible for the 1918 Liechtenstein putsch, where on 7 November 1918 Beck, Fritz Walser and Martin Ritter proposed a motion of no confidence against Imhof in the Landtag and it transferred the power of the governor to a Provisional Executive Committee, led by Ritter as the first Liechtensteiner head of government. The action was against the constitution, as the prince had the sole authority to appoint or dismiss government officials. However, the coup was popular among the population and ultimately Johann II acknowledged the formation of the committee and accepted Imhof's resignation. The committee was in power until 7 December 1918 when Prince Karl Aloys of Liechtenstein was appointed governor.

=== Political history and ideology ===
The VP advocated for an expansion of democracy and progressive social policies, and was also supportive of the country's constitutional monarchy. It also supported political realignment towards Switzerland as opposed to Austria. Due to its pro-democratic social liberal leanings and party colours, party members were often referred to disparagingly as "Reds".

The party formed its first and only government following the 1922 elections under Gustav Schädler as prime minister with Beck as President of the Landtag of Liechtenstein and remained in power until 1928. The party lost significant credibility when his government was the subject of an embezzlement scandal involving the National Bank of Liechtenstein in 1928, primarily by party chairman Anton Walser. Johann II forced his government to resign in June 1928 as a result, and early elections were called. In the subsequent 1928 general election, the VP lost by a significant margin, but maintained a seat in government.

In 1930, all four Landtag members belonging to the VP resigned as they argued that the term of government established in the 1928 elections was not a new mandate but a continuation of the one established in 1926. In the subsequent 1930 by-election, the Progressive Citizens' Party won all four seats, as the VP did not participate, leading them to have an absolute majority in the Landtag until 1932.

In 1935, the VP formed an alliance with the Liechtenstein Homeland Service (LHD), which was referred to as the 'National Opposition'. This alliance pushed through an initiative to introduce proportional representation to the country. However, the subsequent 1935 Liechtenstein electoral system referendum was narrowly rejected by voters. Motivated by a desire to unite the opposition prior to the 1936 Liechtenstein general election, the VP and LHD merged on 1 January 1936 to form the Patriotic Union. In addition, the respective party newspapers merged to form the Liechtensteiner Vaterland.

== Electoral performance ==
Election	Leader	Performance		Rank	Government
Election	Leader	Seats	+/–	Rank	Government
1918	Wilhelm Beck	5 / 15	New	2nd	Opposition
1922	Gustav Schädler	11 / 15	▲6	▲1st	Majority
1926 (Jan)	Gustav Schädler	9 / 15	▼2	1st	Majority
1926 (Apr)	Gustav Schädler	9 / 15	0	1st	Majority
1928	Gustav Schädler	4 / 15	▼5	▼2nd	Opposition
1930	Wilhelm Beck	0 / 15	▼4	2nd	Extra-parliamentary
1932	Wilhelm Beck	2 / 15	▲2	2nd	Opposition

== Bibliography ==
- Nohlen, Dieter; Stöver, Philip (2010). Elections in Europe: A data handbook. Nomos. ISBN 978-3-8329-5609-7.
- Vogt, Paul (1987). 125 Jahre Landtag (in German). Vaduz: Landtag of the Principality of Liechtenstein.
