= Dieter Nohlen =

German academic and political scientist

- Born: 6 November 1939 (age 87); Oberhausen, Gau Essen, Germany
- Education: Heidelberg University
- Occupation: Political scientist
- Awards: Max Planck Research Prize (1991); Das politische Buch (1995); Augsburg University Prize for Spanish, Portuguese and Latin American Studies (2000)

Dieter Nohlen (born 6 November 1939) is a German academic and political scientist. He currently holds the position of Emeritus Professor of Political Science in the Faculty of Economic and Social Sciences of the University of Heidelberg. An expert on electoral systems and political development, he has published several books.

== Bibliography ==
Books published by Nohlen include:

- Electoral systems of the world (in German, 1978)
- Lexicon of politics (seven volumes)
- Elections and Electoral Systems (1996)
- Elections in Africa: A Data Handbook (1999 with Michael Krennerich and Bernhard Thibaut)
- Elections in Asia and the Pacific: A Data Handbook (2001 with Florian Grotz and Christof Hartmann)
  - Volume 2: South East Asia, East Asia, and the Pacific (2002), ISBN 0199249598
- Voter Turnout Since 1945: A Global Report (2002 with Bengt Save-Soderbergh)
- Electoral law and party systems (2004)
- Electoral systems and party politics (2004)
- Elections in the Americas: A Data Handbook (2005)
- Elections in Europe: A Data Handbook (2010 with Philip Stoever)
