= National Bank of Liechtenstein =

Central Bank of Liechtenstein

Coordinates: 47°8′17″N 9°31′19″E

Liechtensteinische Landesbank AG
- Trade name: LLB
- Type: Aktiengesellschaft
- Traded as: SIX: LLBN
- Industry: Banking
- Founded: 1861; 165 years ago
- Headquarters: Vaduz, Liechtenstein
- Area served: Austria, Liechtenstein, Switzerland, Germany, Dubai and Abu Dhabi
- Net income: CHF 167,200,000 (2024)
- Total assets: CHF 97,000,000,000 (2024)
- Total equity: CHF 2,200,000,000 (2024)
- Number of employees: 1286 (2024)
- Subsidiaries: Liechtensteinische Landesbank (Österreich) AG; LLB (Schweiz) AG
- Website: www.llb.li

Liechtensteinische Landesbank AG, trading as LLB (stylised as llb), is a financial institution located in Liechtenstein, based in the capital city Vaduz. Since 1993 it has been listed as a company at the SIX Swiss Exchange, with the majority of shares (56.3%) owned by the Liechtenstein state. As the state is in a customs and monetary union with Switzerland and has adopted the Swiss franc as official currency, the monetary policy and money supply is the sole responsibility of the Swiss National Bank (SNB).

The LLB Group offers its clients wealth management services: as a universal bank, in private banking, asset management and fund services. With over a thousand employees, it is present in Liechtenstein, Switzerland, Austria, the United Arab Emirates and, since 2024, in Germany. As at 31 December 2024, the business volume of the LLB Group was 113.5 billion Swiss francs.

In addition to its primary operations in Liechtenstein, LLB also operates in Austria and Switzerland, Germany, Dubai and Abu Dhabi.

== History ==
In 1992 Liechtenstein joined the European Economic Area which made the bank fear for its country's bank secrecy policy.

In 1993, the Liechtensteinische Landesbank was listed in the Swiss Stock Exchange, with the majority of shares (57.5%) owned by the Liechtenstein state.

In February 2007, the Liechtensteinische Landesbank became a controlling shareholder of the Banque Linth.

== Tasks ==
Due to Liechtenstein's signed valuta union agreement with Switzerland and its adoption of the Swiss franc as its official currency, the Swiss National Bank performs most duties in administration of macro finance, currency and credit of banks. The National Bank of Liechtenstein however is responsible for the following three tasks:

1. "To be secretariat for the Government in the administration of macro finance, currency, credit of Banks within the country."
2. "To promote and maintain stability of price within the country; strengthen the efficiency of payments mechanism."
3. "To promote and facilitate control on the flows of money to serve the socio-economic development plan of the Liechtenstein."

== CEOs ==
- 1928–1967: Eduard Batliner
- 1967–1971: Josef Hilti
- 1971–1979: Werner Strub
- 1979–1996: Karlheinz Heeb
- 1996–1999: René Kästli
- 2000–2012: Josef Fehr
- 2012-2021: Roland Matt
- since 2021: Gabriel Brenna

== See also ==
- Economy of Liechtenstein
- List of central banks
