= Karl Freiherr Haus von Hausen =

Governor of Liechtenstein from 1861 to 1884

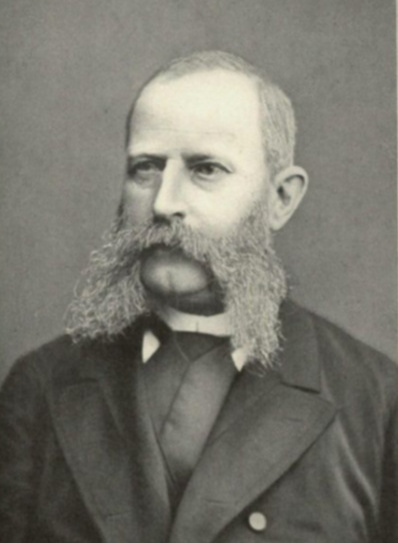

Governor of Liechtenstein
- In office April 1861 – 23 September 1884
- Monarch: Johann II
- Preceded by: Michael Menzinger
- Succeeded by: Carl von In der Maur

Personal details
- Born: 29 September 1823 Salzburg, Austrian Empire
- Died: 29 July 1889 (aged 65) Lindau, German Empire
- Party: Independent
- Spouse: Agathe Schiller (m. 1850)
- Children: 1

Karl Freiherr Haus von Hausen (29 September 1823 – 29 July 1889) was an Austrian noble and civil servant who served as the Governor of Liechtenstein from 1861 to 1884. Having grown up in Vienna in a noble family, he worked in the government of Lower Austria, and was successively a district administrator in Poysdorf and Korneuburg, and then head of the district office at Valtice, before taking up his position in Liechtenstein. As governor of the principality, he was tasked with overseeing the introduction of its 1862 constitution as well as various other reforms. He resigned in ill health in 1884 and died just under five years later, having been created a baron by the Prince of Liechtenstein in 1884.

== Early life ==
Hausen was born on 29 September 1823 at Salzburg in the Austrian Empire, the son of Karl von Hausen, an imperial and royal postmaster, and his wife Katharina, née von Demling. His paternal family, of Franconian extraction, had been elevated to the hereditary nobility by Emperor Francis II in 1797, under the name "von Hausen". He grew up in Vienna, attending a high school before studying law at the Theresian Academy.

== Early career ==
=== Austrian civil service ===
From 1845 Hausen worked as an intern in the government of Lower Austria. From 1850 to 1854 he was the district administrator of Poysdorf, then Korneuburg from 1854 to 1855. He became head of the district office in Valtice. During this time, he played a role in managing the response to a cholera pandemic in the district. As a result, he was awarded honorary citizenship in Valtice in 1861.

== Governor of Liechtenstein ==
Early on in the reign of Johann II he found resurgent calls for a new Liechtenstein constitution, and the constitutional council was reformed, which had previously been disbanded in 1852 following the revolution of 1848 in Liechtenstein. In April 1861, Hausen was appointed by Johann II as the Governor of Liechtenstein, succeeding Michael Menzinger. In this position, he acted as a mediator between the constitutional council and Johann II, and he also managed to maintain public trust in the government. At first, he created his own draft constitution but then relented and convinced Johann II to sign the draft proposed by the constitutional council, primarily produced by Karl Schädler. The draft was reviewed by an unknown German legal expert and formed the basis of the 1862 Constitution of Liechtenstein, which was ratified on 26 September. It was heavily inspired by the constitution of Vorarlberg and largely addressed the demands of the revolutionaries in Liechtenstein.

Under the new constitution, the position of Governor was formalized, and the Landtag of Liechtenstein was formed for the first time. During his time as Governor, together with now President of the Landtag of Liechtenstein Karl Schädler, they wrote several administrative laws including, but not limited to laws regarding school legislation, tax reforms, agricultural reforms and trade union regulations. Under his initiative, the National Bank of Liechtenstein was founded in 1861, and a law was passed establishing autonomy for the municipalities of Liechtenstein in 1864.

In addition, during Hausen's time as Governor, the Landtag came into political conflict with Johann II, primarily regarding foreign policy. For example, during the Second Schleswig War in 1864, Johann II supported the cause of both Austria and Prussia, whereas the Landtag had protest voted against the use of military force against Denmark. However, no action was taken. Most notably in the Austro-Prussian War of 1866 Johann II placed the Liechtenstein military at the disposal of Austria. However, the Landtag had not been consulted regarding the deployment, and the war was unpopular among the population; as such, it faced resistance from the Landtag. As a result, he promised a loan to the country and refused to have his men fight against other Germans. It was this, in combination to the rising costs of maintaining it, that led to the Liechtenstein military being disbanded in 1868 and the country declaring its permanent neutrality.

Hausen was awarded honorary citizenship in Liechtenstein on 8 July 1869 by Johann II by recommendation of the Landtag. He was made a Liechtenstein baron in 1884. Starting from the 1870s, he developed a heart condition which impeded him from his duties and eventually led to his resignation as Governor on 23 September 1884. He was succeeded by Carl von In der Maur.

=== Cabinet ===
The cabinet of Karl Freiherr Haus von Hausen were in office from 1861 to 1884, during which oversaw significant reforms and the introduction of the 1862 constitution. The cabinet was responsible for various administrative laws, including those related to education, taxation, and trade unions.

Portrait	Name	Took office	Left office	Party	Election
Karl von Hausen	Karl von Hausen (1869–1922)	April 1861	23 September 1884	Independent	1862; 1866; 1869; 1872; 1875; 1877; 1878; 1882
Franz Josef Kind	Franz Josef Kind (1821–1890)	April 1862	1877	Independent	1862; 1866; 1869; 1872; 1875; 1877
Johann Georg Matt	Johann Georg Matt	1883	23 September 1884	Independent	1882
Johann Georg Marxer	Johann Georg Marxer	1862	23 September 1884	Independent	1862; 1866; 1869; 1872; 1875; 1877; 1878; 1882

== Personal life ==
Hausen married Wilhelmine Beinhauer (9 March 1831 – 25 November 1918), the daughter of an Imperial and Royal Lower Austrian governor family, on 11 April 1850; they had one daughter together. She later married prominent architect Ignaz Bankó.

Following his resignation as Governor, Hausen moved to Innsbruck. He died on 29 July 1889 in Lindau, aged 65 years old.
