= List of Liechtenstein general elections =

Elections in Liechtenstein have been held since the ratification of the 1862 constitution in which the Landtag of Liechtenstein was established. Political parties did not exist in Liechtenstein until 1918. Before the ratification of the 1921 constitution, the head of government was not elected, but rather appointed by the prince of Liechtenstein, thus elections were only held to elect members of the Landtag. Under the constitution general elections are held for the members of the Landtag of Liechtenstein, who then elect the prime minister. As of 2025, there have been 49 general elections held in Liechtenstein.

In 1939 the voting system was changed to introduce proportional representation. The Landtag had 15 seats until a referendum in 1988 increased this to 25. Women were not allowed to vote in elections until 1984 when universal male suffrage was replaced with universal suffrage in the constitution.

== List of elections ==
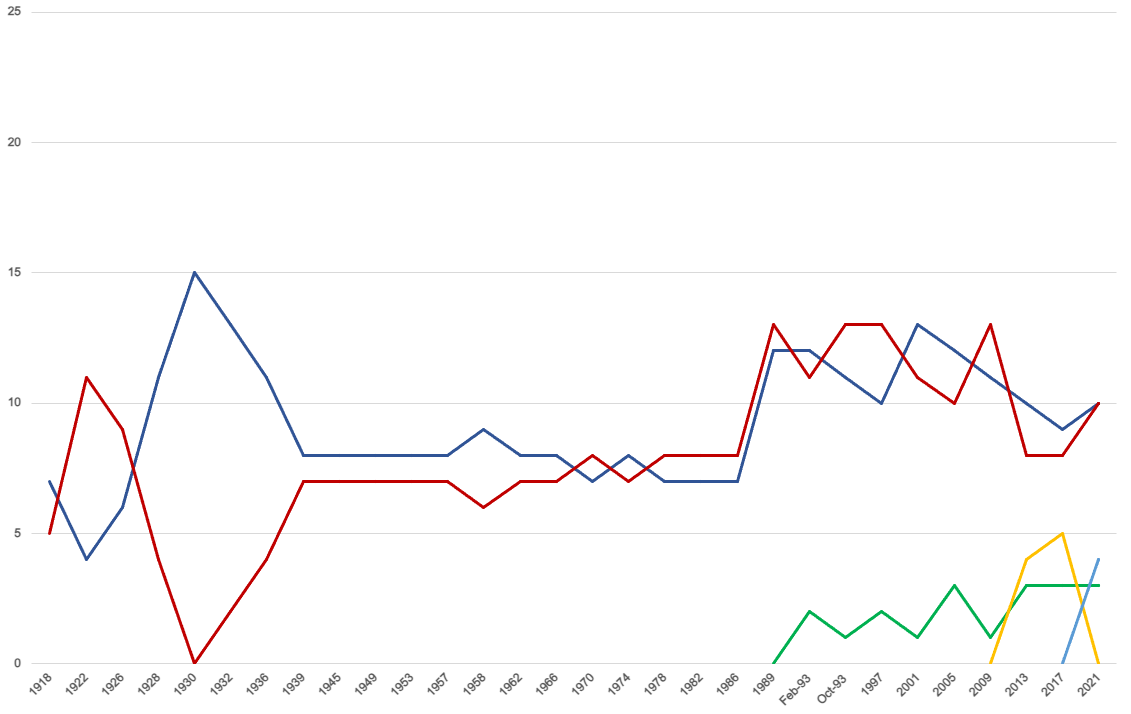
Graph of Landtag seat share by party since 1918: Progressive Citizens' Party (FBP, blue), Christian-Social People's Party (CSV, red), Free List (FL, green), The Independents (DU, yellow), and Democrats for Liechtenstein (DpL, light blue)

List of general elections (1862–present)
Election	No.	Date(s)	Elected prime minister (Note: Until 1921, the office was known as 'State Administrator' or 'Governor', and it was appointed directly by the prince)	Winning party	Winning vote share	Seat majority	Ref(s).
1862	1	24 November 1862	—	—	—	—	
1866	2	3 May 1866	—	—	—	—	
1869	3	29 April 1869	—	—	—	—	
1872	4	March 1872	—	—	—	—	
1875	5	8 May 1875	—	—	—	—	
1877	6	30 April – 18 October 1877	—	—	—	—	
1878	7	15–16 May 1878	—	—	—	—	
1882	8	2–3 May 1882	—	—	—	—	
1886	9	19–20 April 1886	—	—	—	—	
1890	10	12–16 April 1890	—	—	—	—	
1894	11	16–17 May 1894	—	—	—	—	
1898	12	11–12 May 1898	—	—	—	—	
1902	13	3–4 September 1902	—	—	—	—	
1906	14	28–30 July 1906	—	—	—	—	
1910	15	2–4 August 1910	—	—	—	—	
1914	16	30 September – 2 October 1914	—	—	—	—	
1918	17	11–18 March 1918	—	—	—	—	
1922	18	5–16 February 1922	Gustav Schädler	CSVP		11	
Jan 1926	19	10–24 January 1926	Gustav Schädler	CSVP		9	
Apr 1926	20	5 April 1926	Gustav Schädler	CSVP		9	
1928	21	15–29 July 1928	Josef Hoop	FBP		11	
1930	22	16 March 1930	Josef Hoop	FBP		15	
1932	23	6–13 March 1932	Josef Hoop	FBP		13	
1936	24	13–16 February 1936	Josef Hoop	FBP		11	
1939	25	4 April 1939	Josef Hoop	FBP		8	
1945	26	29 April 1945	Josef Hoop	FBP	54.72%	8	
1949	27	6 February 1949	Alexander Frick	FBP	52.93%	8	
Feb 1953	28	15 February 1953	Alexander Frick	FBP	50.54%	8	
Jun 1953	29	14 June 1953	Alexander Frick	FBP	50.43%	8	
1957	30	1 September 1957	Alexander Frick	FBP	52.36%	8	
1958	31	23 March 1958	Alexander Frick	FBP	54.47%	9	
1962	32	25 March 1962	Alexander Frick	FBP	47.18%	8	
1966	33	6 February 1966	Gerard Batliner	FBP	48.47%	8	
1970	34	1 February 1970	Alfred Hilbe	VU	49.57%	8	
1974	35	1–3 February 1974	Walter Kieber	FBP	50.08%	8	
1978	36	3 February 1978	Hans Brunhart	VU	50.85%	8	
1982	37	5–7 February 1982	Hans Brunhart	VU	53.47%	8	
1986	38	31 January – 2 February 1986	Hans Brunhart	VU	50.19%	8	
1989	39	March 1989	Hans Brunhart	VU	47.15%	13 (Note: First election to have 25 Landtag seats instead of 15)	
Feb 1993	40	7 February 1993	Markus Büchel	FBP	44.19%	11	
Oct 1993	41	24 October 1993	Mario Frick	VU	50.12%	13	
1997	42	2 February 1997	Mario Frick	VU	49.23%	13	
2001	43	9–11 February 2001	Otmar Hasler	FBP	49.90%	13	
2005	44	13 March 2005	Otmar Hasler	FBP	48.74%	12	
2009	45	8 February 2009	Klaus Tschütscher	VU	47.61%	13	
2013	46	3 February 2013	Adrian Hasler	FBP	40.00%	10	
2017	47	5 February 2017	Adrian Hasler	FBP	35.24%	9	
2021	48	7 February 2021	Daniel Risch	VU	35.89%	10	
2025	49	9 February 2025	Brigitte Haas	VU	38.32%	10	

== See also ==
- Politics of Liechtenstein
- List of heads of government of Liechtenstein
- List of cabinets of Liechtenstein

== Bibliography ==
- Nohlen, Dieter; Stöver, Philip (2010). Elections in Europe: A data handbook. Nomos. ISBN 978-3-8329-5609-7.
- Vogt, Paul (1987). 125 Jahre Landtag (in German). Vaduz: Landtag of the Principality of Liechtenstein.
