= 1875 Liechtenstein general election =

- 8 May 1875
- 6 seats in the Landtag
President of the Landtag before	President of the Landtag after
Wilhelm Schlegel; Independent	Wilhelm Schlegel; Independent

General elections were held in Liechtenstein on 8 May 1875 to elect 6 of the 15 members of the Landtag. Half of the twelve elected members were up for re-election after the end of their six-year term, whereas the other half had been elected in 1872 elections. The six seats were indirectly elected by electors selected by voters, while one was appointed by Johann II, Prince of Liechtenstein.

== Background ==
The term of those elected to the Landtag was six years, and as per the constitution the six members elected in the 1869 elections, representing half of the elected members, were up for election due to the expiration of their term. Similarly, two princely-appointed members were also set to be re-appointed by Johann II, Prince of Liechtenstein due to the end of their term.

The Landtag's term was characterized by the Baden Casino Company applying for a concession to build a casino in Liechtenstein in 1872, offering the country 8 million Swiss francs (approximately 66 million in 2026). Though met with considerable interest from the Landtag and the majority of the population supporting it due to Liechtenstein struggling from financial difficulties, concerns from Johann II and intervention from the Austro-Hungarian Foreign Service meant that the concession ultimately did not go through. Instead, Johann II granted the country a substantial loan to support the economy.

== Electors ==
Electors were selected through elections that were held between 26 and 30 April; each municipality had two electors for every 100 inhabitants. All male citizens aged 24 and above that were self-employed were eligible to vote.

Municipality	Electors	+/–
Balzers	22	+2
Eschen	18	0
Gamprin	6	0
Mauren	18	–2
Planken	2	0
Ruggell	10	–2
Schaan	20	0
Schellenberg	8	+2
Triesen	18	0
Triesenberg	20	0
Vaduz	18	+2
Total	160	+2
Source: Vogt

== Results ==
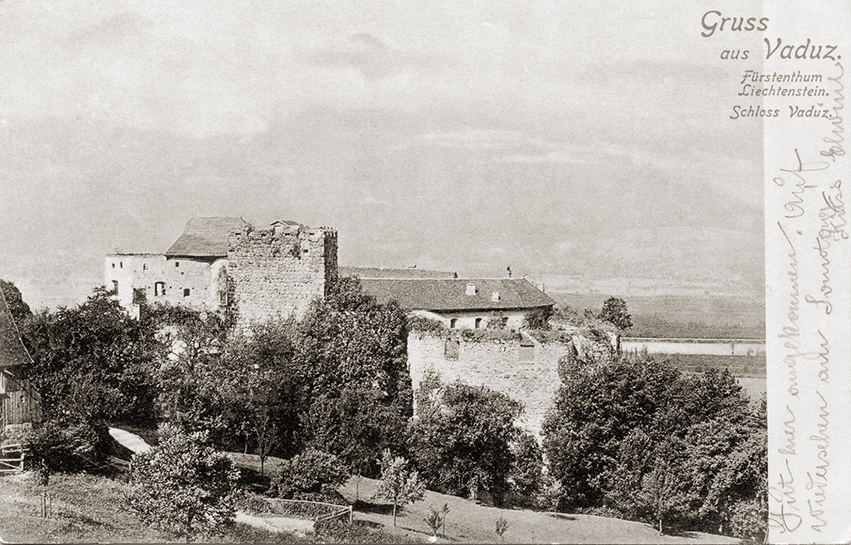
Vaduz Castle was the meeting place of the Landtag's electors

The electors met on 8 May in the hall of Vaduz Castle to elect six Landtag members and five deputy members. Of the 160 electors, 156 were present for the voting. The Landtag members and their deputies were elected in three ballots, with two other members being appointed by Johann II. There were no political parties and the election of members was almost entirely focused on an individual's personality.

=== Elected members ===
First ballot
Elected member	Municipality	Votes
Markus Kessler	Vaduz	93
Johann Alois Schlegel	Triesenberg	89
Sebastian Heeb	Ruggell	88
Ferdinand Walser	Schaan	82
Source: Vogt

Second ballot
Elected member	Municipality	Votes
Baptist Johann Fritsche	Balzers	84
Michael Kaiser	Mauren	78
Source: Vogt

Ferdinand Walser declined his election immediately and Franz Josef Kind was elected instead. Markus Kessler also declined his election and was replaced by Josef Anton Amann, as he was the deputy member who received the most votes.

=== Elected deputies ===
First ballot
Elected member	Municipality	Votes
Josef Anton Amann	Vaduz	90
Johann Birgetze	Triesen	87
Johann Georg Näscher	Gamprin	76
Franz Josef Biedermann	Schellenberg	75
Source: Vogt

Third ballot
Elected member	Municipality	Votes
Franz Josef Kind	Eschen	44
Source: Vogt

As Franz Josef Kind had been elected as a full member, his deputy position instead went to Josef Tschetter instead with 26 votes.

=== Appointed by the prince ===
Appointed member	Municipality
Josef Walser	Triesen
Johann Georg Matt	Mauren
Source: Vogt

== Aftermath ==
The first meeting of the Landtag following the elections took place on 24 May, where Schlegel was re-elected as President of the Landtag, and Josef Erni as vice president. The Landtag would be dissolved in 1877 and early elections be held due to a currency crisis in the country.
