= 1869 Liechtenstein general election =

- 29 April 1869
- 6 seats in the Landtag
President of the Landtag before	President of the Landtag after
Karl Schädler; Independent	Karl Schädler; Independent

General elections were held in Liechtenstein on 29 April 1869 to elect 6 of the 15 members of the Landtag. Half of the twelve elected members were up for re-election after the end of their six-year term, whereas the other half had been elected in 1866 elections. The six seats were indirectly elected by electors selected by voters, while two members were appointed by Johann II, Prince of Liechtenstein.

== Background ==
The term of those elected to the Landtag was six years, but as per the constitution half of the twelve Landtag members elected in the 1862 elections had to voluntarily resign after three years and allow for new elections in 1866. As such, in 1869 the remaining six members were up for election due to the expiration of their six-year term. Similarly, two princely-appointed members were also set to be re-appointed by Johann II, Prince of Liechtenstein due to the end of their terms.

Since the 1866 elections, princely-appointed Landtag member Anton Gmelch resigned his seat on 29 May 1867 and was replaced by Wilhelm Schlegel. Gregor Fischer resigned on 26 October 1868 and subsequently returned to Bavaria.

The Landtag's term was characterized by passing numerous laws including the Trademark Protection Act in 1866 and mandatory competition for church and presbytery construction projects in 1868. In 1867, the meeting place of the Landtag was moved from the Vaduzer Hof to the newly-constructed Ständehaus in Vaduz.

== Electors ==
Electors were selected through elections that were held on 18 and 19 April; each municipality had two electors for every 100 inhabitants. All male citizens aged 24 and above that were self-employed were eligible to vote.

Municipality	Electors	+/–
Balzers	20	0
Eschen	18	0
Gamprin	6	0
Mauren	20	0
Planken	2	0
Ruggell	12	0
Schaan	20	0
Schellenberg	6	0
Triesen	18	+2
Triesenberg	20	0
Vaduz	16	0
Total	158	+2
Source: Vogt

== Results ==
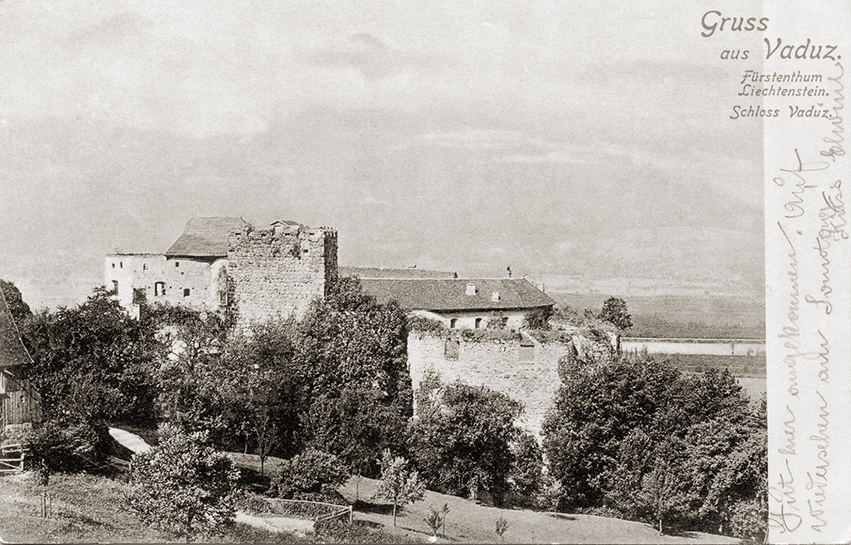
Vaduz Castle was the meeting place of the Landtag's electors

The electors met on 29 April in the hall of Vaduz Castle to elect six Landtag members and five deputy members. Of the 158 electors, 152 were present for the voting. The Landtag members and their deputies were elected in three ballots, with two other members being appointed by Johann II on 24 May. There were no political parties and the election of members was almost entirely focused on an individual's personality.

=== Elected members ===
First ballot
Elected member	Municipality	Votes
Markus Kessler	Vaduz	130
Source: Vogt

Second ballot
Elected member	Municipality	Votes
Karl Schädler	Vaduz	101
Ferdinand Walser	Schaan	80
Source: Vogt

Third ballot
Elected member	Municipality	Votes
Franz Josef Kind	Gamprin	70
Johann Georg Marxer	Vaduz	75
Johann Alois Schlegel	Triesenberg	46
Johann Josef Schafhauser	Eschen	46
Source: Vogt

Johann Alois Schlegel and Johann Josef Schafhauser received the same amount of votes, thus the result was decided via lottery which resulted in the election of Schlegel.

=== Elected deputies ===
First ballot
Elected member	Municipality	Votes
Johann Josef Schafhauser	Eschen	98
Johann Baptist Frick	Balzers	91
Josef Bargetze	Triesen	80
Source: Vogt

Second ballot
Elected member	Municipality	Votes
Martin Oehri	Eschen	75
Stefan Risch	Schaan	69
Source: Vogt

=== Appointed by the prince ===
Appointed member	Municipality
Josef Walser	Triesen
Johann Georg Matt	Mauren
Source: Vogt

== Aftermath ==
Following the elections, Karl Schädler remained as President of the Landtag and Wilhelm Schlegel as vice president.
