= 1872 Liechtenstein general election =

- 18 March 1872
- 7 seats in the Landtag
| President of the Landtag before | President of the Landtag after |
|---|---|
| Wilhelm Schlegel; Independent | Wilhelm Schlegel; Independent |

General elections were held in Liechtenstein on 18 March 1872 to elect 7 of the 15 members of the Landtag. Half of the twelve elected members were up for re-election after the end of their six-year term, whereas the other half had been elected in 1869 elections. In addition, a seventh seat was up for election to fill the vacancy left by Karl Schädler. The seven seats were indirectly elected by electors selected by voters, while one was appointed by Johann II, Prince of Liechtenstein.

== Background ==
The term of the elected Landtag was six years, and the six members elected in the 1866 elections, representing half of the elected members, were up for election due to the expiration of their term. Similarly, one princely-appointed member (Wilhelm Schlegel) was also set to be re-appointed by Johann II, Prince of Liechtenstein due to the end of their term.

An additional seventh seat was also up for election to fill the vacancy that had been left by Karl Schädler when he resigned from the Landtag on 27 May 1871 due to colorectal cancer. He was succeeded as President of the Landtag by Schlegel.

The Landtag's term was characterized by passing numerous laws including establishing a state school council in 1869, the Poor Relief Act of 1869, building ordnance in 1870, and Rhine flood protection structures in 1871.

== Electors ==
Electors were selected through elections that were held between 1 and 8 March; each municipality had two electors for every 100 inhabitants. All male citizens aged 24 and above that were self-employed were eligible to vote.

| Municipality | Electors | +/– |
|---|---|---|
| Balzers | 22 | +2 |
| Eschen | 18 | 0 |
| Gamprin | 6 | 0 |
| Mauren | 18 | –2 |
| Planken | 2 | 0 |
| Ruggell | 12 | 0 |
| Schaan | 20 | 0 |
| Schellenberg | 6 | 0 |
| Triesen | 18 | 0 |
| Triesenberg | 20 | 0 |
| Vaduz | 16 | 0 |
| Total | 158 | 0 |
Source: Vogt

== Results ==
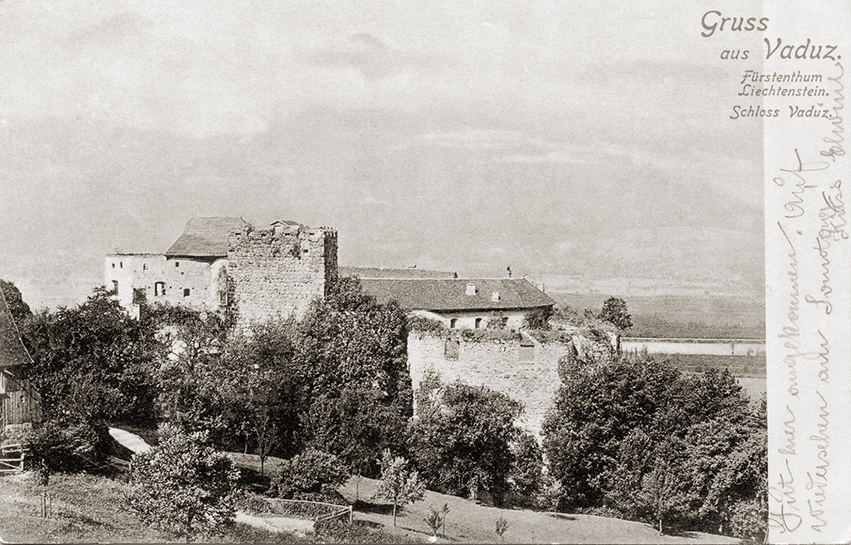
Vaduz Castle was the meeting place of the Landtag's electors

The electors met on 18 March in the hall of Vaduz Castle to elect seven Landtag members and five deputy members. Of the 158 electors, 150 were present for the voting. The Landtag members and their deputies were elected in three ballots, with one other member being appointed by Johann II. There were no political parties and the election of members was almost entirely focused on an individual's personality.

=== Elected members ===
First ballot
| Elected member | Municipality | Votes |
|---|---|---|
| Josef Erni | Ruggell | 111 |
| Christoph Wanger | Schaan | 95 |
| Rudolf Schädler | Vaduz | 89 |
| Franz Wolfinger | Balzers | 85 |
| Alois Schlegel | Eschen | 76 |
Source: Vogt

Third ballot
| Elected member | Municipality | Votes |
|---|---|---|
| Martin Josef Oehry | Eschen | 44 |
| Peter Rheinberger | Vaduz | 39 |
Source: Vogt

=== Elected deputies ===
First ballot
| Elected member | Municipality | Votes |
|---|---|---|
| Josef Anton Amann | Vaduz | 114 |
| Andreas Nägele | Schaan | 86 |
| Stefan Risch | Triesenberg | 76 |
| Johann Josef Schafhauser | Eschen | 73 |
Source: Vogt

Third ballot
| Elected member | Municipality | Votes |
|---|---|---|
| Alois Rheinberger | Vaduz | 44 |
Source: Vogt

=== Appointed by the prince ===
| Appointed member | Municipality |
|---|---|
| Wilhelm Schlegel | Schaan |
Source: Vogt

== Aftermath ==
Following the elections, Schlegel remained as President of the Landtag and Josef Erni as vice president.
