= 1882 Liechtenstein general election =

- 2–3 May 1882
- 12 seats in the Landtag
President of the Landtag before	President of the Landtag after
Wilhelm Schlegel; Independent	Albert Schädler; Independent

General elections were held in Liechtenstein on 2 and 3 May 1882 to elect 12 of the 15 members of the Landtag. The twelve seats were indirectly elected by electors selected by voters in two constituencies, Oberland and Unterland, while the remaining three were appointed by Johann II, Prince of Liechtenstein.

== Background ==
Since the 1878 elections, Landtag member Johann Georg Vogt died in office and was succeeded by Josef Tschetter.

The Landtag's term was characterized by passing laws such as the regulation of salaries of teachers in primary schools in August 1878, amendments to the tax law in 1879, and amendments to the payment of medical doctors when carrying out work for the government the same year.

== Electors ==
Electors were selected through elections that were held between 19 and 25 April in two electoral districts, Oberland and Unterland; they elected 114 and 68 electors respectively. Each municipality had two electors for every 100 inhabitants. All male citizens aged 24 and above were eligible to vote.

Municipality	Electors	+/–
Balzers	24	+2
Eschen	20	+2
Gamprin	8	+2
Mauren	20	+2
Planken	2	0
Ruggell	12	+2
Schaan	22	+2
Schellenberg	8	0
Triesen	24	+6
Triesenberg	22	+2
Vaduz	20	+2
Total	182	+22
Source: Vogt

== Results ==
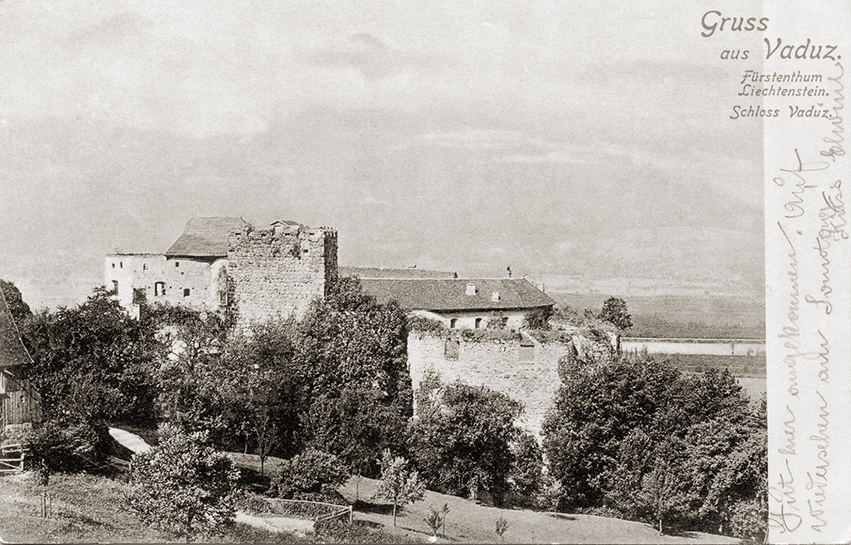
Vaduz Castle was the meeting place of the Oberland's electors

The election of Oberland's Landtag members and their deputies was held on 2 May in Vaduz Castle. Of Oberland's 114 electors, 105 were present for the voting; Oberland elected seven Landtag members and three deputies. The election of Unterland's Landtag members and substitutes was held on 3 May in Mauren. All but one of Unterland's 68 voters were present for voting; Unterland elected five Landtag members and three deputies.

The Landtag members and their deputies were elected in three ballots, with the remaining three being appointed by Johann II, Prince of Liechtenstein on 19 May. There were no political parties and the election of members was almost entirely focused on an individual's personality.

Electoral district	Seats	Electors	Turnout	Ballots	Elected members	Elected substitutes
Oberland	7	114	105	1st	Josef Anton Amann; Franz Xaver Bargetze; Christian Brunhart; Wendelin Erni; Albert Schädler; Josef Schlegel; Wilhelm Schlegel; Franz Wolfinger	Rudolf Quaderer
Oberland	7	114	105	2nd	–	Josef Isidor Brunhart; Ferdinand Walser
Oberland	7	114	105	3rd	Franz Josef Beck	–
Unterland	5	68	67	1st	Franz Josef Biedermann; Sebastian Heeb; Peter Simon Marxer; Martin Joseph Oehry	Franz Josef Kind
Unterland	5	68	67	2nd	Jakob Kaiser	Johann Gstöhl
Unterland	5	68	67	3rd	–	Franz Josef Ritter
Source: Vogt

As no candidate from Schaan had been elected, electors from the municipality left the voting place in protest, but the election continued.

Wendelin Erni and Wilhelm Schlegel were tied in the first ballot for the election of Oberland's Landtag members, but Schlegel did not accept his election. Johann Alois Schlegel and Franz Wolfinger alongside deputies Franz Josef Kind and Rudolf Quaderer also did not accept their elections. Ferdinand Walser was substituted in as a full member for Oberland.

=== Appointed by the prince ===
Appointed member	Municipality
Josef Erni	Vaduz
Gebhard Gantner	Planken
Franz Josef Kind	Gamprin
Source: Vogt

== Aftermath ==
The first meeting of the newly-elected Landtag took place on 25 May, where Albert Schädler was elected as President of the Landtag, with Peter Simon Marxer as vice president.
