= 1862 Liechtenstein general election =

- 24 November 1862
- 12 seats in the Landtag
President of the Landtag after
Karl Schädler; Independent

General elections were held in Liechtenstein on 24 November 1862 to elect 12 of the 15 members of the Landtag. The twelve seats were indirectly elected by electors selected by voters, with the remaining three members being appointed by the prince. They were the first general elections held in the country following the ratification of the 1862 Constitution of Liechtenstein in September of the same year, in which the Landtag was established.

== Background ==
Liechtenstein had received its first democratically elected legislature following the Revolution of 1848 in Liechtenstein, known as the Landrat (District Council). The Landrat was formed as part of constitutional transitional provisions serving as a concession to revolutionaries' demands by Aloys II, Prince of Liechtenstein. The 24-member District Council met from May 1849 to February 1850, and had powers to approve laws and the state budget. However, as the German revolutions failed, Aloys II again imposed absolute rule via reactionary decree in July 1852 and disbanded the District Council, reinstating the 1818 constitution.

Though the District Council and a new constitution had failed, calls once again appeared for a new constitution early into the reign of Johann II, Prince of Liechtenstein. Karl Schädler, who had previously unsuccessfully drafted a new constitution following the 1848 revolution, formed the constitutional council anew, leading it, and drafting the majority of another new constitution. The draft was reviewed by an unknown German legal expert and formed the basis of the 1862 Constitution of Liechtenstein, which was ratified on 26 September; the constitution largely addressed the demands of the revolutionaries in Liechtenstein. This constitution established civil liberties in the country and formed the Landtag of Liechtenstein.

== Electors ==
Electors were selected through elections that were held between 3 and 17 November; each municipality had two electors for every 100 inhabitants. All male citizens aged 24 and above that were self-employed were eligible to vote.

Municipality	Electors
Balzers	20
Eschen	18
Gamprin	6
Mauren	20
Planken	2
Ruggell	12
Schaan	20
Schellenberg	6
Triesen	16
Triesenberg	20
Vaduz	16
Total	156
Source: Vogt

== Results ==
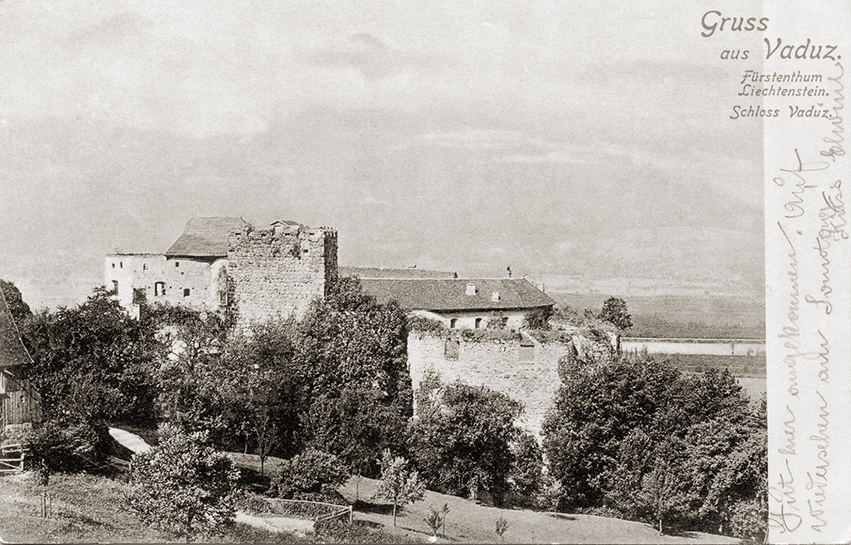
Vaduz Castle was the meeting place of the Landtag's electors

All 156 electors met on 24 November in the hall of Vaduz Castle to elect 12 Landtag members and five deputy members. The Landtag members and their deputies were elected in three ballots, with the three remaining members being appointed by Johann II. Landtag members served a six-year term. There were no political parties and the election of members was almost entirely focused on an individual's personality.

=== Elected members ===
First ballot
Elected member	Municipality	Votes
Karl Schädler	Vaduz	147
Markus Kessler	Vaduz	142
Christoph Wanger	Schaan	142
Andreas Kieber	Mauren	128
Johann Josef Schafhauser	Eschen	115
Josef Erni	Ruggell	106
Josef Bargetze	Triesen	89
Franz Wolfinger	Balzers	87
Johann Baptist Büchel	Triesenberg	80
Franz Anton Kirchthaler	Vaduz	79

Third ballot
Elected member	Municipality	Votes
Johann Baptist Quaderer	Schaan	72
Gregor Fischer	Vaduz	64

=== Elected deputies ===
First ballot
Elected member	Municipality	Votes
Wilhelm Schlegel	Vaduz	100
Josef Walser	Triesen	78

Second ballot
Elected member	Municipality	Votes
Franz Josef Laternser	Eschen	108

Third ballot
Elected member	Municipality	Votes
Johann Baptist Beck	Triesenberg	107
Franz Josef Schlegel	Schaan	59

=== Appointed by the prince ===
Appointed member	Municipality
Anton Gmelch	Balzers
Franz Josef Kind	Gamprin
Josef Anton Wolfinger	Vaduz

Josef Anton Wolfinger declined his appointment and was replaced by Johann Georg Marxer.

== Aftermath ==
The Landtag met for the first time on 10 December 1862. Chaired by its oldest member Andreas Kieber, it confirmed the election results and elected Karl Schädler as the first President of the Landtag and Christoph Wanger as the first vice president. The official opening ceremony was held on 29 December and was opened by governor Karl Freiherr Haus von Hausen on behalf of Johann II.

== Literature ==
- Vogt, Paul (1987). 125 Jahre Landtag (in German). Vaduz: Landtag of the Principality of Liechtenstein.
