= 1878 Liechtenstein general election =

- 15–16 May 1878
- 12 seats in the Landtag
President of the Landtag before	President of the Landtag after
Rudolf Schädler; Independent	Wilhelm Schlegel; Independent

General elections were held in Liechtenstein on 15 and 16 May 1878 to elect 12 of the 15 members of the Landtag. Early elections were called following the dissolution of the Landtag to allow the usage of new electoral reforms as part of the compromise between the Oberland and Unterland regions. The twelve seats were indirectly elected by electors selected by voters in the newly-formed Oberland and Unterland electoral districts, while the remaining three were appointed by Johann II, Prince of Liechtenstein.

== Background ==
Following a currency crisis that led to the premature dissolution of the Landtag, the 1877 elections had been postponed due to a lack of quorum as the Unterland region refused to participate in voting. The election continued after months of negotiations between the Oberland and Unterland regions. As part of the compromise reached between the two sides, the elected Landtag was only to convene to allow for the duration necessary to amend the constitution to implement electoral reforms, after which it would willingly dissolve and allow for new elections.

The compromise stipulated that Liechtenstein would be split into two electoral districts, Oberland and Unterland, that elected seven and five seats respectively. In addition, the term of the Landtag was reduced from six to four years and all members would be elected or appointed at the same time. Suffrage was also expanded, allowing people who were domestic servants or had criminal investigations against them to vote. The requirement of being self-employed to vote was also abolished.

== Electors ==
Electors were selected through elections that were held between 16 and 30 April in two electoral districts, Oberland and Unterland; they elected 100 and 60 electors respectively. Each municipality had two electors for every 100 inhabitants. All male citizens aged 24 and above were eligible to vote.

Municipality	Electors	+/–
Balzers	22	0
Eschen	18	0
Gamprin	6	0
Mauren	18	0
Planken	2	0
Ruggell	10	0
Schaan	20	0
Schellenberg	8	0
Triesen	18	0
Triesenberg	20	0
Vaduz	18	0
Total	160	0
Source: Vogt

== Results ==
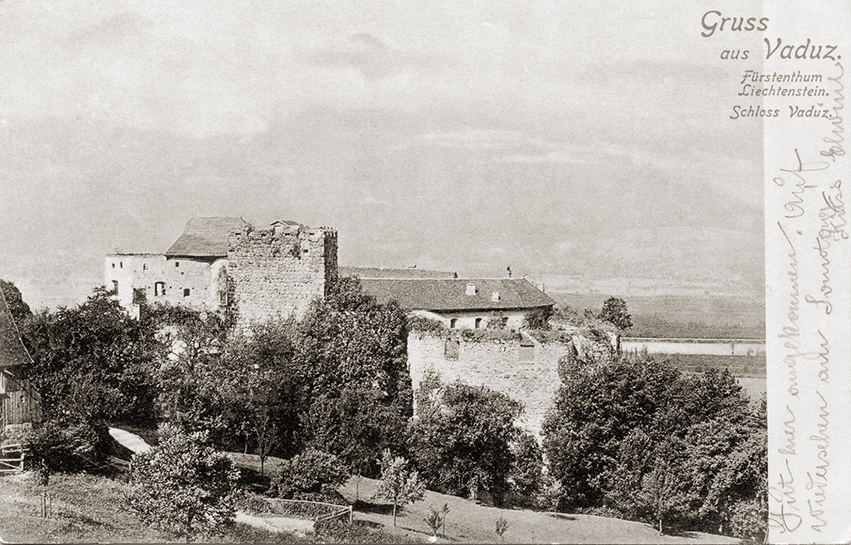
Vaduz Castle was the meeting place of the Oberland's electors

The election of Oberland's Landtag members and their deputies was held on 15 May in Vaduz Castle. Of Oberland's 100 electors, 96 were present for the voting; Oberland elected seven Landtag members and three deputies. The election of Unterland's Landtag members and substitutes was held on 16 May in Mauren. All 60 voters were present for voting; Unterland elected five Landtag members and two deputies.

The Landtag members and their deputies were elected in three ballots, with the remaining three being appointed by Johann II, Prince of Liechtenstein on 1 June. There were no political parties and the election of members was almost entirely focused on an individual's personality.

Electoral district	Seats	Electors	Turnout	Ballots	Elected members	Substitutes
Oberland	7	100	96	1st	Johann Alois Schlegel; Wilhelm Schlegel; Christoph Wanger; Wendelin Erni; Johann Georg Vogt; Peter Rheinberger; Josef Anton Amann	–
Oberland	7	100	96	2nd	–	Rudolf Schädler; Josef Gassner; Josef Tschetter
Oberland	7	100	96	3rd	–	–
Unterland	5	60	60	1st	Martin Joseph Oehry; Sebastian Heeb; Franz Josef Biedermann; Franz Josef Kind; Michael Kaiser	Karl Schädler
Unterland	5	60	60	2nd	–	–
Unterland	5	60	60	3rd	–	Rudolf Ignaz Öhri
Source: Vogt

Rudolf Schädler declined his election as a deputy member and was replaced by Xaver Bargetzi.

=== Appointed by the prince ===
Appointed member	Municipality
Josef Walser	Triesen
Johann Georg Matt	Mauren
Franz Wolfinger	Balzers
Source: Vogt

== Aftermath ==
The first meeting of the newly-elected Landtag took place on 8 June, where Wilhelm Schlegel was elected as President of the Landtag, with Christoph Wanger as vice president.
