= Liechtensteinischen Landeszeitung =

Bi-monthly newspaper in Liechtenstein from 1863 to 1868

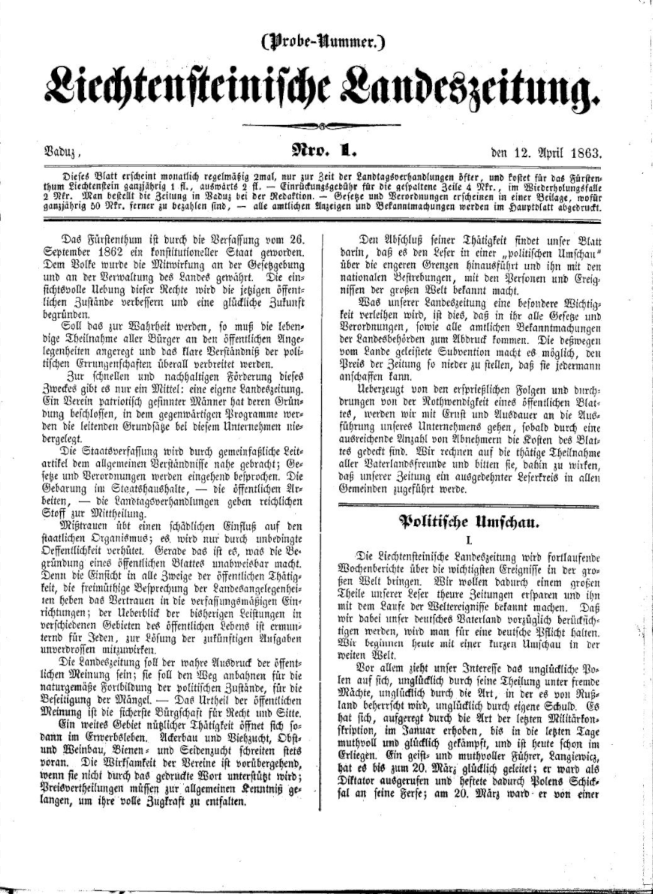
- Front page, 12 April 1863
- Founder(s): Gregor Fischer; Karl Schädler
- Founded: 12 April 1863; 163 years ago
- Ceased publication: 17 October 1868; 157 years ago
- Language: German
- Country: Liechtenstein

Liechtensteinischen Landeszeitung (lit. 'Liechtenstein Regional Newspaper') was a bi-monthly newspaper published in Liechtenstein from 1863 to 1868. It was the first newspaper in the country.

== History ==
The newspaper was founded on 12 April 1863 under the initiative Landtag of Liechtenstein member Gregor Fischer and President of the Landtag of Liechtenstein Karl Schädler six months following the ratification of the 1862 Constitution of Liechtenstein, and they were both the sole editors.

It was intended to increase political education within Liechtenstein and was regarded a figure piece of the democratic reforms in the country, yet was loyal to reigning prince Johann II. The newspaper was published bi-monthly until 1865 when it was made tri-monthly, then from 1868 it was bi-monthly once again.

Fischer stopped editing the newspaper in 1868 and returned to his home-country of Bavaria, shortly after which the newspaper ceased publication on 17 October 1868.

== See also ==
- List of newspapers in Liechtenstein
