= 1877 Liechtenstein general election =

- 30 April 1877 (first round); 18 October 1877 (second round)
- 12 seats in the Landtag
President of the Landtag before	President of the Landtag after
Wilhelm Schlegel; Independent	Rudolf Schädler; Independent

General elections were held in Liechtenstein on 30 April and 18 October 1877 to elect 12 of the 15 members of the Landtag. Early elections were called following the dissolution of the Landtag due to a currency crisis in the country. The Landtag election that took place on 30 April was suspended and did not resume until 18 October. The twelve seats were indirectly elected by electors selected by voters, while the remaining three were appointed by Johann II, Prince of Liechtenstein.

It was the first time that the Landtag was dissolved prematurely and led to several electoral reforms in Liechtenstein, most notably the introduction of the Oberland and Unterland electoral districts that would be used for the first time in the 1878 elections called the following year.

== Background ==
From 1873 to 1876, the Austro-Hungarian gulden, which was being used as legal tender in Liechtenstein since entering a customs union with Austria in 1859, dropped in value by 10%. This created disadvantages in trade between Liechtenstein and Switzerland, especially for the Oberland region. However, the Unterland region did not see any visible losses as it mainly traded with the region of Vorarlberg in Austria. This led to a debate on the introduction of a gold currency from 1874, particularly in the Oberland, whereas the Unterland sought to maintain the current system.

Following the renewal of the customs treaty with Austria, which restored Liechtenstein's monetary sovereignty, the Landtag enacted the Coinage Act in December 1876, adopting the gold standard and effectively making the Swiss franc legal tender in the country. The four Landtag members from the Unterland refused to participate in the session and subsequently resigned their seats. In January 1877, people from the Unterland organized a protest in Vaduz, led by Martin Joseph Oehry, while the Landtag was in session, with the protesters demanding that the Coinage Act be repealed and for the dissolution of the Landtag; the Unterland region threatened to secede from Liechtenstein and join Austria if their demands were not met.

In response, the remaining Landtag members resigned their seats on 15 January, and Johann II, Prince of Liechtenstein conceded to the Unterland's demands, thus subsequently dissolved the Landtag and suspended the Coinage Act via emergency decree on 18 January, although with the intention of it being re-discussed by the newly-elected Landtag. It was the first time since its founding in 1862 that the Landtag had been prematurely dissolved.

== Electors ==
Electors were selected through elections that were held between 22 March and 14 April; each municipality had two electors for every 100 inhabitants. All male citizens aged 24 and above that were self-employed were eligible to vote.

Municipality	Electors	+/–
Balzers	22	0
Eschen	18	0
Gamprin	6	0
Mauren	18	0
Planken	2	0
Ruggell	10	0
Schaan	20	0
Schellenberg	8	0
Triesen	18	0
Triesenberg	20	0
Vaduz	18	0
Total	160	0
Source: Vogt

== Results ==
=== April election ===
The electors met on 30 April in Vaduz to elect twelve Landtag members and five deputy members. Of the 160 electors, 154 were present for the voting.

Elected member	Municipality	Votes
Johann Georg Vogt	Balzers	110
Wendelin Erni	Triesen	93
Johann Alois Schlegel	Triesenberg	91
Markus Kessler	Vaduz	91
Christoph Wanger	Schaan	89
Wilhelm Schlegel	Vaduz	85
Josef Erni	Vaduz	84
Ferdinand Walser	Schaan	78
Source: Vogt

Markus Kessler and Ferdinand Walser declined their elections.

In the first ballot, eight of the twelve elected seats were filled out with candidates from the Oberland, and none from the Unterland. As the Unterland felt disadvantaged having 60 electors compared to Oberland's 100, the Unterland electors did not participate in the second round of voting and thus the election was suspended due to a lack of quorum as at least two-thirds of electors had to be present.

=== October election ===
The election of the Landtag continued on 18 October after negotiations between the representatives of Oberland and Unterland. Of the 160 electors, 148 participated in the voting. The remaining six Landtag members and their five deputies were elected in three ballots, with three other members being appointed by Johann II on 10 November.

==== Elected members ====
First ballot
Elected member	Municipality	Votes
Sebastian Heeb	Ruggell	136
Johann Georg Hasler	Eschen	111
Franz Josef Kind	Gamprin	109
Rudolf Schädler	Vaduz	100
Jakob Kaiser	Mauren	91
Franz Josef Biedermann	Schellenberg	86
Source: Vogt

==== Elected deputies ====
First ballot
Elected member	Municipality	Votes
Josef Tschetter	Schaan	114
Josef Anton Amann	Vaduz	93
Josef Gassner	Triesenberg	74
Peter Rheinberger	Vaduz	74
Source: Vogt

Third ballot
Elected member	Municipality	Votes
Alois Rheinberger	Vaduz	84
Source: Vogt

==== Appointed by the prince ====
Appointed member	Municipality
Josef Walser	Triesen
Johann Georg Matt	Mauren
Franz Wolfinger	Balzers
Source: Vogt

== Aftermath ==
The first meeting of the newly-elected Landtag took place on 18 November, where Rudolf Schädler was elected as President of the Landtag, with Josef Erni as vice president.

As part of the compromise between the Oberland and Unterland regions, the newly-elected Landtag was only intended to convene for the duration necessary to amend the constitution to implement electoral reforms, after which it would willingly dissolve and allow for new elections. Of these changes, it most notably included the introduction of Oberland and Unterland as electoral districts that elected seven and five Landtag members respectively. However, the Coinage Act was not discussed again, and Liechtenstein continued to use the Austro-Hungarian gulden.
