= 1866 Liechtenstein general election =

- 3 May 1866
- 6 seats in the Landtag
President of the Landtag before	President of the Landtag after
Karl Schädler; Independent	Karl Schädler; Independent

General elections were held in Liechtenstein on 3 May 1866 to elect 6 of the 15 members of the Landtag. Article 98 of the 1862 constitution stipulated that half of the twelve elected members had to resign after three years. The six seats were indirectly elected by electors selected by voters.

== Background ==
The term of the elected Landtag was six years, but per Article 98 of the 1862 Constitution of Liechtenstein half of the twelve serving members had to voluntarily resign their seats after three years and allow for new elections. Those who had to give up their seats were decided in a Landtag session on 9 October 1865 via lottery.

The Landtag's term was characterized by passing numerous laws, including renewing the customs treaty between Liechtenstein and Austria in 1863, formalizing the municipal law of Liechtenstein in 1864, and the Tax Act of 1865.

== Electors ==
Electors were selected through elections that were held between 4 March and 22 April; each municipality had two electors for every 100 inhabitants. All male citizens aged 24 and above that were self-employed were eligible to vote.

Municipality	Electors	+/–
Balzers	20	0
Eschen	18	0
Gamprin	6	0
Mauren	20	0
Planken	2	0
Ruggell	12	0
Schaan	20	0
Schellenberg	6	0
Triesen	16	0
Triesenberg	20	0
Vaduz	16	0
Total	156	0
Source: Vogt

== Results ==
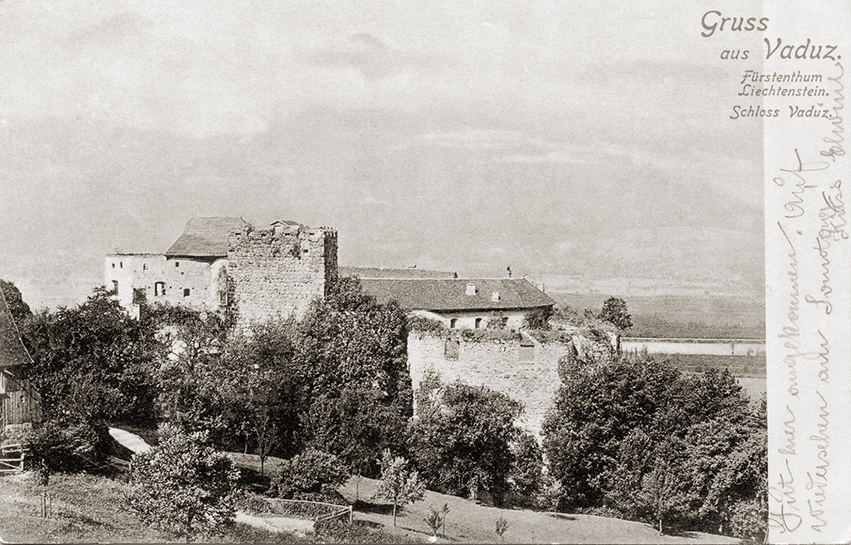
Vaduz Castle was the meeting place of the Landtag's electors

The electors met on 3 May in the hall of Vaduz Castle to elect six Landtag members and one deputy member. Of the 156 electors, 154 were present for the voting. The Landtag members and the deputy were elected in three ballots. There were no political parties and the election of members was almost entirely focused on an individual's personality.

=== Elected members ===
First ballot
Elected member	Municipality	Votes
Josef Erni	Ruggell	115
Franz Wolfinger	Balzers	94
Source: Vogt

Second ballot
Elected member	Municipality	Votes
Josef Bargetze	Triesen	79
Johann Baptist Beck	Triesenberg	76
Source: Vogt

Third ballot
Elected member	Municipality	Votes
Christoph Wanger	Schaan	77
Alois Josef Schlegel	Eschen	75
Source: Vogt

Josef Bargetze declined his election and was succeeded by deputy Johann Baptist Quaderer.

=== Elected deputy ===
First ballot
Elected member	Municipality	Votes
Johann Baptist Quaderer	Schaan	104
Source: Vogt

The remaining deputy positions were left vacant.

== Aftermath ==
The first meeting of the Landtag following the elections took place on 15 May. Karl Schädler remained as President of the Landtag and Josef Erni as vice president.
