= Ludwig Grass =

Liechtensteiner medical doctor and politician (1789–1860)

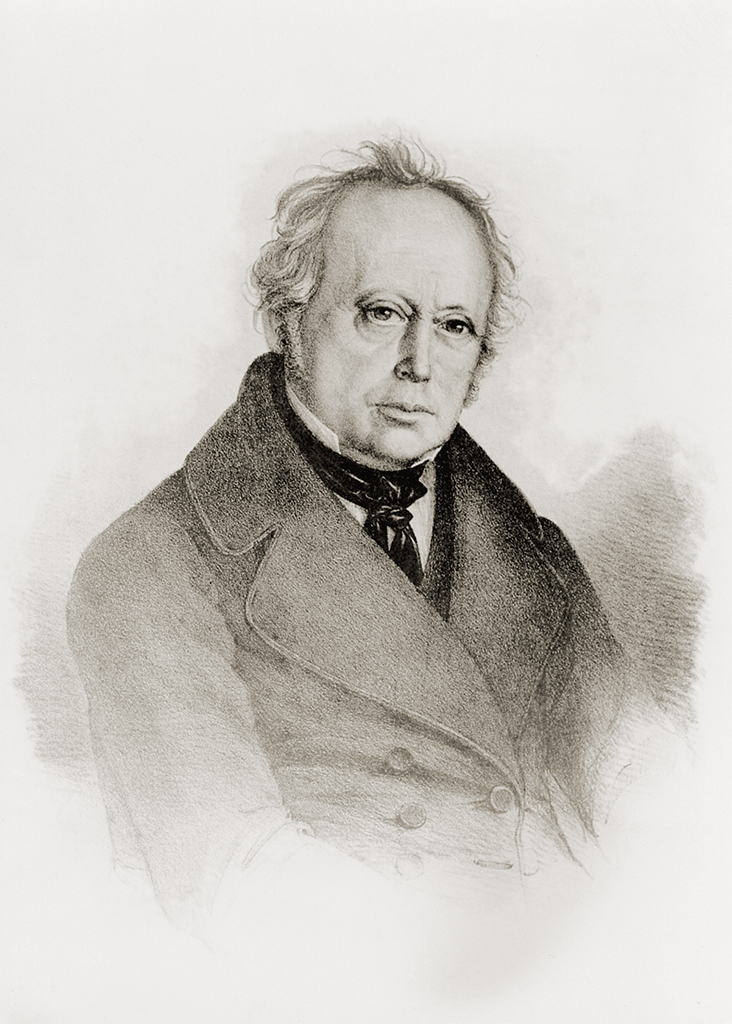
- 1850 portrait

Personal details
- Born: Josef Johann Ludwig; 24 August 1789 Vaduz, Liechtenstein
- Died: 29 November 1860 (aged 71) Vaduz, Liechtenstein
- Parent(s): Christoph Grass; Maria Josepha Zech

Josef Johann Ludwig (24 August 1789 – 29 November 1860), more commonly known as Ludwig Grass, was a Liechtensteiner medical doctor and politician.

== Early life ==
Grass was born on 24 August 1789 in Vaduz as the son of doctor Christoph Grass and his mother Maria Josepha Zech as one of two children. He attended high school in Feldkirch and from 1807 to 1813 he studied medicine in the University of Vienna and Landshut, where he received a doctorate in 1813. In 1811, he became member of Corps Bavaria in Munich.

== Medical career and patronage ==
In Vienna, Grass met Peter Kaiser, with whom he remained friends with his whole life. In December 1813, he started working as a physician in Vaduz. Besides Gebhard Schädler, he was the only academically trained doctor in Liechtenstein at the time and he often treated many of his sick patients free of charge. From 1820 to 1829, he was a member of the Graubünden Medical Association.

Grass was a prominent proponent of the expansion of education in Liechtenstein and donated a considerable amount of his wealth towards this goal. He supported the opening of the first girls school in Vaduz in 1845 and, in 1852, he donated two houses and the surroundings to be used as teacher's apartments. As a result of this, a new primary school was built, which was also intended to provide space for a new high school to be built. In 1857, he donated 20,000 Guilders (approximately 450,000 Swiss francs today) in order to fund the building of a state high school in Vaduz, which was opened in 1858.

== Political career ==
When his childhood friend Michael Menzinger became a state administrator in 1833, Grass became politically active in Liechtenstein. He supported the liberal ideas against the absolute monarchy of Aloys II and the movement by Peter Kaiser, which led to the 1848 Liechtenstein revolution. On 22 March 1848, the people's committee appointed a three-person committee to lead the Liechtenstein revolutionary movement, which included Kaiser, Grass, and Karl Schädler. Together, they managed to prevent the revolution from escalating and resorting to violence.

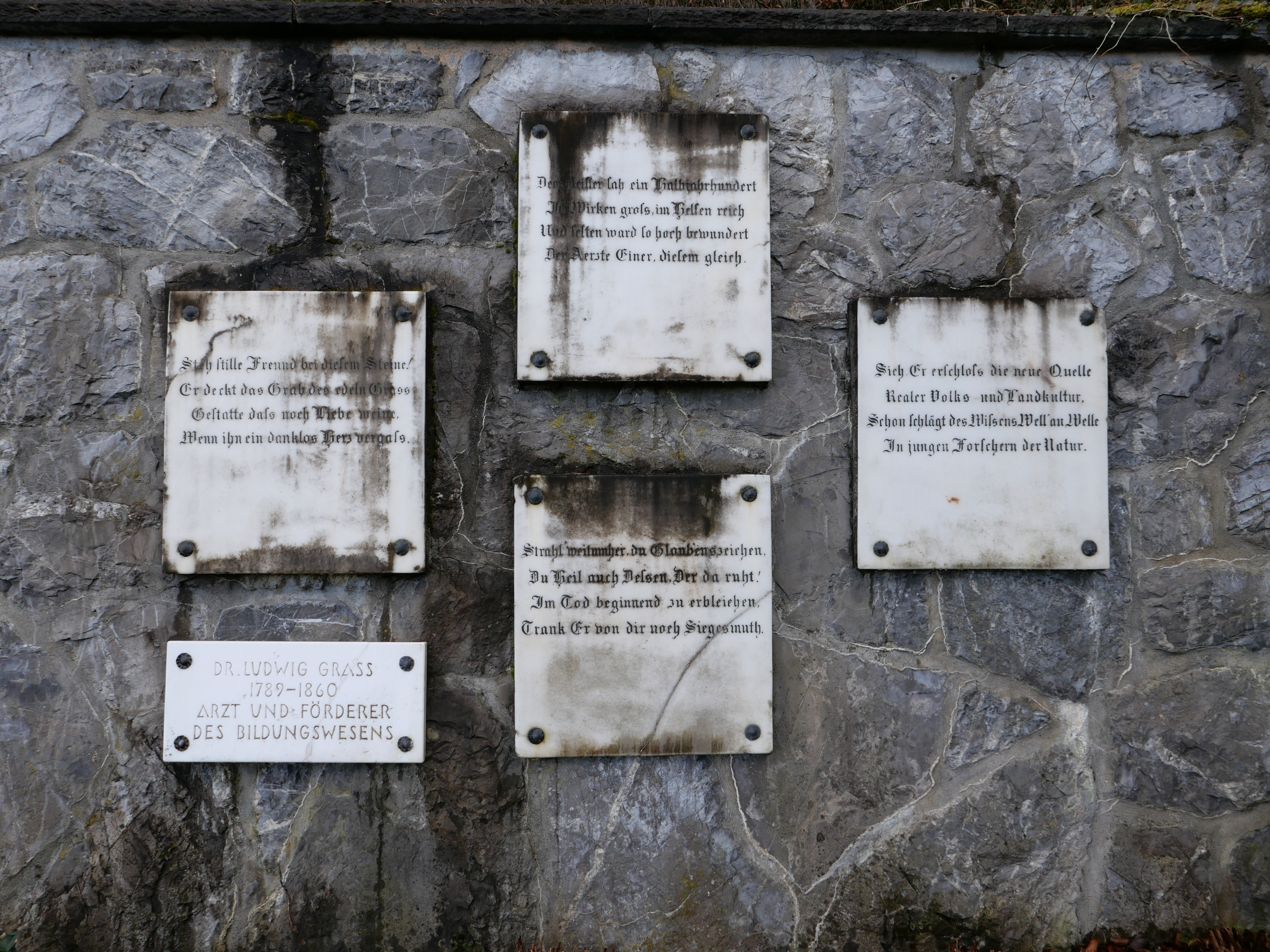
The plaques at the cemetery of Vaduz

Grass was elected as a member of the constitutional council on 27 July 1848, tasked with creating the draft for a new Liechtenstein constitution. On 20 May 1849, he was elected to the district administrator, where he was a member of the five-person committee intended forward suggestions for the issues to be dealt with by the district administrator, Karl Schädler.

Grass died on 29 November 1860 in Vaduz, aged 71. Several commemorative plaques at the cemetery of Vaduz praise his character and his commitment to give medical healing and to spread knowledge through education.
