= Johann Baptist Quaderer =

Liechtenstein politician (1810–1875)

Member of the Landtag of Liechtenstein
- In office 1862–1872

Mayor of Schaan
- In office 1864–1870
- Preceded by: Position established
- Succeeded by: Ferdinand Walser

Personal details
- Born: 31 October 1810 Schaan, Liechtenstein
- Died: 17 May 1875 (aged 64) Schaan, Liechtenstein
- Spouse(s): Regina Getzner (m. 1842; died 1854) Regina Getzner (m. 1857; died 1858) Regina Getzner (m. 1860)
- Children: 5

Johann Baptist Quaderer (31 October 1810 – 17 May 1875) was a politician from Liechtenstein who served in the Landtag of Liechtenstein from 1862 to 1872. He was also the first mayor of Schaan, serving from 1864 to 1870.

In the 1866 elections, Quaderer was elected as a deputy member of the Landtag, but succeeded Josef Bargetze as a full member the same year. He was the landlord of an inn and from 1840 worked as a part-time brewer.

He married Anna Maria Näscher (25 May 1824 – 22 February 1854) on 13 June 1842 and they had three children together. He then went on to marry Maria Anna Stadelmann (12 May 1829 – 9 September 1858) on 23 November 1857. Finally, he married Katharina Falk (13 October 1827 – 28 May 1891) on 13 February 1860 and they had another two children together. His son from his first marriage, Rudolf Quaderer, also served in the Landtag.

== Bibliography ==
- Vogt, Paul (1987). 125 Jahre Landtag (in German). Vaduz: Landtag of the Principality of Liechtenstein.
