= Gebhard Schädler =

Liechtensteiner surgeon (1776–1842)

Personal details
- Born: 21 September 1776 Mauren, Liechtenstein
- Died: 20 November 1842 (aged 66) Bendern, Liechtenstein
- Spouse: Maria Katharina Hasler (m. 1803)
- Children: 9, including Karl

Military service
- Allegiance: Holy Roman Empire; Helvetic Republic
- Years of service: 1792–1797; 1799–1801
- Rank: Surgeon general
- Wars: War of the First Coalition

Josef Gebhard Schädler (21 September 1776 – 20 November 1842) was a surgeon from Liechtenstein.

== Early life ==
Schädler was born on 21 September 1776 as the son of surgeon Johann Georg Gebhard Schädler and his mother Maria Sabine Bayer as one of three children. He attended high school in Feldkirch and from 1796 to 1798 he studied medicine in the University of Freiburg, where he received a master's degree in surgery.

== Career ==
Schädler fought as a member of the 20-man Liechtenstein volunteer corps against the French during the War of the First Coalition, where he was wounded in 1797. From 1799 to 1801 he was a regimental surgeon of a Graubünden regiment in the Netherlands.

He was the first academically trained doctor in Liechtenstein and opened his own medical practice in Eschen in 1801, later in Nendeln. From 1802 he was a regional doctor in Unterland and from 1809 to 1842 he was state physicist. Due to this, he moved to Vaduz as it had been assigned to him as his official residence. He built a private medical library and fought against quackery in the medical field, where on his initiative compulsory smallpox vaccinations were introduced for Liechtenstein citizens in 1812. Schädler was the first doctor to provide obstetrics and train midwives in the country, as well as treat poor sick people and royal officials in addition to medical examinations for the Liechtenstein military.

In 1842, he retired to Bendern with his son Karl Schädler taking over his medical practice, where he died on 20 November 1842, aged 66 years old.

== Personal life ==
Schädler married Maria Katharina Hasler (1 January 1784 – 3 November 1861) in 1803 and they had nine children together. His son Karl Schädler took over his medical practice and was President of the Landtag of Liechtenstein from 1862 to 1870.
