= Gregor Fischer =

Bavarian-Liechtensteiner teacher and politician (1834–unknown)

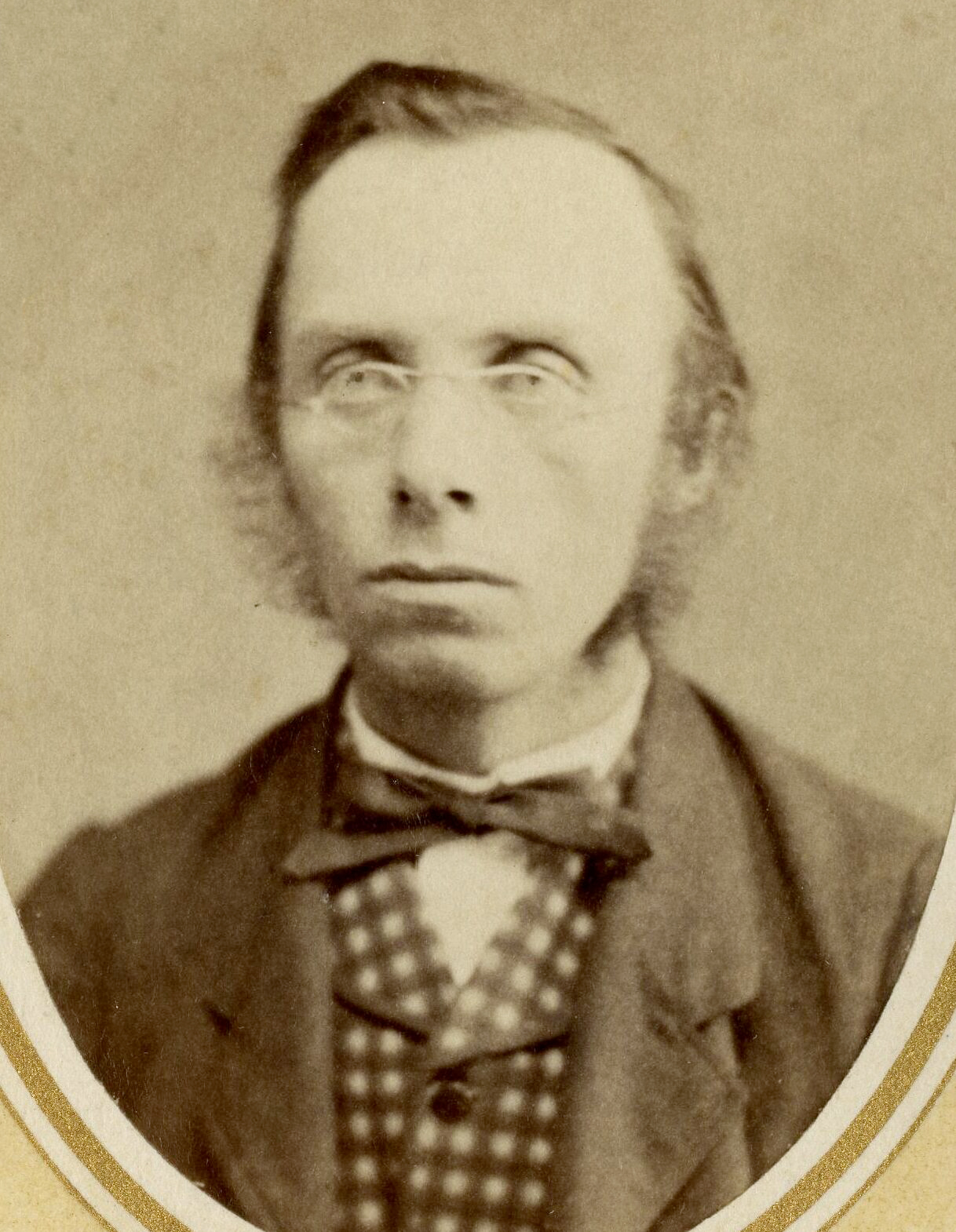
- Fischer in 1867

Member of the Landtag of Liechtenstein for Oberland
- In office 24 November 1862 – 26 October 1868

Personal details
- Born: 7 June 1834
- Died: Unknown

Gregor Fischer (7 June 1834 – unknown) was a Bavarian-Liechtensteiner teacher and politician who served in the Landtag of Liechtenstein from 1862 to 1868.

== Life ==
Not much is known about Fischer's life prior moving to Liechtenstein other than that he was Bavarian and attended teachers training college in Würzburg. He was a secondary school teacher in Vaduz from 1860 until the school was closed in 1868. He also offered teaching for craftsmen and farmers.

Fischer was a member of the Landtag of Liechtenstein from 1862 until he resigned on 26 October 1868. During this time, under his initiative and alongside Karl Schädler, he co-founded Liechtenstein's first newspaper - the Liechtensteinischen Landeszeitung, which he edited from 1863 to 1868. He returned to Bavaria in 1868 and the newspaper ceased publication shortly afterwards.

Following his return to Bavaria, he worked as a school inspector in Würzburg. The time and place of his death are unknown.

== Bibliography ==
- Vogt, Paul (1987). 125 Jahre Landtag (in German). Vaduz: Landtag of the Principality of Liechtenstein.
