= Karl Schädler =

President of the Landtag of Liechtenstein from 1862 to 1870

President of the Landtag of Liechtenstein
- In office January 1862 – December 1870
- Monarch: Johann II
- Vice President: Josef Erni; Wilhelm Schlegel
- Preceded by: Position established
- Succeeded by: Wilhelm Schlegel

Member of the Landtag of Liechtenstein
- In office 24 November 1862 – 27 May 1871

Personal details
- Born: 23 October 1804 Eschen, Liechtenstein
- Died: 30 January 1872 (aged 67) Vaduz, Liechtenstein
- Spouse: Katharina Walser (m. 1844)
- Children: 9, including Albert and Karl
- Parents: Gebhard Schädler; Maria Katharina Hasler
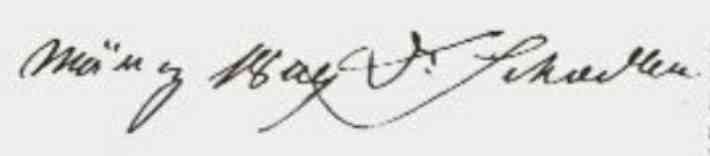
- Signature

Military service
- Allegiance: Switzerland
- Years of service: 1833–1838
- Rank: Surgeon general

Josef Karl Severin Schädler (/ˈʃɛdlər/ SHED-lər, German: [kaʁl ˈʃɛːdlɐ]; 23 October 1804 – 30 January 1872) was a physician and politician from Liechtenstein who served as the first President of the Landtag of Liechtenstein from 1862 to 1870, and was a member of the Landtag from 1862 to 1871.

A member of the prominent 19th-century Schädler family, he was a leading figure in the 1848 Liechtenstein revolution and represented the country in the National Assembly in Frankfurt, which led to the liberalization of the country and he was the primary author of the 1862 Constitution of Liechtenstein. Domestically, he worked as a physician and pioneered medical reforms and expansion in Liechtenstein.

As president of the Landtag, he wrote several administrative laws for Liechtenstein but also came into conflict with Johann II over issues such as Liechtenstein's involvement in the Second Schleswig War and Austro-Prussian War. In 1870 he was diagnosed with colorectal cancer and he resigned from the Landtag in May 1871. He died the following year, aged 67.

== Early life ==
Schädler was born on 23 October 1804 in Eschen as the son of physician Gebhard Schädler and of Maria Katharina Hasler, as one of nine children. His father moved his medical practice to Nendeln thus Schädler and his family moved to the village. In 1809, his father was appointed state physicist for the government of Liechtenstein and the family moved to Vaduz. During his childhood in Vaduz, he lived in a residential apartment which had been designated as his father's official place of residence.

From 1818 to 1822, he once again moved and attended high school in Feldkirch, then from 1824 to 1829, he studied medicine in the University of Vienna. He briefly returned to Vaduz for a year of internship in his father's medical practice before he received a doctorate in medicine at the University of Erlangen–Nuremberg in Bavaria.

== Medical career ==
From 1830 to 1837, Schädler ran a medical practice in Bad Ems in the Duchy of Nassau, and from 1833 to 1838, he was a military doctor for a Graubünden battalion. At military courses in Thun, Switzerland, he met Louis Napoleon Bonaparte, who would later become Emperor of the French. In 1838, he closed his practice in Bad Ems and returned to Vaduz in order to run his father's medical practice in the city after he had fallen ill. He retired in 1842 and died shortly afterwards. Afterwards, Schädler formally took over the practice. The practice offered general medicine and surgery, and was available to every citizen in the country, but also offered services to neighbouring towns in Austria and Switzerland. He ran the practice until 1869 when it was taken over by his sons Albert and Rudolf.

In 1844, he succeeded his father as state physician (Landesphysikus) for the government of Liechtenstein. During this time, he pioneered increased training for midwives and conducting forensic medical examinations of the Liechtenstein military. In 1848, Schädler conducted the first chloroform anaesthesia surgery in Liechtenstein, a year after its introduction by James Young Simpson. He also owned vineyards and agricultural sites within the country.

== Political career ==
=== 1848 revolution and Frankfurt assembly ===
Schädler was politically influenced by his time in Switzerland and became subscribed to liberal ideals. Upon returning to Liechtenstein in 1838, he became a supporter of Peter Kaiser and supported the liberal ideas against the absolute monarchy of Aloys II, which led to the 1848 Liechtenstein revolution led around Kaiser. The aim of the revolution was to improve the economic and political situation of ordinary citizens in Liechtenstein, primarily fuelled by the worsening economy in the country in the years prior. It was also partially inspired by similar revolutions in France and in the German Confederation. On 22 March 1848, the people's committee appointed a three-person committee to lead the Liechtenstein revolutionary movement, which included Kaiser, Schädler and Ludwig Grass. In this position, the three men succeeded in preventing the revolution from escalating and resorting to violence.

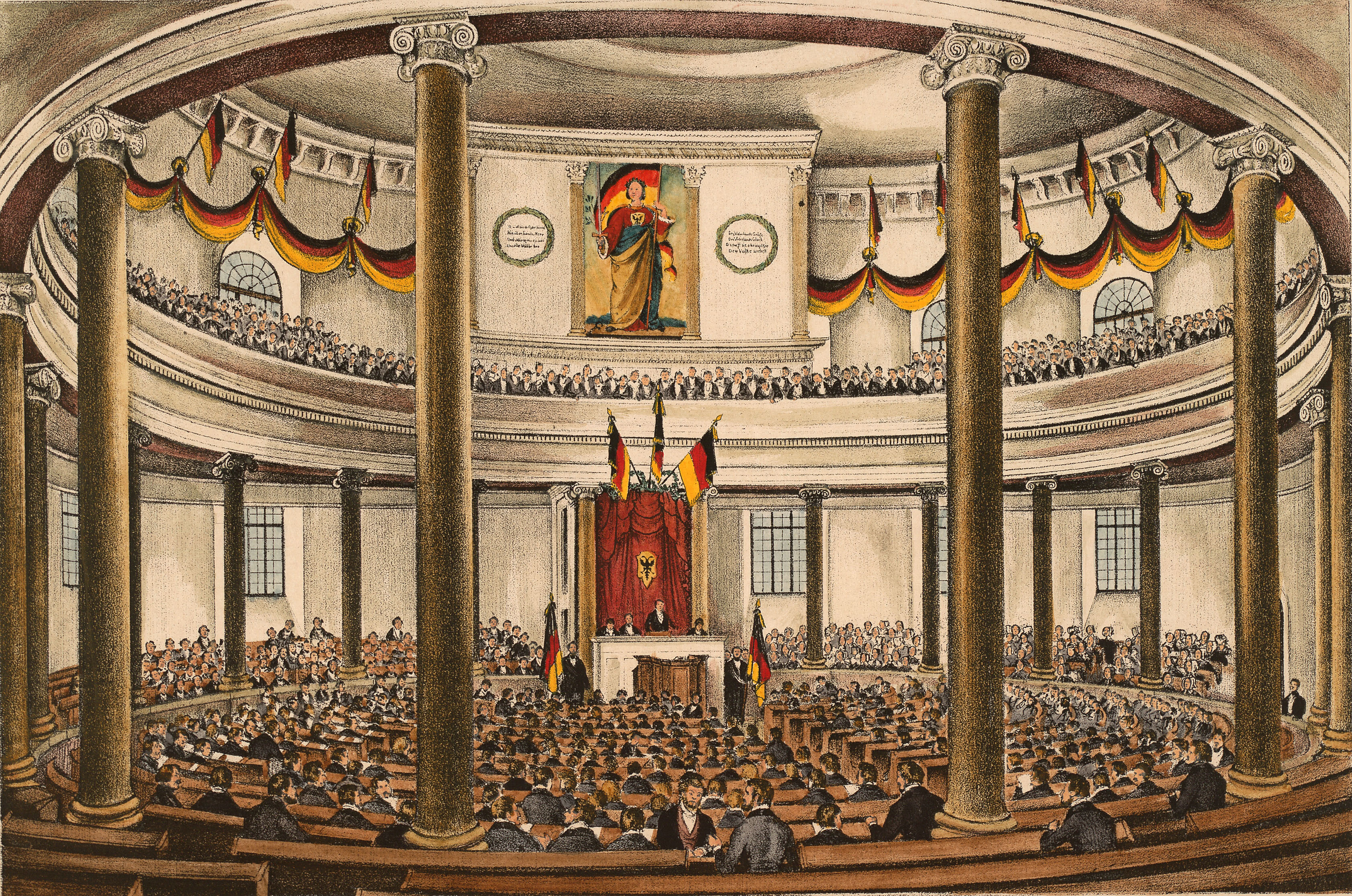
Frankfurt National assembly's meeting in St. Paul's Church, of which Schädler was a member.

Following the revolution, a constitutional council was elected on 27 July 1848 in response to popular demand from the revolutionaries, of which Schädler was elected as its president. The primary task of the council was the creation the draft for a new Liechtenstein constitution, of which the work was done primarily by himself and Michael Menzinger.

Peter Kaiser withdrew from politics in November, and Schädler was elected as his successor as the Liechtenstein representative at the National Assembly in Frankfurt the following month. He served in the assembly until April 1849 and took part in the creation of an imperial German constitution. From this point, Schädler was considered to be the de facto leader of the revolutionary movement in Liechtenstein. Regarding Pan-Germanism, he supported the movement under Austrian leadership, as he believed that the formation of a German state without Austria would have isolated Liechtenstein and put the country's sovereignty at risk. Notably, Schädler was pessimistic about the future of Liechtenstein, believing that with the rise of Pan-Germanism the country was more suited to be annexed into Austria. In the National Assembly, he was a member of the Pariser Hof, a centre-left faction. On 28 March 1849, the Assembly elected Frederick William IV of Prussia as Emperor of the Germans. In response, Schädler abstained from the vote in protest. He made several personal propositions in the assembly, though with little success. Regarding the law in German elections, he campaigned for Liechtenstein to be its own constituency, instead of it being under an Austrian one instead. In addition, he also campaigned for the reduction of the country's financial and military obligations, which he succeeded in by having a demand that Liechtenstein contribute an additional 60 soldiers withdrawn.

After constitutional council drafted a provisional constitution, Schädler was elected District Administrator on 7 March 1849, which functioned as the head of the District Council - the first democratic representation in Liechtenstein. The council held its first session from 23 May to 14 February 1850. The election was led by him and took place along a provisional electoral system he himself had designed. A major challenge faced by Schädler was the legal reduction in local community autonomy on a national level and he created new municipal regulations. However, they were not approved by Aloys II and not implemented. In the Frankfurt assembly, Schädler had been in talks with the Austrian representative for the proposition of the formation of a customs union between Austria and Liechtenstein, which was also a subject of popular demand from revolutionaries within Liechtenstein. In 1850, he formally raised the question with Aloys II and appealed for him to propose a union to Franz Joseph I of Austria. After two years of negotiations, this succeeded and the two countries formally entered in a customs union with each other in June 1852.

=== Constitution and President of the Landtag ===
After the failure of the revolution in Germany, Aloys II suspended the constitutional council and disbanded the office of District Administrator on 20 July 1852. However, Schädler remained the leader and leading figure of the democratic movement in Liechtenstein. Calls for a new constitution once again appeared early in the reign of Johann II and the constitutional council was reformed again led by Schädler, once again tasked with drafting a new constitution, of which, similarly to 1848, he did most of the work. The draft was reviewed by an unknown German legal expert and formed the basis of the 1862 Constitution of Liechtenstein, which was ratified on 26 September. It was heavily inspired by the constitution of Vorarlberg and largely addressed the demands of the revolutionaries in Liechtenstein.

Under the new constitution, Schädler was the first President of the Landtag of Liechtenstein from 1862 to 1870. He was also chairman of the state committee and finance commission. Upon the opening of the Landtag of Liechtenstein on 29 December 1862, he gave a speech and declared that its intention was to allow for the economic and cultural development of the country as well as making ordinary citizens aware of their liberties and political rights. During his time in the Landtag, together with Governor of Liechtenstein Karl Freiherr Haus von Hausen, they wrote several administrative laws including, but not limited to laws regarding school legislation, tax reforms, agricultural reforms and trade union regulations. He also co-founded the first newspaper in Liechtenstein alongside Gregor Fischer - the Liechtensteinischen Landeszeitung, which he edited from 1863 to 1868.

Schädler came into political conflict with Johann II during his time as president of the Landtag, primarily regarding foreign policy. For example, during the Second Schleswig War in 1864, Johann II supported the cause of both Austria and Prussia, whereas the Landtag had protest voted against the use of military force against Denmark. However, no action was taken. Most notably in the Austro-Prussian War of 1866 Johann II placed the Liechtenstein military at the disposal of Austria. However, the Landtag had not been consulted regarding the deployment and the war was unpopular among the population, as such it faced resistance from the Landtag. As a result, he promised a loan to the country and refused to have his men fight against other Germans. It was this, in combination to the rising costs of maintaining it, that led to the Liechtenstein military being disbanded in 1868 and the country declaring its permanent neutrality. In 1870, Schädler was diagnosed with colorectal cancer which was determined to be untreatable. As a result, he resigned from the Landtag on 27 May 1871.

== Personal life and family ==
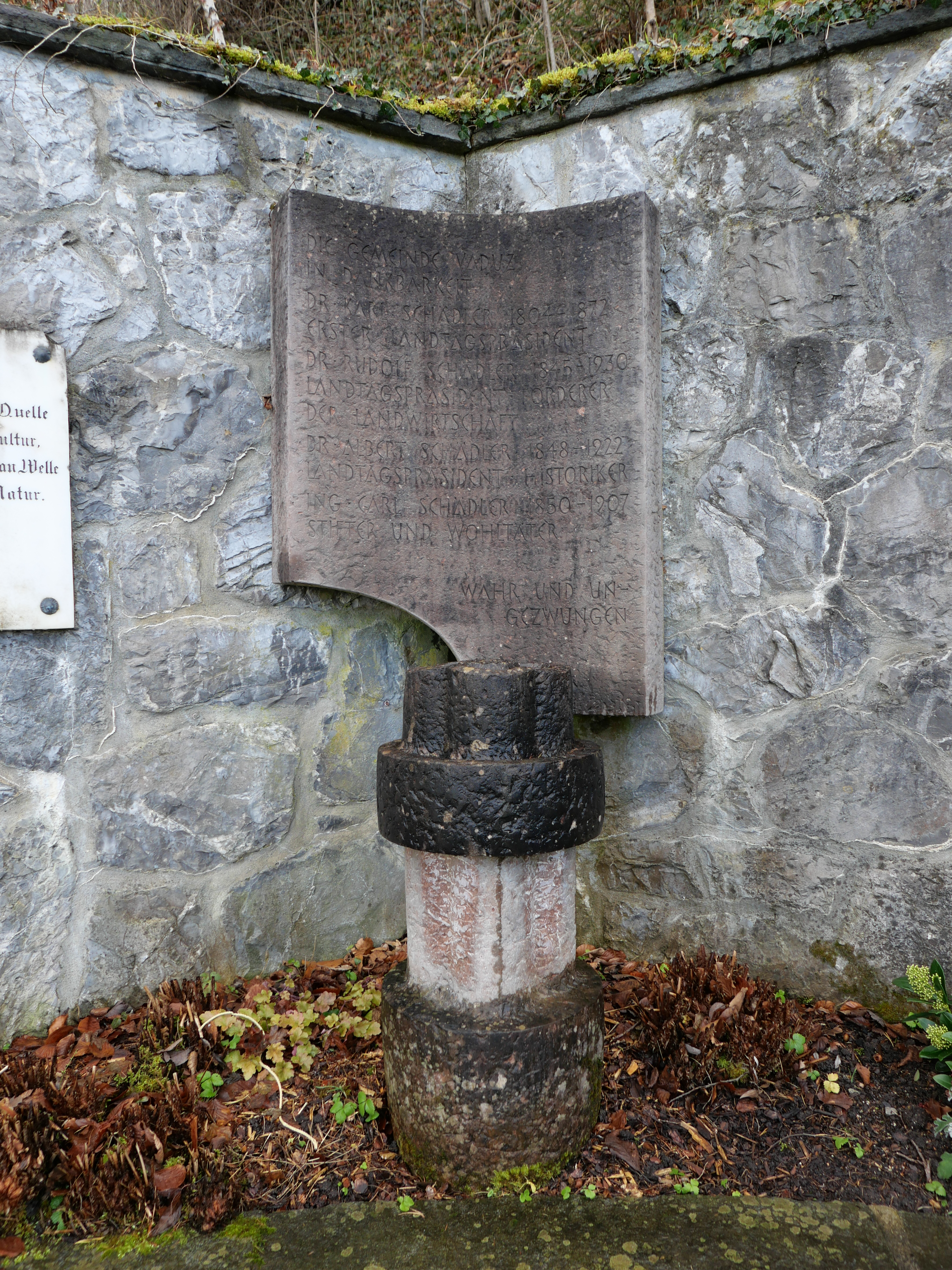
The commemorative plaque in Vaduz. It bears the inscription "true and unforced".

Schädler married Katharina Walser in 1844 and they had nine children together. His sons Albert Schädler and Rudolf Schädler took over his medical practice in 1869. In addition, them and his other son Karl Schädler served in the Landtag of Liechtenstein, with Albert being the President of the Landtag of Liechtenstein from 1882 to 1885 and again from 1890 to 1918.

He died on 30 January 1872 of colorectal cancer, aged 67. A commemorative plaque in the cemetery of Vaduz was set up in his honour.

== See also ==
- 1862 Constitution of Liechtenstein

== Bibliography ==
- Rheinberger, Rudolf (1991). Liechtensteiner Ärzte des 19. Jahrhunderts (in German). Vaduz: Jahrbuch des Historischen Vereins für das Fürstentum Liechtenstein.
- Geiger, Peter (1970). Geschichte des Fürstentums Liechtenstein 1848 bis 1866 (in German). University of Zurich, Jahrbuch des Historischen Vereins für das Fürstentum Liechtenstein.
- Besl, Friedrich; Brunhart, Arthur (1999). Gerichtsärztliches Kontrollbuch vom Landesphysikat. Geführt von Dr. Karl Schädler in den Jahren 1840–1872 (in German). Vol. 2. Zurich. pp. 307–330.
- Schädler, Albert (1901). Die Thätigkeit des liechtensteinischen Landtages im 19. Jahrhundert (in German). Vol. 1. Vaduz: Jahrbuch des Historischen Vereins für das Fürstentum Liechtenstein.
