= Markus Kessler =

Swiss rower

Personal information
- Nationality: Switzerland
- Born: 18 May 1992 (age 32)
- Height: 1.98 m (6 ft 6 in)

Sport
- Sport: Rowing

Markus Kessler (born 18 May 1992) is a Swiss rower. He competed in the 2020 Summer Olympics.
