= Josef Bargetze =

Liechtensteiner politician (1810–1874)

Josef Bargetze (20 April 1810 in Triesen – 9 February 1874) was a Liechtenstein politician.

Bargetze was born to Josef Bargetze and his wife Anna Maria, née Beck. He was an innkeeper by profession when he was elected to the Liechtenstein Parliament in 1862. After the 1866 election, he resigned from parliament because a lottery had to determine whose term would run until 1866 or 1869.

In the 1869 election, Bargetze was elected deputy to the Landtag. He married Maria Anna, née Kindle, and had five children with her, including Franz Xaver Bargetze.

== Literature ==
- Paul Vogt: 125 Years of the Parliament. Published by the Parliament of the Principality of Liechtenstein. Vaduz 1987, 2nd edition.
