= Peter Kaiser (historian) =

Liechtensteiner historian and statesman (1793–1864)

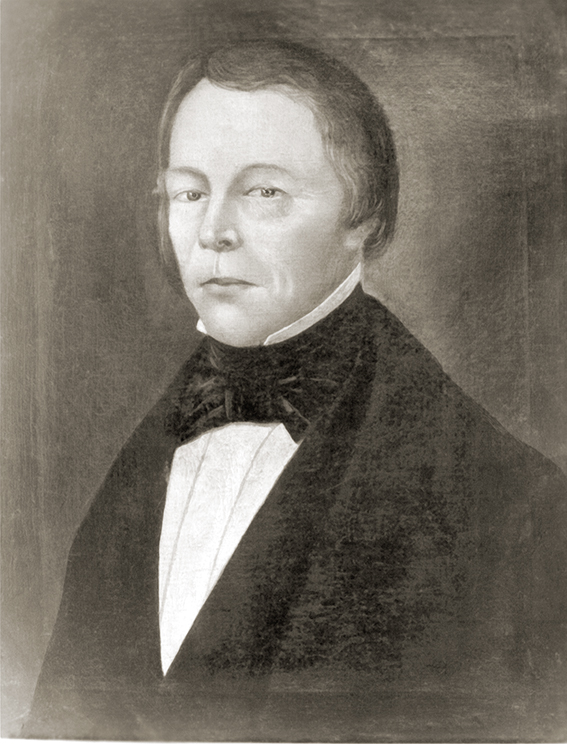
- Born: 1 October 1793; Mauren, Principality of Liechtenstein
- Died: 23 February 1864 (aged 70); Chur, Switzerland
- Occupation(s): Historian, statesman
- Known for: Leader of the Liechtenstein revolutionary movement in 1848
- Notable work: History of The Principality of Liechtenstein

Peter Kaiser (1 October 1793 – 23 February 1864) was a historian and statesman from Liechtenstein.

== Life ==
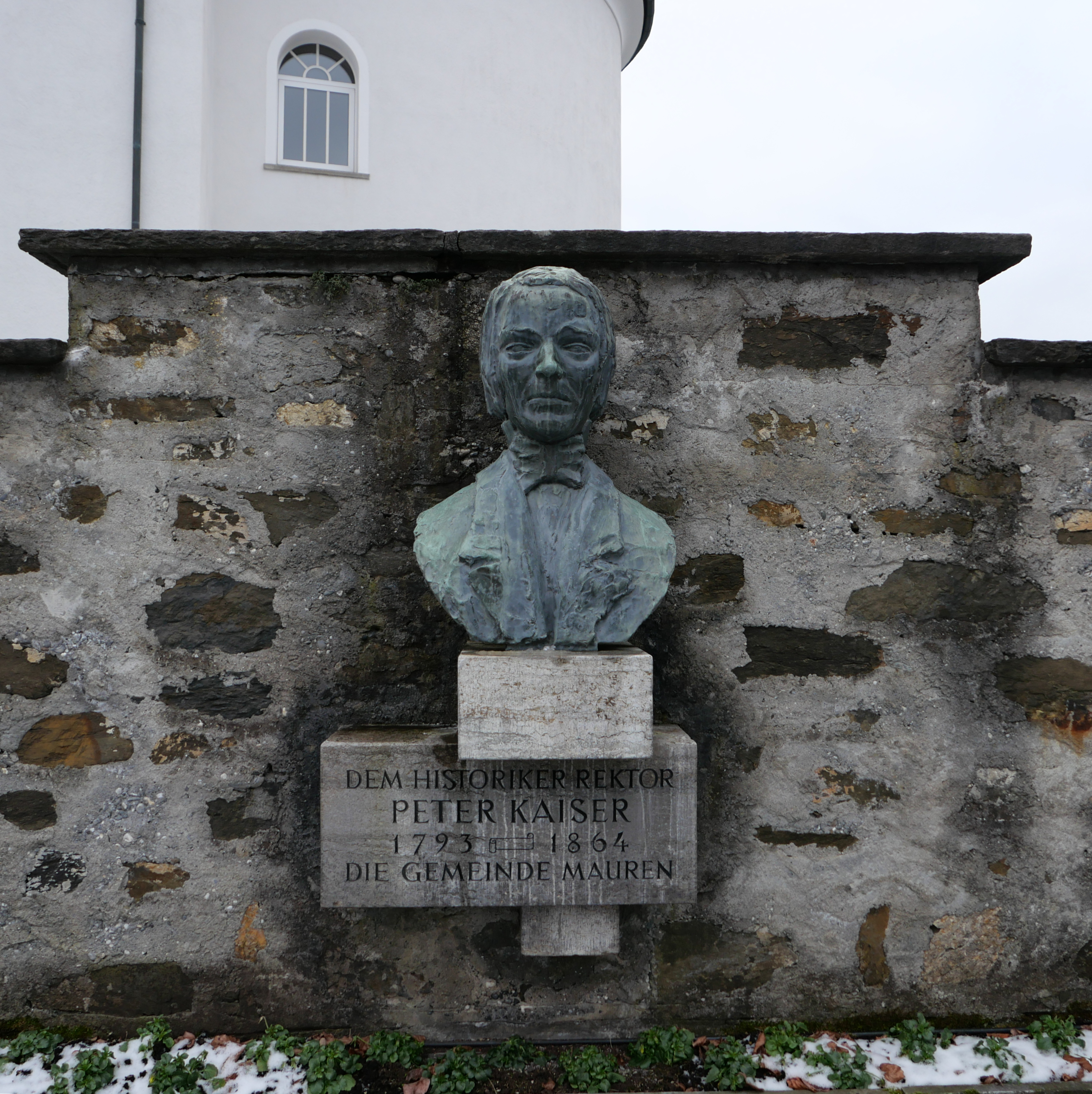
Memorial to Kaiser in Mauren.

Kaiser was born in Mauren, in the Principality of Liechtenstein as one of eleven children. He studied languages and history in Feldkirch, Vienna and Freiburg/Breisgau.

Kaiser became known as a proponent of the rights of the common people or serfs in his home country. In 1820, during the Congress of Vienna, he promoted German unification and rights issues. Due to the unpopularity of this stand in an age of imperialism, he was subsequently forced out of Germany. Kaiser moved to Switzerland and became a professor in Hofwil (Bern). In 1836, he taught in Aarau and then in Disentis, in the Grisons.

In 1843, Kaiser was appointed as a representative to Prince Alois in Vienna. Kaiser published History of The Principality of Liechtenstein in 1846, which was initially banned in Liechtenstein, but the ban was later lifted by Prince Alois.

In 1848, Kaiser was named as the representative of the Principality’s Diet to the Parliament of Frankfurt. During this year, the political climate changed dramatically in Europe, and the citizens of Liechtenstein began demanding a liberalization of their rights under the constitution, including free elections. Initially, Prince Alois promised constitutional reform and a public works program, but this did not abate the revolutionary ferver. Kaiser, who was a member of the local revolutionary committee, sought to avoid violence by appealing directly to the Prince, and due to his standing, was heard. Open violent revolution was thus avoided and genuine changes were enacted.

After this success, Kaiser turned from politics back to teaching. On 23 February 1864, Kaiser died in Chur, Switzerland. Kaiser is credited with helping to define the "Liechtenstein identity", and a memorial to him was erected in Mauren in 1955.

== Bibliography ==
- History of The Principality of Liechtenstein (1846)
