= Franz Wolfinger =

Liechtenstein politician (1820–1893)

Member of the Landtag of Liechtenstein
- In office 24 November 1862 – 1882

Mayor of Balzers
- In office 1867–1870
- Preceded by: Johann Georg Büchel
- Succeeded by: Baptist Fritsche

Personal details
- Born: Franz Josef Callistus Wolfinger; 14 October 1820 Balzers, Liechtenstein
- Died: 20 March 1893 (aged 72) Balzers, Liechtenstein
- Spouse(s): Regina Getzner (m. 1846; died 1864) Carolina Thoma (m. 1866)
- Children: 10

Franz Josef Callistus Wolfinger (14 October 1820 – 20 March 1893) was a politician from Liechtenstein who served in the Landtag of Liechtenstein from 1862 to 1882. He was also mayor of Balzers from 1867 to 1870.

Wolfinger worked as a postmaster in Balzers of the Thurn-und-Taxis Post from 1850, which he had taken over from his father. He was a judge in Balzers from 1860 to 1863. In the 1882 Liechtenstein general election, he refused his re-election to the Landtag.

He married Regina Getzner (13 November 1820 – 18 May 1864) on 11 May 1846 and they had eight children together. He then went on to marry Carolina Thoma (1837 – Unknown) on 8 January 1866 and they had another two children together. His son from his second marriage, Emil Wolfinger, also served in the Landtag.

== Bibliography ==
- Vogt, Paul (1987). 125 Jahre Landtag (in German). Vaduz: Landtag of the Principality of Liechtenstein.
