= 1862 Constitution of Liechtenstein =

The 1862 Constitution of the Principality of Liechtenstein (German: Verfassung des Fürstentums Liechtenstein) was signed into law by Johann II, Prince of Liechtenstein on September 26 in Eisgrub, Moravia. It established civil liberties in the country and formed the Landtag of Liechtenstein for the first time. It was replaced by the modern Constitution of Liechtenstein in 1921.

== Background ==
Like most of Europe at the time, Liechtenstein was subject to the German revolutions of 1848–1849 which caused increased opposition to against the absolute monarchy of Aloys II. On 22 March 1848, the people's committee appointed a three-person committee to lead the Liechtenstein revolutionary movement, which included Peter Kaiser, Karl Schädler and Ludwig Grass. Together, they managed to maintain order in Liechtenstein and formed a constitutional council.

After the failure of the German revolutions, Aloys II once again instated absolute power over Liechtenstein. Calls for a new constitution appeared early in the reign of Johann II and the constitutional council was reformed by Karl Schädler, tasked with drafting a new constitution. Similarly to 1848, he did most of the work. The draft was reviewed by an unknown German legal expert and formed the basis of the constitution, which was ratified on 26 September. It was heavily inspired by the constitution of Vorarlberg and largely addressed the demands of the revolutionaries in Liechtenstein. This constitution established civil liberties in the country and formed the Landtag of Liechtenstein for the first time. In November, the 1862 Liechtenstein general election took place, being the first general elections held in the country.

== Bibliography ==
- Vogt, Paul (1987). 125 Jahre Landtag (in German). Vaduz: Landtag of the Principality of Liechtenstein.
