= Vaduz Castle =

Castle in Liechtenstein

- Schloss Vaduz (in German)
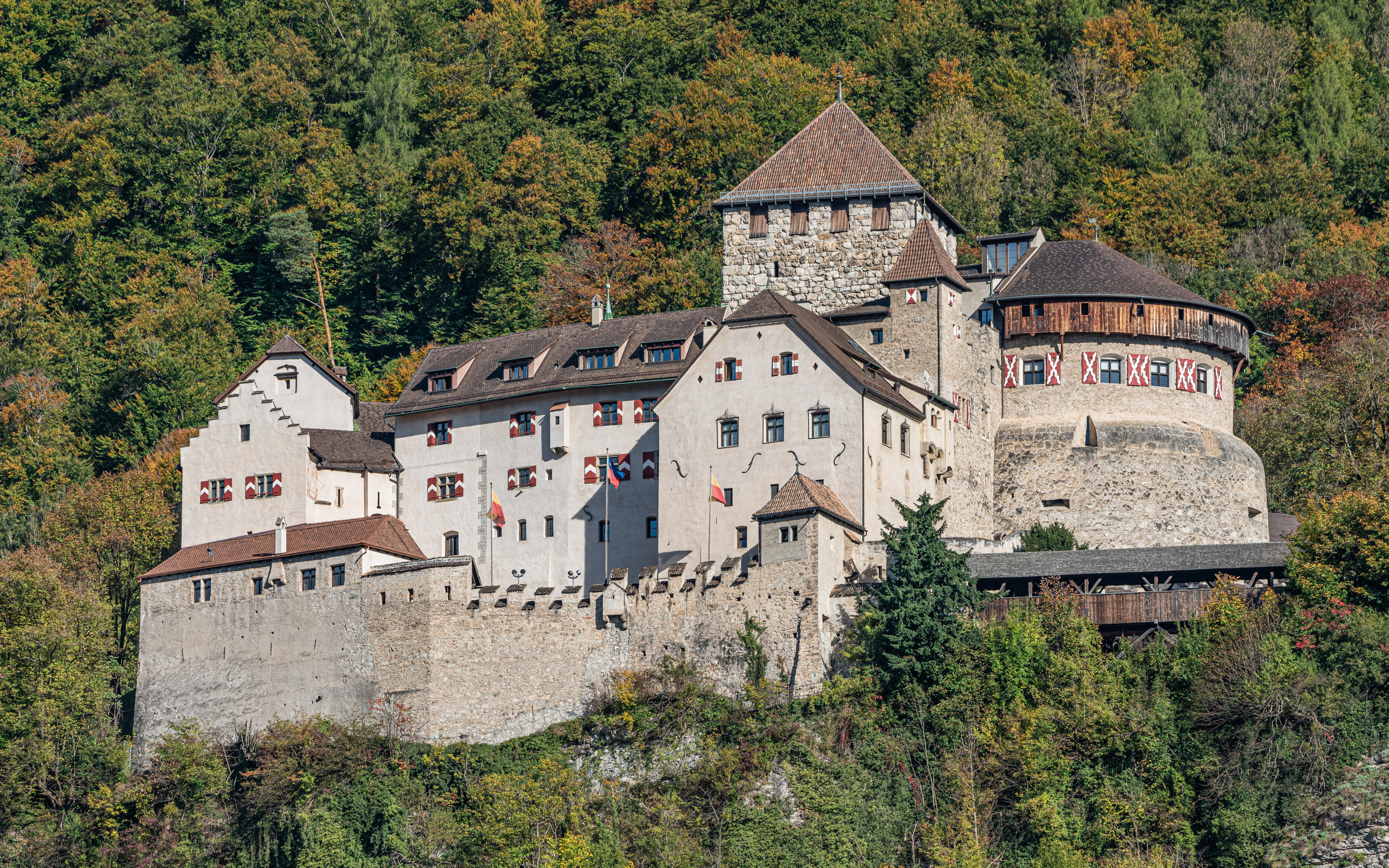
- Vaduz Castle as seen from the capital

- Location within Liechtenstein

General information
- Type: Palace
- Location: Vaduz, Liechtenstein
- Coordinates: 47°08′22″N 9°31′28″E
- Construction started: 12th century
- Owner: Princely Family of Liechtenstein

Vaduz Castle (German: Schloss Vaduz) is the palace and official residence of the Prince of Liechtenstein. The castle gave its name to the town of Vaduz, the capital of Liechtenstein, which it overlooks from an adjacent old hilltop.

== History ==
The counts of Werdenberg-Sargans are presumed to have been the builders of the castle. The bergfried (the keep, built in the 12th century) and parts of the eastern side are the oldest. The tower stands on a piece of ground that is 12 by 13 metres (39 by 43 feet) in area. At the ground floor, the tower walls have a thickness of up to 4 metres (13 feet). The original entrance lay at the courtyard side at a height of 11 metres (36 feet). The chapel of St. Anna was presumably built in the Middle Ages as well. The main altar is late-gothic. In the Swabian War of 1499, the castle was burned by the Swiss Confederacy. The western side was expanded by Count Kaspar von Hohenems (1613–1640).

The princely family of Liechtenstein acquired Vaduz Castle in 1712, when it purchased the countship of Vaduz. At this time, Charles VI, Holy Roman Emperor, combined the countship with the Lordship of Schellenberg, purchased by the Liechtensteins in 1699, to form the present Principality of Liechtenstein.

== Today ==
The castle underwent a major restoration between 1904 and 1920, then again in the early 1920s during the reign of Prince Johann II, and was expanded during the early 1930s by Prince Franz Joseph II. Since 1938, the castle has been the primary residence of Liechtenstein's Princely Family. The castle is not open to the public as the family still lives in the castle.

== Gallery ==
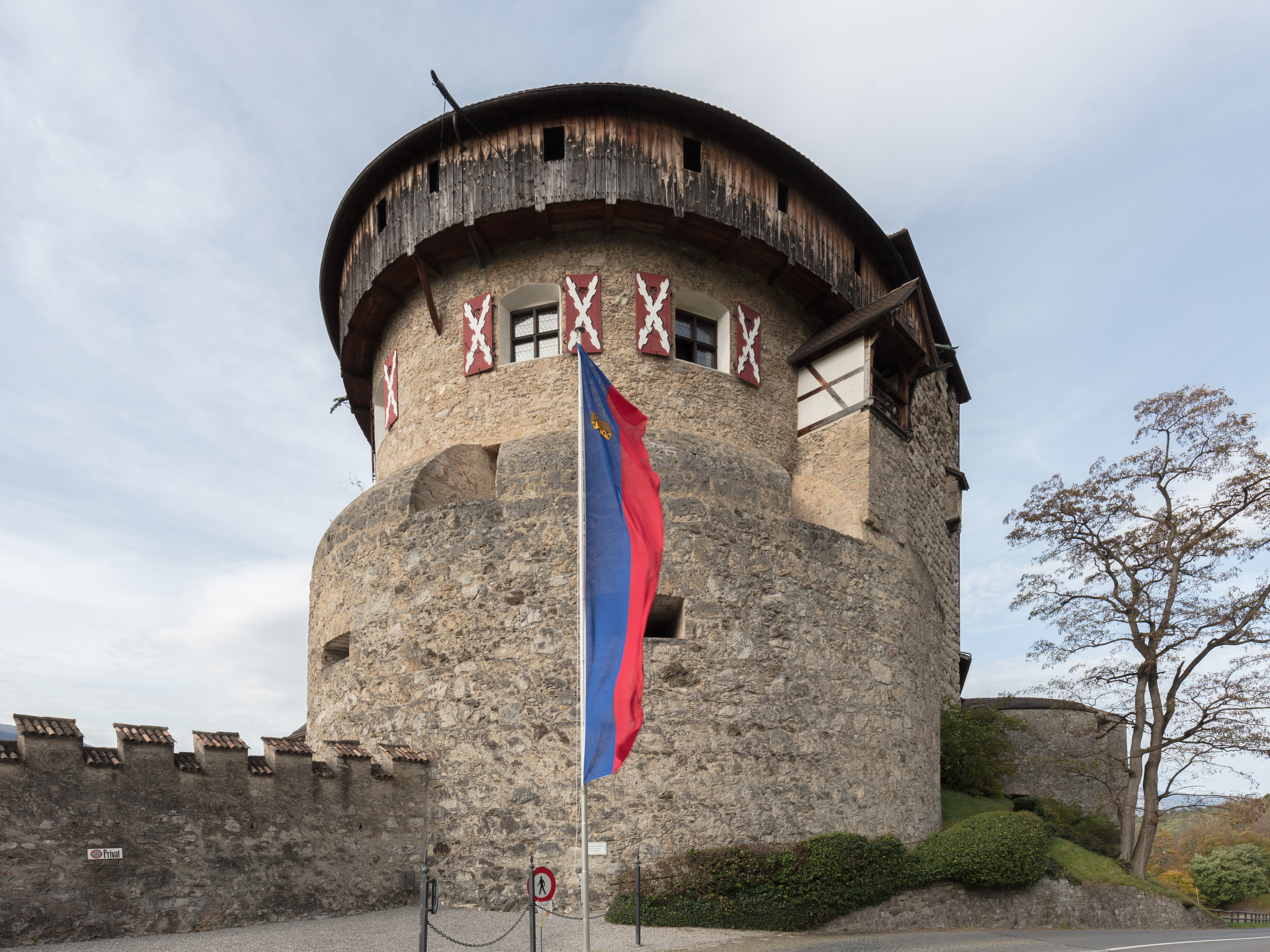
Schloss Vaduz

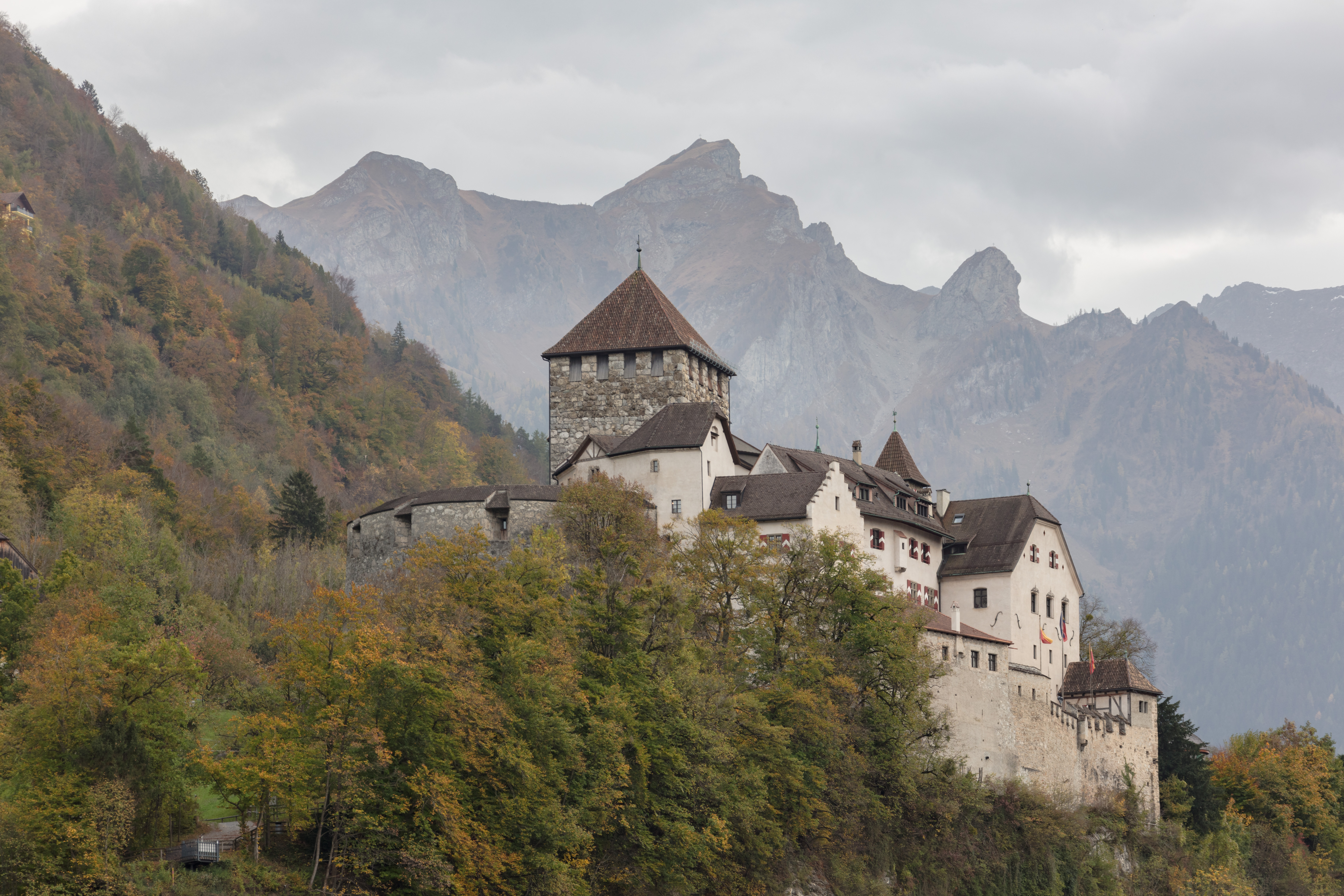
View from north

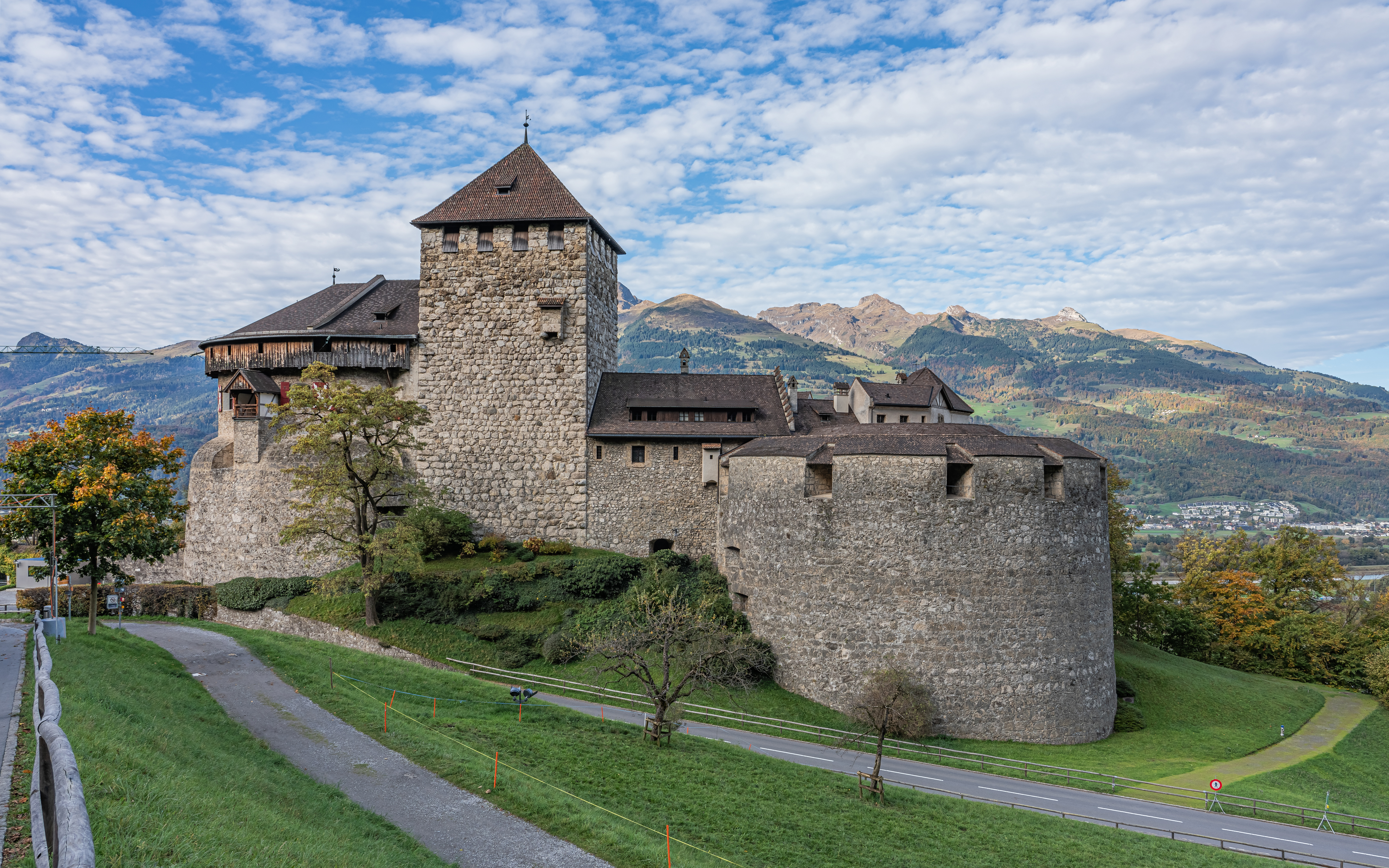
View from east

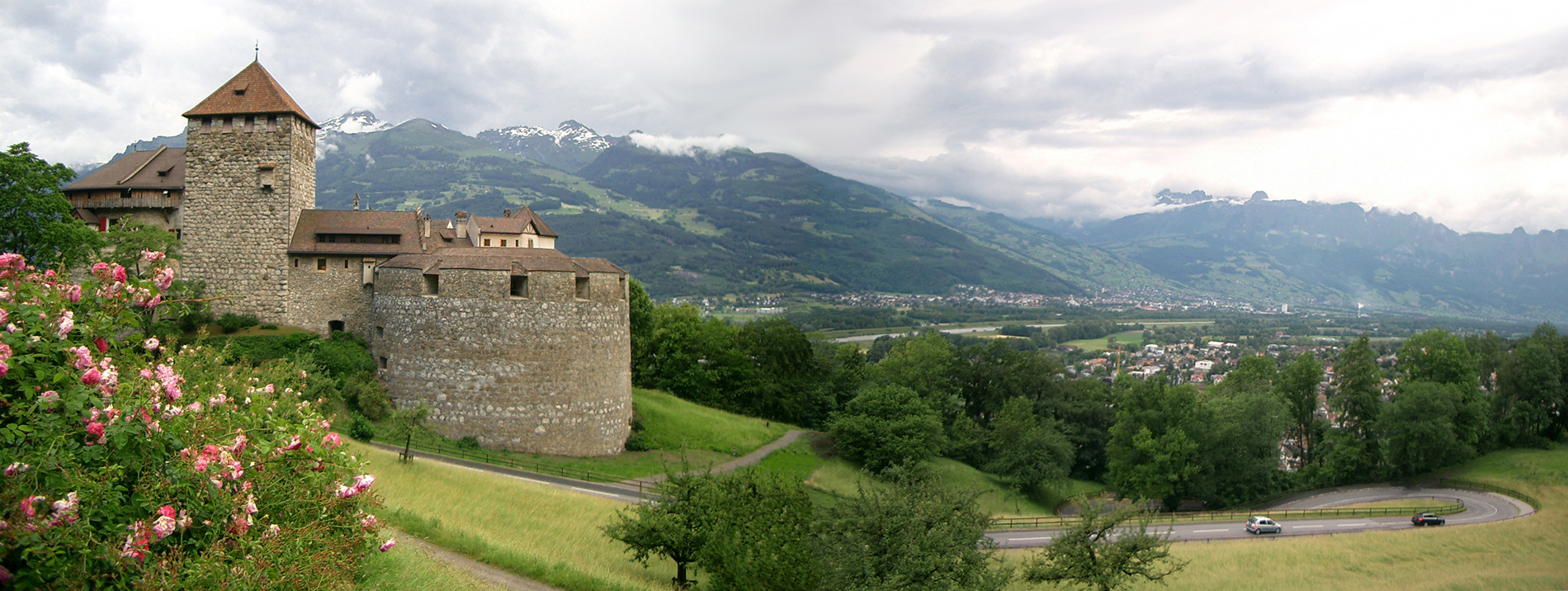
View from the castle

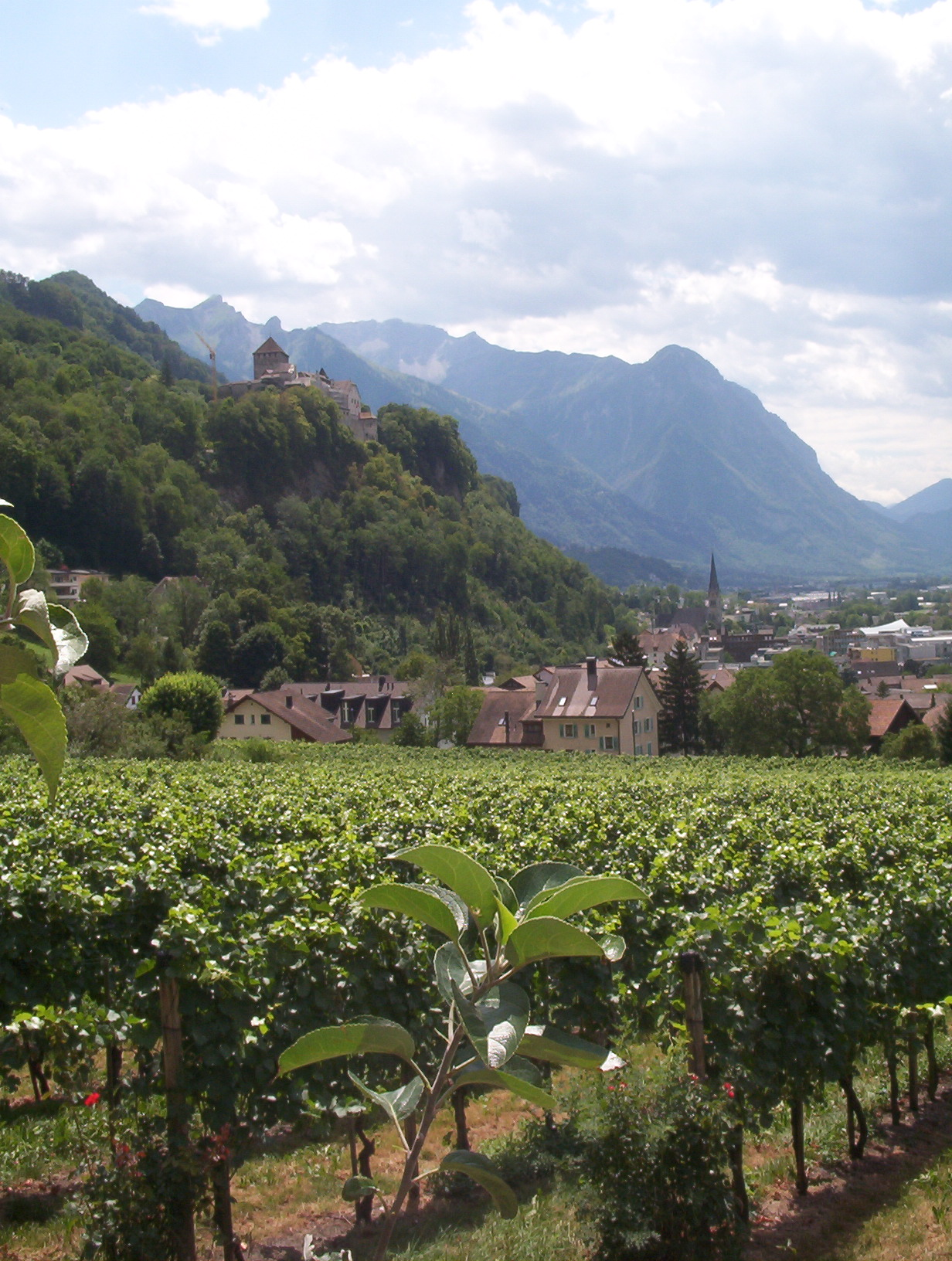
Vaduz Castle and the vineyards of the princely winery

== See also ==
- List of castles in Liechtenstein
- Valtice
