= Mauren =

Mauren Muura
- Municipality
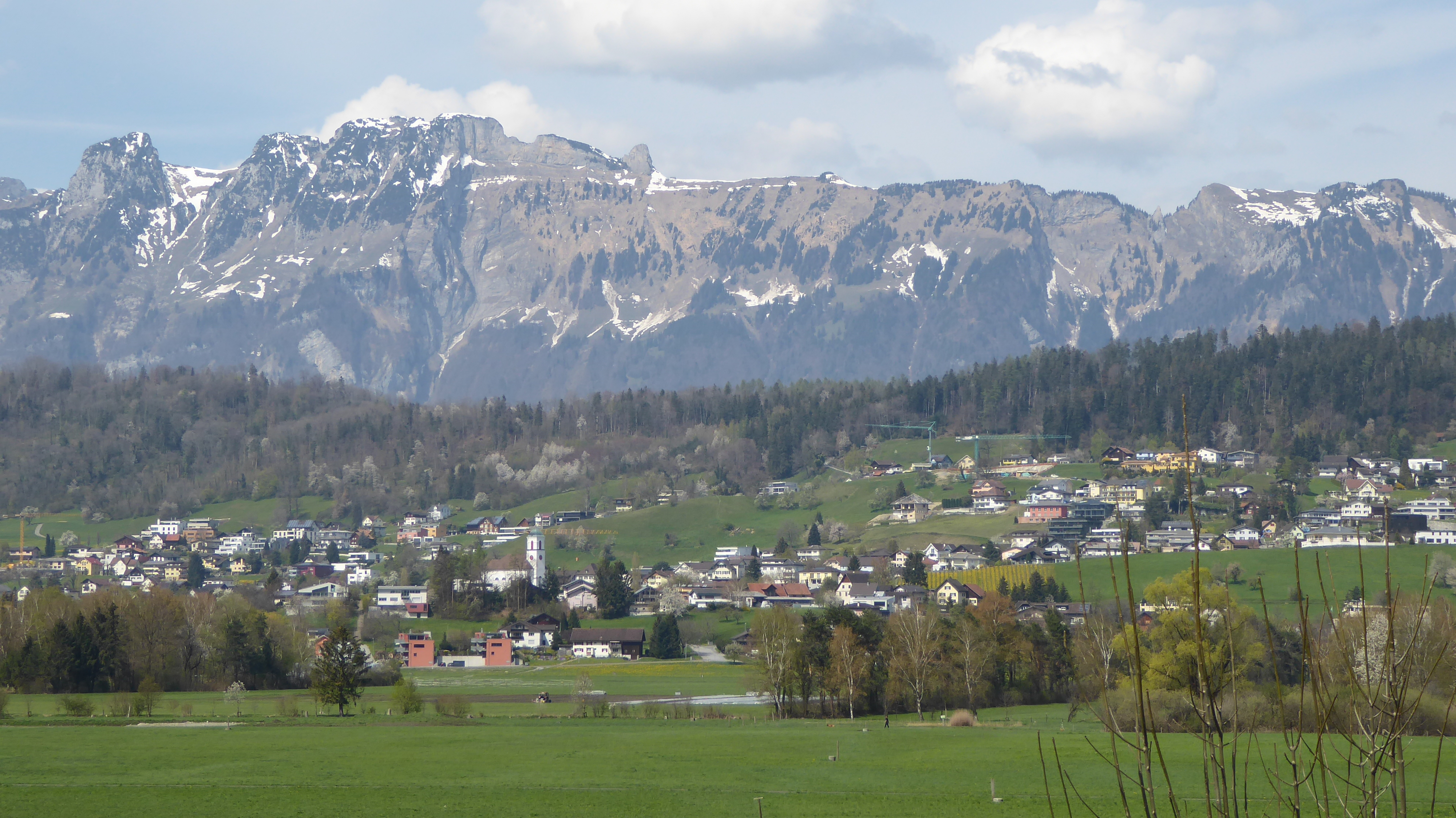
- View of Mauren

- Flag Coat of arms
- Interactive map of Mauren
- Coordinates: 47°13′N 9°32′E
- Country: Liechtenstein
- Electoral district: Unterland
- Villages: Schaanwald

Government
  - Mayor: Peter Frick (VU)

Area
  - Total: 7.49 km^{2} (2.89 sq mi)
- Elevation: 453 m (1,486 ft)

Population (31-12-2019)
  - Total: 4,401
  - Density: 588/km^{2} (1,520/sq mi)
- Time zone: UTC+1 (CET)
  - Summer (DST): CEST
- Postal code: 9493
- Area code: 7008
- ISO 3166 code: LI-04
- Website: www.mauren.li

Mauren (Swiss Standard German pronunciation: [ˈmaʊrən]; High Alemannic: Muura) is a municipality in Liechtenstein that is situated in the north of the country. It has a population of 4,401. The Curta mechanical calculator was produced by Contina AG, in Mauren.

== Geography ==
Mauren borders the Liechtenstein municipalities of Eschen and Schellenberg, as well as the Austrian state of Vorarlberg. The municipality includes the hamlet of Schaanwald, which has the Schaanwald railway station on the Feldkirch-Buchs line. The forests of Bauwald and Maurerberg, east of Schaanwald, take up a third of the municipality's area.

== History ==
During antiquity, a Roman road (from Bregenz to Milan) crossed what is now known as Mauren. The location was already inhabited in these times.

It was first mentioned as "Muron" in documents from 1178. There is a memorial to the Liechtenstein educator and historian Peter Kaiser (1793–1864) located in the municipality.

Since 1905, Mauren has existed as a church community. It was the first municipality in Liechtenstein to receive electricity in 1906.

== Politics ==
Mauren is locally administered by the mayor and a 10-person municipal council, elected every four years since 1975. The incumbent mayor is Peter Frick, since 2023.

=== Last election ===
Party	Votes	%	Seats	+/–
Progressive Citizens' Party	7,143	46.35	6	+1
Patriotic Union	5,845	37.93	3	–1
Democrats for Liechtenstein	1,249	8.11	1	+1
Free List	1,173	7.61	0	–1
Total	15,410	100.00	10	0
Valid votes	1,541	94.48		
Invalid votes	59	3.62		
Blank votes	31	1.90		
Total votes	1,631	100.00		
Registered voters/turnout	2,186	74.61		
Source: Gemeindewahlen

== Notable people ==
- Gebhard Schädler (1776–1842), practising surgeon in Liechtenstein.
- Peter Kaiser (1793–1864), historian and statesman, prominent figure in the 1848 revolution in Liechtenstein.
- Peter Büchel (1872–1958), civil servant and member of the Landtag of Liechtenstein.
- Fritz Kaiser (born 1955), wealth management entrepreneur, investor and philanthropist
- Dominique Hasler (born 1978), Liechtensteiner politician; government councillor from 2017 to 2025 who grew up in Mauren.
- Jürgen Berginz (born 1989), bobsledder who competed for Liechtenstein at the 2010 Winter Olympics.
