= Johann II of Liechtenstein =

Prince of Liechtenstein from 1858 to 1929

Johann II
- Duke of Troppau and Jägerndorf; Count of Rietberg
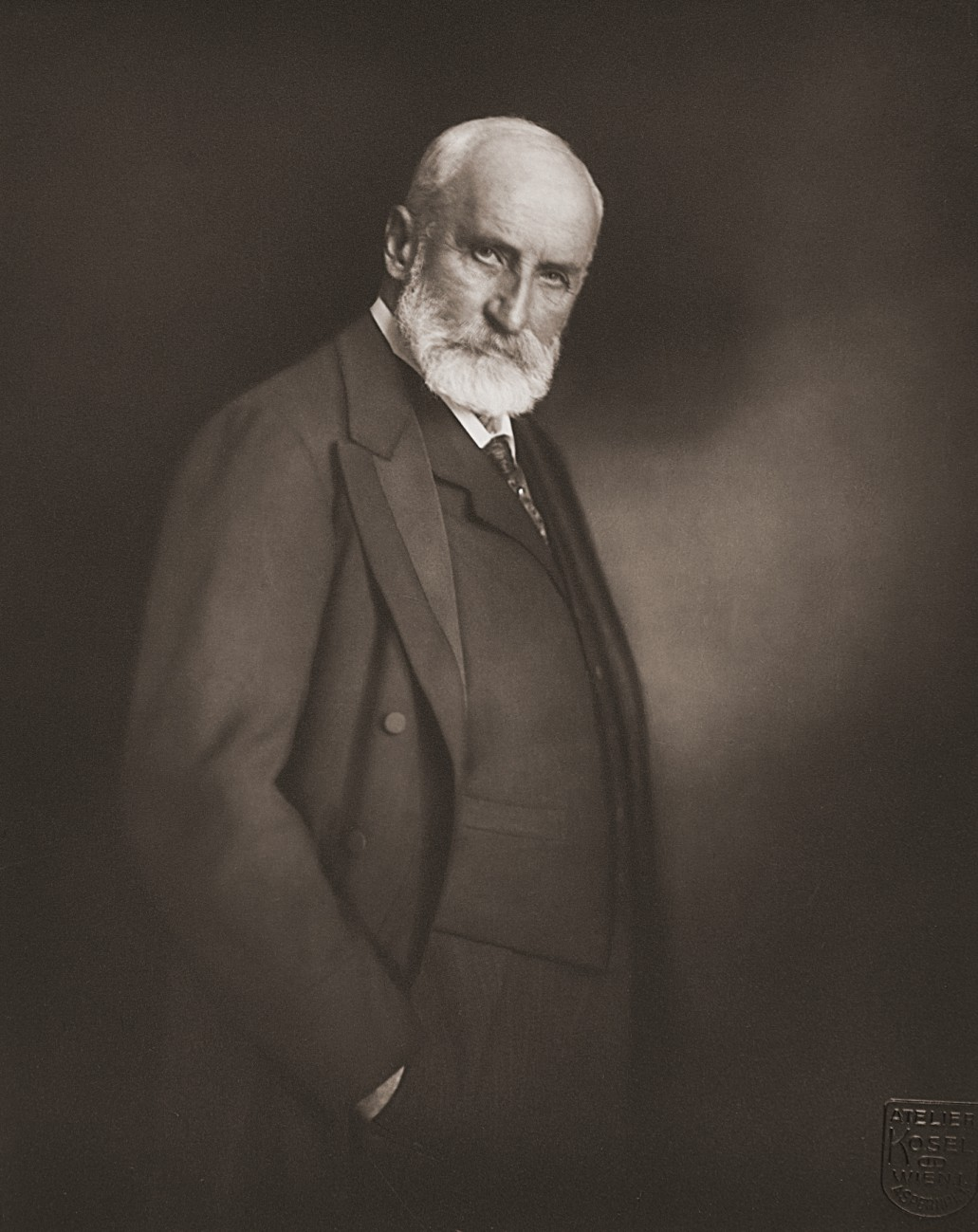
- Formal portrait, 1928

Prince of Liechtenstein
- Reign: 12 November 1858 – 11 February 1929
- Predecessor: Aloys II
- Successor: Franz I
- Prime Ministers: See list: Karl Freiherr Haus von Hausen Carl von In der Maur Friedrich Stellwag von Carion Leopold Freiherr von Imhof Martin Ritter Prince Karl Aloys of Liechtenstein Josef Peer Josef Ospelt Gustav Schädler Josef Hoop
- Born: 5 October 1840; Eisgrub, Margraviate of Moravia, Austrian Empire
- Died: 11 February 1929 (aged 88); Valtice, First Czechoslovak Republic
- Burial: Church of the Nativity of the Virgin Mary, Vranov
Names
- Johann Maria Franz Placidus
- House: Liechtenstein
- Father: Aloys II, Prince of Liechtenstein
- Mother: Countess Franziska Kinsky of Wchinitz and Tettau
- Religion: Roman Catholic

Johann II (Johann Maria Franz Placidus; 5 October 1840 – 11 February 1929), nicknamed the Good (German: Der Gute), was Prince of Liechtenstein from 12 November 1858 until his death in 1929.

His reign of 70 years and 91 days is the third-longest of any sovereign monarch in European history, after those of King Louis XIV and Queen Elizabeth II respectively, and fourth-longest overall for which exact dates are known (after King Louis, Queen Elizabeth, and King Bhumibol Adulyadej respectively).

== Early life ==
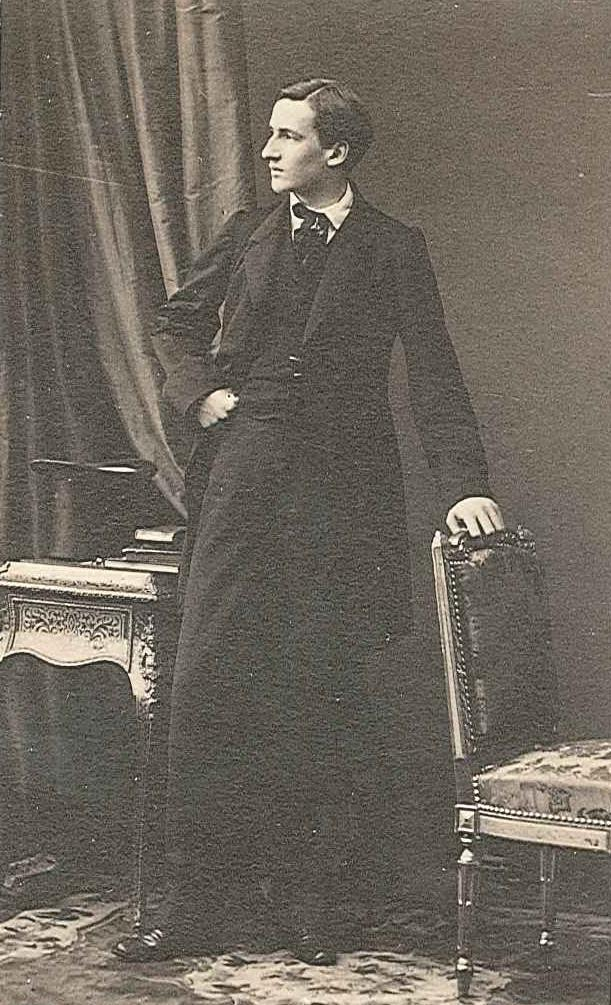
Formal portrait, 1870

Johann II was the elder son of Aloys II, Prince of Liechtenstein and Countess Franziska Kinsky of Wchinitz and Tettau. He ascended to the throne shortly after his 18th birthday. Until he was surpassed by Elizabeth II on 9 May 2022, his reign had been the longest precisely documented tenure of any European monarch since antiquity in which a regent (that is, a regent serving in place of an underage sovereign) was never employed. Although his mother acted as his regent from 10 February 1859 to November 1860, she was not the regent for a minor, but was appointed by her son to fulfil his duties because he wished to finish his education before he began his rule.

== Law and reform ==
In 1862, Johann II issued Liechtenstein's first constitution, which was heavily influenced by the likes of Vorarlberg. After World War I and due to significant popular demand, Johann II granted a new constitution, which was ratified on 5 October 1921. It granted considerable political rights to common Liechtensteiners and made the principality a constitutional monarchy. The constitution has survived but with revisions, most notably in 2003.

== Foreign affairs ==
Liechtenstein left the German Confederation in 1866. Not long afterward, the Liechtenstein Army was abolished as it was regarded as an unnecessary expense.

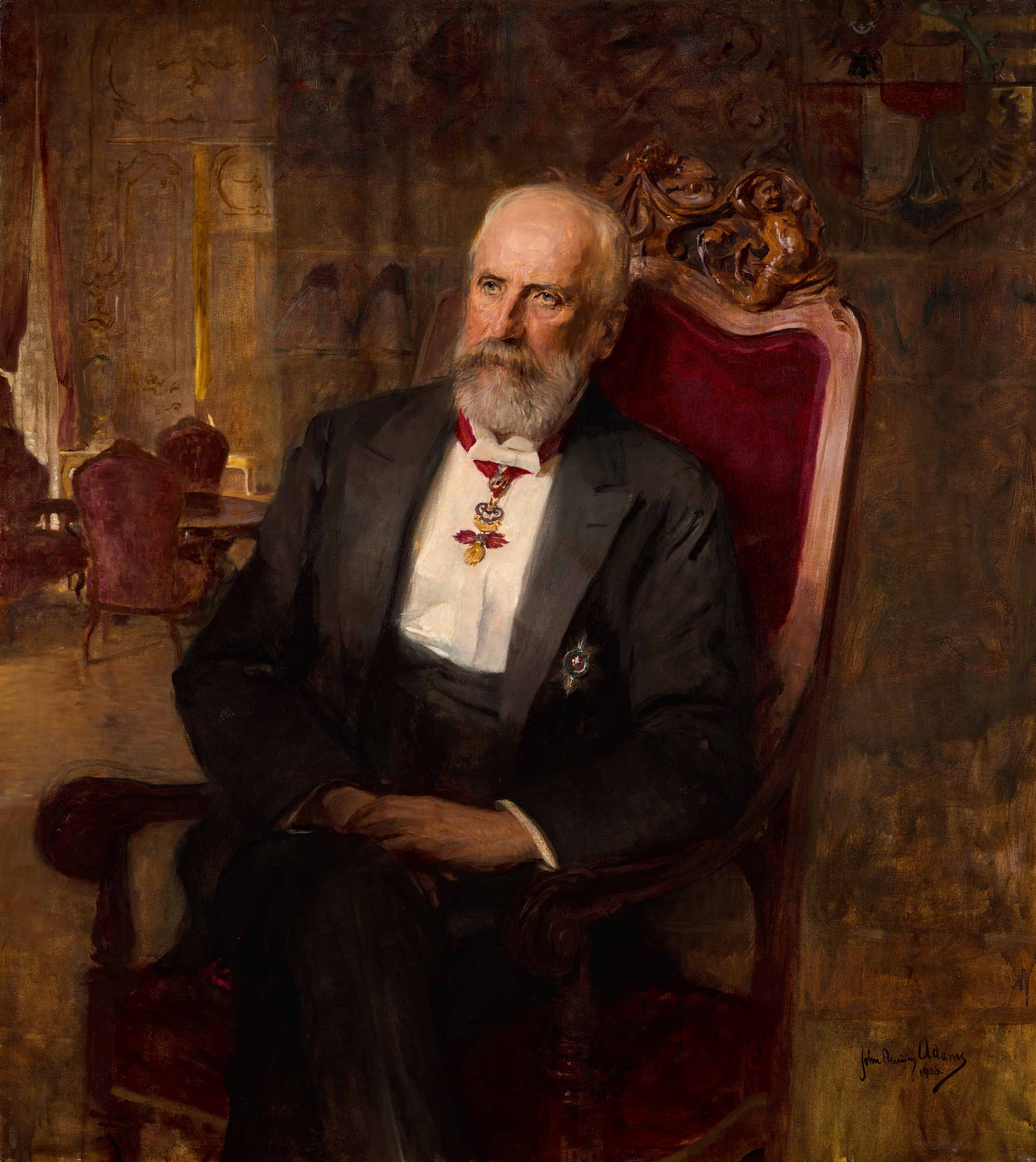
Portrait by John Quincy Adams, 1908

In 1867, Alexander II of Russia had offered Johann the purchase of Russian Alaska, but he refused as he believed the territory was useless.

Johann II somewhat cooled relations with Liechtenstein's traditional ally, Austria-Hungary and its successor states, to forge closer relations with Switzerland, particularly after World War I. Liechtenstein was neutral during the war, which broke Liechtenstein's alliance with Austria-Hungary and led it to go into a customs union with Switzerland. In 1924, late in Johann's reign, the Swiss franc became Liechtenstein's official currency.

== Patron of arts ==
Johann II, an outstanding art connoisseur and a generous patron, added much to the Liechtenstein Princely Collections. Although considered a prominent patron of the arts and sciences during his long reign, Johann II was also considered to be rather unsociable and did not participate in social events. Rarely did he show up in his magnificent Vienna residences, Liechtenstein City Palace and Liechtenstein Garden Palace. He also never assumed any tasks in Austrian politics or the Austrian military, and he never married or had any children like several other members of his family.

From 1884, he rebuilt Liechtenstein Castle, the ancestral seat of his family near Vienna, which had fallen into ruins. Between 1905 and 1920, Schloss Vaduz was renovated and expanded. Like all of his ancestors he never lived in the principality of Liechtenstein, but on the vast Austrian and Moravian estates of the House of Liechtenstein which were 7.5 times the total area of the Principality itself. His main homes were the castles of Lednice and Valtice (German names: Eisgrub and Feldsberg) in what is today the Czech Republic (then part of Austria-Hungary with the Austrian-Bohemian border running through the park between the two castles). The local administration of the Principality was overseen by a governor, and the government office was located at the prince's seat. It was not until the German occupation of the Czech lands at the beginning of World War II that the residence was moved to Vaduz.

== Declining health and death ==
As Johann entered his later years, his eyesight began to decline rapidly and on 12 November 1928, he underwent surgery to remove cataracts. He died on 11 February 1929 and was succeeded by his younger brother Franz I.

== Honours ==
- Grand Cross of the Royal Guelphic Order, 1860 (Kingdom of Hanover)
- Knight of the Golden Fleece, 1862 (Austrian Empire)
- Grand Cross of St. Stephen, 1896 (Austria-Hungary)
- Knight of St. Hubert, 1882 (Kingdom of Bavaria)
- Bailiff Grand Cross of Honour and Devotion (Sovereign Military Order of Malta)

Johann II of Liechtenstein House of Liechtenstein Born: 5 October 1840 Died: 11 February 1929
Regnal titles
Preceded by Aloys II	Prince of Liechtenstein; 1858–1929	Succeeded by Franz I
