= List of presidents of the Landtag of Liechtenstein =

The Landtagspräsident (lit. 'President of the state parliament') is the speaker of the Landtag of Liechtenstein. The president is responsible for calling meetings and representing the Landtag externally. In addition, they are a member of the five-member state committee that assumes the duties of the body when it is not in session. The members of the Landtag elect the president and vice president at the opening session of every year.

The position of president was created upon the establishment of the Landtag by the 1862 Constitution of Liechtenstein, with Karl Schädler being elected as the first president on 10 December 1862. The incumbent president has been Manfred Kaufmann, since 10 April 2025.

== Presidents of the Landtag (1862–present) ==
No. (Note: People are numbered according to periods served by the same person. For example, David Strub served as president three times in two non-consecutive terms, but is counted only once.)	Portrait	Name (Birth–Death)	Tenure			Party	References
No.	Portrait	Name (Birth–Death)	Took office	Left office	Duration	Party	References
1		Karl Schädler (1804–1889)	10 December 1862	27 May 1871	8 years, 168 days	Independent	
2		Wilhelm Schlegel (1828–1900)	1871	18 November 1877		Independent	
3		Rudolf Schädler (1845–1930)	18 November 1877	8 June 1878	4 years, 205 days	Independent	
(2)		Wilhelm Schlegel (1828–1900)	8 June 1878	25 May 1882	3 years, 351 days	Independent	
3		Albert Schädler (1848–1922)	25 May 1882	24 May 1886	3 years, 364 days	Independent	
(2)		Wilhelm Schlegel (1828–1900)	24 May 1886	6 June 1890	4 years, 13 days	Independent	
(3)		Albert Schädler (1848–1922)	6 June 1890	30 March 1919	28 years, 297 days	Independent	
4		Fritz Walser (1870–1950)	25 November 1919	2 March 1922	2 years, 97 days	Progressive Citizens' Party	
5		Wilhelm Beck (1885–1936)	2 March 1922	4 August 1928	6 years, 155 days	Christian-Social People's Party	
6		Anton Frommelt (1895–1975)	4 August 1928	12 May 1945	16 years, 281 days	Progressive Citizens' Party	
7		David Strub (1897–1985)	12 May 1945	22 March 1954	8 years, 314 days	Progressive Citizens' Party	
8		Alois Ritter (1897–1966)	22 March 1954	4 April 1955	1 year, 13 days	Patriotic Union	
(7)		David Strub (1897–1985)	4 April 1955	20 March 1956	351 days	Progressive Citizens' Party	
(8)		Alois Ritter (1897–1966)	20 March 1956	18 March 1957	363 days	Patriotic Union	
(7)		David Strub (1897–1985)	18 March 1957	12 November 1957	239 days	Progressive Citizens' Party	
9		Josef Hoop (1895–1959)	12 November 1957	19 October 1959 †	1 year, 341 days	Progressive Citizens' Party	
10		Martin Risch (1899–1970)	28 March 1960	6 May 1966	6 years, 39 days	Progressive Citizens' Party	
11		Alexander Frick (1910–1991)	6 May 1966	13 March 1970	3 years, 311 days	Progressive Citizens' Party	
12		Karlheinz Ritter (1929–2008)	13 March 1970	27 March 1974	4 years, 14 days	Patriotic Union	
13		Gerard Batliner (1928–2008)	27 March 1974	21 April 1978	4 years, 25 days	Progressive Citizens' Party	
(12)		Karlheinz Ritter (1929–2008)	21 April 1978	12 May 1993	15 years, 21 days	Patriotic Union	
14		Ernst Walch (born 1956)	12 May 1993	7 November 1993	179 days	Progressive Citizens' Party	
15		Paul Kindle (1930–2016)	7 November 1993	15 February 1995	1 year, 100 days	Patriotic Union	
16		Otmar Hasler (born 1953)	15 February 1995	15 March 1996	1 year, 29 days	Progressive Citizens' Party	
(15)		Paul Kindle (1930–2016)	15 March 1996	14 March 1997	364 days	Patriotic Union	
17		Peter Wolff (born 1946)	14 March 1997	29 March 2001	4 years, 15 days	Patriotic Union	
18		Klaus Wanger (1941–2026)	29 March 2001	25 March 2009	7 years, 360 days	Progressive Citizens' Party	
19		Arthur Brunhart (born 1952)	25 March 2009	27 March 2013	4 years, 3 days	Patriotic Union	
20		Albert Frick (born 1948)	27 March 2013	10 April 2025	12 years, 14 days	Progressive Citizens' Party	
21		Manfred Kaufmann (born 1978)	10 April 2025	Incumbent	1 year, 203 days	Patriotic Union	

== See also ==
- Landtag of Liechtenstein
- List of Liechtenstein general elections
- List of heads of government of Liechtenstein
