= History of Liechtenstein =

Arms of Liechtenstein

Political identity came to the territory now occupied by the Principality of Liechtenstein in 814, with the formation of the subcountry of Lower Rhætia. Liechtenstein's borders have remained unchanged since 1434, when the Rhine established the border between the Holy Roman Empire and the Swiss cantons.

== Antiquity ==
The area that is now Liechtenstein was part of the Roman province of Rhaetia. A Roman road crossed the region from south to north, traversing the Alps by the Splügen Pass and, following the right bank of the Rhine at the edge of the floodplain, was uninhabited for long lengths of time because of periodic flooding. Roman villas have been excavated in Schaanwald and Nendeln. The late Roman influx of the Alemanni from the north is memorialized by the remains of a Roman fort at Schaan.

== Middle Ages ==
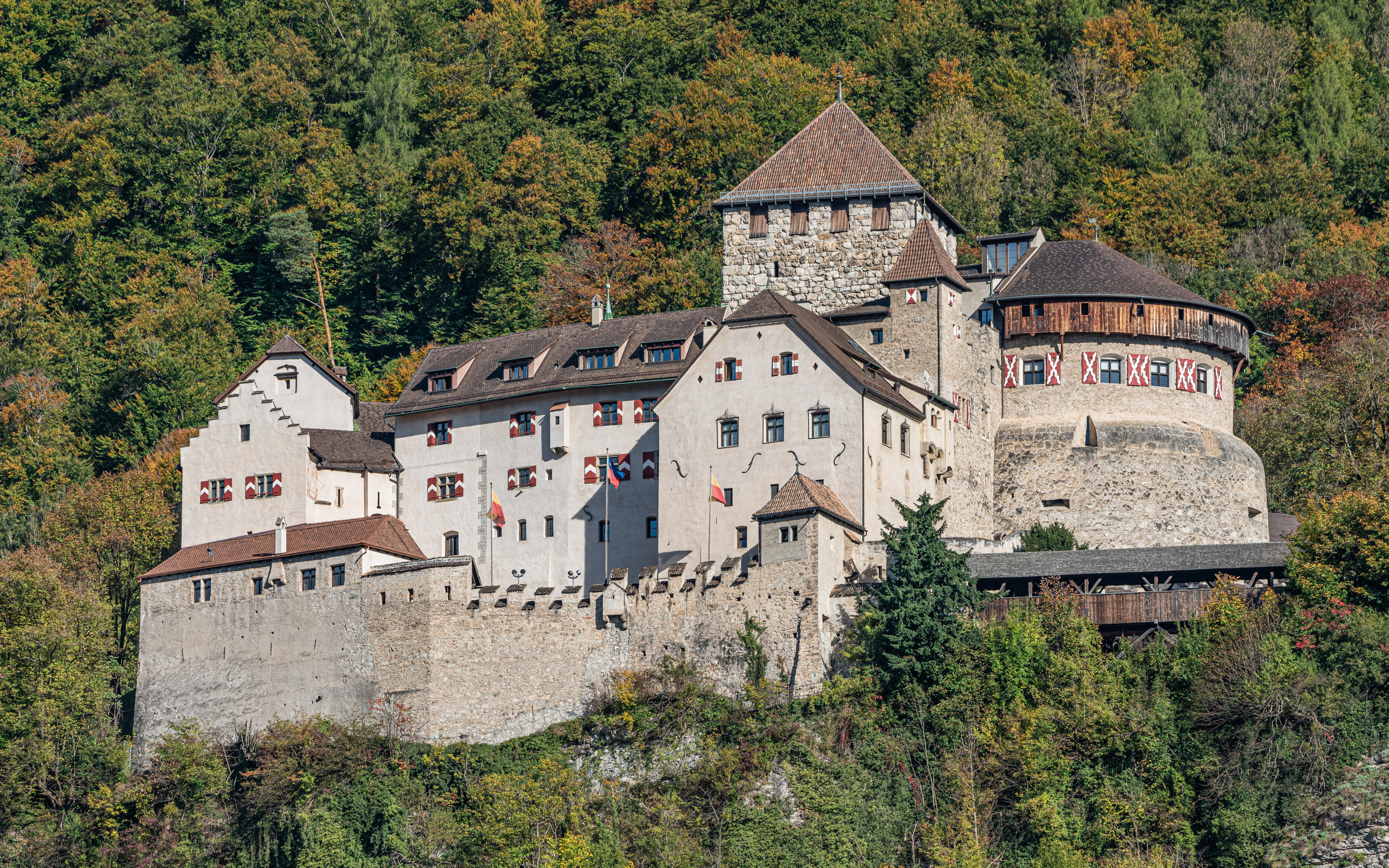
Vaduz Castle, built during the Middle Ages

The area, part of Raetia, was incorporated into the Carolingian Empire, and divided into countships, which became subdivided over the generations. Because the Duchy of Swabia lost its duke in 1268 and was never restored, all vassals of the duchy became immediate vassals of the Imperial Throne (as has happened in much of Westphalia when the duchy of Saxony was divided and partially dissolved in the aftermath of the defeat of Henry the Lion). Until about 1100, the predominant language of the area was Romansch, but thereafter German gained ground, and in 1300 an Alemannic population called the Walsers (originating in Valais) entered the region. In the 21st century, the mountain village of Triesenberg still preserves features of Walser dialect.

The medieval County of Vaduz was formed in 1342 as a small subdivision of the Werdenberg county of the dynasty of Montfort of Vorarlberg. The 15th century brought three wars and some devastation. Centuries later, Carl Alexander Heideloff built Lichtenstein Castle (with the help of peasants). However, the 17th century was a low point. The area that was to become Liechtenstein was invaded by both Austrian and Swedish troops during the Thirty Years' War of 1618–1648. During the 17th century the country was afflicted by a plague and also by the witch trials, in which more than 100 people were persecuted and executed.

The House of Liechtenstein, which would later form the modern principality, derives its name from the Liechtenstein Castle in Lower Austria, built in the 12th century. The heads of the Liechtenstein family were often subservient and acted as advisors to the Holy Roman Emperor, which allowed them to obtain lands mostly in Moravia, Lower Austria and Styria over the centuries. Karl of Liechtenstein was the Obersthofmeister in the court of Rudolf II, a position which he held until 1607. However, during the dispute between Rudolf and his brother Matthias, Karl sided with Matthias. In return, Matthias, now Archduke of Austria, elevated the House of Liechtenstein to hereditary prince status on 20 December 1608, thus making Karl the first sovereign Prince of Liechtenstein as Karl I.

During the Bohemian Revolt (1618–1620), the house of Liechtenstein lost most of its possessions in Moravia. Karl I and his brother Maximilian played a leading role in the Battle of White Mountain in November 1620, when the following year Karl I conducted the trials and executions of the revolt leaders on behalf of Ferdinand II. In exchange for their services, Ferdinand II again elevated Karl I, along with his brothers Maximillian and Gundaker, to Imperial prince along with granting the family numerous estates in Moravia and Silesia. In 1622, the House of Liechtenstein purchased the lands of Mährisch Kromau and Ungarisch Ostra. In 1633, the two areas were bestowed the name of the Principality of Liechtenstein by Ferdinand II, though this name largely fell out of use by 1647.

== Early modern era ==
Prince Johann Adam Andreas of Liechtenstein bought the Lordship of Schellenberg in 1699 and the County of Vaduz in 1712. This Prince of Liechtenstein had wide landholdings in Austria, Bohemia and Moravia, but none of his lands were held directly from the Emperor. Thus, the prince was barred from entry to the Imperial Diet and the prestige and influence that would entail.

By acquiring the Lordships of Schellenberg and Vaduz, modest areas of mountain villages, each of which was directly subordinate to the Emperor because there was no longer a Duke of Swabia, the Prince of Liechtenstein achieved his goal. The territory took the name of the family which now ruled it. On 23 January 1719, Charles VI, Holy Roman Emperor, decreed that the counties of Vaduz and Schellenberg be promoted to a principality with the name Liechtenstein for his servant Anton Florian of Liechtenstein whereby he and his successors became Princes of the Holy Roman Empire.

The prince never visited his principality, and the first visit of a sovereign prince to Liechtenstein did not occur until 1842. Instead, they were represented by the local district office based in Vaduz, consisting of a number of officials, which was regulated by civil service law. It served as the only form of administration in the country until its disbandment in 1848, and was primarily responsible for controlling the country's tax office and reporting significant developments to the prince, who resided in Vienna. Until the end of the 17th century, officials were primarily recruited from neighbouring Vorarlberg, and were paid directly by the prince.

== Nineteenth century ==
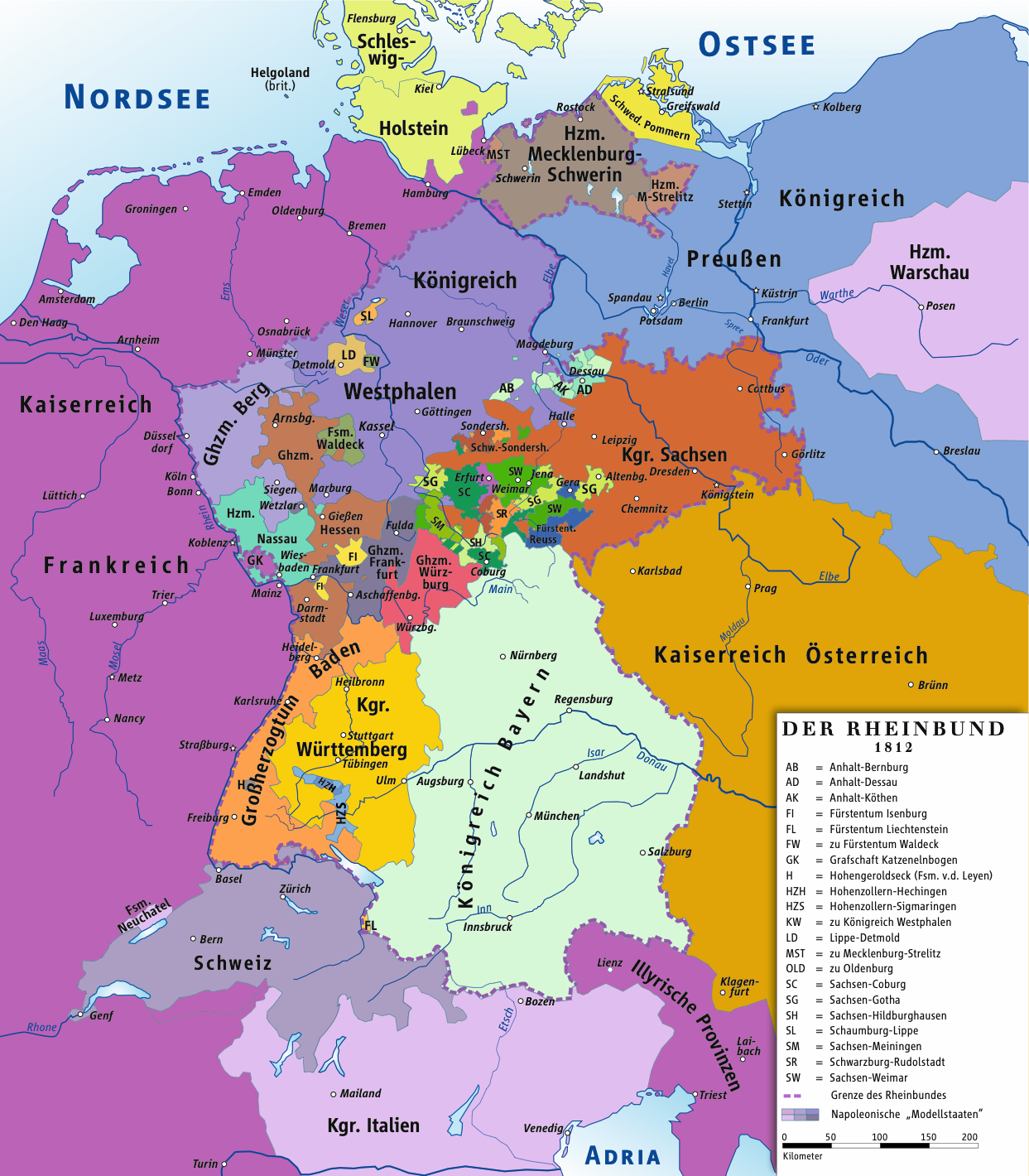
A map of the Confederation of the Rhine.

=== French revolutionary and Napoleonic wars ===
In the War of the First Coalition, Liechtenstein, as part of the Holy Roman Empire contributed approximately 20 troops to the coalition forces from 1793 to 1796. During the War of the Second Coalition, France invaded the country on 6 March 1799 and plundered several towns, including Nendeln which was burned by French troops resulting in the deaths of four people. The Austrian and Vorarlberg state militias under command of Lieutenant field marshal Franjo Jelačić defeated 18,000 French troops stationed in Liechtenstein under command of General André Masséna and liberated the country by 14 May.

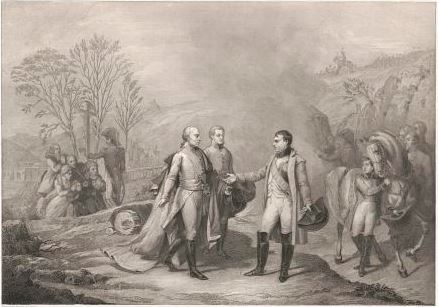
Johann I with Francis II and Napoleon following the Battle of Austerlitz, 5 December 1805.

In 1806, Liechtenstein was one of the principalities and counties Maximilian I of Bavaria wanted to annex as his price for joining the Confederation of the Rhine but Napoleon refused because he had appreciated the personal qualities of Johann I, Austria's envoy during the negotiations leading to the Treaty of Pressburg, as a negotiator. Thus Liechtenstein became a sovereign state later that year when it joined Napoleon's Confederation of the Rhine upon the dissolution of the Holy Roman Empire.

The French under Napoleon occupied the principality for a few years, but Liechtenstein regained its independence in 1815. Soon afterward, Liechtenstein joined the German Confederation (20 June 1815 – 24 August 1866, which was presided over by the Emperor of Austria). In 1818, Johann I granted a constitution, although it was limited in its nature. 1818 also saw the first visit of a member of the House of Liechtenstein, Prince Alois. However, the first visit by a sovereign prince did not occur until 1842.

In 1833, Michael Menzinger applied for the role of Landvogt. The role originated from the 16th century and functioned as the head of the district office (Oberamt), subordinate to the court of the House of Liechtenstein. It was previously an undesired role within the court, but Menzinger applying for the role changed this. For this reason, he is considered the first governor of Liechtenstein.

=== Constitution and latter century ===
Like most of Europe at the time, Liechtenstein was subject to the German revolutions of 1848–1849 which caused increased opposition to the absolute monarchy of Aloys II. The aim of the revolution was to improve the economic and political situation of ordinary citizens in Liechtenstein, primarily fuelled by the worsening economy in the country in the years prior. On 22 March 1848, the people's committee appointed a three-person committee to lead the Liechtenstein revolutionary movement, which included Peter Kaiser, Karl Schädler and Ludwig Grass. Together, they managed to maintain order in Liechtenstein and formed a constitutional council. Liechtenstein was a member of the National Assembly in Frankfurt until April 1849.

Following the revolution, a constitutional council was elected on 27 July 1848 in response to popular demand from the revolutionaries, of which Schädler was elected as its president. The primary task of the council was to create the draft for a new Liechtenstein constitution, the work of which was done primarily by him and Michael Menzinger. As a concession towards the revolution, the district office was disbanded and replaced by a District Council that was formed on 7 March 1849 with 24 elected representatives and which acted as the first democratic representation in Liechtenstein, with Schädler elected as District Administrator. In addition, the title of Landvogt was changed to governor (Landesverweser) with Menzinger continuing in the role.

After the failure of the German revolutions, Aloys II once again regained absolute power over Liechtenstein on 20 July 1852 and disbanded the District Council. However, calls for a new constitution once again appeared early in the reign of Johann II. Karl Schädler formed the constitutional council anew, leading it, and drafted the majority of another new constitution. The draft was reviewed by an unknown German legal expert and formed the basis of the 1862 Constitution of Liechtenstein, which was ratified on 26 September. It was heavily inspired by the constitution of Vorarlberg and largely addressed the demands of the revolutionaries in Liechtenstein. This constitution established civil liberties in the country and formed the Landtag of Liechtenstein for the first time.

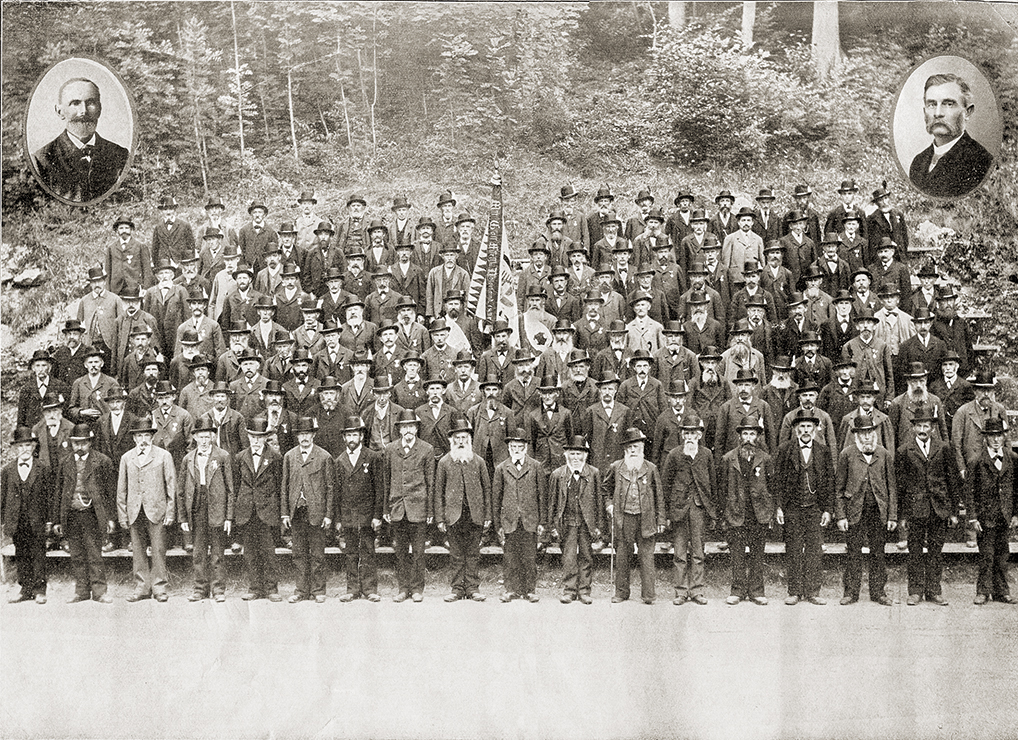
The Liechtenstein veterans association in 1896, showing the remaining soldiers of the army that was disestablished in 1868.

During the Austro-Prussian War of 1866, Prince Johann II placed his soldiers at the disposal of the Confederation but only to “defend the German territory of Tyrol”. However, the Landtag had not been consulted regarding the deployment and the war was unpopular among the population, as such it faced resistance from the Landtag. As a result, Johann II promised a loan to the country and refused to have his men fight against other Germans. The Liechtenstein contingent took up position on the Stilfser Joch under the command of Peter Rheinberger in the south of Liechtenstein to defend the Liechtenstein/Austrian border against attacks by the Italians under Garibaldi. A reserve of 20 men remained in Liechtenstein at Vaduz Castle. When the war ended on 22 July, the army of Liechtenstein marched home to a ceremonial welcome in Vaduz. Popular legend claims that 80 men went to war, but 81 came back. It is disputed who the additional person was; an Austrian liaison officer may have joined up with the contingent on the way back, but it has also been claimed that the man was an Italian farmer.

The German Confederation was dissolved in 1866. Together with its unpopularity among the population and the rising cost to maintain it, Liechtenstein disbanded its army of 80 men on 12 February 1868 and declared its permanent neutrality, neither joining the new German Empire in 1871, nor the Austrian Empire. In 1893, former soldiers of the Liechtenstein army founded a veterans association, which had 141 members in 1896. Its last surviving member, Andreas Kieber, died in 1939, aged 94 years old. This neutrality was respected during both World Wars, and ultimately would allow the country to avoid the fate of the other German monarchies.

== Liechtenstein during the world wars ==
=== World War I ===
Liechtenstein did not participate in World War I, claiming neutrality. However, until the end of the war, it was closely tied to Austria-Hungary due to the customs union between the two countries and was sympathetic to the Central Powers. The majority of the Liechtenstein government did not expect the war to last long, thus no food or economic preparations were made for it. At the outbreak of the war France, Russia and the United Kingdom interned Liechtensteiners and partially confiscated their assets. As a result, the Liechtenstein government made various declarations that the principality was neutral and a separate entity from Austria-Hungary.

From September, food deliveries from Austria-Hungary, which Liechtenstein relied on, began to decrease. This quickly reduced the initial level of support for the war. In addition, Switzerland was pressured by Britain and France to end its food exports to Liechtenstein due to the latter's close ties to Austria-Hungary. In response, the Liechtenstein government, led by Leopold Freiherr von Imhof, issued emergency commissions throughout the country on 14 December 1914. These commissions aimed to manage the procurement of food and raw materials, now in short supply, and to distribute them to the population.

Foreign citizens living in Liechtenstein were conscripted into the armies of their respective home countries, primarily Austria-Hungary and Germany, of which 27 did not return. In addition, many Liechtensteiners also voluntarily enlisted in both armies, including several members of the house of Liechtenstein. In total, 4 Liechtenstein citizens are known to have been killed in the war despite the country being neutral, including Prince Heinrich of Liechtenstein, who is the highest member of the house of Liechtenstein to have been killed in action. Three Liechtensteiners were imprisoned for espionage during the war.

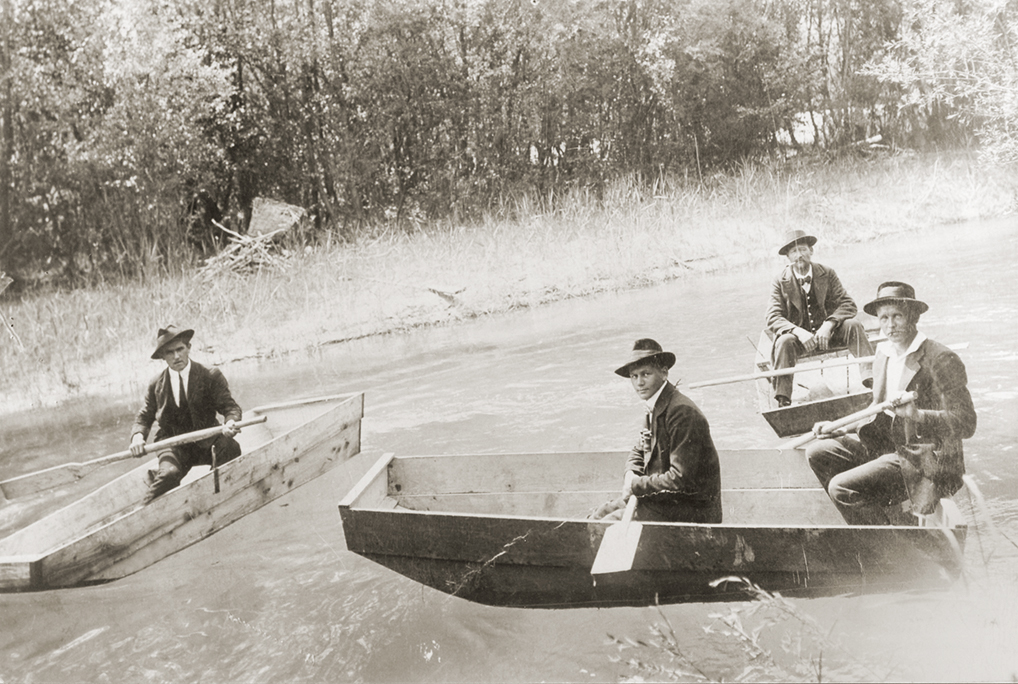
A group of Liechtensteiner smugglers on pontoons, 1916.

The Entente powers imposed an economic embargo on Liechtenstein in 1916. The country faced economic devastation and food shortages as a result due to the lack of natural resources, which increased smuggling within the country significantly and forced the country to reduce its reliance on Austria-Hungary and seek closer economic ties with Switzerland. By 1916 all food deliveries from Austria-Hungary had ceased, which forced Liechtenstein to seek closer ties with Switzerland in order to ensure food deliveries continued.

As the war dragged on, the country faced increasing civil unrest and dissatisfaction, particularly towards to the government of Leopold Freiherr von Imhof. Figures such as Wilhelm Beck formed an opposition group against him, and in November 1918 he was subject of a de facto coup d'état. The coup forced Imhof's government to resign and the establishment of a Provisional Executive Committee in his place until 7 December headed by Martin Ritter, who was the first Liechtensteiner head of government. Despite diplomatic efforts by Liechtenstein, it received no representation in the negotiations or signing of the Treaty of Versailles, though the country received indirect recognition of its sovereignty in the Treaty of Saint-Germain-en-Laye.

=== Interwar period (1919–1939) ===
In 1919, following the dissolution of Austria-Hungary the Liechtenstein government could no longer rely on Austria to fulfil its monetary and diplomatic needs. Liechtenstein and Switzerland signed a treaty under which Switzerland assumed the representation of Liechtenstein's interests at the diplomatic and consular level in countries where it maintained a representation and Liechtenstein did not. Liechtenstein adopted the Swiss franc in 1920 and the two countries entered a customs union in 1924. Liechtenstein applied to join the League of Nations in 1920, though unsuccessfully. Switzerland was the only country to vote in favour of their accession at the League of Nations Assembly on 17 December 1920, as opposed to 28 against.

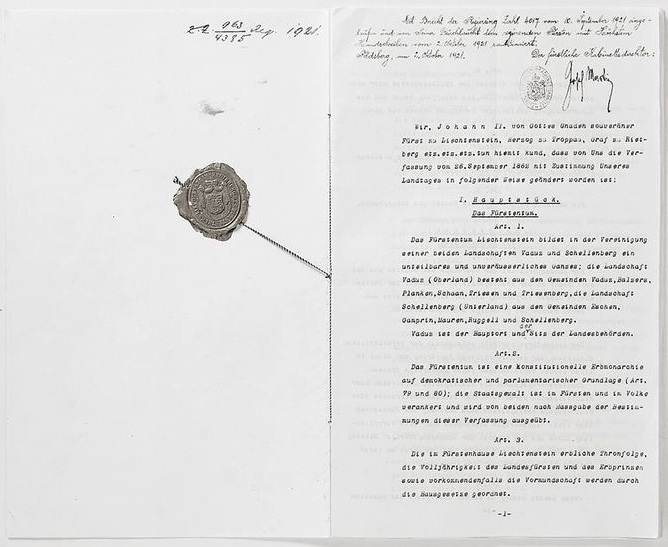
Front page of the Liechtenstein constitution, as signed by Prince Karl Aloys and Josef Ospelt on 5 October 1921.

The November 1918 putsch would begin a period of the next three years where both the Progressive Citizens' Party and Christian-Social People's Party worked together in creating a new constitution based on a constitutional monarchy, much of which was loosely based on the Swiss Federal Constitution. The drafting process included prominent politicians such as Wilhelm Beck, Josef Ospelt and Josef Peer, of which Beck and Peer created the first draft for the constitution. It was signed into law by Prince Karl Aloys on behalf of Johann II and Josef Ospelt as a government representative on 5 October 1921. It established the rule of partial parliamentary democracy mixed with that of constitutional monarchy, as well as providing for referendums on decisions of the Landtag. It also abolished the three seats in the Landtag appointed by the Prince and lowered the voting age from 24 to 21 with universal male suffrage.

==== 1928 embezzlement scandal ====
The country was subject to an embezzlement scandal in 1928, where it was revealed that leading members of the Christian-Social People's Party had embezzled funds from the National Bank of Liechtenstein into various speculative transactions. The scandal forced the government of Gustav Schädler to resign and early elections to be called.

==== Rotter kidnapping ====
After the rise of Nazi Germany in 1933 and the introduction of anti-Jewish laws in Germany, Liechtenstein experienced a large rise of Jewish emigrants into the country in which the government, led by Josef Hoop, had supported the naturalization of the refugees under a new citizenship law. In doing this, Liechtenstein faced attacks from German press and internal sources such as the Liechtenstein Homeland Service. Hoop personally attempted to temper relations with Germany through the use of private contacts and actively downplayed the threat of National-socialism within Liechtenstein. Most notably, German film directors and theatre managers Fritz and Alfred Rotter with a Jewish background were naturalized in Liechtenstein in 1931. Following German press and demands for their extradition local Liechtenstein Nazis used the event to attempt to kidnap the two men and forcefully return them to Nazi Germany in the Rotter kidnapping. However, this failed and as a result of a highly publicized trial it held back the formation of an organized Nazi party in Liechtenstein until 1938.

==== 1937 spy affair ====
In January 1937, Carl Freiherr von Vogelsang, editor of Liechtensteiner Vaterland and a founding member of the Liechtenstein Homeland Service, had sent a letter asking the police in Friedrichshafen or the border guards in Lindau to arrest Ludwig Hasler, the head of the Liechtenstein tax office, claiming that his upcoming trip to Germany for a foreign exchange was a part of a conspiracy by German-Jewish emigrants three years prior in 1934. As a result, Hoop ordered a search of the offices of the Vaterland for any incriminating letters and Vogelsang promptly left the country. A majority of the Landtag approved of Hoop's actions, but members of the Patriotic Union called for his resignation over the issue, believing the search to be unconstitutional. It was decided that two special judges would determine the legal implications of the case. Eventually, in July 1937, it was concluded by both judges that Hoop had not acted unconstitutionally by ordering the search of Vogelsang, and Hoop was subsequently legally acquitted of any wrong-doing.

==== 1938–1939 crisis and failed putsch ====
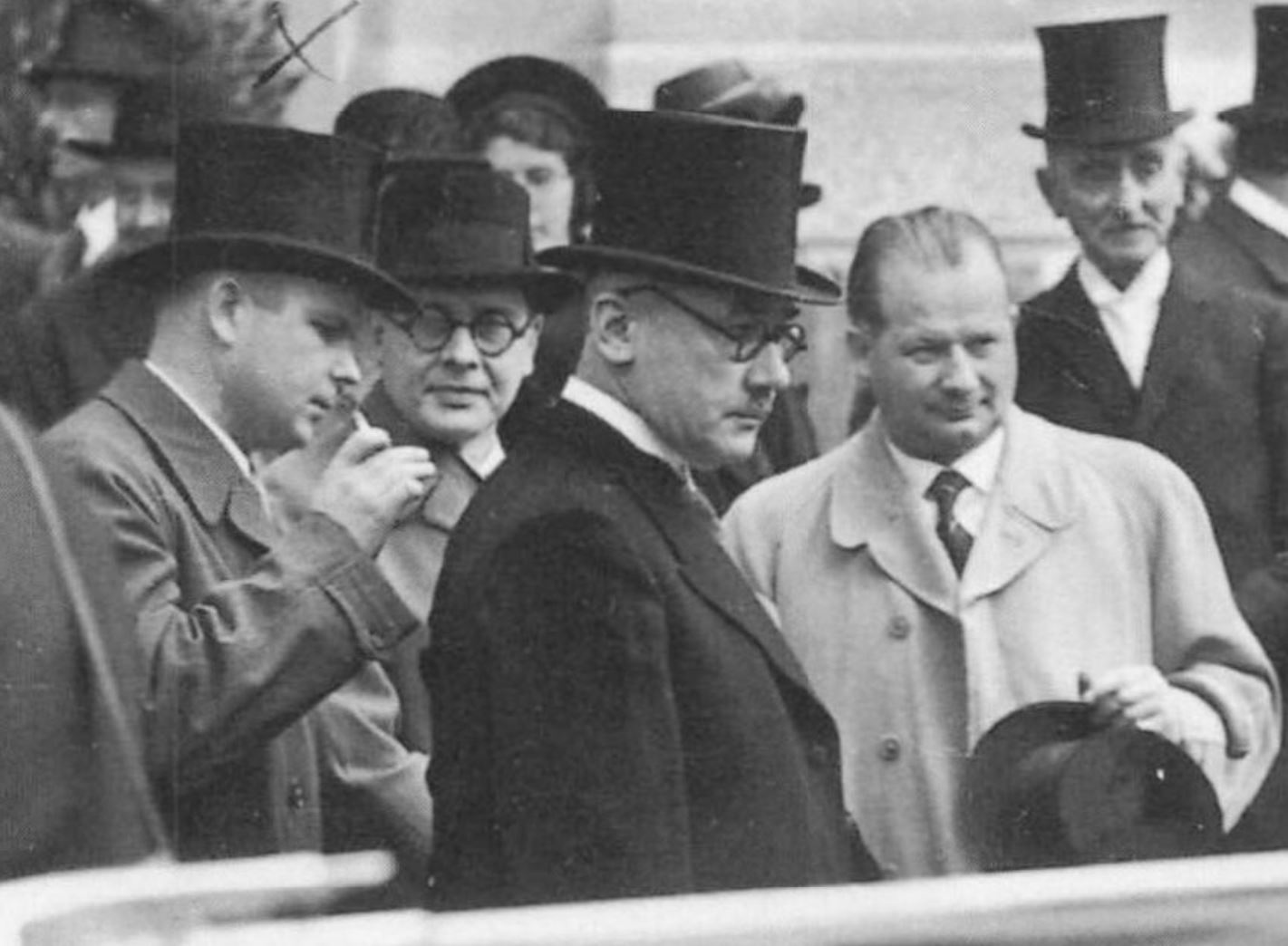
Four major political figures in Liechtenstein in 1938. From left; Alois Vogt, Otto Schaedler, Josef Hoop and Ludwig Marxer.

On 31 March 1938, in the wake of the Anschluss of Austria, Franz I made his grandnephew Franz Joseph II regent and moved to Feldberg, Czechoslovakia. On 25 July, he died while at one of his family's castles, Castle Feldberg, and Franz Joseph formally succeeded him as prince of Liechtenstein as Franz Joseph II. Around the same time, the German National Movement in Liechtenstein (VDBL), a local Liechtenstein Nazi party, was formed and advocated for the annexation of Liechtenstein into Nazi Germany. There were plans for the party, with connections to the Volksdeutsche Mittelstelle, to be democratically elected into power via funding from Germany, then it would end the customs union with Switzerland and align towards Germany, leading to an eventual annexation of Liechtenstein into Germany. The plans were reportedly supported by Joseph Goebbels. However, it was personally blocked by Adolf Hitler himself as he did not want to complicate relations with Switzerland.

Under the initiative of Franz Joseph, the Progressive Citizens' Party and Patriotic Union started negotiations for the formation of a coalition government, led by Josef Hoop and Otto Schaedler respectively. This coalition was designed to avoid political deadlock while there was ongoing threat from Nazi Germany, and more importantly, prevent the VDBL from gaining any seats within the Landtag. A compromise for the coalition was to introduce a proportional representation to the country, despite it being rejected via referendum three years prior. It was introduced unanimously on 18 January 1939. Shortly after, Franz Joseph, in agreement with both parties, disbanded the Landtag and called for new elections. However, the subsequent 1939 general election was only used to distribute a roughly equal number of seats in the Landtag between the two parties, as such it became known as the "silent election" as no actual voting took place. This was primarily due to both parties desire to not hold an election campaign period that would jeopardize the recently formed coalition government and allow for the VDBL to be able to gain support.

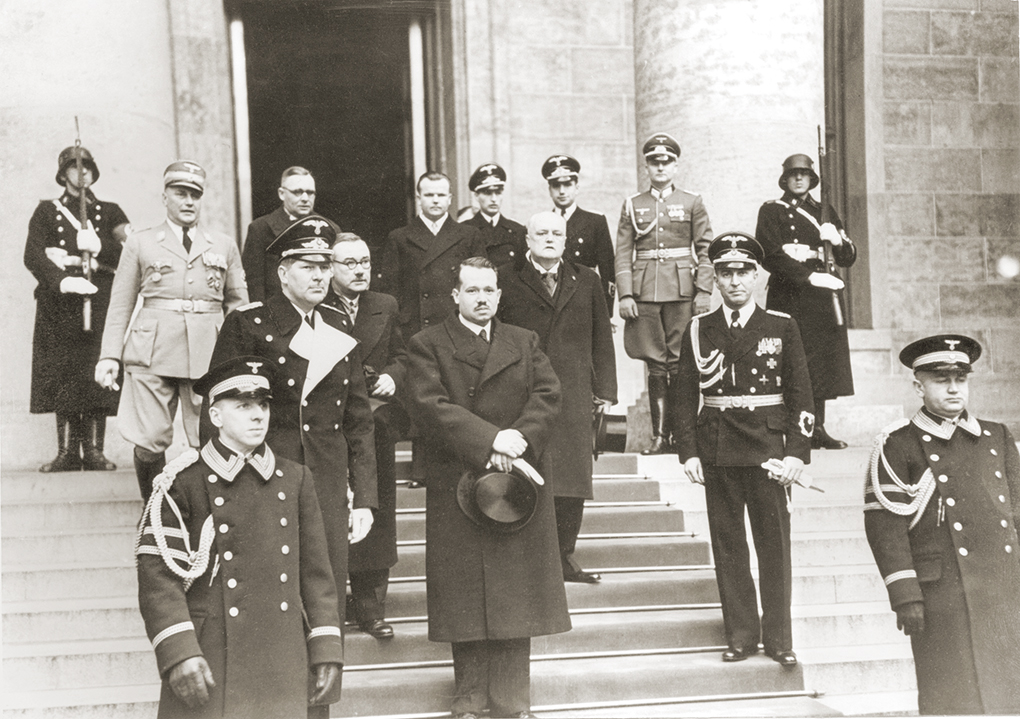
Franz Joseph II (centre) with members of the German and Liechtenstein government outside the Reich Chancellery in Berlin, 2 March 1939.

In March 1939, Franz Josef, Hoop and Alois Vogt paid an official visit to Berlin where they met Adolf Hitler and Joachim von Ribbentrop in which they discussed safeguarding Liechtenstein's independence and neutrality while maintaining good relations. Franz Joseph later reminisced on the visit and stated that Hitler showed little interest in them and that it only took place in order to "flatter Hitler's ego".

On 24 March 1939, the 1939 putsch took place. The plan was for members of the VDBL to march on Vaduz and seize control of the government, which was hoped would cause clashes between them and the government. German troops from Feldkirch would then move into Liechtenstein in response to a call for help and incorporate the country into Germany. The plan failed however, as they were stopped by opponents, and most VDBL members were arrested or fled. No German invasion took place as it was blocked by Hitler's orders following intervention by Alois Vogt. It is not exactly known why Hitler decided to not intervene in the coup, though it has been speculated that he had little interest in Liechtenstein, and that he did not want to provoke a war with Switzerland. This led to the Liechtenstein Loyalty Association, a nonpartisan organisation designed to oppose the actions of the VDBL that was formed earlier in the year, to heighten its operations and launch a signature campaign reaffirming Liechtenstein's independence, which gained 2492 signatures.

=== World War II ===
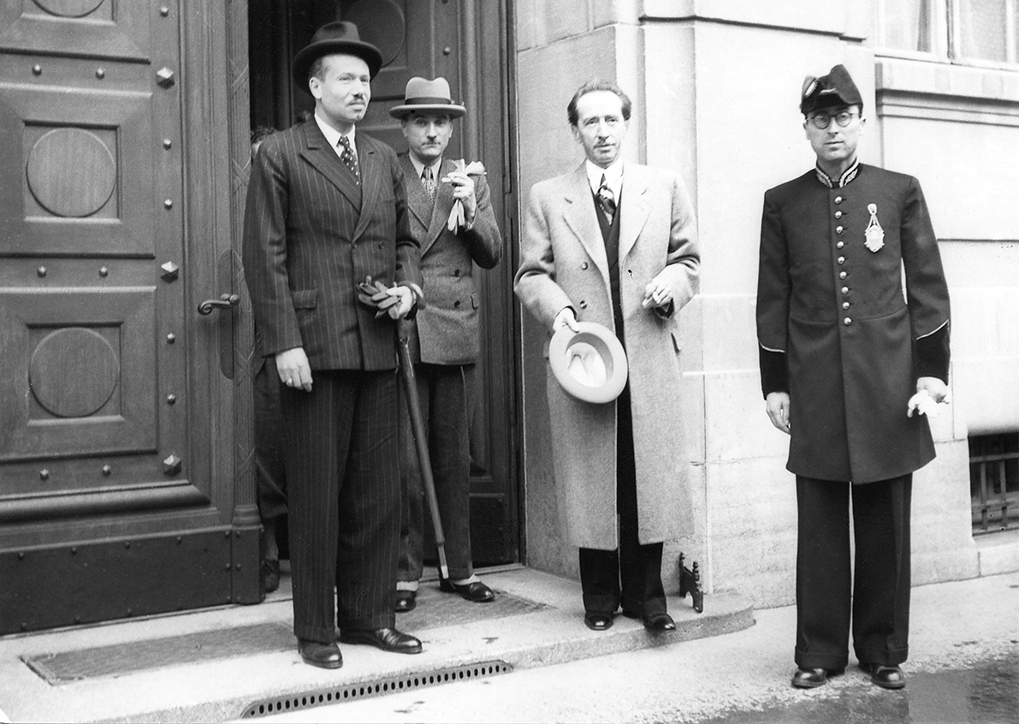
Franz Joseph II, Marcel Pilet-Golaz and Enrico Celio in Bern, 1943.

During World War II, Liechtenstein remained neutral, while family treasures within the war zone were brought to Liechtenstein (and London) for safekeeping. At the same time, Liechtenstein tied itself as closely as possible to Switzerland during the war in hopes of retaining the country's neutrality. It achieved the de facto inclusion of Liechtenstein in the Swiss national supply. Franz Joseph himself periodically sent congratulatory letters to Hitler, such as the thwarting of the 20 July plot, of which he briefly replied. Though Nazi Germany did have plans for the annexation of Liechtenstein, primarily in Operation Tannenbaum, these were never implemented and Liechtenstein's neutrality was not violated during the war. In 1943, at the request of both the Progressive Citizens' Party and Patriotic Union, Franz Joseph extended the government's term indefinitely while there was ongoing threat from Nazi Germany, primarily to prevent the (VDBL) from gaining seats in the Landtag. General elections were not held again until April 1945, shortly before the end of the war.

Notable figures in the Liechtenstein government, such as Alois Vogt, retained contacts with Nazi Germany during the war, such as Volksdeutsche Mittelstelle, who regarded him as a trusted contact. Three Liechtensteiners were sentenced to death by Switzerland for spying for Nazi Germany during the war. Most notably, Alfred Quaderer, a Liechtenstein citizen who became an agent for the Volksdeutsche Mittelstelle was sentenced to death for treason against Switzerland in March 1944. Despite efforts by Quaderer's sister and mother to have him pardoned, such as pleading to Franz Joseph for a private audience, they were denied, and he was executed by firing squad on 7 June 1944, aged 24 years old.

Just before the end of the war, Franz Joseph granted political asylum to First Russian National Army pro-Axis pro-emperor Grand Duke Vladimir Kirillovich of Russia White emigres led by General Boris Smyslovsky, who were being cared for by the Liechtenstein Red Cross. On 16 August 1945, the Soviet Union sent a delegation to Liechtenstein in an attempt to repatriate the Russians, which was refused despite increasing Soviet pressure to participate in the repatriation program. Eventually the government of Argentina offered the Russians asylum, and about a hundred people left. This is commemorated by a monument at the border town of Hinterschellenberg which is marked on the country's tourist map. According to prime minister Alexander Frick, with the support of Franz Joseph, the Russians were at no point in danger of being extradited and the general population of Liechtenstein supported the government in providing asylum to them.

At the close of the conflict, Czechoslovakia and Poland, acting to seize what they considered to be German possessions, expropriated the entirety of the Liechtenstein dynasty's hereditary lands and possessions in Bohemia, Moravia, and Silesia — the princes of Liechtenstein lived in Vienna until the Anschluss of 1938. During the war, Liechtenstein's princely family owned land in Austria whose managers hired Nazi forced labor, but a much later inquiry found the family not to have known about this. The expropriations (subject to modern legal dispute at the International Court of Justice) included over 1,600 square kilometres (600 sq mi) of agricultural and forest land (most notably the UNESCO listed Lednice–Valtice Cultural Landscape), and several family castles and palaces. Citizens of Liechtenstein were also forbidden from entering Czechoslovakia during the Cold War. In August 1945, Pierre Laval, the Prime Minister of Vichy France, had attempted to seek refuge in Liechtenstein after being flown to the American-occupied zone of Austria, but was turned away.

== Post-War era ==
=== Cold war ===
After World War II, the country's low taxes spurred strong economic growth. Liechtenstein became increasingly important as a financial center. In dire financial straits following the war, the Liechtenstein dynasty often resorted to selling family artistic treasures, including for instance the portrait "Ginevra de' Benci" by Leonardo da Vinci, which was purchased by the National Gallery of Art of the United States in 1967. Liechtenstein prospered, however, during the decades following, as its economy modernized with the advantage of low corporate tax rates which drew many companies to the country.

In 1949, Liechtenstein ceded the Ellhorn mountain to Switzerland as a result of Swiss demands and threats to, among other things, end the customs union between the two countries. Despite the local community in Balzers previously refusing to do so in November 1948, the transfer was approved by the Landtag of Liechtenstein the following month. In exchange to the transfer, Switzerland agreed to forgive much of Liechtenstein's debt that it had acquired to the country throughout World War II.

Liechtenstein was neutral during the Cold War, but sided with the West ideologically, politically and economically. The nuclear threat has led to the expansion of civil defence since the 1960s in Liechtenstein. In 1964–1965, the Liechtenstein government built a command bunker with protection against nuclear bombs in Vaduz. Liechtenstein condemned the suppression of the Hungarian Revolution of 1956 and the 1968 invasion of Czechoslovakia. Liechtenstein boycotted the Olympic Games twice- in 1956 in Melbourne in protest against the suppression of the Hungarian uprising and in 1980 in Moscow due to the Soviet war in Afghanistan. Women in Liechtenstein received voting rights for the first time, following a referendum on the topic (among men only) in 1984.

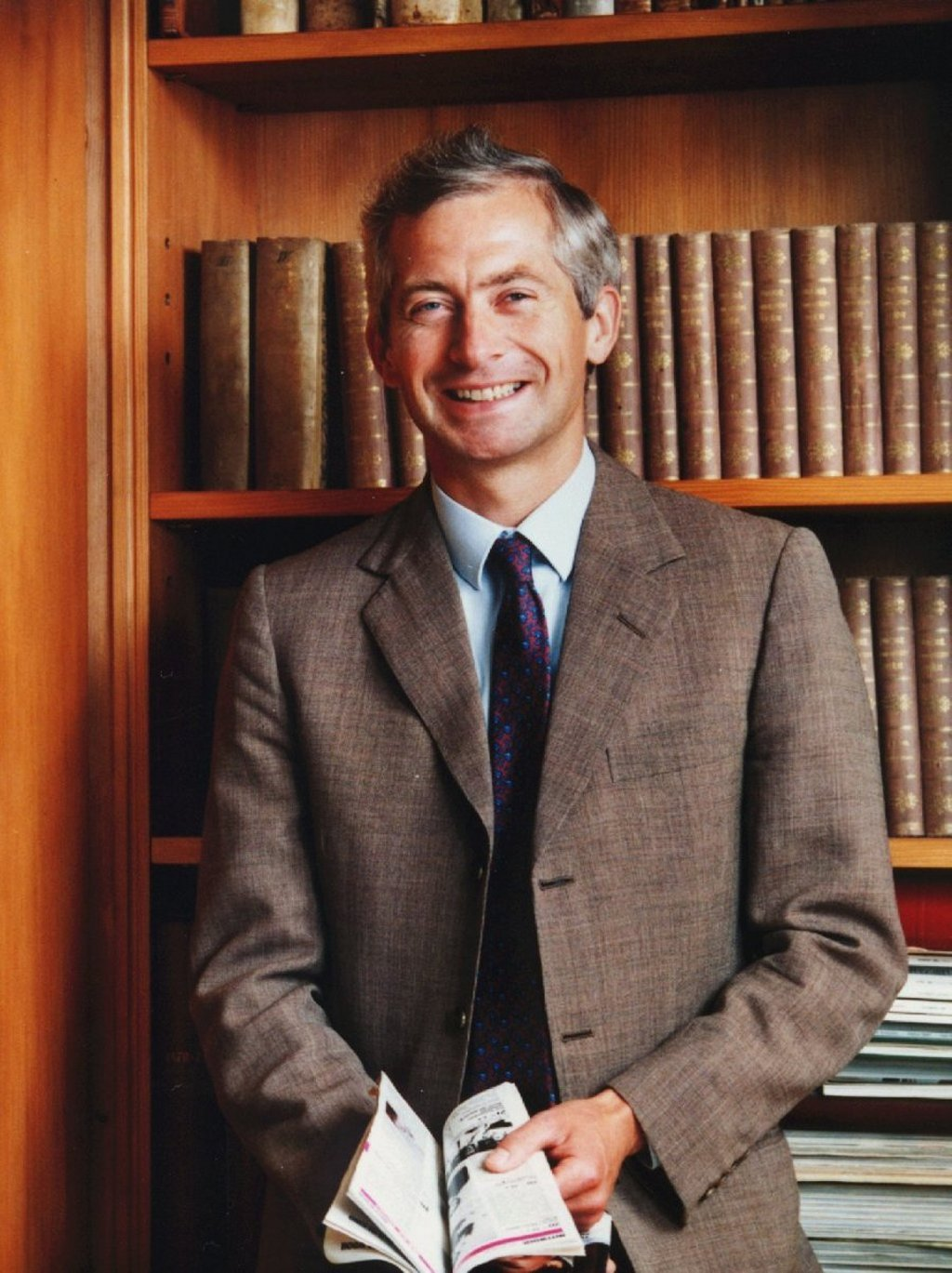
Hans-Adam II, Prince of Liechtenstein

Franz Joseph II handed over most of his powers to his son, Hans-Adam on 26 August 1984. On 13 November 1989, he succeeded him as prince as Hans-Adam II. In 1996, Russia returned the Liechtenstein family's archives, ending a long-running dispute between the two countries. In 1978, Liechtenstein became a member of the Council of Europe, and then joined the United Nations in 1990 following Security Council Resolution 663 and a member of the European Free Trade Association (EFTA) in its own right in 1991.

=== 1990s ===
On 6 December 1992 a referendum was to be held in Switzerland on a federal resolution on the accession to the European Economic Area (EEA). In correspondence with the customs union between the two countries, a similar referendum was to be held in Liechtenstein at a similar time.

Hans-Adam II called for the referendum to be held before the corresponding referendum in Switzerland, against the countries custom union and the wishes of the government with the Landtag of Liechtenstein. On 28 October 1992, he threatened to dismiss the Landtag and prime minister Hans Brunhart over the dispute and appoint an acting Prime Minister in his place. In response, approximately 2000 people demonstrated in front of the government house in Vaduz. In the same day, the government and Hans-Adam II negotiated and came to an agreement that scheduled the referendum after the corresponding one in Switzerland, though notably it affirmed that Liechtenstein would commit to agreements with the EEA despite the result in Switzerland.

As a result, the 1923 customs union treaty between Liechtenstein and Switzerland was now compromised, and was no longer viable due to conflicting interests regarding accession to the EEA. In 1994, the treaty was revised to allow for greater freedom for Liechtenstein in defining its foreign policy. A referendum on the topic took place on 9 April 1995, which was accepted by 55.9% of voters. Liechtenstein subsequently joined the EEA in May the same year.

In 1997, at the start of Mario Frick's second term, the coalition government that had existed between the Progressive Citizens' Party and Patriotic Union since 1938 was dissolved, marking the first time either party had been in opposition to each other since.

== Liechtenstein during the 21st century ==
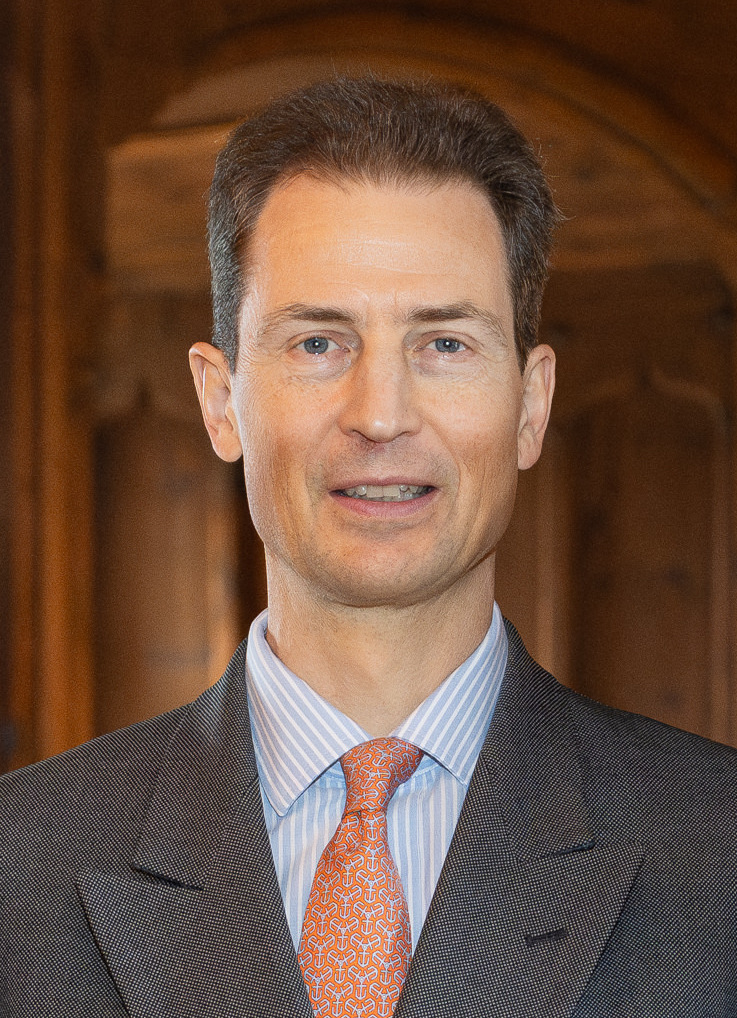
Alois, Hereditary Prince of Liechtenstein in 2024

In a referendum on 16 March 2003, Prince Hans-Adam, who had threatened to leave the country if he lost, won a large majority (64.3%) in favour of overhauling the constitution to effectively give him more powers than any other European monarch. The new constitution gave the prince the right to dismiss governments and approve judicial nominees and allowed him to veto laws simply by refusing to sign them within a six-month period.

On 15 August 2003, Hans-Adam announced he would step down in one year and hand over the reins to his son Alois. On 15 August 2004, Prince Hans-Adam handed over the practical running of the principality to his son, Crown Prince Alois, although still remaining official head of state.

On 1 July 2007, the first two consuls in the history of the Principality were appointed to represent Liechtenstein in the United States of America. On 1 March 2007, the Swiss Armed Forces "invaded" Liechtenstein territory by mistake, with 170 Swiss Army troops crossing the border.

On 27 November 2005, Liechtenstein voters rejected an initiative that would prohibit abortion and birth control in the country. The initiative was supported by Roman Catholic Archbishop Wolfgang Haas. Prince Alois was initially sympathetic to the proposal, but he became neutral during the run-up to the vote. Instead, a government-sponsored counter proposal was ratified. In 2011, Alois announced he would veto any relaxing of the ban on abortion in Liechtenstein, which was an subject for referendum later that year. Such a veto was not necessary, however, as the voters rejected the proposal.

Following the prince's threat, an initiative called "Damit deine Stimme zählt" ("So that your voice counts") was launched to change the constitution of Liechtenstein to prevent the prince from vetoing legislation approved in referendums. The referendum was held on 1 July 2012, and 76% of voters upheld the prince's power to veto referendum results.

In November 2022, the Landtag of Liechtenstein passed a motion calling on the government to introduce a bill legalizing same-sex marriage, with broad support from across the political spectrum. A bill legalizing same-sex marriage was introduced in February 2024 and passed its final reading in the Landtag on 16 May 2024 by a 24–1 vote.

On 21 October 2024, Liechtenstein joined the International Monetary Fund.

== See also ==
- List of monarchs of Liechtenstein
- Military history of Liechtenstein
- List of heads of government of Liechtenstein
- Politics of Liechtenstein

General

- History of Europe

== Bibliography ==
- Nohlen, Dieter; Stöver, Philip (2010). Elections in Europe: A data handbook. Nomos. ISBN 978-3-8329-5609-7.
- Geiger, Peter (2007). Der Kleinstaat in der Ära der Weltkriege (PDF) (in German). Schaan: Liechtenstein Institute, Liechtensteinischen Akademischen Gesellschaft. pp. 141–143.
- Geiger, Peter (1997a). Liechtenstein in den Dreissigerjahren 1928–1939 (in German) (1st ed.). Zürich: Liechtenstein Institute. ISBN 3-906393-28-3.
- Geiger, Peter (2000). Liechtenstein in den Dreissigerjahren 1928–1939 (in German) (2nd ed.). Zürich: Liechtenstein Institute.
- Geiger, Peter (1999). Landesverrat. Der Fall des 1944 in der Schweiz hingerichteten Alfred Quaderer (in German) (98 ed.). Vaduz: Jahrbuch des Historischen Vereins für das Fürstentum Liechtenstein. pp. 109–142.
- Tolstoy, Nikolai (1977). The Secret Betrayal. Charles Scribner's Sons. ISBN 0-684-15635-0.
