= Ludwig Freiherr von Falkenhausen =

Bavarian corporal (1816–1889)

- Born: 9 September 1816; Wald, Kingdom of Bavaria
- Died: 29 October 1889 (aged 73); Wald, German Empire
- Spouse: Eva Barbara Heubek (m. 1854)
- Children: 6
- Military career
- Allegiance: Kingdom of Bavaria; Liechtenstein
- Service years: 1834–1842; 1846–1858
- Conflicts: Palatine uprising

Ludwig Freiherr von Falkenhausen (9 September 1816 – 29 October 1889) was a corporal of the Royal Bavarian Army and later commander of the military of Liechtenstein.

== Life ==
Falkenhausen was born on 9 September 1816 as the son of Julius Otto Christian Freiherr von Falkenhausen and Countess Julie Sophie von Platen-Hallermund.

From 1834 to 1842 he was a corporal in the Royal Bavarian Army in the cavalry. In 1846, he joined the Liechtenstein military as a second lieutenant and on 13 March 1848 assumed command of it. During the Revolution of 1848 in Liechtenstein the military was not used against the revolutionaries, and Falkenhausen was granted leave in April of the same year in order to prevent attacks from the Liechtenstein population. He reassumed command of the military 8 June 1849, where he was involved in the military action to crush the Baden Revolution. However, due to being a protestant he was not immediately approved by the catholic-prominent Liechtenstein population. He remained commander of the military until 1858 when he retired in combination to personal debts and alcoholism, when he then returned to Bavaria. He was succeeded by Peter Rheinberger.

Falkenhausen married Eva Barbara Heubek on 8 November 1854 and they had six children together. He died on 29 October 1889, aged 73 years old.
