= Military history of Liechtenstein =

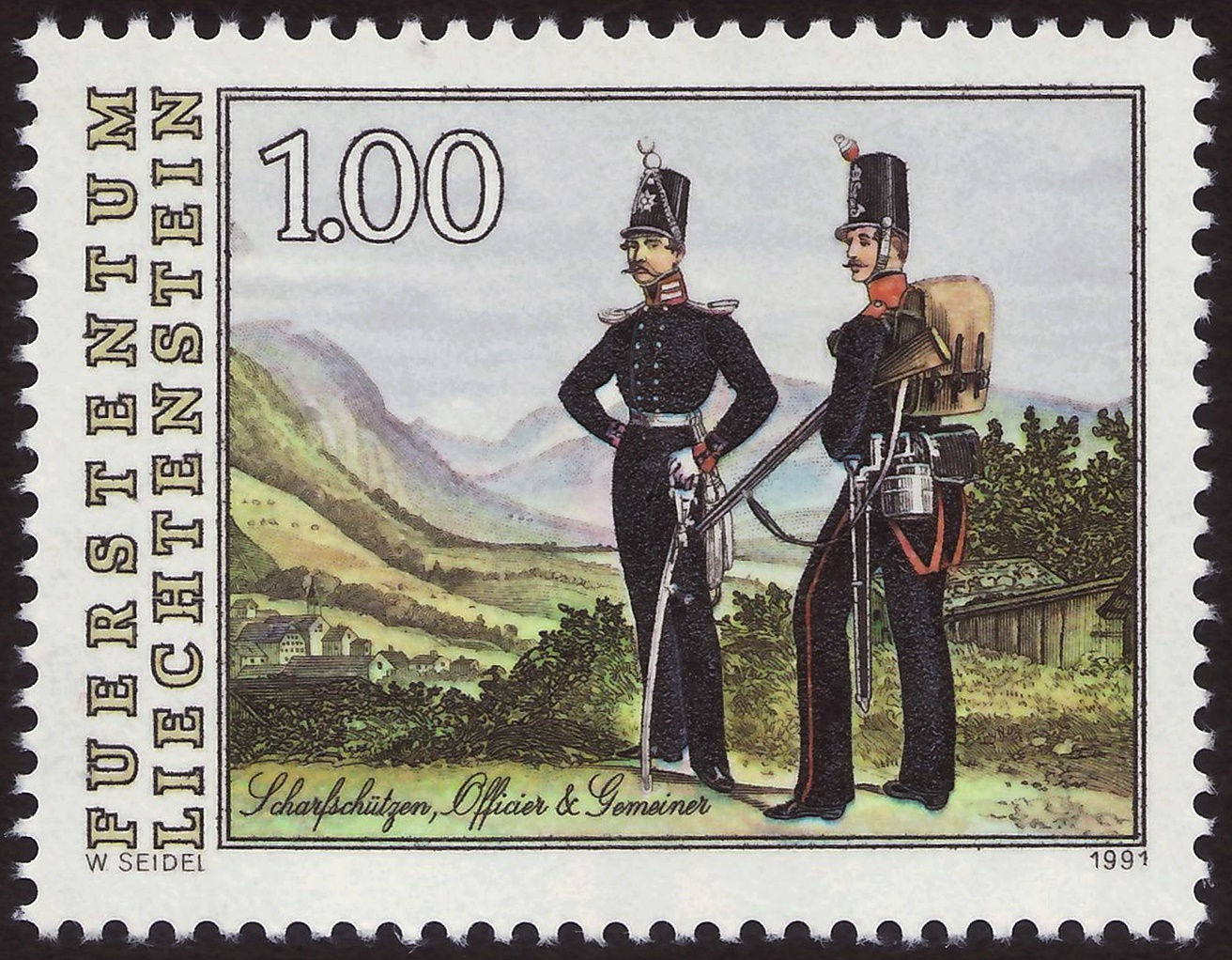
1866 Liechtenstein military illustrated on a commemorative stamp

The military history of Liechtenstein dates back to its predecessors in the County of Vaduz and Lordship of Schellenberg. Liechtenstein disbanded its army in 1868, and has had no standing army since. However, under the constitution of Liechtenstein citizens are still obligated to defend the country in the event of an external threat, and the army may be reformed if deemed necessary.

== Middle ages ==
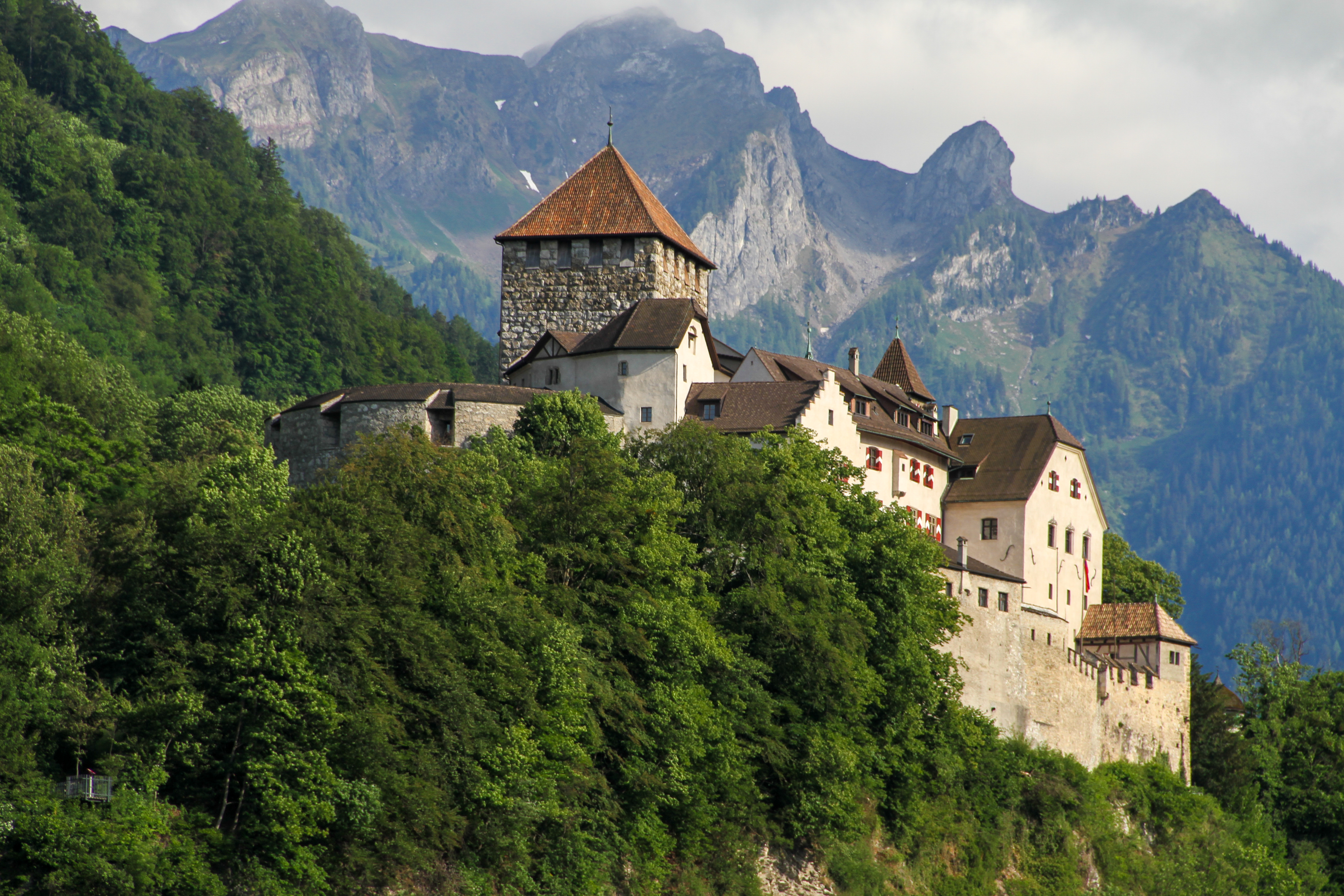
Vaduz Castle, built during the Middle Ages

Both the County of Vaduz and the Lordship of Schellenberg respectively held regional militias tasked with the defending of their territories, primarily compositioned of Ministerialis. Similarly to their neighbour Switzerland, men of both states would enlist as mercenaries to fight in foreign conflicts, primarily in France, Naples, Netherlands, Austria and the Papal States. Most notably, such mercenaries saw significant action during the Swabian War of 1499, where Vaduz was invaded and burned by Swiss troops.

Due to concerns of further Swiss invasion as a result of continued tensions between Switzerland and Austria, both the County of Vaduz and Lordship of Schellenberg signed a defensive alliance with Austria in 1505, in which the Vaduz Castle and local militias were placed at the disposal of the House of Habsburg in return for an annual payment. Liechtenstein was obligated to provide a military force to the Swabian Circle of the Holy Roman Empire since its formation in the early 15th century, which was maintained until its dissolution its in 1803.

During the Thirty Years' War, the area that was to become Liechtenstein was invaded by both Austrian and then later Swedish forces. As a result, notable actions by units included the defence of Bregenz against Swedish forces in 1647.

== Eighteenth and nineteenth centuries ==
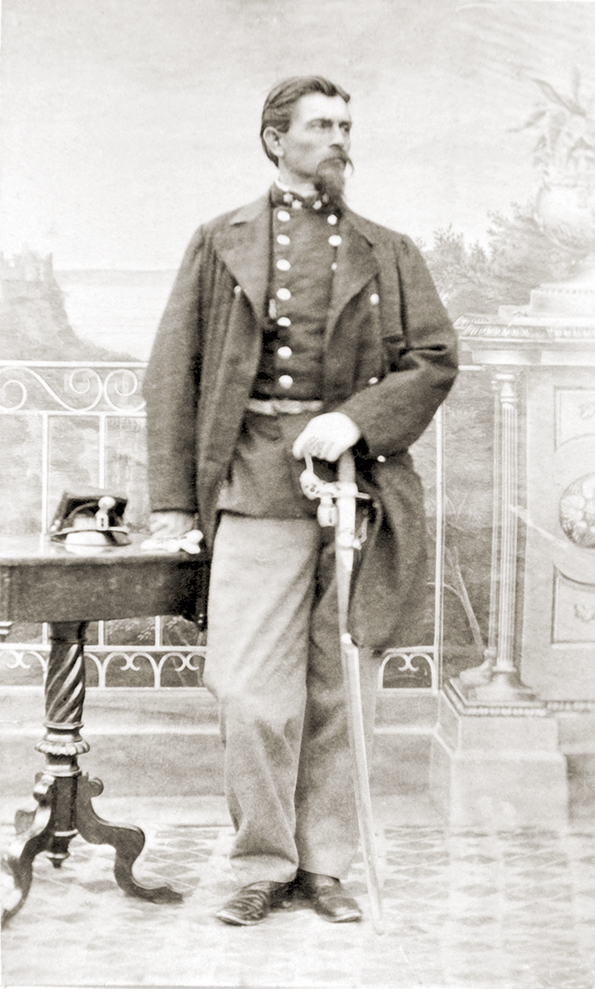
Peter Rheinberger in Liechtenstein uniform, 1860

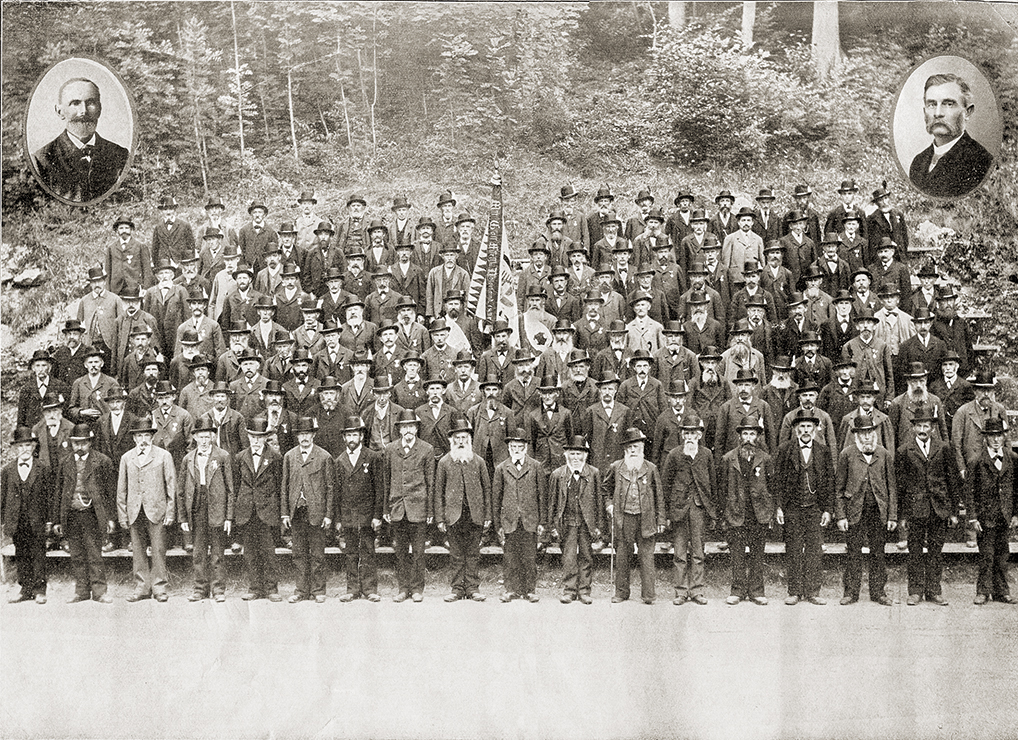
The Liechtenstein veterans association in 1896, showing the remaining soldiers of the army that was disestablished in 1868.

Both the County of Vaduz and the Lordship of Schellenberg were procured by Johann Adam Andreas of Liechtenstein in 1699 and 1712 respectively, and both were merged to form the principality of Liechtenstein under decree by Charles VI, Holy Roman Emperor. As such, militias of both states merged under the command of the House of Liechtenstein, of which consisted of 19 men in 1714.

In the War of the First Coalition, Liechtenstein, as part of the Holy Roman Empire contributed approximately 20 troops to the coalition forces from 1793 to 1796. During the War of the Second Coalition, France invaded the country on 6 March 1799 and plundered several towns, including Nendeln that was burned by French troops, which resulted in the deaths of four people. The Austrian and Vorarlberg state militias under command by Lieutenant field marshal Franjo Jelačić defeated 18,000 French troops stationed in Liechtenstein under command of General André Masséna and liberated the country by 14 May. The French occupied Liechtenstein for a few years until it gained its independence again in 1815. Liechtenstein shortly afterwards joined the German Confederation, in which it was also obligated to provide a military force, which initially consisted of 55 men. In the same year, Liechtenstein's sovereignty was guaranteed by Austria, Russia and Prussia as a member of the Holy Alliance under Austria.

The military was commanded by Bavarian corporal Ludwig Freiherr von Falkenhausen from 1848 to 1858, though as a Protestant he was not immediately accepted by the catholic-dominant Liechtenstein population. Like most of Europe at the time, the country was faced with the Revolution of 1848 in Liechtenstein, though the military was not used against the revolutionaries and Falkenhausen was granted leave in April of the same year. However the Liechtenstein military was involved with military action to suppress the Baden Revolution. On 15 June 1859 Peter Rheinberger was promoted by Johann II to first lieutenant and placed in command of the Liechtenstein military, being the only Liechtensteiner to hold the position. In this position, along with Andreas Walch, he oversaw its reorganisation and the administrative running of the military, of which now was expanded to consist of 82 men.

During the Austro-Prussian War of 1866, Prince Johann II placed his soldiers at the disposal of the Confederation but only to “defend the German territory of Tyrol”. However, the newly-formed Landtag of Liechtenstein had not been consulted regarding the deployment and the war was unpopular among the population, as such it faced resistance from the Landtag. As a result, Johann II promised a loan to the country and refused to have his men fight against other Germans. The Liechtenstein contingent took up position on the Stilfser Joch under the command of Peter Rheinberger to defend the Austrian border against possible attacks by the Italians under Giuseppe Garibaldi. A reserve of 2 men remained in Liechtenstein at Vaduz Castle. When the war ended on 22 July, the army of Liechtenstein marched home to a ceremonial welcome in Vaduz. Popular legend claims that 80 men went to war but 81 came back. Though it is disputed who this person was, apparently an Austrian liaison officer joined up with the contingent on the way back, whereas it has also been claimed that it was an Italian farmer.

The German Confederation dissolved in 1866. Due to its unpopularity among the population and the rising cost to maintain it, Liechtenstein disbanded its army of 80 men on 12 February 1868 and declared its permanent neutrality. In 1893, former soldiers of the Liechtenstein army founded a veterans association, which had 141 members in 1896. Its last surviving member, Andreas Kieber, died in 1939, aged 94 years old.

== Modern era ==
Though Liechtenstein was neutral throughout World War I, it was closely tied to Austria-Hungary due to the customs union between the two countries and was sympathetic to the Central Powers. Foreign citizens living in Liechtenstein were conscripted into the armies of their respective home countries, primarily Austria-Hungary and Germany, of which 27 did not return. In addition, many Liechtensteiners also voluntarily enlisted in both armies, including several members of the House of Liechtenstein. In total, 4 Liechtenstein citizens are known to have been killed in the war despite the country being neutral, including Prince Heinrich of Liechtenstein, who is the highest member of the house of Liechtenstein to have been killed in action. Three Liechtensteiners were imprisoned for espionage during the war.

In 1918, Austria-Hungary collapsed and could no longer act a military guarantee on Liechtenstein. Starting from August 1919, the Liechtenstein government pushed an initiative through the Landtag of Liechtenstein to form a civil defence force to replace the military security previously provided by Austria-Hungary. It was approved on 8 March 1921, though the defence force was never established, and it was eventually repealed in 1925. In 1924, Liechtenstein and Switzerland entered a customs union which deemed the proposition of a new Liechtenstein military unnecessary.

During World War II, Liechtenstein remained neutral. The country sought to align itself as closely as possible with Switzerland during the war in hopes of retaining the country's neutrality and achieved the de facto inclusion of Liechtenstein in the Swiss national supply. Despite this, Prime Minister of Liechtenstein Josef Hoop did not reconsider the reformation of a Liechtenstein military in order to avoid provocation with Nazi Germany. Switzerland protected Liechtenstein's independence throughout the war. However, there were figures both inside and outside of Liechtenstein who used the country in order to recruit Liechtensteiners into the Waffen-SS and gain public sympathy for the Nazi cause, which infuriated Switzerland. During the war, several Liechtensteiners served in both the Waffen-SS and the Schutzpolizei. Liechtenstein was intended to be invaded and annexed by Nazi Germany alongside Switzerland in Operation Tannenbaum. In contrast with Swiss national defence plans to abandon the low regions in favour of the Swiss Alps, Liechtenstein was not planned to be directly defended by the Swiss army in the case of a German invasion.

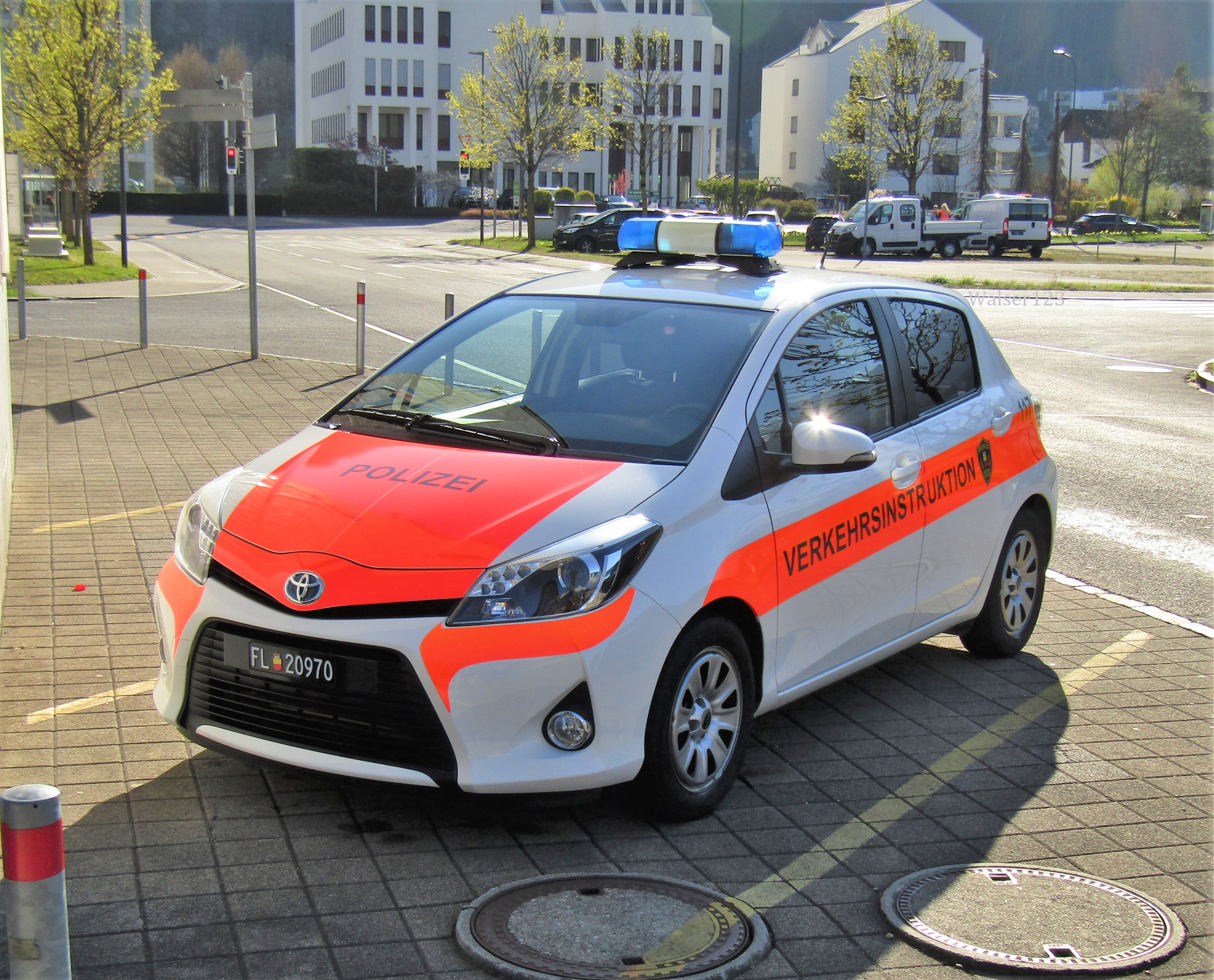
A Liechtenstein Police car

The nuclear threat throughout the Cold War led to the expansion of civil defence since the 1960s in Liechtenstein. From 1964 to 1965, the Liechtenstein government built a command bunker with protection against nuclear bombs in Vaduz. In the 21st-century, the Liechtenstein National Police is responsible for keeping order within the country. It consists of 87 field officers and 38 civilian staff, totaling 125 employees. All officers are equipped with small arms. However, under the constitution of Liechtenstein every citizen is required to defend the country in the event of an external threat, and the military may be reformed at any time if deemed necessary. The country has faced several accidental military incidents involving Switzerland, ranging from 1968 to 2007, though these were all disregarded.

As of January 2025, there are no plans for Liechtenstein to seek NATO membership. In February 2025, the Swiss Federal Council reiterated that Switzerland would not directly defend Liechtenstein in the event of a foreign attack, stating that it did not comply with the country's neutrality.

== See also ==
- History of Liechtenstein
- Swiss incursions into Liechtenstein
