= 1939 in Liechtenstein =

- Decades: 1910s; 1920s; 1930s; 1940s; 1950s
- See also: History of Liechtenstein; List of years in Liechtenstein

The following is a list of events from the year 1939 in Liechtenstein.

== Incumbents ==
- Prince: Franz Joseph II
- Prime Minister: Josef Hoop (Progressive Citizens' Party)
  - Third Josef Hoop cabinet
- 21st Landtag (until April)
- 22nd Landtag (from April)

== Events ==
- January:
  - 18 January – Proportional representation is introduced unanimously to Liechtenstein.
  - 24 January – The Liechtenstein Loyalty Association (HVL) forms; a nonpartisan organisation intended to counter the activities of the German National Movement in Liechtenstein (VDBL).
- February:
  - 12 February – The 1939 Liechtenstein local elections take place; the Progressive Citizens' Party (FBP) wins eight mayoral mandates while to the Patriotic Union (VU) wins three.
- March:
  - 2–3 March – Josef Hoop and Franz Joseph II travel to Berlin to meet Adolf Hitler and Joachim von Ribbentrop. They were received by Hitler for a 30 minute meeting, but no negotiations take place.
  - 11 March – Franz Joseph II dissolves the Landtag in agreement with the FBP and VU and calls for early elections.
  - 24 March – The 1939 Liechtenstein putsch takes place; members of the (VDBL) unsuccessfully attempt to provoke a clash with the Liechtenstein government with the aim forcing the country's annexation into Nazi Germany, and most participants are arrested or flee.
  - The HVL launches a signature campaign reaffirming Liechtenstein's independence, loyalty to the prince, and political alignment towards Switzerland. The campaign receives 2492 votes, representing 95% of Liechtenstein's eligible voters.
- April:
  - April 4 – The 1939 Liechtenstein general election takes place; the FBP and VU assign a roughly equal amount of seats in the Landtag from a predetermined list of candidates. No actual voting takes place.
- May:
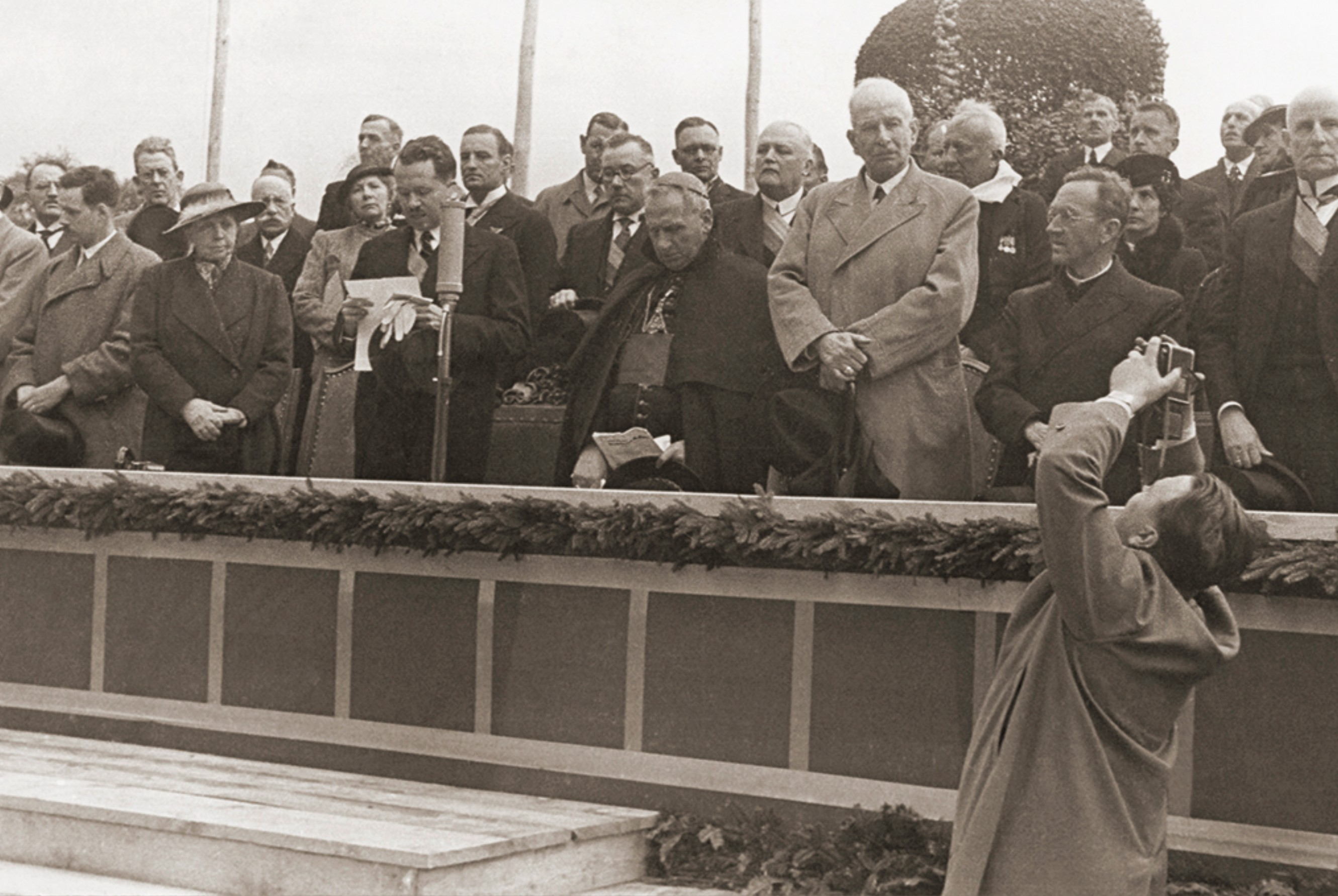
  Franz Joseph II giving a speech during a homage on 26 May 1939
  - May 26 – A homage to Franz Joseph II and for Liechtenstein's continued independence is held in Vaduz.
- August:
  - August 30 – Liechtenstein declares its neutrality via Swiss representatives.
- September:
  - September 2 – The Landtag grants Hoop's government extensive powers to micromanage the Liechtenstein economy and apply Swiss war economy laws to Liechtenstein.

== Deaths ==
- 19 April – Andreas Kieber, 94, soldier (b. 1844)
- 7 August – Basil Vogt, 60, politician (b. 1878)

== See also ==
- 1939 in Switzerland
