= Liechtenstein witch trials =

Witch trials between 1679 and 1682

The witch trials of the early modern period reached Liechtenstein in 1595 and ended in 1680. Trials that took place between 1675 and 1680 resulted in 200 deaths, almost ruining the governing House of Hohenems. The House of Liechtenstein subsequently assumed control of the region, leading some historians to attribute the creation of modern Liechtenstein to the region's witch trials.

== Early witch trials in Schellenberg and Vaduz: 1595–1651 ==
In the late 1500s, the country today known as Liechtenstein existed as two neighbouring states of the Holy Roman Empire: the Lordship of Schellenberg, and the County of Vaduz. Both were owned by the Counts of Sulz (today the House of Schwarzenberg) in 1595, the year of the first witch trials in the area. Few records of Liechtenstein's early trials survived into the 21st century, though some historians believe that between ten and twenty people were executed between 1595 and 1600.

Schellenberg and Vaduz were sold to the House of Hohenems, an ancient German noble family, in 1613. A small number of trials occurred in the 1630s, though there is no evidence that any of the accused were sentenced to death.

The area's next significant spate of trials occurred in Vaduz in August 1648, resulting in the deaths of 14 women. The Thirty Years' War, which devastated Central Europe, was waging its final year, and citizens began to blame accompanying misfortunes such as illness or drought on sorcery. Accused witches typically confessed early, aware that they would receive little natural justice.

By the time this third cycle of trials ended in 1651, historians estimate that around 100 people were executed in total. A further nine people were executed in the 1660s.

== Regime of Count Ferdinand: 1675–1686 ==
In 1675, Ferdinand Karl Franz von Hohenems assumed control of Schellenberg and Vaduz. His government launched witch trials the following year, taking out loans in order to persecute accused sorcerers. The regime quickly prosecuted so many people for witchcraft that neighbouring districts mocked the county as the "land of witches", which began to harm Vaduz's economy by 1678. Though Ferdinand also accrued heavy debts to pay for the trials, he briefly quelled his creditors' objections by promising them some of the confiscated funds.

The public's ire grew in 1679 after one witch trial resulted in the execution of twenty people, and Count Ferdinand's cousins lodged formal complaints against him with the Holy Roman Emperor. Historian Thomas Robisheaux describes further prosecutions in 1680, which proved to be the last witch trials in Schellenberg and Vaduz, as "arguably [one of] the most intense witch panics in the German territories". Indeed, by 1680, 300 people had been executed for witchcraft, equivalent to one-tenth of Vaduz's population at the time. Approximately 40% of victims were men, and 60% were women.

Executions that took place in 1680 would prove to be the last fatal witch trials in Schellenberg and Vaduz. Because the trials had targeted poor and affluent households alike, influential families protested Count Ferdinand's regime to Leopold I, Holy Roman Emperor in 1681.

An imperial commission investigated both Ferdinand's conduct and the validity of witch trials occurring in Schellenberg and Vaduz. The commission ultimately prohibited Count Ferdinand from continuing to prosecute (and seize assets from) alleged witches; a jurist at the University of Salzburg further recommended that all convictions from 1679 and 1680 should be revoked. An imperial order in 1684 enforced the commission's recommendations, and Ferdinand was arrested shortly thereafter; he remained in custody until his death on 18 February 1686.

== Analysis of prosecutions ==
Witch trials conducted by Ferdinand Karl Franz's government initially enjoyed strong public support, particularly among residents of Vaduz's Triesenberg and Triesen. By 1680, 300 people had been executed for witchcraft, equivalent to one-tenth of Vaduz's population at the time. Witches were typically executed by beheading, with their bodies burnt afterwards.

Historian Thomas Robisheaux would describe prosecutions in 1680, which would prove to be the last witch trials in Schellenberg and Vaduz, as "arguably [one of] the most intense witch panics in the German territories". Approximately 40% of the witches convicted in Vaduz between 1648 and 1680 were men; 60% were women.

== Creation of Liechtenstein ==
In 1699, Ferdinand's brother and heir Jakob Hannibal von Hohenems sold Schellenberg to the House of Liechtenstein, another German noble family with few holdings of its own. At this time, Schellenberg owed 244 creditors, and the sale was required to clear the Hohenems family's debt. Jakob also gave the Liechtensteins right of first refusal if his family decided to sell Vaduz as well, which the Liechtensteins exercised in 1712.

Charles VI, Holy Roman Emperor accepted the Liechtenstein family's request to formally unite their holdings of Schellenberg and Vaduz in 1719, establishing the Principality of Liechtenstein. Historians and writers including Wolfgang Behringer, Brian A. Pavlac, Günther Meier, and William Monter suggest that the modern state of Liechtenstein subsequently exists as a direct result of witch trials in the region.

== Aftermath ==
Tensions between the families of both witch trial victims and prosecutors persisted for decades after the House of Liechtenstein united Schellenberg and Vaduz.

Most of the witch trials resulted from accusations by the self-appointed Brenner ("Burners"), a group of zealots who used the witch trials to settle personal disputes. In Liechtensteiner folklore, the souls of the Brenner are said to inhabit a deep ravine called Tobel, where they are trapped until judgement day. They are subsequently known as the Tobelhocher ("ravine sitters"). Descendants of the Brenner experienced difficulties marrying as late as the mid-20th century.
