= Hermine Rheinberger =

Liechtensteiner writer (1864–1932)

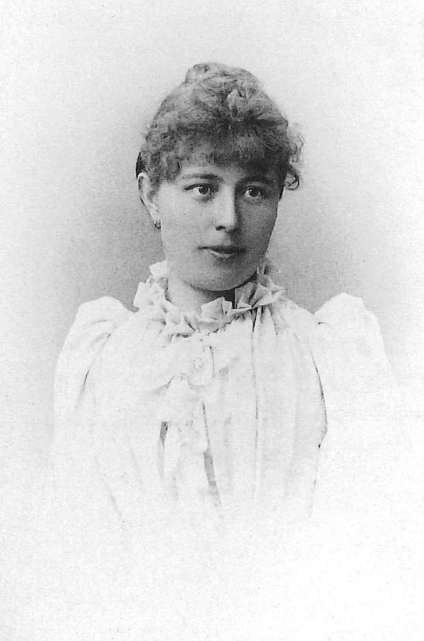
- Rheinberger in 1890
- Born: 14 July 1864; Vaduz, Liechtenstein
- Died: 24 January 1932 (aged 67); Mils, Tyrol, Austria
- Occupation: Writer
- Parent(s): Peter Rheinberger; Theresia Rheinberger
- Writing career
- Genre: Historical novels

Hermine Rheinberger (14 July 1864 – 24 January 1932) was a Liechtensteiner writer. She was Liechtenstein's first female author.

== Biography ==
Hermine Rheinberger was born on 14 July 1864 in Vaduz, the capital city of Liechtenstein. She was the oldest of four children born to Peter Rheinberger, a civil engineer and army officer, and her mother Theresia Rheinberger, growing up with two sisters – Olga and Emma – and a brother, the artist and architect Egon Rheinberger (1870–1936). Her uncle was the composer Josef Rheinberger.

After attending elementary school in Vaduz, Rheinberger studied at the Institut Gutenberg in Balzers, run by the Sisters of Christian Charity, from 1877 to 1881. She became interested in literature and history at a young age, and she was supported in her literary pursuits by her brother and by her cousin Ferdinand Nigg. In the late 1870s, she began to write poetry celebrating nature and her homeland of Liechtenstein.

In 1890 and 1891 she wrote the historical novel Gutenberg-Schalun: Eine Geschichte aus dem 14. Jahrhundert ("Gutenberg-Schalun: A Story From the 14th Century"), studying local history, folklore, and the Middle High German language as part of her research for the book. It was published in 1897, making her the first woman to publish a work of literature in Liechtenstein. The novel was well received, even drawing notice from Johann II.

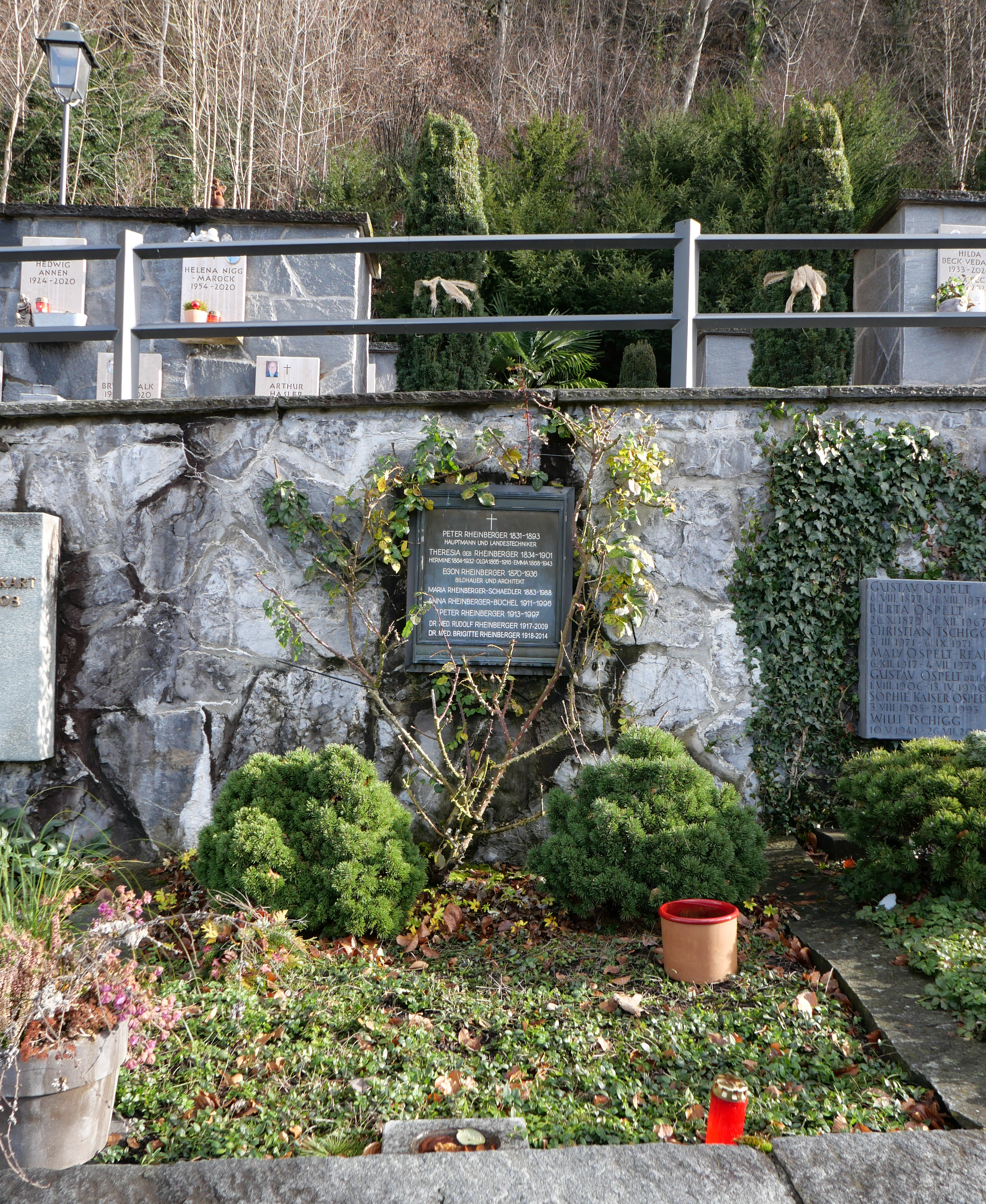
The family grave in 2024.

Rheinberger never married, focusing on her literary pursuits, until her career was cut short by illness. After she contracted influenza-encephalitis, her mental health declined in the late 1890s, and she was cared for first at home; then in a hospital run by her Aunt Maxentia, a member of the Sisters of Charity of Zams; and then at the teaching hospital in Innsbruck. From 1899 until her death in 1932, Rheinberger stayed at the St.-Josephs-Institut in Mils, Tyrol.

She is buried in the cemetery in Vaduz. Her parents and siblings are buried in the same grave.
