= County of Werdenberg =

County of the Holy Roman Empire

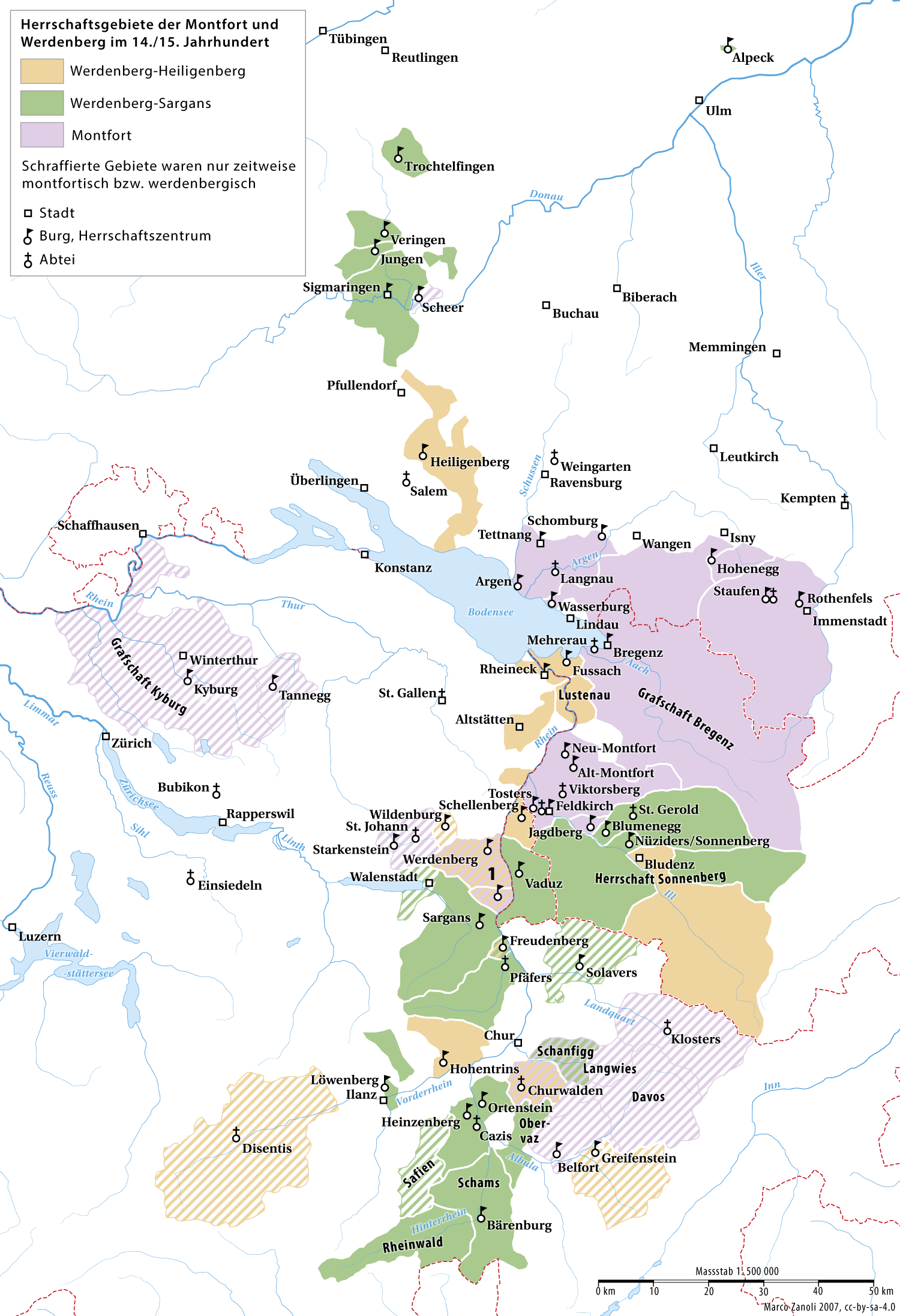
Territories of the counts of Werdenberg, Werdenberg-Sargans and Montfort in the 14th century

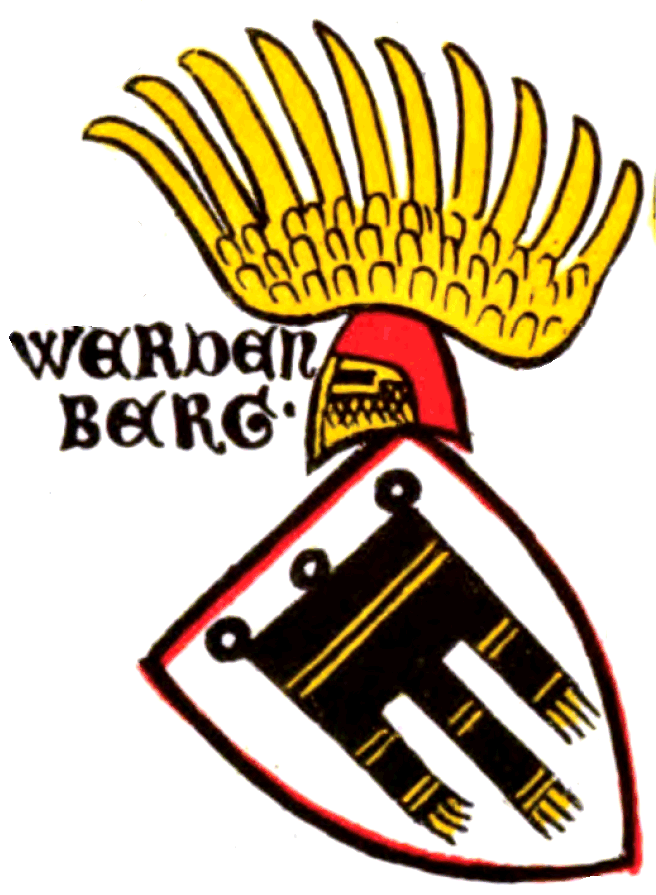
Coat of arms from the Zürich armorial. The heraldic charge is a Gonfanon, derived from that of the Tübingen and Montfort coats of arms.

Werdenberg was a county of the Holy Roman Empire, within the Duchy of Swabia, situated on either side of the Alpine Rhine, including parts of what is now St. Gallen (Switzerland), Liechtenstein, and Vorarlberg (Austria). It was partitioned from Montfort in 1230. In 1260, it was divided into Werdenberg and Sargans.

== History ==
It is named for Werdenberg Castle, today located in the municipality of Grabs in the Swiss canton of St. Gallen, seat of the counts of Werdenberg (Werdenberger), The family was descended from count Hugo II of Tübingen (d. 1180), who married Elisabeth, daughter of the last count of Bregenz, thus inheriting substantial territory along the Alpine Rhine. His son was Hugo I of Montfort (d. 1228), whose son Rudolf I is considered the founder of the Werdenberg line. Rudolf's sons Hugo I of Werdenberg-Heiligenberg and Hartmann I of Werdenberg divided the southern territory of the Montfort inheritance, establishing the two lines of Werdenberg-Heiligenberg and Werdenberg-Sargans.

In 1308 Werdenberg was further divided into Werdenberg-Heiligenberg (Linzgau) and Werdenberg-Werdenberg. The Vaduz line of Counts of Werdenberg died out in 1406 and Vaduz passed to the Barons of Brandis.

The family fractured further into a number of cadet branches. The line of Werdenberg-Heiligenberg-Sigmaringen-Trochtelfingen remained influential in the early 16th century in the context of the Swabian League but was extinct in 1534.

The Werdenberg feud (Werdenbergfehde) was a major series of feuds between the Werdenberg and their neighbours in the late 15th century, most notably their conflict with the von Zimmern family of Swabia. The feud between the lords of Werdenberg and of Zimmern escalated in 1488, rising to an importance above merely regional concerns, influencing the imperial policy of Frederick III and Maximilian I regarding the formation of the Swabian League, the Imperial Reforms and the history of the Old Swiss Confederacy.

== Counts of Werdenberg ==
Below, a list of the counts of Werdenberg, numbered by order of ascension:

=== House of Tübingen ===
==== Partitions of Werdenberg under Tübingen rule ====
County of Werdenberg (1230-1247)
			County of Sargans (1st creation) (1247-1396)	County of Vaduz (1322-1416)
			County of Sargans (1st creation) (1247-1396)	County of Vaduz (1322-1416)	County of Alpeck (1322-1383)	County of Trochtelfingen (1332-1534)
County of Werdenberg or Heiligenberg (1247-1402)	County of Bludenz (1373-1394)	County of Rheineck (1373-1395)	County of Sargans (1st creation) (1247-1396)	County of Vaduz (1322-1416)	County of Alpeck (1322-1383)	County of Trochtelfingen (1332-1534)
			County of Sargans (1st creation) (1247-1396)	County of Vaduz (1322-1416)	Annexed to Ulm	County of Trochtelfingen (1332-1534)
	Annexed to Austria		Pawned to the Counts of Toggenburg	County of Vaduz (1322-1416)	Annexed to Ulm	County of Trochtelfingen (1332-1534)
Pawned to the Counts of Montfort until 1485, then annexed by Switzerland	Annexed to Austria		Pawned to the Counts of Toggenburg	County of Vaduz (1322-1416)	Annexed to Ulm	County of Trochtelfingen (1332-1534)
Pawned to the Counts of Montfort until 1485, then annexed by Switzerland	Annexed to Austria		Pawned to the Counts of Toggenburg	Passed to the Lords of Brandis	Annexed to Ulm	County of Trochtelfingen (1332-1534)
Pawned to the Counts of Montfort until 1485, then annexed by Switzerland	Annexed to Austria		County of Sargans (2nd creation) (1436-1483)	Passed to the Lords of Brandis	Annexed to Ulm	County of Trochtelfingen (1332-1534)
Pawned to the Counts of Montfort until 1485, then annexed by Switzerland	Annexed to Austria		Annexed by Switzerland	Passed to the Lords of Brandis	Annexed to Ulm	County of Trochtelfingen (1332-1534)
Pawned to the Counts of Montfort until 1485, then annexed by Switzerland	Annexed to Austria		Annexed by Switzerland	Passed to the Lords of Brandis	Annexed to Ulm	Divided between Fürstenberg and Austria (1534) and then Hohenzollern (1535)

==== Table of rulers ====
(Note: Here the numbering of the counts is the same for all counties, as all were titled Counts of Werdenberg, despite the different parts of land or particular numbering of the rulers. The counts are numbered by the year of their succession.)

Ruler	Born	Reign	Death	Ruling part	Consort	Notes
Rudolph I	c.1190	1230-1244/7/8	September 1244, 7 October 1247 or 19 May 1248	Montfort	Clementia of Kyburg c.1230 six children	Abdicated from Montfort to inherit Werdenberg. For his brother's descendants see Counts of Montfort. After his death Werdenberg was divided.
Hartmann I	c.1230	1244/7/8-1271	3 April 1271	Werdenberg-Sargans	Elisabeth of Ortenburg; 26 June 1256 or 11 July 1258 three children	Son of Rudolph I, inherited Sargans.
Hugo I	1231	1247-1280	7 December 1280	Werdenberg-Heiligenberg	Matilda of Neuffen; 11 February 1263 six children	Son of Rudolph I, inherited Heiligenberg.
Hugo II the One-Eyed	c.1265	1280-1305/7	25 March 1305/7	Werdenberg-Heiligenberg	Euphemia of Ortenburg; 3 June 1281 eleven children	
Rudolph II	c.1257	1271-1323	18 March 1323	Werdenberg-Sargans	Adelaide of Burgau; 1282 five children	Sons of Hartmann I, probably ruled jointly. Hugo became Knight Hospitaller, and Hartmann a canon at Bamberg.
Hugo III	c.1260	1271-1323	After 1332	Werdenberg-Sargans	Unmarried	Sons of Hartmann I, probably ruled jointly. Hugo became Knight Hospitaller, and Hartmann a canon at Bamberg.
Hartmann II	c.1260	1271-c.1282?	After 1282	Werdenberg-Sargans	Unmarried	Sons of Hartmann I, probably ruled jointly. Hugo became Knight Hospitaller, and Hartmann a canon at Bamberg.
Albert I	c.1283	1307-1365	16 May 1364 or 1 October 1367	Werdenberg-Heiligenberg	Catherine of Habsburg-Kyburg c.1330 three children	Sons of Hugo II, ruled jointly.
Hugo IV Cocles	c.1280	1307-1329/34	16 August 1329 or 16 October 1334	Werdenberg-Heiligenberg	Anna of Wildenberg; 1320 (bef. 1 April) no children	Sons of Hugo II, ruled jointly.
Henry I	c.1280	1307-1323	16 October 1323	Werdenberg-Heiligenberg	Unmarried	Sons of Hugo II, ruled jointly.
Rudolph III	c.1293	1323-1325	1325	Werdenberg-Sargans	Unmarried	Sons of Rudolph II, ruled jointly. Rudolph IV assume alone the rulership of Sargans after the death of his older brother and namesake. In 1338, after the death of Count Donat of Vaz, he could inherit a part of his domains, as husband of Ursula.
Rudolph IV	c.1310	1323-1361	21 January or 15 March 1361	Werdenberg-Sargans	Ursula of Vaz; 15 August 1337 one child	Sons of Rudolph II, ruled jointly. Rudolph IV assume alone the rulership of Sargans after the death of his older brother and namesake. In 1338, after the death of Count Donat of Vaz, he could inherit a part of his domains, as husband of Ursula.
Hartmann III	c.1300	1323-1353/55	15 July 1353 or 21 May 1355	Werdenberg-Vaduz	Agnes of Montfort-Feldkirch before 1354 three children	Son of Rudolph II, inherited Vaduz.
Henry II	c.1300	1323-1332/34	2 March 1332 or 27 June 1334	Werdenberg-Alpeck	Agnes of Württemberg c.1317 six children	Son of Rudolph II, inherited Alpeck. After his death, the county was once more divided.
Eberhard I	c.1315?	1332/34-1383	27/8 May 1383	Werdenberg-Trochtelfingen	Luitgard of Berg-Schelklingen c.1335 no children Sophie of Geroldseck after 1344 one child	Sons of Henry II, inherited Trochtelfingen, where they ruled together. Hugo became Knight Hospitaller.
Hugo V	c.1315?	1332/4-1373	16 February 1373	Werdenberg-Trochtelfingen	Unmarried	Sons of Henry II, inherited Trochtelfingen, where they ruled together. Hugo became Knight Hospitaller.
Rudolph V	c.1315?	1332/4-1342/9	c.1345	Werdenberg-Trochtelfingen	Unmarried	Sons of Henry II, inherited Trochtelfingen, where they ruled together. Hugo became Knight Hospitaller.
Henry III	c.1315?	1332/34-1366/70	14 March 1366/70	Werdenberg-Alpeck	Bertha of Kirchberg I before 1352 two children	Son of Henry II, kept Alpeck.
Henry IV	c.1320	1353/5-1397	23 January 1397	Werdenberg-Vaduz	Katharina of Werdenberg-Heiligenberg-Bludenz before 1395 no children	Sons of Hartmann III, probably ruled jointly. In 1389 Hartmann IV became Bishop at Chur.
Rudolph VI	c.1320	1353/5-1365/7	7 July 1365/7	Werdenberg-Vaduz	Unmarried	Sons of Hartmann III, probably ruled jointly. In 1389 Hartmann IV became Bishop at Chur.
Hartmann IV	c.1320	1353/5-1389	6 September 1416	Werdenberg-Vaduz	Unmarried	Sons of Hartmann III, probably ruled jointly. In 1389 Hartmann IV became Bishop at Chur.
John I	c.1340	1361-1396	16 October 1400	Werdenberg-Sargans	Anna of Rhazuns (I); 5 April 1367 one child	In 1396, highly endebted, John pawned Sargans to the Habsburgs, who resold it to the Counts of Toggenburg.
In 1396 Sargans was annexed to the County of Toggenburg
Albert II	c.1330	1365-1371/3	22 July 1371 or 6 January 1373	Werdenberg-Heiligenberg	Matilda of Montfort-Tettnang c.1322 one child Agnes of Nuremberg; 3 August 1343 or 5 July 1344 five children	Son of Albert I. After his death, the county was once more divided.
Henry V	c.1350	1366-1383	c.1390	Werdenberg-Alpeck	Elisabeth of Oettingen two children Agnes of Helfenstein no children	In 1383 sold his county to the city of Ulm.
In 1383 Alpeck was annexed to Ulm
Albert III the Elder	c.1360	1371/3-1394	23 February 1418/20	Werdenberg-Heiligenberg-Bludenz	Ursula of Schaunberg c.1383 six children	Son of Albert II, received Bludenz. In 1394 he sold his lands to the Habsburgs.
In 1394 Bludenz was annexed to Austria
Henry VI	c.1364	1371/3-1392/3	24 December 1392 or 24 July 1393	Werdenberg-Heiligenberg-Rheineck	Anna of Montfort-Feldkirch c.1375 four children	Sons of Albert II, possibly ruled jointly in Rheineck
Hugo VI	c.1360	1371/3-1387/90	1 November 1387 or 15 March 1390	Werdenberg-Heiligenberg-Rheineck	Bertha of Kirchberg II c.1375 four children	Sons of Albert II, possibly ruled jointly in Rheineck
Albert IV the Younger	c.1360	1371/3-1402	30 July 1416 or 4 May 1418	Werdenberg-Heiligenberg	Agnes of Montfort-Bregenz c.1380 no children	Son of Albert II, kept Heiligenberg. In 1402 his lands were pawned to his cousins, the Counts of Montfort.
In 1402 Heiligenberg was annexed to Montfort, and in 1485 to Switzerland
Henry VII	c.1360?	1383-1393	1393	Werdenberg-Trochtelfingen	Agnes of Teck; 1370 one child Ida of Toggenburg before 1392 no children	Sons of Eberhard I, ruled jointly.
Eberhard II	c.1360?	1383	1383	Werdenberg-Trochtelfingen	Unmarried	Sons of Eberhard I, ruled jointly.
Hugo VII	c.1380	1392-1395	c.1428	Werdenberg-Heiligenberg-Rheineck	Agnes of Abensberg c.1399 no children	Son of Henry VI, ruled jointly with his brothers Rudolph and Henry, but the trio lost their lands to the Habsburgs in 1395. However, Hugo was able to recover power by inheriting his cousin's county of Vaduz, losing it, however, in 1416, to the Lords of Brandis.
Hugo VII	c.1380	1397-1416	c.1428	Werdenberg-Heiligenberg-Vaduz	Agnes of Abensberg c.1399 no children	Son of Henry VI, ruled jointly with his brothers Rudolph and Henry, but the trio lost their lands to the Habsburgs in 1395. However, Hugo was able to recover power by inheriting his cousin's county of Vaduz, losing it, however, in 1416, to the Lords of Brandis.
In 1416 Vaduz was annexed to the Lordship of Brandis, and, after many inheritances, eventually became part of Liechtenstein in 1699.
Rudolph VII	c.1388	1392-1395	c.1419	Werdenberg-Heiligenberg-Rheineck	Beatrix of Fürstenberg-Haslach c.1399 no children	Brothers of Hugo VII, co-ruled with him in Rheineck.
Henry IX	?	1392-1395	1401	Werdenberg-Heiligenberg-Rheineck	Unmarried	Brothers of Hugo VII, co-ruled with him in Rheineck.
In 1395 Rheineck was annexed to Austria
Eberhard III	c.1380?	1393-1416	1416	Werdenberg-Trochtelfingen	Anna of Zimmern six children	
Eberhard IV	c.1400?	1416-1475	1475	Werdenberg-Trochtelfingen	Unmarried	Sons of Eberhard III, ruled jointly.
John IV	c.1400?	1416-1465	27 April 1465	Werdenberg-Trochtelfingen	Elisabeth of Württemberg; 1430 seven children	Sons of Eberhard III, ruled jointly.
Henry XI	c.1400?	1416-1439	1439	Werdenberg-Trochtelfingen	Unmarried	Sons of Eberhard III, ruled jointly.
In 1436, with the extinction of the Toggenburgs, Sargans returned to Werdenberg family.
Henry X	c.1385	1436-1447	1447	Werdenberg-Sargans	Agnes of Matsch before or c.1440 four children	Son of John I, he was restored to the county.
William II	before or c.1440?	1447-1467	1467	Werdenberg-Sargans	Erentrude of Stauffen no children	Left no descendants. He was succeeded by his brother.
George II	c.1442	1467-1483	23 February 1504	Werdenberg-Sargans	Anna of Rhazuns (II) before 1461 no children Barbara of Waldburg-Sonnenburg; 1463 (June-September) no children	Left no descendants. Highly endebted, sold the county to the Swiss Confederation.
In 1483 Sargans was definitely annexed to Switzerland
Hugo XI	c.1450?	1475-1508	8 August 1508	Werdenberg-Trochtelfingen	Unmarried	Sons of John IV, ruled jointly. John V became Bishop at Augsburg.
George III	c.1450?	1475-1500	12 March 1500	Werdenberg-Trochtelfingen	Katharina of Baden; 1464 seven children	Sons of John IV, ruled jointly. John V became Bishop at Augsburg.
Ulrich	c.1450?	1475-1503	17 July 1503	Werdenberg-Trochtelfingen	Unmarried	Sons of John IV, ruled jointly. John V became Bishop at Augsburg.
Rudolph X	c.1450?	1475-1505	2 September 1505	Werdenberg-Trochtelfingen	Unmarried	Sons of John IV, ruled jointly. John V became Bishop at Augsburg.
Henry XII	c.1450?	1475-1505	1505	Werdenberg-Trochtelfingen	Unmarried	Sons of John IV, ruled jointly. John V became Bishop at Augsburg.
John V	c.1450?	1475-1486	1486	Werdenberg-Trochtelfingen	Unmarried	Sons of John IV, ruled jointly. John V became Bishop at Augsburg.
Christoph	1494	1508-1534	29 January 1534	Werdenberg-Trochtelfingen	Eleonora Gonzaga; 1500 one child Johanna van Borselen no children	Sons of George II, ruled jointly.
Felix	c.1495	1508-1530	12 July 1530	Werdenberg-Trochtelfingen	Elisabeth of Neuchâtel no children	Sons of George II, ruled jointly.
John VI	c.1495	1508-1522	8 July 1522	Werdenberg-Trochtelfingen	Katharina of Gundelfingen no children	Sons of George II, ruled jointly.
In 1534 Trochtelfingen became divided between Fürstenberg and Austria, but was annexed to Hohenzollern in the following year.

=== Successor houses in Werdenberg-Vaduz ===
(Note: Numbering restarts)

==== House of Brandis ====
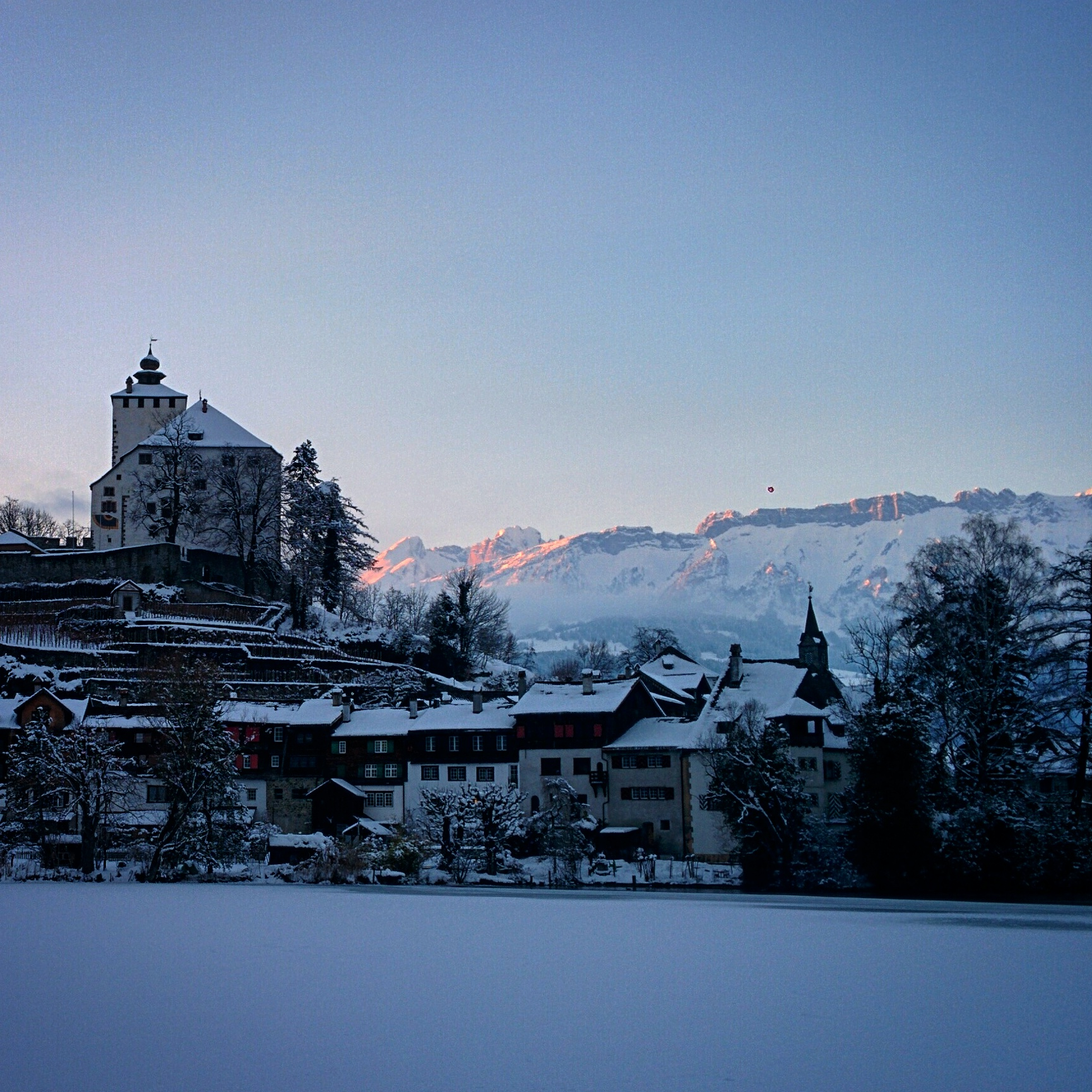
Werdenberg Castle

- 1416-1456: Wolfhard, son-in-law of Albert III the Elder;
- 1456-1486: Ulrich;
- 1486-1507: Ludwig and Sigismund, brothers.

==== House of Sulz ====
- 1507-1535: Rudolf I, maternal grandson of Ulrich of Brandis;
- 1535-1556: John Louis;
- 1556-1569: William and Alwig, brothers;
- 1569-1572: Alwig;
- 1572-1611: Rudolf II;
- 1611-1613: John, sold Vaduz to the House of Hohenems.

==== House of Hohenems ====
- 1613-1640: Kaspar;
- 1640-1646: Jacob Hannibal;
- 1646-1662: Franz Wilhelm I;
- 1662-1686: Ferdinand Carl;
- 1686-1691: Jacob Hannibal Frederick and Franz Wilhelm II, brothers;
- 1691-1712: Jacob Hannibal Frederick, with Franz Wilhelm III (son of Franz Wilhelm I);
- 1712: To the Prince of Liechtenstein.

== See also ==
- County of Vaduz
- Lordship of Schellenberg
