= Andreas Walch =

Liechtenstein army officer (1824–1896)

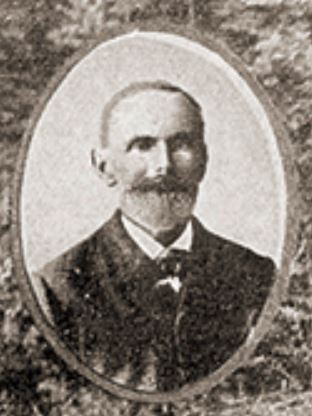
- Born: 2 February 1824; Ruggell, Liechtenstein
- Died: 24 January 1896 (aged 71); Vaduz, Liechtenstein
- Spouse: Maria Anna Seger (m. 1856)
- Children: 14
- Military career
- Allegiance: Liechtenstein
- Service years: 1844–1868
- Conflicts: Baden Revolution; Austro-Prussian War

Andreas Walch (2 February 1824 – 24 January 1896) was a bricklayer and feldwebel in the Liechtenstein military.

== Life ==
Walch was born on 2 February 1824 in Ruggell as the son of Lorenz Walch and his mother Maria Magdalena Batliner as one of five children.

Walch worked as a bricklayer before in 1844 he joined the Liechtenstein military, where he was promoted to corporal in 1846 then sergeant in 1849 and feldwebel in 1852. He was involved in the military action to crush the revolution during the Baden Revolution in 1849. From 1859, together with Peter Rheinberger, he oversaw its reorganisation and the administrative running of the military. Walch served in the Austro-Prussian War of 1866, in which the military took up position on the Stilfser Joch in the south of Liechtenstein to defend the Liechtenstein/Austrian border against attacks by the Italians under Giuseppe Garibaldi. When the war ended on 22 July the military marched home to a ceremonial welcome in Vaduz.

After the German Confederation dissolved in 1866, in combination with its unpopularity among the population due to the 1866 war and the rising cost to maintain it, Liechtenstein disbanded its army of 80 men on 12 February 1868 and declared its permanent neutrality. In 1893 the former soldiers of the Liechtenstein army founded a veterans association, of which Walch was decided as chairman at Peter Rheinberger's funeral. The association had 141 members in 1896.

== Personal life ==
Walch married Maria Anna Seger (1 September 1831 – 10 June 1911) in 1856 and they had fourteen children together. He died on 24 January 1896, aged 71.
