= Trochtelfingen =

- Town
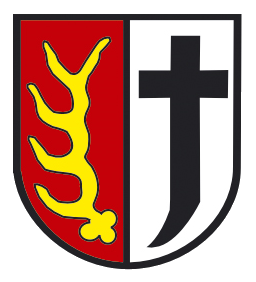
- Coat of arms

- Location of Trochtelfingen within Reutlingen district
- Interactive map of Trochtelfingen
- Location within Germany Location within Baden-Württemberg
- Coordinates: 48°18′29″N 09°14′40″E
- Country: Germany
- State: Baden-Württemberg
- Admin. region: Tübingen
- District: Reutlingen

Government
  - Mayor (2023–31): Katja Fischer (SPD)

Area
  - Total: 79.2 km^{2} (30.6 sq mi)
- Elevation: 700 m (2,300 ft)

Population (2025-12-31)
  - Total: 6,254
  - Density: 79.0/km^{2} (205/sq mi)
- Time zone: UTC+01:00 (CET)
  - Summer (DST): UTC+02:00 (CEST)
- Postal codes: 72814–72818
- Dialling codes: 07124, 07388
- Vehicle registration: RT
- Website: www.trochtelfingen.de

Trochtelfingen (German pronunciation: [ˈtʁɔxtl̩ˌfɪŋən]) is a town in the district of Reutlingen, Baden-Württemberg, Germany. It is situated 20 km south of Reutlingen.
