= Andreas Kieber =

Liechtenstein soldier (1844–1939)

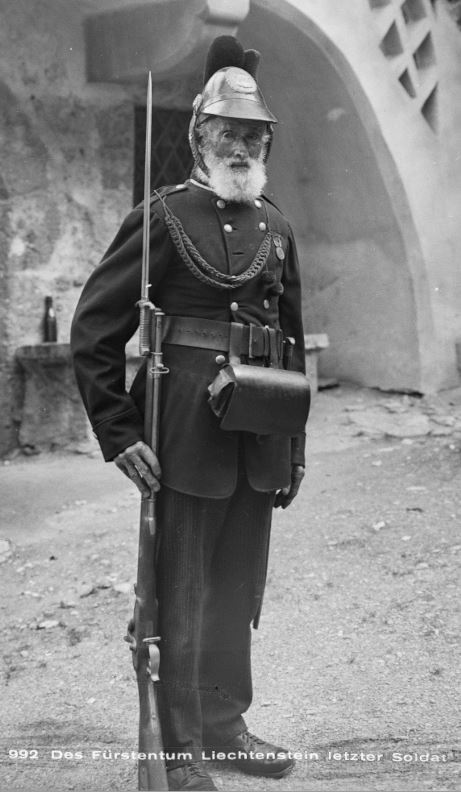
- Kieber in the courtyard of Vaduz Castle in uniform, around 1935
- Born: 4 October 1844; Mauren, Liechtenstein
- Died: 19 April 1939 (aged 94) Mauren, Liechtenstein
- Allegiance: Liechtenstein
- Service years: 1866–1868
- Conflicts: Austro-Prussian War
- Spouse: Rosina Marxer (m. 1873; died 1920)
- Children: 5

Andreas Kieber (4 October 1844 – 19 April 1939) was a farmer and soldier from Liechtenstein. He was a veteran of the Austro-Prussian War and the last surviving member of the Liechtenstein military.

== Life ==
Kieber was born on 4 October 1844 in Mauren, as one of two children to Michael Kieber and Crescent Senti.

He worked as a farmer; in 1866, upon the outbreak of the Austro-Prussian War, he was a soldier who was a member of the 80-man Liechtenstein contingent led by Peter Rheinberger that was deployed on the Stelvio Pass against Italy, although the unit did not see any action. He remained in the military until it was disbanded in 1868 due to its unpopularity within the country, after which Liechtenstein declared its permanent neutrality. He was a member of the Liechtenstein veterans association, which was founded in 1893 and consisted of 141 members in 1896.

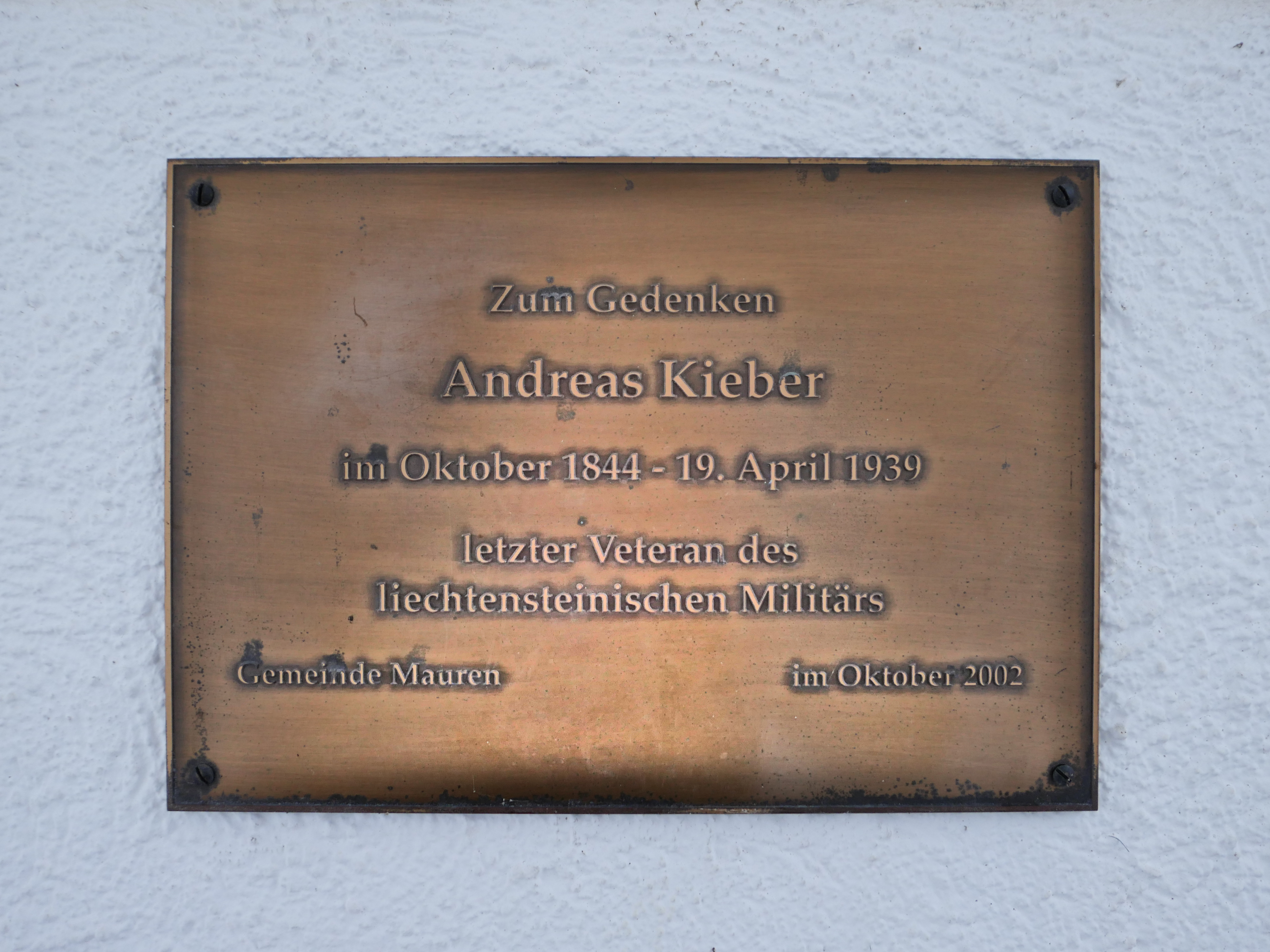
Commentative plaque at the entrance of the Mauren cemetery.

In his later years, he was honoured with photographs of him in his uniform which were used in various postcards. Kieber died on 19 April 1939 in Mauren, aged 94 years old. Upon his death, he was recognised as the last surviving member of the Liechtenstein military and nicknamed the "last Liechtenstein soldier".

Kieber married Rosina Marxer (29 July 1848 – 20 April 1920) on 3 November 1873 and they had five children together.

== See also ==
- Military history of Liechtenstein
