= Lordship of Schellenberg =

Historic state of the Holy Roman Empire

Lordship of Schellenberg Herrschaft Schellenberg
- 9th century – 1719
- Flag Coat of arms

- Map of Liechtenstein highlighting the current electoral district of Unterland (red), coextensive with the Lordship of Schellenberg
- Status: Lordship
- Capital: Schellenberg, Vaduz; 47°14′0.98″N 9°32′53.01″E
- Common languages: German
- Historical era: Middle Ages
  - County created by Charlemagne: 9th century
  - Purchased by Counts of Vaduz: 1437
  - Acquired, with Vaduz, by Austria: 1499
  - Liechtenstein dynasty become Fürsten: 1706
  - Acquired by Liechtenstein dynasty: 1719
Preceded by	Succeeded by
Raetia	Liechtenstein
- Today part of: Liechtenstein

The Lordship of Schellenberg (German: Herrschaft Schellenberg) was a historic state of the Holy Roman Empire, now located in the Principality of Liechtenstein. Its capital was the town of Schellenberg.

== Geography ==
Located north of the County of Vaduz, its area corresponds to the current electoral district of Unterland (German: Wahlkreis Unterland). The territory included the current municipalities of Eschen, Gamprin, Mauren, Ruggell and Schellenberg.

== History ==
The lordship was constituted in the 9th century by Charlemagne, and purchased to the Counts of Vaduz in 1437, becoming de facto a dependency united to the County of Vaduz. After the Swabian War in 1499, both came under Austrian suzerainty. Different dynasties of counts bought and sold them, until their purchase in 1699 by Hans-Adam I, Prince of Liechtenstein, for 115,000 guilders; he had been granted princely status in 1706, but needed to acquire a territory with imperial immediacy in order to vote in the Diet of the Princes of the Empire. In 1712, the Liechtenstein dynasty also purchased the nearby County of Vaduz, for 290,000 guilders. The Holy Roman Emperor Charles VI, formally united Vaduz and Schellenberg in 1719 as the Principality of Liechtenstein.

== See also ==
- County of Werdenberg
- History of Liechtenstein
