= County of Vaduz =

State of the Holy Roman Empire (1342–1719)

County of Vaduz Grafschaft Vaduz
- 1342–1719
- Coat of arms

- Map of Liechtenstein highlighting the current electoral district of Oberland (red), coextensive with the County of Vaduz
- Status: County
- Capital: Vaduz; 47.141°N 9.521°E
- Common languages: German
- Historical era: Middle Ages
  - Subdivision of the County of Werdenberg: 1342
  - Established: 1342
  - Acquired by Liechtenstein dynasty: 1719

Area
  - Total: 125.5 km^{2} (48.5 sq mi)
Preceded by	Succeeded by
Werdenberg (Holy Roman Empire)	Liechtenstein
- Today part of: Liechtenstein

The County of Vaduz (German: Grafschaft Vaduz) was a historic state of the Holy Roman Empire, now located in the Principality of Liechtenstein. Its capital was the town of Vaduz.

== Geography ==
Located south of the Lordship of Schellenberg, its area corresponds to the current electoral district of Oberland (German: Wahlkreis Oberland). The territory included the current municipalities of Balzers, Planken, Schaan, Triesen, Triesenberg and Vaduz.

== History ==
The county was created in 1342, after the subdivision of the County of Werdenberg. In 1396 it was granted the imperial immediacy (German: Reichsunmittelbarkeit). After the line of succession of the Counts of Vaduz expired in 1416 with the death of Hartmann IV, the territory was passed to the Barons of Brandis, who were relatives of the last Count of Vaduz. The Barons of Brandis ruled until 1507, when the county was sold to the related Counts of Sulz, who acquired the northern and bordering Lordship of Schellenberg.

In 1613 both territories, while remaining distinct, were sold to the counts of Hohenems (see Hohenems family). Ferdinand Karl von Hohenems (1650–1686), for undue appropriation and excessive witch-hunt, was deprived of his dominions in 1684 by the Emperor Leopold I. The emperor assigned Ferdinand Karl's former possessions to his younger brother, Count Jakob Hannibal III (1653–1730). To pay his debts and recover Hohenems itself, Jakob Hannibal was forced to sell the Lordship (in 1699), and the County (in 1712), to Hans-Adam I, Prince of Liechtenstein. With these territories, in 1719 the prince gained from the Holy Roman Emperor Charles VI the right to found a single state, the present Principality of Liechtenstein.

== See also ==
- History of Liechtenstein
