= Peter Rheinberger =

Liechtenstein captain and politician (1831–1893)

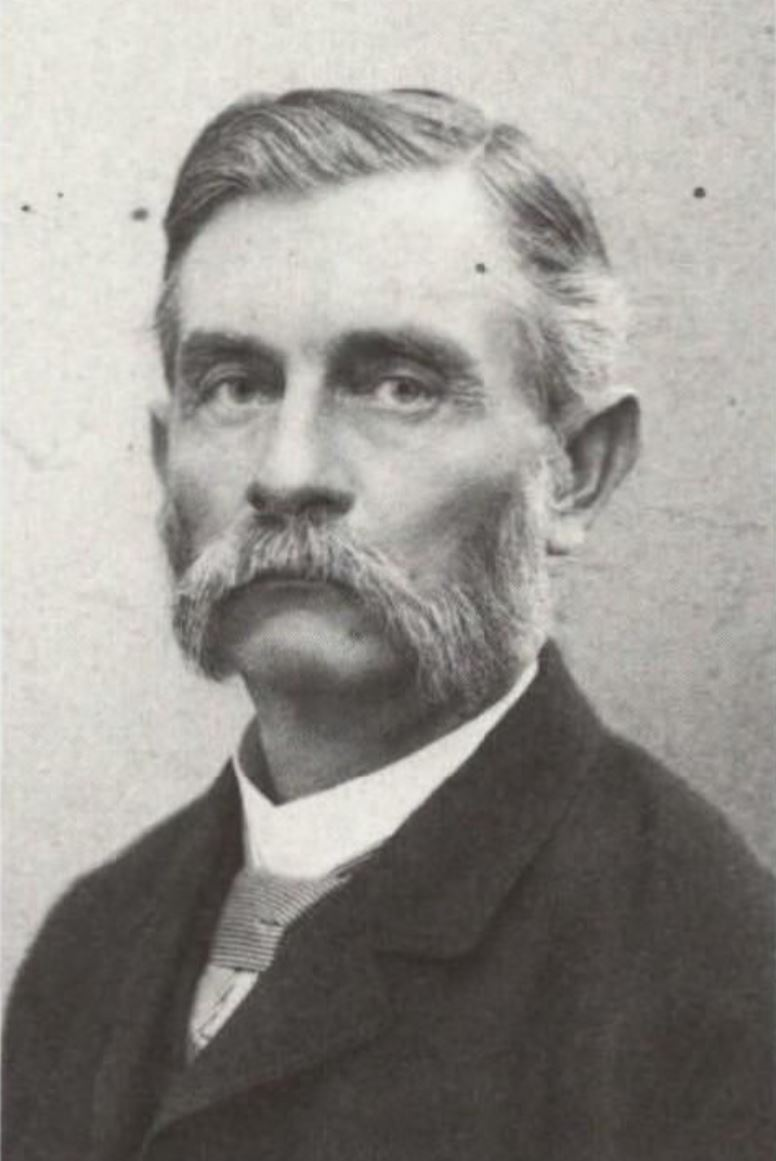

Personal details
- Born: 3 January 1831 Vaduz, Liechtenstein
- Died: 19 October 1893 (aged 62) Vaduz, Liechtenstein
- Spouse: Theresia Rheinberger (m. 1863)
- Children: 4, including Hermine Rheinberger
- Relatives: Josef Rheinberger (brother)

Military service
- Allegiance: Liechtenstein
- Years of service: 1848–1855; 1859–1868
- Rank: Captain
- Battles/wars: Baden Revolution; Austro-Prussian War

Peter Rheinberger (3 January 1831 – 19 October 1893) was an engineer and captain in the Liechtenstein military. He later became a political figure and served in the Landtag of Liechtenstein. He was a member of the prominent Rheinberger family.

== Early life ==
Rheinberger was born on 3 January 1831 in Vaduz as the son of Johann Peter Rheinberger and Elisabeth Carigiet as one of eleven children, including his brother Josef Rheinberger. He attended school in Chur from 1845 to 1848, where he was taught by Peter Kaiser.

== Military career ==
In 1848 he joined the cadet school in Sigmaringen and then joined the Liechtenstein military. He was promoted to corporal on 1 January 1849 and then to lieutenant on 1 May 1849. He was involved in the military action to crush the revolution during the Baden Revolution in 1849, after which he was stationed in the garrison at Vaduz Castle. When not on military service, Rheinberger studied civil engineering in Munich from 1855 to 1856. He then proceeded to work in the office of railway construction in Chur until 1859, in which he was involved in the building of the Weesen–Schänis railway line.

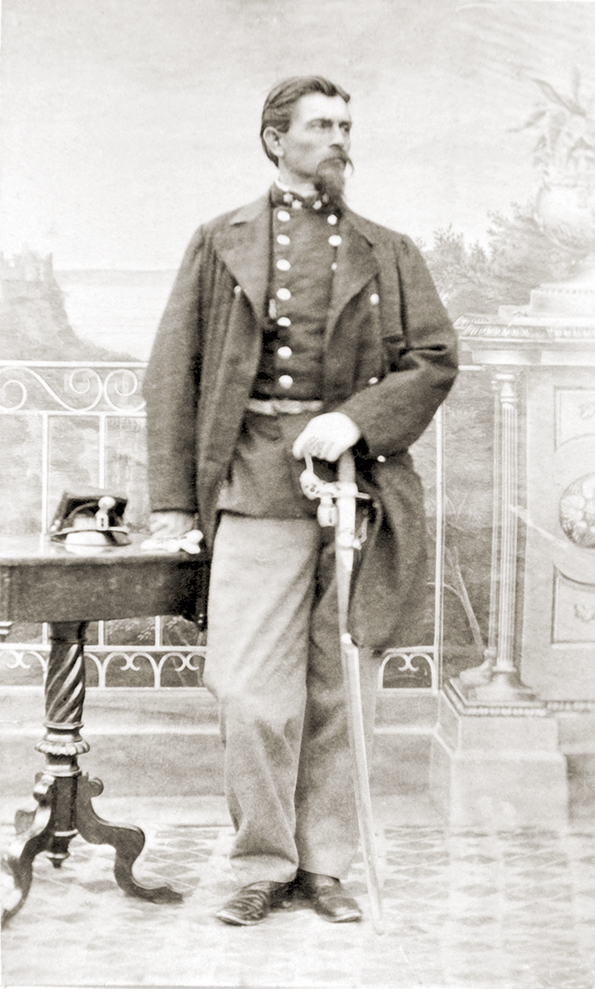
Rheinberger in uniform as first lieutenant around 1860

In 1859, Rheinberger met Johann II in Bonn where he was promoted to first lieutenant and placed in command of the Liechtenstein military on 15 June 1859, being the only Liechtensteiner to hold this position. In this position, along with Andreas Walch, he oversaw its reorganisation and the administrative running of the military. During the Austro-Prussian War of 1866, Johann II placed the military led by Rheinberger at the disposal of the German Confederation but only to “defend the German territory of Tyrol”. However, the war was unpopular among the population and faced resistance from the Landtag of Liechtenstein, as a result the Johann II promised a loan to the country and refused to have his men fight against other Germans. The military took up position on the Stilfser Joch in the south of Liechtenstein to defend the Liechtenstein/Austrian border against attacks by the Italians under Giuseppe Garibaldi. When the war ended on 22 July the military marched home to a ceremonial welcome in Vaduz. Rheinberger was promoted to captain on 1 September 1866.

After the German Confederation dissolved in 1866, in combination with its unpopularity among the population due to the 1866 war and the rising cost to maintain it, Liechtenstein disbanded its army of 80 men on 12 February 1868 and declared its permanent neutrality, in which Rheinberger was discharged. Shortly after his death in 1893, the former soldiers of the Liechtenstein army founded a veterans association, of which Andreas Walch was decided as chairman at Rheinberger's funeral.

== Political career ==
Following the dissolution of the Liechtenstein military in 1868, Rheinberger became the state engineer and technical advisor to the Liechtenstein government. During this time, among over things, it included the building of weirs on the Rhine from Balzers to Ruggell and the building of roads in Liechtenstein, notably the Vaduz–Triesenberg–Sücka road, which was completed in 1868. His work also included building a new building for the Landtag of Liechtenstein, called the Ständehaus included a meeting room, court offices, apartments and a prison. The building served as the meeting place of the Landtag from 1868 to 1905, when it became the state school from 1911 to 1952, then the Vaduz secondary school until 1961 when it was temporarily owned by the Liechtenstein State Library before being demolished in 1970. He alongside Alois Schauer conducted the first survey in Liechtenstein, which included the creation of a new land register.

On four non-consecutive occasions, from 1872 to 1877, 1878 to 1882 and finally from 1886 to 1893 Rheinberger served as a member of the Landtag of Liechtenstein. In this position, he also temporarily served as a member of the finance and state committee. In 1872 he was a member of the delegation that requested for Johann to allow for casinos to be permitted in Liechtenstein, but Johann refused and instead gave an interest-free loan to build a dam on the Rhine.

== Personal life ==
Rheinberger married Theresia Rheinberger (22 June 1834 – 14 January 1901), the sister of Mayor of Vaduz Alois Rheinberger, on 30 June 1863 and they had four children together. His daughter Hermine Rheinberger became Liechtenstein's first female author.

He died on 19 October 1893 in Vaduz, aged 62 years old.
