= Josef Ospelt cabinet =

Governing body of Liechtenstein (1921–1922)

- Government of Liechtenstein

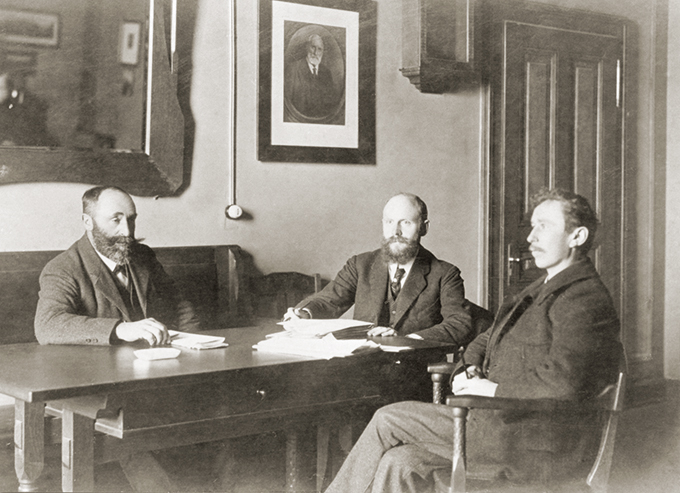
- Ospelt's cabinet in 1921
- Date formed: 23 March 1921
- Date dissolved: 27 April 1922

People and organisations
- Head of state: Johann II
- Head of government: Josef Ospelt (Governor until 5 October 1921)
- Deputy head of government: Alfons Feger
- Total no. of members: 6
- Member parties: FBP; VP

History
- Predecessor: Josef Peer cabinet
- Successor: Gustav Schädler cabinet

The Josef Ospelt cabinet was the governing body of Liechtenstein from 23 March 1921 to 27 April 1922. It was appointed by Johann II and was chaired by Josef Ospelt.

== History ==
Once 6 months had passed since Josef Peer's appointment in March 1921 it was debated whether he should remain as the Governor of Liechtenstein. The Progressive Citizens' Party supported keeping him in office, whereas the Christian-Social People's Party insisted on upholding the previous agreement. It was decided that a referendum would be held to decide if Peer would be kept in office. While 62% voted to keep Peer as Governor, he instead chose to resign the position. As such, the Josef Peer cabinet was disbanded and he was succeeded by Josef Ospelt as Governor.

The government's term was characterized by being responsible for the final stages of Liechtenstein's constitutional revision, which had begun three years earlier following the November 1918 Liechtenstein putsch. Ospelt was a member of the constitutional revision council and on 5 October 1921 he co-signed, along with Prince Karl Aloys the Constitution of Liechtenstein. As a result, the office of Governor was succeeded by Prime Minister of Liechtenstein and Ospelt became its first holder.

Ospelt resigned the position on 27 April 1922 reportedly for health reasons, as such the cabinet was dissolved and was succeeded by his deputy Alfons Feger and then Felix Gubelmann as acting prime minister. The subsequent 1922 Liechtenstein general election resulted in a win for the Christian-Social People's Party, and Gustav Schädler was appointed prime minister succeeding him in the Schädler cabinet.

== Members ==
Picture	Name	Term	Party
Prime Minister
	Josef Ospelt	23 March 1921 – 27 April 1922	Progressive Citizens' Party
Deputy Prime Minister
	Alfons Feger	2 March 1922 – 1 June 1922 (Note: Succeeded Ospelt as acting Prime Minister until June 1.)	Independent
Government councillors
	Felix Gubelmann	1922 – 27 April 1922	Christian-Social People's Party
	Gustav Schädler	2 March 1922 – 27 April 1922	Christian-Social People's Party
	Franz Josef Marxer	23 March 1921 – 1922	Progressive Citizens' Party
	Oskar Bargetze	March 1921 – March 1922	Progressive Citizens' Party

== See also ==
- Politics of Liechtenstein
