= Josef Peer cabinet =

Josef Peer Cabinet
- Cabinet of Liechtenstein

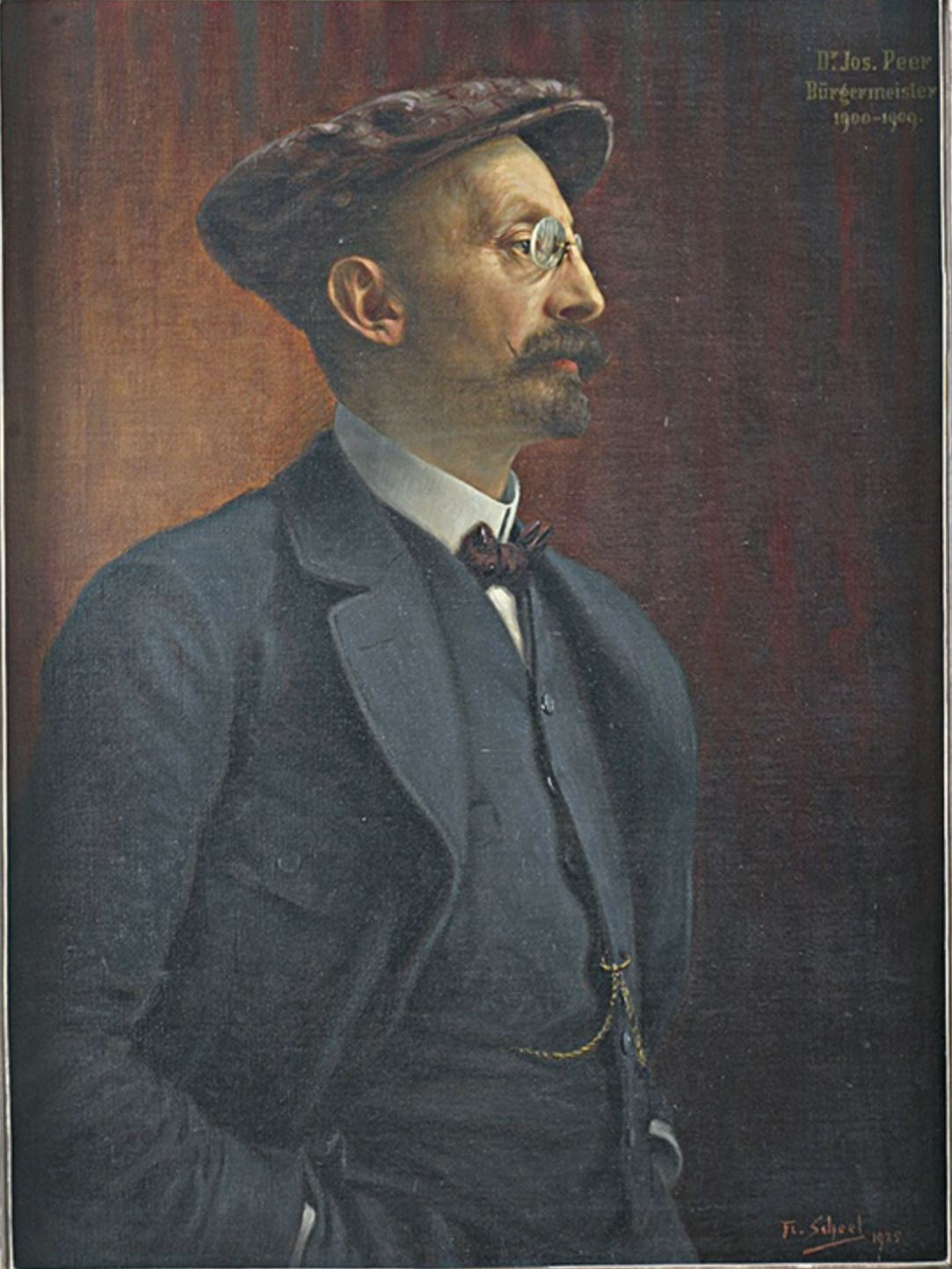
- Josef Peer
- Date formed: 15 September 1920
- Date dissolved: 23 March 1921

People and organisations
- Head of state: Johann II
- Head of government: Josef Peer
- Total no. of members: 2
- Member party: Independent, Progressive Citizens' Party
- Opposition party: Christian-Social People's Party

History
- Election: 1918 election
- Outgoing formation: 1921 referendum
- Predecessor: Aloys cabinet
- Successor: Ospelt cabinet

The Josef Peer cabinet was the governing body of Liechtenstein from 15 September 1920 to 23 March 1921. It was appointed by Johann II and was chaired by Josef Peer.

== History ==
Peer was appointed Governor of Liechtenstein to succeed Prince Karl Aloys. The Progressive Citizens' Party endorsed the appointment, but the Christian Social People's Party was in opposition, mainly due to Peer being Austrian, not Liechtensteiner. A compromise, putting Peer in office for six months, was eventually reached. Peer's government focused on organizing state finances, for example by raising additional revenue through flat-rate tax payments from foreign companies. Domestically, it tried to strengthen the government's authority through stamp-tax regulation.

Once 6 months had passed since his appointment in March 1921 it was debated whether Peer should remain as the Governor of Liechtenstein. The Progressive Citizens' Party supported keeping him in office, whereas the Christian-Social People's Party insisted on upholding the previous agreement. It was decided that a referendum would be held to decide if Peer would be kept in office. While 62% voted to keep Peer as Governor, he instead chose to resign the position. He was succeeded by Josef Ospelt. Shortly after this the Constitution of Liechtenstein was ratified on 5 October 1921 and Ospelt became the Prime Minister of Liechtenstein.

== Members ==
Picture	Name	Term	Party
Governor
	Josef Peer	15 September 1920 – 23 March 1921	Independent
Government councillors
	Oskar Bargetze	15 September 1920 – 23 March 1921	Progressive Citizens' Party
