= 1914 Liechtenstein general election =

- 30 September & 2 October 1914
- 12 seats in the Landtag
President of the Landtag before	President of the Landtag after
Albert Schädler; Independent	Albert Schädler; Independent

General elections were held in Liechtenstein on 30 September 1914 and 2 October 1914 to elect 12 of the 15 members of the Landtag. The twelve seats were indirectly elected by electors selected by voters, while the remaining three were appointed by Johann II, Prince of Liechtenstein.

The election is generally considered the first in Liechtenstein to have "electoral competition" due to the formation of an opposition group around the ideals of Wilhelm Beck and Alois Frick. It was the last election in the country to use the electoral college before the introduction of direct suffrage in the 1918 elections.

== Background and campaign ==
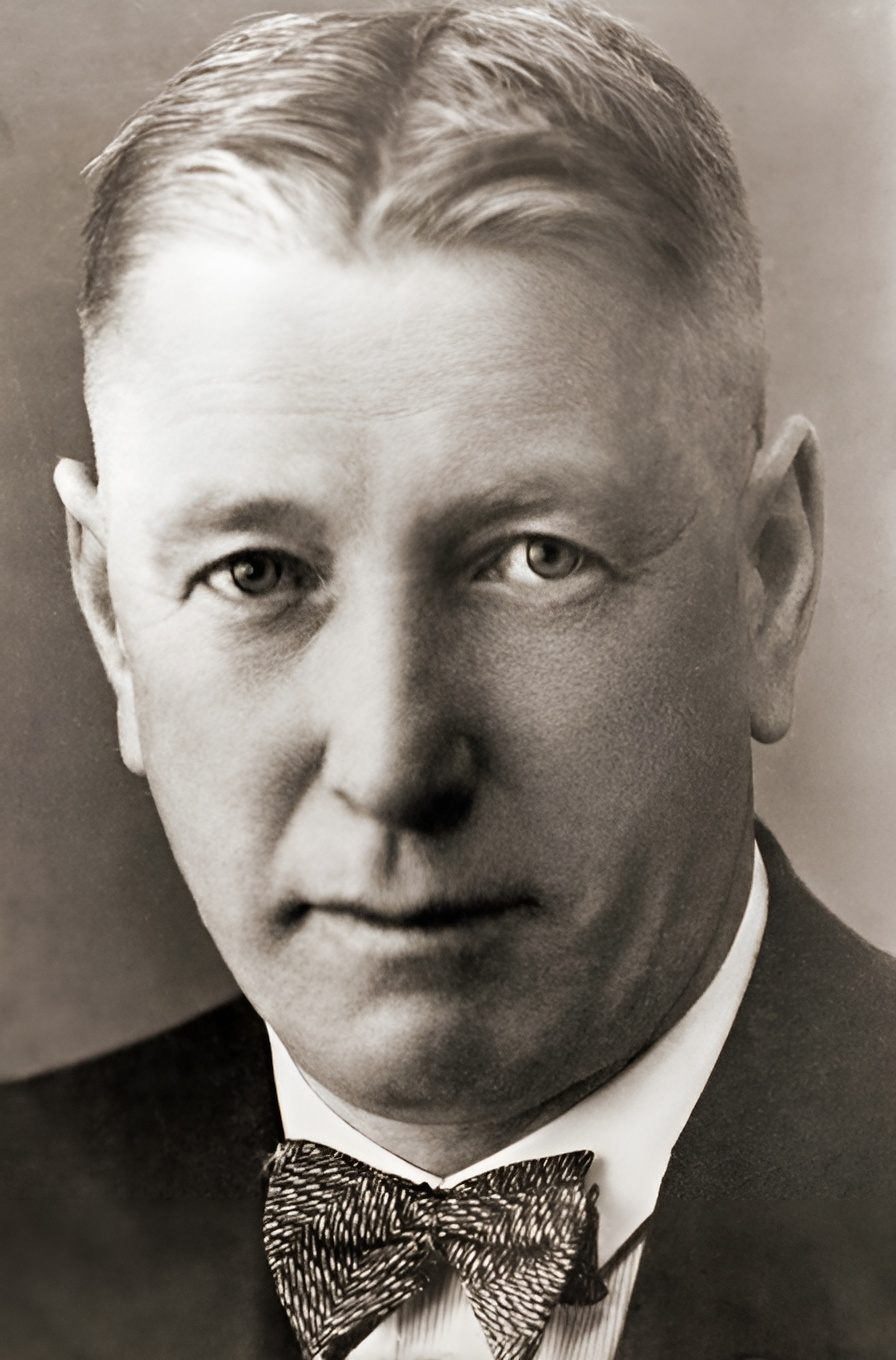
Wilhelm Beck

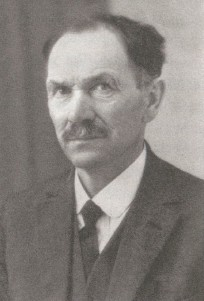
Alois Frick

From 1912 onward, lawyer Wilhelm Beck emerged as a figure in Liechtenstein politics as he criticized the existing structure of Liechtenstein's law, administration, and foreign policy (particularly that of Liechtenstein's customs treaty and closeness to Austria-Hungary). In particular, he criticized the lack of poor relief laws, and considered the 1862 Constitution of Liechtenstein undemocratic.

Beck believed that to facilitate social change in Liechtenstein, members had to be elected to the Landtag to work "for, and not against, the interests of the country and its people." In 1913 he urged his ally Alois Frick to spend the next year garnering support. With the 1914 elections in mind, starting in late 1913 Beck sought to gain support for his cause primarily in the municipalities of Balzers, Triesenberg, and Triesen; he sought to influence enough electors to gain enough votes to have his group win a majority of the seats in the Landtag. In this pursuit, Beck established the newspaper Oberrheinische Nachrichten in April 1914, intended to encourage open discussion of conditions in Liechtenstein. However, a significant amount of the activities at this time were kept in secret, primarily due to Beck distrusting government officials.

Due to the activities of Beck's group, the 1914 election is considered by historian Rupert Quaderer the first to have "electoral competition". In August 1914, the Nachrichten recommended that in addition to "deserving men", "other upright men" who would serve "the little ship of state" should also be elected, believed to encourage the election of newcomers with fresh ideas to the Landtag.

== Electors ==
Elections were held on 9 and 14 September in two electoral districts, Oberland and Unterland, which elected 140 and 76 electors respectively. Each municipality had two electors for every 100 inhabitants. All male citizens aged 24 and above were eligible to vote.

Municipality	Electors	+/–
Balzers	30	+4
Eschen	20	0
Gamprin	8	0
Mauren	24	+2
Planken	2	0
Ruggell	14	+2
Schaan	26	+4
Schellenberg	10	+2
Triesen	26	+2
Triesenberg	28	+4
Vaduz	28	+4
Total	216	+24
Source: Vogt

== Results ==
The election of Oberland's Landtag members and their deputies was held on 30 September in Vaduz. Of the 140 electors, 137 were present for the voting, who elected seven Landtag members and five deputies. The election of Unterland's Landtag members and substitutes was held on 2 October in Mauren. Of the 76 electors, 75 were present for voting, who elected five Landtag members and two deputies.

The Landtag members and their deputies were elected in three ballots, with the remaining three being appointed by Johann II, Prince of Liechtenstein upon the recommendation of the government.

Electoral district	Seats	Electors	Turnout	Ballots	Elected members	Substitutes
Oberland	7	140	137	1st	Wilhelm Beck; Josef Brunhart; Egon Rheinberger; Albert Schädler; Albert Wolfinger	Josef Hilti; Adolf Real
Oberland	7	140	137	2nd	Franz Josef Beck; Josef Sprenger	–
Oberland	7	140	137	3rd	–	Heinrich Brunhart; Josef Gassner; Wendelin Kindle
Unterland	5	76	75	1st	Emil Batliner; Franz Josef Marxer; Johann Wohlwend	Peter Büchel; Josef Hasler
Unterland	5	76	75	2nd	–	–
Unterland	5	76	75	3rd	Johann Hasler; Franz Josef Hoop	–
Source: Vogt

Josef Hilti and Adolf Real declined their elections as deputy members.

== Aftermath ==
In October 1914, the Nachrichten faced accusations by Austrian newspaper Vorarlberger Volksblatt that printed ballot papers had been distributed by Beck supporters in Triesenberg. In response, the Nachrichten argued that electoral law did not require ballots for both the electors and Landtag members to be completed personally, and that a family member could do it. The newspaper Liechtensteiner Volksblatt, the sole newspaper in Liechtenstein before the Nachrichten was founded, also defended the printed ballots.

Beck's opposition group did not achieve its goal of receiving a majority in the Landtag, but it managed to elect four of its members to the Landtag (Beck, Josef Brunhart, Albert Wolfinger, and Josef Sprenger). Through debates and motions, they formed a coherent group in the Landtag, with Brunhart becoming the vice president of the Landtag. However, Brunhart died of a stroke two months later in what was considered a significant blow to the group. He was succeeded by Wendelin Kindle, who also belonged to the opposition group.

Starting from April 1917 the Nachrichten argued for the direct election of the Landtag members. In October, Governor Leopold Freiherr von Imhof unexpectedly supported the program and proposed a reform of the electoral law that would introduce direct suffrage to the country using a majority system. The proposed changes were adopted unanimously by the Landtag on 31 December 1917, ahead of the 1918 elections.

== Literature ==
- Vogt, Paul (1987). 125 Jahre Landtag (in German). Vaduz: Landtag of the Principality of Liechtenstein.
- Quaderer, Rupert (2014). Bewegte Zeiten in Liechtenstein 1914 bis 1926 [Turbulent Times in Liechtenstein 1914–1926] (in German). Vol. 2. Zürich: Liechtenstein Institute, Chronos Verlag. ISBN 978-3-906393-68-1.
