= Prince Karl Aloys cabinet =

Governing body of Liechtenstein (1918–1920)

- Government of Liechtenstein

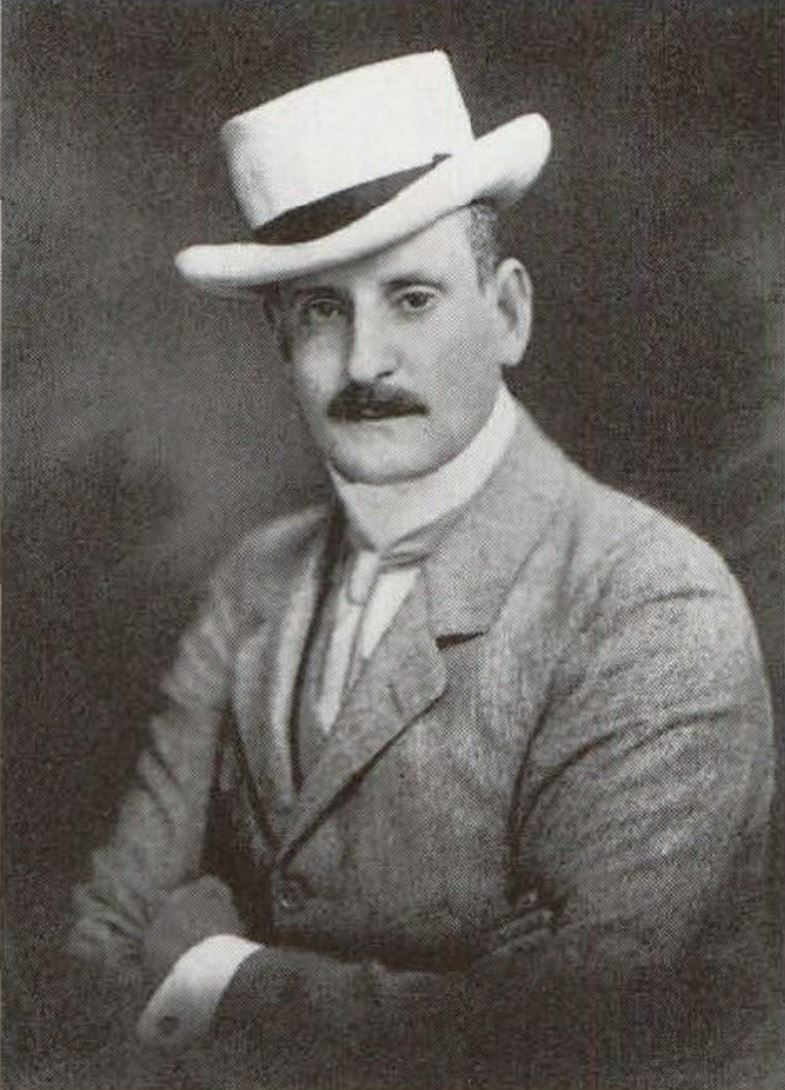
- Date formed: 13 December 1918
- Date dissolved: 15 September 1920

People and organisations
- Head of state: Johann II
- Head of government: Karl Aloys
- Total no. of members: 4
- Member parties: VP; FBP

History
- Predecessor: Provisional Executive Committee
- Successor: Josef Peer cabinet

The Prince Karl Aloys cabinet was the governing body of Liechtenstein from 13 December 1918 to 15 September 1920. It was appointed by Johann II as a compromise government to succeed the Provisional Executive Committee following the November 1918 Liechtenstein putsch, and was chaired by Prince Karl Aloys of Liechtenstein.

== History and legacy ==
Following the November 1918 Liechtenstein putsch, Karl arrived in Vaduz to act as a mediator between the different parties. It was agreed the Provisional Executive Committee formed following the putsch would last one month when a replacement cabinet could be found. On 7 December 1918 it was dissolved, and Karl was appointed as Governor of Liechtenstein by Johann II upon the recommendation of the Landtag of Liechtenstein on 13 December.

During the government's term, Karl appealed to Switzerland in order to begin recovery from the economic devastation World War I brought to the country. As such, Switzerland continued food deliveries to Liechtenstein from 1919 onwards. In addition, he appealed to Felix Calonder to begin negotiations between the two countries for the eventual establishment of a customs union. On 2 August 1919, Liechtenstein disestablished the customs union with Austria and then in October 1919, on its request, Switzerland agreed to represent Liechtenstein's interests abroad where it did not already have representation.

The cabinet also attempted to mediate relations between the Progressive Citizens' Party and Christian Social People's Party regarding the creation of a new constitution, which had been in popular demand since the 1918 putsch. Karl created a draft constitution in April 1920, which made minimal changes to the existing 1862 Constitution of Liechtenstein and it was rejected by the Landtag. Instead, the draft constitution presented by Wilhelm Beck was accepted which limited the power of the prince of Liechtenstein for a constitutional monarchy on a democratic and parliamentary basis, of which were loosely based on the Swiss Federal Constitution.

On 15 September 1920, Josef Peer was appointed Governor by Johann II, which was endorsed by the Progressive Citizens' Party, but faced backlash from the Christian-Social People's Party as they believed the position should only be held by Liechtensteiners. Eventually it was agreed that Peer could take the position, but only for a 6-month period. As a result, the cabinet was dissolved and was succeeded by the Peer cabinet.

== Members ==
Picture	Name	Term	Party
Governor
	Prince Karl Aloys of Liechtenstein	7 November 1918 – 7 December 1918	Independent
Government councillors
	Wilhelm Beck	31 December 1918 – 31 August 1919	Christian-Social People's Party
	Johann Wanger	1 September 1919 – 15 September 1920	Progressive Citizens' Party
	Franz Joseph Marxer	12 November 1918 – 7 December 1918	Progressive Citizens' Party
