= 1989 Liechtenstein referendums =

Referendums for international treaties
For	43.22%
Against	56.78%

Amending the health insurance law
For	59.00%
Against	41.00%

Amending sections of the constitution on control of the justice administration
For	56.52%
Against	43.48%

Amending sections of the constitution on minority rights
For	58.84%
Against	41.16%

Four referendums were held in Liechtenstein during 1989. The first two were held on 19 March and concerned decisions on international treaties and amending the health insurance law. The treaty proposal was rejected by 56.8% of voters, whilst the health insurance law was approved by 59%. The third and fourth referendums were held on 3 December on amending the sections of the constitution regarding the control of the justice administration and minority rights. Both were approved by voters.

== Results ==
=== Introducing referendums on international treaties ===
Choice	Votes	%
For	3,644	43.2
Against	4,787	56.8
Invalid/blank votes	208	–
Total	8,639	100
Registered voters/turnout	13,306	64.9
Source: Nohlen & Stöver

=== Amendment of the health insurance law ===
Choice	Votes	%
For	4,976	59.0
Against	3,458	41.0
Invalid/blank votes	205	–
Total	8,639	100
Registered voters/turnout	13,306	64.9
Source: Nohlen & Stöver

=== Constitutional amendment on control of justice administration ===
Choice	Votes	%
For	3,480	55.1
Against	2,677	42.4
Invalid/blank votes	872	–
Total	7,029	100
Registered voters/turnout	13,425	52.4
Source: Nohlen & Stöver

=== Constitutional amendment on minority rights ===
Choice	Votes	%
For	3,913	58.3
Against	2,737	40.8
Invalid/blank votes	379	–
Total	7,029	100
Registered voters/turnout	13,425	52.4
Source: Nohlen & Stöver
