= Leopold Freiherr von Imhof =

Governor of Liechtenstein from 1914 to 1918

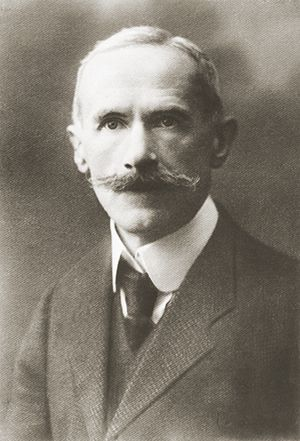
- Imhof in 1918

Governor of Liechtenstein
- In office 1 April 1914 – 13 November 1918
- Monarch: Johann II
- Preceded by: Josef Ospelt
- Succeeded by: Martin Ritter (Chairman of the Provisional Executive Committee)

Personal details
- Born: 7 July 1869 Salzburg, Austria-Hungary
- Died: 30 April 1922 (aged 52) Salzburg, Austria
- Party: Independent
- Spouse: Ida Hoffmann (m. 1901)
- Children: 3

Leopold Freiherr von Imhof (7 July 1869 – 30 April 1922) was an Austrian civil servant who served as the Governor of Liechtenstein from 1914 to 1918.

== Early life and career ==
Imhof was born on 7 July 1869 in Salzburg. He studied law in Vienna and Munich.

He worked in administrative services in the state governments of Salzburg, Upper Austria and Tyrol. He was also Ministerial Secretary in the Ministry of the Interior in Vienna, where he gained contact with Prince Eduard of Liechtenstein, which gave him connections within Liechtenstein.

== Governor of Liechtenstein ==
=== Appointment and World War I ===
Imhof was the Governor of Liechtenstein, serving from 1 April 1914 to 13 November 1918. He was appointed to the position by Prince Johann II only after he was unable to fulfil the mandate from the Landtag of Liechtenstein for the appointment of a Governor from Vorarlberg or Tyrol following the death of Carl von In der Maur on 11 December 1913. Nevertheless, he was welcomed in Liechtenstein.

Shortly after his appointment World War I began; Imhof initially responded to this with enthusiasm and was strongly supportive of the Central Powers. However, as the war dragged on, Liechtenstein faced increasing food shortages and inflation. From 1916 Liechtenstein was embargoed by the Entente countries, which caused mass unemployment in the country. Imhof soon faced criticism that the measures he had taken to address the economic crisis were inadequate, and he was accused of incompetence. As a result, he often entered fierce debates with Wilhelm Beck, who had formed an emerging opposition group against him. He also faced several accusations of smuggling and hoarding for himself during the war.

=== Cabinet ===
The cabinet of Leopold Freiherr von Imhof served as the government of Liechtenstein from April 1, 1914, until November 13, 1918. It was succeeded by the Provisional Executive Committee after a political upheaval in November 1918.

Portrait	Name	Took office	Left office	Party	Election
Leopold von Imhof	Leopold von Imhof (1869–1922)	26 March 1914	7 November 1918 (De facto); 13 November 1918 (De jure)	Independent	1914; 1918
Meinrad Ospelt	Meinrad Ospelt (1844–1934)	26 March 1914	7 November 1918 (De facto); 13 November 1918 (De jure)	Independent	1914; 1918
Lorenz Kind	Lorenz Kind	26 March 1914	7 November 1918 (De facto); 13 November 1918 (De jure)	Independent	1914; 1918

=== Removal from office ===
By November 1918, opposition members Wilhelm Beck, Martin Ritter and Fritz Walser, who were deeply dissatisfied with Imhof's handling of the economy and wanted a Liechtensteiner head of state, proposed a motion of no confidence against him. Imhof asked for a vote of confidence and at the same time agreed to submit his resignation. Although the Landtag of Liechtenstein unanimously expressed its confidence in him, it was decided, against the constitution, to transfer the power of Governor to a Provisional Executive Committee led by Martin Ritter, and Prince Johann accepted Imhof's resignation on 13 November.

The government rejected the state's contribution to Imhof's pension as he was entitled to one only after ten years of service in Liechtenstein. It was granted to him by Johann II from December 1919 using private funds at his personal request.

== Later life and death ==
Imhof retired to his home town of Salzburg, where he died on 30 April 1922, aged 52.

== Personal life ==
Imhof married Ida Hoffmann on 7 September 1901 and they had three children together.

== Honours ==
- Austria-Hungary: Imperial Order of Franz Joseph
- Belgium: Grand Cordon of Order of Leopold
- Liechtenstein: Commemorative Medal for the Golden Jubilee of HSH Prince Johan II.

== See also ==
- Politics of Liechtenstein
