= 1918 Liechtenstein putsch =

1918 coup d'état in Liechtenstein

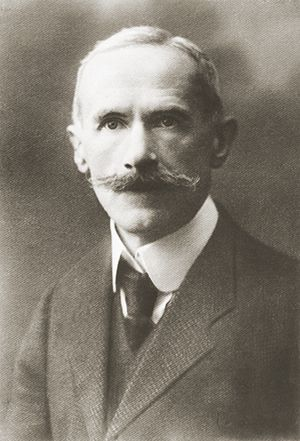
- Leopold Imhof, Governor of Liechtenstein since April 1914
Date	7 November 1918
Location	Vaduz, Liechtenstein
Result	Christian-Social People's Party victory: Government of Leopold Freiherr von Imhof forced to resign.; Provisional Executive Committee established in place until 7 December 1918.; three members of the Landtag resign in protest to the executive committee.

Belligerents
Christian-Social People's Party; Anti-Imhof Landtag members	Cabinet of Leopold Imhof; Pro-Imhof Landtag members

Commanders and leaders
Wilhelm Beck; Martin Ritter; Fritz Walser	Leopold Freiherr von Imhof; Albert Schädler

The 1918 Liechtenstein putsch (German: Novemberputsch 1918), also known as the Beck putsch, was a de facto coup d'état conducted by Wilhelm Beck, Fritz Walser, and Martin Ritter on 7 November against the government of Governor of Liechtenstein, Leopold Freiherr von Imhof. The coup forced Imhof's government to resign and established a Provisional Executive Committee in his place until 7 December.

== Background ==
Following the outbreak of World War I in August 1914, Liechtenstein remained neutral. The government and general population were supportive of the Central Powers, particularly Austria-Hungary, as the two countries had been in a customs union since 1852. The majority of the Liechtenstein government did not expect the war to last long, thus no food or economic preparations were made for it; due to this belief, no official declaration of neutrality was made. As a result, France, Russia, and the United Kingdom interned Liechtensteiners and partially confiscated their assets. In response, the Liechtenstein government made various declarations that the country was neutral and a separate entity from Austria-Hungary.

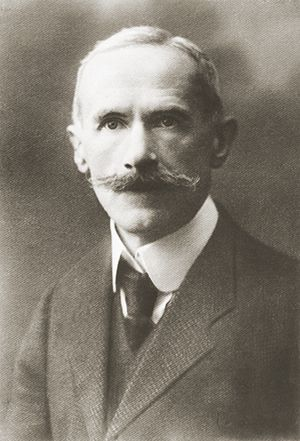
Leopold Freiherr von Imhof, Governor of Liechtenstein since April 1914

From autumn 1914, food deliveries from Austria-Hungary, which Liechtenstein relied on, began to decrease. In addition, Switzerland was pressured by the United Kingdom and France to end its food exports to Liechtenstein due to the latter's close ties to Austria-Hungary. In response to shortages, the Liechtenstein government, led by Leopold Freiherr von Imhof, issued emergency commissions throughout the country on 14 December 1914. These commissions aimed to manage the procurement of food and raw materials, now in short supply, and to distribute them to the population.

Despite this, food shortages increased as the war continued, and by 1916 all food deliveries from Austria-Hungary had ceased, which forced Liechtenstein to seek closer ties with Switzerland in order to ensure food deliveries continued. As a result, smuggling of food and raw materials increased significantly. From 1916, Liechtenstein was embargoed by the Entente countries.

As the war continued, the population grew increasingly dissatisfied with Imhof's leadership. This allowed for politicians such as Wilhelm Beck to gain prominence; Beck formed a social liberal-minded opposition group against Imhof in 1914, and also the newspaper Oberrheinische Nachrichten. Imhof soon faced accusations that the measures he took to address the economic crisis were inadequate and that of incompetent; fierce debates between Beck and Imhof took place in the Landtag of Liechtenstein. In February 1918, the group around Beck formalized to form the social-liberal Christian-Social People's Party (VP), and the conservative Progressive Citizens' Party (FBP) was officially founded in December the same year, the first political parties in Liechtenstein; in the 1918 Liechtenstein general election the FBP won seven of the twelve seats up for election, whereas the VP won five.

== Coup ==
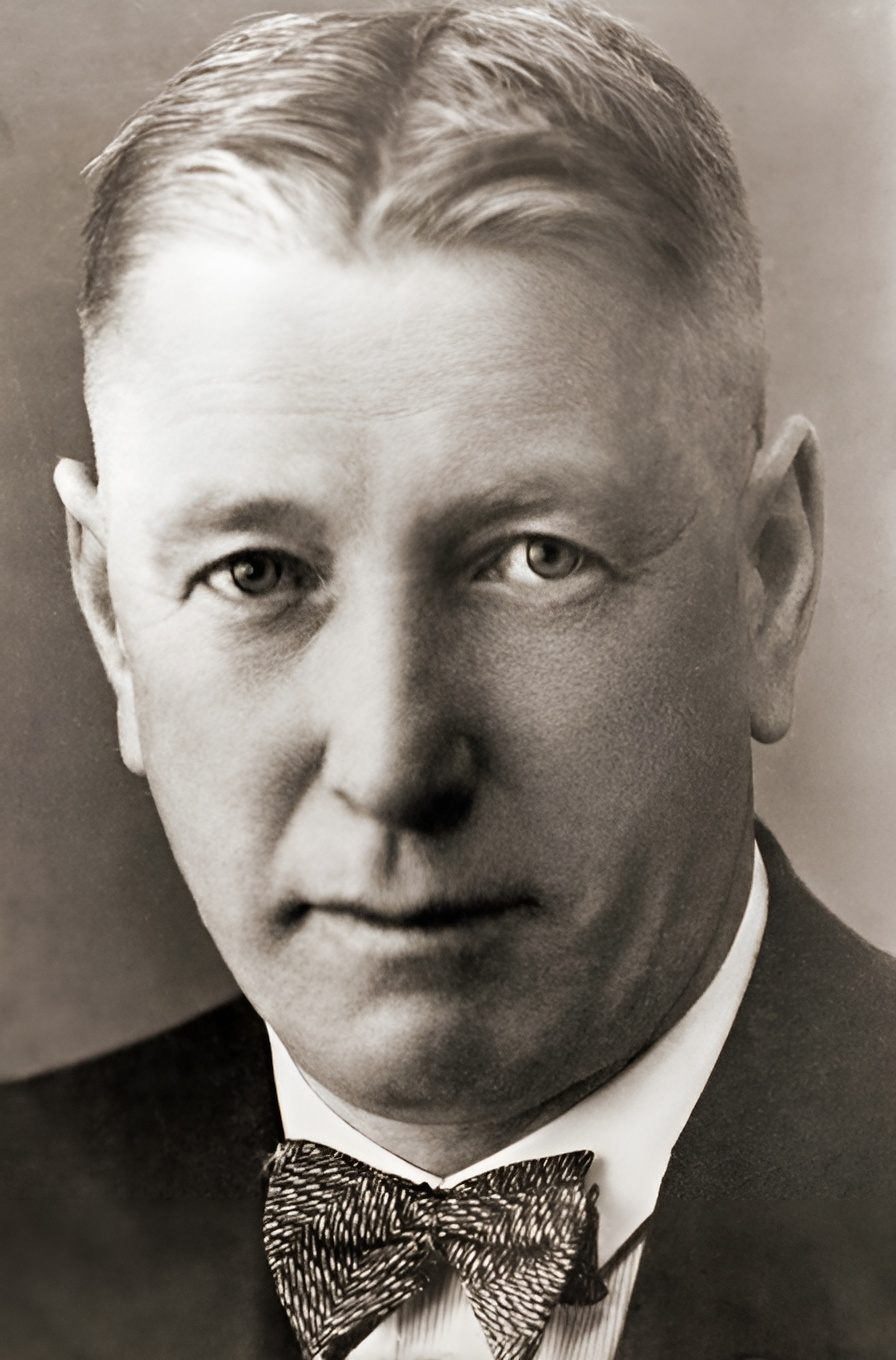
Wilhelm Beck

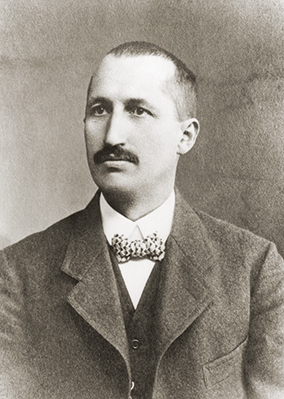
Fritz Walser

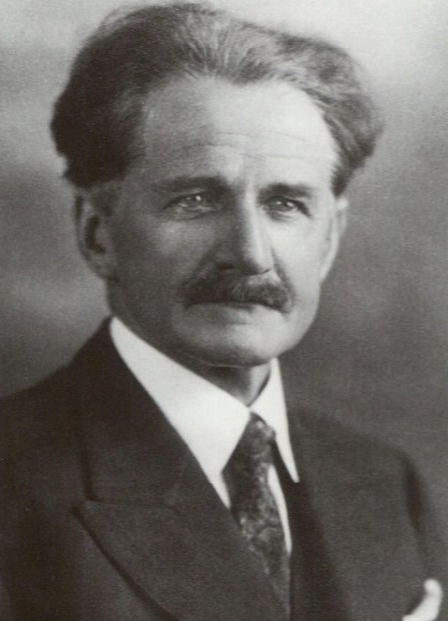
Martin Ritter

In November 1918 Beck, who wanted a Liechtensteiner head of government, joined with Martin Ritter and Fritz Walser to plot to overthrow Imhof. On 7 November 1918, they proposed a motion of no confidence in the Landtag against him; Imhof asked for a vote of confidence and at the same time agreed to submit his resignation due to pressure from members of the Landtag. While the Landtag unanimously expressed its confidence in him, it was decided by the elected members, against the constitution (Note: The 1862 constitution stipulated that the prince had the sole authority to appoint and dismiss officials, particularly the governor, with the Landtag having no direct say.) and the prince-appointed Landtag members, to transfer the power of Governor to a Provisional Executive Committee led by Ritter.

The three members of the Landtag appointed by the prince resigned in protest to the executive committee. Johann II, Prince of Liechtenstein accepted Imhof's resignation on 13 November and recognised the formation of the committee. President of the Landtag Albert Schädler met with Johann II for talks in Vienna, where it was agreed that the committee would only last one month and that Johann's nephew Prince Karl Aloys would be appointed Governor upon the committee's dissolution; this was a compromise due to the popular demand for a Liechtensteiner head of government.

== Aftermath and legacy ==
Within the general population of Liechtenstein the coup was popular, as Imhof was largely seen as the reason for the country's economic crisis. However, in the Landtag it was far more controversial. Ritter in particular was a controversial figure due to the unconstitutional means by which he came into power, despite only serving for one month, from 7 November to 7 December 1918.

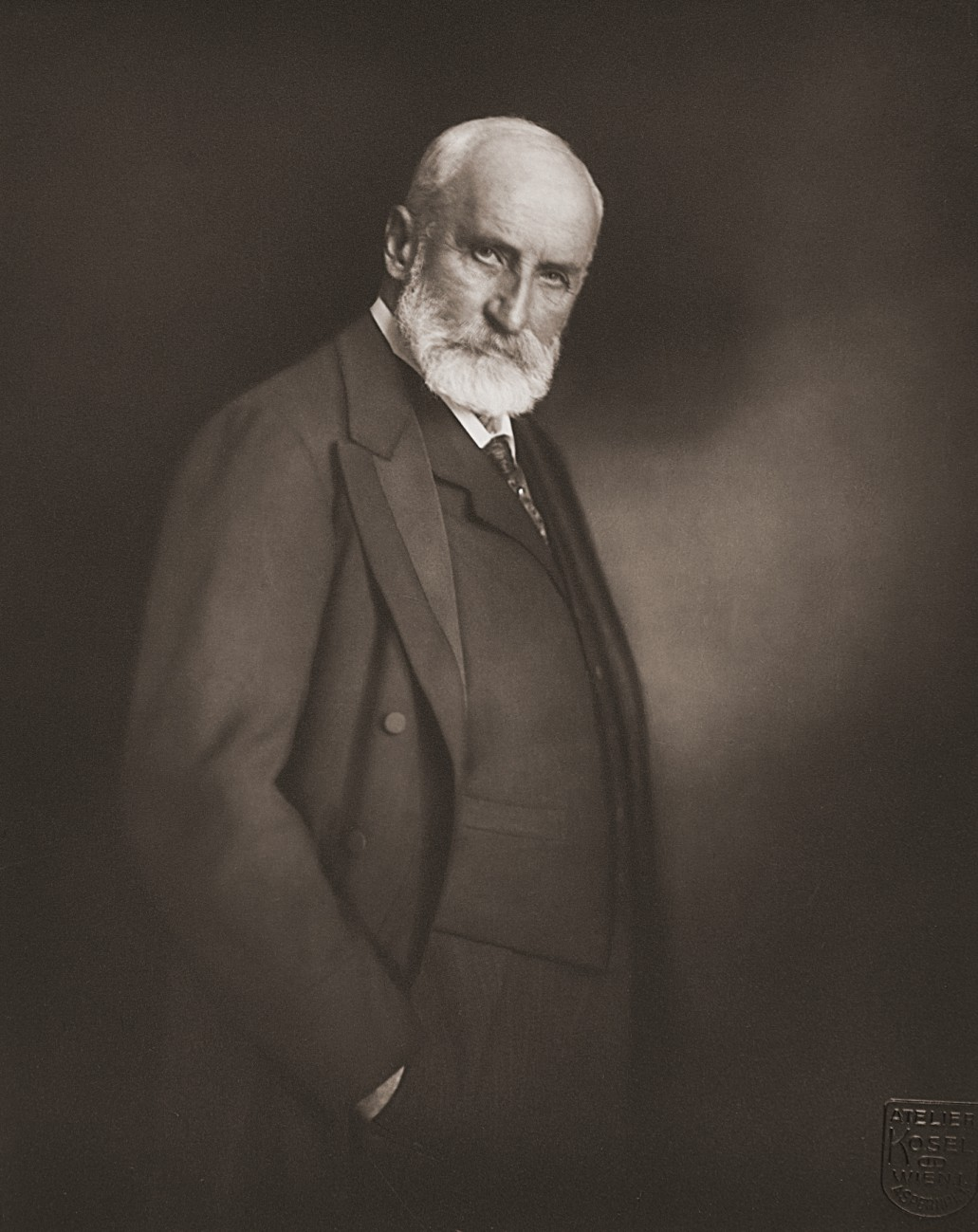
Johann II

Johann II reportedly responded with reservation to the coup. He remained in Vienna throughout the committee's duration but did not make any efforts to act against it, primarily due to its popularity within the country. The committee did not intend to break with the monarchy; its proclamation ended with the phrase "May the prince and the country live long." An expression of his involvement in state affairs was a telegram sent by his office to Albert Schädler:

His Serene Highness reacted with reservation to the fact that a committee had taken over power in the country. Official decisions on the committee will follow.

— Prince's office on behalf of Johann II, Prince of Liechtenstein,

The coup directly undermined the 1862 Constitution of Liechtenstein. With the economic devastation of World War I, it built a large base of support for constitutional revision in the country. Soon afterwards, a constitutional committee was elected, which would begin a three-year period where both the Progressive Citizens' Party and Christian-Social People's Party, with assistance from Josef Peer, worked together to create a new constitution, as a continuation of Beck's ideals.

The constitution was signed into law by Prince Karl Aloys on behalf of Johann II, with Josef Ospelt representing the government, on 5 October 1921. It established the rule of partial parliamentary democracy mixed with that of constitutional monarchy, as well as providing for referendums on decisions of the Landtag. It also abolished the three seats in the Landtag appointed by the Prince and lowered the voting age from 24 to 21 with universal male suffrage.

== Bibliography ==
- Nohlen, Dieter; Stöver, Philip (2010). Elections in Europe: A data handbook. Nomos. ISBN 978-3-8329-5609-7.

== See also ==
- History of Liechtenstein
- Constitution of Liechtenstein
