= Fritz Walser =

President of the Landtag of Liechtenstein from 1919 to 1921

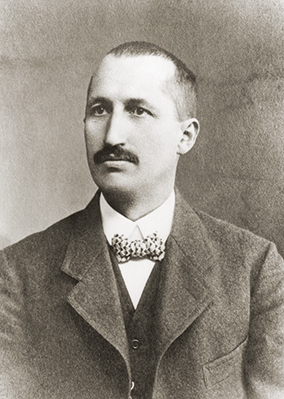

President of the Landtag of Liechtenstein
- In office December 1919 – December 1921
- Monarch: Johann II
- Preceded by: Albert Schädler
- Succeeded by: Wilhelm Beck

Member of the Landtag of Liechtenstein for Oberland
- In office 16 March 1930 – 13 March 1932
- In office 11 March 1918 – 16 February 1922
- In office 30 July 1906 – 2 October 1914

Personal details
- Born: 16 November 1870 Schaan, Liechtenstein
- Died: 26 March 1950 (aged 69) Schaan, Liechtenstein
- Party: Progressive Citizens' Party
- Spouse: Julia Wachter-Wölfle (m. 1899; died 1949)
- Children: 5

Fritz Walser (16 November 1870 – 26 March 1950) was a politician from Liechtenstein who served as President of the Landtag of Liechtenstein from 1919 to 1921. He also served in the Landtag of Liechtenstein from 1906 to 1914, 1918 to 1922, and again from 1930 to 1932. Additionally, he was also the mayor of Schaan from 1909 to 1912 and again from 1915 to 1918.

== Early life ==
Walser was born on 16 November 1870 in Schaan as the son of sergeant and community leader Ferdinand Walser and Josefa Schlegel as one of seven children.

== Career ==
From 1887 to 1933 he was an agent for Bâloise against fire damage in Liechtenstein. From 1896 he was also a clerk at the regional court. In 1904 Walser took over the Schaan post office from his father-in-law as post administrator, and from 1906 to 1935 he became postmaster. From 1906 to 1909 he was a member of the Schaan school council, and its deputy head from 1912 to 1915. From 1907 to 1920 he was a member of the state school board. He was the mayor of Schaan from 1909 to 1912 and again from 1915 to 1918.

From 1906 to 1914, 1918 to 1922 and again from 1930 to 1932 he served in the Landtag of Liechtenstein as a member of the Progressive Citizens' Party. In 1907, Walser, together with Karl Schädler and Jakob Kaiser, submitted a proposal to create a press law. He was committed to the issue of Liechtenstein stamps, which was made possible by the 1911 postal agreement with Austria-Hungary.

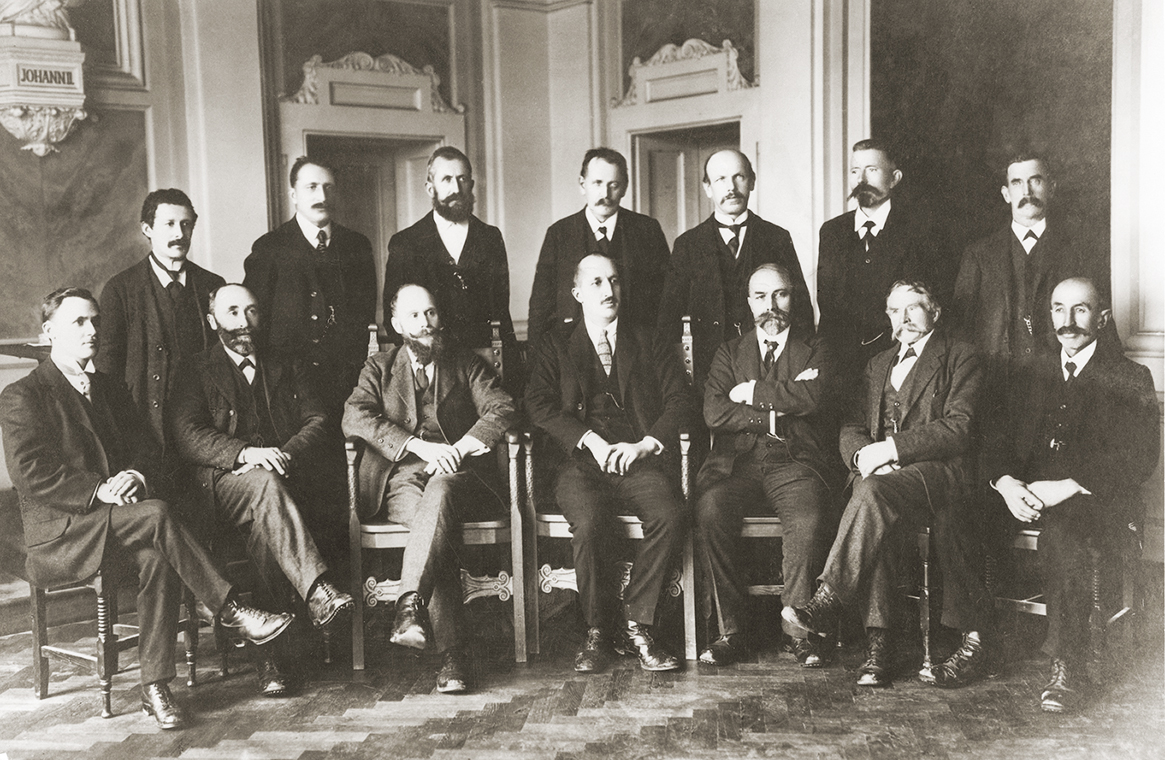
Walser (fourth from left on front) with members of the Landtag, 1921.

Throughout World War I, Walser was an outspoken critic of Leopold Freiherr von Imhof, the Governor of Liechtenstein, as the war had brought economic devastation to the country. He played a key role in the November 1918 Liechtenstein putsch; he along with Wilhelm Beck and Martin Ritter, deeply dissatisfied by Imhof's handling of the economy and who wanted a Liechtensteiner head of state, proposed a motion of no confidence against him in the Landtag on 7 November. Imhof asked for a vote of confidence and at the same time agreed to submit his resignation. While the Landtag unanimously expressed its confidence in him it was decided, against the constitution and the princely appointed Landtag members, to transfer the power of Governor to a Provisional Executive Committee led by Ritter and Johann II accepted Imhof's resignation on 13 November. He was subsequently appointed President of the Landtag of Liechtenstein in January 1919, serving until December 1921.

Walser was a leading member of the foundation of the Progressive Citizens' Party in 1918. Despite previously wanting a Liechtensteiner head of state, when Johann II appointed Josef Peer Governor of Liechtenstein in 1920, Walser and the Progressive Citizens' Party supported his appointment in contrast to the Christian-Social People's Party as they believed the role should only be reserved for Liechtensteiners. Eventually it was agreed that Peer could take the position, but only for a 6-month period. He was a member of the committee for Liechtenstein's constitutional revision, creating the constitution of Liechtenstein, which was ratified on 5 October 1921.

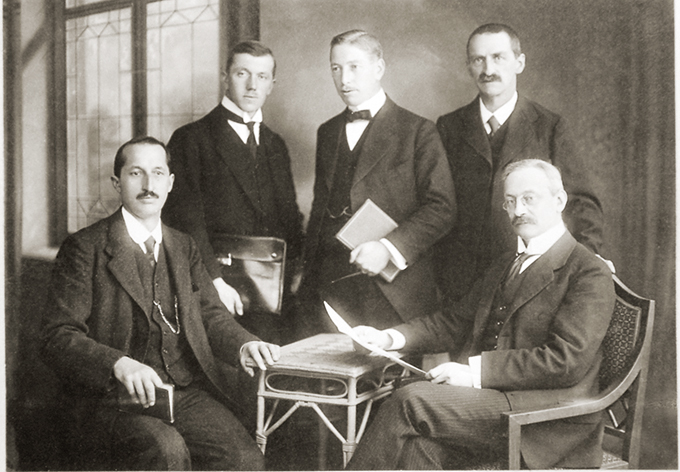
Walser (bottom-left) as part of the Liechtenstein delegation for custom union negotiations with Switzerland, 1920.

He was a member of the Liechtenstein delegation for in negotiations between Liechtenstein and Switzerland for forming closer economic ties, which cultivated in a customs union being formed between the two countries in 1924. In 1938 he was a member of negotiations between the Progressive Citizens' Party and Patriotic Union when they formed a coalition government overseen by Franz Joseph II in the wake of the Anschluss of Austria.

From 1939 he was a princley poastal councillor and from 1940 an honorary member of the Historical Association for the Principality of Liechtenstein.

== Personal life ==
Walser married Julia Wachter-Wölfle (12 October 1880 – 19 August 1949) on 18 September 1899 and they had five children together.

Walser died on 26 March 1950 in Schaan, aged 69 years old.

== See also ==
- Politics of Liechtenstein
