= 1910 Liechtenstein general election =

- 2 and 4 August 1910
- 12 seats in the Landtag
Landesverweser before	Landesverweser after
Carl von In der Maur; Independent	Carl von In der Maur; Independent

General elections were held in Liechtenstein on 2 and 4 August 1910.

== Electors ==
Electors were selected through elections that were held between 23 and 28 July. Each municipality had two electors for every 100 inhabitants.

Municipality	Electors	+/–
Balzers	26	0
Eschen	20	–2
Gamprin	8	0
Mauren	22	0
Planken	2	0
Ruggell	12	0
Schaan	22	0
Schellenberg	8	–2
Triesen	24	+2
Triesenberg	24	0
Vaduz	24	+2
Total	192	0
Source: Vogt

== Results ==
The election of Oberland's Landtag members and substitutes was held on 2 August in Vaduz. Of Oberland's 122 electors, 117 were present. Oberland elected seven Landtag members and three substitutes.

The election of Unterland's Landtag members and substitutes was held on 4 August in Mauren. Of Unterland's 70 electors, 69 were present. Unterland elected five Landtag members and two substitute.

Electoral district	Seats	Electors	Turnout	Ballots	Elected members	Elected substitutes
Oberland	7	122	117	1st	Xaver Bargetze; Franz Josef Beck; Alfons Brunhart; Albert Schädler; Franz Schlegel; Fritz Walser; Emil Wolfinger	–
Oberland	7	122	117	2nd	–	Josef Gassner
Oberland	7	122	117	3rd	–	Luzius Gassner; Albert Wolfinger
Unterland	5	70	69	1st	Emil Batliner; Franz Josef Hoop; Jakob Kaiser; Lorenz Kind; Franz Josef Marxer	Gebhard Schädler; Johann Wohlwend
Unterland	5	70	69	2nd	–	–
Unterland	5	70	69	3rd	–	–
Source: Vogt

Franz Schlegel did not accept his election as a Landtag member for Oberland and was replaced by Josef Gassner.
