= Ritter & Beck Rechtsanwälte =

Liechtenstein law firm established in 1914

Coordinates: 47°08′21″N 9°31′20″E

- Headquarters: Städtle 36, 9490 Vaduz, Liechtenstein
- No. of attorneys: 3
- Date founded: 1914; 112 years ago
- Founder: Wilhelm Beck
- Website: www.rbp.li/screen/ritter_kanzlei

Ritter & Beck Rechtsanwälte is a law firm based in Vaduz, Liechtenstein.

== History ==
The firm was founded in 1914 by politician Wilhelm Beck. In 1926, fellow lawyer Alois Ritter joined his office and the two worked together, in which the firm derives its name.

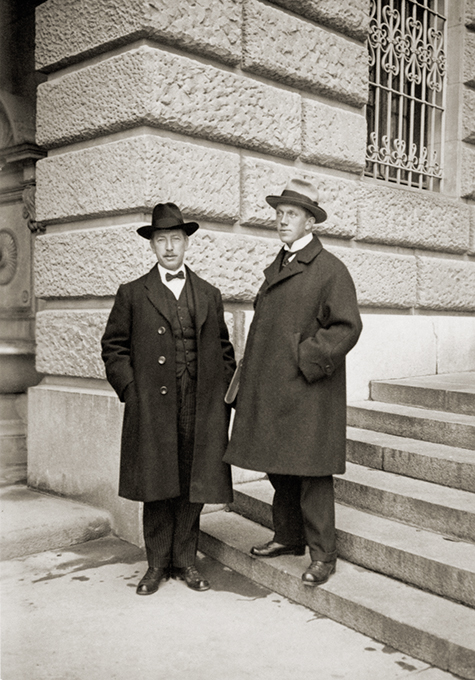
Wilhelm Beck and Emil Beck in front of the Federal Palace of Switzerland, 1920.

Beck was a pioneer of Liechtenstein financial services and fiduciary services. Together with Emil Beck (no relation), they wrote the Liechtenstein Personal and Company law, which came into force in 1926. By 1930, almost half of Liechtenstein's domiciliary companies were founded by Ritter & Beck.

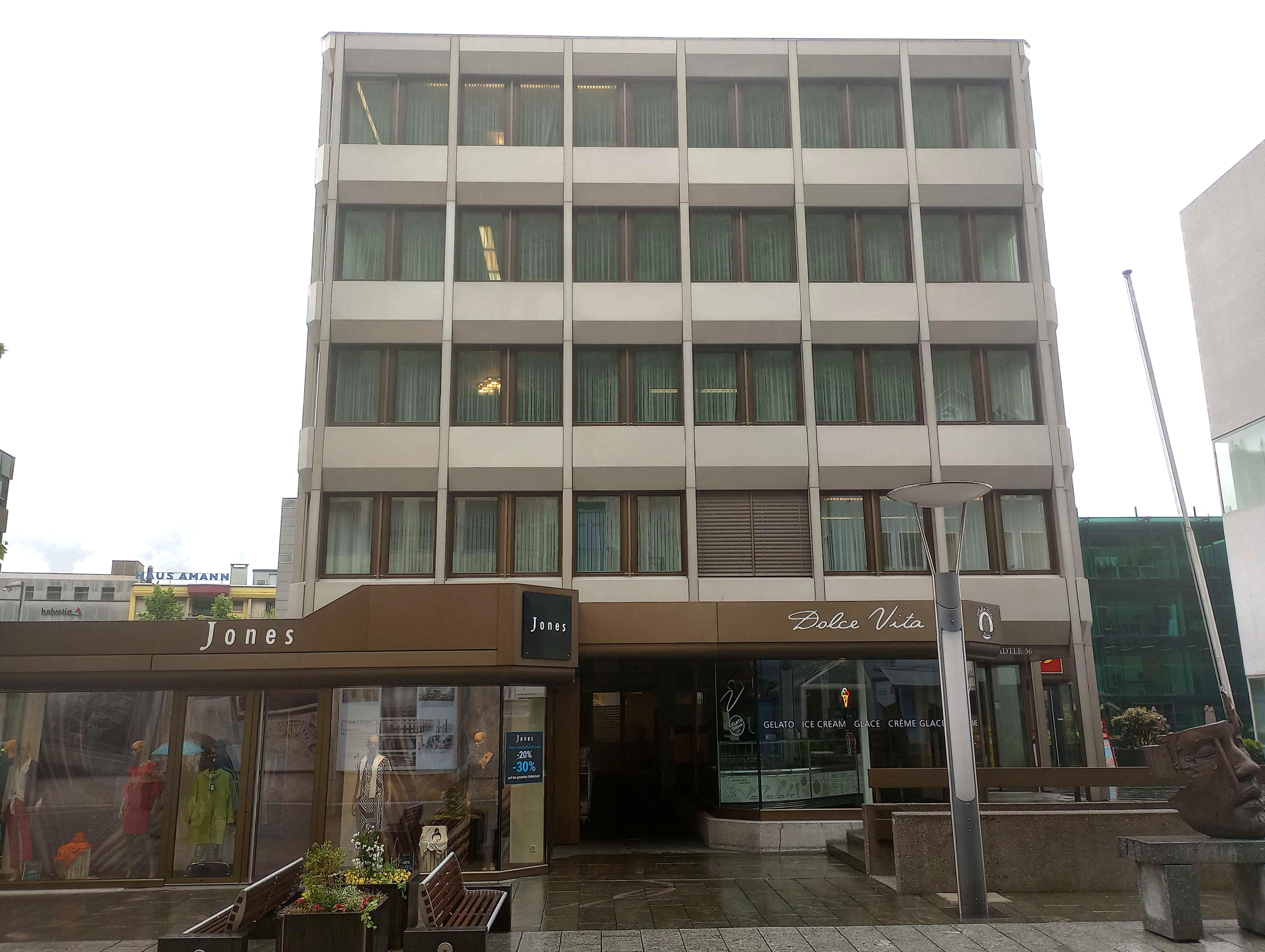
Ritter & Beck Rechtsanwälte headquarters in Vaduz

After Wilhelm Beck's death on 20 January 1936 Alois Ritter took over the firm. In 1958 his son Karlheinz Ritter joined the firm, and took it over from his father upon his death on 31 January 1966. Since his death in 2008 Cornelia Ritter, Alexander Fitz and Marzell Beck took over the firm, and are the current heads.

== Operations ==
Ritter & Beck Rechtsanwälte specialises in corporate law, estate law, tax law and inheritance law along with international law regulation.
