= Felix Gubelmann =

Liechtensteiner politician (1880–1929)

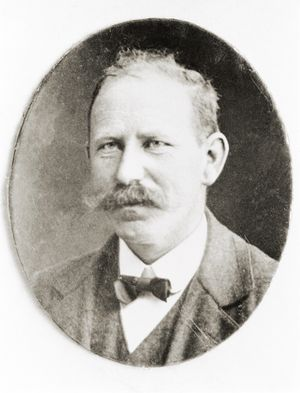

Acting Prime Minister of Liechtenstein
- In office 1 June 1922 – 6 June 1922
- Monarch: Johann II
- Deputy: None
- Preceded by: Alfons Feger (acting)
- Succeeded by: Gustav Schädler (as prime minister)

Member of the Landtag of Liechtenstein for Unterland
- In office 5 February 1922 – 10 January 1926

Personal details
- Born: 24 December 1880 Gamprin, Liechtenstein
- Died: 13 July 1929 (aged 48) Gamprin, Liechtenstein
- Party: Christian-Social People's Party
- Spouse: Barbara Heeb (m. 1906)
- Children: 2

Felix Gubelmann (German pronunciation: [ˈfeːlɪks ˈɡuːbl̩ˌman]; 24 December 1880 – 13 July 1929) was a politician from Liechtenstein who served in the Landtag of Liechtenstein from 1922 to 1926 and briefly as acting Prime Minister of Liechtenstein In June 1922.

== Life ==
Gubelmann was born in Gamprin, Liechtenstein where he spent his early years living and working on his family's farm in the area.

In 1909, Gubelmann was appointed as the municipal treasurer of Gamprin which he held until 1916. In 1916 he was appointed as deputy mediator in the municipality, then promoted to primary mediator in 1922 until 1929. In 1922 Gubelmann was elected into the Landtag of Liechtenstein initially as a member of the Progressive Citizens' Party, but later switched to the Christian-Social People's Party. He also served as a councillor during his time at the Landtag.

In June 1922, after the resignation of Prime Minister of Liechtenstein Josef Ospelt and subsequent resignation of acting prime minister Alfons Feger Gubelmann as the oldest member of government at the time was appointed acting prime minister. He held this position until Gustav Schädler took over the role on 6 June 1922. He was a government councillor in the Schädler cabinet before he resigned from all government positions in January 1926.

Between 1900 and 1928 he was a member of the volunteer fire department in Gamprin.

== Personal life ==
Gubelmann married Barbara Heeb (20 April 1881 – 1961) on February 12 1906 and they had two children together, along with a foster child. He died on 13 July 1929 in Gamprin at the age of 48.
