= Provisional Executive Committee (Liechtenstein) =

Governing body of Liechtenstein in 1918

- Government of Liechtenstein

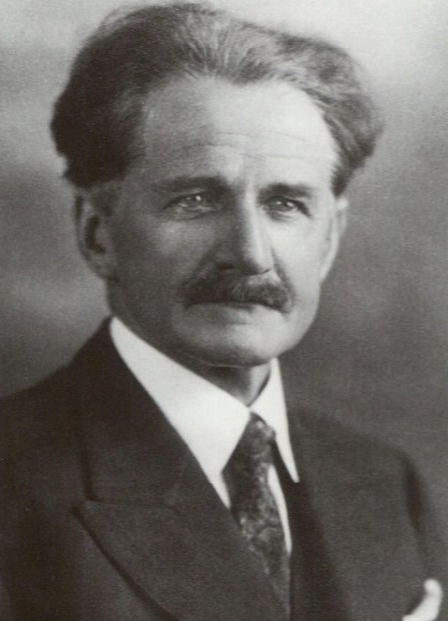
- Date formed: 7 November 1918 (de facto); 13 November 1918 (de jure)
- Date dissolved: 7 December 1918

People and organisations
- Head of state: Johann II
- Head of government: Martin Ritter
- Total no. of members: 3
- Member parties: VP; FBP

History
- Predecessor: Leopold Freiherr von Imhof cabinet
- Successor: Prince Karl Aloys cabinet

The Provisional Executive Committee (German: Provisorischer Vollzugsausschuss) was the governing body of Liechtenstein from 7 November to 7 December 1918. Established following the November 1918 Liechtenstein putsch, it was chaired by Martin Ritter.

== History and legacy ==
In November 1918 Landtag members Wilhelm Beck, Martin Ritter and Fritz Walser, who were deeply dissatisfied with Governor of Liechtenstein Leopold Freiherr von Imhof's handling of the economy and who wanted a Liechtensteiner head of state, plotted to overthrow him. In the Landtag on 7 November 1918 they proposed a motion of no confidence against him. Imhof asked for a vote of confidence and at the same time agreed to submit his resignation. While the Landtag unanimously expressed its confidence in him it was decided, against the constitution and the princely appointed Landtag members, to transfer the power of governor to a provisional executive committee led by Martin Ritter.

The committee was accepted "in grace" by Johann II on 13 November and he accepted Imhof's resignation. He remained in Vienna throughout the committee's duration but did not make any efforts to act against it, primarily due to its popularity within the country. The committee did not intend to break with the monarchy, its proclamation itself ended with the phrase "May the prince and the country live long." It was agreed to last one month when a replacement cabinet could be found. On 7 December 1918 it was dissolved and succeeded by the Prince Karl Aloys cabinet.

Within the general population of Liechtenstein the coup was popular, as Imhof was largely seen as the reason for the country's economic crisis. However, in the Landtag it was far more controversial. Martin Ritter in particular was a controversial figure in the government, due to him being the first Liechtensteiner head of state and the unconstitutional means in which he came into power, despite only serving for one month. In response to the coup, all three members of the Landtag appointed by Johann II resigned in protest.

== Members ==
Picture	Name	Term	Party
Chairman
	Martin Ritter	7 November 1918 – 7 December 1918	Christian-Social People's Party
Members
	Wilhelm Beck	7 November 1918 – 7 December 1918	Christian-Social People's Party
	Franz Josef Marxer	12 November 1918 – 7 December 1918	Progressive Citizens' Party

== Bibliography ==
- Vogt, Paul (1987). 125 Jahre Landtag (in German). Vaduz: Landtag of the Principality of Liechtenstein.
