= Martin Ritter =

Chairman of the Liechtenstein Provisional Executive Committee in 1918

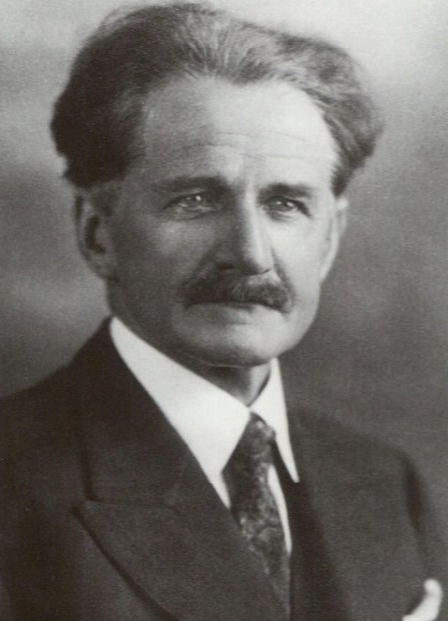

Chairman of the Provisional Executive Committee
- In office 7 November 1918 – 7 December 1918
- Monarch: Johann II
- Preceded by: Leopold Freiherr von Imhof (As Governor)
- Succeeded by: Prince Karl Aloys of Liechtenstein (As Governor)

Personal details
- Born: 3 March 1872 Mauren, Liechtenstein
- Died: 5 September 1947 (aged 75) Innsbruck, Allied-occupied Austria
- Party: Christian-Social People's Party
- Spouse: Augusta Fischer (m. 1900)
- Children: 3
- Cabinet: Provisional Executive Committee

Martin Ritter (German pronunciation: [ˈmaʁtɪn ˈʁɪtɐ]; 3 March 1872 – 5 September 1947) was an advocate and political figure from Liechtenstein who served as the Chairman of the Provisional Executive Committee in 1918.

== Early life ==
Ritter was born on 3 March 1872 in Mauren to the son of teacher Franz Josef Ritter and his mother Aloisia Lingg as one of six children. He attended high school in Feldkirch and Hall in Tirol. He studied law in the University of Innsbruck, Vienna and the University of Graz, where he passed the bar exam in 1902.

== Career ==
In 1898, Ritter unsuccessfully applied for a district judge position in Vaduz. In 1903 and again in 1917 he applied for princely position in the Liechtenstein government, but these were denied by Governor of Liechtenstein Carl von In der Maur and Leopold Freiherr von Imhof respectively. In 1905 moved to Innsbruck where he opened his own law firm and renounced Liechtensteiner citizenship. It was only after a protracted effort and against the will of Governor Imhof that he managed to regain his citizenship in Mauren through a community vote on 21 October 1917.

During World War I, Ritter was in opposition to Imhof's government. As the war continued, the population grew increasingly dissatisfied with Imhof's leadership. This allowed for politicians such as Wilhelm Beck to gain prominence and growing support in Liechtenstein when he formed an opposition group around himself against Imhof in 1914, of which Ritter became a leading member. He was a founding member of the Christian-Social People's Party in February 1918.

In the November 1918 Liechtenstein putsch Ritter, along with Landtag members Wilhelm Beck and Fritz Walser, who were deeply dissatisfied with Imhof's handling of the economy and who wanted a Liechtensteiner head of state, plotted to overthrow him. In the Landtag of Liechtenstein on 7 November 1918 they proposed a motion of no confidence against him. Imhof asked for a vote of confidence and at the same time agreed to submit his resignation. While the Landtag unanimously expressed its confidence in him it was decided, against the constitution and the princely appointed Landtag members, to transfer the power of governor to a Provisional Executive Committee led by Ritter.

Within the general population of Liechtenstein the coup was popular, as Imhof was largely seen as the reason for the country's economic crisis. However, in the Landtag it was far more controversial. Ritter in particular was a controversial figure as the first Liechtensteiner head of government, due to the unconstitutional means in which he came into power, despite only serving for one month, from 7 November to 7 December 1918.

== Later life and death ==
Following the Provisional Executive Committee's end in December 1918 Ritter withdrew from politics and once again moved to Innsbruck where he lived a private life. He died in the city on 5 September 1947, aged 75 years old.

== Personal life ==
Ritter married Augusta Fischer (19 August 1878 – Unknown) in 1900 and they had three children together.
