= 1922 Liechtenstein tax law referendum =

24 December 1922
- Referendum on a tax law

Results
Choice	Votes	%
Yes	1,078	59.59%
No	731	40.41%
Valid votes	1,809	96.53%
Invalid or blank votes	65	3.47%
Total votes	1,874	100.00%
Registered voters/turnout	2,075	90.31%

A referendum on a tax law was held in Liechtenstein on 24 December 1922. It was approved by 60% of voters.

== Results ==
Choice	Votes	%
For	1,078	59.59
Against	731	40.41
Total	1,809	100.00
Valid votes	1,809	96.53
Invalid/blank votes	65	3.47
Total votes	1,874	100.00
Registered voters/turnout	2,075	90.31
Source: Nohlen & Stöver
