= Albert Wolfinger =

Liechtenstein politician (1850–1931)

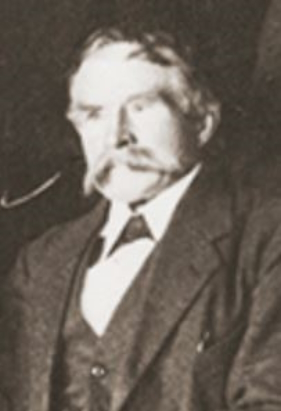
- Wolfinger in 1921

Member of the Landtag of Liechtenstein for Oberland
- In office 13 October 1913 – 24 January 1926
- Preceded by: Xaver Bargetze

Personal details
- Born: 18 February 1850 Balzers, Liechtenstein
- Died: 25 January 1931 (aged 80) Balzers, Liechtenstein
- Party: Christian-Social People's Party
- Spouse(s): Theresia Nigg (m. 1878; died 1898) Elisabeth Wolfinger (m. 1901)
- Children: 12

Albert Wolfinger (18 February 1850 – 25 January 1931) was a farmer and politician from Liechtenstein who served in the Landtag of Liechtenstein from 1913 to 1926.

== Life ==
Wolfinger emigrated to and lived in the United States from 1881 to 1883. He worked as a farmer and winemaker. From 1885 to 1894 he was a member of the Balzers municipal council, and also deputy mayor of the municipality from 1891 to 1894. From 1897 to 1900 and again from 1903 to 1912 he was the municipal treasurer of Balzers.

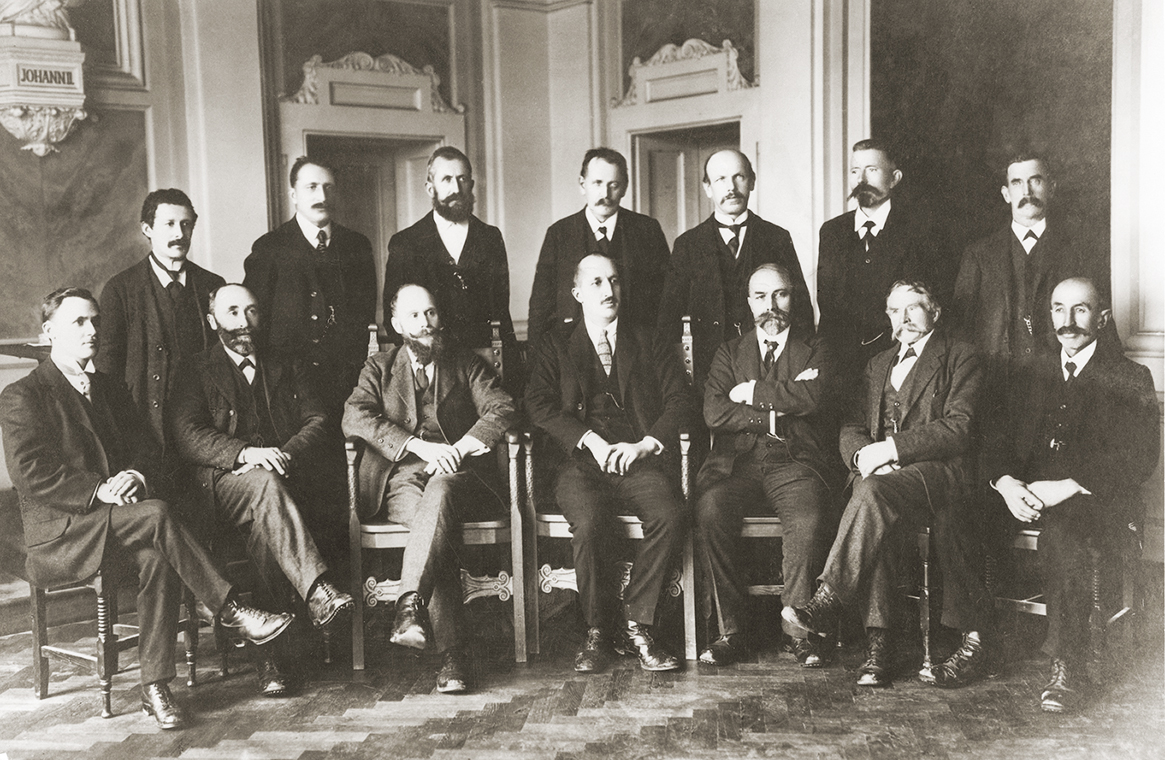
Wolfinger (second-right on front) with members of the Landtag, 1921.

In 1910 he was elected as a deputy member of the Landtag of Liechtenstein. He succeeded Xaver Bargetze as a full member of the Landtag upon his death on 29 October 1913 and held this position until January 1926. He was a member of the opposition group formed around Wilhelm Beck and was a founding member of the Christian-Social People's Party in February 1918.

Wolfinger married Theresia Nigg (29 March 1854 – 25 September 1898) on 4 March 1878 and they had seven children together. He then went on to marry Elisabeth Wolfinger (4 March 1870 – 15 August 1948) on 3 June 1901 and they had another five children together.

He died on 25 January 1931, aged 80.

== Bibliography ==
- Vogt, Paul (1987). 125 Jahre Landtag (in German). Vaduz: Landtag of the Principality of Liechtenstein.
