= Alfons Feger =

Deputy Prime Minister of Liechtenstein from 1922 to 1928

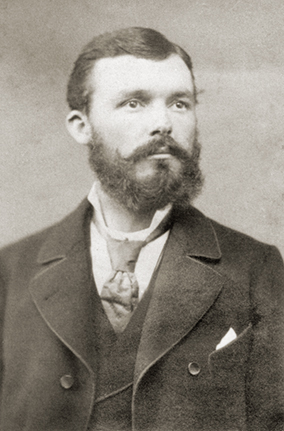

Acting Prime Minister of Liechtenstein
- In office 4 May 1922 – 1 June 1922
- Monarch: Johann II
- Deputy: None
- Preceded by: Josef Ospelt (As Prime Minister)
- Succeeded by: Felix Gubelmann (Acting)

Deputy Prime Minister of Liechtenstein
- In office 6 June 1922 – 26 June 1928
- Monarch: Johann II
- Prime Minister: Josef Ospelt; Himself; Felix Gubelmann; Gustav Schädler
- Preceded by: Position established
- Succeeded by: Ludwig Marxer

Personal details
- Born: 6 April 1856 Triesen, Liechtenstein
- Died: 18 July 1933 (aged 77) Vaduz, Liechtenstein
- Party: Christian-Social People's Party
- Spouse: Regina Wolfinger (m. 1899; died 1931)

Alfons Feger (6 April 1856 – 18 July 1933) was a teacher and politician from Liechtenstein who briefly served as acting Prime Minister of Liechtenstein from May to June 1922. He also served as Deputy Prime Minister from March to June 1922 and again from June 1922 to 1928.

== Early life and teaching career ==
Feger was born in Triesen, Liechtenstein on 6 April 1856 to one of 7 children. He attended state school in Vaduz then proceeded to attend college in Württemberg from 1873 to 1876. From there he worked as an elementary school teacher in Eschen and later Balzers until 1895 when he taught at a boy's secondary school in Vaduz. He served as a member of the state school council from 1897 to 1901 and the administrator of the state teachers' library from 1907 to 1919. He retired from teaching and resigned all positions in 1918.

== Political career ==
Feger was appointed to serve in the Landtag of Liechtenstein by Johann II in 1902, a position he held until 1918. He visited South Tyrol in 1915 soon after Italy's entry into World War I where he gathered a report of the situation on the battlefield on behalf of the Liechtenstein government.

He served as Deputy Prime Minister of Liechtenstein from 2 March 1922 to 1 June 1922 under Prime Minister Josef Ospelt until he resigned in mid-1922 and was briefly appointed as acting Prime Minister of Liechtenstein from 4 May 1922 to 1 June 1922, but he shortly afterwards resigned this position for reportedly health reasons. After which, he again served as deputy prime minister under the government of Gustav Schädler. Schädler's government, including Feger was forced to resign in 1928 as a result of an embezzlement scandal involving the National Bank of Liechtenstein.

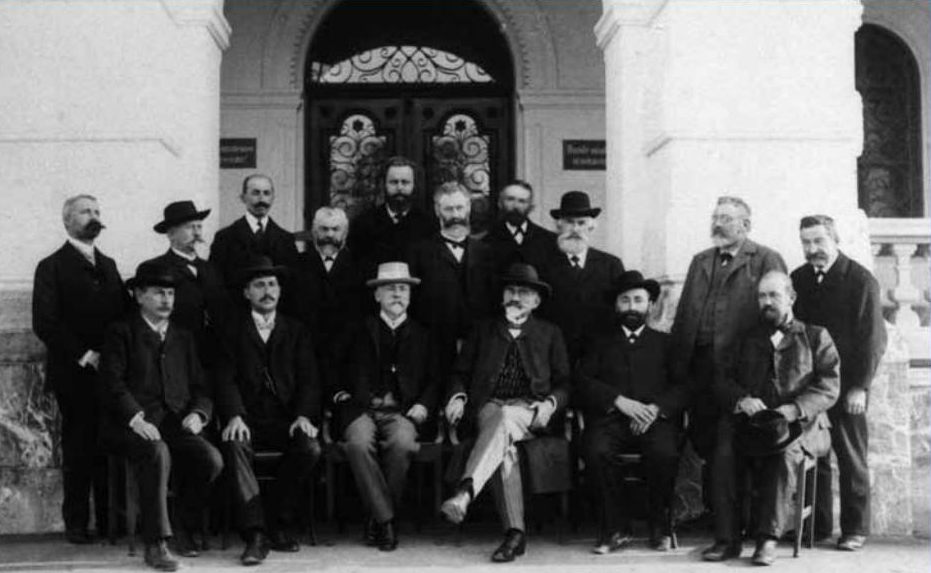
Feger (back first from left) in front of the Vaduz government building, 1908.

== Personal life ==
He married Regina Wolfinger (26 January 1860 – 16 April 1931) in 1899 and they had eight children.

Feger died on 18 July 1933 in Vaduz, at the age of 77.
