= 2000 Liechtenstein referendums =

Amending the law promoting cheap living
For	33.87%
Against	66.13%

Law on gaining and losing citizenship
For	50.10%
Against	49.90%

Agreement with Switzerland on performance related tax on heavy load traffic
For	70.98%
Against	29.02%

Three referendums were held in Liechtenstein during 2000. The first was held on 27 February on amending the law promoting cheap living, and was rejected by 66.3% of voters. The second was held on 18 June on the law on access to citizenship of the country, and was approved by 50.1% of voters, a margin of just 15 votes. The third on 24 September concerned an agreement with the neighbouring Switzerland on performance-related tax on heavy load traffic, and was approved by 71% of voters.

== Results ==
=== Amendment to the law on cheap living ===
Choice	Votes	%
For	3,037	33.87
Against	5,930	66.13
Total	8,967	100.00
Valid votes	8,967	98.15
Invalid/blank votes	169	1.85
Total votes	9,136	100.00
Registered voters/turnout	16,048	56.93
Source: Nohlen & Stöver

=== Citizenship ===
Choice	Votes	%
For	3,858	50.10
Against	3,843	49.90
Total	7,701	100.00
Valid votes	7,701	98.29
Invalid/blank votes	134	1.71
Total votes	7,835	100.00
Registered voters/turnout	16,108	48.64
Source: Nohlen & Stöver

=== Heavy load traffic ===
Choice	Votes	%
For	6,417	70.98
Against	2,623	29.02
Total	9,040	100.00
Valid votes	9,040	98.54
Invalid/blank votes	134	1.46
Total votes	9,174	100.00
Registered voters/turnout	16,173	56.72
Source: Nohlen & Stöver
