= Emil Beck (lawyer) =

Swiss lawyer and diplomat (1888–1973)

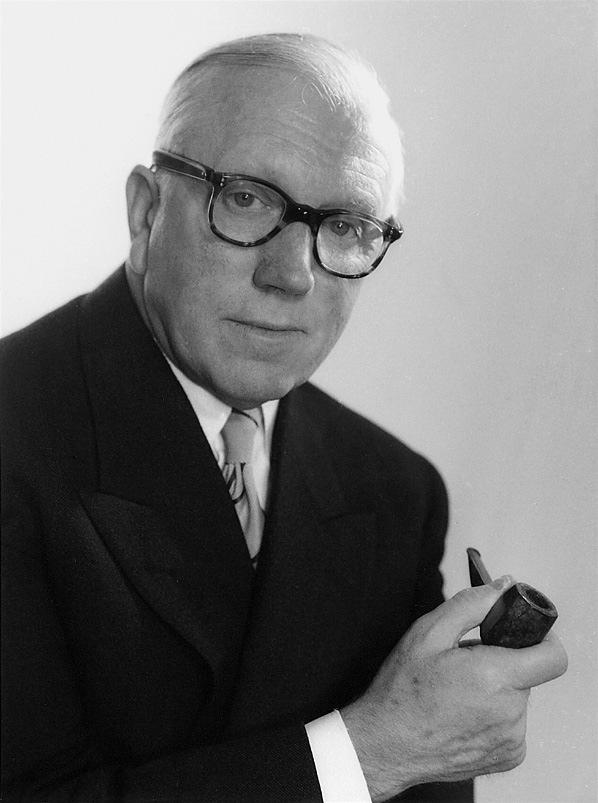
- Beck in 1950

Personal details
- Born: 25 November 1888 Flims, Switzerland
- Died: 31 January 1973 (aged 84) Bern, Switzerland
- Spouse: Nelly Ackermann (m. 1935)
- Children: 2

Emil Beck (25 November 1888 – 31 January 1973) was a Swiss lawyer, diplomat and professor. He was chargé d'affaires in the Liechtenstein embassy in Bern from 1919 to 1933.

== Early life ==
Beck was born on 25 November 1888 in Flims as the son of wood merchant Johann Beck and his mother Dorathe Held as one of nine children. He grew up in Tamins and attended school in Chur.

He studied law in Zurich, Paris and Bern where he received a diploma in 1916. From 1918 he was a private lecturer at the University of Bern. He worked as an assistant to Eugen Huber in Bern.

== Career ==
From 1919 to 1933 Beck was the chargé d'affaires in the Liechtenstein embassy in Bern. He took place in the negotiations of various state treaties between Liechtenstein and Switzerland. Together with Giuseppe Motta he signed a poastal agreement in 1920 and on 29 March 1923 the agreement that finalized the establishment of a customs union between the two countries, which came into effect in 1924.

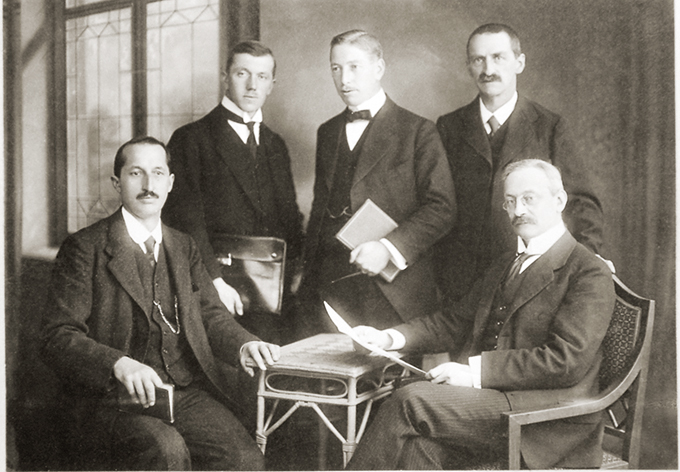
Beck (top-left) as part of the Liechtenstein delegation for custom union negotiations with Switzerland, 1920.

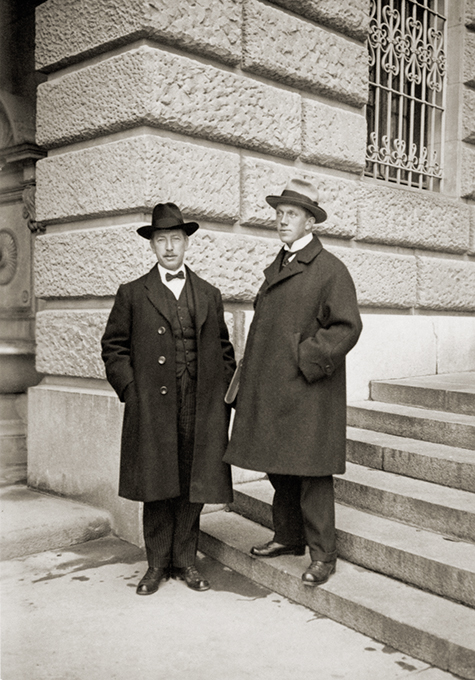
Beck (right) with Wilhelm Beck in front of the Federal Palace of Switzerland, 1920.

He represented Liechtenstein during negotiations for the country's association with the League of Nations in November 1920. He was also President of the Supreme Court in Liechtenstein from 1922 to 1930 and of the State Court from 1925 to 1930. Beck assisted the Liechtenstein government as an expert lawyer and, together with Wilhelm Beck (no relation), wrote the Liechtenstein Personal and Company law, which came into force in 1926.

Due to Beck's association with the Christian-Social People's Party he was opposed by the Progressive Citizens' Party and in 1933 they closed the Liechtenstein embassy in Bern. From 1933 he was an associate professor of Swiss and international private law at the University of Bern, and at the same time adjunct in the justice department of the Swiss federal administration.

== Personal life ==
Beck married Nelly Ackermann (24 October 1905 – 11 September 1971) on 7 December 1935 and they had two children together.

Beck died on 31 January 1973 in Bern, aged 84 years old.
