= Josef Ospelt =

Prime Minister of Liechtenstein from 1921 to 1922

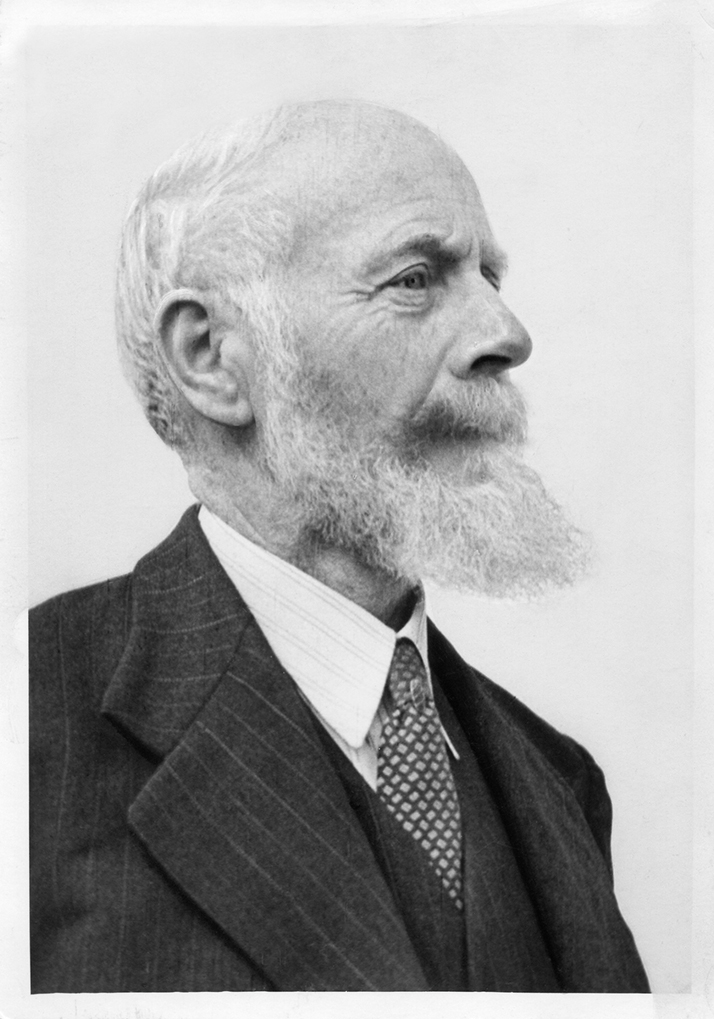

Prime Minister of Liechtenstein
- In office 5 October 1921 – 4 May 1922
- Monarch: Johann II
- Deputy: Alfons Feger
- Preceded by: Position established (From Governor)
- Succeeded by: Alfons Feger (Acting Prime Minister)

Governor of Liechtenstein
- In office 23 March 1921 – 5 October 1921
- Monarch: Johann II
- Preceded by: Josef Peer
- Succeeded by: Position abolished (Himself as Prime Minister)
- Acting; 11 December 1913 – 1 April 1914
- Monarch: Johann II
- Preceded by: Carl von In der Maur
- Succeeded by: Leopold Freiherr von Imhof

Personal details
- Born: 9 January 1881 Vaduz, Liechtenstein
- Died: 1 June 1962 (aged 81) Vaduz, Liechtenstein
- Party: Progressive Citizens' Party
- Spouse: Mathilde Ospelt (m. 1916; died 1960)
- Children: 4
- Cabinet: Josef Ospelt cabinet

Josef Ospelt (9 January 1881 – 1 June 1962) was a political figure from Liechtenstein who served as the first Prime Minister of Liechtenstein from 1921 to 1922.

== Early life and career ==
Josef Ospelt, son of Julius and Mary (maiden name Seger), was born in Vaduz on 9 January 1881. After having attended a country school in Vaduz, he began working as a government councillor under Governor of Liechtenstein Carl von In der Maur.

Upon Maur's death on 11 December 1913, he assumed the duties of governor in a provisional manner on behalf of Johann II until the appointment of the new governor, Leopold Freiherr von Imhof in April 1914. In 1918, Ospelt was a founding member of the Progressive Citizens' Party and was later elected chairman and long-time manager of the newspaper Liechtensteiner Volksblatt.

== Prime Minister of Liechtenstein ==
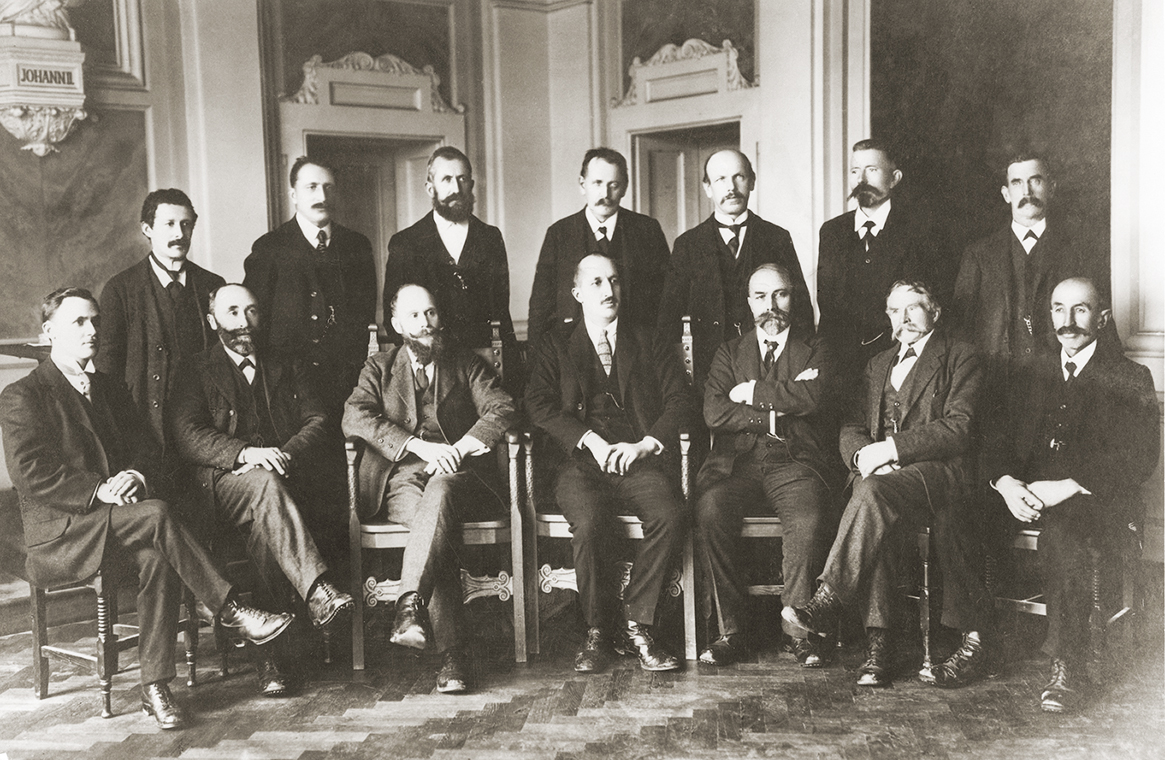
Ospelt, (third from left on front) as Prime Minister with members of the Landtag, 1921.

Upon the resignation of Josef Peer in March 1921 Ospelt was appointed by Johann II as Governor under the recommendation of Peer and the Landtag of Liechtenstein. He played a key role in Liechtenstein's constitutional revision, which had been in demand since the November 1918 Liechtenstein putsch. He was a member of the advisory committee for the drafting of the constitution and co-signed, along with Prince Karl Aloys of Liechtenstein the constitution of Liechtenstein on 5 October 1921.

Under the new constitution, the office of Governor was succeeded by Prime Minister of Liechtenstein and Ospelt, under the recommendation of the Landtag, was appointed by Johann II to serve as the first Prime Minister on 23 March 1921 under the Josef Ospelt cabinet, making him the first official Liechtensteiner head of government.

Ospelt resigned on 27 April 1922, reportedly for health reasons, but the actual reason has been widely regarded due to the Christian-Social People's Party victory in the 1922 Liechtenstein general election. He was temporarily succeeded by his deputy Alfons Feger as acting Prime Minister. Under the successor government under Gustav Schädler, Ospelt faced criticism from his term due to his ties with Johann II and former Governor Josef Peer. He defended himself in numerous publications in the Liechtensteiner Volksbatt.

== Later life ==
After his resignation as Prime Minister on, he moved with his family to Vienna. From 1918 to 1922, he served as treasurer and the royal domain administration. After 1922, he established a legal and insurance agency in Vaduz. In 1925 he was a representative of the Zurich Insurance Group. After the renewed political upheaval in 1928, Ospelt held several public offices. He was among the founding members of the Historical Society in Liechtenstein, which he headed from 1928 to 1955 as chairman and for many years on the Board of the Vintners of Vaduz. From 1930 to 1932 he served as a member of the Landtag of Liechtenstein.

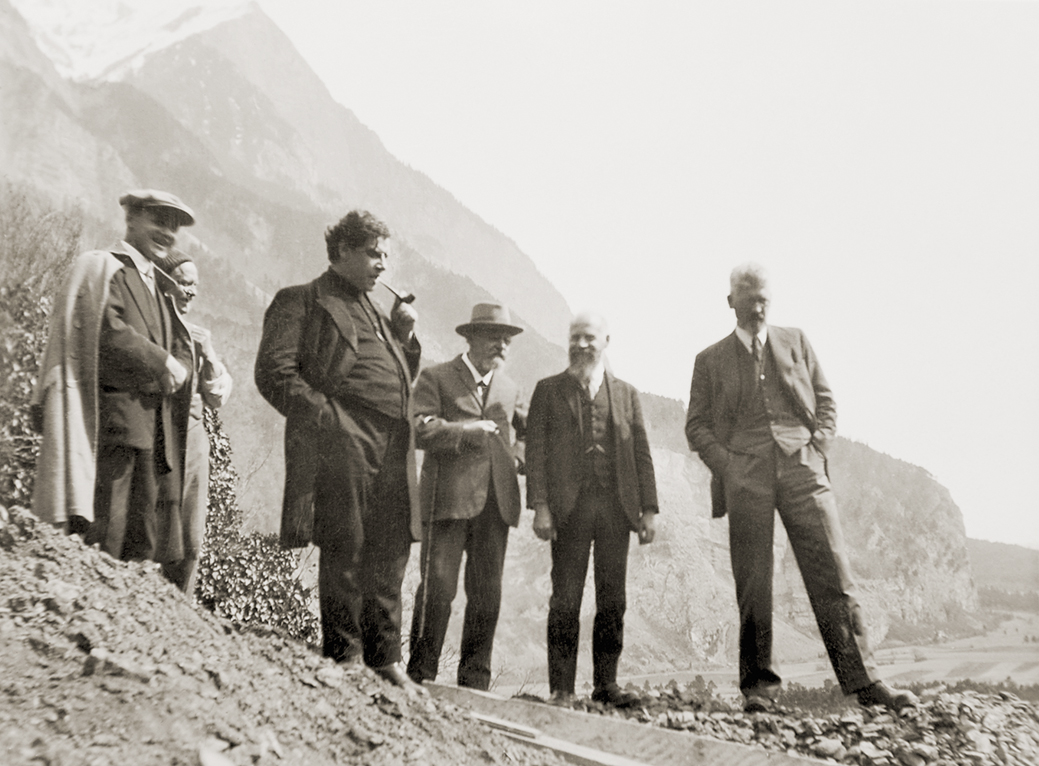
Ospelt (second from right) with other board members of the Historical Association of Liechtenstein on the site of an excavation in 1933.

He was a founding member of the Historical Association for the Principality of Liechtenstein in 1901 and a board member from 1918 to 1950. During this time he significantly contributed to the association’s publications and conducted his own research, publishing 24 articles. In addition, he organised archaeological excavations in the country throughout the 1930s and the preservation of Liechtenstein's documents from 1942. He was a contributor to the Liechtenstein National Museum, which opened in 1954.

== Personal life ==
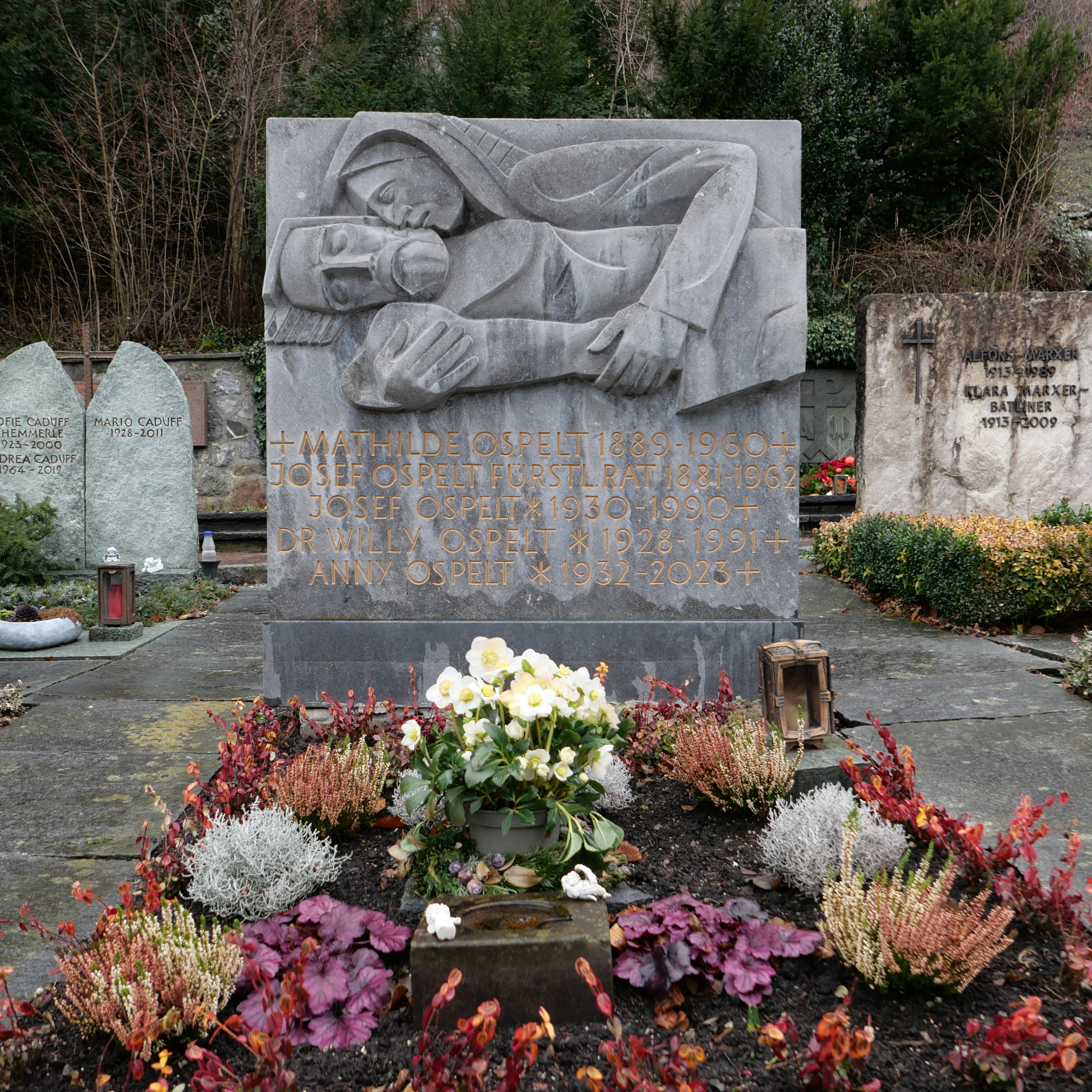
The family-grave in 2024.

Ospelt married Mathilde, née Ospelt (25 May 1889 –16 April 1960), on 2 October 1916 and they had four children together.

He died on 1 June 1962 in Vaduz, at the age of 81. He was buried at the cemetery in the city along with his wife.

== Honours ==
- Liechtenstein : Commander of the Order of Merit of the Principality of Liechtenstein (1937)
- Vatican: Knight of the Order of the Holy Sepulchre (1949)
