= Wilhelm Beck =

President of the Landtag of Liechtenstein from 1922 to 1927

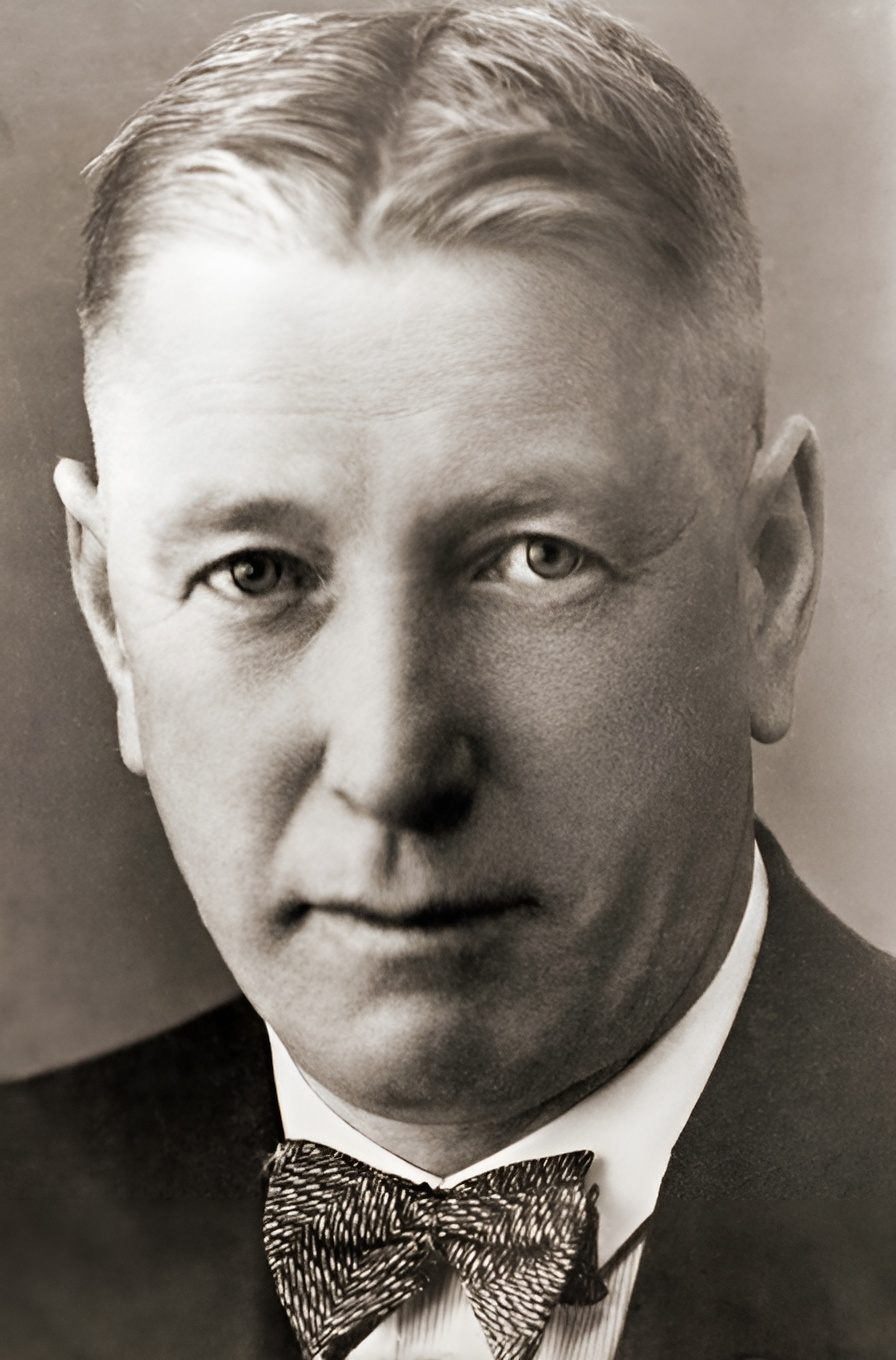

President of the Landtag of Liechtenstein
- In office January 1922 – December 1927
- Monarch: Johann II
- Preceded by: Fritz Walser
- Succeeded by: Anton Frommelt

Member of the Provisional Executive Committee
- In office 7 November 1918 – 7 December 1918
- Monarch: Johann II
- Chairman: Martin Ritter

Member of the Landtag of Liechtenstein for Oberland
- In office 6 March 1932 – 1935
- In office 30 September 1914 – 15 July 1928

Personal details
- Born: 26 March 1885 Triesenberg, Liechtenstein
- Died: 20 January 1936 (aged 50) Walenstadt, Switzerland
- Party: Christian-Social People's Party
- Spouse: Maria Anna Bürke (m. 1921)
- Children: 4, including Ivo Beck

Wilhelm Beck (/bɛk/, German: [ˈvɪlhɛlm bɛk]; 26 March 1885 – 20 January 1936) was a lawyer and politician from Liechtenstein who was the founder of the Christian-Social People's Party and later served as the President of the Landtag of Liechtenstein from 1922 to 1927. He was a member of the Landtag from 1914 to 1928 and again from 1932 to 1935.

Beck is considered one of the most influential politicians in Liechtenstein's modern history. He was heavily involved in the rapid democratization and establishment of economic and political ties with Switzerland within the country following the end of World War I, him most notably presenting the original draft for the constitution of Liechtenstein.

== Early life ==
Beck was born on 26 March 1885 in Triesenberg as the son of farmer and plasterer by the same name and Karolina Schädler as one of five children. He attended primary school in Triesenberg and then the state school in Vaduz.

From 1903 to 1905 he attended the University of St. Gallen, and from 1905 to 1911 he studied law at the University of Zurich and also at the Ludwig-Maximilians-Universität München from 1909, where he received a diploma in 1911. He was a member of the Historical Association for the Principality of Liechtenstein and published various works on topics of Liechtenstein history, such as inheritance law and constitutional history.

== Law career ==
Beck briefly worked in an insurance company in Geneva. In 1912, he worked with the Swiss lawyer and councillor Emil Grünenfelder who supported him throughout his career. He worked at a law firm in St. Gallen until 1914 when he opened his own law firm in Vaduz, Ritter & Beck Rechtsanwälte.

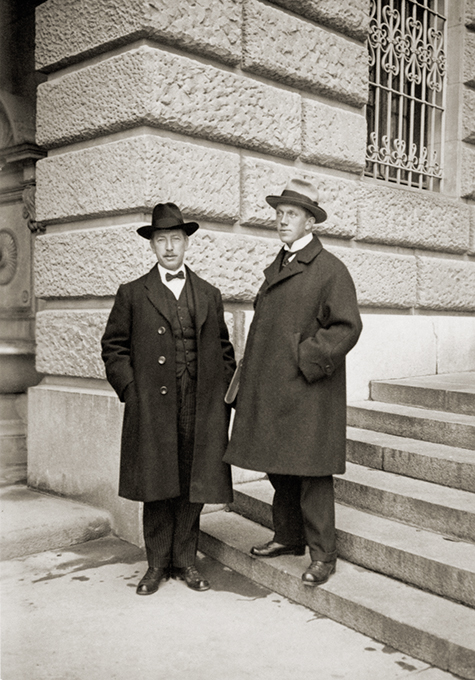
Beck (left) and Emil Beck in front of the Federal Palace of Switzerland, 1920.

In 1926, fellow lawyer Alois Ritter joined his office and the two worked together. Beck was a pioneer of Liechtenstein's financial services and fiduciary services. Together with Emil Beck (no relation), he wrote the Liechtenstein Personal and Company law, which came into force in 1926. By 1930, almost half of the country's domiciliary companies were founded by Beck and Ritter.

== Political career ==
=== Entry into politics and World War I (1910–1920) ===
In 1912, Beck became involved in politics when he publicly criticized the Liechtenstein trade regulations that were revised in 1910. In 1913 he spoke out in Triesenberg in favour of increasing the poor fund instead of building a new church in the town. He criticized the existing poor law, worker welfare and child protection as anti-social and the Liechtenstein constitution as undemocratic. In 1914 Beck formed an opposition group around himself and founded a newspaper associated with it – Oberrheinische Nachrichten, which he edited until 1921. His opposition to the political foundations of Liechtenstein and the economic crisis during World War I often led him to entering fierce debates with Leopold Freiherr von Imhof, the Governor of Liechtenstein. Beck co-founded the Christian-Social People's Party in February 1918 and he was elected into the Landtag in the same year.

By November 1918, Beck along with fellow opposition members Martin Ritter and Fritz Walser, deeply dissatisfied by Imhof's handling of the economy and who wanted a Liechtensteiner head of government, proposed a motion of no confidence against him in the Landtag of Liechtenstein on 7 November. Imhof asked for a vote of confidence and at the same time agreed to submit his resignation. While the Landtag unanimously expressed its confidence in him it was decided, against the constitution and the princely appointed Landtag members, to transfer the power of governor to a Provisional Executive Committee led by Ritter. Johann II accepted Imhof's resignation on 13 November.

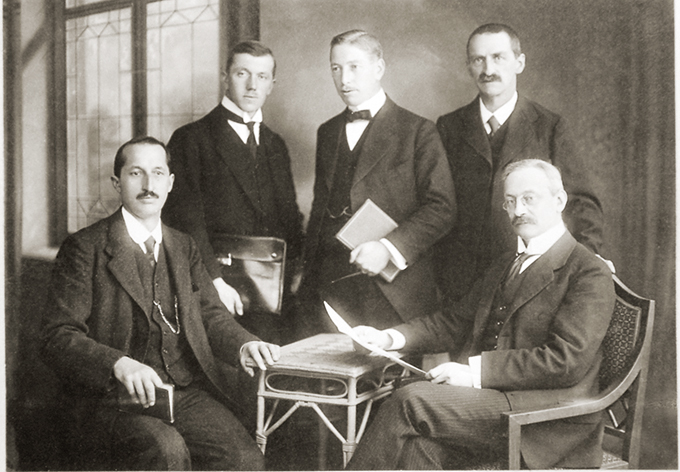
Beck (top-centre) as part of the Liechtenstein delegation for custom union negotiations with Switzerland, 1920.

Beck also served as a government councillor in the government of Prince Karl Aloys of Liechtenstein from 31 December 1918 to 31 August 1919, when he resigned. He worked in eradication Austrian influence over Liechtenstein following their defeat at the end of World War I and establishing closer relations with Switzerland, eventually cultivating in a customs union being established between the two countries in 1924.

=== Later politics (1920–1936) ===
When Johann II appointed Josef Peer as Governor in 1920, Beck and the Christian-Social People's Party opposed his appointment in contrast to the Progressive Citizens' Party as they believed the role should only be reserved for Liechtensteiners. Eventually it was agreed that Peer could take the position, but only for a 6-month period.

Beck played a key role in Liechtenstein's constitutional revision, where he called for a "total revision" of it. He wrote a draft constitution which limited the power of the prince of Liechtenstein for a constitutional monarchy on a democratic and parliamentary basis. With assistance from Josef Peer, he forwarded the demands of both parties through the agreement previously made for Peer's tenure, many of which were loosely based on the Swiss Federal Constitution. Beck's draft formed the basis of the constitution of Liechtenstein, which was ratified on 5 October 1921.

After the Christian-Social People's Party won the 1922 Liechtenstein general election Beck was elected to serve as the president of the Landtag of Liechtenstein. He also served as the chairman of the board of directors of the National Bank of Liechtenstein during this time.

In 1928 the government of Gustav Schädler was the subject of an embezzlement scandal involving the National Bank of Liechtenstein. Johann II forced his government, including Beck, to resign in June 1928 as a result, and early elections were called. Beck was not barred from re-election, but he did not run in the 1928 Liechtenstein general election. In 1932 an indictment was conducted against Beck in the State Court of Justice for violating supervisory and official duties in the administration of board of the directors of the National Bank of Liechtenstein. This resulted in him being ordered to pay for damages in 1935; though he appealed this ruling, he did not live to see its outcome.

After the 1928 Liechtenstein general election Beck took over the leadership of the Christian-Social People's Party and was again elected to the Landtag in 1932. However, during this time he was frequently absent from the Landtag due to prolonged illness, and Basil Vogt was considered to be the defacto representative of the party instead. He resigned from the Landtag in 1935.

Shortly before his death, the Christian-Social People's Party and Liechtenstein Homeland Service merged to form the Patriotic Union in 1936.

== Personal life ==
Beck married Maria Anna Bürke (8 September 1887 – 2 August 1968), a teacher from Wittenbach, on 2 June 1921 and they had four children together. His son Ivo Beck also served in the Landtag of Liechtenstein from 1953 to 1957 and again from 1966 to 1970.

Beck died on 20 January 1936 in Walenstadt, aged 50 years old.

== Bibliography ==
- Vogt, Paul (1987). 125 Jahre Landtag (in German). Vaduz: Landtag of the Principality of Liechtenstein.
