= 1921 Liechtenstein Regierungsverweser referendum =

- 28 March 1921
- Referendum on whether the Regierungsverweser Josef Peer should remain in office

Results
Choice	Votes	%
Yes	993	61.75%
No	615	38.25%
Valid votes	1,608	98.89%
Invalid or blank votes	18	1.11%
Total votes	1,626	100.00%
Registered voters/turnout	1,815	89.59%

A referendum on whether the Regierungsverweser Josef Peer should remain in office as Governor of Liechtenstein was held in Liechtenstein on 28 March 1921. Around 62% voted in favour of Peer continuing in office.

== Results ==
Choice	Votes	%
For	993	61.75
Against	615	38.25
Total	1,608	100.00
Valid votes	1,608	98.89
Invalid/blank votes	18	1.11
Total votes	1,626	100.00
Registered voters/turnout	1,815	89.59
Source: Nohlen & Stöver
