= Constitution of Liechtenstein =

Fundamental law of Liechtenstein

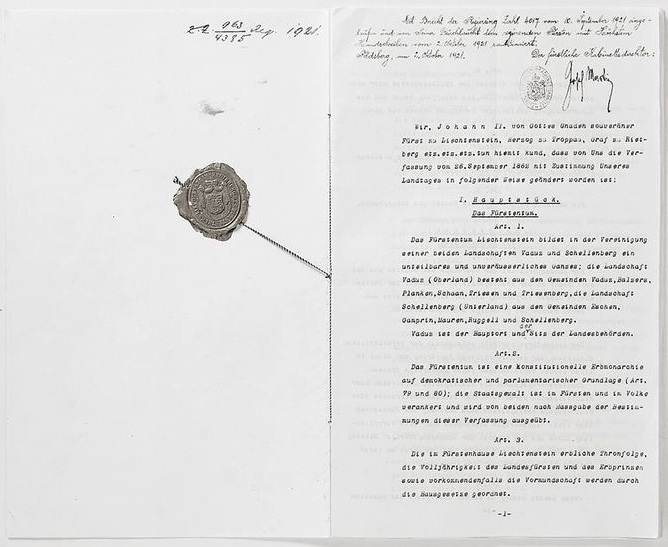
Front page of the constitution, as signed by Prince Karl Aloys and Josef Ospelt on 5 October 1921

The Constitution of the Principality of Liechtenstein (German: Verfassung des Fürstentums Liechtenstein) was promulgated on 5 October 1921, replacing the 1862 constitution.

It was granted by Johann II, Prince of Liechtenstein, and established the rule of partial parliamentary democracy mixed with that of constitutional monarchy, as well as providing for referendums on decisions of the Landtag. It also abolished the three seats in the Landtag appointed by the Prince and lowered the voting age from 24 to 21. The country replaced universal male suffrage with universal suffrage, following a national referendum in 1984.

== Background ==
Following the November 1918 Liechtenstein putsch, which had greatly undermined the 1862 constitution and in combination with the economic devastation created from World War I, it had created a large and significant basis of support for constitutional revision in the country. Primarily formed around the ideas of Wilhelm Beck, who advocated for the expansion of welfare, broader voting rights and a Liechtensteiner head of government.

This would begin a period of the next three years where both the Progressive Citizens' Party and Christian-Social People's Party worked together in creating a new constitution based on a constitutional monarchy, much of which was loosely based on the Swiss Federal Constitution. The drafting process included prominent politicians such as Wilhelm Beck, Josef Ospelt and Josef Peer. The constitution was signed into law by Prince Karl Aloys on behalf of Johann II and Josef Ospelt as a government representative on 5 October 1921.

== Chapters ==
The constitution has twelve chapters:

- Chapter I. The Principality
- Chapter II. The Reigning Prince
- Chapter III. Responsibilities of the State
- Chapter IV. General Rights and Obligations of Liechtenstein Citizens
- Chapter V. The Parliament
- Chapter VI. The National Committee
- Chapter VII. The Government
- Chapter VIII. The Courts
  - A. General Provisions
  - B. The Ordinary Courts
  - C. The Administrative Court
  - D. The Constitutional Court
- Chapter IX. Administrative Bodies and Civil Servants
- Chapter X. The Municipalities
- Chapter XI. Constitutional Amendments and Interpretation
- Chapter XII. Final Clauses

== Amendments ==
The constitution has been amended several times, including:

- 1939: Article 49, paragraph 4 inserted (allowing substitutions for Landtag members unable to attend), article 53 amended
- 1947: Article 48, paragraphs 2 and 3 and Article 64 paragraphs 2 and 4 amended
- 1958: Article 47, paragraph 1 and Article 59 amended.
- 1972: Article 16, paragraphs 6 and 7 repealed. Article 17, paragraph 1 amended.
- 1973: Article 46, paragraph 3 inserted setting the electoral threshold at 8%. Approved by referendum.
- 1982: Article 61 amended
- 1984: Article 48 paragraphs 2 and 3 and Article 64 paragraphs 2 and 4 amended.
- 1988: Article 46, paragraph 1 amended to increase number of Landtag members from 15 to 25. Approved by referendum.
- 1989: Article 52, paragraph 2 repealed. Article 63b is inserted.
- 1992: Article 31, paragraph 2 and 3 amended.
- 1994: Article 46, paragraph 2 amended and corrected.
- 1997: Article 46, paragraph 4 amended, paragraph 5 inserted, article 47 paragraph 2 repealed. Article 63ter inserted.
- 2000: Article 29, paragraph 2 on citizenship amended. Approved by referendum.
- 2003: Articles 1, 3, 4, 7 (paragraph 2), 10, 11, 13, 13bis, 13ter, 51, 62f, 62g, 63 (paragraphs 1 and 2) all amended. Article 62h inserted. Article 63, paragraph 3 repealed. Approved by referendum.
