= 1918 Liechtenstein general election =

- 11 March 1918 (first round); 18 March 1918 (second round)
- 12 of the 15 seats in the Landtag; 7 seats needed for a majority
- Turnout: 90.31%
Party	Leader	Seats
FBP	Franz Verling	7
VP	Wilhelm Beck	5
This lists parties that won seats. See the complete results below.
Results by constituency
President of the Landtag before	President of the Landtag after
Albert Schädler; Independent	Albert Schädler; Independent

General elections were held in Liechtenstein on 11 March 1918, with a second round on 18 March. They were the first elections held in the country contested by political parties, as the Christian-Social People's Party and Progressive Citizens' Party had been founded that year. The Progressive Citizens' Party emerged as the largest in the Landtag, winning seven of the 12 elected seats.

== Electoral system ==
The electoral system was changed prior to the 1918 elections to allow for direct elections using a majoritarian system, and led to the creation of the new parties. The country was divided into two constituencies, with Oberland electing seven members and three substitutes and Unterland electing five members and two substitutes. Voters wrote down the names of as many candidates as there were seats on the ballot paper, and after assembling in the polling station, were called by name to cast their ballot. If fewer candidates than the number of seats received over 50% of the vote, a second round was held in which the number of candidates was double the number of remaining seats. The remaining three seats were appointed by the Prince.

Only men aged 24 or over were allowed to vote.

== Results ==
Party	First round			Second round			Total seats
Party	Votes	%	Seats	Votes	%	Seats	Total seats
Progressive Citizens' Party			4			3	7
Christian-Social People's Party			5			0	5
Appointed by the Prince							3
Total			9			3	15
Total votes	1,585	–					
Registered voters/turnout	1,755	90.31					
Source: Nohlen & Stöver, Vogt

=== By electoral district ===
==== First round ====
Electoral district	Seats	Party	Seats won	Elected members
Oberland	7	Christian-Social People's Party	5	Wilhelm Beck; Josef Gassner; Emil Risch; Josef Sprenger; Albert Wolfinger
Oberland	7	Progressive Citizens' Party	1	Fritz Walser
Unterland	5	Progressive Citizens' Party	3	Johann Hasler; Franz Josef Hoop; Josef Marxer
Unterland	5	Christian-Social People's Party	0	–
Source: Vogt

==== Second round ====
Electoral district	Seats	Party	Seats won	Elected members
Oberland	1	Progressive Citizens' Party	1	Johann Wanger
Oberland	1	Christian-Social People's Party	0	–
Unterland	2	Progressive Citizens' Party	2	Peter Büchel; Karl Kaiser
Unterland	2	Christian-Social People's Party	0	–
Source: Vogt
