= Josef Peer =

Governor of Liechtenstein from 1920 to 1921

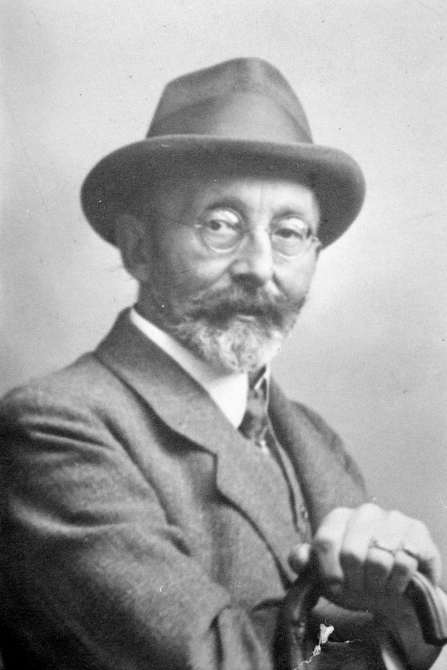

Governor of Liechtenstein
- In office 15 September 1920 – 23 March 1921
- Monarch: Johann II
- Preceded by: Prince Karl Aloys
- Succeeded by: Josef Ospelt

Personal details
- Born: 13 June 1864 Erl, Austria-Hungary
- Died: 28 June 1925 (aged 61) Vienna, Austria
- Party: Independent
- Spouse: Margareta Leone (m. 1895)
- Children: 3

Josef Peer (13 June 1864 – 28 June 1925) was an Austrian lawyer and politician who served as the Governor of Liechtenstein from 1920 to 1921.

== Early life and Austrian career ==
Peer was born on 13 June 1864 as the son of Josef Ignaz, an Austrian customs officer and his mother Fuetscher née Barbara. He spent a part of his youth in Schaan, where he attended Elementary school. He attended high school in Feldkirch then went on to study law at the University of Innsbruck, where he received a diploma in 1887. In 1894 he opened his own law firm in Feldkirch.

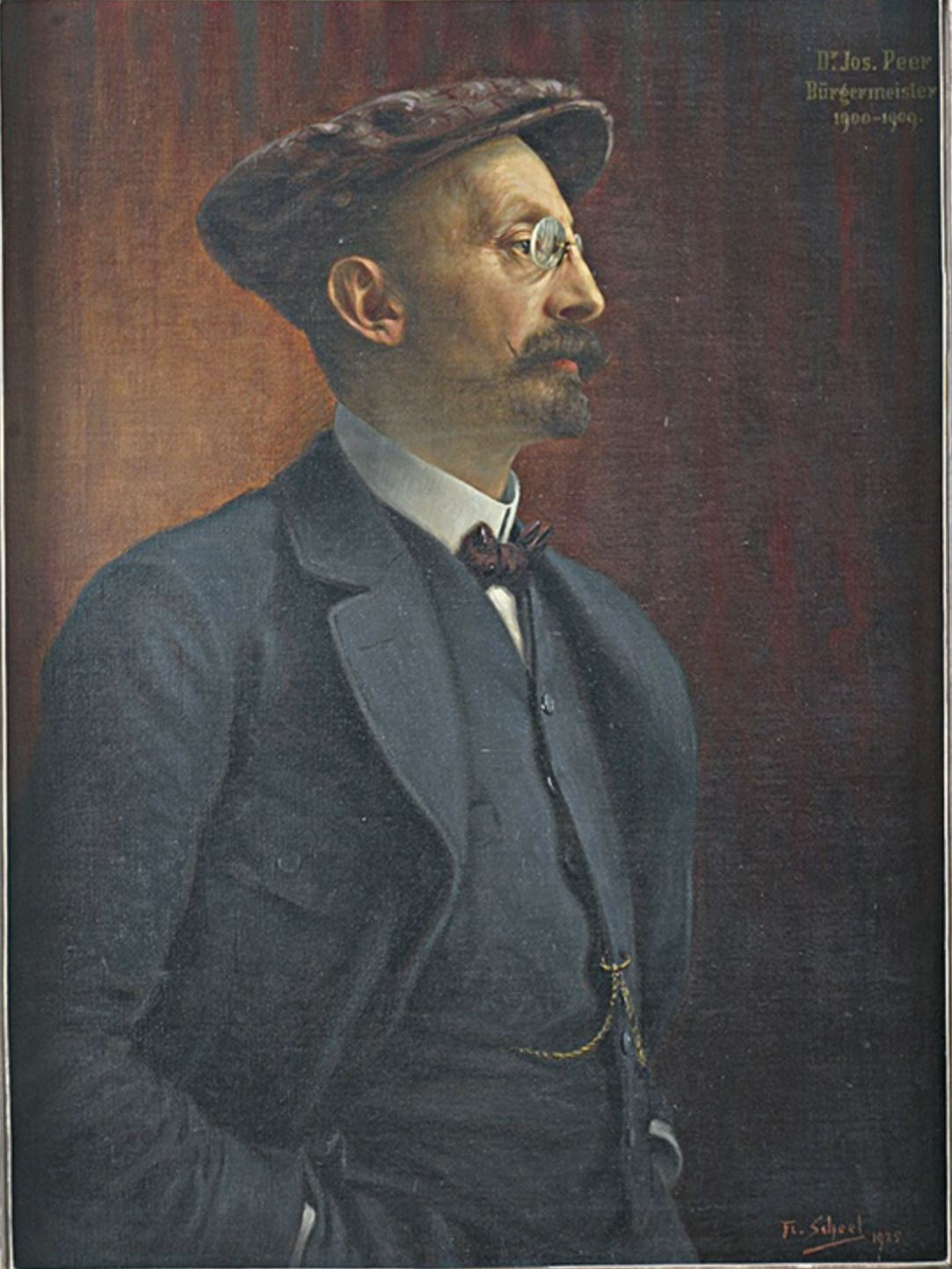
Portrait by Florus Scheel c. (1901–1909)

From 1901 to 1909 he was the mayor of Feldkirch. From 1902 to 1909 and again from 1914 to 1918 he was a member of the Landtag of Vorarlberg, where he was appointed as the state governor. Charles I was said to have been planning to appoint Peer as minister of justice, but this did not fall through due to the dissolution of Austria-Hungary in 1918.

== Governor of Liechtenstein ==
Peer was the Governor of Liechtenstein, serving from 15 September 1920 to 23 March 1921. He was appointed to the position in spring 1920 by Johann II, which was endorsed by the Progressive Citizens' Party, but faced backlash from the Christian-Social People's Party as they believed the position should only be held by Liechtensteiners. Eventually it was agreed that Peer could take the position, but only for a 6-month period.

Peer devoted himself to organizing state finances, for example by raising additional revenue through flat-rate tax payments from foreign companies. Domestically, he tried to strengthen the government's authority through stamp-tax regulation.

He played a key role in the proposals for Liechtenstein's constitutional revision. He wrote a government proposal on the matter, where he forwarded the demands of both parties through the agreement previously made for his tenure, many of which were loosely based on the Swiss Federal Constitution. He also played a significant role in the expansion of the countries constitutional judiciary, which was largely based on the Austrian model.

Once 6 months had passed since his appointment in March 1921 it was debated whether Peer should remain as the Governor of Liechtenstein. The Progressive Citizens' Party supported keeping him in office, whereas the Christian-Social People's Party insisted on upholding the previous agreement. It was decided that a referendum would be held to decide if Peer would be kept in office. While 62% voted to keep Peer as Governor, he instead chose to resign the position. He was succeeded by Josef Ospelt. Shortly after this the Constitution of Liechtenstein was ratified on 5 October 1921 and Ospelt became the Prime Minister of Liechtenstein.

== Later life and death ==
Peer moved to Vienna and worked in the Supreme Administrative Court of Austria, where he died on 28 June 1925 in Vienna, aged 61 years old.

== Personal life and family ==
Peer married Margareta Leone (16 January 1869 – 14 July 1937) on 1 May 1895 and they had three children together. His daughter, Maria Öhri went on to marry lawyer Ludwig Marxer in 1932, then Deputy Prime Minister of Liechtenstein.
