= Prince Franz Josef of Liechtenstein (1962–1991) =

Son of Prince Franz Joseph II (1962–1991)

Prince Wenzel
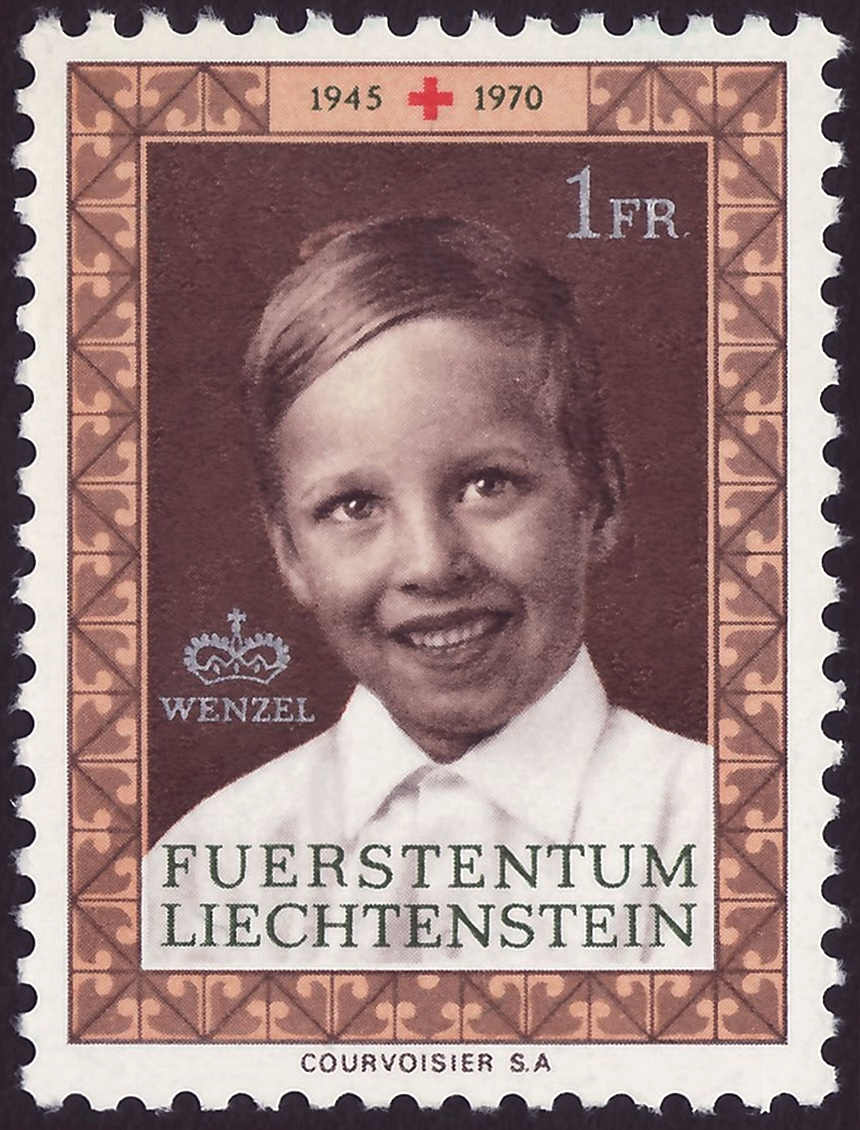
- Prince Wenzel on a 1970 commemorative stamp
- Born: 19 November 1962; Zürich, Switzerland
- Died: 28 February 1991 (aged 28); Vaduz Castle, Vaduz, Liechtenstein
- Burial: St Florian Cathedral, Vaduz, Liechtenstein
Names
- Franz Josef Wenceslaus Georg Maria
- House: Liechtenstein
- Father: Franz Joseph II, Prince of Liechtenstein
- Mother: Countess Georgina von Wilczek

Prince Franz Josef of Liechtenstein (Franz Josef Wenceslaus Georg Maria; 19 November 1962 – 28 February 1991), popularly known as Prince Wenzel, was a member of Liechtenstein princely family. He was the youngest son of Franz Joseph II, Prince of Liechtenstein and his wife, Countess Georgina von Wilczek, and thus younger brother of Hans-Adam II, Prince of Liechtenstein.

== Biography ==
He was born on 19 November 1962, as the youngest son of the former reigning Prince Franz Joseph II and the youngest brother of the current reigning Prince Hans-Adam II. His mother was Countess Georgina of Wilczek. He was known, familiarly, as "Wenzel".

In 1982, he entered the Royal Military Academy Sandhurst, and a year later was a lieutenant in the Grenadier Guards in London. He then studied medicine at the University of Fribourg and the University of Zürich. He worked as an assistant doctor at the Rorschach Hospital.

Despite being from the wealthy House of Liechtenstein, it has been reported that he rejected many of the luxuries presented by the family and instead opted to live a more modest lifestyle.

Prince Wenzel died unexpectedly on 28 February 1991 in the guesthouse of Vaduz Castle. His exact cause of death is unknown.

== Honours ==
- Liechtenstein: Recipient of the 70th Birthday Medal of Prince Franz Joseph II.

== Ancestry ==
Ancestors of Prince Franz Josef of Liechtenstein (1962–1991)

8. Prince Alfred of Liechtenstein
4. Prince Alois of Liechtenstein
9. Princess Henriette of Liechtenstein
2. Franz Joseph II, Prince of Liechtenstein
10. Archduke Karl Ludwig of Austria
5. Archduchess Elisabeth Amalie of Austria
11. Infanta Maria Theresa of Portugal
1. Prince Franz Josef of Liechtenstein
12. Count Johann Nepomuk von Wilczek
6. Count Ferdinand Maria von Wilczek
13. Countess Elisabeth Wilhelmine Kinsky of Wchinitz and Tettau
3. Countess Georgina Norberta von Wilczek
14. Count Octavian Zdenko Kinsky of Wchinitz and Tettau
7. Countess Norbertine Kinsky of Wchinitz and Tettau
15. Countess Georgine Ernestine Festétics de Tólna
