= Order of Merit of the Principality of Liechtenstein =

Order of Merit of the Principality of Liechtenstein Fürstlich liechtensteinischer Verdienstorden
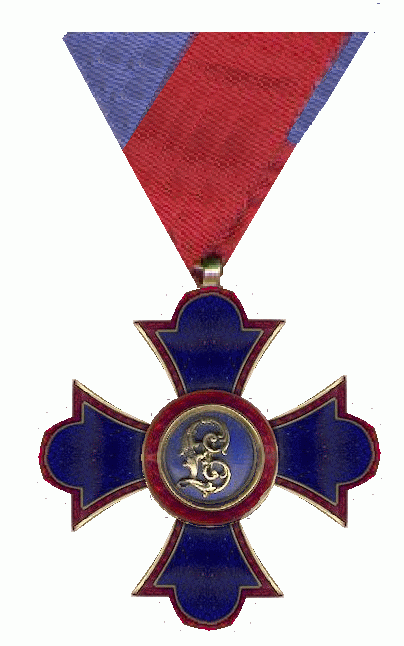
- Medal of the Order

Awarded by Prince of Liechtenstein
- Established: 22 July 1937
- Awarded for: Service to the Principality of Liechtenstein.
- Status: Currently constituted
- Sovereign: Hans-Adam II, Prince of Liechtenstein
- Grades: Knight Grand Cross, Special Class; Knight/Dame Grand Cross, 1st Class; Knight/Dame Grand Cross; Knight Grand Officer; Knight Commander; Knight Officer; Knight; Medal of Merit
- Ribbon bar of the Order

The Order of Merit of the Principality of Liechtenstein (German: Fürstlich liechtensteinischer Verdienstorden) is an order of merit of the Principality of Liechtenstein that is awarded for services rendered to the principality. Franz I, Prince of Liechtenstein founded the Order of Merit of the Principality of Liechtenstein on 22 July 1937 (on the anniversary of his marriage).

== Grades of the Order ==
The order is presented in six grades of two ranks of Knight and Dame, depending on the criteria of the recipient.

- Grand Cross, Special Class. (Grand star in Gold with Diamonds)
- Grand Cross, 1st Class. (Ordinary star in Gold with Diamonds)
- Grand Cross. (Ordinary Star)
- Grand Officer (Necklet or Bow, with Ordinary star)
- Commander (Necklet or Bow)
- Officer (Medal with Gold Cross)
- Knight (Medal with Silver Cross)
- Medal (Medal with Bronze Cross)

== Recipients ==
Recipients have included:

=== Grand star ===
- Hans-Adam II, Prince of Liechtenstein – Grand Star
- Alois, Hereditary Prince of Liechtenstein – Grand Star
- Franz I, Prince of Liechtenstein – Grand Star (1937)
- Franz Joseph II, Prince of Liechtenstein – Grand Star
- Gina, Princess of Liechtenstein – Grand Star
- Albrecht, Duke of Bavaria – Grand Star
- Marie, Princess Liechtenstein – Grand Star
- Prince Philipp of Liechtenstein – Grand Star
- Prince Nikolaus of Liechtenstein – Grand Star
- Sophie, Hereditary Princess of Liechtenstein – Grand Star
- Princess Margaretha of Liechtenstein – Dame Grand Cross, 1st Class
- Ferdinand Nigg – Grand Star
- Alexander Van der Bellen – Grand Star (2018)

=== Grand Cross ===
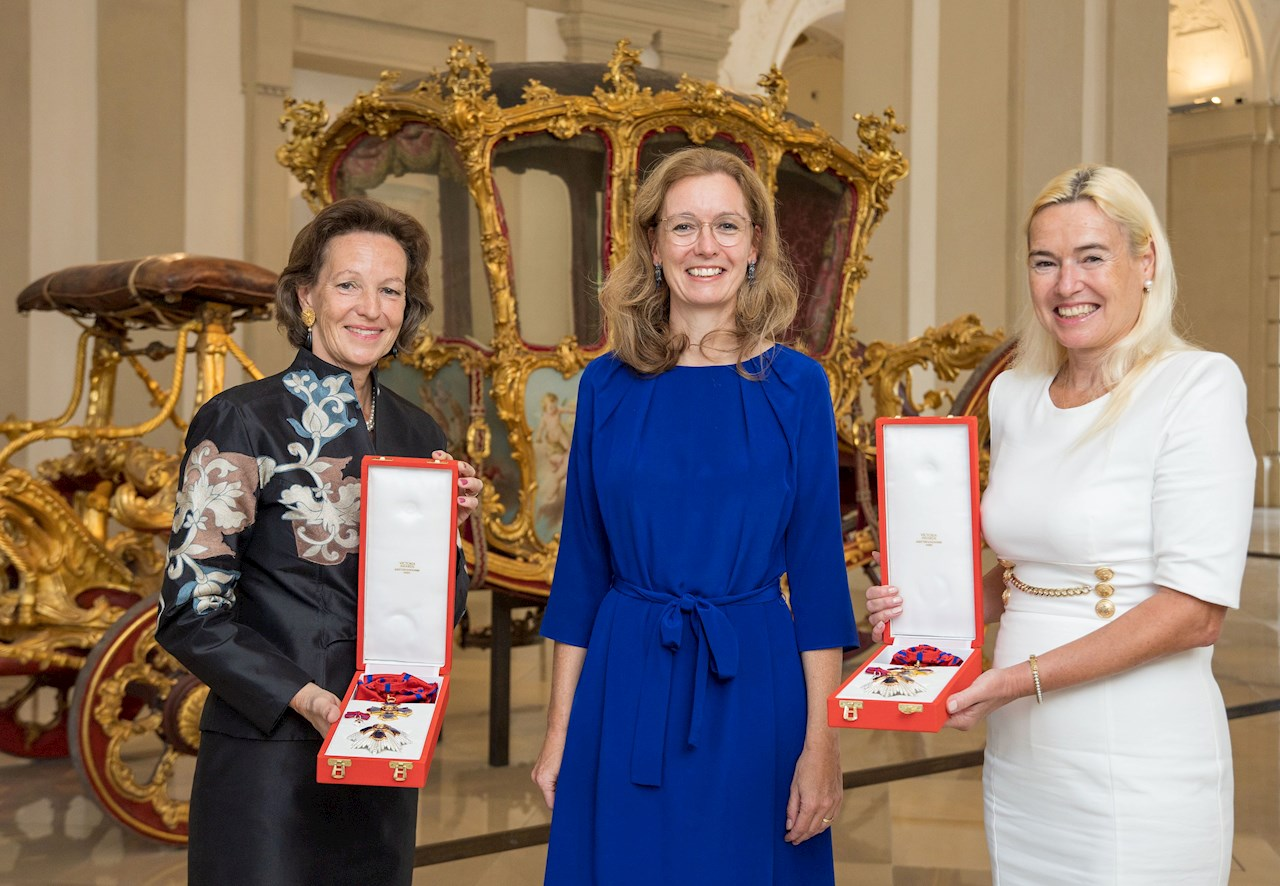
Elisabeth Tichy-Fisslberger (left) and Petra Schneebauer (right) being presented the award by Sabine Monauni on behalf on Prince Alois in September 2021

- Josef Hoop – Grand Cross (1937)
- Martin Risch – Grand Cross
- Alfons Goop – Grand Cross (1970)
- Franz Nägele – Grand Cross
- Hans Brunhart – Grand Cross
- Markus Büchel – Grand Cross (1994)
- Alois Mock – Grand Cross
- Wolfgang Schüssel – Grand Cross (2000)
- Wolfgang Brandstetter – Grand Cross (2019)
- Alexander Schallenberg – Grand Cross (2019)
- Elisabeth Tichy-Fisslberger Grand Cross (2021)
- Petra Schneebauer Grand Cross (2021)
- Markus Wallner – Grand Cross (2022)
- Magnus Brunner – Grand Cross (2024)
- Harald Mahrer – Grand Cross (2024)
- Albert Frick – Grand Cross (2025)
- Daniel Risch – Grand Cross (2025)
- Alexander Frick – Grand Cross with Diamonds (1967)
- Alfred Hilbe – Grand Cross with Diamonds (2003)
- Walter Kieber – Grand Cross with Diamonds (2003)
- Karlheinz Kopf – Grand Cross with Diamonds (2017)

=== Commander's Cross ===
- Hansjörg Frick – Commander's Cross with Star (2003)
- Rita Kieber-Beck – Commander's Cross with Star (2003)
- Martin Meyer – Commander's Cross with Star (2013)
- Thomas Zwiefelhofer – Commander's Cross with Star (2017)
- Johannes Matt – Commander's Cross with Star (2006)
- Otto Schaedler – Commander's Cross (1939)
- David Strub – Commander's Cross (1954)
- Johann Beck – Commander's Cross (1976)
- Armin Meier – Commander's Cross (1981)
- Hilmar Ospelt – Commander's Cross (1981)
- Anton Gerner – Commander's Cross (1986)
- Emma Brogle – Commander's Cross (1991)
- Lorenz Hasler – Commander's Cross (1991)
- Cornelia Gassner – Commander's Cross (1994)
- Thomas Büchel – Commander's Cross (1994)
- Peter Lampert – Commander's Cross (1999)
- Johannes Kaiser – Commander's Cross (2003)
- Walter Kieber – Commander's Cross (2003)
- Marlies Amann-Marxer – Commander's Cross (2017)

=== Officer's Cross ===
- Ida Ospelt-Amann – Officer's Cross with Gold (1980)

=== Knight's Cross ===
- Ferdinand Risch – Knight's Cross (1937)
- Josef Sele – Knight's Cross (1956)
- Arthur Konrad – Knight's Cross (1997)
- Herbert Hilbe – Knight's Cross (2000)
- Karlheinz Ospelt – Knight's Cross (2007)
- Xaver Hoch – Knight's Cross (2007)
- Hubert Sele – Knight's Cross (2015)
- Ewald Ospelt – Knight's Cross (2019)
- Donath Oehri – Knight's Cross (2019)
- Manfred Bischof – Knight's Cross (2023)
- Hansjörg Büchel – Knight's Cross (2023)
- Freddy Kaiser – Knight's Cross (2023)
- Maria Kaiser-Eberle – Knight's Cross (2023)
- Norman Wohlwend – Knight's Cross (2023)

=== Medal of Merit ===
- Ludwig Ospelt – Medal of Merit
- Philipp Elkuch – Medal of Merit (1937)

== See also ==
- Orders, decorations, and medals of Liechtenstein
