= Marie, Princess of Liechtenstein =

Princess of Liechtenstein from 1989 to 2021

Marie
- Duchess of Troppau; Duchess of Jägerndorf; Countess of Rietberg
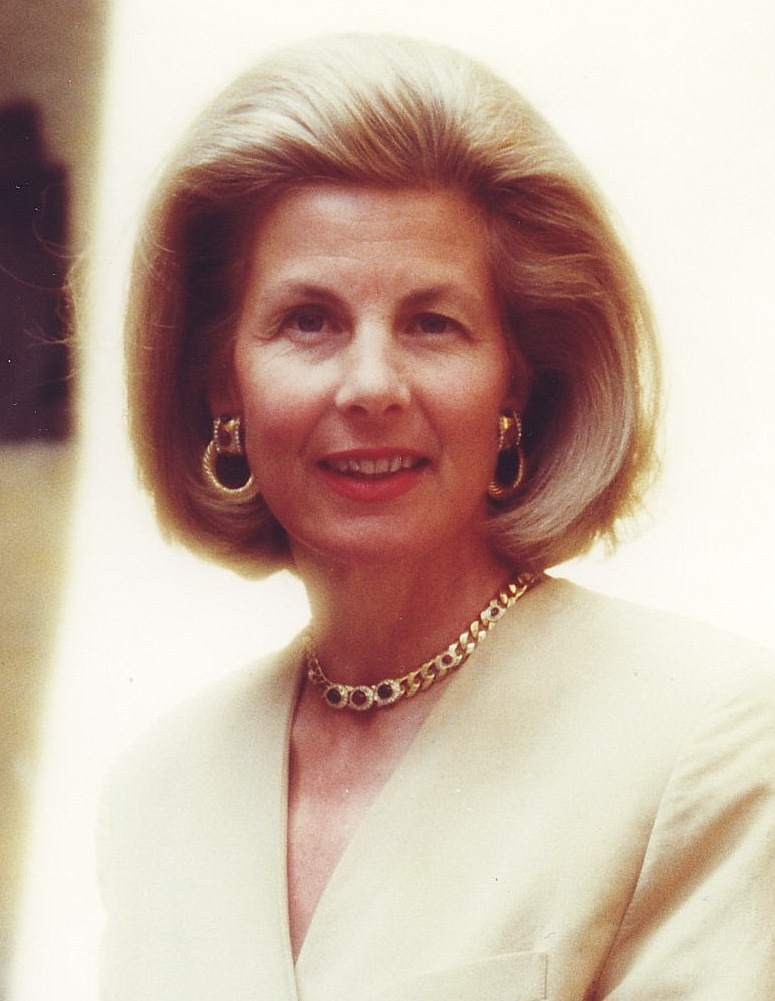

Princess consort of Liechtenstein
- Tenure: 13 November 1989 – 21 August 2021
- Born: Countess Marie Aglaë Bonaventura Theresia Kinsky von Wchinitz und Tettau; 14 April 1940; Prague, Protectorate of Bohemia and Moravia
- Died: 21 August 2021 (aged 81); Grabs, St. Gallen, Switzerland
- Burial: 28 August 2021; Cathedral of St. Florin, Vaduz, Liechtenstein
- Spouse: Hans-Adam II, Prince of Liechtenstein (m. 1967)
- Issue: Alois, Hereditary Prince of Liechtenstein; Prince Maximilian; Prince Constantin; Princess Tatjana
- House: Kinsky (by birth); Liechtenstein (by marriage)
- Father: Count Ferdinand Kinsky von Wchinitz und Tettau
- Mother: Countess Henriette von Ledebur-Wicheln
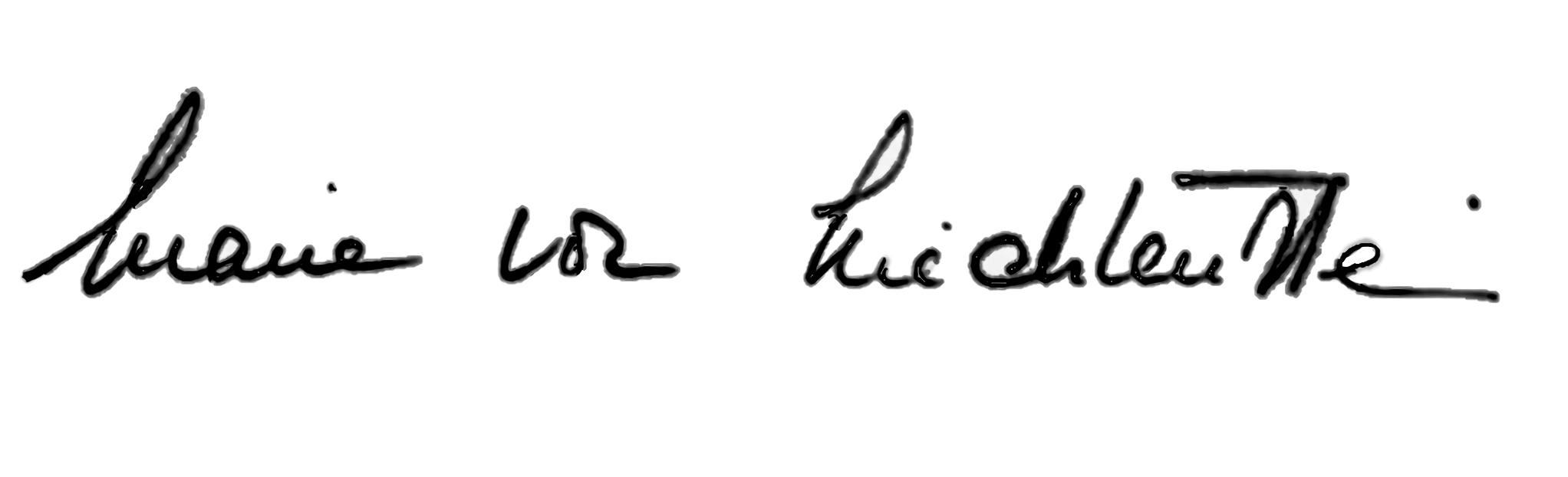
- Signature

Marie, Princess of Liechtenstein, Duchess of Troppau, Duchess of Jägerndorf, Countess of Rietberg (née Countess Marie Aglaë Bonaventura Theresia Kinsky von Wchinitz und Tettau; 14 April 1940 – 21 August 2021) was Princess of Liechtenstein from 13 November 1989 until her death in 2021 as the wife of Prince Hans-Adam II. By birth, she was a member of the House of Kinsky.

== Biography ==
=== Early life and career ===
Countess Marie was born on 14 April 1940 in Prague as the daughter of Count Ferdinand Kinsky of Wchinitz and Tettau (1907–1969) and his wife, Countess Henriette Caroline of Ledebur-Wicheln (1910–2002) in the Nazi-run Protectorate of Bohemia and Moravia (now the Czech Republic). Her paternal grandparents were Count Ferdinand Vincenz Kinsky von Wchinitz und Tettau and Princess Aglae Franziska von Auersperg (1868–1919). Her maternal grandparents were Count Eugen Rudolf Maria von Ledebur-Wicheln and Countess Eleonore Larisch von Moennich, great-granddaughter of Barbu Dimitrie Știrbei, Prince of Wallachia.

Countess Marie spent the first five years of her life in the Horažďovice family estate in Bohemia. In 1945, her family fled to Germany where Marie began her education in Ering am Inn from 1946 to 1950. Then she attended Lioba Sisters' boarding school at the Wald Monastery in Baden-Württemberg for eight years. In 1957, she spent an extended period of time in England to improve her English. She then attended the Academy for Applied Arts at LMU Munich, graduating in 1961. Following some time in Paris to improve her French, she began working as a commercial artist for a printing house in Dachau, Germany, until 1965.

=== Marriage and family ===
In 1966, Countess Marie became engaged to Hans-Adam II, Prince of Liechtenstein, her second cousin once removed. The couple married at Cathedral of St. Florin in Vaduz, Liechtenstein on 30 July 1967. They had four children and fifteen grandchildren:

- Alois Philipp Maria, Hereditary Prince of Liechtenstein, Regent of Liechtenstein, Count of Rietberg (born on 11 June 1968 in Zürich, Canton of Zürich, Switzerland). Married to German Duchess Sophie Elisabeth Marie Gabrielle in Bavaria (born on 28 October 1967) in July 1993. They have four children:
  - Prince Joseph Wenzel Maximilian Maria of Liechtenstein, Count of Rietberg (born on 24 May 1995 at Portland Hospital in London, England, United Kingdom).
  - Princess Marie Caroline Elisabeth Immaculata of Liechtenstein, Countess of Rietberg (born on 17 October 1996 in Grabs, Canton of St. Gallen, Switzerland).
  - Prince Georg Antonius Constantin Maria of Liechtenstein, Count of Rietberg (born on 20 April 1999 in Grabs, Canton of St. Gallen, Switzerland).
  - Prince Nikolaus Sebastian Alexander Maria of Liechtenstein, Count of Rietberg (born on 6 December 2000 in Grabs, Canton of St. Gallen, Switzerland).
- Prince Maximilian Nikolaus Maria of Liechtenstein, Count of Rietberg (born on 16 May 1969 in St. Gallen, Canton of St. Gallen, Switzerland), known professionally as Max von Liechtenstein. Married to Panamanian-American Angela Gisela Brown (born on 3 February 1958) in January 2000. They have one child:
  - Prince Alfons "Alfonso" Constantin Maria of Liechtenstein, Count of Rietberg (born on 18 May 2001 in London, England, United Kingdom).
- Prince Constantin Ferdinand Maria of Liechtenstein, Count of Rietberg (born on 15 March 1972 in St. Gallen, Canton of St. Gallen, Switzerland – died on 5 December 2023), known professionally as Constantin Liechtenstein. Married to Austrian Countess Marie Gabriele Franziska Kálnoky de Kőröspatak (born on 16 July 1975) in May 1999. They have three children:
  - Prince Moritz Emanuel Maria of Liechtenstein, Count of Rietberg (born on 27 May 2003 in New York City, New York, United States)
  - Princess Georgina "Gina" Maximiliana Tatiana Maria of Liechtenstein, Countess of Rietberg (born on 23 July 2005 in Vienna, Austria)
  - Prince Benedikt Ferdinand Hubertus Maria of Liechtenstein, Count of Rietberg (born on 18 May 2008 in Vienna, Austria)
- Princess Tatjana Nora Maria of Liechtenstein, Countess of Rietberg (born on 10 April 1973 in St. Gallen, Canton of St. Gallen, Switzerland), also known after marriage as Tatjana von Lattorff. She graduated from European Business School in Madrid, Spain and is fluent in German, English, French and Spanish. Princess Tatjana is a patron of SOS Children's Village Liechtenstein, president of Princess Gina of Liechtenstein Foundation and also president of the board of trustees of Prince Franz Josef of Liechtenstein Foundation. In 2020, she became the president of the Vienna International School Association. Married to German Matthias Claus-Just Carl Philipp von Lattorff (born on 25 March 1968 in Graz, Styria, Austria) on 5 June 1999. Philipp is the eldest son of Claus-Jürgen von Lattorff and Countess Julia Batthyány von Nemet-Ujvár. He work for Boehringer Ingelheim as a CEO and is the vice president of Federation of Austrian Industries.
  They have seven children:
  - Lukas Maria von Lattorff (born on 13 May 2000 in Wiesbaden, Hesse, Germany)
  - Elisabeth Maria Angela Tatjana von Lattorff (born on 25 January 2002 in Grabs, Canton of St. Gallen, Switzerland)
  - Marie Teresa von Lattorff (born on 18 January 2004 in Grabs, Canton of St. Gallen, Switzerland)
  - Camilla Maria Katharina von Lattorff (born on 4 November 2005 in Monza, Lombardy, Italy)
  - Anna Pia Theresia Maria von Lattorff (born on 3 August 2007 in Goldgeben, Lower Austria, Austria)
  - Sophie Katharina Maria von Lattorff (born on 30 October 2009 in Goldgeben, Lower Austria, Austria)
  - Maximilian Maria von Lattorff (born on 17 December 2011 in Goldgeben, Lower Austria, Austria)

=== Charity work and interests ===
Princess Marie was involved in many organizations within Liechtenstein, with her focus being on education, culture and the arts. Princess Marie served as president of the Liechtenstein Red Cross from 1985 to 2015. Under her presidency, in addition to its domestic activities, the Liechtenstein Red Cross contributed to foreign aid, especially during the Yugoslav wars in the 1990s. As president and patron of the Association for Curative Education in Liechtenstein (German: Verein für Heilpädagogische Hilfe), a foundation for people in Liechtenstein with special needs, she promoted the inclusion of people with disabilities. In 1968, after Warsaw Pact invasion of Czechoslovakia, Princess Marie became one of the signatories of a protest telegram to the Soviet Union Embassy in Bern titled "Freedom for ČSSR". She also took part in a protest demonstration in Vaduz.

In the 1970s, Princess Marie became the patron and member of the board of Liechtensteinische Gesellschaft für Umweltschutz (LGU), Liechtenstein's society for environmental protection. She also chaired the honorary committee of the Internationalen Meisterkurse, which held in Vaduz every year since 1970 as a further education and concert platform for music students from all over the world. She was the president of Society for Orthopaedic Aid from 1983 to 2005 and an honorary president since 2005. She was also a patron of Verband Liechtensteinischer Familienhilfen, a family support organisation. Princess Marie was a member of the historical society of Liechtenstein.

== Death ==
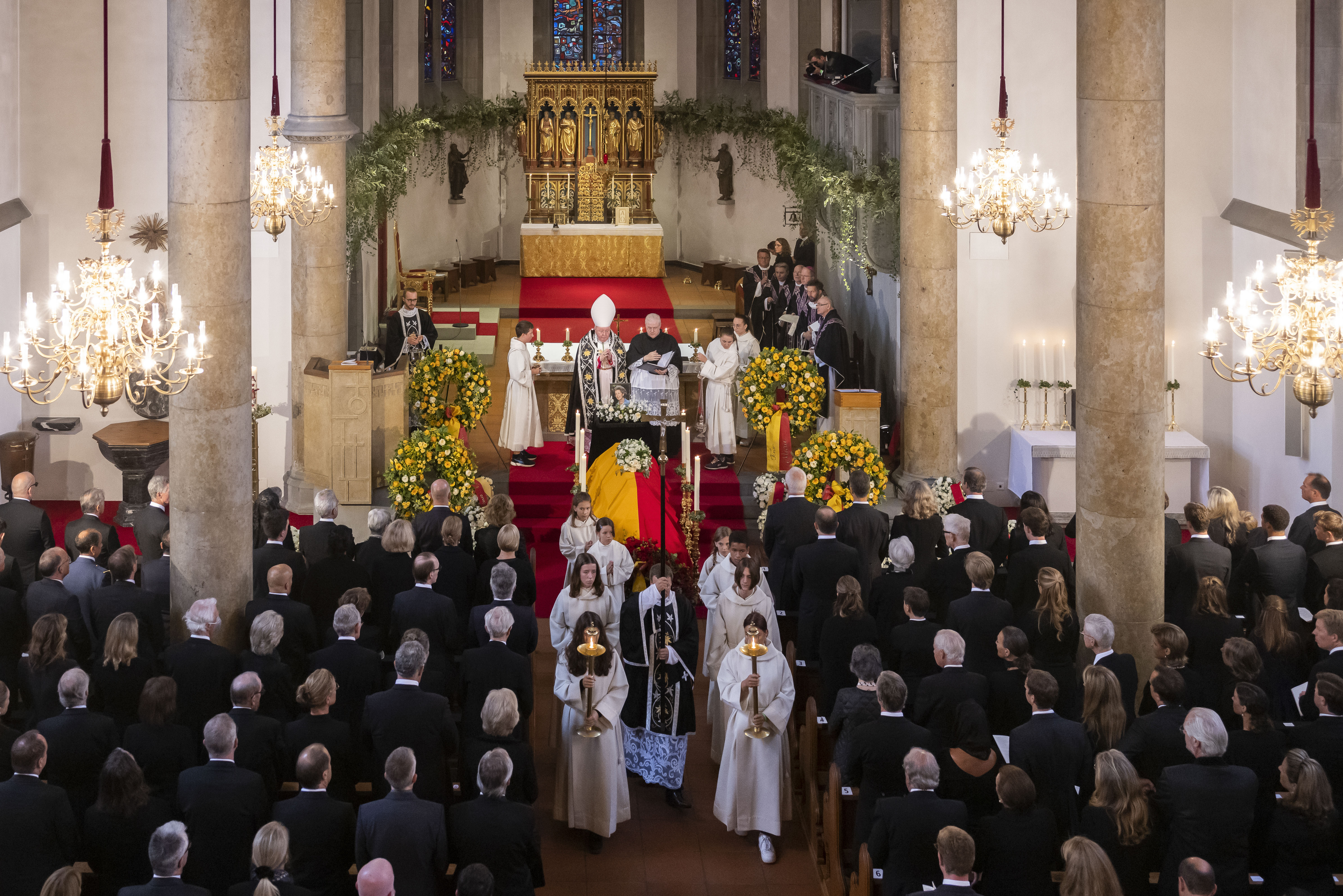
Funeral of Princess Marie at the Cathedral of St. Florin

On 18 August 2021, Princess Marie suffered a stroke. She died three days later at 16:43 (CEST) in the Cantonal Hospital in Grabs, Switzerland, at the age of 81. She was survived by her husband, her four children and fifteen grandchildren.

A seven-day mourning period was declared in Liechtenstein upon her death, and flags were flown at half-mast. Her body lay in state at the Cathedral of St. Florin from 26 to 27 August, and her funeral on 28 August was broadcast on Landeskanal. In addition to the Princely Family, Queen Sofía of Spain, Princess Caroline of Hanover as well as Prince Guillaume and Princess Sibilla of Luxembourg attended the Catholic funeral service.

== Honours ==
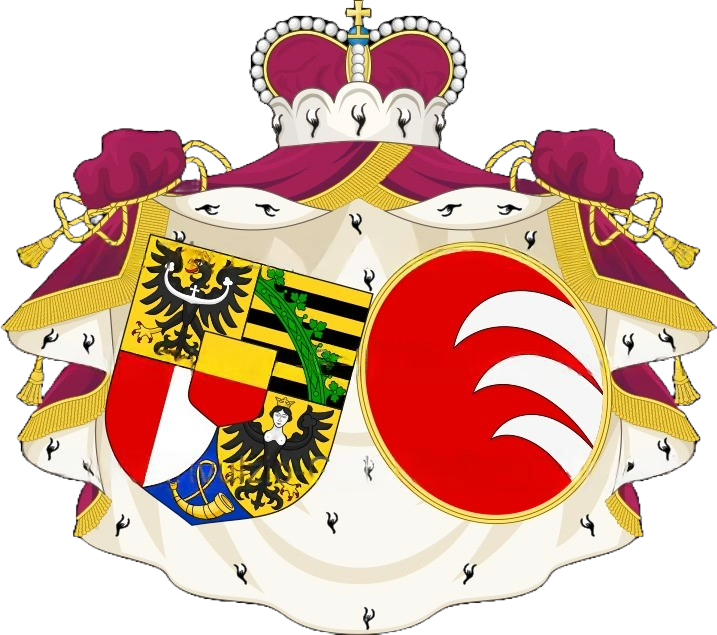
Coat of arms of Princess Marie

=== National ===
- Liechtenstein: Knight Grand Cross, Special Class of the Order of Merit
- Liechtenstein: Recipient of the 70th Birthday Medal of Prince Franz Joseph II

=== Foreign ===
- Austria: Grand Cross, Special Class of the Order of Honour

== See also ==
- Princely Family of Liechtenstein

Marie, Princess of Liechtenstein House of Kinsky Born: 14 April 1940 Died: 21 August 2021
Liechtensteiner royalty
Preceded by Georgina von Wilczek	Princess consort of Liechtenstein; 1989 – 2021	Vacant
