= Franz Joseph II of Liechtenstein =

Prince of Liechtenstein from 1938 to 1989

Franz Joseph II
- Duke of Troppau and Jägerndorf; Count of Rietberg
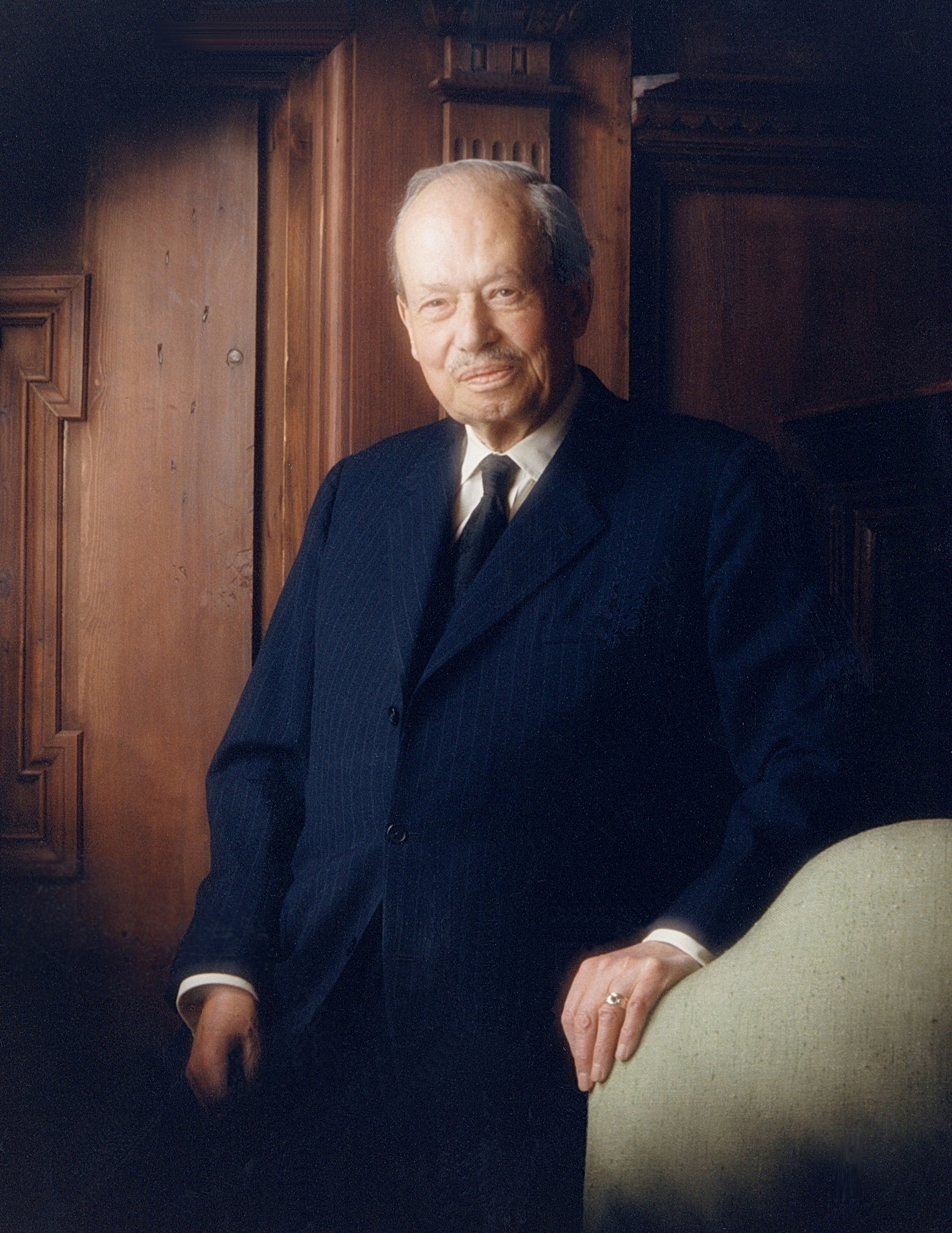

Prince of Liechtenstein
- Reign: 25 July 1938 – 13 November 1989
- Predecessor: Franz I
- Successor: Hans-Adam II
- Prime Ministers: See list: Josef Hoop Alexander Frick Gerard Batliner Alfred Hilbe Walter Kieber Hans Brunhart

Regent of Liechtenstein
- Regency: 31 March 1938 - 25 July 1938
- Monarch: Franz I
- Prime Ministers: Josef Hoop
- Born: 16 August 1906; Schloss Frauenthal, Deutschlandsberg, Austria-Hungary
- Died: 13 November 1989 (aged 83); Grabs, St. Gallen, Switzerland
- Burial: St. Florian Cathedral, Vaduz
- Spouse: Countess Georgina von Wilczek (m. 1943; died 1989)
- Issue: Hans-Adam II, Prince of Liechtenstein; Prince Philipp; Prince Nikolaus; Princess Nora, Marchioness of Mariño; Prince Franz Josef "Wenzel"
Names
- Franz Josef Maria Alois Alfred Karl Johannes Heinrich Michael Georg Ignaz Benediktus Gerhardus Majella
- House: Liechtenstein
- Father: Prince Alois of Liechtenstein
- Mother: Archduchess Elisabeth Amalie of Austria
- Religion: Roman Catholic

Franz Joseph II (Franz Josef Maria Alois Alfred Karl Johannes Heinrich Michael Georg Ignaz Benediktus Gerhardus Majella; (Note: German pronunciation: [fʁants ˈjoːzɛf maˈʁiːa ˈʔaːlɔʏs ˈʔalfʁeːt ˈkaʁl joˈhanəs ˈhaɪnʁɪç ˈmɪçaʔeːl ˈɡeːɔʁk ˈʔɪɡnaːts beneˈdɪktʊs ɡɛʁˈhaʁdʊs maˈjɛla], Southern Standard German: [frants ˈjoːzɛf maˈriːa ˈaːlɔʏs ˈalfreːd ˈkarl joˈhanəs ˈhaɪnrɪç ˈmɪçaeːl ˈɡeːɔrɡ ˈɪɡnaːts beneˈdɪktʊs ɡɛrˈhardʊs maˈjɛla].) 16 August 1906 – 13 November 1989) was the reigning Prince of Liechtenstein from 25 July 1938 until his death in November 1989.

Franz Joseph was the son of Prince Alois of Liechtenstein and Archduchess Elisabeth Amalie of Austria. He succeeded his childless grand-uncle, Prince Franz I, after his father renounced his right of succession in his favour in 1923. He was a popular sovereign in Liechtenstein. He was the first ruling prince to live full-time in the principality. He also oversaw the economic development of Liechtenstein from a poor agricultural backwater into one of the richest countries (per capita) in the world.

== Early life ==
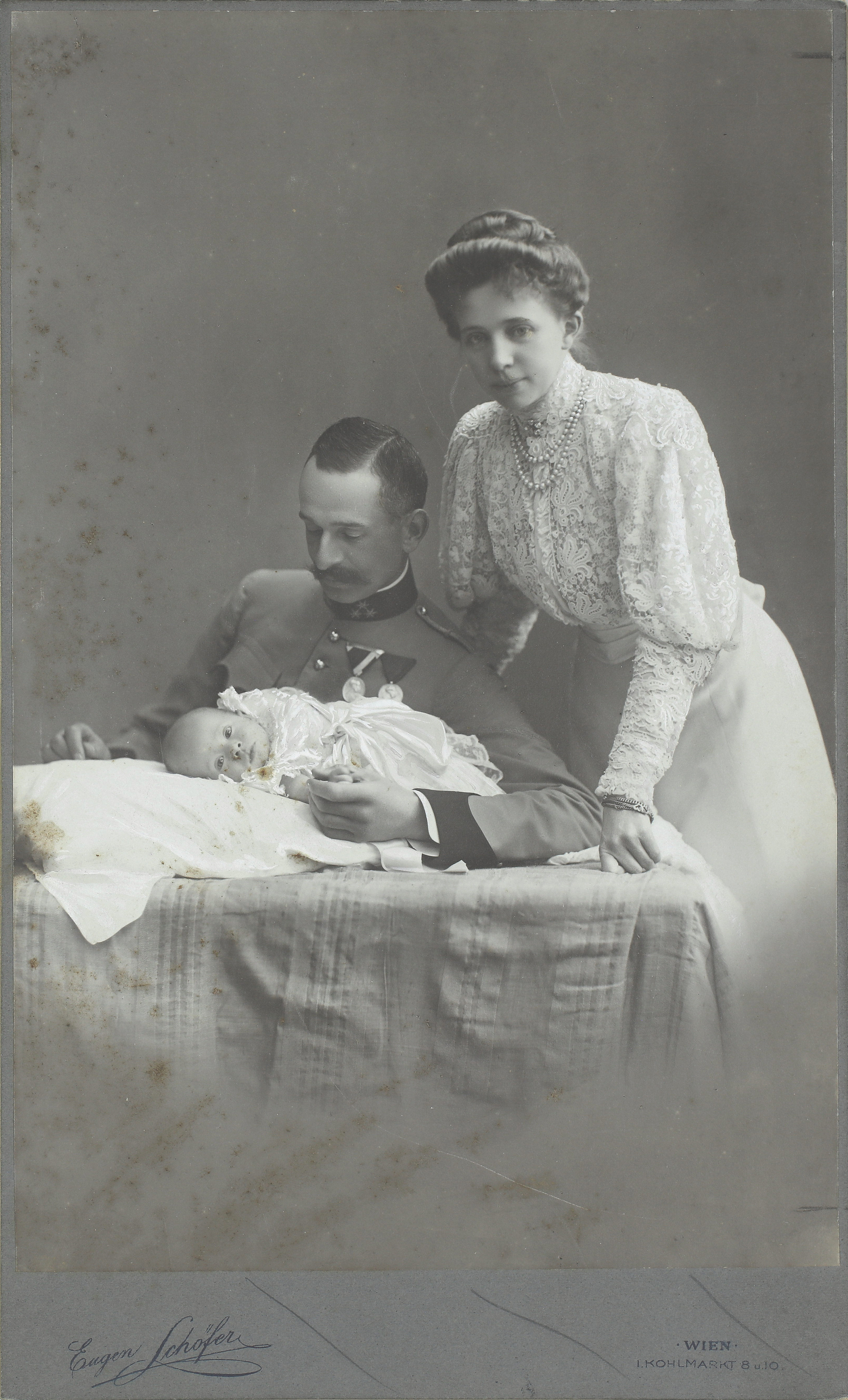
An infant Franz Joseph with his parents Prince Alois of Liechtenstein and Archduchess Elisabeth Amalie

Franz Joseph was born on 16 August 1906 in Schloss Frauenthal, Deutschlandsberg, Austria-Hungary as the first child of Prince Alois of Liechtenstein and Archduchess Elisabeth Amalie of Austria. He had 7 siblings throughout his lifetime. His god-parent was his great-uncle Franz Joseph I of Austria.

He spent most of his youth throughout various family-owned estates in Austria-Hungary (later Czechoslovakia), notably the Groß Ullersdorf castle in Moravia. He attended the Schottengymnasium in Vienna, where he graduated from in 1925 with a passion for mathematics, natural history and the Greek language. He then went on to study forestry at the University of Natural Resources and Life Sciences in Vienna, which he received a diploma on forestry engineering in 1930.

Franz Joseph was made heir presumptive of Prince of Liechtenstein on 26 February 1923 when his father renounced his right of succession in his favour as he was concerned about his age should he assume the role. On 17 April 1930 Franz Joseph was appointed to be the deputy of Franz I. In this role, he frequently travelled to the principality as a representative of him. He also visited several European countries during this time and the United States.

== Reign ==
=== Early reign ===
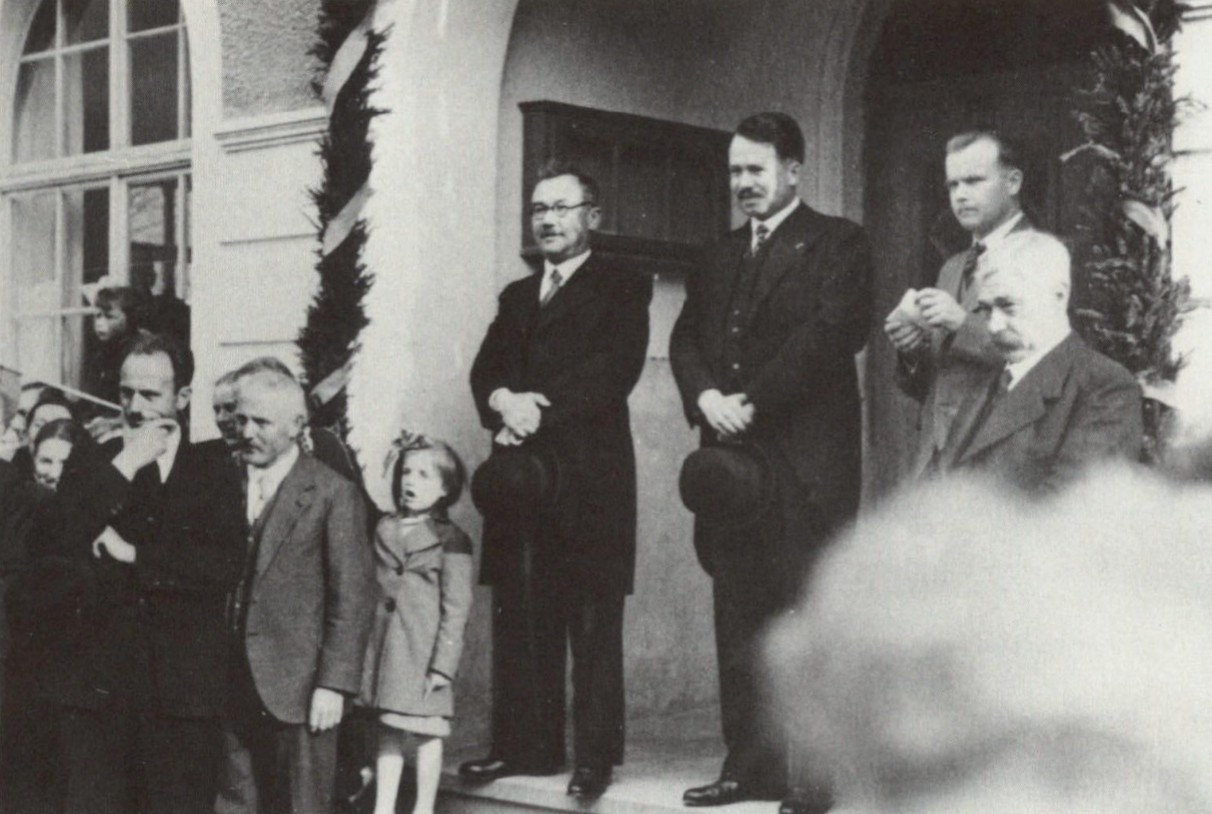
Franz Joseph with Josef Hoop and Alois Vogt in Balzers, 8 May 1938

On 31 March 1938, Franz I made Franz Joseph his regent following the Anschluss of Austria. Franz I then moved to Feldsberg (Valtice), Czechoslovakia, and on 25 July, he died while at one of his family's castles. Franz Joseph II formally succeeded him as the Prince of Liechtenstein.

Although officially Franz stated that he had given the regency to Franz Joseph due to his old age, it was speculated that he did not wish to remain in control of Liechtenstein if Nazi Germany were to invade, primarily because his wife, Elisabeth von Gutmann was of Jewish relation. Upon becoming Prince of Liechtenstein in 1938, Franz Joseph settled permanently in the principality, making him the first ruling prince to live there full-time.

=== World War II ===
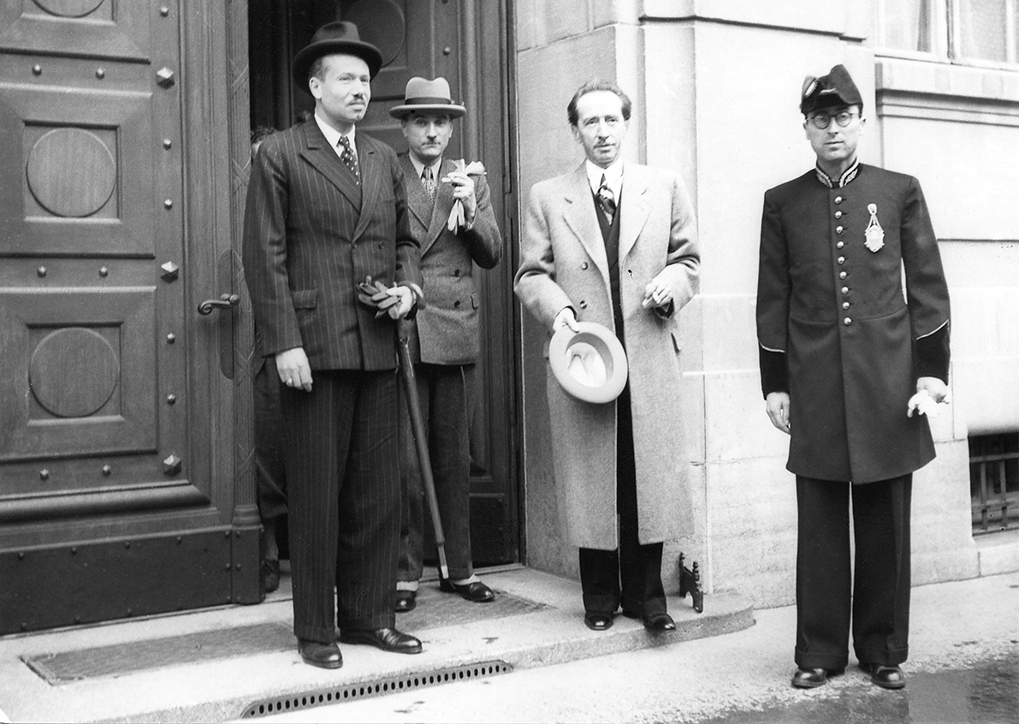
Franz Joseph (far left) with Marcel Pilet-Golaz and Enrico Celio in Bern, 1943

Liechtenstein remained neutral throughout World War II, and its neutrality was not violated by any of the combatants. Franz Joseph supported then Prime Minister of Liechtenstein Josef Hoop's policy of non-binding, non-provocative diplomacy towards Nazi Germany while personally tying the country as closely as possible to Switzerland during the war in hopes of retaining Liechtenstein's neutrality. He visited the Swiss Federal Council in April 1938 and again in 1943, along with to Victor Emmanuel III of Italy in November 1941.

Franz Joseph oversaw the formation of a coalition government between the Progressive Citizens' Party and the Patriotic Union that would prevent government deadlock and help retain Liechtenstein's neutrality.

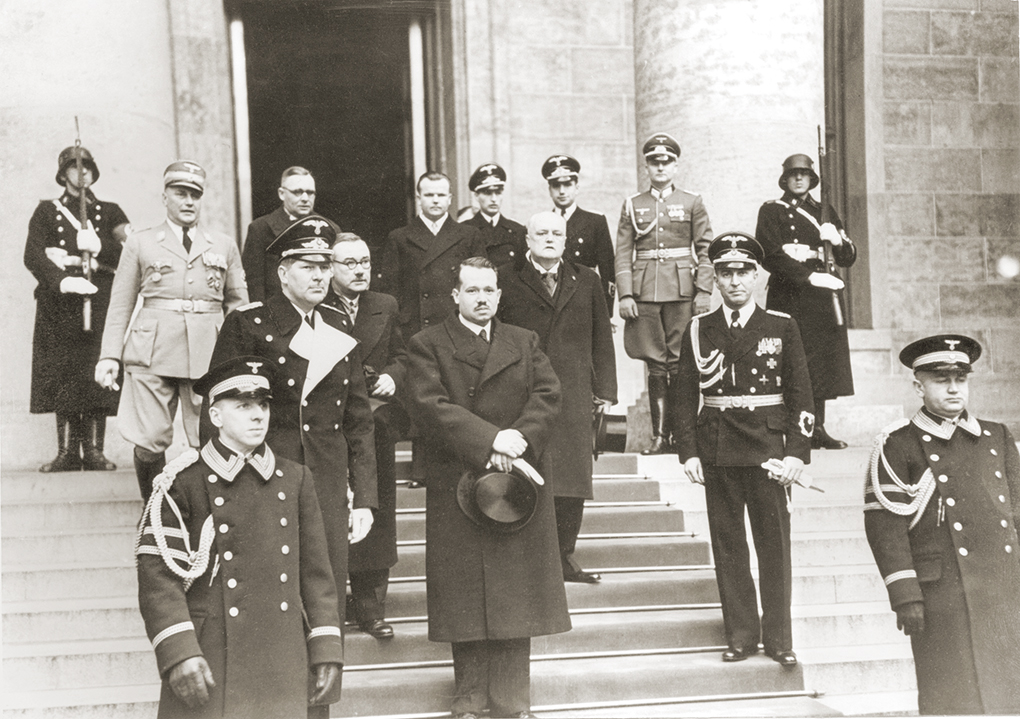
Franz Joseph (centre) outside the Reich Chancellery in Berlin, 2 March 1939

In March 1939 he along with Josef Hoop paid an official visit to Berlin where they met Adolf Hitler and Joachim von Ribbentrop and discussed safeguarding Liechtenstein's independence and neutrality while maintaining good relations. Franz Joseph later reminisced on the visit and stated that Hitler showed little interest in them and that it only took place in order to "flatter Hitler's ego".

While this visit was ongoing, the German National Movement in Liechtenstein (VBDL) staged an amateurish coup attempt, first trying to provoke an intervention from Nazi Germany by burning swastikas, followed by declaring an Anschluß with Germany. The leaders were almost immediately arrested and the German invasion they had hoped for failed to materialise. Despite this, the prince periodically sent congratulatory letters to Hitler throughout the war, such as after the thwarting of the 20 July plot, to which Hitler replied briefly.

During the war, Liechtenstein's princely family owned land in Austria whose managers hired Nazi forced labour, but a much later inquiry found the family not to have known about this. In 1945 all the family's estates in Czechoslovakia and Poland were expropriated without compensation by the Third Czechoslovak Republic and the Provisional Government of Poland.

Just before the end of the war, Franz Joseph granted political asylum to First Russian National Army pro-Axis pro-emperor Vladimir White emigres led by General Boris Smyslovsky, who were being cared for by the Liechtenstein Red Cross. On 16 August 1945, the Soviet Union sent a delegation to Liechtenstein in an attempt to repatriate the Russians, which was refused despite increasing Soviet pressure to participate in the repatriation program. Eventually the government of Argentina offered the Russians asylum, and about a hundred people moved there.

According to Alexander Frick, Prime Minister of Liechtenstein at the time, the Russians were at no point in danger of being extradited. Franz Joseph had explicitly given support for the asylum of the Russians. The general population of Liechtenstein supported the government in providing asylum to the Russians.

=== Later life ===
After losing roughly 80% of their property, Franz Joseph and his family sought to sell artworks from their collection in order to generate income, such as Leonardo da Vinci's Ginevra de' Benci in 1967 and Frans Hals's Willem van Heythuysen portrait that was sold to the Bavarian State Painting Collections in 1969.

Franz Joseph oversaw a family-owned bank which was run by the House of Liechtenstein with branches in London, Zürich, New York City and Frankfurt. This made the principality an ideal tax haven for wealthy individuals and private foreign companies, allowing Liechtenstein to experience rapid economic growth throughout his reign, transforming the principality into one of the richest countries in the world.

Franz Joseph played a role in maintaining Liechtenstein's diplomatic relations. He and Georgina von Wilczek hosted Prince Philip, Duke of Edinburgh, Charles III (then Prince of Wales) and Anne, Princess Royal in the Vaduz Castle on 29 December 1965 and again for Prince Philip and Elizabeth II in April 1980.

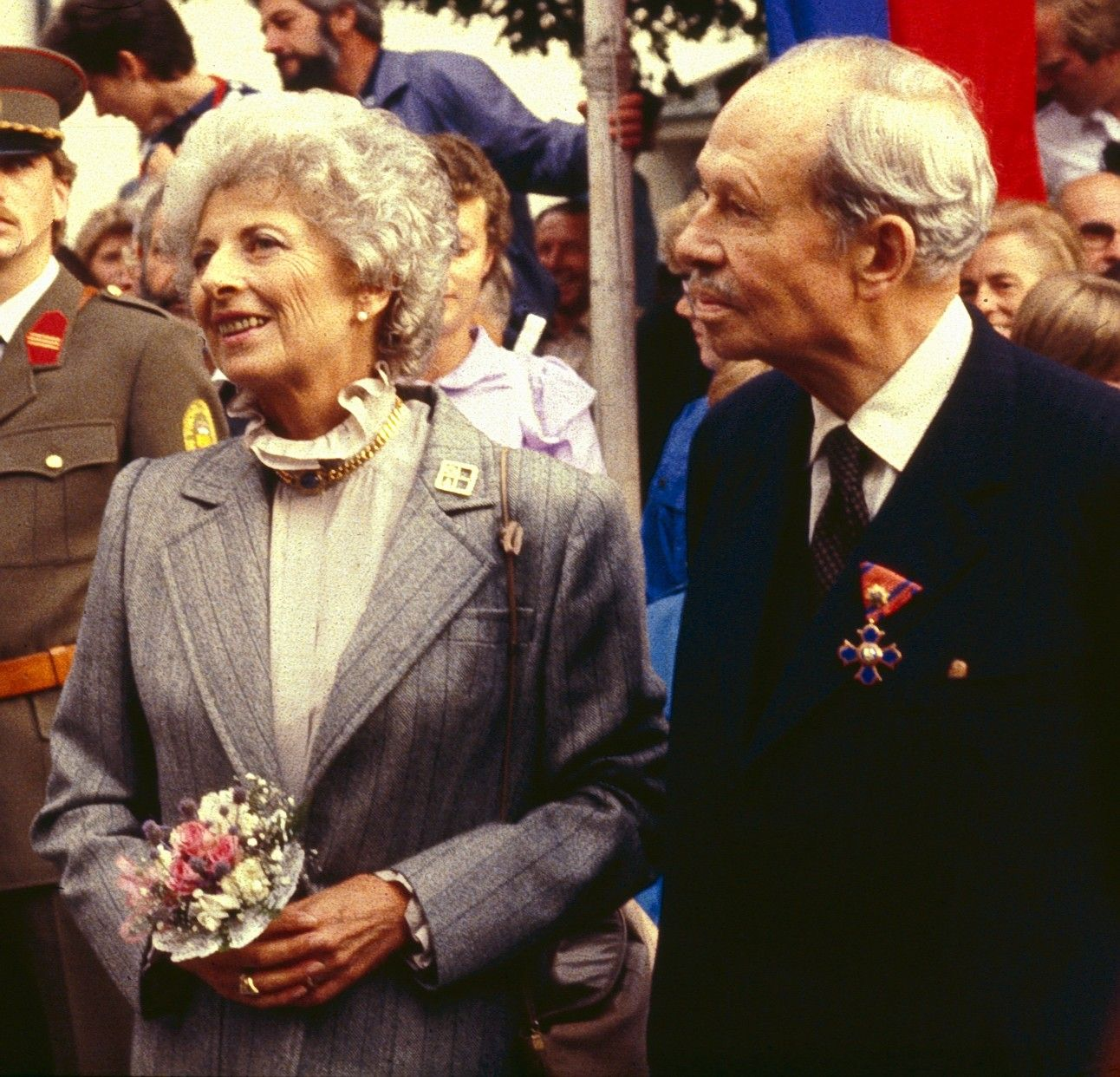
Franz Joseph and Countess Georgina von Wilczek, 1988

During his reign, women received voting rights for the first time, following a referendum on the topic (among men only) in 1984. That same year, he appointed Maria Foser as the first woman Deputy Government Councillor for Social Affairs. He exercised his veto power just once, in 1985, against a new hunting law that would have granted increased rights to hunters. He explained this by saying “It was a silly law. It would have turned every garden into a shooting ground".

Franz Joseph handed over most of day-to-day governmental decision making to his son, Hereditary Prince Hans-Adam, on 26 August 1984. He remained the legal head of state and sovereign prince of Liechtenstein. He died on 13 November 1989, 26 days after his wife, after having suffered from poor health. Ruling Liechtenstein for 51 years, he was among the longest-ruling sovereigns in Europe and the longest-serving national leader in the world at the time of his death. He was succeeded by his son, who became Hans-Adam II.

== Marriage and children ==
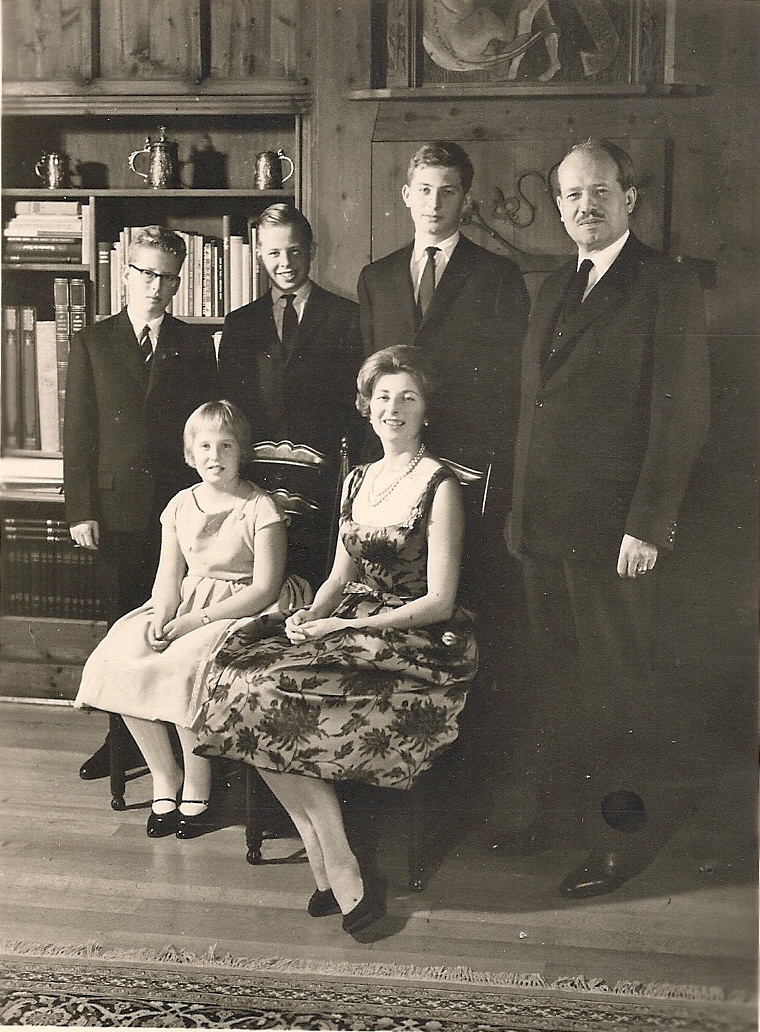
Franz Joseph and his family in 1955

On 7 March 1943, at St. Florin's in Vaduz, Franz Joseph II married Countess Georgina of Wilczek (24 October 1921 – 18 October 1989). It was the first time that the wedding of a ruling Prince had taken place in Liechtenstein. They had five children, twelve grandchildren and nineteen great-grandchildren:

- Hans-Adam II, Prince of Liechtenstein (14 February 1945, Zürich) he married Countess Marie Aglaë of Wchinitz and Tettau on 30 July 1967. They have four children and fifteen grandchildren.
- Prince Philipp of Liechtenstein (19 August 1946, Zürich) he married Isabelle de l'Arbre de Malander on 11 September 1971. They have three sons and four grandchildren.
- Prince Nikolaus of Liechtenstein (24 October 1947, Zürich) he married Princess Margaretha of Luxembourg on 20 March 1982. They have four children.
- Princess Norberta of Liechtenstein (31 October 1950, Zürich) she married Don Vicente Sartorius y Cabeza de Vaca, 3rd Marqués de Mariño on 11 June 1988. They had one daughter.
- Prince Franz Josef Wenceslaus of Liechtenstein (Zürich, 19 November 1962 – Vaduz, 28 February 1991). Died unmarried and without issue at the age of 28.

== Honours ==
- Austria
  - (Austria-Hungary) Austrian Imperial and Royal family: Knight with Collar of the Order of the Golden Fleece
  - Austria: Grand Cross of the Decoration of Honour for Services to the Republic of Austria, Grand Star
- (Greece) Greek Royal Family: Knight Grand Cross of the Royal Order of the Redeemer
- (Iran) Iranian Imperial Family: Recipient of the Commemorative Medal of the 2,500-year Celebration of the Persian Empire
- Vatican: Knight Grand Cross with Collar of the Order of the Holy Sepulchre
  - Holy See: Knight Grand Cross with Collar of the Order of Pope Pius IX

== See also ==
- Princely Family of Liechtenstein

== Notes ==
Franz Joseph II of Liechtenstein House of Liechtenstein Born: 16 August 1906 Died: 13 November 1989
Regnal titles
Preceded by Franz I	Prince of Liechtenstein; 1938–1989	Succeeded by Hans-Adam II
