= Gina, Princess of Liechtenstein =

Princess of Liechtenstein from 1943 to 1989

Gina
- Duchess of Troppau and Jägerndorf; Countess of Rietberg
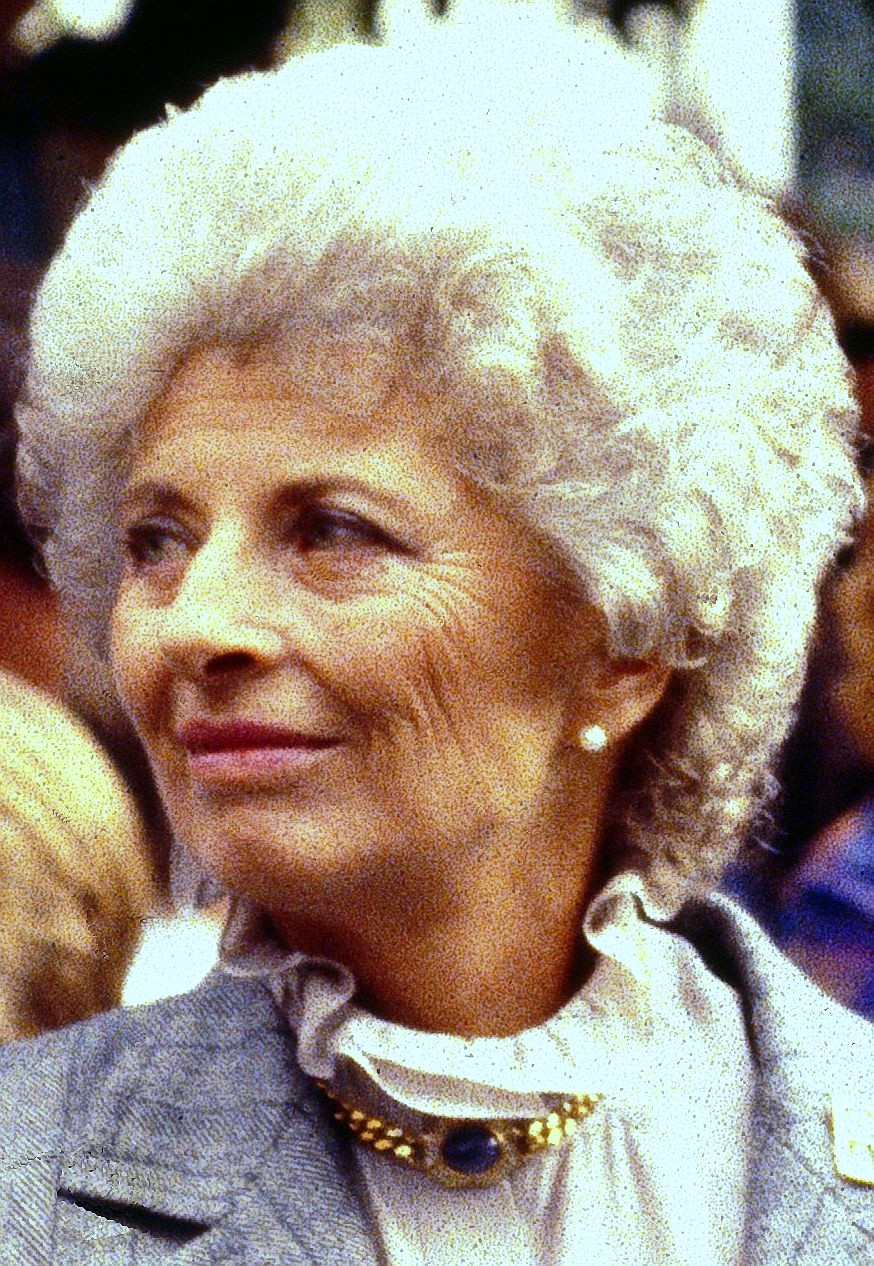
- Princess Gina in August 1988

Princess consort of Liechtenstein
- Tenure: 7 March 1943 – 18 October 1989
- Born: Countess Georgina Norberta Jane Marie Antonie Raphaela von Wilczek; 24 October 1921; Graz, Styria, Austria
- Died: 18 October 1989 (aged 67); Grabs, St. Gallen, Switzerland
- Burial: Cathedral of St. Florin, Vaduz, Liechtenstein
- Spouse: Franz Joseph II, Prince of Liechtenstein (m. 1943)
- Issue: Hans-Adam II, Prince of Liechtenstein; Prince Philipp; Prince Nikolaus; Princess Nora, Dowager Marchioness of Mariño; Prince Franz Josef
- Father: Count Ferdinand von Wilczek
- Mother: Countess Norbertine Kinsky von Wchinitz und Tettau
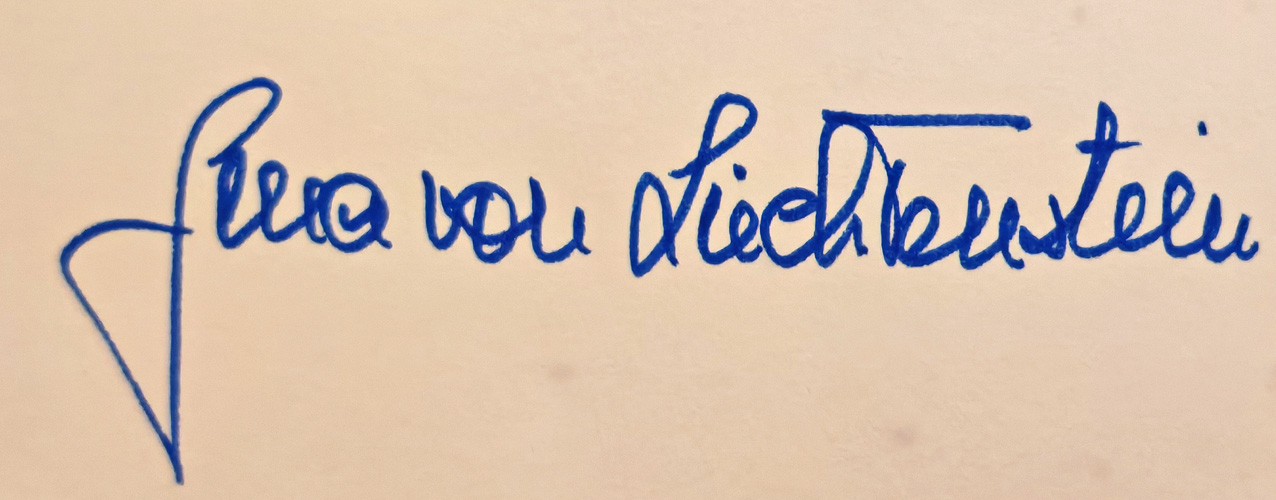
- Signature

Georgina Norberta Jane Marie Antonie Raphaela von Wilczek (24 October 1921 – 18 October 1989), widely known as Gina, was Princess of Liechtenstein from 1943 until her death in 1989 as the wife of Prince Franz Joseph II. She was the mother of Prince Hans-Adam II.

== Early life ==
Georgina was born on 24 October 1921, in Graz, Austria. She was the daughter of Count Ferdinand von Wilczek (1893–1977) and his wife, Countess Norbertine "Nora" Kinsky von Wchinitz und Tettau (1888–1923). In 1923, when Georgina was just two years old, her mother died after giving birth to a stillborn child.

Georgina received her formal education in the Sacré-Cœur grammar school and a boarding school run by the Congregation of Jesus in Rome. She then studied languages at the University of Vienna and graduated as an interpreter in English, French and Italian.

== Marriage and family ==
Georgina probably met her future husband, Franz Joseph II, in early 1942. A fourth cousin, he had reigned as Prince of Liechtenstein since 1938 and was fifteen years her senior. Their friendship eventually turned to love, with their engagement being announced on 30 December 1942. They were married on 7 March 1943 at the Cathedral of St. Florin in Vaduz. It was the first time that the wedding of a ruling Prince had taken place in Liechtenstein. During the following weeks, the newly-weds visited all eleven communes of Liechtenstein.

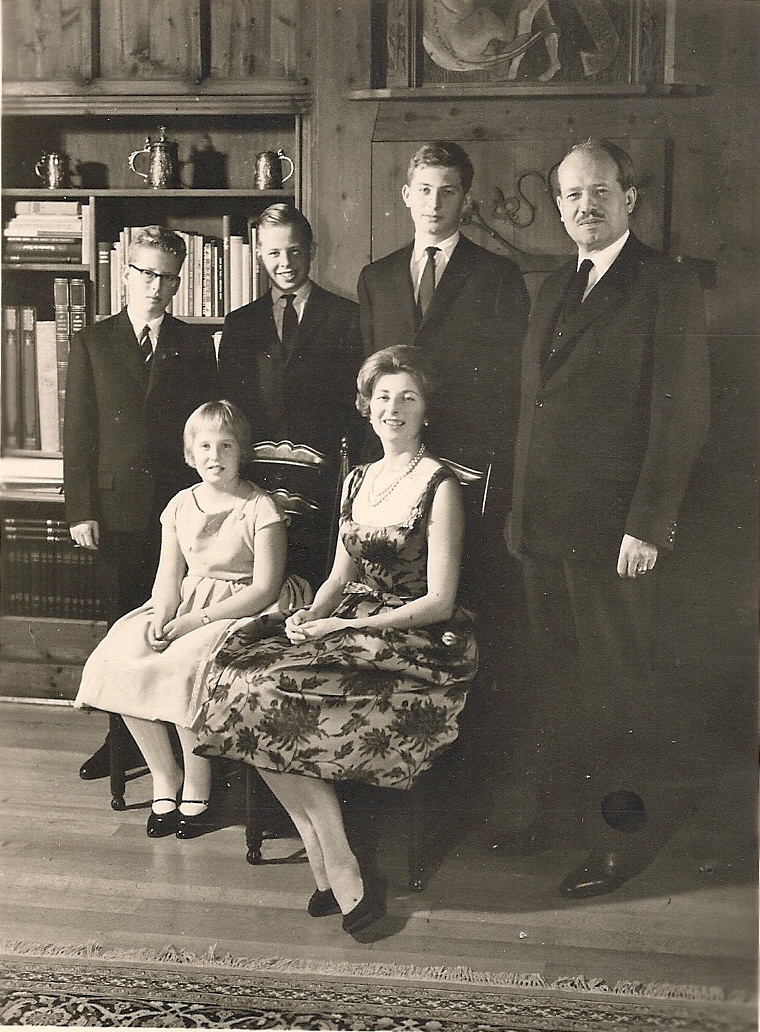
Princess Gina with her family in 1955.

The couple had five children:

- Hans-Adam II, Prince of Liechtenstein (born 1945). Married Countess Marie Kinsky of Wchinitz and Tettau and has issue.
- Prince Philipp of Liechtenstein (born 1946). Married Isabelle de l'Arbre de Malander (b. 1949) and has issue.
- Prince Nikolaus of Liechtenstein (born 1947). Married Princess Margaretha of Luxembourg (b. 1957), daughter of Grand Duke Jean, and has issue.
- Princess Norberta of Liechtenstein (born 1950), popularly known as Princess Nora. Married Vicente Sartorius y Cabeza de Vaca, 3rd Marquis of Mariño, and has issue.
- Prince Franz Josef of Liechtenstein (1962–1991), popularly known as Prince Wenzel.

Two of her descendants were named after her: her great-granddaughters Princess Georgina Maximiliana Tatiana Maria of Liechtenstein (b. 2005, daughter of Prince Constantin) and Althaea Georgina Worthington (b. 2022, granddaughter of Prince Nikolaus through his second daughter Princess Marie-Astrid).

== Princess of Liechtenstein ==
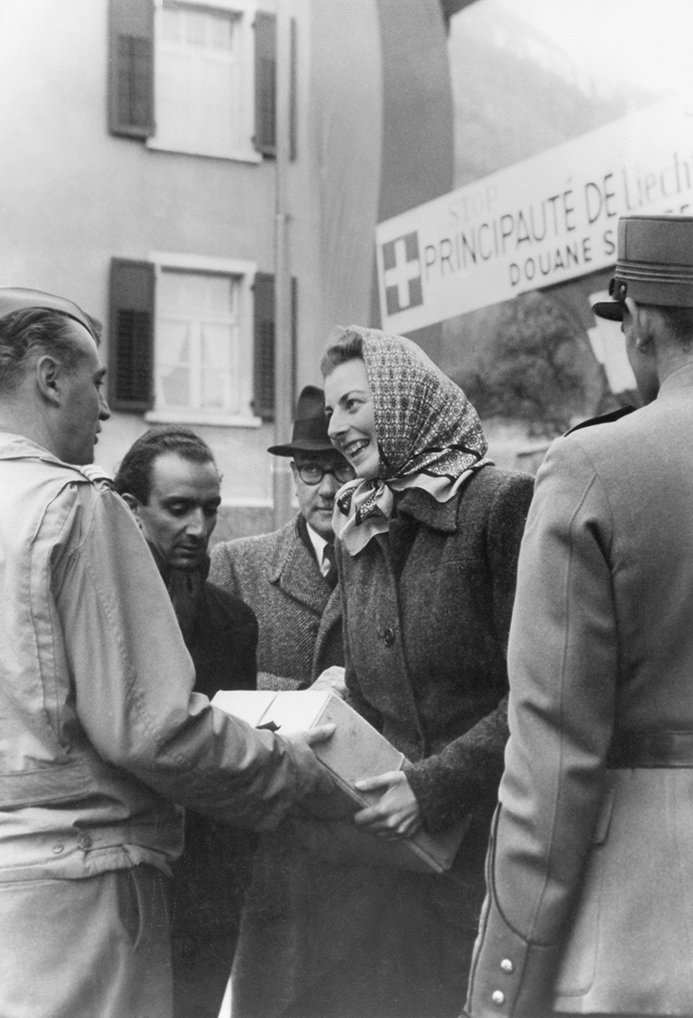
Princess Gina with Josef Hoop in French-occupied Feldkirch presenting gifts for the wounded to the French city commander, 1945

During World War II, Princess Gina had concerns regarding prisoners of war and those travelling by bicycle when the country suffered a gasoline shortage. When the war ended in 1945, Princess Gina helped the refugees by making soup and bathing children on the national border at Schaanwald. On 22 June 1945, at her initiative, the Liechtenstein Red Cross was founded, and she was president from 1945 to 1985 and became honorary president in 1985. The following year, she founded a counseling center for mothers in Liechtenstein. In 1948, the Liechtenstein Red Cross's family welfare organization was founded. In 1956, Princess Gina opened the Red Cross's first children's home in Triesen. In 1972, the Red Cross's rescue service was established.

She supported Vereine für Familienhilfe since 1956. She was also a president of Verband Liechtensteinischer Familienhilfen, a family support organisation, from 1966 to 1977 and a patron from 1977 to 1989. In 1989, she became honorary president of the International Council of Homehelp-Service. She became president of Association for Curative Education in Liechtenstein (German: Verein für Heilpädagogische Hilfe) from 1967 to 1983. Under her leadership, a school for disabled children and a protective workshops were founded in 1969 and 1975 respectively. She also founded the Liechtenstein Foundation for Old Age (German: Liechtenstein Stiftung für das Alter) in 1971 where she became the president of the board of trustees. She became the head of the Martin Tietz Foundation. In 1966, Association of Liechtenstein Female Farmers was founded on the initiative of Princess Gina with the support of the Liechtenstein Farmers' Association and she was appointed as an honorary president. She was the patron of the Liechtenstein Girl Scouts and often attended their events.

Beside from her numerous charitable and social activities, Princess Gina was also committed to a number of political issues including the introduction of women's suffrage in Liechtenstein. In 1987, the Princess was awarded the Henry Dunant Medal by the International Committee of the Red Cross. Princess Gina was very popular with the public for her social commitment to families, the disabled, the elderly and refugees, being a caring mother, as well as her warm and open personality.

== Death and legacy ==
Princess Gina died on 18 October 1989, in the Cantonal Hospital in Grabs, Switzerland, aged 67, shortly after receiving her last sacraments. She had been hospitalized for an undisclosed illness leading up to her death. Her husband, who was also in poor health, collapsed at her bed and died 26 days later. They are interred together in Vaduz Cathedral.

Princess Gina Trail was named in her honour. Fürst Franz und Fürstin Gina Pfadfinder was founded in honour of Prince Franz Josef II and Princess Gina.

== Titles, styles and honours ==
=== Titles and styles ===
- 24 October 1921 – 7 March 1943: Hochgeborene Countess Georgina von Wilczek
- 7 March 1943 – 18 October 1989: Her Serene Highness The Princess of Liechtenstein

=== Honours ===
==== National honours ====
- Liechtenstein: Knight Grand Cross of the Order of Merit of the Principality of Liechtenstein, Grand Star
- Liechtenstein: Recipient of the 50th Birthday Medal of Prince Franz Joseph II
- Liechtenstein: Recipient of the 70th Birthday Medal of Prince Franz Joseph II

==== Foreign honours ====
- (Austria-Hungary) Austrian Imperial and Royal Family: Dame of the Order of the Starry Cross, 1st Class
- (Kingdom of Greece) Greek Royal Family: Dame Grand Cross of the Royal Order of Saints Olga and Sophia
- (Kingdom of Greece) Greek Royal Family: Dame Grand Cross of the Royal Order of Beneficence
- Holy See: Dame Grand Cross of the Order of the Holy Sepulchre
- Holy See: Recipient of the Pro Ecclesia et Pontifice
- (Iran) Iranian Imperial Family: Recipient of the Commemorative Medal of the 2,500-year Celebration of the Persian Empire

== Ancestry ==
Ancestors of Gina, Princess of Liechtenstein

8. Count Johann Nepomuk von Wilczek
4. Count Johann Nepomuk von Wilczek
9. Countess Emma Maria Emo Capodilista
2. Count Ferdinand Maria von Wilczek
10. Ferdinand Bonaventura, 7th Prince Kinsky of Wchinitz and Tettau
5. Countess Elisabeth Wilhelmine Kinsky von Wchinitz und Tettau
11. Princess Maria Josepha of Liechtenstein
1. Countess Georgina von Wilczek
12. Count Johann Baptist Kinsky von Wchinitz und Tettau
6. Count Oktavian Zdenko Kinsky von Wchinitz und Tettau
13. Iphigénia Terézia Dadányi de Gyülvész
3. Countess Norbertine Kinsky von Wchinitz und Tettau
14. Count György László Festetics de Tólna
7. Countess Georgine Ernestine Festétics de Tólna
15. Countess Eugénia Barbara Erdödy de Monyorókerék et Monoszló

Gina, Princess of Liechtenstein Wilczek Family Born: 24 October 1921 Died: 18 October 1989
Liechtensteiner royalty
Preceded by Elisabeth von Gutmann	Princess consort of Liechtenstein; 1943–1989	Succeeded by Countess Marie Kinsky of Wchinitz and Tettau
