= Maria Foser =

Liechtensteiner politician

Deputy Government Councillor for Social Affairs
- In office 1984–1993
- Monarchs: Franz Joseph II (1984–1989); Hans Adam II (1989–1993)

Personal details
- Occupation: politician

Maria Foser-Beck is a Liechtensteiner politician. She was the first woman to serve as Deputy Government Councillor for Social Affairs.

== Biography ==
In 1984, Prince Franz Joseph II appointed Foser-Beck as Deputy Government Councillor for Social Affairs of Liechtenstein (Regierungsrat-Stellvertreterin), the same year that Liechtensteiner women obtained the right to vote. She was the first woman to hold this office. Foser served as Deputy Councillor from 1984 to 1993.

Foser-Beck lives in Triesenberg and is a member of the Liechtenstein Samaritan Association.
