= Elisabeth Tichy-Fisslberger =

Austrian lawyer and diplomat

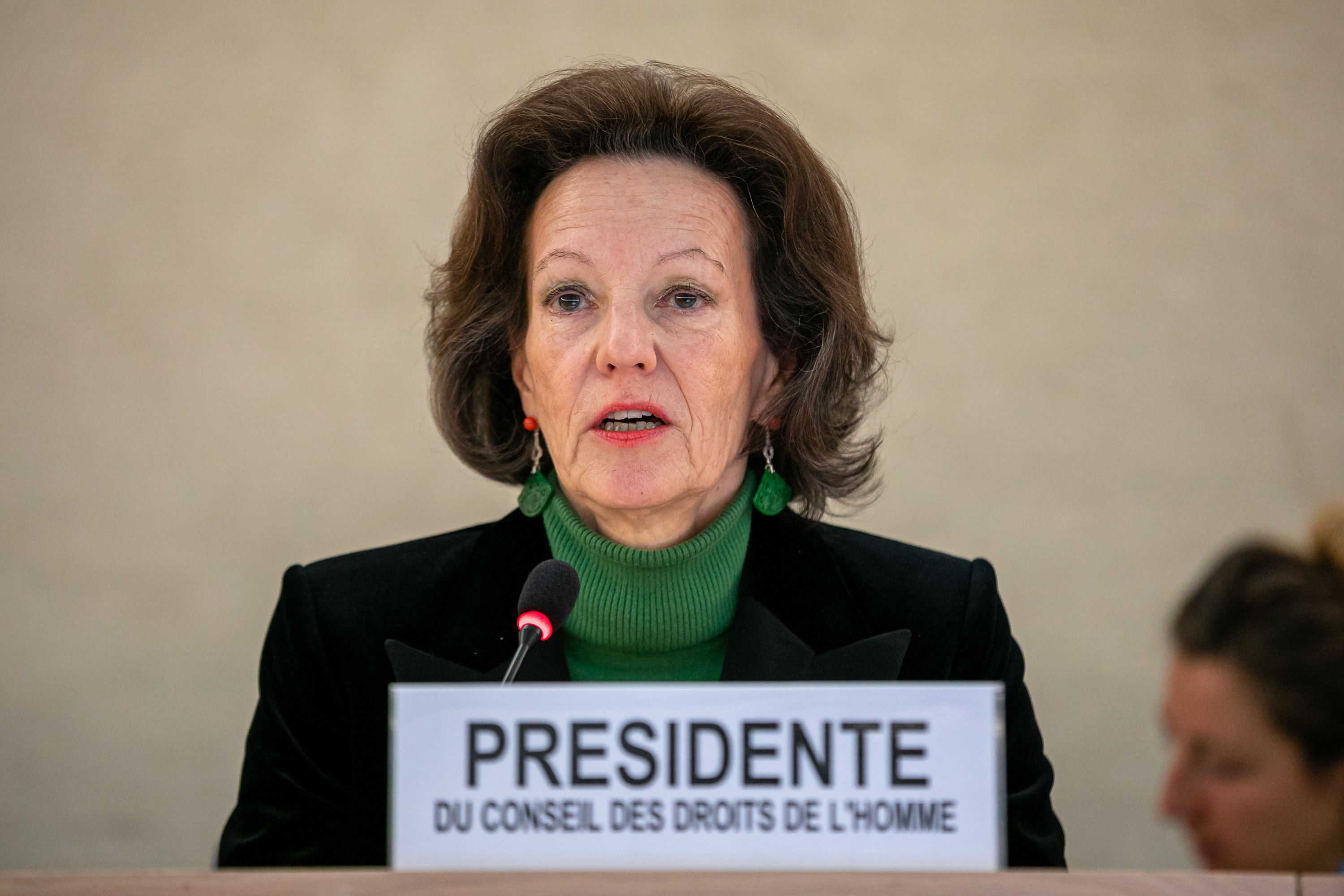
- Tichy-Fisslberger in 2020

President of the United Nations Human Rights Council
- In office 1 January 2020 – 31 December 2020
- Preceded by: Coly Seck
- Succeeded by: Nazhat Shameem

Personal details
- Born: 1957 (age 68–69) Vienna

Elisabeth Tichy-Fisslberger, or Elisabeth Fisslberger, (born 1957) is an Austrian lawyer, translator and diplomat who was the first Austrian to serve as president of the United Nations Human Rights Council for 2020.

== Early life and education ==
Tichy-Fisslberger was born in Vienna in 1957. She studied law at the University of Vienna whilst also studying French and Spanish translation. She gained a scholarship to study in Belgium at the Université catholique de Louvain.

== Career ==
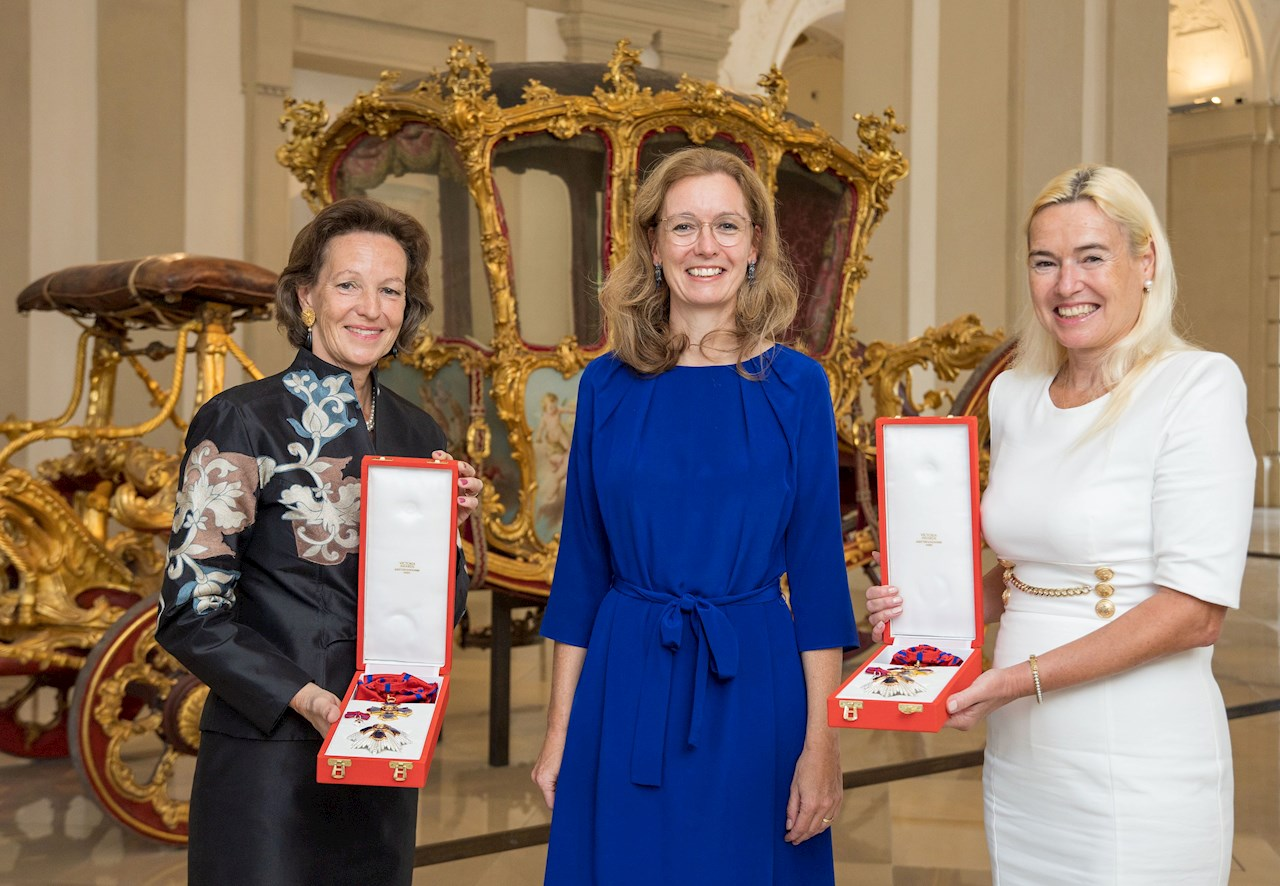
Tichy-Fisslberger (left) receiving the Order of Merit of the Principality of Liechtenstein alongside Petra Schneebauer by Sabine Monauni in September 2021

Tichy-Fisslberger was elected chair of the United Nations Human Rights Council in December 2019 to serve in 2020. The Austrian Minister of Foreign Affairs, Alexander Schallenberg, noted that her appointment was a recognition of her country's human rights efforts. She was the first Austrian to hold this position in the United Nations. She took over the position from Coly Seck of Senegal who had held the position in 2019. Her vice-presidents were Ambassadors Nasir Ahmad Andisha of Afghanistan, Togo's Yackoley Kokou Johnson, Mexico's Socorro Flores Liera and Slovakia's Juraj Podhorsky.

== Other activities ==
- International Gender Champions (IGC), Member

== Honours ==
- Liechtenstein: Grand Cross of the Order of Merit of the Principality of Liechtenstein (2021)
