= Vaduz Cathedral =

Neo-Gothic church in Vaduz, Liechtenstein

Coordinates: 47.1362°N 9.5227°E

Vaduz Cathedral Kathedrale St. Florin in Vaduz
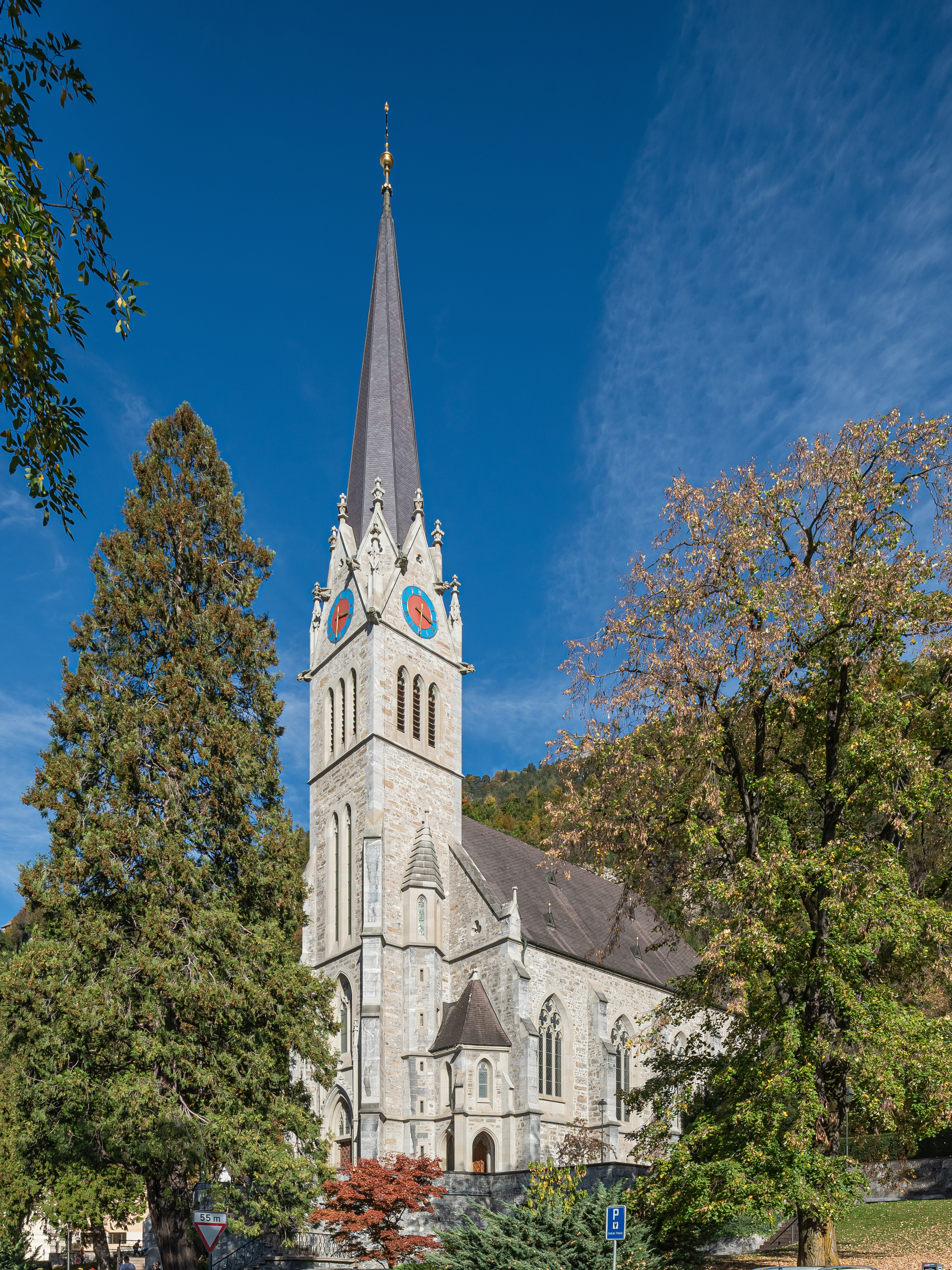

Religion
- Affiliation: Catholic Church
- Rite: Roman Rite
- Ecclesiastical or organisational status: Cathedral
- Leadership: Archbishop Wolfgang Haas
- Patron: Florinus of Remüs
- Year consecrated: 1873

Location
- Location: Vaduz
- Interactive map of Vaduz Cathedral; Kathedrale St. Florin in Vaduz

Architecture
- Architect: Friedrich von Schmidt
- Type: church
- Style: Gothic Revival
- Groundbreaking: 1869
- Completed: 1874
- Direction of façade: West

Website
- www.erzbistum-vaduz.li

Vaduz Cathedral, or Cathedral of St. Florin (German: St. Florinskirche in Vaduz or Kathedrale St. Florin), is a neo-Gothic church in Vaduz, Liechtenstein, and the centre of the Archdiocese of Vaduz. Originally a parish church, it was elevated to the status of cathedral in 1997, and has held that designation since.

== History ==
It was built in 1874 by Friedrich von Schmidt on the site of earlier medieval foundations. Its patron saint is Florinus of Remüs (Florin), a 9th-century saint of the Vinschgau Valley.

The Archdiocese of Vaduz was erected by Pope John Paul II on 2 December 1997. Before then it had been the Liechtenstein Deanery, a part of the Swiss Diocese of Chur. The solemn public ceremony took place on December 12, 1997, in the parish church of Vaduz, which was then raised to the dignity of a cathedral.

The Cathedral is the venue for national and royal family ceremonies. In August 2025, Princess Marie Caroline, grand-daughter of Prince Hans Adam, was married at the Cathedral.

== Gallery ==
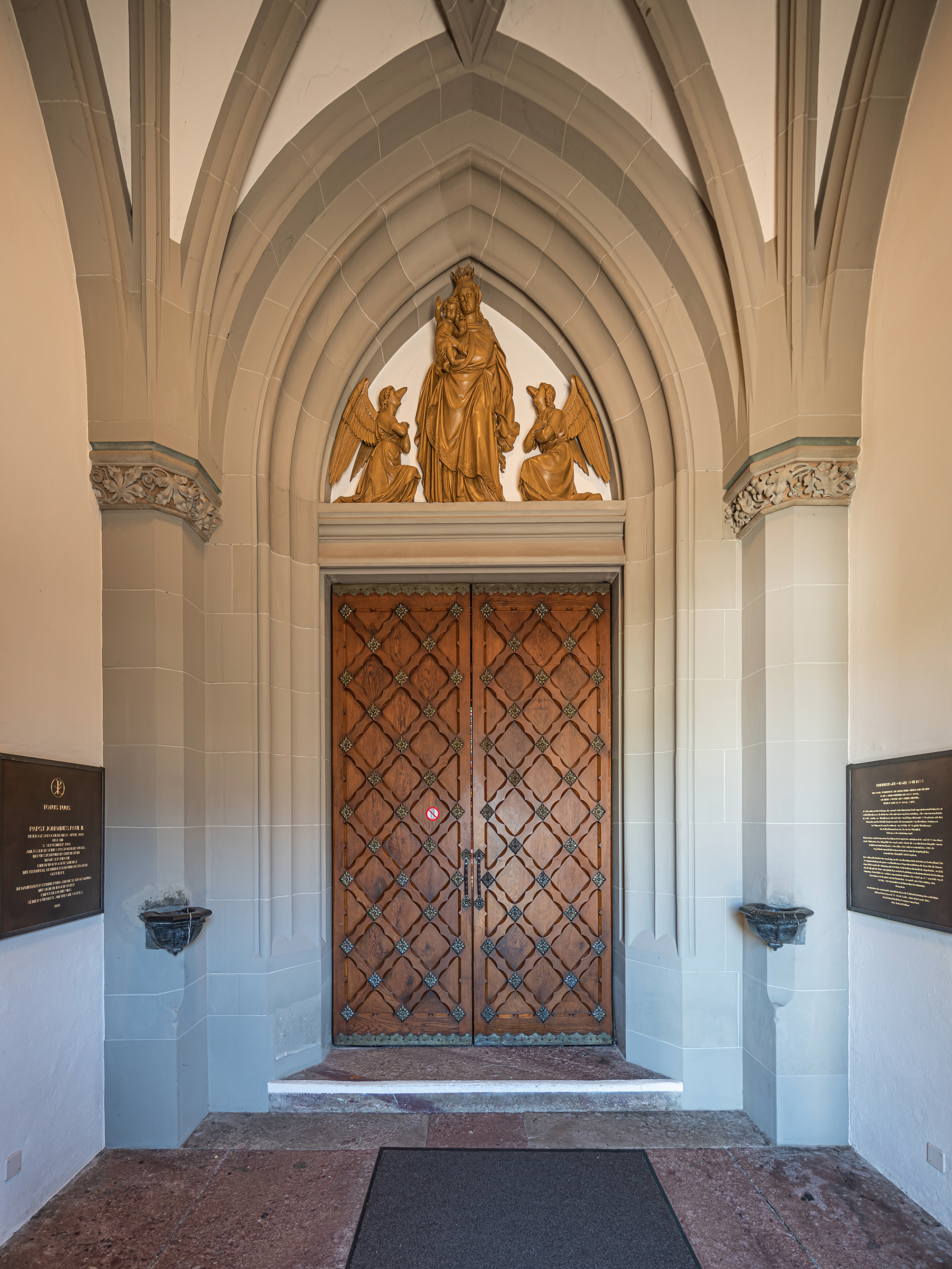
Church portal

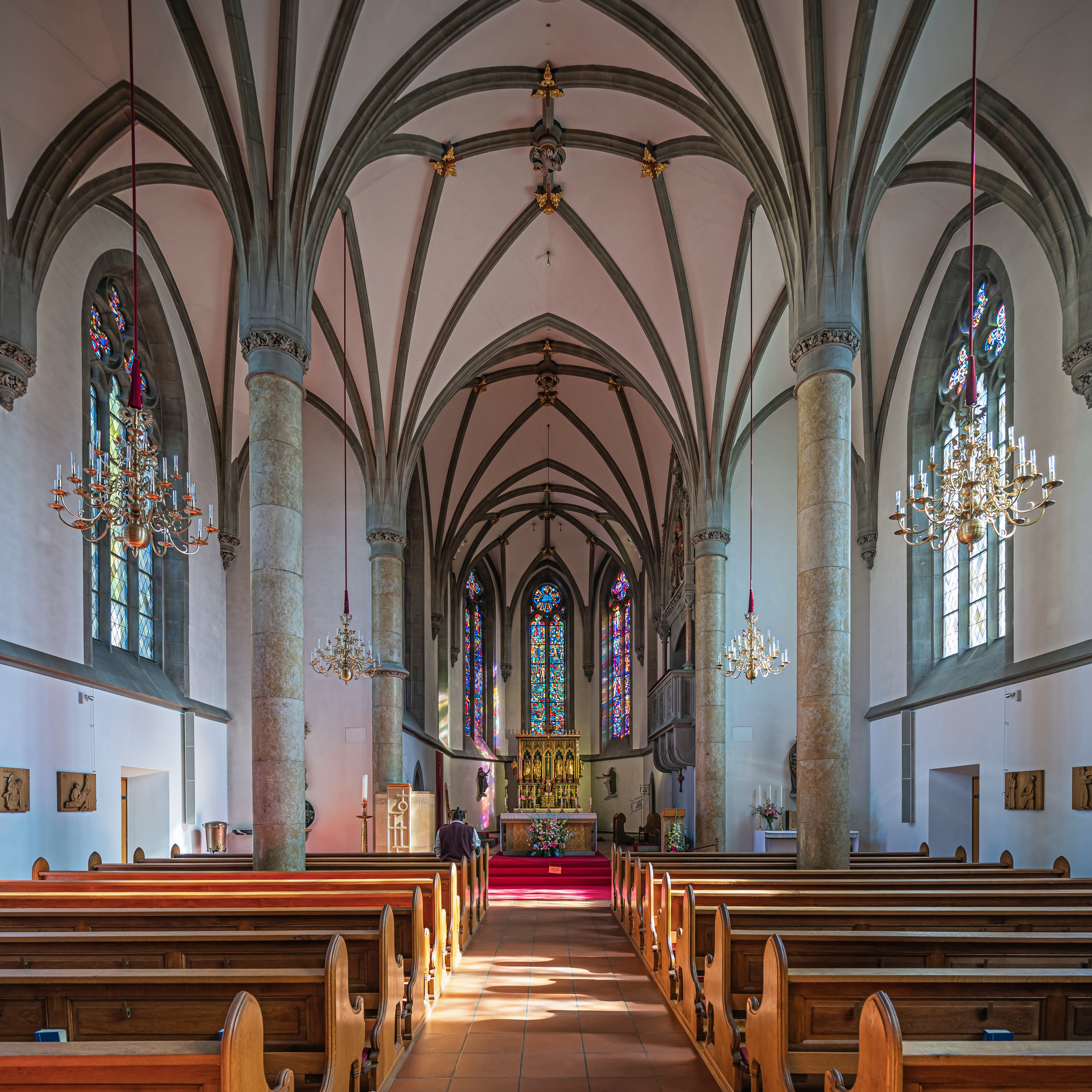
The nave and choir of the Vaduz Cathedral

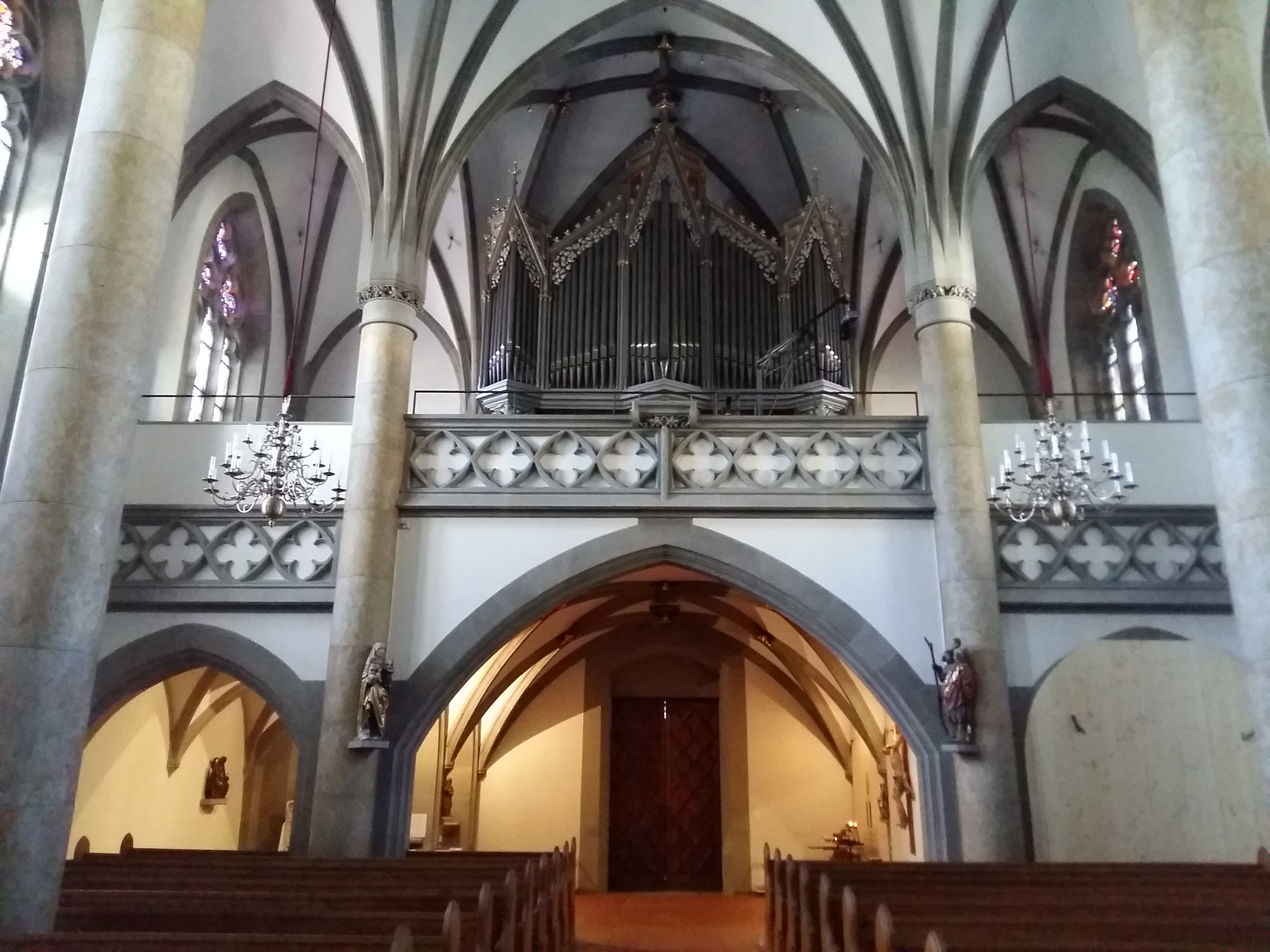
Portals and pipe organ

== Princely Crypt ==
The Princely Crypt of the House of Liechtenstein is located directly next to Vaduz Cathedral. It is open to the public on All Saints Day (1 November) each year.

=== Burials (selection) ===
Members of the House of Liechtenstein buried in the Princely Crypt include:

- Prince Franz Joseph II of Liechtenstein (1989)
- Princess Georgina of Liechtenstein (1989)
- Prince Franz Josef "Wenzel" of Liechtenstein (1991)
- Princess Marie of Liechtenstein (2021)
- Princess Elisabeth of Liechtenstein
- Prince Karl Aloys of Liechtenstein
- Princess Elisabeth of Liechtenstein
- Prince Alois of Liechtenstein (1869–1955)
- Archduchess Elisabeth Amalie of Austria
- Archduchess Maria Annunciata of Austria
- Prince Johannes of Liechtenstein
- Prince Ferdinand of Liechtenstein
- Prince Heinrich Hartneid of Liechtenstein
- Prince Constantin of Liechtenstein
- Prince Vincenz of Liechtenstein
- Prince Constantin of Liechtenstein (2023)

== See also ==
- Roman Catholicism in Liechtenstein
