= Hausleiten =

- Municipality
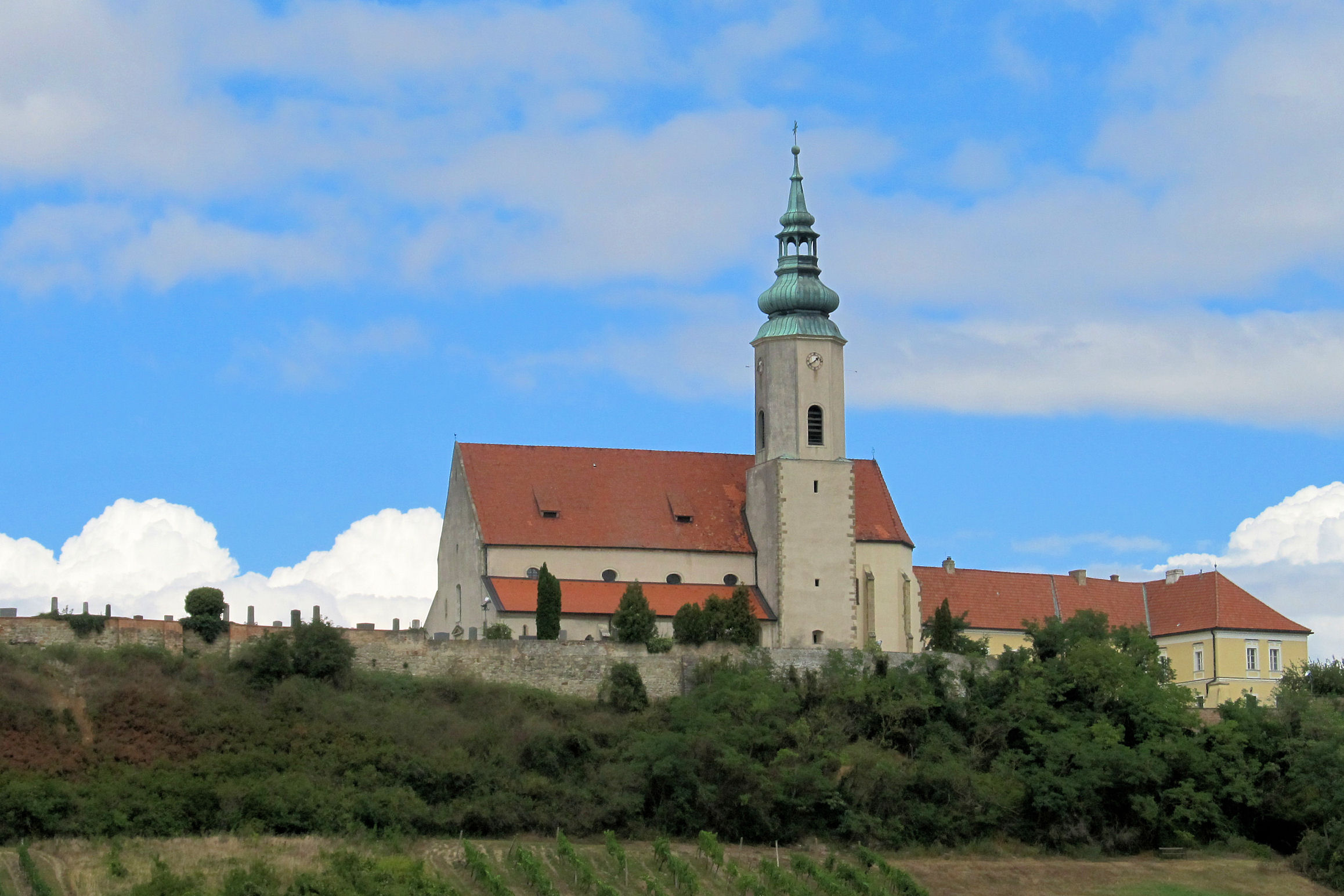
- Hausleiten parish church

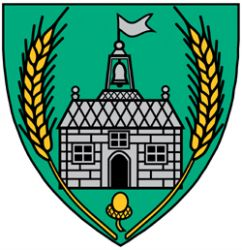
- Coat of arms

- Location within Austria
- Coordinates: 48°24′N 16°6′E
- Country: Austria
- State: Lower Austria
- District: Korneuburg

Government
  - Mayor: Otto Ruthner

Area
  - Total: 61.04 km^{2} (23.57 sq mi)
- Elevation: 207 m (679 ft)

Population (2018-01-01)
  - Total: 3,784
  - Density: 61.99/km^{2} (160.6/sq mi)
- Time zone: UTC+1 (CET)
  - Summer (DST): UTC+2 (CEST)
- Postal code: 3464
- Area code: 02265
- Website: www.hausleiten.gv.at

Hausleiten is a town in the district of Korneuburg in Lower Austria in Austria.

== Geography ==
It lies in the Weinviertel in Lower Austria. About 14.26 percent of the municipality is forested.
