= Goldgeben =

- Village
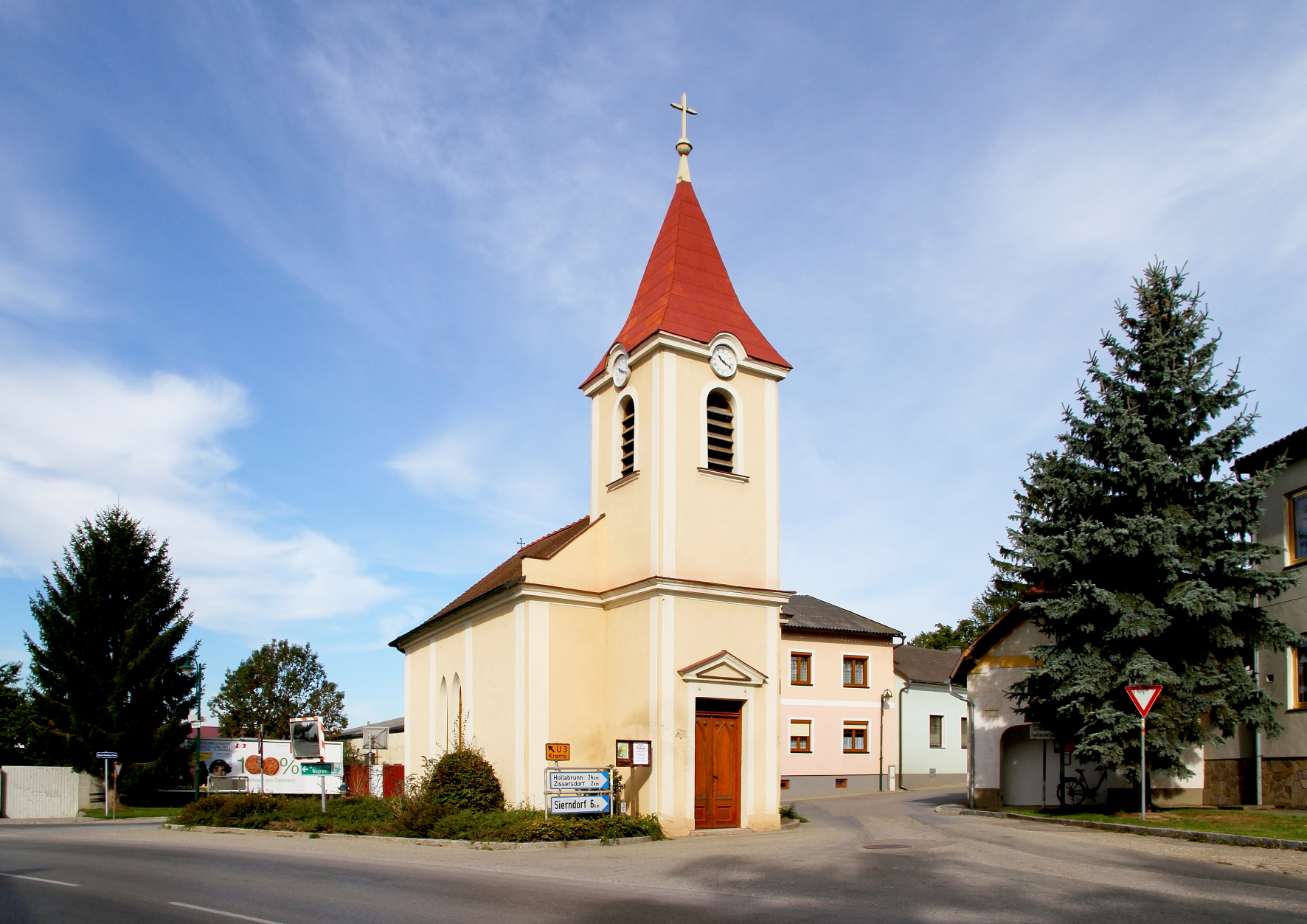
- Goldgeben chapel in 2011

- Location within Austria
- Coordinates: 48°23′37″N 16°06′57″E
- Country: Austria
- State: Lower Austria
- District: Korneuburg
- Municipality: Hausleiten
- Time zone: UTC+1 (CET)
  - Summer (DST): UTC+2 (CEST)

Goldgeben is a village with 546 inhabitants in the Korneuburg District in Lower Austria. It was incorporated on 1 January 1972. as a cadastral municipality Marktleiinde Hausleiten.

The village was first mentioned in the first third of the 12th-century. Its name refers to gold deposits in ancient times, long before the Danube regulation, when the shores and islands of the branched arms of the Danube River were populated by gold miners. For the production of gold, felt wipes were used to catch dust in the fibers.

The family of Leopoldus de Goldgeben took its name after the village around the years 1120–30.

Originally, the Bishop of Passau was the owner of the land. From 1582 Goldgeben was subject to Count Hardegg in Stetteldorf. The village chapel, built of wood in 1841, was rebuilt with bricks in 1855.
