= Hans-Adam II of Liechtenstein =

Prince of Liechtenstein since 1989

Hans-Adam II
- Duke of Troppau and Jägerndorf; Count of Rietberg
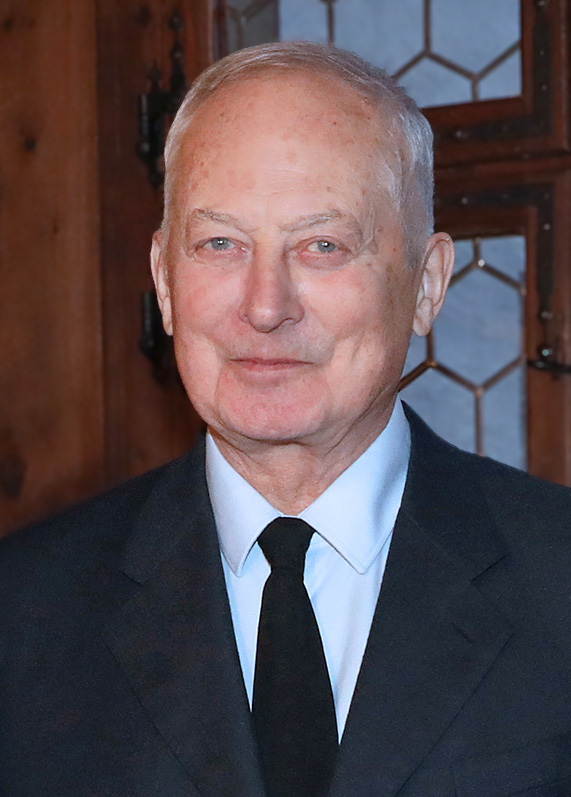
- Hans-Adam in 2025

Prince of Liechtenstein
- Reign: 13 November 1989 – present
- Predecessor: Franz Joseph II
- Heir apparent: Alois
- Regent: Alois (2004–present)

Regent of Liechtenstein
- Regency: 26 August 1984 – 13 November 1989
- Monarch: Franz Joseph II
- Prime Ministers: See list: Hans Brunhart
- Born: 14 February 1945 (age 81); Zürich, Switzerland
- Spouse: Countess Marie Kinsky of Wchinitz and Tettau (m. 1967; died 2021)
- Issue: Alois, Hereditary Prince of Liechtenstein; Prince Maximilian; Prince Constantin; Princess Tatjana
Names
- Johannes Adam Ferdinand Alois Josef Maria Marco d'Aviano Pius
- House: Liechtenstein
- Father: Franz Joseph II, Prince of Liechtenstein
- Mother: Countess Georgina von Wilczek
- Religion: Roman Catholic

Hans-Adam II (Johannes Adam Ferdinand Alois Josef Maria Marco d'Aviano Pius; born 14 February 1945) is the Prince of Liechtenstein, reigning since 1989. As a member of the Liechtenstein princely family, he also holds the title of Duke of Troppau and Jägerndorf and Count of Rietberg.

The eldest child of Prince Franz Joseph II and Countess Georgina von Wilczek, Hans-Adam was educated at Schottengymnasium in Austria and in Lyceum Alpinum Zuoz in Switzerland. He then worked as a bank trainee in London before enrolling at the University of St. Gallen to study business administration, where Hans-Adam graduated with a licentiate in 1969. In 1984, Prince Franz Joseph handed over power and everyday duties of the monarch to Hans-Adam, with Hans-Adam thus becoming regent, while his father remained monarch. Following his father's death in 1989, Hans-Adam ascended to the throne.

In 2004, similar to his father's example, Hans-Adam also made his eldest son hereditary prince Alois the country's regent, while remaining its monarch. Since the death of Harald V of Norway in August 2026, Hans-Adam has been Europe's oldest reigning monarch.

== Early life ==
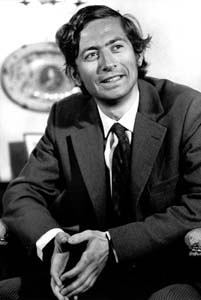
Photo by Erling Mandelmann, 1974

Hans-Adam II was born on 14 February 1945 in Zürich, Switzerland, as the eldest son of Prince Franz Joseph II and Princess Gina of Liechtenstein, with his godfather being Pope Pius XII. His father had succeeded as Prince of Liechtenstein in 1938 upon the death of his childless grand-uncle, Prince Franz I, and Hans-Adam was thus hereditary prince from birth.

In 1956, he entered the Schottengymnasium in Vienna. In 1960, he transferred to the Lyceum Alpinium Zuoz in Switzerland, earning a Swiss Matura and a German Abitur in 1965. He then worked as a bank trainee in London before enrolling at the University of St. Gallen to study business administration, graduating with a licentiate in 1969. He is fluent in English and French in addition to his native German.

In 1984, Prince Franz Joseph II, while legally remaining head of state and retaining the title of sovereign prince, formally handed the power of making day-to-day governmental decisions to his eldest son as a way of beginning a dynastic transition to a new generation. Hans-Adam formally succeeded as Prince of Liechtenstein upon the death of his father on 13 November 1989.

== Powers ==
A referendum to adopt Hans-Adam's revision of the Constitution of Liechtenstein to expand his powers passed in 2003. The prince had threatened to abdicate and leave the country if the referendum did not result in his favour.

On August 15, 2004, Hans-Adam formally handed the power of making day-to-day governmental decisions to his eldest son Hereditary Prince Alois as regent, as a way of beginning a dynastic transition to a new generation. Legally, Hans-Adam remains the head of state. Hans-Adam's father Franz Joseph II had similarly done so for him on 26 August 1984.

In a July 2012 referendum, the people of Liechtenstein overwhelmingly rejected a proposal to curtail the political power of the princely family. A few days before the vote, Hereditary Prince Alois announced he would veto any relaxing of the ban on abortion, also up for referendum. Seventy-six percent of those voting in the first referendum supported Alois' power to veto the outcome of future referendums. Legislators, who serve on a part-time basis, rose in the hereditary prince's defence on 23 May, voting 18 to 7 against the citizens' initiative.

== Viewpoints and controversies ==
Throughout his reign, Hans-Adam has been a prominent proponent of strengthening Liechtenstein's economic and political independence from Switzerland, with which Liechtenstein has been in a customs union since 1924. In a speech from 1970 nicknamed the "backpack speech", Hans-Adam declared his intentions to push for an independent Liechtenstein foreign policy. He was a major proponent of Liechtenstein joining the United Nations, which the country successfully did in 1990.

Hans-Adam instigated the 1992 Liechtenstein constitutional crisis by calling for a referendum regarding Liechtenstein's accession to the European Economic Area to be held in advance of the corresponding one in Switzerland, against the wishes of both the government and the Landtag of Liechtenstein. On 28 October 1992, he threatened to dissolve the Landtag and dismiss the Prime Minister of Liechtenstein, Hans Brunhart, over the dispute and appoint an acting prime minister in his place. In response, approximately 2,000 people demonstrated in front of the government house in Vaduz. On the same day, the government and Hans-Adam II negotiated and came to an agreement that scheduled the referendum after the corresponding one in Switzerland, though notably it affirmed that Liechtenstein would commit to agreements with the EEA despite the result in Switzerland. The event forced the customs union between Liechtenstein and Switzerland to be revised to grant Liechtenstein greater freedom in deciding its foreign policy, and Liechtenstein subsequently joined the EEA in 1995.

In 1995, Hans-Adam was the subject of a complaint to the European Convention on Human Rights against the state of Liechtenstein for the violation of freedom of speech and right to an effective remedy. This was prompted by Hans-Adam sending a letter to former Deputy Prime Minister of Liechtenstein Herbert Wille, which stated that he would not appoint Wille to a public office due to him expressing the opinion in a speech that the Liechtenstein state court should hold the final say over the prince regarding disputes with the constitution of Liechtenstein. In 1999, the ECHR ruled that a violation had taken place and the state of Liechtenstein was convicted.

In an interview with Radio Liechtenstein in February 2021, Prince Hans-Adam II expressed his support for same-sex marriage but said he opposed allowing same-sex couples to adopt.

=== Books ===
Hans-Adam has written the political treatise The State in the Third Millennium, which was published in late 2009. In it, he argues for the continued importance of the nation-state as a political actor. He makes the case for democracy as the best form of government, which he sees China and Russia as in transition towards, although the path will be difficult for these nations. He also declared his role in a princely family as something that has legitimacy only from the assent of the people. He stated that government should be limited to a small set of tasks and abilities, writing that people "have to free the state from all the unnecessary tasks and burdens with which it has been loaded during the last hundred years, which have distracted it from its two main tasks: maintenance of the rule of law and foreign policy". Hans-Adam is a friend of the German anarcho-capitalist economist Hans-Hermann Hoppe.

Hans-Adam wrote to the foreword to a Sourcebook, on Self-Determination and Self-Administration, which was edited by Wolfgang F. Danspeckgruber and Arthur Watts, and in the Encyclopedia Princetoniensis.

=== Interest in UFO research ===
Hans-Adam has financed research into UFOs for decades and is said to have a great personal interest in ufology. This became public through the diaries of the well-known ufologist and astronomer Jacques Vallée, whom Hans-Adam had invited to his castle. He also worked with the American businessman Robert Bigelow, who has also financed UFO research. Hans-Adam's interest in the phenomenon is said to have been sparked by a UFO sighting by his aunt in Munich in the 1950s.

== Entrepreneurship and personal wealth ==
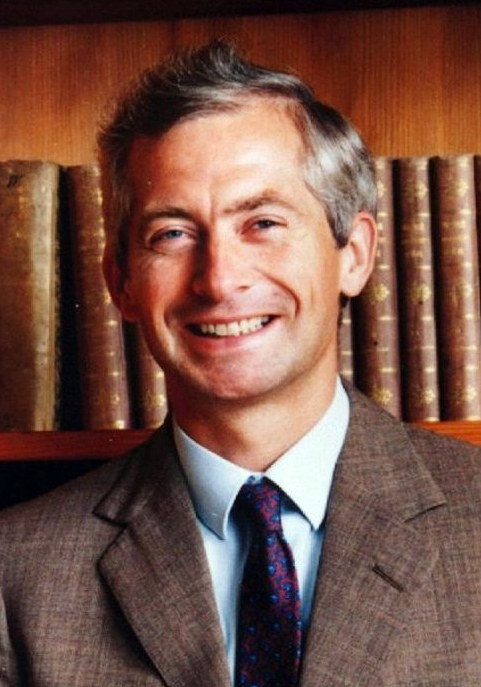
Hans-Adam II led the LGT Bank on an expansion course until his accession to the throne in 1989.

Before his accession to the throne, he transformed LGT Bank which is wholly owned by his family, from a small local bank into an internationally operating financial group. As of 2003 he had a family fortune of US$7.6 billion and a personal fortune of about US$4 billion, making him one of the world's richest heads of state, and Europe's wealthiest monarch.

He inherited his main residence, Vaduz Castle in Liechtenstein, furthermore in Austria Liechtenstein Castle, Wilfersdorf Castle (with a wine farm), the Liechtenstein Garden Palace and the Liechtenstein City Palace in Vienna. In addition to real estate, viticulture, agriculture and forestry, the prince owns a number of companies, the most important being the American company RiceTec.

He also inherited an extensive art collection, much of which is displayed for the public at the Liechtenstein Museum in Vienna. As of July 2022, his net worth was estimated by Bloomberg Billionaires Index around US$6.20 billion, making him the 380th richest person on earth. However, he placed these assets in a family foundation, the Prince of Liechtenstein Foundation, from which each family member receives an equal annual allowance and which maintains the family's castles, cultural assets, collections and museums and last but not least, the costs of the princely court including even some salaries for princes who are ambassadors abroad, which are not a burden on the taxpayer.

His successful entrepreneurship allowed him to buy back parts of the family art collection which his father had to sell after World War II due to lack of money after his vast land holdings in Czechoslovakia had been expropriated (measuring 7.5 times the total area of the Principality itself) and after his Austrian properties had become inaccessible until the end of the Soviet occupation in 1955. In addition, he continues to expand the collection of classical paintings and applied arts to this day.

== Personal life ==
On 30 July 1967, at St. Florin's in Vaduz, he married his second cousin once removed Countess Marie Kinsky of Wchinitz and Tettau. They have four children and fifteen grandchildren:

- Alois Philipp Maria, Hereditary Prince of Liechtenstein, Regent of Liechtenstein, Count of Rietberg (born on 11 June 1968 in Zürich, Canton of Zürich, Switzerland). Married to German Duchess Sophie Elisabeth Marie Gabrielle in Bavaria (born on 28 October 1967) in July 1993. They have four children:
  - Prince Joseph Wenzel Maximilian Maria of Liechtenstein, Count of Rietberg (born on 24 May 1995 at Portland Hospital in London, England, United Kingdom).
  - Princess Marie Caroline Elisabeth Immaculata of Liechtenstein, Countess of Rietberg (born on 17 October 1996 in Grabs, Canton of St. Gallen, Switzerland).
  - Prince Georg Antonius Constantin Maria of Liechtenstein, Count of Rietberg (born on 20 April 1999 in Grabs, Canton of St. Gallen, Switzerland).
  - Prince Nikolaus Sebastian Alexander Maria of Liechtenstein, Count of Rietberg (born on 6 December 2000 in Grabs, Canton of St. Gallen, Switzerland).
- Prince Maximilian Nikolaus Maria of Liechtenstein, Count of Rietberg (born on 16 May 1969 in St. Gallen, Canton of St. Gallen, Switzerland), known professionally as Max von Liechtenstein. Married to Panamanian-American Angela Gisela Brown (born on 3 February 1958) in January 2000. They have one son:
  - Prince Alfons "Alfonso" Constantin Maria of Liechtenstein, Count of Rietberg (born on 18 May 2001 in London, England, United Kingdom).
- Prince Constantin Ferdinand Maria of Liechtenstein, Count of Rietberg (born on 15 March 1972 in St. Gallen, Canton of St. Gallen, Switzerland – died on 5 December 2023), known professionally as Constantin Liechtenstein. Married to Austrian Countess Marie Gabriele Franziska Kálnoky de Kőröspatak (born on 16 July 1975) in May 1999. They have three children:
  - Prince Moritz Emanuel Maria of Liechtenstein, Count of Rietberg (born on 27 May 2003 in New York City, New York, United States)
  - Princess Georgina "Gina" Maximiliana Tatiana Maria of Liechtenstein, Countess of Rietberg (born on 23 July 2005 in Vienna, Austria)
  - Prince Benedikt Ferdinand Hubertus Maria of Liechtenstein, Count of Rietberg (born on 18 May 2008 in Vienna, Austria)
- Princess Tatjana Nora Maria of Liechtenstein, Countess of Rietberg (born on 10 April 1973 in St. Gallen, Canton of St. Gallen, Switzerland), also known after marriage as Tatjana von Lattorff. She graduated from European Business School in Madrid, Spain and is fluent in German, English, French and Spanish. Princess Tatjana is a patron of SOS Children's Village Liechtenstein, president of Princess Gina of Liechtenstein Foundation and also president of the board of trustees of Prince Franz Josef of Liechtenstein Foundation. In 2020, she became the president of the Vienna International School Association. Married to German Baron Matthias Claus-Just Carl Philipp von Lattorff (born on 25 March 1968 in Graz, Styria, Austria) on 5 June 1999. Baron Philipp is the eldest son of Baron Claus-Jürgen von Lattorff and Countess Julia Batthyány von Angol-Ujvár. He worked for Boehringer Ingelheim as a CEO and is the vice president of Federation of Austrian Industries. They have seven children:
  - Lukas Maria von Lattorff (born on 13 May 2000 in Wiesbaden, Hesse, Germany). Married to Countess Marie von Wilczek on 6 June 2026.
  - Elisabeth Maria Angela Tatjana von Lattorff (born on 25 January 2002 in Grabs, Canton of St. Gallen, Switzerland)
  - Marie Teresa von Lattorff (born on 18 January 2004 in Grabs, Canton of St. Gallen, Switzerland)
  - Camilla Maria Katharina von Lattorff (born on 4 November 2005 in Monza, Lombardy, Italy)
  - Anna Pia Theresia Maria von Lattorff (born on 3 August 2007 in Goldgeben, Lower Austria, Austria)
  - Sophie Katharina Maria von Lattorff (born on 30 October 2009 in Goldgeben, Lower Austria, Austria)
  - Maximilian Maria von Lattorff (born on 17 December 2011 in Goldgeben, Lower Austria, Austria)

They remained married until her death on 21 August 2021 at the age of 81.

The Prince is an honorary member of K.D.St.V. Nordgau Prag Stuttgart, a Catholic students' fraternity that is a member of the Union of Catholic German Student Fraternities.

The Prince donated $12 million in 2000 to found the Liechtenstein Institute on Self-Determination (LISD) at Princeton University's Princeton School of Public and International Affairs. In his childhood, he joined the Pfadfinder und Pfadfinderinnen Liechtensteins in Vaduz. He is also a former member of the Viennese Scout Group "Wien 16-Schotten". He is a member of the World Scout Foundation.

His younger son Prince Constantin died on 5 December 2023 at the age of 51.

== Titles, styles and honours ==
=== Titles and styles ===
- 14 February 1945 – 13 November 1989: His Serene Highness The Hereditary Prince of Liechtenstein
- 13 November 1989 – present: His Serene Highness The Prince of Liechtenstein

The official title of the monarch is "Prince of Liechtenstein, Duke of Troppau and Jägerndorf, Count of Rietberg, Sovereign of the House of Liechtenstein" (German: Fürst von und zu Liechtenstein, Herzog von Troppau und Jägerndorf, Graf zu Rietberg, Regierer des Hauses von und zu Liechtenstein).

=== Honours and awards ===
==== Foreign ====
- Austria
  - (Austria-Hungary) Austrian-Hungarian Imperial and Royal family: 1,305th Knight with Collar of the Order of the Golden Fleece
  - Austria: Grand Cross of the Decoration of Honour for Services to the Republic of Austria, Grand Star
- (Kingdom of Bavaria) Bavarian Royal Family: Knight Grand Cross of the Order of Saint Hubert

==== Awards ====
- Austria: Honorary degree of the University of Innsbruck
- Romania: Honorary degree of the Babeș-Bolyai University

== Arms ==
Coat of arms of Hans-Adam II of Liechtenstein
| Coronet Ducal hat of Liechtenstein Escutcheon Quarterly: I Or, an eagle displayed Sable crowned and armed Or charged with a crescent treflée, issuing from the middle thereof a cross pattée Argent (Silesia); II barry of eight Or and Sable, a crown of rue bendways throughout Vert (Kuenring); III per pale Gules and Argent (Duchy of Troppau); IV Or, a harpy displayed Sable the human parts Argent crowned and armed Or (Cirksena); on a point entée Azure, a bugle-horn stringed Or (Duchy of Jägerndorf); en surtout, an inescutcheon per fess or and Gules (House of Liechtenstein). |

== See also ==
- Line of succession to the Liechtensteiner throne
- List of monarchs of Liechtenstein
- Prince of Liechtenstein Foundation
- Princely Family of Liechtenstein

Hans-Adam II of Liechtenstein House of Liechtenstein Born: 14 February 1945
Regnal titles
| Preceded by Franz Josef II | Prince of Liechtenstein; 1989–present | Incumbent; Heir apparent: Alois |
