= Liechtenstein Red Cross =

Humanitarian organisation based in Liechtenstein

- Liechtensteinisches Rotes Kreuz
- Logo in German

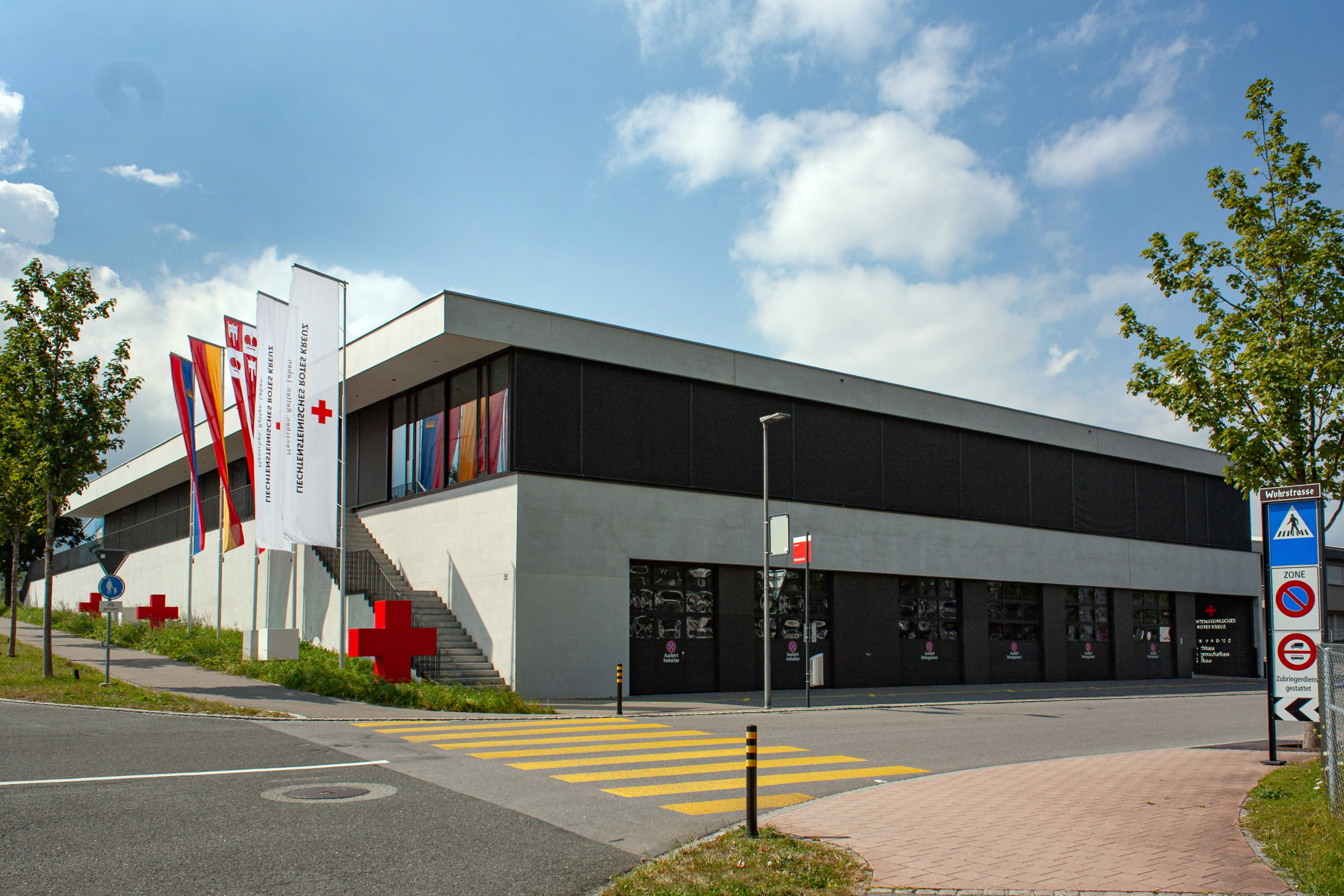
- Headquarters in Vaduz
- Formation: 30 April 1945; 80 years ago
- Purpose: Humanitarian aid
- Headquarters: Vaduz, Liechtenstein
- Coordinates: 47°07′58.79″N 9°30′48.85″E
- Region served: Liechtenstein
- President: Sophie, Hereditary Princess of Liechtenstein
- Parent organization: International Federation of Red Cross and Red Crescent Societies
- Website: roteskreuz.li

The Liechtenstein Red Cross (German: Liechtensteinisches Rotes Kreuz), or LRK, is the national Red Cross society for Liechtenstein, conducting humanitarian aid in cooperation with the International Committee of the Red Cross (ICRC). The LRK was formed on 30 April 1945 under the initiative of Gina, Princess of Liechtenstein, to address the refugee crisis in Liechtenstein following the end of World War II. It was officially recognised as a part of the Red Cross society on 22 June 1945, headed by Princess Gina until 1985, then Marie, Princess of Liechtenstein until 2015. Since LRK has been led by Sophie, Hereditary Princess of Liechtenstein.

== Operations ==
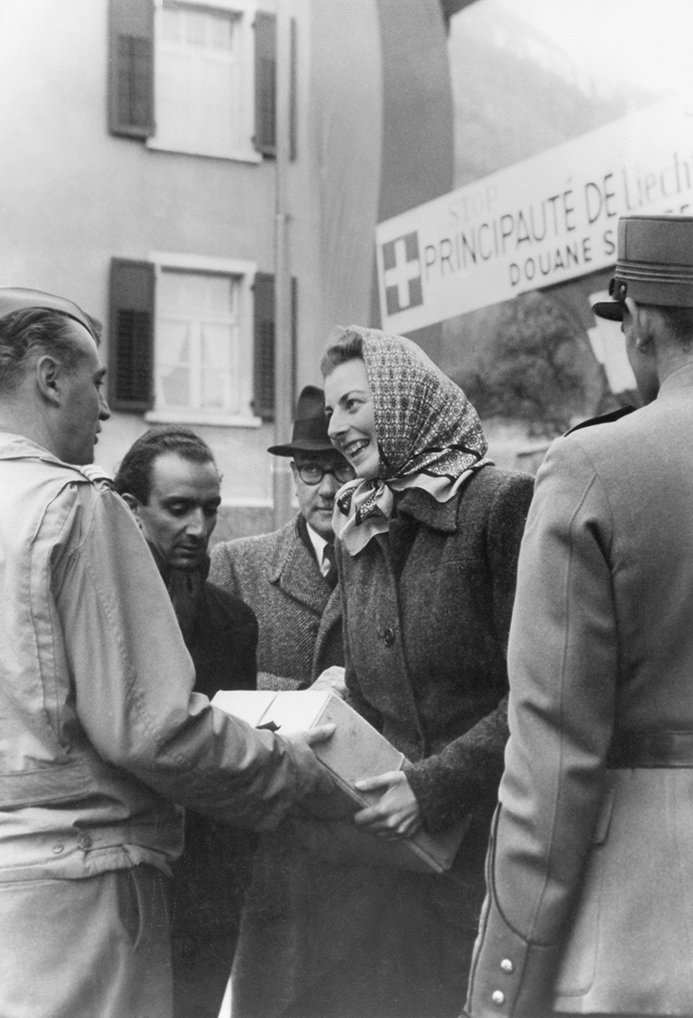
Princess Gina with Josef Hoop in French-occupied Feldkirch presenting gifts for the wounded to the French city commander, 1945.

The LRK was initially formed to care for the 7,000 war refugees that crossed into Liechtenstein in the closing weeks of World War II, providing soup kitchens and bathing services near Schaanwald, while calling the population of Liechtenstein to donate towards aiding the refugees. Most notably, it cared for soldiers of the pro-Axis First Russian National Army when they took refuge in the country near the end of the war. It also provided assistance in neighbouring Allied-occupied Austria and was later expanded to include domestic coverage. In 1946, a mother's advice centre was established domestically, expanding to cover family welfare from 1994 until 1996.

In 1956, a children's home was opened in Triesen, which was later moved to Schaan in 1965. The organisation has offered blood donations since 1953 and has operated rescue services since 1972. The organisation has also come out in support of greater action to combat climate change. The provision of foreign humanitarian aid and refugee assistance conducted by the LRK has included the Hungarian Revolution of 1956, the 1968 invasion of Czechoslovakia, the Vietnam War, and, after the Revolutions of 1989, in which the LRK also conducted its own initiatives in Eastern Europe through the use of private contacts. It has also included aid to refugees of the Yugoslav Wars and the Russian invasion of Ukraine. It has provided assistance to people affected by the Nagorno-Karabakh conflict.

== See also ==
- International Red Cross and Red Crescent Movement
- Healthcare in Liechtenstein
