= European Business School Madrid =

European Business School Madrid (EBS) is located in Madrid, Spain. The private business school offers foundation, undergraduate and postgraduate courses with a specialism in international business with language skills. Courses are offered in Spanish only in cooperation with the Centro Universitario Villanueva.
