= Orders, decorations, and medals of Liechtenstein =

Coat of Arms of Liechtenstein

The Principality of Liechtenstein is the last independent principality of the Holy Roman Empire. After the fall of the empire, Liechtenstein aligned itself with Austria-Hungary until the end of World War I. Since that time, Liechtenstein has been most closely aligned with its neutral neighbor Switzerland. The honours system of Liechtenstein is made up of an order of merit, established in 1937, and a limited number of commemorative medals that were awarded during the 20th century.

== Orders ==
- Order of Merit of the Principality of Liechtenstein (Fürstlich liechtensteinischen Verdienstorden).

== Medals of orders ==
- Princely Liechtenstein Medal of Merit (Fürstlich liechtensteinische Verdienstzeichen).

== Decorations ==
- Cross of Honour of Prince Johann II of Liechtenstein, 1874 (Ehrenkreuz Fürst Johann II von und zu Liechtenstein).
- Long-service awards of the Liechtenstein military, 1847 (Dienstauszeichnungen). For 10, 15 and 20 years of service.

== Commemorative medals ==
- Commemorative Medal for the Golden Jubilee of HSH Prince Johan II, 1908 (Fürstlich Liechtenstein'sche Jubiläums-Erinnerungs-Medaille).
- Commemorative Medal for the 50th birthday of HSH Prince Franz Joseph II, 1956 (Gedenkmedaille zum 50. Geburtstag).
- Commemorative Medal for the 70th birthday of HSH Prince Franz Joseph II, 1976 (Gedenkmedaille zum 70. Geburtstag).
