= 2009 Liechtenstein general election =

- 8 February 2009
- All 25 seats in the Landtag; 13 seats needed for a majority
- Turnout: 84.64% (▼1.81pp)
Party	Leader	Vote %	Seats	+/–
VU	Klaus Tschütscher	47.61	13	+3
FBP	Otmar Hasler	43.47	11	−1
FL	Egon Matt; Claudia Heeb-Fleck	8.92	1	−2
This lists parties that won seats. See the complete results below.
Vote share by municipality
Prime Minister before	Prime Minister after
Otmar Hasler; FBP	Klaus Tschütscher; VU

General elections were held in Liechtenstein on 8 February 2009 to elect the 25 members of the Landtag. The Patriotic Union (VU) won a majority of thirteen seats, with the Progressive Citizens' Party (FBP) winning eleven. The Free List (FL) won one seat. Voter turnout was 86.6%.

Incumbent prime minister, Otmar Hasler of the FBP, sought re-election for a third term, while the VU nominated incumbent deputy prime minister, Klaus Tschütscher, for the position. The Free List nominated Pepo Frick and Helen Konzett Bargetze as government candidates. Following the elections, Hasler resigned and the FBP and VU formed a renewed coalition government, ultimately under the leadership of Tschütscher. The new government was sworn in on 25 March 2009. As of the 2025 elections, Hasler is the most recent prime minister to lose re-election.

== Background ==
In the 2005 elections the Progressive Citizens' Party (FBP) won twelve seats and lost its majority, whereas the Patriotic Union (VU) won ten seats and the Free List (FL) won three seats. As a result, the FBP and VU formed a coalition government, which had previously ended in 1997, with Otmar Hasler continuing as prime minister.

Hasler's second term was marked by continued efforts to reform the Liechtenstein financial centre following the 1999–2001 financial crisis. However, starting from early 2008 a tax affair begun where it was revealed that millions of euros belonging to hundreds of citizens living in Germany were channelled into the LGT Bank and other banks in Liechtenstein, taking advantage of Liechtenstein-based trusts to evade paying taxes in Germany. The newspaper Die Welt described the event as a "government crisis".

Hugo Quaderer of the VU resigned from the Landtag in April 2005 in order to become a government councillor and was succeeded by Henrik Caduff.

== Landtag members not running for re-election ==
Member	Constituency	First elected	Party
Heinz Vogt	Oberland	2005	Patriotic Union
Alois Beck	Oberland	Feb 1993	Progressive Citizens' Party
Klaus Wanger	Oberland	Oct 1993	Progressive Citizens' Party
Josy Biedermann	Oberland	2005	Progressive Citizens' Party
Paul Vogt	Oberland	Feb 1993	Free List
Ivo Klein	Unterland	2001	Patriotic Union
Markus Büchel	Unterland	2001	Progressive Citizens' Party
Franz Heeb	Unterland	2005	Progressive Citizens' Party
Rudolf Lampert	Unterland	Oct 1993	Progressive Citizens' Party

== Electoral system ==
The 25 members of the Landtag are elected by open list proportional representation from two constituencies, Oberland with 15 seats and Unterland with 10 seats. Voters voted for a party list and then may have struck through candidates for whom they did not wish to cast a preferential vote, and may also have added names of candidates from other lists. The electoral threshold to win a seat was 8%. Landtag members sit for a four-year term. Once formed, the Landtag elected the prime minister and two government councillors who were then appointed by the reigning prince to govern in a cabinet. Voting was compulsory by law, and those who failed to vote without a valid reason may be fined, but it was not enforced. Polling stations were open only for one and a half hours on election day. Citizens over 18 years of age who had been resident in the country for at least one month prior to election day were eligible to vote.

== Campaign ==
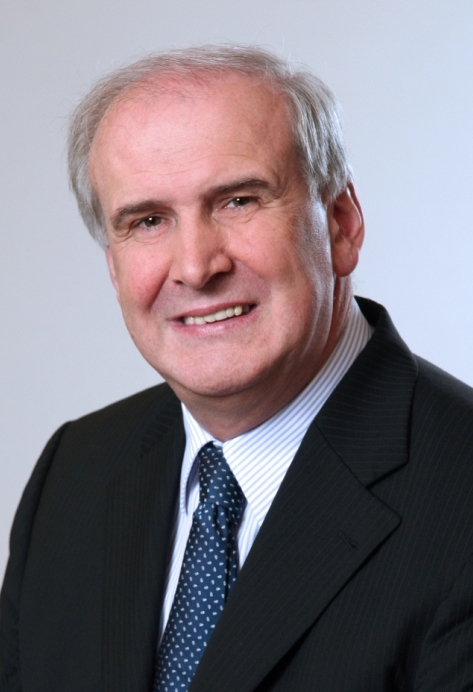
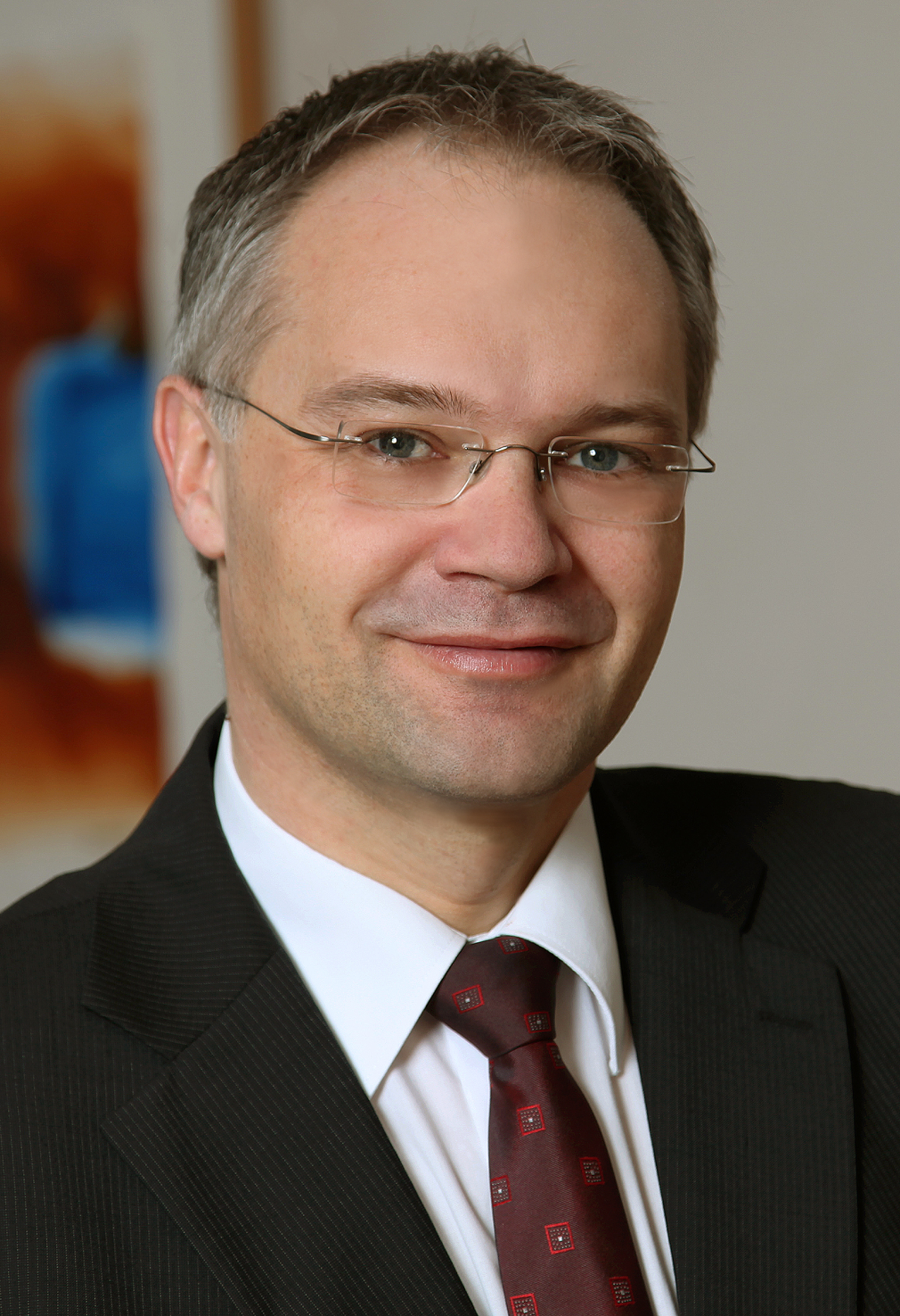
Otmar Hasler (left) and Klaus Tschütscher (right) were the FBP and VU's respective nominations for prime minister

Hasler was renominated by the FBP on 4 October 2008. Additionally, the party nominated Martin Meyer and Aurelia Frick as government candidates. The party launched its campaign the following month with the slogan "No time for experiments." (German: Keine Zeit für Experimente). The party aimed to gain a majority in the Landtag and form a coalition with Hasler as prime minister. Hasler declared that he would not be a part of the next government should the party loose the election.

The VU nominated incumbent deputy prime minister Klaus Tschütscher for prime minister in April 2008. Additionally, the party nominated Hugo Quaderer and Renate Müssner as government candidates. Tschütscher and party-president Adolf Heeb stated that they were open to the formation of a coalition government with Tschütscher as prime minister. Similarly to Hasler, Tschütscher also declared that he would not be a part of the next government should the party loose the election.

Major issues of the election were the Liechtenstein state budget and taxation. In the midst of the tax affair, the FBP campaigned on overhauling the tax system towards a more transparent system compatible with international standards on tax data exchange. Additionally, the party campaigned on ensuring financial sustainability, creating jobs, and continued reforms in the education system. Similarly, the VU campaigned on implementing tax legislation that is compatible with the European Union; the party also campaigned on strengthening Liechtenstein's economic power, and Tschütscher advocated for a liberal economic policy, more economic education, and stopping growing government spending.

The Free List presented its Landtag candidates on 14 November 2008; the party had previously indicated that it was available to form a coalition government, but both the FBP and VU rejected this. Additionally, the Free List nominated Pepo Frick and Helen Konzett Bargetze as government candidates, the first time the party nominated government candidates in its history. The party campaigned on reforming the banking sector and banking secrecy laws; the party campaigned with the slogan "Vote smart – gain a lot" (German: Wüssa schtimma – viel gwünna).

== Candidates ==
Candidates had the same eligibility criteria as voters. Political parties in Liechtenstein required the support of 30 voters from a constituency to be eligible to nominate a candidate list in it. A total of 62 candidates contested the election; 42 men and 20 women.

Oberland	FBP	VU	FL
Oberland	Peter Lampert; Wendelin Lampert; Elmar Kindle; Christian Batliner; Doris Frommelt; Albert Frick; Helmuth Büchel; Stefan Wenaweser; Kurt Eberle; Hilmar Schädler; Daniel Seger; Margot Sele-Heeb; Christian Hausmann; Patrick Schürmann; Walter Marxer	Arthur Brunhart; Jürgen Beck; Gebhard Negele; Harry Quaderer; Thomas Vogt; Diana Hilti; Gisela Biedermann; Peter Hilti; Marion Kindle; Leander Schädler; Gilbert Frommelt; René B. Ott; Henrik Caduff; Mirjam Amann; Ilse Gassner-Bühler	Pepo Frick; Helen Konzett Bargetze; Claudia Heeb-Fleck; Andreas Heeb; Albert Eberle; Ibrahim Türkyilmaz; Astrid Walser
Unterland	FBP	VU	FL
Unterland	Johannes Kaiser; Renate Wohlwend; Gerold Büchel; Manfred Batliner; Rainer Gopp; Hubert Lampert; Johanna Noser; Agatha Pino Maqueda; Cornelia Gassner; Norbert Hasler	Günther Kranz; Peter Büchel; Doris Beck; Marlies Amann-Marxer; Werner Kranz; Dominik Oehri; Gerald Meier; Wolfgang Matt; Markus Öhri; Anita Senti	Andrea Matt; Robert Büchel-Thalmaier; Claudia Robinigg; Patrick Risch; Edith Willburger
Source: Landtagswahlen 2009

== Results ==
The VU received 47.6% of the vote, a 9.4% increase from their 2005 performance, and won a majority of thirteen seats in the Landtag. The FBP received 43.5% of the vote, a 5.2% decrease from 2005, and won eleven seats at a loss of one. The Free List saw its vote share decrease from 13% to 8.9% from 2005 and won one seat at a decrease of two.

A total of 15,650 ballots were cast, resulting in a 84.6% voter turnout. The majority of votes (80%) were cast by post.

Party	Votes	%	Seats	+/–
Patriotic Union	95,219	47.61	13	+3
Progressive Citizens' Party	86,951	43.47	11	–1
Free List	17,835	8.92	1	–2
Total	200,005	100.00	25	0
Valid votes	15,126	96.64		
Invalid/blank votes	526	3.36		
Total votes	15,652	100.00		
Registered voters/turnout	18,493	84.64		
Source: Landtagswahlen 2009

=== By electoral district ===
Electoral district	Seats	Electorate	Party	Elected members	Substitutes	Votes	%	Swing	Seats won	+/–
Oberland	15	12,105	Patriotic Union	Arthur Brunhart; Jürgen Beck; Gebhard Negele; Harry Quaderer; Thomas Vogt; Diana Hilti; Gisela Biedermann; Peter Hilti	Marion Kindle; Leander Schädler	71,469	48.9	▲9.9	8	▲2
Oberland	15	12,105	Progressive Citizens' Party	Peter Lampert; Wendelin Lampert; Elmar Kindle; Christian Batliner; Doris Frommelt; Albert Frick	Helmuth Büchel; Stefan Wenaweser	61,033	41.7	▼5.0	6	▼1
Oberland	15	12,105	Free List	Pepo Frick	Helen Konzett Bargetze	13,733	9.4	▼4.9	1	▼1
Unterland	10	6,388	Patriotic Union	Günther Kranz; Peter Büchel; Doris Beck; Marlies Amann-Marxer; Werner Kranz	Dominik Oehri	23,750	44.2	▲8.0	5	▲1
Unterland	10	6,388	Progressive Citizens' Party	Johannes Kaiser; Renate Wohlwend; Gerold Büchel; Manfred Batliner; Rainer Gopp	Hubert Lampert	25,915	54.3	▼6.1	5	0
Unterland	10	6,388	Free List	–	–	4,102	7.6	▼1.9	0	▼1
Source: Landtagswahlen 2009

== Aftermath ==
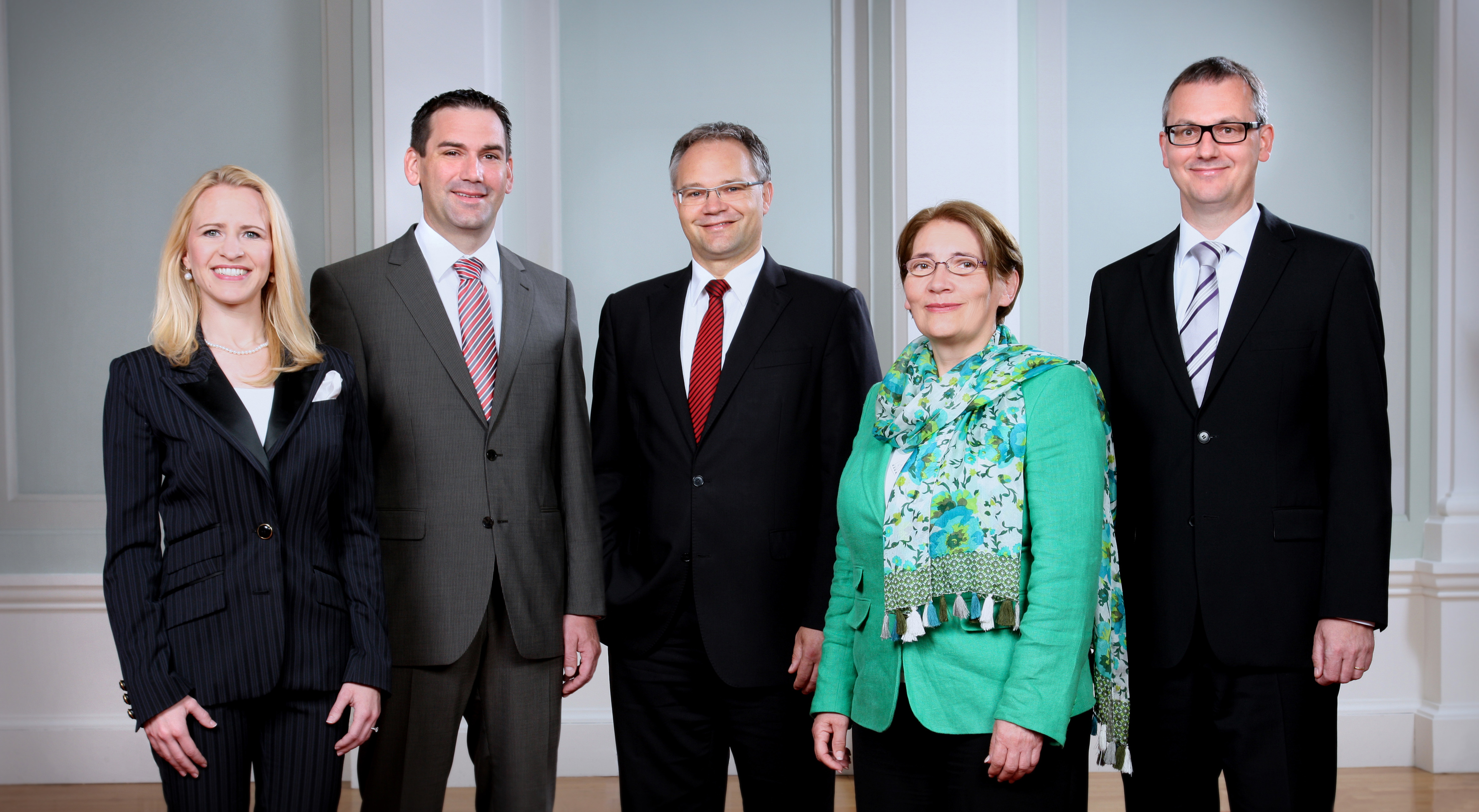
The government of Klaus Tschütscher

Upon the election results being released, Hasler announced his resignation as prime minister. The VU invited the FBP to begin negotiations for a renewed coalition government, which the FBP accepted. The two parties entered into a renewed coalition government, ultimately under the leadership of Tschütscher. As the junior party in the coalition, Martin Meyer became deputy prime minister. The new government was sworn in on 25 March 2009. A survey conducted following the election suggested that 90% of respondents supported another coalition government. Arthur Brunhart of the VU became President of the Landtag, with Doris Frommelt of the FBP as vice president.

It was postulated by Wilfried Marxer of the Liechtenstein Institute that the success of the VU came from traditional VU voters returning to the party after supporting the FBP in 2005. In addition, Tschütscher was a more popular candidate than Hasler due to distancing himself from European Union-related demands regarding banking secrecy; the FBP was credited with losing votes due to dissatisfaction with the government and anti-incumbency sentiment. As of the 2025 elections, Hasler is the most recent prime minister to lose re-election. The Free List suffered a significant defeat, with Andrea Matt losing her seat, and as a result party presidents Egon Matt and Claudia Heeb-Fleck resigned, being succeeded by Wolfgang Marxer in June.

== See also ==
- Elections in Liechtenstein
- List of Liechtenstein general elections

== Bibliography ==
- Marxer, Wilfried (2009). Landtagswahlen 2009: Regierungsbildung und Wählerpräferenzen in Liechtenstein (PDF) (in German). Bendern: Liechtenstein-Institut.
- Marxer, Wilfried (2000). Wahlverhalten und Wahlmotive im Fürstentum Liechtenstein (PDF) (in German). Vaduz: Verlag der Liechtensteinischen Akademischen Gesellschaft. ISBN 3-7211-1044-7.
