= First Adrian Hasler cabinet =

Governing body of Liechtenstein (2013–2017)

- Government of Liechtenstein

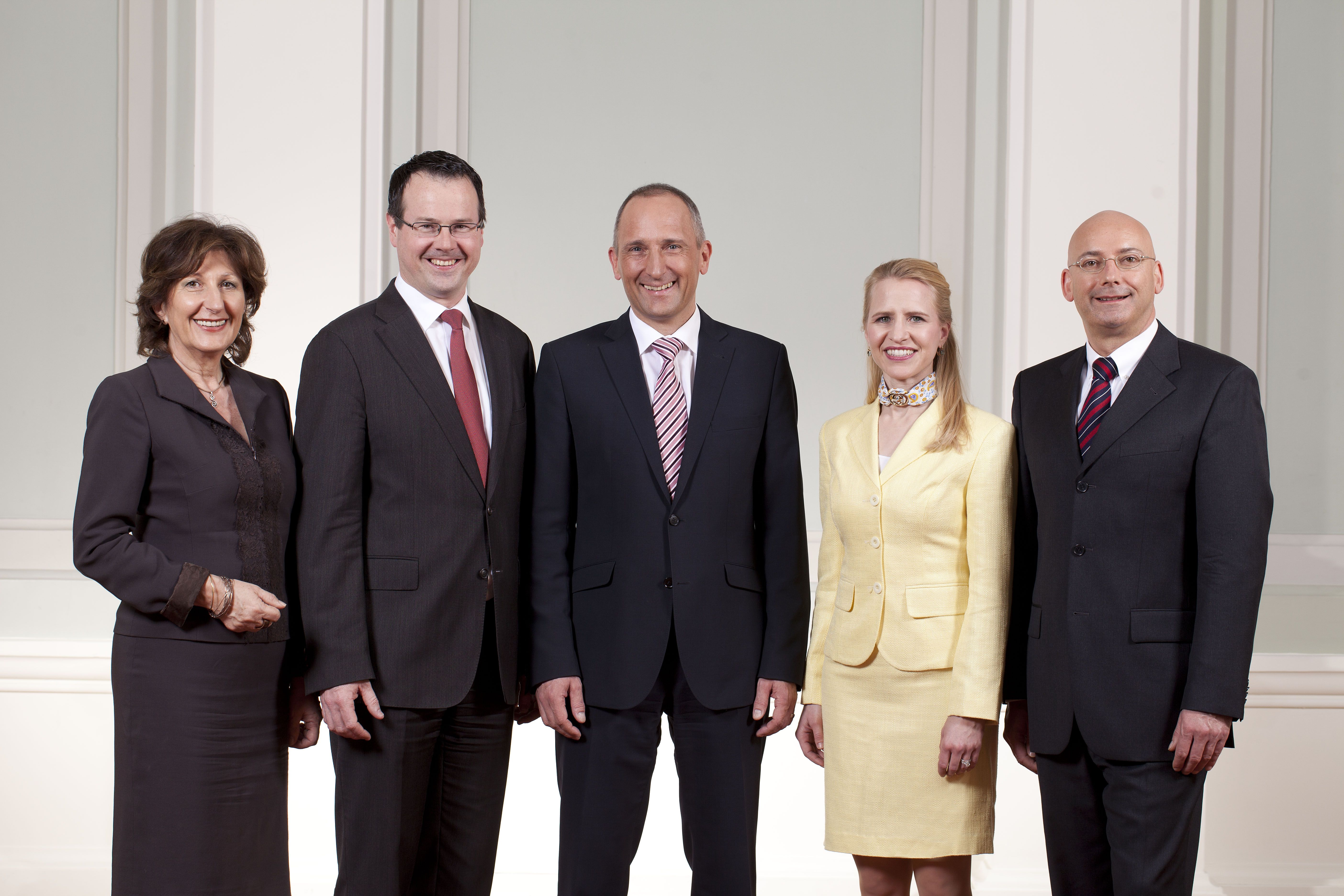
- Official photograph, 2013
- Date formed: 27 March 2013
- Date dissolved: 30 March 2017

People and organisations
- Head of state: Hans-Adam II; Alois (regent)
- Head of government: Adrian Hasler
- Deputy head of government: Thomas Zwiefelhofer
- Total no. of members: 5
- Member parties: FBP; VU
- Status in legislature: Coalition
- Opposition party: Free List; The Independents

History
- Election: 2013
- Predecessor: Klaus Tschütscher cabinet
- Successor: Second Adrian Hasler cabinet

The First Adrian Hasler cabinet was the governing body of Liechtenstein from 27 March 2013 to 30 March 2017. It was appointed by Alois, Hereditary Prince of Liechtenstein on behalf of Hans-Adam II and was chaired by Adrian Hasler.

== History ==
In the 2013 Liechtenstein general election the Progressive Citizens' Party emerged as the largest party. As a result, the Klaus Tschütscher cabinet was dissolved with Adrian Hasler succeeding Klaus Tschütscher as Prime Minister of Liechtenstein. The Independents, formed the same year, became an opposition party to the cabinet, making it the first cabinet two hold two opposition parties, along with the Free List.

During the government's term, it worked on restructuring Liechtenstein's state budget. The cabinet continued and expanded the tax cooperation agreements that had been done by its predecessors following the 2008 Liechtenstein tax affair, signing tax agreements with numerous countries, such as Italy and Austria.

In addition, the government was responsible for the establishment of an asylum task force, and then an amendment to the Liechtenstein asylum law in response to the 2015 European migrant crisis.

In the 2017 Liechtenstein general election the Progressive Citizens' Party lost a seat but remained narrowly the largest party. As a result, the government was dissolved and succeeded by the Second Adrian Hasler cabinet.

== Members ==
Picture	Name	Term	Role	Party
Prime Minister
	Adrian Hasler	27 March 2013 – 30 March 2017	Finance	Progressive Citizens' Party
Deputy Prime Minister
	Thomas Zwiefelhofer	27 March 2013 – 30 March 2017	Interior; Justice; Economy	Patriotic Union
Government councillors
	Mauro Pedrazzini	27 March 2013 – 30 March 2017	Business	Progressive Citizens' Party
	Aurelia Frick	27 March 2013 – 30 March 2017	Foreign affairs; Education; Culture	Progressive Citizens' Party
	Marlies Amann-Marxer	27 March 2013 – 30 March 2017	Infrastructure; Education; Environment	Patriotic Union

== See also ==
- Politics of Liechtenstein
