= Second Otmar Hasler cabinet =

Governing body of Liechtenstein (2005–2009)

- Government of Liechtenstein

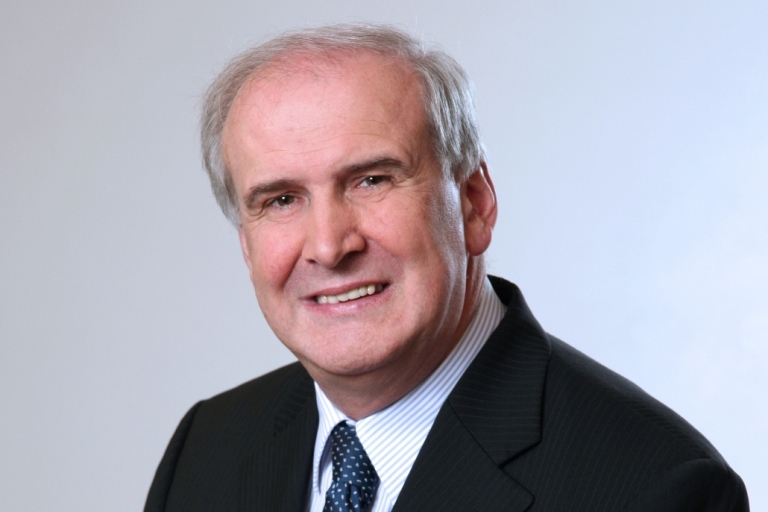
- Date formed: 21 April 2005
- Date dissolved: 25 March 2009

People and organisations
- Head of state: Hans-Adam II; Alois (regent)
- Head of government: Otmar Hasler
- Deputy head of government: Klaus Tschütscher
- Total no. of members: 5
- Member parties: FBP; VU
- Status in legislature: Coalition
- Opposition party: Free List

History
- Election: 2005
- Predecessor: First Otmar Hasler cabinet
- Successor: Klaus Tschütscher cabinet

The Second Otmar Hasler cabinet was the governing body of Liechtenstein from 21 March 2005 to 25 March 2009. It was appointed by Alois, Hereditary Prince of Liechtenstein on behalf of Hans-Adam II and was chaired by Otmar Hasler.

== History ==
The 2005 Liechtenstein general election resulted in a win for the Progressive Citizens' Party. As a result, the First Otmar Hasler cabinet was dissolved with Otmar Hasler continuing as Prime Minister of Liechtenstein. The Progressive Citizens' Party and Patriotic Union once again entered into a coalition government.

During the government's term, the 2008 Liechtenstein tax affair took place, where millions of euros belonging to hundreds of citizens living in Germany were channelled into the LGT Bank and other banks in Liechtenstein, taking advantage of Liechtenstein-based trusts to evade paying taxes in Germany. The affair overshadowed the previously planned visit of Hasler to Berlin on February 19, 2008, to meet with the minister of finance, Peer Steinbrück, and the chancellor, Angela Merkel. Merkel asked for help in the investigation and cooperation in prevention of tax evasion, pointing out that Liechtenstein provided the US Internal Revenue Service with some data but not the German Ministry of Finances.

The newspaper Die Welt described the event as a "government crisis". Alois, Hereditary Prince of Liechtenstein, called the investigations an "attack" on Liechtenstein by Germany and considered pursuing legal remedies. As a result of the affair, the government entered negotiations with a number of countries to discuss tax avoidance issues. It reached an agreement with the United Kingdom in 2009 that will allow the about 5,000 British customers of Liechtenstein's banks that hold for them about £2-3 billion in secret accounts to come clear with British tax authorities under terms of a significantly reduced penalty. The agreement opened up Liechtenstein's banks to greater transparency, but remains controversial in Liechtenstein; some banks feared that clients would move their money elsewhere.

The 2009 Liechtenstein general election resulted in a win for the Patriotic Union. As a result, the cabinet was dissolved and Hasler was by Klaus Tschütscher in the Klaus Tschütscher cabinet.

== Members ==
Picture	Name	Term	Role	Party
Prime Minister
	Otmar Hasler	21 March 2005 – 25 March 2009	Finance; Construction	Progressive Citizens' Party
Deputy Prime Minister
	Klaus Tschütscher	21 March 2005 – 25 March 2009	Justice; Business; Sport	Patriotic Union
Government councillors
	Rita Kieber-Beck	21 March 2005 – 25 March 2009	Foreign affairs; Culture; Family	Progressive Citizens' Party
	Martin Meyer	21 March 2005 – 25 March 2009	Interior; Health; Transport; Communication	Progressive Citizens' Party
	Hugo Quaderer	21 March 2005 – 25 March 2009	Social services; Education; Environment; Agriculture; Forestry	Patriotic Union

== See also ==
- Politics of Liechtenstein
