= Klaus Tschütscher cabinet =

Governing body of Liechtenstein (2009–2013)

- Government of Liechtenstein

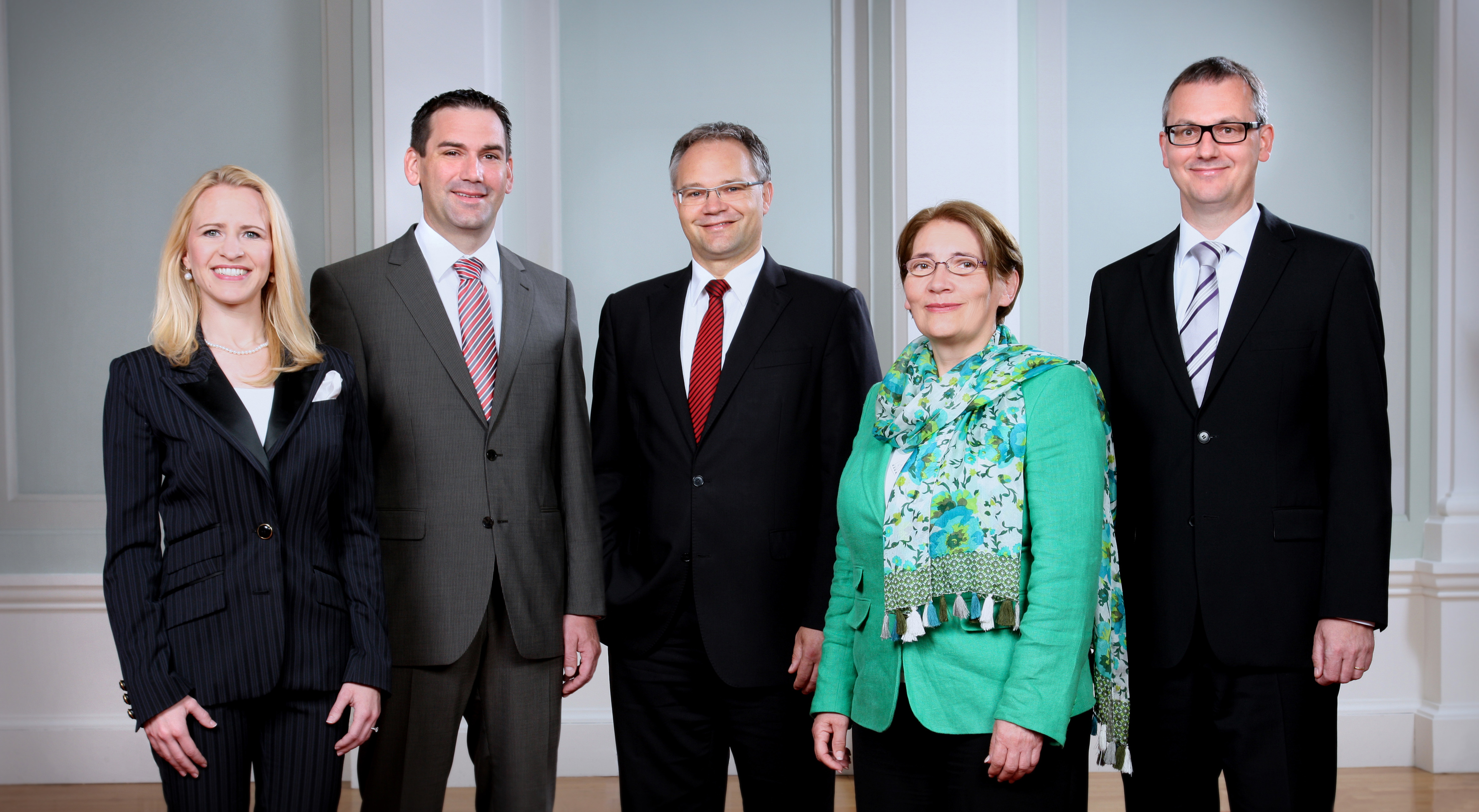
- Official photograph, 2011
- Date formed: 25 March 2009
- Date dissolved: 27 March 2013

People and organisations
- Head of state: Hans-Adam II; Alois (regent)
- Head of government: Klaus Tschütscher
- Deputy head of government: Martin Meyer
- Total no. of members: 7
- Member parties: FBP; VU
- Status in legislature: Coalition
- Opposition party: Free List

History
- Election: 2009
- Predecessor: Second Otmar Hasler cabinet
- Successor: First Adrian Hasler cabinet

The Klaus Tschütscher cabinet was the governing body of Liechtenstein from 25 March 2008 to 27 March 2013. It was appointed by Alois, Hereditary Prince of Liechtenstein on behalf of Hans-Adam II and chaired by Klaus Tschütscher

== History ==
The 2009 Liechtenstein general election resulted in a win for the Patriotic Union. As a result, the Second Otmar Hasler cabinet was dissolved and succeeded by Klaus Tschütscher as Prime Minister of Liechtenstein. The Patriotic Union and Progressive Citizens' Party once again entered into a coalition government.

The government's term in office was marked by an effort to move the country away from being a tax haven. It also included the passing of a same-sex registered partnership and Liechtenstein joining the Schengen Area in 2011.

Tschütscher did not stand for re-election in the 2013 Liechtenstein general election and was succeeded by Adrian Hasler in the First Adrian Hasler cabinet on 27 March 2013.

== Members ==
Picture	Name	Term	Role	Party
Prime Minister
	Klaus Tschütscher	25 March 2009 – 27 March 2013	Finances; Family	Patriotic Union
Deputy Prime Minister
	Martin Meyer	25 March 2009 – 27 March 2013	Economy; Construction; Transport	Progressive Citizens' Party
Government councillors
	Renate Müssner	25 March 2009 – 27 March 2013	Healthcare; Social affairs; Environment; Space; Agriculture; Forestry	Patriotic Union
	Hugo Quaderer	25 March 2009 – 27 March 2013	Home Affairs; Education; Sport	Patriotic Union
	Aurelia Frick	25 March 2009 – 27 March 2013	Foreign affairs; Justice; Culture	Progressive Citizens' Party

== See also ==
- Politics of Liechtenstein
