= First Otmar Hasler cabinet =

Governing body of Liechtenstein (2001–2005)

- Government of Liechtenstein

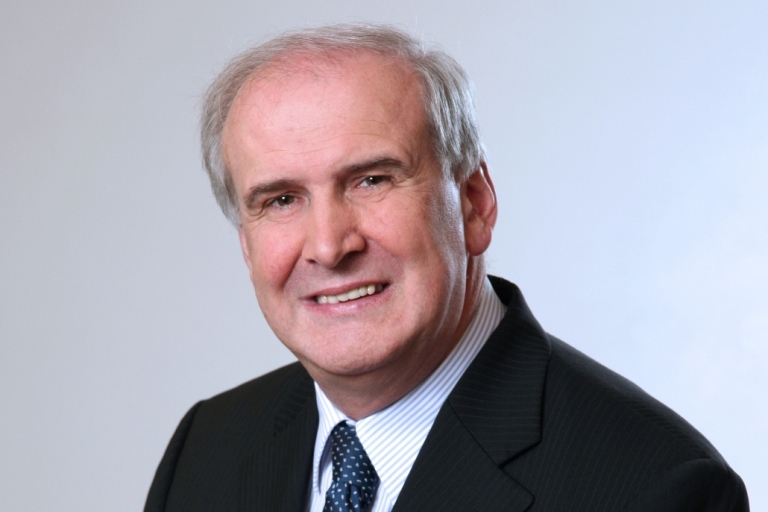
- Date formed: 5 April 2001
- Date dissolved: 21 April 2005

People and organisations
- Head of state: Hans-Adam II
- Head of government: Otmar Hasler
- Deputy head of government: Rita Kieber-Beck
- Total no. of members: 5
- Member parties: FBP
- Status in legislature: Majority
- Opposition party: Patriotic Union; Free List

History
- Election: 2001
- Predecessor: Second Mario Frick cabinet
- Successor: Second Otmar Hasler cabinet

The First Otmar Hasler cabinet was the governing body of Liechtenstein from 5 April 2001 to 21 April 2005. It was appointed by Hans-Adam II and was chaired by Otmar Hasler.

== History ==
The 2001 Liechtenstein general election resulted in a majority for the Progressive Citizens' Party. As a result, the Second Mario Frick cabinet was dissolved with Otmar Hasler succeeding Mario Frick as Prime Minister of Liechtenstein.

The government oversaw the ending of the 1999–2001 Liechtenstein financial crisis, with Liechtenstein having its blacklist from the Financial Action Task Force removed on 23 June 2001.

During the government's term, a referendum to adopt Hans-Adam's revision of the Constitution of Liechtenstein to expand his powers passed in 2003. The prince had threatened to abdicate and leave the country if the referendum did not result in his favour. In the run-up to the referendum, the government supported the proposed changes.

In the 2005 Liechtenstein general election the Progressive Citizens' Party lost a seat and with it their absolute majority, but remained the largest party. As a result, the government was dissolved and succeeded by the Second Otmar Hasler cabinet under a renewed coalition government.

== Members ==
Picture	Name	Term	Role	Party
Prime Minister
	Otmar Hasler	5 April 2001 – 21 April 2005	Finance; Construction; Family	Progressive Citizens' Party
Deputy Prime Minister
	Rita Kieber-Beck	5 April 2001 – 21 April 2005	Justice; Education; Transport	Progressive Citizens' Party
Government councillors
	Hansjörg Frick	5 April 2001 – 21 April 2005	Business; Health; Social affairs	Progressive Citizens' Party
	Alois Ospelt	5 April 2001 – 21 April 2005	Interior; Culture; Sport; Environment; Agriculture; Forestry	Progressive Citizens' Party
	Ernst Walch	5 April 2001 – 21 April 2005	Foreign affairs	Progressive Citizens' Party

== See also ==
- Politics of Liechtenstein
