= List of mayors of Ruggell =

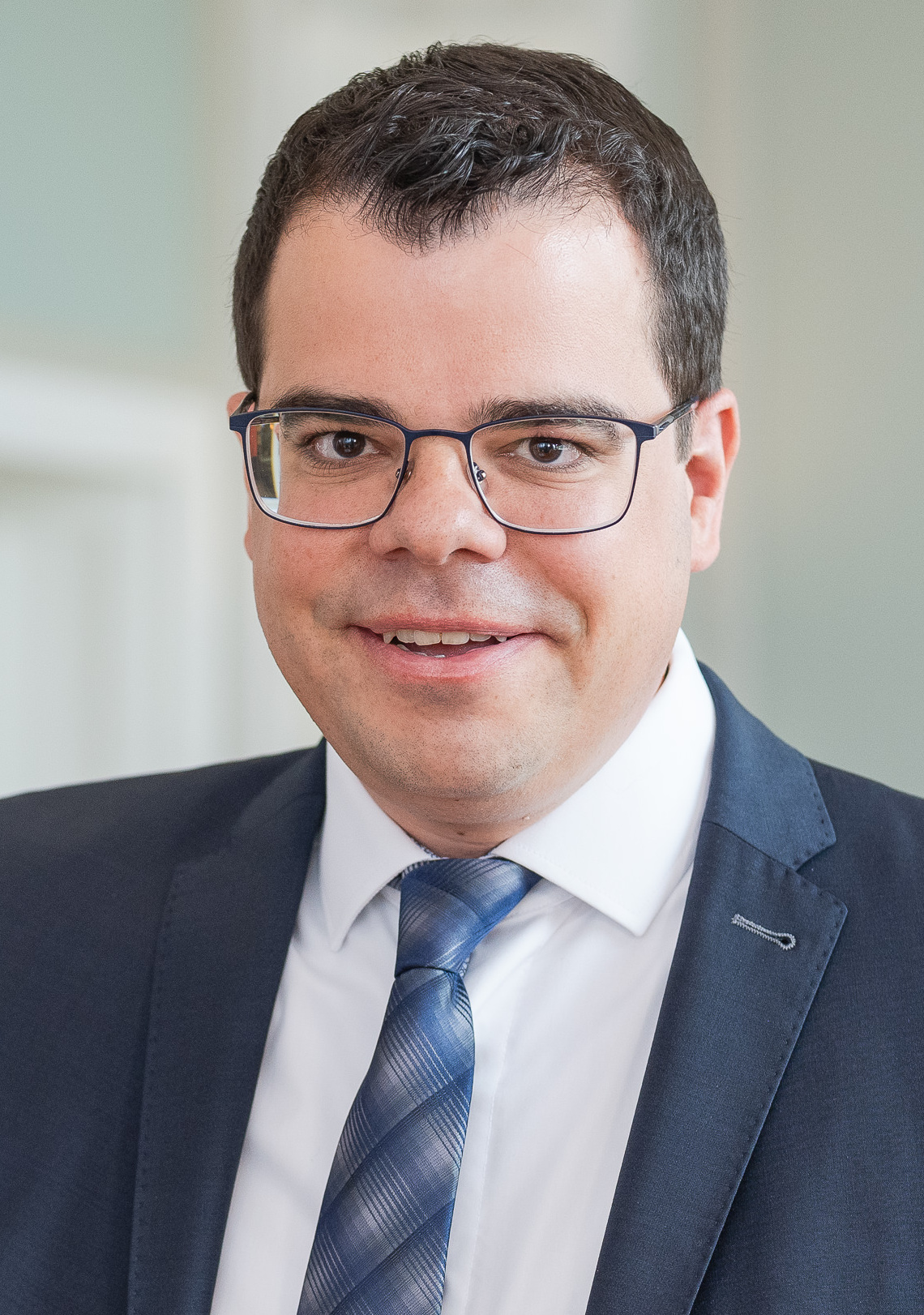
Christian Öhri, the incumbent mayor of Ruggell

The mayor of Ruggell is the head of the Ruggell municipal government. The role has existed since the introduction of the Liechtenstein municipal law of 1864.

The incumbent mayor is Christian Öhri, since 2019.

== List of mayors (1864–present) ==
List of mayors (1864–present)
No. (Note: People are numbered according to periods served by the same person. For example, Martin Öhri served as mayor for two non-consecutive terms, but is counted only once.)	Name	Term	Party	Ref(s).
1	Makarius Büchel	1864–1867	—	
2	Sebastian Heeb	1867–1870	—	
(1)	Makarius Büchel	1870–1873	—	
(2)	Sebastian Heeb	1873–1876	—	
3	Rudolf Ignaz Öhri	1876–1879	—	
(2)	Sebastian Heeb	1879–1882	—	
(3)	Rudolf Ignaz Öhri	1882–1885	—	
4	Chrysostomus Büchel	1885–1891	—	
5	Franz Josef Hoop	1891–1894	—	
(4)	Chrysostomus Büchel	1894–1900	—	
5	Franz Josef Hoop	1900–1912	—	
6	August Büchel	1912–1918	—	
7	Andreas Eberle	1918–1921	—	
8	Johann Büchel	1921–1930	CSVP	
9	Franz Xaver Hoop	1930–1939	FBP	
10	Josef Öhri	1939–1945	FBP	
11	Ernst Büchel	1945–1951	FBP	
12	Andreas Hoop	1951–1966	VU	
13	Hugo Öhri	1966–1983	FBP	
14	Anton Hoop	1983–1999	VU	
15	Jakob Büchel	1999–2007	VU	
16	Ernst Büchel	2007–2015	FBP	
17	Maria Kaiser-Eberle	2015–2023	FBP	
18	Christian Öhri	2023–	FBP	

== See also ==
- Eschen
