= Otmar Hasler cabinet =

Otmar Hasler cabinet may refer to:

- First Otmar Hasler cabinet (2001–2005)
- Second Otmar Hasler cabinet (2005–2009)

== See also ==
- Otmar Hasler
