= Marlies Amann-Marxer =

Liechtenstein politician

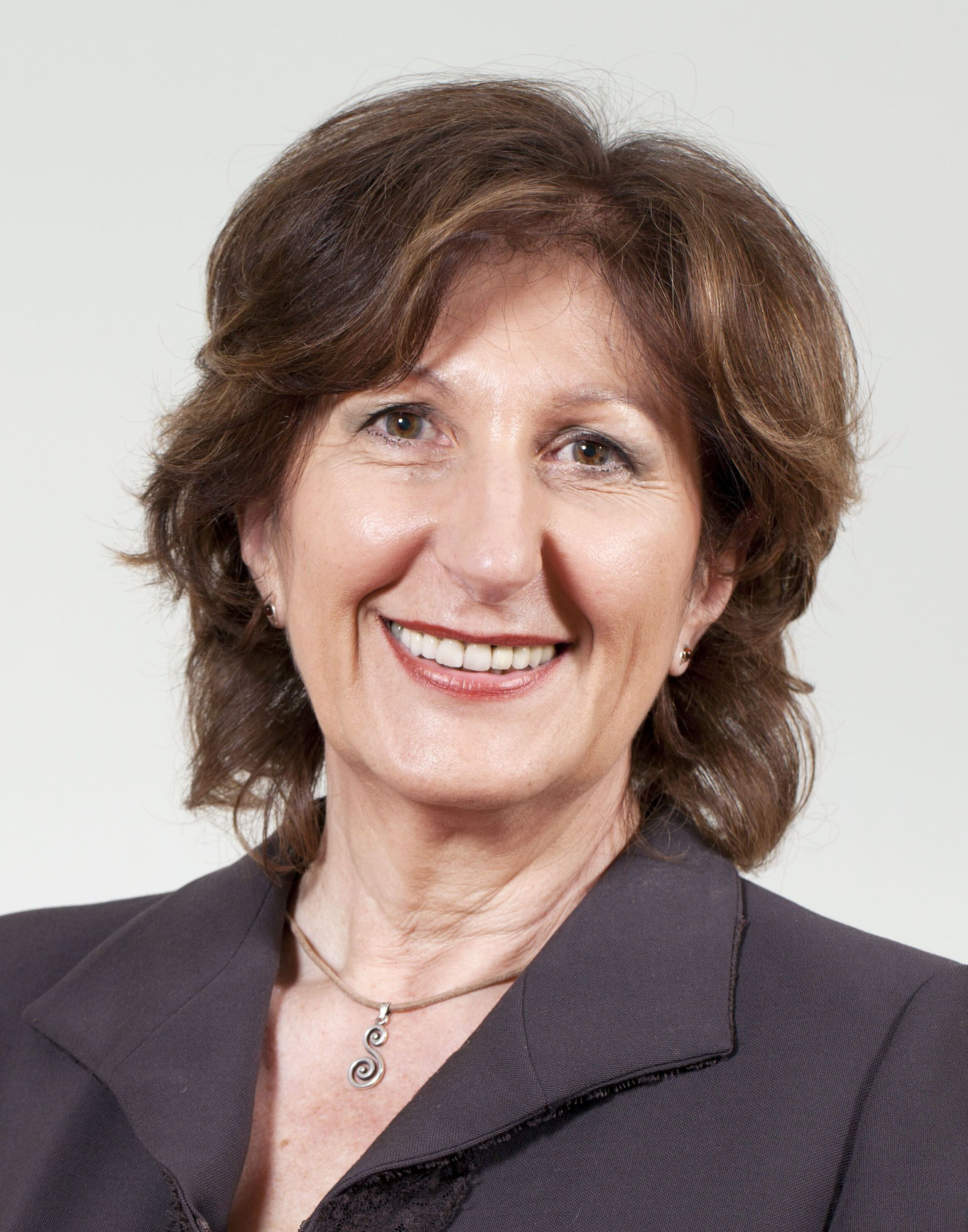
- Official portrait, 2013

Minister of Infrastructure, Environment, and Sport
- In office March 27, 2013 – March 30, 2017
- Monarch: Alois (Regent)
- Prime Minister: Adrian Hasler
- Preceded by: Renate Müssner
- Succeeded by: Daniel Risch

Personal details
- Born: July 31, 1952 (age 74) Vaduz, Liechtenstein
- Party: Patriotic Union
- Children: 4

Marlies Amann-Marxer (born July 31, 1952) (mother: Emma Marxer) is a politician from Liechtenstein who served as the former Minister of Infrastructure, Environment and Sport in the Government of the Principality of Liechtenstein until March 30, 2017.

Amann-Marxer is married, has four children, and lives together with her husband in Eschen.

== Career ==
Marlies Amann-Marxer went to St. Elizabeth Business School in Schaan, where, in 1969, she earned a trade-diploma. After that she travelled to Neuchâtel, Geneva and Torquay to learn the languages and for business trips. Additionally she worked from 1970 on in various commercial jobs at the National bank of Liechtenstein, the international steeltrading institute and the Pattchom Int. Eng. AG in Vaduz. From 1989 to 1995 she was employed in her husband's company, the Amann Architektur AG where she was working on human resources, accounting and finances. From 1993 to 2001, Amann-Marxer was a lay judge of the Liechtenstein Criminal Court, and from 1997 to 2003, a spare lay judge of the Administrative Court.

Amann-Marxer's first political office was the membership in various community-commissions as well as the election as a member of the local council of Eschen in 2000, where she was holding the portfolio for schools. In 2005, Amann-Marxer was elected to serve as a Member of Parliament in the Landtag, the parliament of Liechtenstein. After the 2013 parliamentary election, Amann-Marxer was appointed to serve under the new government Prime Minister Adrian Hasler as Minister of Infrastructure, Environment and Sport.

== Honours ==
- : Commander's cross of the Order of Merit of the Principality of Liechtenstein (08/06/2017).
