= Aurelia Frick =

Liechtensteiner politician (born 1975)

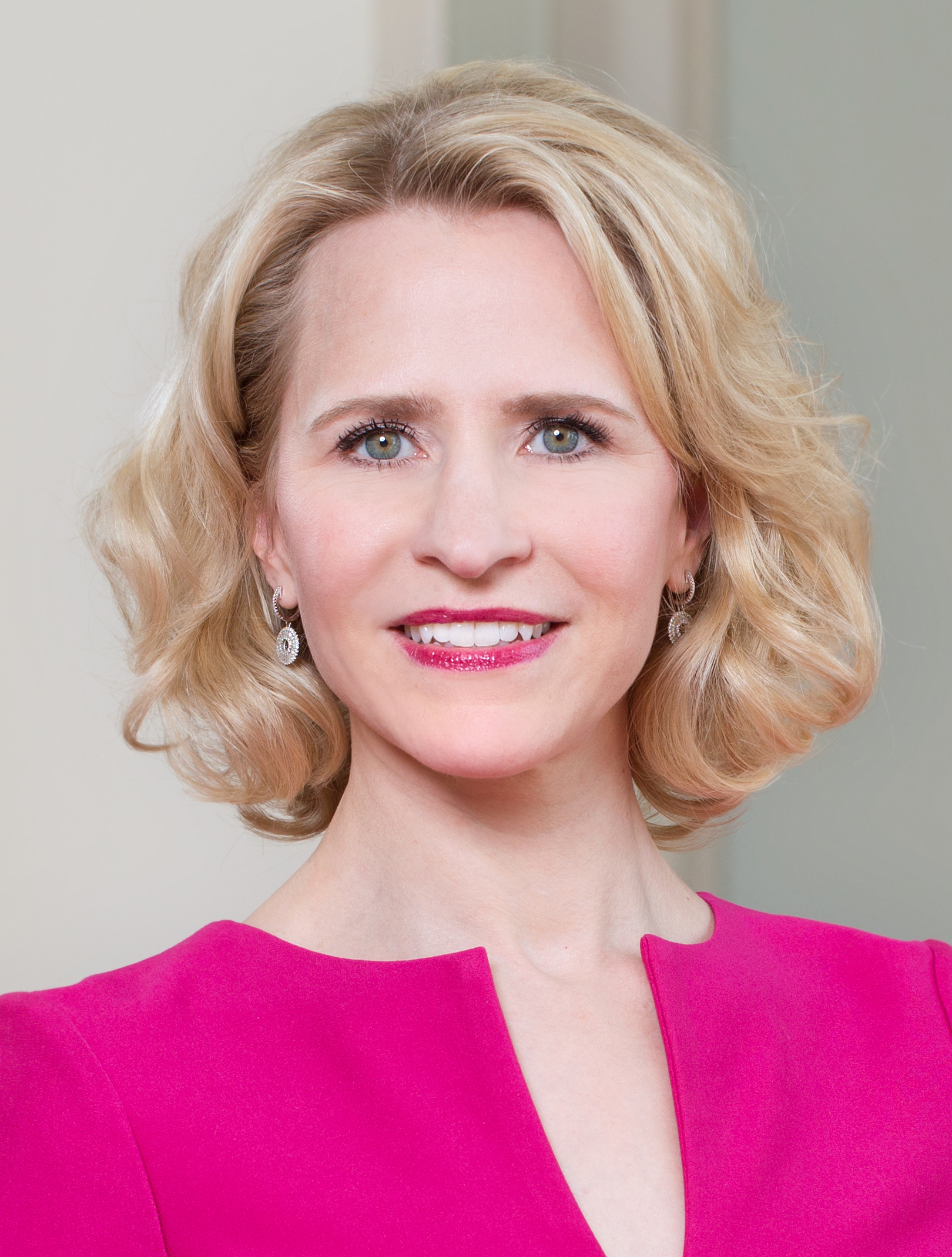
- Official portrait, 2017

Minister of Foreign Affairs, Education, and Culture
- In office 25 March 2009 – 2 July 2019
- Monarch: Alois (Regent)
- Prime Minister: Klaus Tschütscher; Adrian Hasler
- Preceded by: Rita Kieber-Beck
- Succeeded by: Katrin Eggenberger

Personal details
- Born: Aurelia Cäcilia Katharina Frick; 19 September 1975 (age 51) St. Gallen, Switzerland
- Party: Progressive Citizens' Party
- Spouse: Oliver Muggli (m. 2011)
- Children: 2
- Education: University of Fribourg; University of Basel

Aurelia Cäcilia Katharina Frick commonly known as Aurelia Frick (born 19 September 1975) is a Liechtensteiner politician who served as Minister of Foreign Affairs, Education and Culture of Liechtenstein from 2009 to 2019.

== Early life and education ==
Aurelia Frick was born in St. Gallen, Switzerland. From 1995 to 1999, Frick studied law at the University of Fribourg. She was admitted to the Bar of the Canton of Zürich in 2004. In 2005, she received her Doctor of Law from University of Basel.

== Career ==
Between 2001 and 2003 she was working as an auditor at the district court of Zurich in civil, labor, tenancy and criminal law. She received a doctorate from the University of Basel, with a thesis on "The Termination of the Mandate", and passed the bar examination in the Swiss Canton of Zurich. After graduation, Frick worked at a Zurich law firm, and then as legal director for a London-based human resources company. From November 2006 she worked as a consultant for Bjørn Johansson Associates, an executive search company. Part-time she was working as an associate professor at the University of Liechtenstein. She briefly worked for the hedge fund K2.

Frick has started her independent advisory practice, UNLOCK Advisory, in Vaduz after resignation as a minister.

== Political career ==
Frick, a member of the Progressive Citizens' Party in Liechtenstein (Fortschrittliche Bürgerpartei in Liechtenstein, or FBP), was at age 34 appointed to the ministerial justice, foreign affairs, and cultural affairs portfolios following the March 2009 parliamentary election in Liechtenstein in . Frick became one of Liechtenstein's five ministers in the Klaus Tschütscher cabinet, and one of two women in the cabinet. She was expected, on appointment, to pursue reforms of Liechtenstein's civil and criminal law.

After the 2013 parliamentary election, Frick was appointed to serve under the new government Prime Minister Adrian Hasler as head of the ministry of Foreign Affairs, Education and Culture.

=== Causa Frick ===
In 2019, Frick was subject to an embezzlement scandal where she was accused of misappropriating funds as a part of her duties. She refused to cooperate with the Landtag of Liechtenstein's audit commission, and on 2 July 2019 it passed a motion of no confidence against her, and she was expelled from her position. She was succeeded by Katrin Eggenberger.

== Personal life ==
In 2011, Frick married Oliver Muggli, a Swiss financier and former banker. Muggli is currently a partner of 1291 Private Office, a financial services company, based in Liechtenstein.

They have two children and reside in Vaduz.

== See also ==
- List of current foreign ministers

Political offices
Preceded by Rita Kieber-Beck	Minister of Foreign Affairs, Education and Culture; 2009–2019	Succeeded by Katrin Eggenberger
