= Adrian Hasler cabinet =

Adrian Hasler cabinet may refer to:

- First Adrian Hasler cabinet
- Second Adrian Hasler cabinet

== See also ==
- Adrian Hasler
