= Gisela Biedermann =

Liechtensteiner internist and politician (born 1948)

Member of the Landtag of Liechtenstein for Oberland
- In office 25 March 2009 – 27 March 2013

Personal details
- Born: 5 April 1948 (age 78) Alzey, Rhineland-Palatinate, Germany
- Party: Patriotic Union
- Spouse: Richard Biedermann (m. 1978; died 1995)
- Children: 3
- Education: University of Mainz; University of Freiburg

Gisela Biedermann (born 5 April 1948) is a German and Liechtensteiner physician and politician who served in the Landtag of Liechtenstein from 2009 until 2013.

== Biography ==
Gisela Biedermann was born on 5 April 1948 in the town of Alzey, Germany. Her father was a high school teacher. After completing her secondary education in the town in 1966, she began studying medicine at the University of Mainz and the University of Freiburg. In 1973, she received a Doctor of Medicine degree, and began working as a doctor in Germany and Switzerland. In 1978, she married Richard Biedermann, the head of the Liechtenstein Office for Social Services and brother to politician Manfred Biedermann. Later that year, the couple moved to the town of Schellenberg in Liechtenstein.

Biedermann received a specialization in internal medicine in 1983, and she established a medical practice in Vaduz. Throughout her career, Biedermann has held several prominent community positions. In 1986, she became a member of the Vaduz parish council, serving as its president from 1987 until 1995. She has also been a member of the board of directors of the Liechtenstein Elderly and Sick Aid, the Crisis Intervention Team, and Familienhilfe Vaduz. Biedermann has served as the president of the Liechtenstein Music School Foundation and the Vaduz Pregnancy Counseling Center, holding the latter position for over twenty years between 1986 and 2007.

In 2009, Biedermann moved to Vaduz and ran in that year's election for the Landtag of Liechtenstein. Standing in the Oberland constituency as a member of the Patriotic Union party, Biedermann was elected to parliament, receiving 4,264 votes (42.5%). She left office at the end of her term in 2013.

Since 1996, Biedermann has been a member of the board of directors of the Pastoral Forum for the Promotion of Churches, an organization which promotes religion in post-communist Eastern Europe, and currently serves as its vice chair.
