= Otmar Hasler =

Prime Minister of Liechtenstein from 2001 to 2009

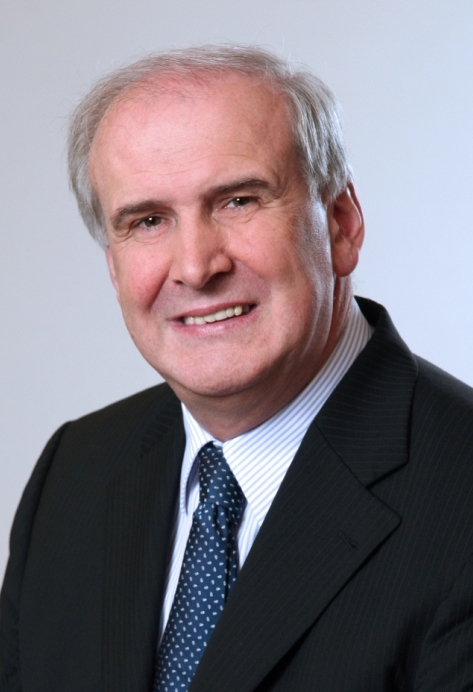
- Official portrait c. 2001–2009

Prime Minister of Liechtenstein
- In office 5 April 2001 – 25 March 2009
- Monarchs: Hans-Adam II; Alois (regent)
- Deputy: Rita Kieber-Beck (2001–2005); Klaus Tschütscher (2005–2009)
- Preceded by: Mario Frick
- Succeeded by: Klaus Tschütscher

President of the Landtag of Liechtenstein
- In office January 1995 – December 1995
- Monarch: Hans-Adam II
- Vice President: Paul Kindle
- Preceded by: Paul Kindle
- Succeeded by: Paul Kindle

Member of the Landtag of Liechtenstein for Unterland
- In office 5 March 1989 – 11 February 2001
Additional offices
President of the Progressive Citizens' Party
In office 1993–1995
Preceded by	Hansjörg Marxer
Succeeded by	Norbert Seeger

Personal details
- Born: 28 September 1953 (age 73) Vaduz, Liechtenstein
- Party: Progressive Citizens' Party
- Spouse: Traudi Hasler (m. 1985)
- Relations: Lorenz Hasler (brother)
- Children: 4

Otmar Hasler (German pronunciation: [ˈɔtmaʁ ˈhaslɐ]; born 28 September 1953) is a former politician from Liechtenstein who served as Prime Minister of Liechtenstein from 2001 to 2009. He was previously the President of the Landtag of Liechtenstein in 1995 and served in the Landtag from 1989 to 2001.

== Early life and career ==
Hasler attended school in Eschen from 1966 to 1969 and then teacher training college in Rickenbach, Schwyz from 1969 to 1974. He was educated in secondary school teaching from 1975 to 1979 at the University of Freiburg and University of Burgundy. He worked as a teacher at the secondary school in Eschen from 1979 to 2001.

Hasler was elected to the Landtag of Liechtenstein in 1989 as a member of the Progressive Citizens' Party, where he served until 2001. He was President of the Landtag of Liechtenstein from January to December 1995. In addition, he was president of the Progressive Citizens' Party from 1993 to 1995.

== Prime Minister of Liechtenstein ==
Hasler was Prime Minister of Liechtenstein from 5 April 2001 to 25 May 2009. His first term oversaw a FBP majority government, whereas in his second term he led a new coalition government with the Patriotic Union.

His government oversaw the ending of the 1999–2001 Liechtenstein financial crisis, with Liechtenstein being removed from the Financial Action Task Force's blacklist on 23 June 2001.

In 2003, a referendum to adopt Hans-Adam II's revision of the constitution of Liechtenstein to expand his powers passed. The prince had threatened to abdicate and leave the country if the referendum did not result in his favour. In the run-up to the referendum, Hasler supported the proposed changes.

=== 2008 tax affair ===
During Hasler's term, the 2008 Liechtenstein tax affair took place, where millions of euros belonging to hundreds of citizens living in Germany were channelled into the LGT Bank and other banks in Liechtenstein, taking advantage of Liechtenstein-based trusts to evade paying taxes in Germany. The affair overshadowed the previously-planned visit of Hasler to Berlin on 19 February 2008 to meet with the minister of finance, Peer Steinbrück, and the chancellor, Angela Merkel. Merkel asked for help in the investigation and cooperation in prevention of tax evasion, pointing out that Liechtenstein provided the US Internal Revenue Service with some data but not the German Ministry of Finances.

The newspaper Die Welt described the event as a "government crisis". As a result of the affair, Hasler's government entered negotiations with a number of countries to discuss tax avoidance issues.

Hasler sought re-election for a third term in the 2009 Liechtenstein general election. However, the election resulted in a victory for the Patriotic Union and Hasler resigned as prime minister on 8 February 2009, and was succeeded by Klaus Tschütscher on 25 March.

== Later life ==
Hasler currently serves as a member of the board at the Kaiser Partner Privatbank in Vaduz.

In 2023, Hasler was a co-founder of the Liacht foundation, designed to financially support charitable organisations. He has been a board member of the organisation since.

== See also ==
- Politics of Liechtenstein
- Otmar Hasler cabinet

Political offices
Preceded by Mario Frick	Prime Minister of Liechtenstein; 2001 – 2009	Succeeded by Klaus Tschütscher
