= Thomas Zwiefelhofer =

Deputy Prime Minister of Liechtenstein from 2013 to 2017

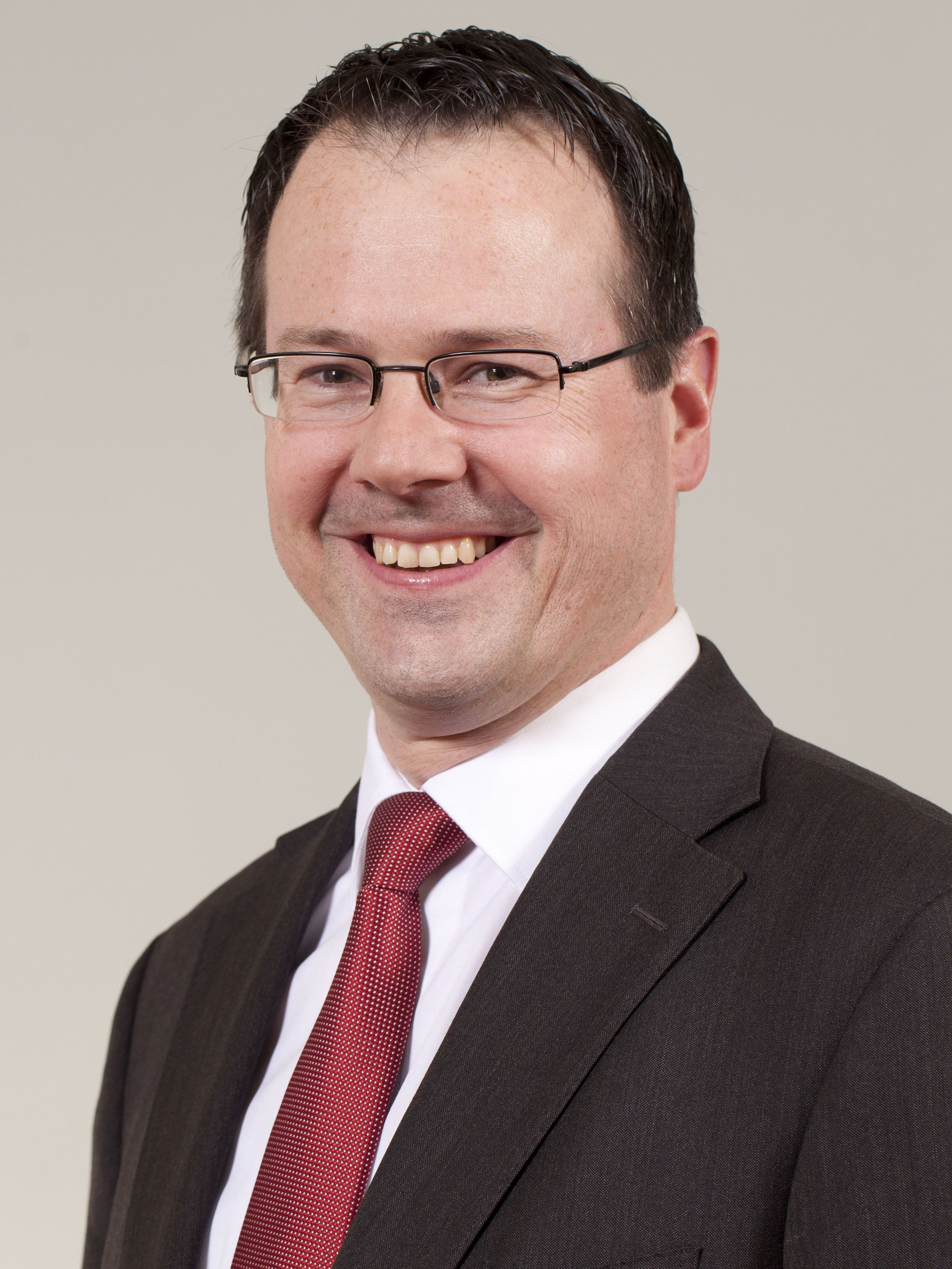
- Official portrait, 2013

Deputy Prime Minister of Liechtenstein
- In office 27 March 2013 – 30 March 2017
- Monarchs: Hans-Adam II; Alois (regent)
- Prime Minister: Adrian Hasler
- Preceded by: Martin Meyer
- Succeeded by: Daniel Risch

Personal details
- Born: 10 December 1969 (age 56) Grabs, Switzerland
- Party: Patriotic Union
- Spouse: Susanne Heeb (m. 1996)
- Children: 3

Military service
- Allegiance: Switzerland
- Branch/service: Army of Switzerland
- Years of service: 2001–2004
- Rank: Captain

Thomas Zwiefelhofer (German pronunciation: [ˈtoːmas ˈtsviːfl̩ˌhoːfɐ]; born 10 December 1969) is a politician from Liechtenstein who served as Deputy Prime Minister of Liechtenstein from 2013 to 2017, under the government of Adrian Hasler. A member of the Patriotic Union (VU), he served as the party's president from 2021 to 2026.

== Early life and career ==
Zwiefelhofer was born on 10 December 1969 in Grabs, Switzerland as the son of engineer Hanspeter Zwiefelhofer and the commercial clerk Christa (née Goop) as one of three children. He grew up in Schellenberg and attended school at the Liechtensteinisches Gymnasium. From 1989 he studied architecture at the Swiss Federal Institute of Technology, where he graduated with a diploma in 1995. He worked as an architect in Zurich from 1996 to 1998.

From 1998 to 2000 he studied law at the University of St. Gallen. From 2001 to 2004 he was the commander of a tank brigade in the Swiss Armed Forces, reaching the rank of captain.

He received a doctorate in law in 2007 and then worked as a lawyer and member of the management board of the Allgemeines Treuunternehmen in Vaduz until 2013. From 2007 to 2011 he was a member of the Vaduz municipal council as a member of the Patriotic Union (VU). From 2007 to 2013 he was the honorary consul of Poland in Liechtenstein.

== Deputy prime minister of Liechtenstein ==
Zwiefelhofer was the VU's candidate for Prime Minister of Liechtenstein in the 2013 elections. The election resulted in a win for the Progressive Citizens' Party (FBP), and Zwiefelhofer was became as Deputy Prime Minister of Liechtenstein on 27 March 2013 under the government of Adrian Hasler in a renewed coalition government between the two parties. Additionally, he was a government councillor with the roles of interior, justice and economy.

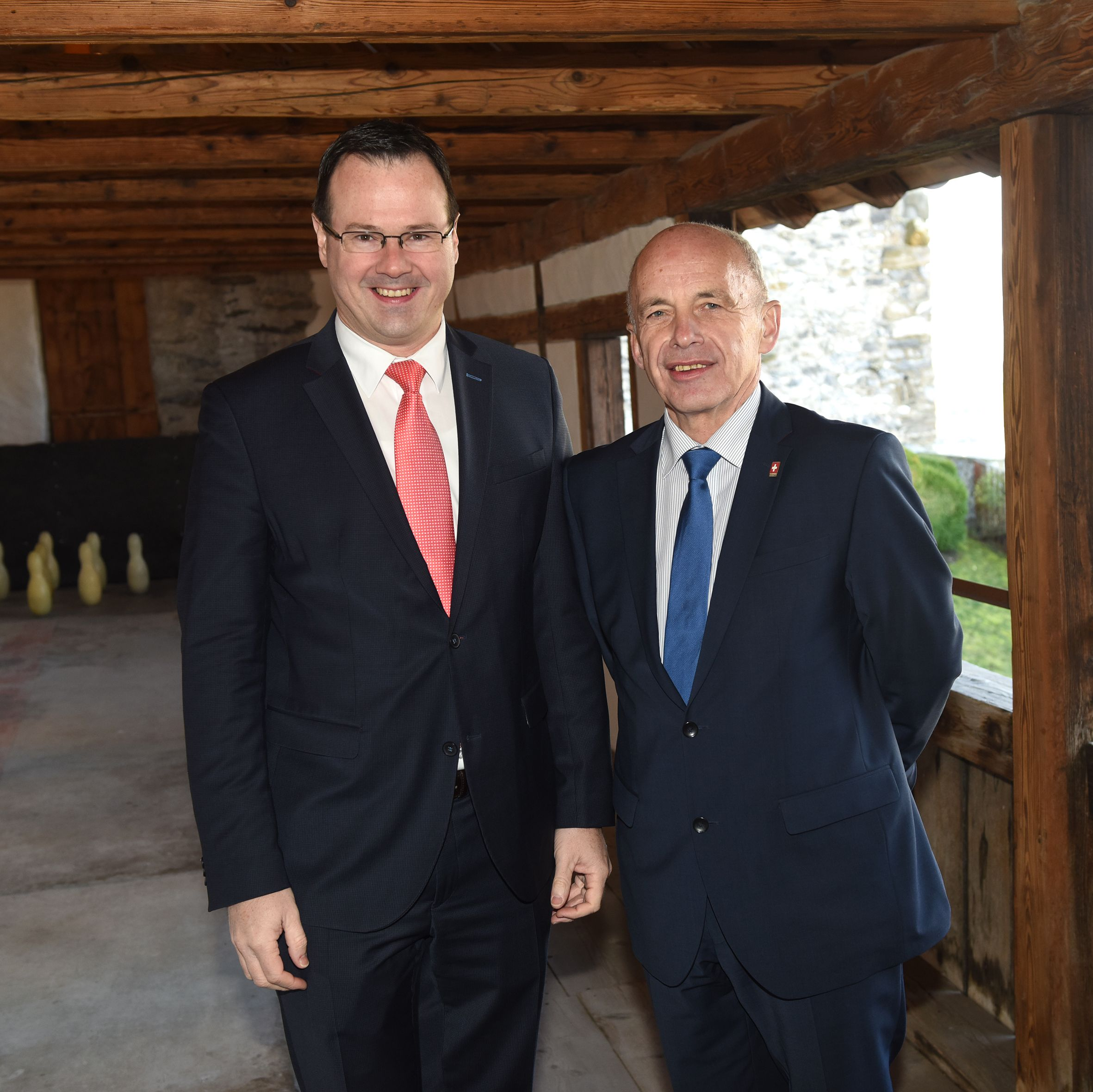
Zwiefelhofer (left) with Ueli Maurer in 2015

During his term in office, he as a part of the government was responsible for the establishment of an asylum task force, and then an amendment to the Liechtenstein asylum law in response to the 2015 European migrant crisis. It also included a revision of the gambling law in 2016 which allowed for the opening of casinos in Liechtenstein for the first time.

Zwiefelhofer was re-nominated as the VU's candidate for prime minister on 16 June 2016; the 2017 elections once again resulted in a win for the FBP. As a result, Zwiefelhofer resigned and was succeeded by Daniel Risch as deputy prime minister on 30 March 2017.

== Later life ==
Since 2018, Zwiefelhofer has been the honorary consul of the Czech Republic in Liechtenstein.

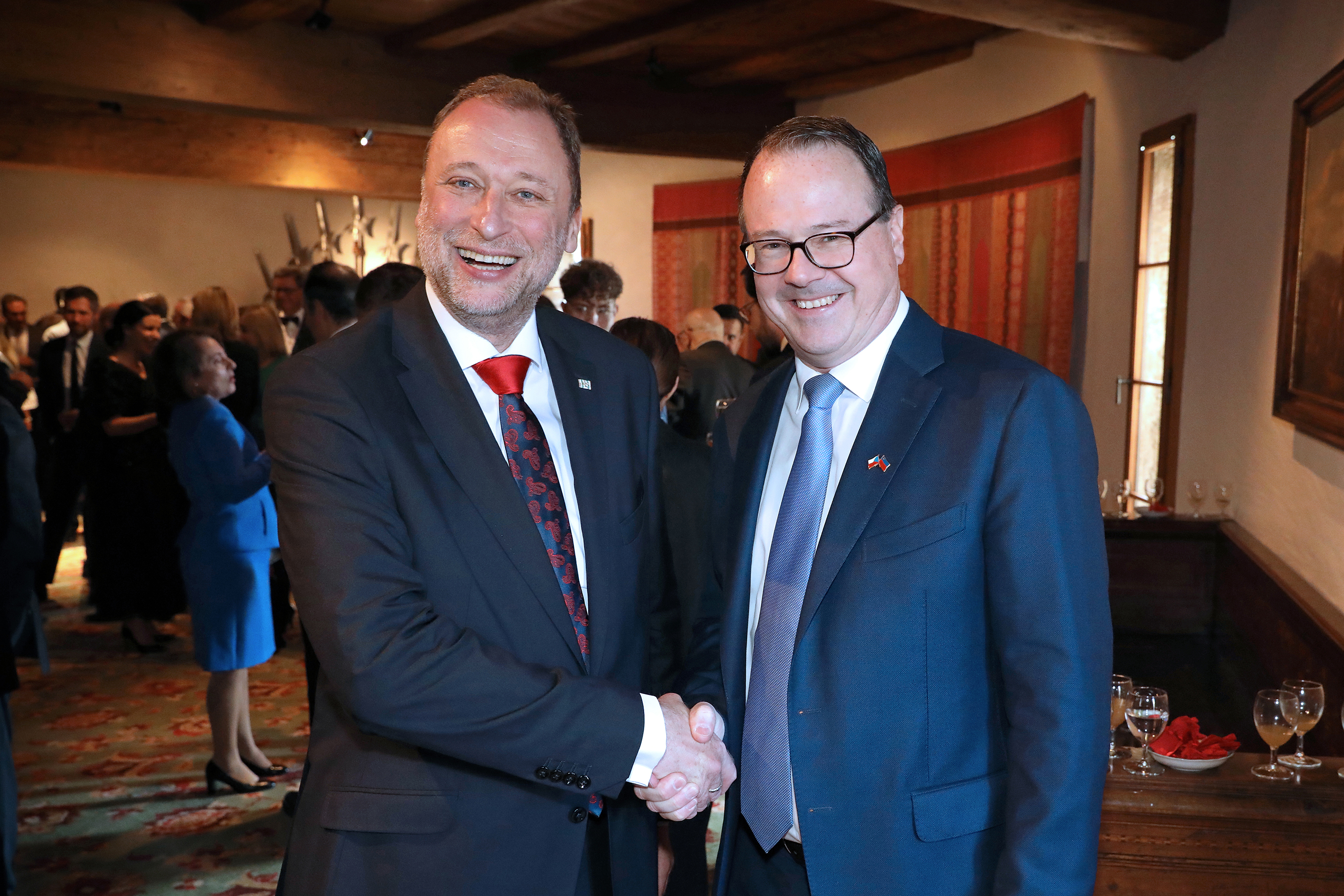
Zwiefelhofer (right) in 2025

He was a member of the board of directors of Vaduzer Medienhaus AG, the publisher of the Liechtensteiner Vaterland newspaper from 2021. He resigned from this position in 2024 as part of an effort to distance the newspaper from its connection to the Patriotic Union.

Since 2021, Zwiefelhofer has been the president of the VU, succeeding Günther Fritz. In 2024, he and the VU supported the privatization of Radio Liechtenstein in a referendum on the matter; notably against the positions of now-prime minister Daniel Risch or then-prime ministerial candidate Brigitte Haas. His presidency saw the party become the largest party in the Landtag of Liechtenstein in the 2025 elections. Despite being re-elected as president in June 2025, Zwiefelhofer announced his resignation in February 2026 and was succeeded by Mario Wohlwend on 24 June 2026.

== Personal life ==
Zwiefelhofer married Susanne Heeb on 27 September 1996 and they have three children together. He lives in Vaduz.

== Honours ==
- Austria: Grand Decoration of Honour in Gold with Sash for Services to the Republic of Austria (2017)
- Liechtenstein: Commander's Cross with Star of the Order of Merit of the Principality of Liechtenstein (2017)
