= Martin Meyer (Liechtenstein politician) =

Deputy Prime Minister of Liechtenstein from 2009 to 2013

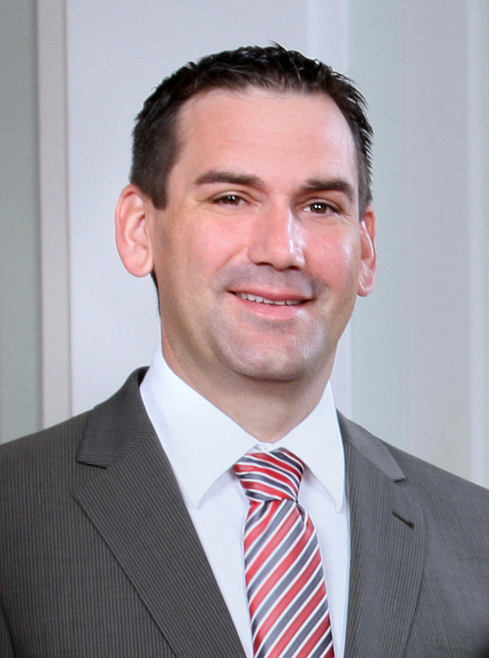
- Meyer in 2011

Deputy Prime Minister of Liechtenstein
- In office 25 March 2009 – 27 March 2013
- Monarchs: Hans-Adam II; Alois (regent)
- Prime Minister: Klaus Tschütscher
- Preceded by: Klaus Tschütscher
- Succeeded by: Thomas Zwiefelhofer

Personal details
- Born: 10 June 1972 (age 54) Grabs, Switzerland
- Party: Progressive Citizens' Party
- Spouse: Sabine Hasler (m. 2003)
- Children: 4

Martin Meyer (born 10 June 1972) is a politician from Liechtenstein who served as the Deputy Prime Minister of Liechtenstein from 2009 to 2013, under the government of Klaus Tschütscher. He additionally served as a government councillor from 2005 to 2013.

== Life ==
Meyer was born on 10 June 1972 in Grabs as the son of Bruno Meyer and teacher Margit Payer as one of three children. He attended secondary school at the Liechtenstein Gymnasium and then studied business administration at the University of Bern. From 1992 to 1996 he worked as a research assistant at the university. From 1999 to 2001 he worked as at VP Bank and then within the Liechtenstein government from 2001 to 2003. He was temporarily chief of the National Police from 2003 to 2004.

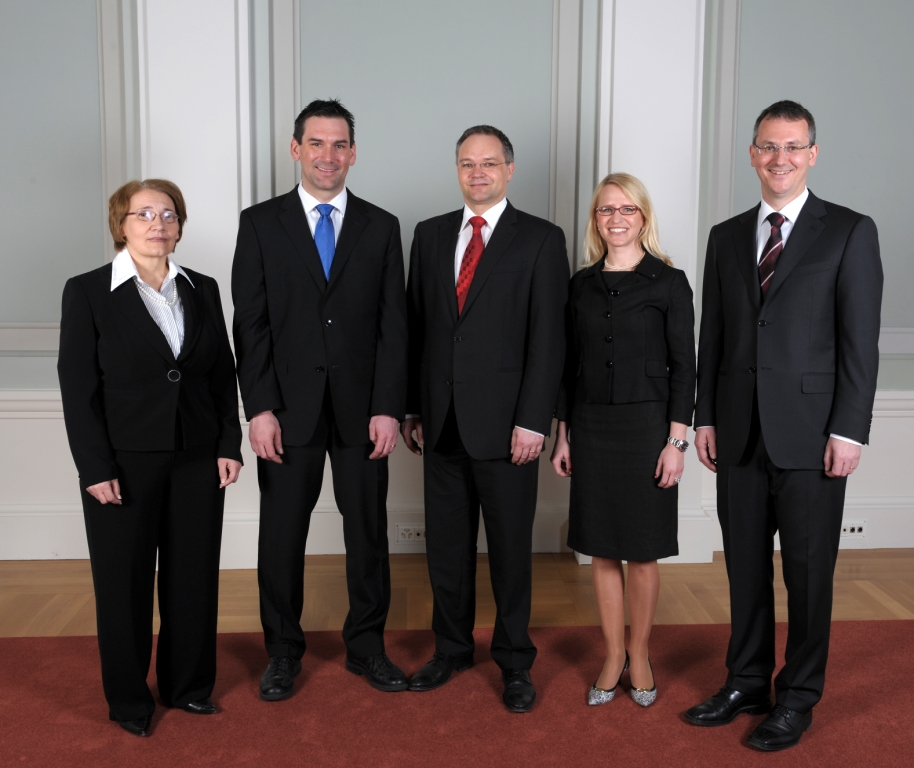
Meyer (centre-left) with the cabinet in 2009

On 25 March 2005 he was appointed as a government councillor in the second Otmar Hasler cabinet. in this position his roles were the interior, healthcare, transport and communication. Following the 2009 elections, he was appointed as Deputy Prime Minister of Liechtenstein on 25 March 2009, under the government of Klaus Tschütscher. Additionally, his roles were the economy, construction and transport. Meyer did not seek re-election in the 2013 elections was succeeded by Thomas Zwiefelhofer on 27 March 2013.

As of 2017, Meyer was the chairman of the management and member of the board of directors of ITW Ingenieurunternehmung AG in Balzers, and also at the Herbert Ospelt Institution. Since 2016, he has been the honorary consul of Germany in Liechtenstein.

Meyer married Sabine Hasler on 12 September 2003 and they have four children together. He lives in Gamprin.

== Honours ==
- Liechtenstein: Commander's Cross with Star of the Order of Merit of the Principality of Liechtenstein (2013)
