= Graziella Marok-Wachter =

Liechtensteiner politician

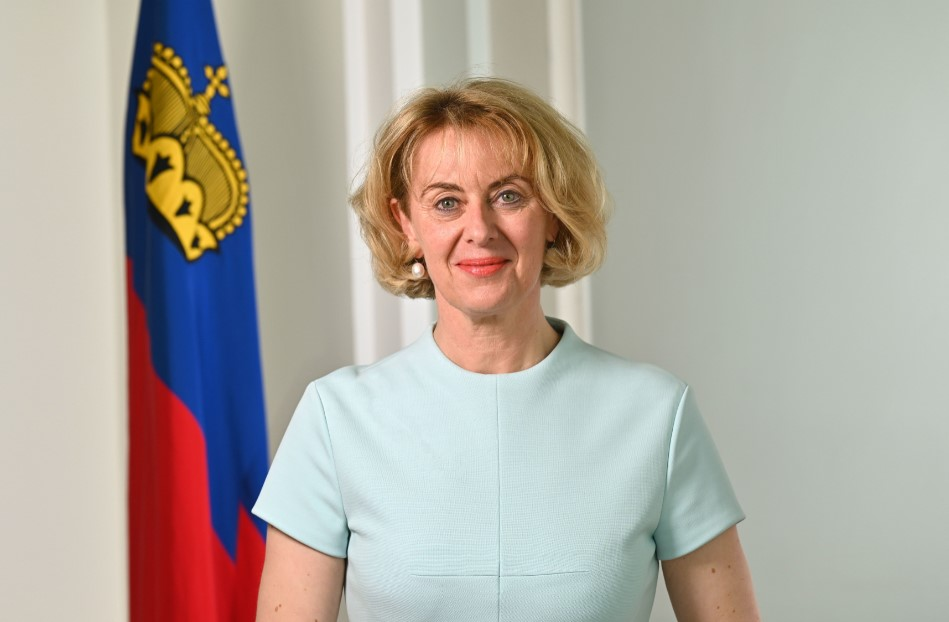
Graziella Marok-Wachter

Graziella Marok-Wachter (nee Marok; born 4 May 1965) is a Liechtensteiner politician from the Patriotic Union. She was a member of the government of the Principality of Liechtenstein from 25 March 2021 to 10 April 2025, responsible for the Ministry of Infrastructure and Justice.

== Biography ==
She was born in Mauren and graduated from Liechtensteinisches Gymnasium in 1985. She then began studying law at the University of Zurich, which she completed in 1991 with a licentiate. In 1994, she received her Doctor of Law degree from the University of Zurich with a thesis on private law in Liechtenstein, especially in start-up rights. In 1996, she was admitted to the Liechtenstein Bar, and afterward she worked as a partner in a law firm as an attorney until 2003. From 2003 to 2005 she then worked as Manager Director at Senat AG in Vaduz, alongside being proprietor of her own law firm until 2007. From 2007 to 2016, she was Head of Group Legal at Liechtensteinische Landesbank.

In April 2018, the government appointed Marok-Wachter as head of the Office of Justice in the Liechtenstein State Administration, succeeding Bernd Hammermann effective in November. She was, at the time, Head of Group Legal, Compliance & Tax at the Landesbank. In 2021 she became a member of the party presidium of the Patriotic Union.

In March 2021, Marok-Wachter became Minister of Infrastructure and Justice. During her time as minister, she has met with other Ministers of Justice, including Massimo Andrea Ugolini of San Marino.

== Personal life ==
She married Rudolf Wachter, a dental technician, in 1997, and they have two children. They currently live in Schaan.
