= Jakob Büchel =

Liechtenstein politician

- Born: 1955
- Occupation: Politician

Jakob Büchel (born 1955) is a politician from Liechtenstein and the former leader of the Patriotic Union (VU). Büchel was named leader of the VU on 26 September 2011 at a party convention in Balzers, to succeed then-leader Adolf Heeb.

Prior to his election as party leader, Büchel was active in municipal politics. He served as the Gemeindevorsteher (Mayor) of the municipality of Ruggell from 1999 to 2007. From 2008 to 2011 he was president of the Liechtenstein Sports Commission.

== Biography ==
Büchel grew up in a farming family with eight siblings. He completed a commercial apprenticeship at the Liechtensteinische Landesbank, then graduated with a federal banking diploma and attended management courses. From 1973 to 1999 he was employed by the LLB (from 1992 as Vice Director), and from 2008 to 2011 by the Office of Economic Affairs. Büchel was a member of the local council from 1987 to 1995 and was mayor of Ruggell from 1999 to 2007.

At the VU party congress in Balzers on September 26, 2011, Büchel was elected to succeed Adolf Heeb. From 2008 to 2011, he was president of the Liechtenstein Sports Commission. In November 2015, he was succeeded as party president by Günther Fritz.
