= Doris Beck (Liechtenstein politician) =

Liechtenstein businesswoman and politician (born 1961)

Member of the Landtag of Liechtenstein for Unterland
- In office 13 March 2005 – 3 February 2013

Personal details
- Born: Doris Büchel; 5 April 1961 (age 65) Ruggell, Liechtenstein
- Party: Patriotic Union
- Spouse: Richard Beck (m. 1987; div. 2007)
- Domestic partner: Christian (died 2020)
- Children: 3

Doris Beck (née Büchel; born 5 April 1961) is a businesswoman and politician from Liechtenstein who served in the Landtag of Liechtenstein from 2005 to 2013. A member of the Patriotic Union (VU), she served as the party's spokeswoman in the Landtag from 2005 to 2008, being the first woman to do so.

== Life ==
Doris Büchel was born on 5 April 1961 in Ruggell as the daughter of entrepreneur Eugen Büchel and Irma (née Wohlwend) as one of four children. She attended secondary school in Eschen before conducting an apprenticeship at the National Bank of Liechtenstein in Vaduz; in 1986 she received a Swiss Federal Certificate in business informatics, and in 2000 an executive MBA in business engineering from the University of St. Gallen (HSG) and the University of California, Berkeley.

From 1988 to 2001, Beck worked in various IT positions in LGT Group before founding and managing Financial Architectures AG, a business strategy and restructuring company based in Ruggell. She was a member of the board of directors of Liechtenstein Bus Anstalt, and then vice president Liechtenstein Association of Management Consultants from 2004 to 2013. From 2016 to 2024 she was the vice president of the board of directors of the Liechtensteinische Kraftwerke, and also the president of the board of trustees of the Liechtenstein National Museum from 2018 until her resignation in 2020.

Beck was a member of the Landtag of Liechtenstein from 2005 to 2013 as a member of the Patriotic Union (VU); she was also a member of the Landtag's state committee and the Liechtenstein delegation OSCE Parliamentary Assembly, heading the delegation from 2005 to 2008. She was the VU's spokeswoman in the Landtag from 2005 to 2008, being the first woman to hold such a role.

She married Richard Beck on 5 September 1987 and they had three children together; they divorced in 2007. Beck's partner Christian died in February 2020 and she published a book in 2023 based on experiences from her diaries from that time. She published another book in 2026.
