= Renate Müssner =

Liechtenstein government councillor (born 1957)

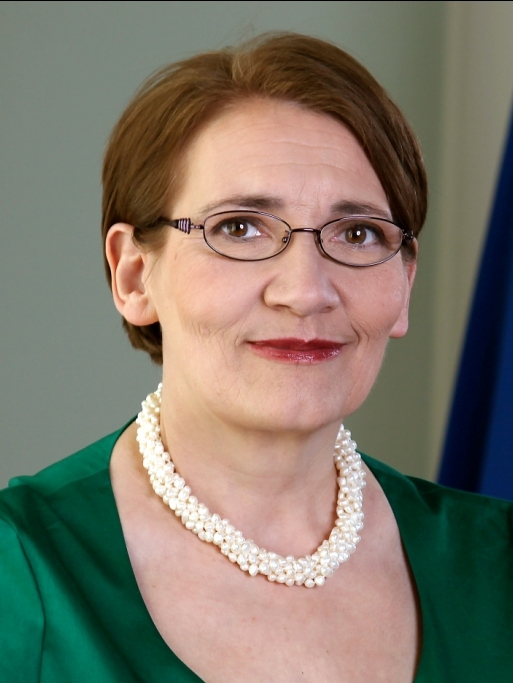
- Official portrait, 2011

Government councillor for Healthcare, Social affairs, Sport, Environment, Space, Agriculture and Forestry
- In office 25 March 2009 – 27 March 2013
- Prime Minister: Klaus Tschütscher
- Deputy: Andrea Klein

Personal details
- Born: 27 January 1957 (age 69) Eschen, Liechtenstein
- Party: Patriotic Union

Renate Müssner (born 27 January 1957) is a former politician from Liechtenstein who served as a government councillor from 2009 to 2013. Her roles were healthcare, social affairs, environment, space, agriculture, and forestry. Müssner was part of the Patriotic Union party (VU). She did not stand for re-election for a second four-year term after losing the support of the party president, and stepped down in 2013.

== Life ==
Müssner, the daughter of an insurance salesman, attended Feldkirch High School, and earned a doctorate in pharmacy in 1986 at the University of Innsbruck. She was the head of the preclinical department at Ivoclar in Schaan from 1986 to 2001, and then worked as a pharmaceutical chemistry consultant.

Müssner served as a government councillor from 2009 to 2013. Her roles were healthcare, social affairs, environment, space, agriculture, and forestry. During her term as councillor she presented plans for a new state hospital, saying the old building could be renovated but would still have problems, and a new building was a better long-term solution. However the loan proposals to fund the new hospital were rejected during a vote.

Müssner was part of the Patriotic Union party (VU). In 2012 she announced that she had indicated her willingness to run for election again to the VU party president, but had not received a reply. She therefore did not run for another four-year term, and stepped down the following year.

As of 2017, she has vice president of the Liechtenstein Patients' Organization since 2015.
