= Swisspartners Group =

swisspartners Group
- Industry: Wealth management and asset management
- Predecessor: swisspartners Group AG
- Founded: Switzerland (1993; 33 years ago)
- Founders: Martin P. Egli (†2023), Dirk van Riemsdijk (†2026) and Rainer Moser
- Headquarters: Zürich, Switzerland
- Number of locations: Zürich, Rapperswil, Vaduz
- Area served: Worldwide
- Number of employees: 100 (2026)
- Website: www.swisspartners.com

The swisspartners Group is a Swiss wealth management and asset management firm, comprising several legal entities. They have offices in Zurich, Rapperswil and Vaduz (Liechtenstein) . As of 2017 swisspartners was one of the largest independent investment management firms in Switzerland.

== History ==
Since its foundation in 1993, the swisspartners Group has stood for integral and customized financial advice. What began with three founding partners has developed into one of the largest independent financial service providers in Switzerland. In 1995, swisspartners Insurance Company was launched. The swisspartners Wealth Management AG was founded in 1997.

In 1998, swisspartners Investment Network AG opened a branch in Basel, Switzerland, which was closed in 2013. The swisspartners Versicherung AG was founded in 2002 and swisspartners AG was launched in 2003, both Liechtenstein based companies under the control of the Liechtensteinische Finanzmarktaufsicht FMA. The swisspartners Investment Network AG opened an additional subsidiary in 2003 in Geneva, Switzerland and in 2008 swisspartners Advisors Ltd. was founded.

Today, around 100 employees in Zurich, Rapperswil and Vaduz serve a variety of international private customers. Covering areas of asset management, fiduciary services and insurance solutions.

== Organization ==
swisspartners is an international financial services organization specializing in holistic financial management, including wealth management, fiduciary services, real estate solutions, and insurance. The firm provides tailored investment strategies based on diversified portfolio solutions and pursues an independent advisory approach by collaborating with selected custodian banks to ensure cost-efficient and client-focused outcomes. With offices in Zurich and Rapperswil (Switzerland), Vaduz (Liechtenstein), and Grand Cayman (Cayman Islands), Swisspartners serves a global clientele and emphasizes flexibility in cross-border financial services. The organization highlights its strong focus on personal client relationships, supported by an international network and more than 30 years of experience in the financial industry.

The swisspartners Group is active in three areas of business: asset management, life insurance and fiduciary services. The Liechtenstein-based swisspartners AG serves as a "EU-Passport", thus the company is allowed to perform asset management services in the European Union. swisspartners Advisors Ltd is registered with the SEC, therefore it is allowed to serve U.S. citizens.

== Expansion and acquisitions ==
In the course of its expansion, the swisspartners Group has completed several acquisitions. In 2023, the group acquired Decimo Immobilien AG, which was subsequently renamed swisspartners Immobilien AG in 2025. In March 2025, the swisspartners Group acquired Tell & Partner AG, an asset management and financial advisory firm. Following the acquisition, Tell & Partner AG was integrated into the swisspartners Group.
