= Adolf Heeb =

Liechtenstein cyclist (born 1940)

Personal details
- Born: 11 July 1940 (age 84); Ruggell, Liechtenstein
- Political party: Patriotic Union (Liechtenstein)

Adolf Heeb (born 11 July 1940) is a former cyclist and politician from Liechtenstein. He competed in the individual road race at the 1960 Summer Olympics. He later served as a deputy member of the Landtag of Liechtenstein and leader of the Patriotic Union party.
