= Rita Kieber-Beck =

Deputy Prime Minister of Liechtenstein from 2001 to 2005

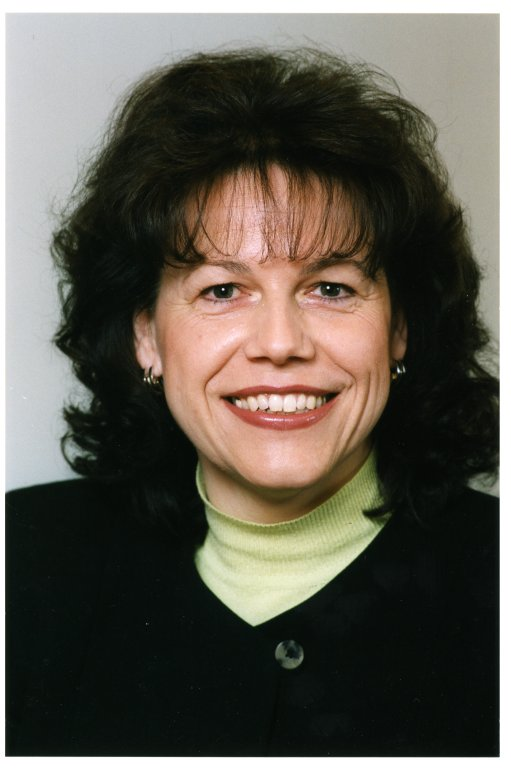
- Official portrait, 2005

Deputy Prime Minister of Liechtenstein
- In office 5 April 2001 – 21 April 2005
- Monarchs: Hans-Adam II; Alois (regent)
- Prime Minister: Otmar Hasler
- Preceded by: Michael Ritter
- Succeeded by: Klaus Tschütscher

Personal details
- Born: 27 December 1958 (age 67) Nenzing, Austria
- Party: Progressive Citizens' Party
- Spouse: Manfred Kieber (m. 1988)

Rita Kieber-Beck (born 27 December 1958) is a politician from Liechtenstein who served as the Deputy Prime Minister of Liechtenstein from 2005 to 2009. She is the first woman to hold the position. She was the minister of foreign affairs of Liechtenstein from 2005 to 2009.

== Life ==
Kieber-Beck trained as a secondary school natural sciences teacher, finishing in 1979, and then took additional training in geology and mineralogy from 1981 to 1982, at Freiburg im Breisgau. She then studied public accountancy and law. She worked as a teacher at Buchs vocational school and then at Balzers secondary school, where was headmistress from 1985 to 1988. Kieber-Beck was the managing director of the Liechtenstein Institute in Bendern for three years, from 1991. She was managing director of the Adiuvaris Treuunternehmen reg. in Triesen, and served on the board of the Liechtenstein Federal Council.

Kieber-Beck is a member of the Progressive Citizens' Party. She was elected as Deputy Prime Minister in 2001, and held the position until 2005. She was the first woman to hold the position. Kieber-Beck had responsibility for education, transport, communications and justice. From 2009, she was responsible for foreign affairs, culture and family and equal opportunities.

Kieber-Beck has been president of the Liechtenstein Secondary School Teachers' Association and the Liechtenstein University of Applied Sciences Council. Since leaving politics she has lectured in political management.

== Personal life ==
Kieber-Beck lives in Mauren. She married Manfred Kieber (born 24 November 1958) on 8 August 1988.

== Honours ==
- Liechtenstein: Commander's Cross with Star of the Order of Merit of the Principality of Liechtenstein (2003)
- Austria: Grand Decoration of Honour in Gold with Sash for Services to the Republic of Austria (2004)
