= Klaus Tschütscher =

Prime Minister of Liechtenstein from 2009 to 2013

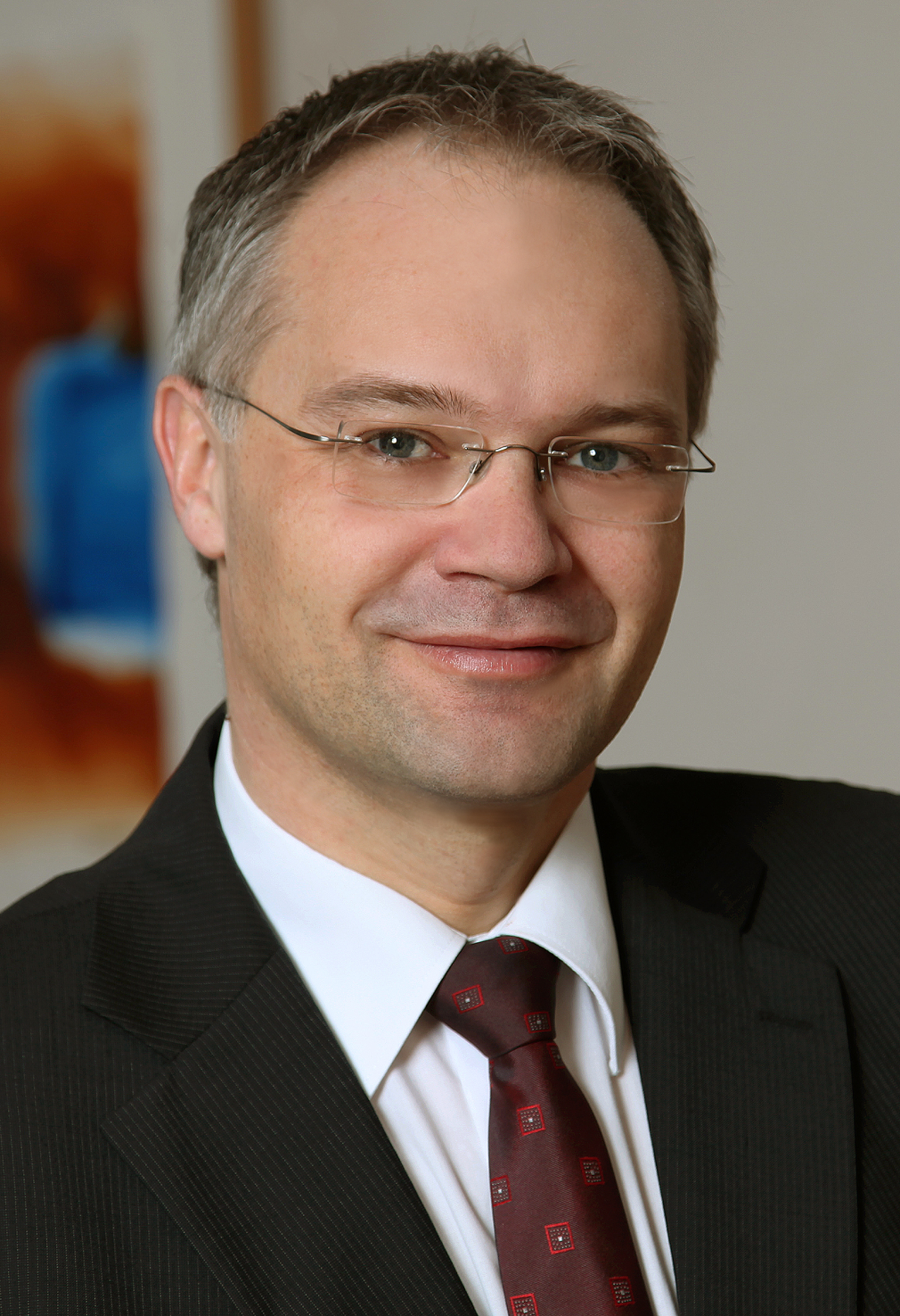
- Official portrait, 2009

Prime Minister of Liechtenstein
- In office 25 March 2009 – 27 March 2013
- Monarchs: Hans-Adam II; Alois (regent)
- Deputy: Martin Meyer
- Preceded by: Otmar Hasler
- Succeeded by: Adrian Hasler

Deputy Prime Minister of Liechtenstein
- In office 21 April 2005 – 25 March 2009
- Monarchs: Hans-Adam II; Alois (regent)
- Prime Minister: Otmar Hasler
- Preceded by: Rita Kieber-Beck
- Succeeded by: Martin Meyer

Personal details
- Born: 8 July 1967 (age 59) Grabs, Switzerland
- Party: Patriotic Union
- Spouse(s): Jeanette Eggenberger (m. 1994, divorced) Arzu Alanyurt (m. 2011)
- Children: 4

Klaus Tschütscher (German pronunciation: [ˈklaʊs ˈtʃʏtʃɐ]; born 8 July 1967) is a politician from Liechtenstein who served as the Prime Minister of Liechtenstein from 2009 to 2013. He previously served as Deputy Prime Minister of Liechtenstein from 2005 to 2009, under the government of Otmar Hasler.

== Early life and career ==
Tschütscher attended primary and secondary school in Vaduz. He then studied law at the University of St. Gallen from 1987 to 1993, where he received a diploma in 1996. He worked at the university as a research associate from 1993 to 1995.

He was head of the administrative department for legal services and economy at the Liechtenstein fiscal authority. Two months later he additionally became deputy director of the fiscal authority. From 1998 to 2005 Tschütscher taught avocationally as a part-time lecturer at the University of Liechtenstein. 2002 to 2005 he graduated once again in a Master of Law-postgraduate study on International Business Law at the University of Zurich.

== Prime Minister of Liechtenstein ==
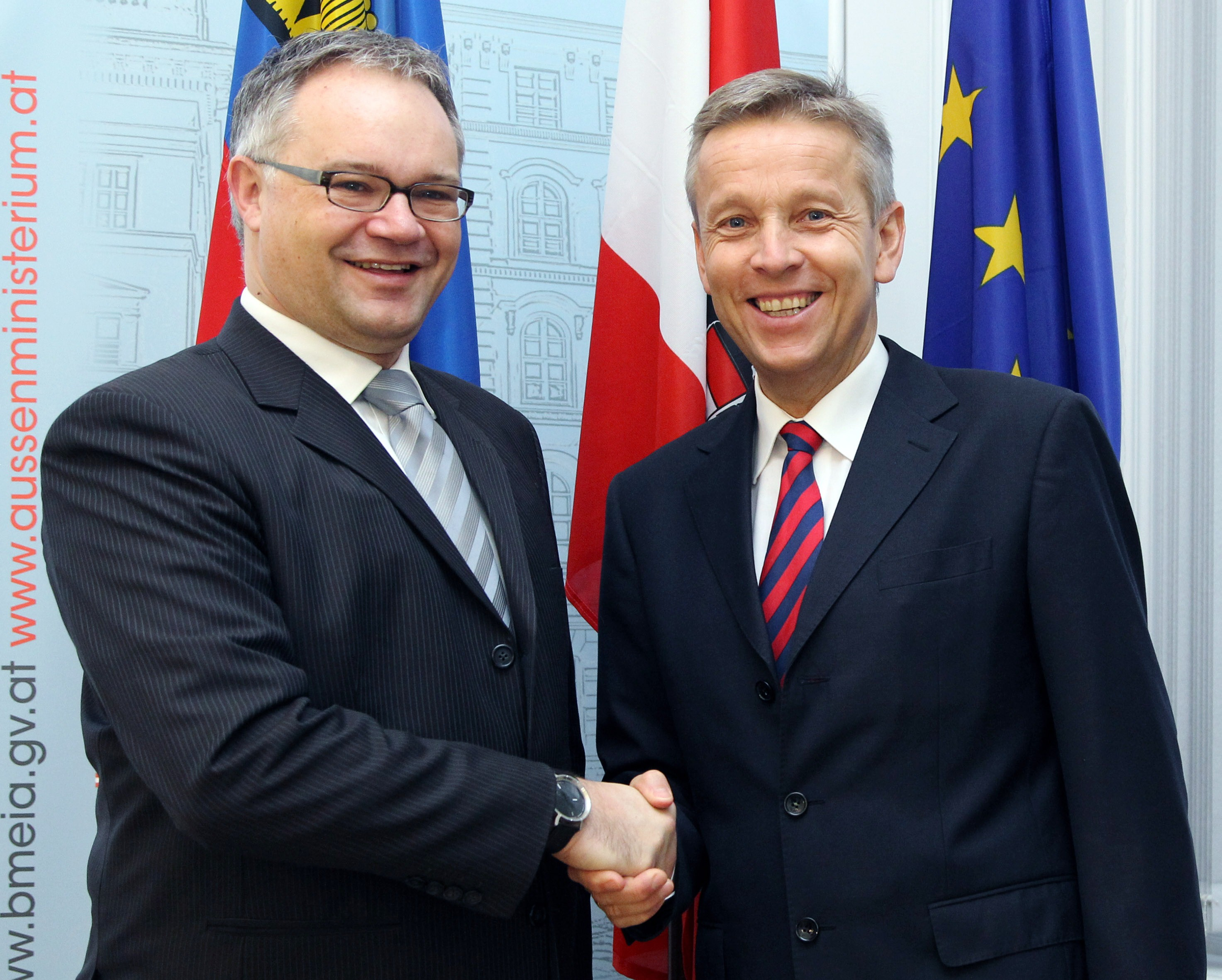
Tschütscher (left) with Reinhold Lopatka in January 2013

In the 2005 Liechtenstein general election the leading Progressive Citizens' Party lost the absolute majority and entered into a coalition government with the Patriotic Union. Tschütscher became Deputy Prime Minister of Liechtenstein in the government of Otmar Hasler. In this position his ministries were justice, economic affairs and sports.

The 2009 Liechtenstein general election resulted in a win for Patriotic Union and Tschütscher was appointed Prime Minister of Liechtenstein on 25 March 2009. His term in office was marked by an effort to move the country away from being a tax haven. In addition, it included the passing of a same-sex registered partnership law and Liechtenstein joining the Schengen Area in 2011.

Tschütscher did not stand for re-election in the 2013 Liechtenstein general election and was succeeded by Adrian Hasler on 27 March 2013.

== Later life ==
From 2014 he was Honorary Consul of Russia in Liechtenstein, which he resigned in the wake of the Russian invasion of Ukraine in February 2022. He was a board member of the University of Liechtenstein from 2018 to 2023.

Since 2024, Tschütscher has been the CEO of Grand Resort Bad Ragaz.

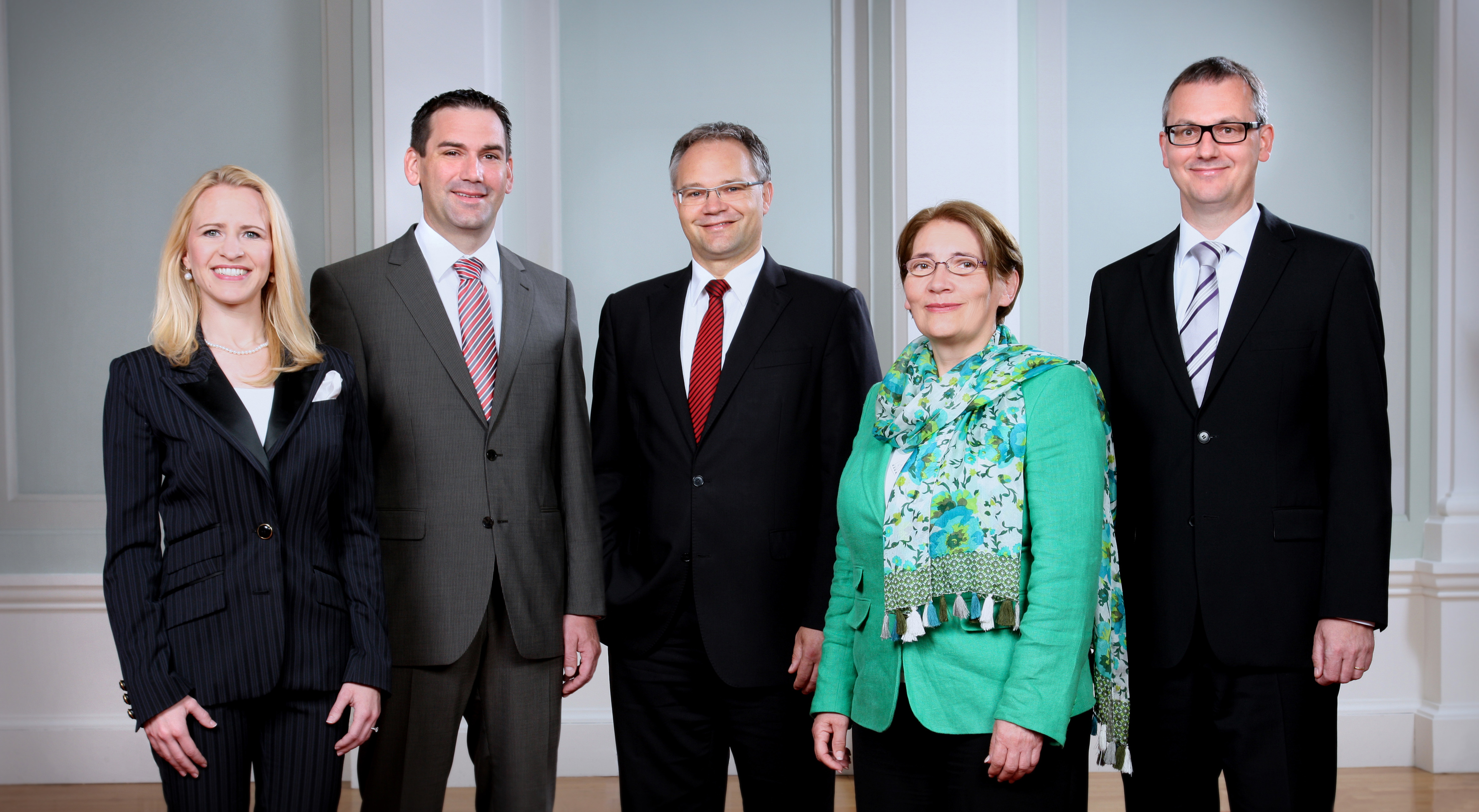
Tschütscher (centre) with his government in 2011

== Personal life ==
Tschütscher married Jeanette Eggenberger (born 25 January 1963) on 1 June 1994 and they had two children together, but got divorced at an unspecified time. He then went on to marry Arzu Alanyurt (born 16 October 1978), a Turkish Austrian, on 11 July 2011 and they have another two children together. He lives in Ruggell.

== Honours ==
- Austria : Grand Decoration of Honour in Gold with Sash for Services to the Republic of Austria (2011)

== See also ==
- Politics of Liechtenstein
- Klaus Tschütscher cabinet
