= List of banks in Liechtenstein =

This is a list of banks in Liechtenstein.

Name - official website - SWIFT Bank Identifier Code

== Major ==
- LGT Bank – BLFLLI2
- Liechtensteinische Landesbank AG / National Bank of Liechtenstein – LILALI2
- VP Bank AG – VPBVLI2

== Other active ==
- Bank Alpinum – SWIFT: N/A
- Bank Frick & Co. – BFRILI22
- BENDURA BANK AG – HYIBLI22
- EFG Bank von Ernst AG – EFGBLI22
- Kaiser Partner Privatbank – SERBLI22
- Mason Privatbank Liechtenstein – RAIBLI22XXX
- Neue Bank – NBANLI22
- SIGMA Bank AG – VOAGLI22XXX
- SIGMA KREDITBANK AG
- Union Bank – UNIVLI22

== Defunct ==
- Alpe Adria Privatbank AG (in Liquidation)
- Bank Vontobel
- Centrum Bank
- Banque Havilland

== See also ==
- List of banks in Europe
