= Adrian Hasler =

Prime Minister of Liechtenstein from 2013 to 2021

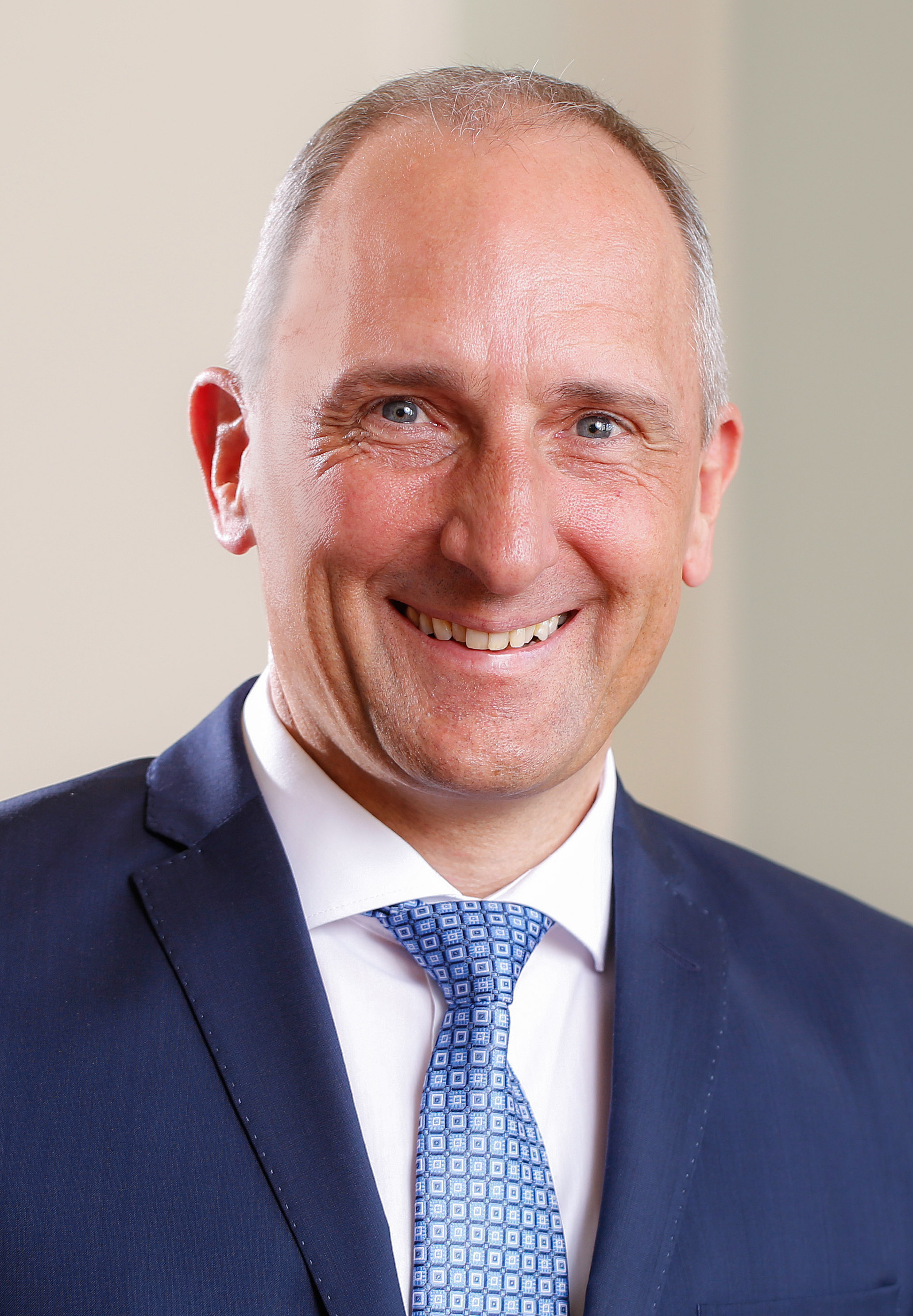
- Official portrait, 2017

Prime Minister of Liechtenstein
- In office 27 March 2013 – 25 March 2021
- Monarchs: Hans-Adam II; Alois (regent)
- Deputy: Thomas Zwiefelhofer (2013–2017); Daniel Risch (2017–2021)
- Preceded by: Klaus Tschütscher
- Succeeded by: Daniel Risch

Member of the Landtag of Liechtenstein for Oberland
- In office 11 February 2001 – 31 March 2004
- Succeeded by: Marco Ospelt

Personal details
- Born: 11 February 1964 (age 62) Vaduz, Liechtenstein
- Party: Progressive Citizens' Party
- Spouse: Gudrun Elkuch (m. 2003)
- Children: 2
- Adrian Hasler's voice Hasler speaks on his weekly schedule in an interview Recorded December 2018

Adrian Hasler (German pronunciation: [ˈaːdʁiaːn ˈhaslɐ]; born 11 February 1964) is an economist and politician from Liechtenstein who served as Prime Minister of Liechtenstein from 2013 to 2021. He previously served in the Landtag of Liechtenstein from 2001 to 2004.

== Early life and career ==
Born to Arthur and Liselotte Hasler, Adrian Hasler was raised in Vaduz, one of three sons. He earned his Matura, the general qualification for university entrance, in 1984 at the Liechtenstein secondary school in Vaduz. Subsequently, he started studying business administration with an area of expertise in finance and accounting at the University of St. Gallen, where he graduated in 1991.

Hasler worked as head of controlling in the business division Thin Films of Balzers AG. From 1996 until 2004, he was head of Group Finance and deputy-director of the Verwaltungs- und Privat-Bank in Vaduz.

In 2001, he was elected to the Landtag of Liechtenstein as a member of the Progressive Citizens' Party (FBP). He resigned this position on 31 March 2004 in order to become the chief of the Liechtenstein National Police, a position which he held until 2013.

== Prime Minister of Liechtenstein ==
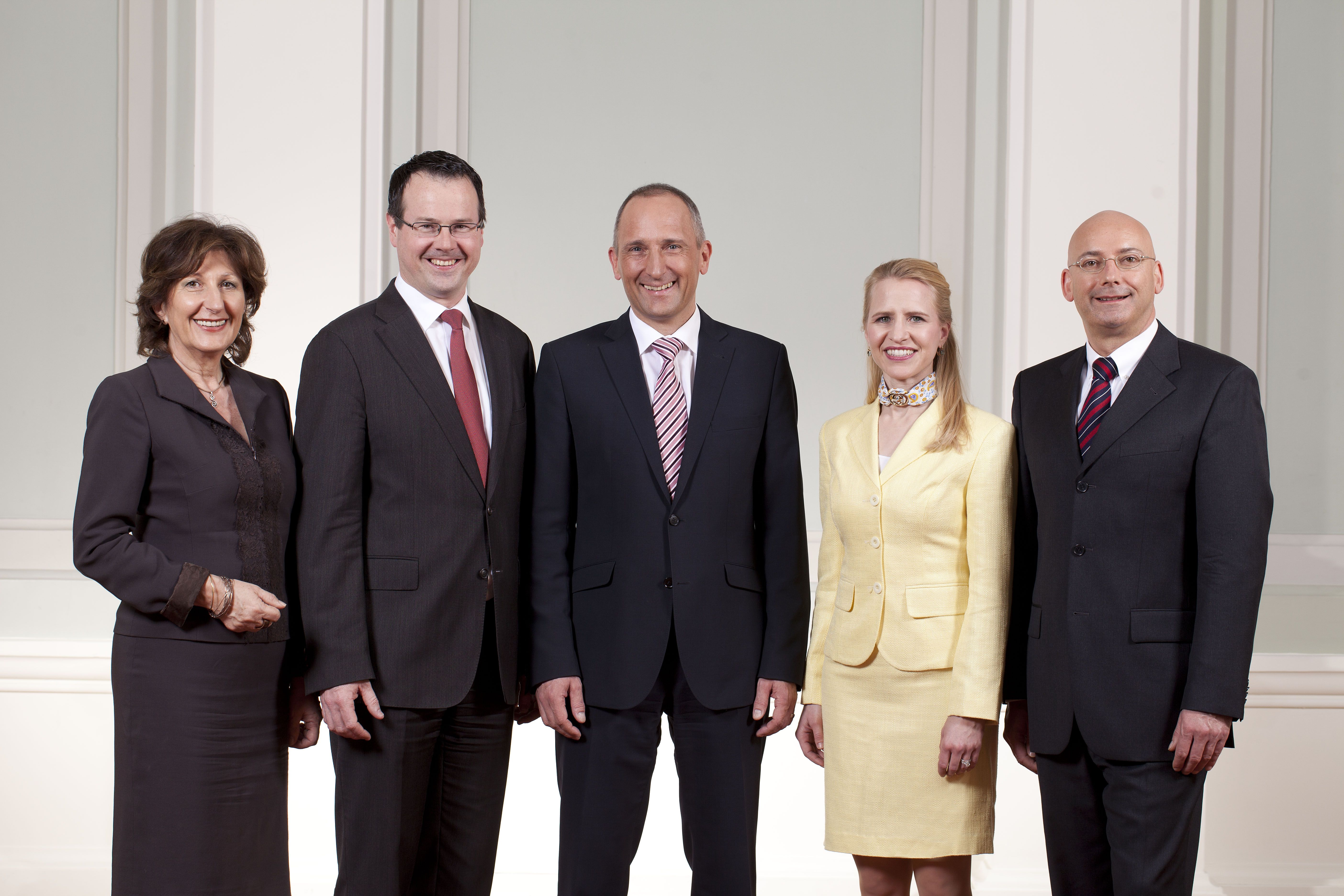
Hasler (centre) with his government in 2013.

Hasler was the thirteenth Prime Minister of Liechtenstein, from 27 March 2013 to 25 March 2021. The 2013 Liechtenstein general election resulted in a win for the FBP, and Hasler was appointed prime minister. He also occupied the roles of Minister of General Affairs and Finance.

During Hasler's tenure he worked on restructuring Liechtenstein's state budget, particularly from 2013 to 2016. His government also implemented controversial austerity programs. He continued and expanded the tax cooperation agreements that had been done by his predecessors following the 2008 Liechtenstein tax affair, signing tax agreements with numerous countries, such as Italy and Austria. Near the end of Hasler's tenure, he was faced with the challenge of the COVID-19 pandemic in Liechtenstein.

In addition, his government was responsible for the establishment of an asylum task force, and then an amendment to the Liechtenstein asylum law in response to the 2015 European migrant crisis. It also included a revision of the gambling law in 2016, which allowed for casinos to be opened in Liechtenstein for the first time.

Starting from early 2018, Hasler and Landtag member Johannes Kaiser began publicity attacking each other, which led to Kaiser leaving the FBP. The resignation left the FBP and VU with an equal amount of seats in the Landtag and caused discussions around the coalition agreement, but ultimately the coalition agreement between the two parties remained unchanged. Kaiser served as an independent member of the Landtag until 27 November 2019 where, upon his own request, he was readmitted into the party. Kaiser apologised for his actions and referred to them as a "mistake", and the issue was concluded by him shaking hands with Hasler.

On 27 May 2020, Hasler announced that he would not run for re-election in the 2021 Liechtenstein general election. He was succeeded by his deputy Daniel Risch on 25 March 2021.

== Later life ==
Since 2021, Hasler has been a member of the board of directors at Swisspartners Group in Vaduz. Since March 2024, Hasler has been the president of the board of directors of the old age and survivors insurance in Liechtenstein.

== Personal life ==
Hasler married Gudrun Elkuch (born 5 September 1973), a member of the Krisens Intervention Team in Liechtenstein, on 28 May 2003 and they have two children.

== See also ==
- Adrian Hasler cabinet
- Politics of Liechtenstein
