= Prime Minister of Liechtenstein =

Head of government

Prime Minister of the Principality of Liechtenstein
- Regierungschef
- Coat of arms of Liechtenstein

- Flag of Liechtenstein

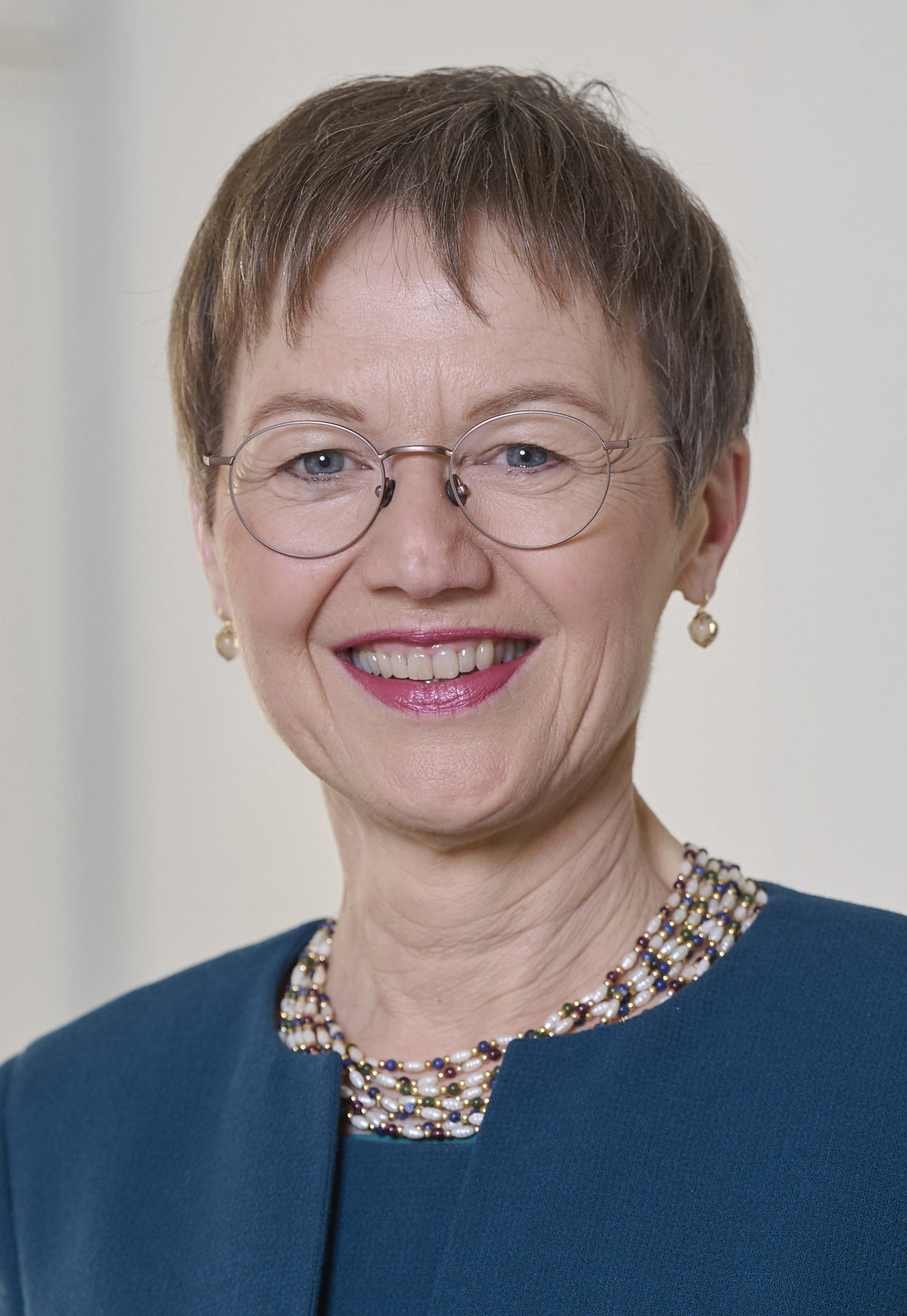
- Incumbent; Brigitte Haas since 10 April 2025
- Government of Liechtenstein
- Style: Prime Minister (informal); His/Her Excellency (diplomatic)
- Type: Head of government
- Member of: Cabinet of Liechtenstein
- Reports to: Prince of Liechtenstein; Landtag of Liechtenstein
- Appointer: Prince of Liechtenstein
- Term length: Four years, renewable
- Constituting instrument: Constitution of Liechtenstein
- Formation: 5 October 1921; 105 years ago
- First holder: Josef Ospelt
- Deputy: Deputy Prime Minister
- Salary: 254,000 Fr. annually
- Website: Official website

The head of government of Liechtenstein (German: Regierungschef von Liechtenstein), known informally as the prime minister, is the chief executive of the government of Liechtenstein and chairs the cabinet of Liechtenstein. As such, the prime minister is the most senior member of the government, responsible for chairing government meetings, signing official documents, advising the sovereign prince of Liechtenstein (royal prerogative) and represents the government externally.

The position originated as Landvogt in the 14th century, which evolved into the governor (Landesverweser) from 1848. The duties of the modern prime minister are outlined in the 1921 constitution, which established the office. Under this constitution, the prime minister is appointed by the sovereign prince of Liechtenstein with the consent of the Landtag of Liechtenstein (parliament) and are expected to command the confidence of both the prince and the Landtag. The appointed head of government is typically the leader of the political party with the most seats in the Landtag or a coalition of parties. The head of government cannot be a member of the Landtag at the same time, although they should meet the eligibility requirements for that office. The eligibility of the office also requires the holder to be natural-born in Liechtenstein. However, this requirement has been considered inactive since 1992.

As of 2025, a total of fifteen people have held the office of prime minister, with the first, Josef Ospelt, taking office upon in 1921. The incumbent prime minister Brigitte Haas, the first woman to hold the office, has been in office since 10 April 2025.

== Origins and history ==
The origins of the office of prime minister date back to the 14th century with the position of Landvogt in the County of Vaduz. The Landvogt was the head of the head of the district office (Oberamt) and acted as a representative of the sovereign prince of Liechtenstein, assisted by the rent master and land clerk. The position was considered the de facto head of the country due to the prince being almost always absent from the country; the first visit by a sovereign prince did not take place until 1842. As a concession following the Revolution of 1848 in Liechtenstein, the title was changed to governor (Landesverweser), although the position itself remained unchanged until the ratification of the 1862 Constitution of Liechtenstein on 26 September.

Under the 1862 constitution, the Oberamt was dissolved and replaced by the government of Liechtenstein, headed by the governor. The governor was appointed directly by the prince for an indefinite term without consultation from the newly-formed Landtag of Liechtenstein, but the Landtag held limited oversight on the government in matters such as state finances. The role marked a shift in the 1918 putsch when governor Leopold Freiherr von Imhof was forced to resign by the Landtag, at which point demands for a Liechtensteiner head of government were met.

In the 1921 constitution, the role of governor was replaced by that of prime minister. The prime minister was now appointed by the prince with the consent of the Landtag, and expected to command the confidence of both the prince and the Landtag. The eligibility of the office also now required that the holder be natural-born in Liechtenstein. The first office holder, Josef Ospelt, took office on 5 October 1921. Until 1965, the prime minister was appointed for a six-year term, unlike the rest of the government that served four years. In addition, until 1933 the prime minister was the only member of government who served on a full-time basis.

== Powers and authority ==
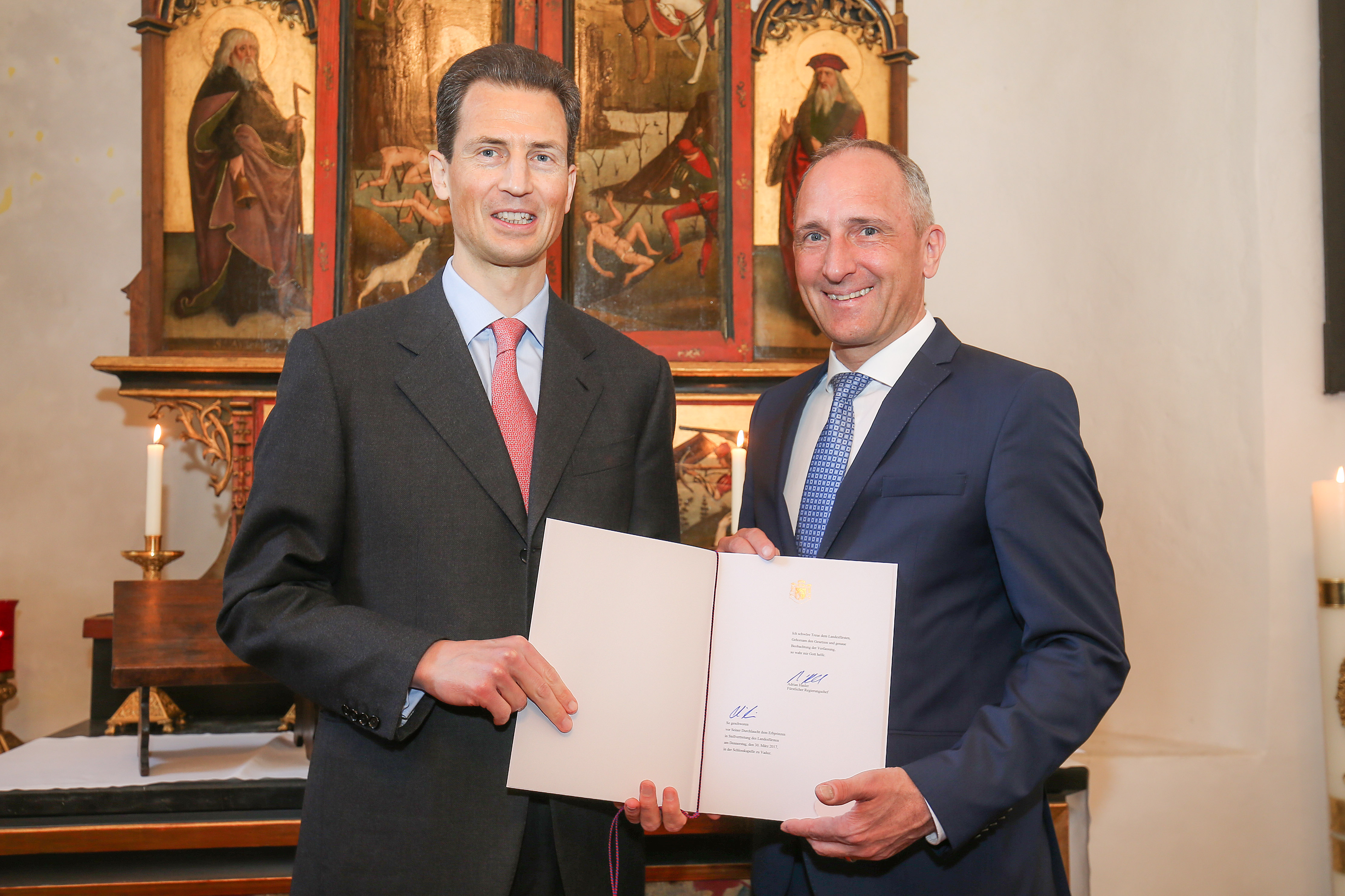
Prime minister Adrian Hasler receiving a government contract from Alois, Hereditary Prince of Liechtenstein in 2017

The prime minister is the chief executive of the government of Liechtenstein. They are one of five members appointed by the prince with the consent of the Landtag to form cabinet of Liechtenstein, which the prime minister chairs. The office holder is the most senior member of the government, responsible for chairing government meetings, signing official documents, advising the sovereign prince (royal prerogative) and representing the government externally. This is coincided by the prime minister also often holding important ministries such as the presidency and finance. In addition, the prime minister also was ex officio the foreign affairs minister until 1993.

The prime minister has the right to countersign princely decrees, and emergency decrees issued by the prince require the signature of the prime minister. The appointed head of government is typically the leader of the political party with the most seats in the Landtag or a coalition of parties. The prime minister cannot be a member of the Landtag at the same time, although they should meet the eligibility requirements for that office.

== See also ==
- List of heads of government of Liechtenstein
- Constitution of Liechtenstein
