= Patriotic Union (Liechtenstein) =

Patriotic Union Vaterländische Union
- Abbreviation: VU
- President: Mario Wohlwend
- Secretary: Michael Winkler
- Founded: 5 January 1936
- Merger of: Christian-Social People's Party; Liechtenstein Homeland Service
- Headquarters: Fürst-Franz-Josef-Strasse 13; FL-9490 Vaduz
- Newspaper: Liechtensteiner Vaterland
- Youth wing: Youth Union
- Women's wing: Women's Union
- Ideology: Conservatism; Liberal conservatism; Christian democracy; Economic liberalism; Constitutional monarchism
- Political position: Centre to centre-right
- European affiliation: ALDE–PACE (in the Council of Europe); European Democrat Union
- Colours: Red
- Landtag: 10 / 25
- Mayors: 7 / 11
- Municipal Councils^{a}: 43 / 104

Website
- vu-online.li
- Politics of Liechtenstein; Political parties; Elections; a. Municipal Councils = Number listed on respective website subtracted by number of elected mayors (who serve as members on their respective local councils, but are elected separately from other council members) as of 2 April 2023.

Logo until August 2024

The Patriotic Union (German: Vaterländische Union, lit. 'Fatherland Union', VU) is a liberal-conservative political party in Liechtenstein. The VU is one of the two major political parties in Liechtenstein, along with the monarchist-conservative Progressive Citizens' Party (FBP). The VU is the relatively more liberal of the two parties, supporting a constitutional monarchy and advocating for greater democratic governance. Since 2026, it is led by Mario Wohlwend and holds ten seats in the 25-member Landtag of Liechtenstein.

== History ==
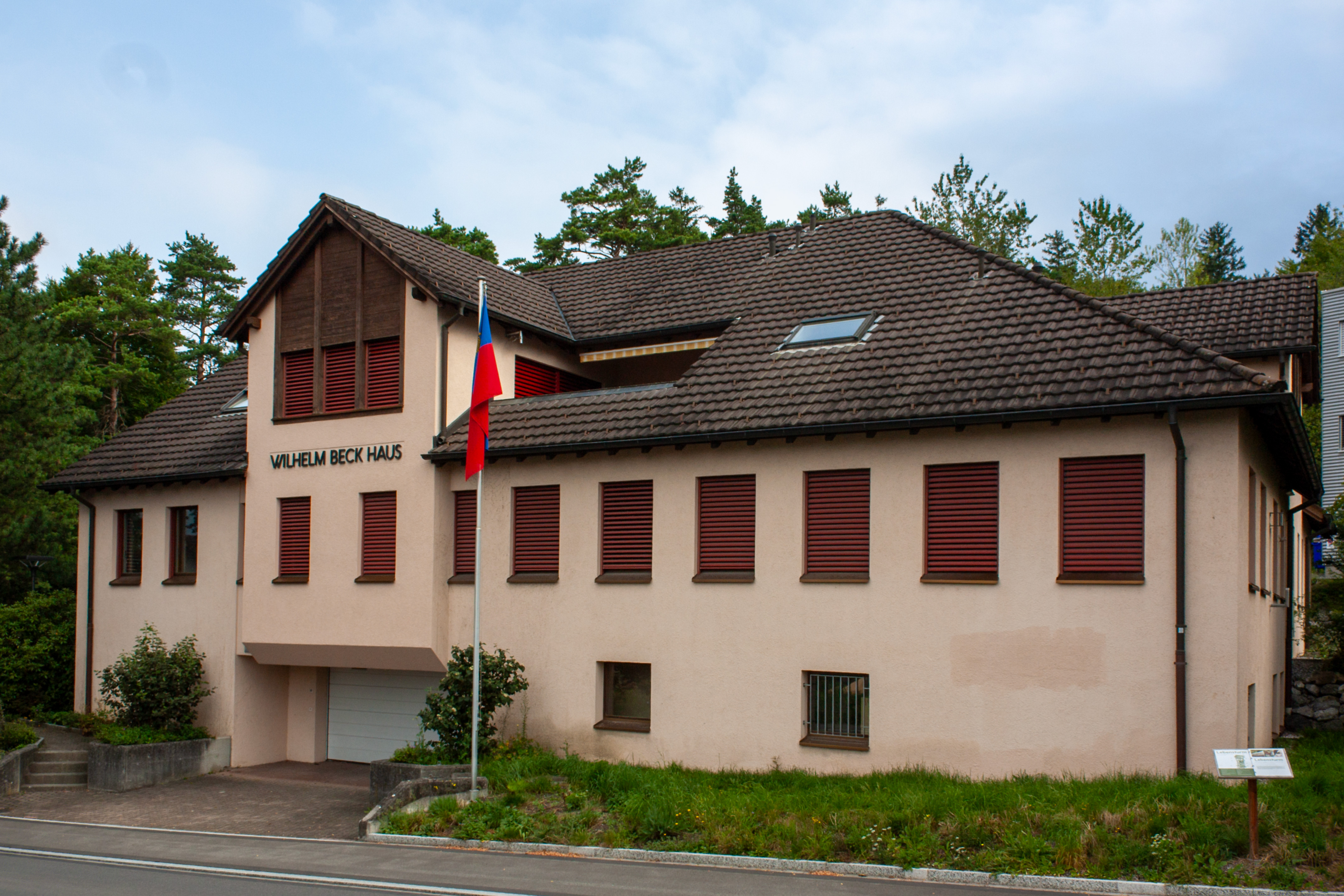
Wilhelm Beck house, the headquarters of the Patriotic Union

The Patriotic Union was formed by the 1936 merger of the Christian-Social People's Party (VP) with the minor party Liechtenstein Homeland Service (LHD). While the VP was the larger and more popular party, following the merger members of the LHD took prominent positions in the leadership of the new party.

After decades of being second to the Progressive Citizens' Party, the VU became the largest party in the Landtag for the first time as a result of the 1970 general elections. Although it lost the 1974 elections to the FBP, it won the 1978 elections and retained its Landtag majority until February 1993. However, early elections in October 1993 saw it regain its majority, which it held until 2001. After the 2005 state elections, which brought in an all-time low of votes, the VU provided 10 of the 25 deputies and was represented by Deputy Prime Minister Klaus Tschütscher and Hugo Quaderer in the five-member government. The VU emerged as the clear winner from the 2009 state elections and had an absolute majority in the state parliament for the 2009–2013 legislative period with 13 seats and provided the new head of government in the coalition government with the FBP. The Patriotic Union lost five seats in the state parliament in the 2013 state elections and was then represented with eight seats and provided two of the four government councillors. In the 2017 state election, the Patriotic Union was able to slightly increase its share of the vote by 0.2%, but still retained 8 of the 25 seats in the state parliament. In the 2021 state elections, the VU achieved 10 out of 25 mandates and recorded a 2.1% increase in votes compared to the 2017 state elections.

Currently, its member Daniel Risch is the head of government. Furthermore, the party also has two members (Dominique Hasler and Graziella Marok-Wachter) as government councillors.

== Ideology ==
The party is liberal-conservative but has members that are more socially conservative, especially when it comes to LGBT rights. It is also economically liberal, advocating a modern liberal market economy with a balanced budget.

== Election results ==
=== Landtag elections ===
Election	Leader	Votes	%	Seats	+/–	Rank	Status
1936	Otto Schaedler			4 / 15	New	▲2nd	Opposition
1939	Otto Schaedler			7 / 15	▲3	2nd	Coalition
1945	Otto Schaedler	1,285	45.28	7 / 15	Steady	2nd	Coalition
1949	Otto Schaedler	1,285	47.07	7 / 15	Steady	2nd	Coalition
Feb 1953	Otto Schaedler	1,229	42.60	7 / 15	Steady	2nd	Coalition
Jun 1953	Otto Schaedler	1,541	49.57	7 / 15	Steady	2nd	Coalition
1957	Otto Schaedler	1,537	47.64	7 / 15	Steady	2nd	Coalition
1958	Otto Schaedler	1,537	45.53	6 / 15	▼1	2nd	Coalition
1962	Otto Schaedler	1,448	42.73	7 / 15	▲1	2nd	Coalition
1966	Franz Nägele	1,581	42.79	7 / 15	Steady	2nd	Coalition
1970	Alfred Hilbe	2,008	49.57	8 / 15	▲1	▲1st	Coalition
1974	Alfred Hilbe	16,356	47.26	7 / 15	▼1	▼2nd	Coalition
1978	Hans Brunhart	18,244	49.15	8 / 15	▲1	▲1st	Coalition
1982	Hans Brunhart	20,997	53.47	8 / 15	Steady	1st	Coalition
1986	Hans Brunhart	46,793	50.19	8 / 15	Steady	1st	Coalition
1989	Hans Brunhart	75,417	47.15	13 / 25	▲5	1st	Coalition
Feb 1993	Hans Brunhart	73,217	45.43	11 / 25	▼2	▼2nd	Coalition
Oct 1993	Mario Frick	78,898	50.12	13 / 25	▲2	▲1st	Coalition
1997	Mario Frick	82,786	49.23	13 / 25	Steady	1st	Majority
2001	Mario Frick	76,402	41.35	11 / 25	▼2	▼2nd	Opposition
2005	Klaus Tschütscher	74,162	38.23	10 / 25	▼1	2nd	Coalition
2009	Klaus Tschütscher	95,219	47.61	13 / 25	▲3	▲1st	Coalition
2013	Thomas Zwiefelhofer	65,118	33.55	8 / 25	▼5	▼2nd	Coalition
2017	Thomas Zwiefelhofer	65,742	33.73	8 / 25	Steady	2nd	Coalition
2021	Daniel Risch	72,361	35.89	10 / 25	▲2	▲1st	Coalition
2025	Brigitte Haas	79,478	38.32	10 / 25	Steady	1st	Coalition

== Presidents ==
Years	Leader	Ref
1936–1965	Otto Schaedler	
1965–1974	Franz Nägele	
1974–1992	Otto Hasler	
1992–2001	Oswald Kranz	
2001–2005	Heinz Frommelt	
2005–2011	Adolf Heeb	
2011–2015	Jakob Büchel	
2015–2021	Günther Fritz	
2021–2026	Thomas Zwiefelhofer	
2026–present	Mario Wohlwend	

=== Landtag group speakers ===
Years	Leader
1953–1957	Ivo Beck
1966–1974	Roman Gassner
1974–1978	Herbert Kindle
1978–1982	Franz Beck
1982–1986	Georg Gstöhl
1986–1989	Hermann Hasler
1989–1993	Reinhard Walser
1993–1997	Peter Wolff
1997–2003	Peter Sprenger
2004	Hugo Quaderer
2005–2008	Doris Beck
2009–2013	Peter Hilti
2013–2017	Christoph Wenaweser
2017–2018	Violanda Lanter
2018–2020	Günter Vogt
2020–2025	Manfred Kaufmann
2025–	Dagmar Bühler-Nigsch
