= October 1993 Liechtenstein general election =

- 24 October 1993
- All 25 seats in the Landtag; 13 seats needed for a majority
- Turnout: 85.31% (▼2.23pp)
Party	Leader	Vote %	Seats	+/–
VU	Mario Frick	50.12	13	+2
FBP	Josef Biedermann	41.34	11	−1
FL	Executive committee	8.54	1	−1
This lists parties that won seats. See the complete results below.
Results by constituency
Prime Minister before	Prime Minister after
Markus Büchel; FBP	Mario Frick; VU

General elections were held in Liechtenstein on 24 October 1993 to elect the 25 members of the Landtag. Early elections were called following prime minister Markus Büchel being subject to a successful motion of no confidence at the request of his own party, the Progressive Citizens' Party (FBP). The Patriotic Union (VU) won a majority of thirteen seats, with the FBP winning eleven. The Free List (FL) won one seat. Voter turnout was 85.3%.

Josef Biedermann was the FBP's nomination for prime minister, while the VU nominated incumbent deputy prime minister, Mario Frick, for the position. Following the election, the VU and FBP formed a renewed coalition government, ultimately under the leadership of Frick. The new government was sworn in on 15 December 1993.

== Background ==
In the February 1993 elections, the Progressive Citizens' Party (FBP) won a plurality of twelve seats, whereas the Patriotic Union (VU) won eleven, and the Free List won one. As a result, the FBP and VU formed a coalition government, with Markus Büchel becoming prime minister.

By August 1993, Büchel came under significant controversy due to a controversial appointment to the head of the Liechtenstein tax administration. On 31 August, the FBP withdrew confidence in Büchel and publicly called for his resignation as prime minister; the party cited his poor performance in office, untruthfulness, and refusal to work with government colleagues as reasons for the loss in confidence. On 14 September, a FBP-initiated motion of no confidence in the Landtag against Büchel succeeded 17–8, thus the body requested his dismissal; Hans-Adam II, Prince of Liechtenstein coincided the dismissal of the government with dissolving the Landtag, and as such calling for new elections.

The decision to dissolve the Landtag was criticized by members of the VU and Free List, but Hans-Adam II justified the decision as necessary to resolve the political deadlock that had been created by the loss of confidence. Büchel was kept in office until a new government was elected, during which time he countersigned the Constitution of the Princely House of Liechtenstein, which had not been discussed in the Landtag.

== Electoral system ==
The 25 members of the Landtag were elected via open list proportional representation from two constituencies, Oberland with 15 seats and Unterland with 10 seats. Voters voted for a party list and then may have struck through candidates for whom they did not wish to cast a preferential vote, and may also have added names of candidates from other lists. The electoral threshold to win a seat was 8%. Landtag members sit for a four-year term. Once formed, the Landtag elected the prime minister and two government councillors who were then appointed by the reigning prince to govern in a cabinet. Voting was compulsory by law, and those who failed to vote without a valid reason may be fined, but it was not enforced. Citizens over 20 years of age who had been resident in the country for at least one month prior to election day were eligible to vote.

== Campaign ==
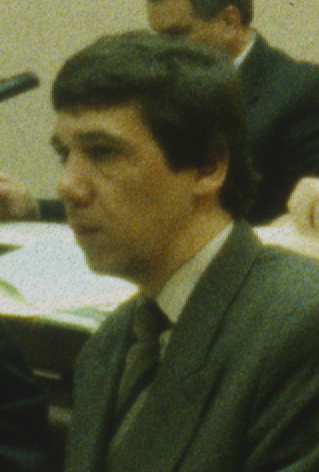
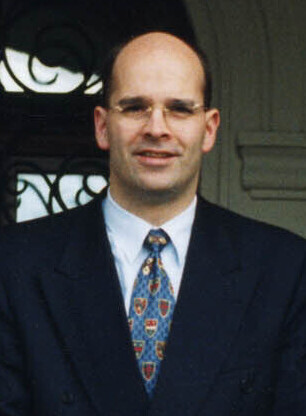
Josef Biedermann (left) and Mario Frick (right) were the FBP and VU's respective nominations for prime minister

The FBP nominated former Vice president of the Landtag Josef Biedermann for prime minister on 10 September 1993. Initially nominated as Büchel's replacement in the event of his removal as prime minister, Biedermann subsequently became the party's nomination for the position once early elections had been called, and his nomination was confirmed on 22 September. Additionally, the party nominated incumbent government councillors Kurt Korner and Cornelia Gassner as government candidates.

The VU nominated incumbent deputy prime minister Mario Frick for prime minister in late September 1993. Additionally, the party nominated incumbent government councillor Michael Ritter and Andrea Willi — the permeant representative of Liechtenstein to the European Free Trade Association — as government candidates.

The respective party programmes remained largely unchanged from the February 1993 election; both Frick and Biedermann held similar policies regarding the economy, European integration, and the revision of the Constitution of Liechtenstein following the 1992 constitutional crisis. In a debate on 17 October, the FBP defended its record and argued that withdrawing confidence in Büchel was a "win" for democracy and political accountability. Conversely, the VU put the affair into a negative light and stated that the party would restore stability.

The Free List presented its Landtag candidates on 30 September 1993, running a full list in the Oberland constituency. Similarly to the February election, the party renounced participation in government, but was open to it if the VU and FBP failed to form a coalition. The Non-Party List (ÜLL) did not participate in the election.

== Candidates ==
Candidates had the same eligibility criteria as voters. Political parties in Liechtenstein required the support of 30 voters from a constituency to be eligible to nominate a candidate list in it. A total of 69 candidates contested the election; 54 men and 15 women.

Oberland	FBP	VU	FL
Oberland	Peter Banzer; Alois Beck; Helga Beck-Meier; Christian Brunhart; Thomas Büchel; Reinold Bühler; Antonia Frick-Ospelt; Gebhard Hoch; Xaver Hoch; Guido Meier; Werner Ospelt; René Vogt; Dieter Walch; Ernst Walch; Klaus Wanger	Luzia Büchel-Sele; Norbert Bürzle; Alice Fehr-Heidegger; Walter Hartmann; Lorenz Heeb; Lorenz Jehle; Paul Kindle; Edith Maier-Vogt; Karlheinz Ospelt; Hans Quaderer; Volker Rheinbeger; Walter Schädler; Hubert Sele; Walter Vogt; Peter Wolff	Evelyne Bermann; Gerda Bicker-Brunhart; Claudia Heeb-Fleck; Christel Hilti-Kaufmann; Maria Madl-Sprenger; Hans Frommelt; Ludwig Frommelt; René Hasler; Konrad Kindle; Clemens Kaufmann; Clemens Laternser; Helmuth Marxer; Daniel Miescher; Josef Schädler; Paul Vogt
Unterland	FBP	VU	FL
Unterland	Josef Büchel; Otmar Hasler; Franz Hoop; Carl Kaiser; Elisabeth Kaufmann-Büchel; Rudolf Lampert; Gabriel Marxer; Johannes Matt; Michael Sochin; Renate Wohlwend	Manfred Biedermann; Otto Büchel; Hansjörg Goop; Egon Gstöhl; Ingrid Hassler-Gerner; Arnold Kind; Oswald Kranz; Donath Oehri; Theo Oehri; Walter Oehry	Ingrid Allaart-Batliner; Rosemarie Schädler-Matt; Wolfgang Marxer; Markus Büchel
Source: Liechtensteiner Volksblatt

== Results ==
The VU received 50.1% of the vote, a 4.7% increase from February 1993, and won a majority of thirteen seats. The FBP won 41.3%, a 2.9% decrease from February 1993, and won eleven seats. The Free List saw its vote share decrease from 10.4% to 8.5% from February 1993 and won one seat, at a decrease of one.

A total of 12,017 ballots were cast, resulting in a 85.3% voter turnout.

Party	Votes	%	Seats	+/–
Patriotic Union	78,898	50.12	13	+2
Progressive Citizens' Party	65,075	41.34	11	–1
Free List	13,447	8.54	1	–1
Total	157,420	100.00	25	0
Valid votes	11,799	98.19		
Invalid/blank votes	218	1.81		
Total votes	12,017	100.00		
Registered voters/turnout	14,086	85.31		
Source: Nohlen & Stöver

=== By electoral district ===
Electoral district	Seats	Party	Elected members	Substitutes	Votes	%	Seats
Oberland	15	Patriotic Union	Paul Kindle; Peter Wolff; Walter Hartmann; Norbert Bürzle; Karlheinz Ospelt; Hubert Sele; Lorenz Heeb; Volker Rheinberger	Walter Vogt; Hans Quaderer	60,440	51.09	8
Oberland	15	Progressive Citizens' Party	Xaver Hoch; Gebhard Hoch; Werner Ospelt; Alois Beck; Klaus Wanger; Thomas Büchel	Guido Meier; Ernst Walch	47,125	39.84	6
Oberland	15	Free List	Paul Vogt	Christel Hilti-Kaufmann	10,725	9.01	1
Unterland	10	Patriotic Union	Egon Gstöhl; Oswald Kranz; Manfred Biedermann; Otto Büchel; Ingrid Hassler-Gerner	Hansjörg Goop	18,460	47.18	5
Unterland	10	Progressive Citizens' Party	Otmar Hasler; Renate Wohlwend; Gabriel Marxer; Rudolf Lampert; Johannes Matt	Josef Büchel	17,951	45.88	5
Unterland	10	Free List	–	–	2,719	6.95	0
Source: Liechtensteiner Volksblatt

== Aftermath ==
Following the election, Biedermann resigned as a government candidate. The VU invited the FBP to begin negotiations for a coalition government, which the FBP accepted. Kurt Korner also did not participate in the new government. The nomination of a new government candidate was put up to a party election by the FBP; the subsequent selection process between Thomas Büchel and Hubert Büchel voted in favour of Thomas Büchel. The VU and FBP entered into a renewed coalition government, ultimately under the leadership of Frick. As the junior party in the coalition, Büchel became deputy prime minister. The new government was sworn in on 15 December 1993. Paul Kindle of the VU was elected as President of the Landtag upon the first session of the newly elected Landtag on 7 November 1993, with Otmar Hasler of the FBP as vice president.

== Bibliography ==
- Nohlen, Dieter; Stöver, Philip (2010). Elections in Europe: A data handbook. Nomos. ISBN 978-3-8329-5609-7.
- Marxer, Wilfried (2000). Wahlverhalten und Wahlmotive im Fürstentum Liechtenstein (PDF) (in German). Vaduz: Verlag der Liechtensteinischen Akademischen Gesellschaft. ISBN 3-7211-1044-7.
