= February 1993 Liechtenstein general election =

- 7 February 1993
- All 25 seats in the Landtag; 13 seats needed for a majority
- Turnout: 87.54% (▼3.34pp)
Party	Leader	Vote %	Seats	+/–
FBP	Markus Büchel	44.19	12	0
VU	Hans Brunhart	45.43	11	−2
FL	Executive committee	10.38	2	+2
This lists parties that won seats. See the complete results below.
Results by consistency
Prime Minister before	Prime Minister after
Hans Brunhart; VU	Markus Büchel; FBP

General elections were held in Liechtenstein on 7 February 1993 to elect the 25 members of the Landtag. The Progressive Citizens' Party (FBP) won a plurality of twelve seats, with the Patriotic Union (VU) winning eleven. The Free List (FL) won two seats, which was the first time a third party won seats in the Landtag. Voter turnout was 87.5%.

Incumbent prime minister, Hans Brunhart of the VU, sought re-election for a fifth term, while the FBP nominated Markus Büchel for the position. Following the election, Brunhart resigned, and the FBP and VU formed a renewed coalition government, ultimately under the leadership of Büchel. The new government was sworn in on 26 May 1993. However, after losing the confidence of his party, Büchel was the subject of a successful motion of no confidence in the Landtag in September, and fresh elections were held in October.

== Background ==
The 1989 elections had been called early due to the Kunsthaus case. In the election, Patriotic Union (VU) won a majority of thirteen seats, whereas the Progressive Citizens' Party (FBP) won twelve. As a result, the VU and FBP formed a coalition government, with Hans Brunhart continuing as prime minister.

Brunhart's fourth term in office was marked by a constitutional crisis regarding a referendum towards Liechtenstein's accession to the European Economic Area (EEA). Hans-Adam II, Prince of Liechtenstein, called for Liechtenstein's referendum to be held prior the corresponding referendum in Switzerland. This was against the countries' custom union and the wishes of the government and the Landtag. After a demonstration of approximately 2,000 people took place in the capital of Vaduz, Hans-Adam II and the government reached a compromise. Both parties agreed that the referendum would be held after the one in Switzerland, and they also affirmed that the government would commit to agreements with the EEA regardless the result in Switzerland. The subsequent referendum held in Liechtenstein in December 1992 was accepted by voters.

The crisis highlighted ambiguities in the constitution and started a debate around the prince's role in dismissing the government and the appointment of public officials. As such, in November 1992, the Landtag agreed that the constitution needed to be amended or interpreted precisely to clarify the prince's role.

== Electoral system ==
The 25 members of the Landtag were elected via open list proportional representation from two constituencies, Oberland with 15 seats and Unterland with 10 seats. Voters voted for a party list and then may have struck through candidates for whom they did not wish to cast a preferential vote, and may also have added names of candidates from other lists. The electoral threshold to win a seat was 8%. Landtag members sit for a four-year term. Once formed, the Landtag elected the prime minister and two government councillors who were then appointed by the reigning prince to govern in a cabinet. Voting was compulsory by law, and those who failed to vote without a valid reason may be fined, but it was not enforced. Citizens over 20 years of age who had been resident in the country for at least one month prior to election day were eligible to vote.

== Campaign ==
=== Main parties ===
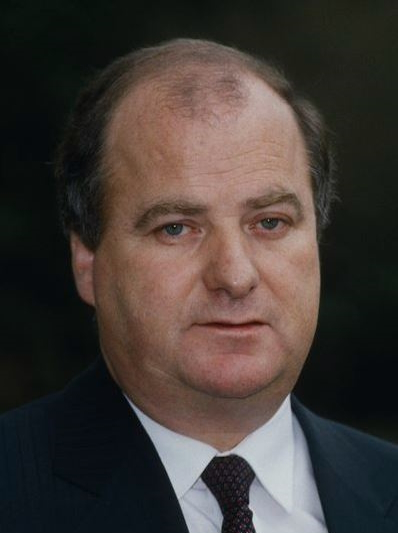
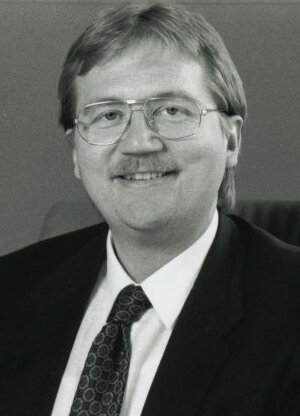
Hans Brunhart (left) and Markus Büchel (right) were the VU and FBP's respective nominations for prime minister

The VU re-nominated Brunhart for prime minister on 26 October 1993. In addition, the party nominated Reinhard Walser and Daniel Meier as government candidates. The party campaigned on political continuity and European integration; Brunhart expressed his support of continuing the coalition government with the FBP.

The FBP nominated lawyer Markus Büchel for prime minister on 23 September 1992. This nomination came after incumbent deputy prime minister Herbert Wille announced that he would not seek the position again. In addition, the party nominated Kurt Korner and Cornelia Gassner as government candidates on 22 January. Büchel stated that a coalition government would happen "under certain conditions".

Both the VU and FBP sought a majority in the Landtag. Major issues of the election included European integration, particularly with the EEA and the relationship with Switzerland. In a debate on 31 January 1993, Büchel argued that negotiations with Europe should have been conducted with more "force", and accused Brunhart of violating the constitution in regards to the 1992 constitutional crisis. In addition, he also argued for the reduction of spending. Conversely, Brunhart defended his record in the constitutional crisis, highlighted his achievements during negotiations for EEA membership, and how cooperation with the prince played a role in the successful referendum in regards to the country's EEA membership.

=== Opposition parties ===
The Free List presented its Landtag candidates in December 1992. A month prior, a Free List-initiated referendum to abolish the 8% threshold to win seats in the Landtag was rejected by voters by a significant margin. The party advocated for the legalisation of abortion and criticized the dependence on holding-company tax revenue in the Liechtenstein state budget; the party stated that it did not "fundamentally" seek participation in government, but was open to it if the VU and FBP failed to form a coalition. In that regard, the FBP did not rule out cooperation with the party.

The Non-Party List (ÜLL) did not participate in the election. According to Leo Sele, a spokesman from the party, the party's personnel situation prevented it from running. The ÜLL claimed that it had attempted to cooperate with the Free List, but failed due to opposition from the party.

== Candidates ==
Candidates had the same eligibility criteria as voters. Political parties in Liechtenstein required the support of 30 voters from a constituency to be eligible to nominate a candidate list in it. A total of 63 candidates contested the election: 50 men and 13 women.

Oberland	FBP	VU	FL
Oberland	Alois Beck; Christian Brunhart; Thomas Büchel; Roman Hermann; Xaver Hoch; Theo Jäger; Eugen Kranz; Guido Meier; Berthold Nägele; Werner Ospelt; Bruno Risch; Martha Tschikof-Bühler; David Vogt; Dieter Walch; Ernst Walch	Norbert Bürzle; Alice Fehr-Heidegger; Kuno Frick; Walter Hartmann; Lorenz Heeb; Paul Kindle; Karlheinz Ospelt; Ruth Ospelt-Beck; Volker Rheinberger; Monika Rohrer-Nutt; Alfons Schädler; Walter Schädler; Xaver Schädler; Peter Wolff	Evelyne Bermann; Claudia Heeb-Fleck; Christel Hilti-Kaufmann; René Hasler; Hilmar Hoch; Konrad Kindle; Clemens Laternser; Nikolaus Ruther; Paul Vogt
Unterland	FBP	VU	FL
Unterland	Toni Batliner; Josef Büchel; Otmar Hasler; Anton Heeb; Franz Hoop; Carl Kaiser; Gabriel Marxer; Gebhard Näscher; Martha Spiegel-Oehri; Renate Wohlwend	Manfred Biedermann; Hansjörg Goop; Christl Gstöhl-Jehle; Egon Gstöhl; Arnold Kind; Helmuth Kind; Oswald Kranz; Linde Oehri-Meier; Theo Oehri; Walter Oehry	Ingrid Allaart-Batliner; Fredi Kind; Wolfgang Marxer; Rosmarie Schädler-Matt
Source: Liechtensteiner Volksblatt

== Results ==
The FBP received 44.2% of the vote, a 2.1% increase from their 1989 performance, and won a plurality of twelve seats in the Landtag. The VU won 45.4%, a 1.8% decrease from 1989, and won eleven seats at a decrease of two. Despite the VU receiving 1.2% more of the vote than the FBP, the FBP won more seats due to winning five in the Unterland electoral district. The Free List saw its vote share increase from 7.6% to 10.4%, and it won two seats, making it the first third party to win seats in the Landtag.

A total of 12,255 ballots were cast, resulting in a 87.5% voter turnout.

Party	Votes	%	Seats	+/–
Progressive Citizens' Party	71,209	44.19	12	0
Patriotic Union	73,217	45.43	11	–2
Free List	16,724	10.38	2	+2
Total	161,150	100.00	25	0
Valid votes	12,092	98.67		
Invalid/blank votes	163	1.33		
Total votes	12,255	100.00		
Registered voters/turnout	13,999	87.54		
Source: Nohlen & Stöver

=== By electoral district ===
Electoral district	Seats	Party	Elected members	Substitutes	Votes	%	Swing	Seats	+/–
Oberland	15	Patriotic Union	Paul Kindle; Peter Wolff; Walter Hartmann; Norbert Bürzle; Karlheinz Ospelt; Lorenz Heeb; Volker Rheinberger	Walter Schädler; Kuno Frick	56,507	46.83	▼1.27	7	▼1
Oberland	15	Progressive Citizens' Party	Ernst Walch; Dieter Walch; Xaver Hoch; Guido Meier; Alois Beck; Werner Ospelt; Thomas Büchel	Christian Brunhart; Bruno Risch	50,982	42.25	▲2.25	7	0
Oberland	15	Free List	Paul Vogt	Hilmar Hoch	13,186	10.93	▲2.80	1	▲1
Unterland	10	Progressive Citizens' Party	Otmar Hasler; Renate Wohlwend; Gabriel Marxer; Carl Kaiser; Josef Büchel	Franz Hoop	20,214	49.99	▲1.17	5	0
Unterland	10	Patriotic Union	Oswald Kranz; Manfred Biedermann; Egon Gstöhl; Arnold Kind	Walter Oehry	16,692	41.28	▼2.85	4	▼1
Unterland	10	Free List	Wolfgang Marxer	Ingrid Allaart-Batliner	3534	8.74	▲3.00	1	▲1
Source: Liechtensteiner Volksblatt

== Aftermath ==
Following the election, Brunhart resigned as prime minister. The FBP invited the VU to begin negotiations for a renewed coalition government, which the VU accepted. Walser and Meier also resigned as government candidates, thus the VU nominated Mario Frick and Michael Ritter as candidates instead. The Free List also said that it was open to begin negotiations for a coalition government. The FBP and VU entered into a renewed coalition government, ultimately under the leadership of Büchel. As the junior party in the coalition, Frick became deputy prime minister. The new government was sworn in on 26 May 1993. On the first session of the newly-elected Landtag on 12 May, Ernst Walch of the FBP became President of the Landtag, with Paul Kindle of the VU as vice president.

Within three months of the government's term, in August 1993, Büchel came under controversy due to a disagreements with his party regarding the appointment of the head of the Liechtenstein tax administration. On 31 August, the FBP withdrew confidence in Büchel and publicly called for his resignation as prime minister; the party cited his poor performance in office, untruthfulness, and refusal to work with government colleagues as reasons for the loss in confidence. On 14 September, a FBP-initiated motion of no confidence in the Landtag against Büchel succeeded 17–8, so the body requested his dismissal. Hans-Adam II dismissed both the government and the Landtag, and fresh elections were held in October.
