= First Mario Frick cabinet =

Governing body of Liechtenstein (1993–1997)

- Government of Liechtenstein

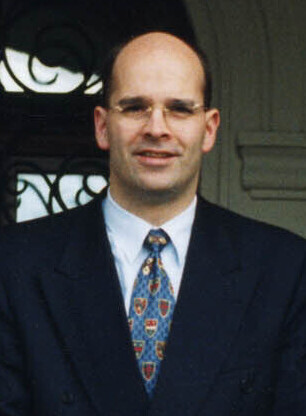
- Date formed: 15 December 1993
- Date dissolved: 14 April 1997

People and organisations
- Head of state: Hans-Adam II
- Head of government: Mario Frick
- Deputy head of government: Thomas Büchel
- Total no. of members: 5
- Member parties: FBP; VU
- Status in legislature: Coalition
- Opposition party: Free List

History
- Election: Oct 1993
- Predecessor: Markus Büchel cabinet
- Successor: Second Mario Frick cabinet

The First Mario Frick cabinet was the governing body of Liechtenstein from 15 December 1993 to 14 April 1997. It was appointed by Hans-Adam II and was chaired by Mario Frick.

== History ==
October 1993 Liechtenstein general election resulted in a win for the Patriotic Union. As a result, the Markus Büchel cabinet was dissolved with Mario Frick succeeding Markus Büchel as Prime Minister of Liechtenstein. He became Europe's youngest head of government at the time at 28 years old.

During the government's term, Liechtenstein entered the European Economic Area after a successful referendum in 1995, and also joined the World Trade Organization the same year. However, it also faced problems in its foreign relations, such as a dispute with the Czech Republic begun in 1992 over the confiscation of Princely properties estates in 1945.

The 1997 Liechtenstein general election resulted in a win for the Patriotic Union. As a result, the cabinet was dissolved and succeeded by the Second Mario Frick cabinet.

== Members ==
Picture	Name	Term	Role	Party
Prime Minister
	Mario Frick	15 December 1993 – 14 April 1997	Finance; Justice	Patriotic Union
Deputy Prime Minister
	Thomas Büchel	15 December 1993 – 14 April 1997	Interior; Education; Environment; Agriculture; Forestry	Progressive Citizens' Party
Government councillors
	Andrea Willi	15 December 1993 – 14 April 1997	Foreign affairs; Culture; Sports	Patriotic Union
	Michael Ritter	15 December 1993 – 14 April 1997	Business; Family; Healthcare; Social services	Patriotic Union
	Cornelia Gassner	15 December 1993 – 14 April 1997	Construction; Transport	Progressive Citizens' Party

== See also ==
- Politics of Liechtenstein
