= Cornelia Gassner =

Liechtensteiner politician (1958–2016)

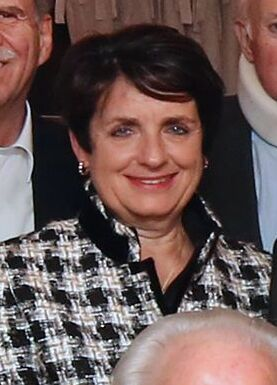
- Cornelia Gassner in 2014

Government Councillor of Construction and Transport
- In office 26 May 1993 – 14 December 1993
- Monarch: Hans-Adam II
- Prime Minister: Markus Büchel
- In office 15 December 1993 – 14 April 1997
- Monarch: Hans-Adam II
- Prime Minister: Mario Frick

Personal details
- Born: 1 May 1958 Mauren
- Died: 15 December 2016 Mauren
- Party: Progressive Citizens' Party
- Education: University of Innsbruck (LL.D.); London School of Economics and Political Science (LL.M)
- Occupation: Politician, lawyer, translator

Cornelia Alma Gassner (nee Matt; 1 May 1958 – 15 December 2016) was a Liechtensteiner lawyer and politician. She was the first woman to serve as a government councillor in Liechtenstein (equivalent to a minister in most parliamentary systems).

== Biography ==
=== Early career and education ===
Gassner was born Cornelia Matt in Mauren, Unterland in 1958. She had four siblings including politician Andrea Matt and was fluent in German, French, and English. Before entering political life, she married lawyer Arthur Gassner, with whom she had three children.

In 1985, Gassner graduated from the University of Innsbruck in Austria with a Doctor of Laws. She completed a Master of Laws at the London School of Economics and Political Science in England the following year.

Gassner entered politics as a member of the Progressive Citizens’ Party.

=== Political career ===
On 26 May 1993, the Progressive Citizens’ Party formed a coalition government with the Patriotic Union, led by Markus Büchel. Gassner was appointed by the Landtag, Liechtenstein's legislature, to serve as Government Councillor of Construction and Transport in Büchel's cabinet. She thereby became the first woman to hold a cabinet position, around nine years after Liechtenstein first gave women the right to vote. Her portfolio also oversaw telecommunications.

Büchel soon failed a vote of no confidence in the Landtag, and new elections were held in October 1993. Gassner was reappointed to her role under Prime Minister Mario Frick of the Patriotic Union party. The second woman to serve as a government councillor, Andrea Willi, also joined Frick's cabinet.

In May 1995, Liechtenstein joined the European Economic Area (EEA). Glassner subsequently oversaw the adoption of EEA construction regulations. In 1996, the government introduced the Telecommunications Act to regulate broadcasting in the country.

Gassner was not reappointed to Frick's second cabinet, which formed on 9 April 1997.

=== After politics ===
After leaving politics, Gassner became a practising lawyer in 1999. In October of that year, she established the partnership Gassner Treuhand- & Beratungs-Anstalt Trust & Consulting Company with fellow attorney Wolfgang Müller, which operated in Schaan. The practice specialised in commercial law, taxation, offshore incorporation, contracts, and copyright. She also worked with Wolfgang Müller at his litigation firm Müller & Partner, and served as a translator and sworn interpreter.

Gassner unsuccessfully ran in the 2009 Liechtenstein general election, again for the Progressive Citizens' Party.

=== Death ===
Gassner died on 15 December 2016 in Mauren after a long illness.

== Honours ==
- Liechtenstein : Commander's Cross of the Order of Merit of the Principality of Liechtenstein (1994)
