= Liechtenstein–Switzerland relations =

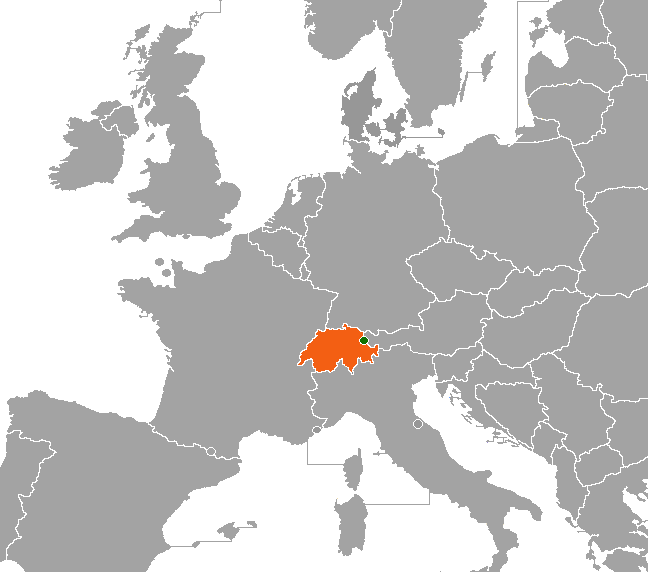

- Liechtenstein: Switzerland

Diplomatic and economic relations between Switzerland and Liechtenstein have been close, with Switzerland accepting the role of safeguarding the interests of its smaller neighbour, Liechtenstein. Liechtenstein has an embassy in Bern. Switzerland is accredited to Liechtenstein from its Federal Department of Foreign Affairs in Berne and maintains an honorary consulate in Vaduz.

The two countries share an open border, mostly on the Rhine, but also in the Rätikon range of the Alps, between the Fläscherberg and the Naafkopf.

== History of cooperation ==
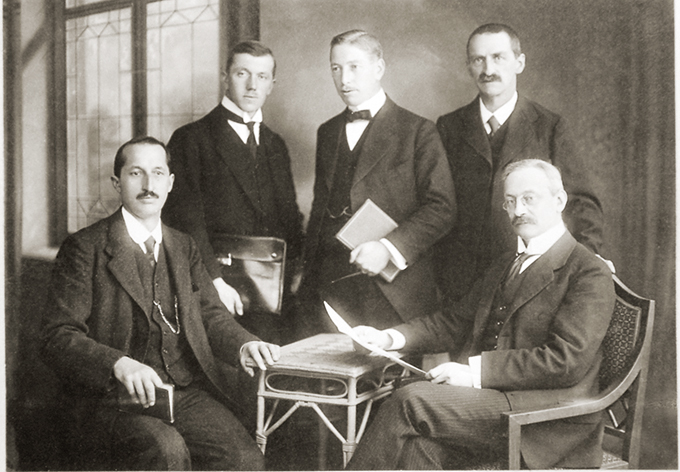
The Liechtenstein delegation for custom union negotiations with Switzerland, 1920

After the dissolution of Austria-Hungary in 1918, the Liechtenstein government could no longer rely on Austria to fulfil their monetary and diplomatic needs, and Liechtenstein terminated the customs union that had existed between them since 1852. Under the initiative of Prince Karl Aloys of Liechtenstein, he appealed to Swiss Foreign Minister Felix Calonder to begin negotiations for a monetary and diplomatic union between the two countries. At the request of Liechtenstein's government in October 1919, Switzerland agreed to safeguard Liechtenstein's interests and citizens abroad. Liechtenstein adopted use of the Swiss franc in 1920, and the two countries formed a customs union in 1924 with open borders. When Liechtenstein applied to join the League of Nations, Switzerland was the only country to vote in favour of their acceptance at the League of Nations Assembly on 17 December 1920, as opposed to 28 against.

During World War II, both countries were neutral. Liechtenstein sought to align itself as closely as possible with Switzerland during the war in hopes of retaining the country's neutrality. It achieved the de facto inclusion of Liechtenstein in the Swiss national supply. Though there were figures both inside and outside of Liechtenstein who used the country in order to recruit Liechtensteiners into the Waffen-SS and gain public sympathy for the Nazi cause, which infuriated Switzerland.

In 1949, Liechtenstein ceded the Ellhorn mountain to Switzerland as a result of Swiss demands and threats to, among other things, end the customs union between the two countries. Despite the local community in Balzers previously refusing to do so in November 1948, the transfer was approved by the Landtag of Liechtenstein the following month. In exchange to the transfer, Switzerland agreed to forgive much of Liechtenstein's debt that it had acquired to the country throughout World War II.

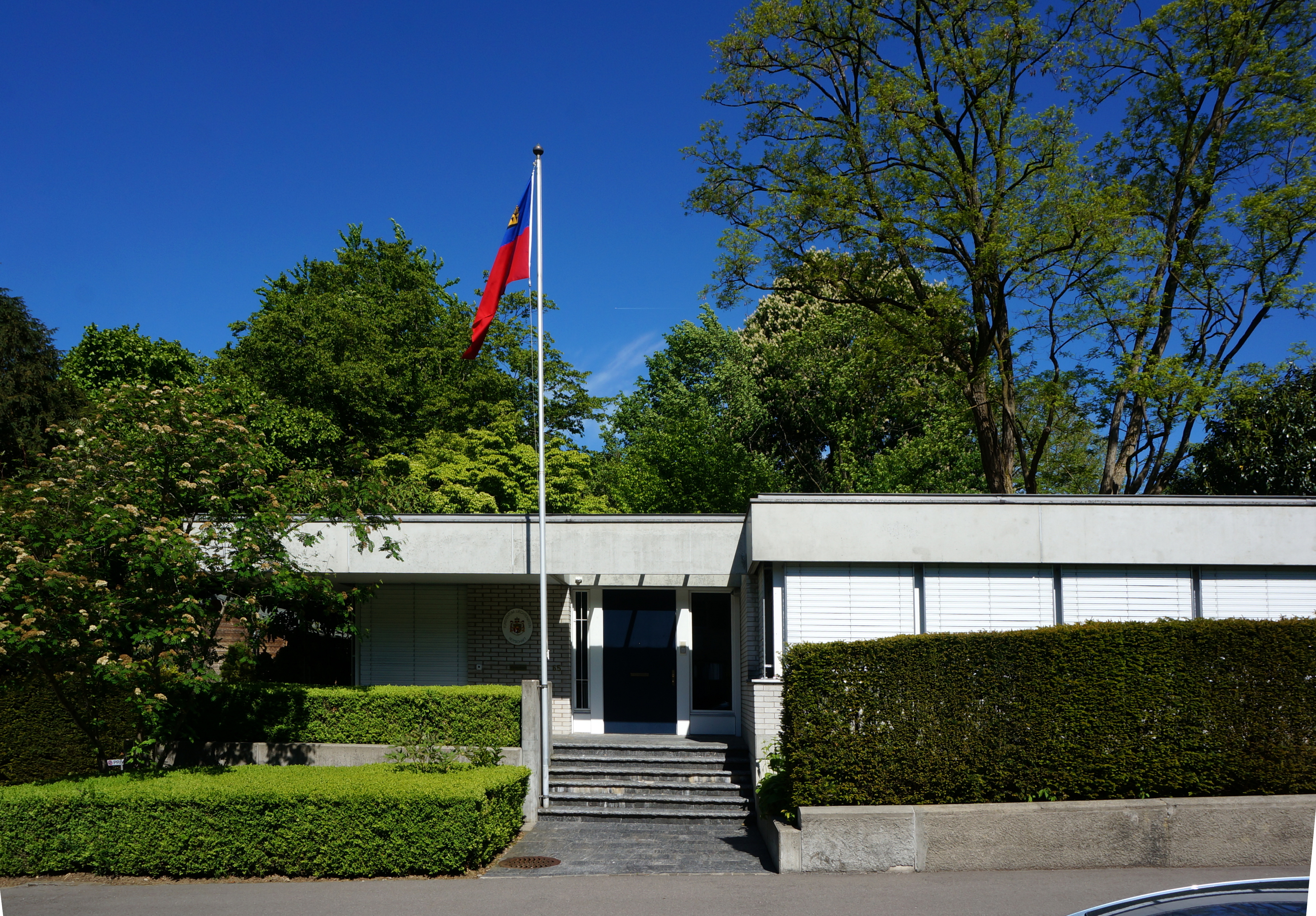
Liechtenstein embassy in Bern, Switzerland

Both are now also parties to the Schengen Agreement. The countries also have a common patent system. Switzerland is empowered to enter into treaties on Liechtenstein's behalf if Liechtenstein is not represented at the treaty negotiations; this power has most often been exercised with treaties involving customs duties or procedures.

The customs union agreement was renegotiated in 1994 as a result of the 1992 Liechtenstein constitutional crisis, where Switzerland rejected a referendum on the European Economic Area, whereas Liechtenstein accepted it in a corresponding referendum. The treaty was revised to allow for greater freedom for Liechtenstein in defining its foreign policy and it joined the organisation in May 1995.

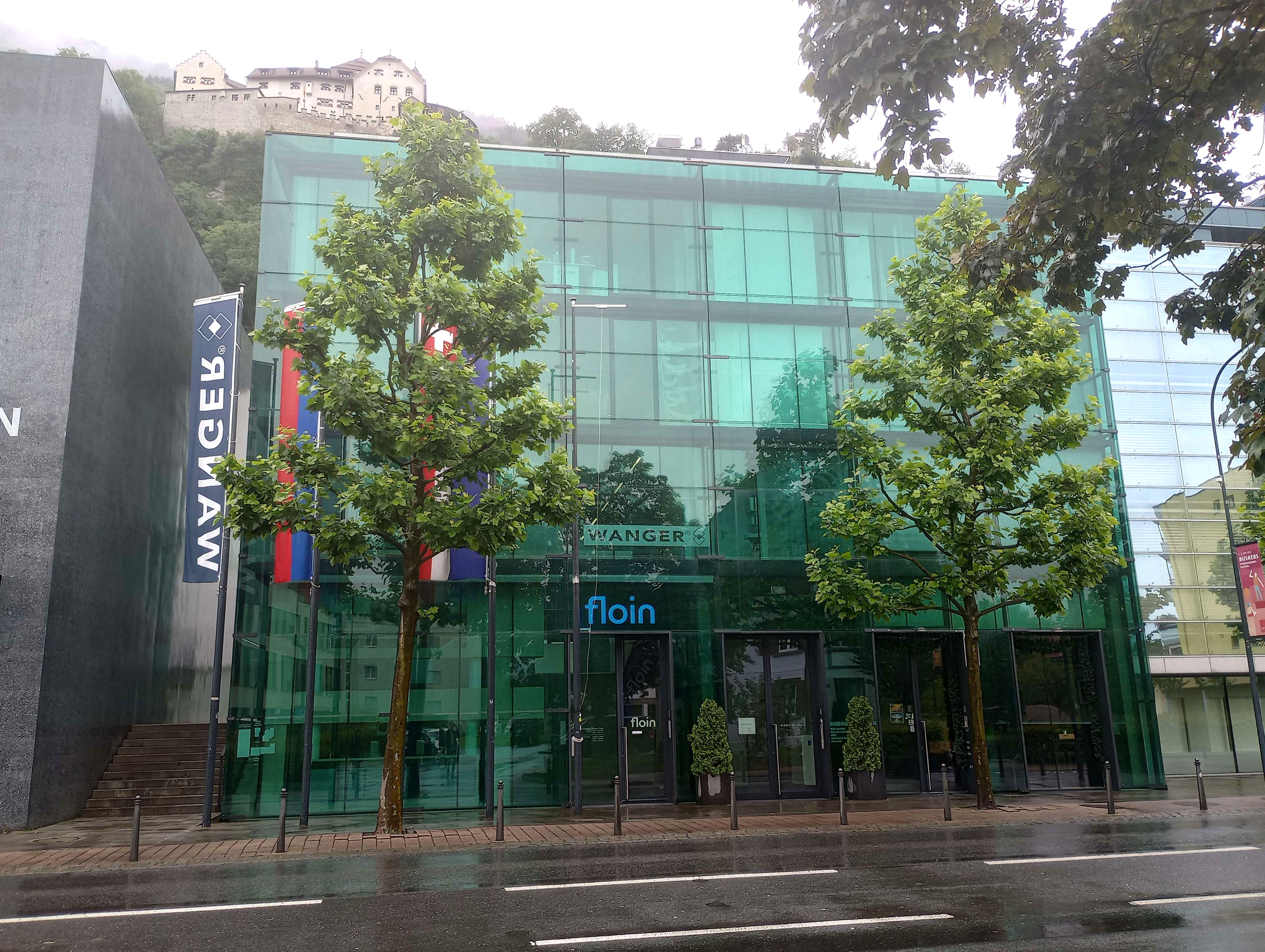
Swiss consulate in Vaduz, Liechtenstein

Swiss consular protection is extended to citizens of Liechtenstein. Switzerland represents Liechtenstein abroad unless they choose otherwise. Before Liechtenstein became a member in its own right of the European Free Trade Association in 1991, Switzerland represented its interests in that organization.

The two also share a common language, German, and are both outside the European Union. Like Switzerland, Liechtenstein maintains a policy of neutrality. However, whilst Switzerland follows a policy of armed neutrality, Liechtenstein does not have an army of its own. In February 2025, the Swiss Federal Council reiterated that Switzerland would not directly defend Liechtenstein in the event of a foreign attack, stating that it did not comply with the country's neutrality.

Ambassadors to one country are usually accredited to the other. The only resident ambassador in Liechtenstein is a knight of the Sovereign Military Order of Malta.

== Incidents involving the Swiss military ==
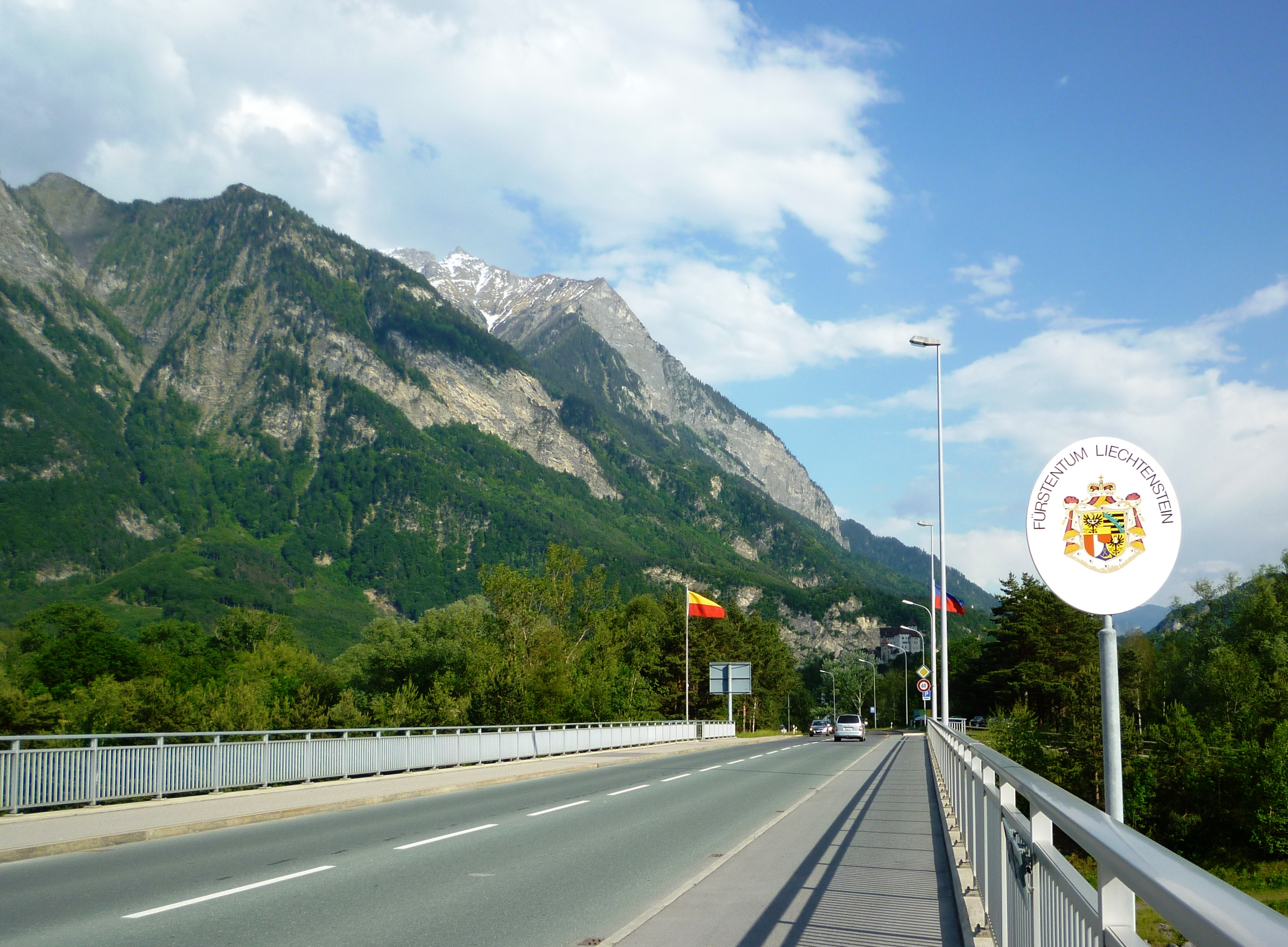
The open border between the two countries at Balzers and Trübbach (bridge over the Rhine)

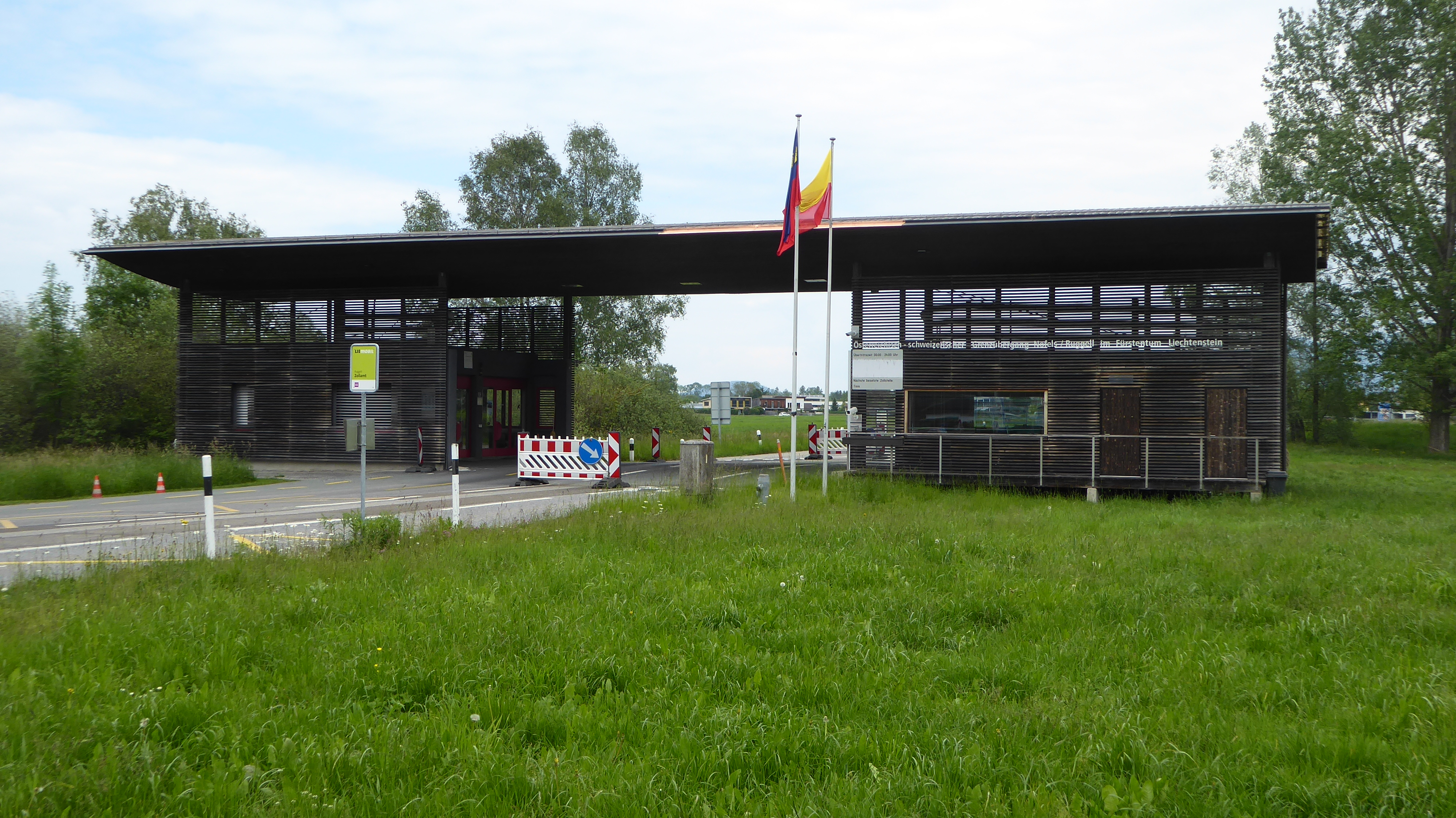
Swiss customs in Liechtenstein at the Austrian border near Ruggell

The Swiss Armed Forces are relatively active due to ongoing conscription. Several incidents have occurred during routine training:

- On 14 October 1968, five artillery shells fired by the Swiss army accidentally hit Liechtenstein's only ski resort, Malbun. The only recorded damages were to a few chairs belonging to an outdoor restaurant.
- On 26 August 1976, just before midnight, 75 members of the Swiss Army and a number of packhorses mistakenly took a wrong turn and ended up 500 metres (550 yd) into Liechtenstein at Iradug, in Balzers. The Liechtensteiners reportedly offered drinks to the Swiss soldiers, who declined and quickly departed.
- On 5 December 1985, anti-aircraft missiles fired by the Swiss Army landed in Liechtenstein amid a winter storm, causing a forest fire in a protected area. Switzerland paid millions of Francs in compensation.
- On 13 October 1992, following written orders, Swiss Army recruits unknowingly crossed the border and went to Triesenberg to set up an observation post. Swiss commanders had overlooked the fact that Triesenberg was not on Swiss territory. Switzerland apologized to Liechtenstein for the incident.
- Early on 1 March 2007, a company of 171 Swiss soldiers mistakenly entered Liechtenstein, as they were disoriented and took a wrong turn due to bad weather conditions. The troops returned to Swiss territory after they had travelled more than 2 km (1¼ miles) into the country. The Liechtenstein authorities did not discover the incursion and were informed by the Swiss after the incident. The incident was disregarded by both sides. A Liechtenstein spokesman said, "It's not like they invaded with attack helicopters".

== Taxation and tax treaties ==
Liechtenstein's standard rate of VAT (Mehrwertsteuer) is identical to Switzerland's for it must mirror the latter's continually and is currently 8.1%. The reduced rate is 2.5%. A special reduced rate of 3.7% is in use in the hotel industry.

In July 2015, both countries signed a new agreement on double taxation, which took effect in December 2016, superseding the previous one from 1995. Liechtenstein had hoped to implement withholding tax on Swiss residents working in Liechtenstein, but was unable to convince the Swiss to agree; Swiss border municipalities had opposed the change, fearing a loss of tax revenues.

In November 2016, the parliament of the principality decided with a large majority to introduce an agreement of automatic exchange of financial account information with 27 new treaty partners, including Switzerland. Data collection started in 2018, and effectual exchange of account information began in 2019.

== See also ==
- Liechtenstein franc
- List of diplomatic missions in Liechtenstein
- List of ambassadors of Liechtenstein to Switzerland
- Liechtenstein–EU relations
- Switzerland–EU relations
