= Mario Frick cabinet =

Mario Frick cabinet may refer to:

- First Mario Frick cabinet, governing body of Liechtenstein (1993–1997)
- Second Mario Frick cabinet, governing body of Liechtenstein (1997–2001)

== See also ==
- Mario Frick
