= Gstöhl =

Gstöhl is a surname. Notable people with the surname include:

- Egon Gstöhl (born 1956), Liechtenstein politician
- Sieglinde Gstöhl (born 1964), Liechtenstein academic
- Werner Gstöhl (1936–2024), Liechtenstein politician
