= 1993 Liechtenstein general election =

1993 Liechtenstein general election may refer to:

- February 1993 Liechtenstein general election
- October 1993 Liechtenstein general election
