= Markus Büchel cabinet =

Governing body of Liechtenstein in 1993

- Government of Liechtenstein

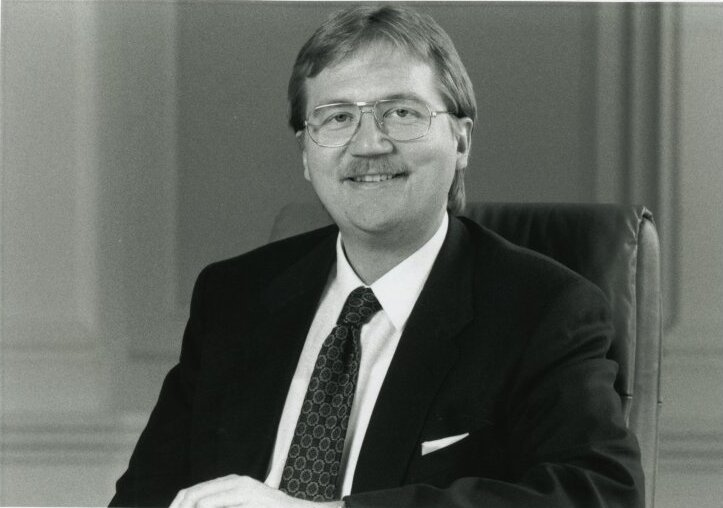
- Date formed: 26 May 1993
- Date dissolved: 15 December 1993

People and organisations
- Head of state: Hans-Adam II
- Head of government: Markus Büchel
- Deputy head of government: Mario Frick
- Total no. of members: 5
- Member parties: FBP; VU
- Status in legislature: Coalition
- Opposition party: Free List

History
- Election: Feb 1993
- Predecessor: Fourth Hans Brunhart cabinet
- Successor: First Mario Frick cabinet

The Markus Büchel Brunhart cabinet was the governing body of Liechtenstein from 26 May to 15 December 1993. It was appointed by Hans-Adam II and was chaired by Markus Büchel.

== History ==
The February 1993 Liechtenstein general election resulted in a win for the Progressive Citizens' Party. As a result, the Fourth Hans Brunhart cabinet was dissolved with Markus Büchel succeeding Hans Brunhart as Prime Minister of Liechtenstein. Cornelia Gassner became the first female government councillor in this cabinet.

During the government's term, Büchel co-signed the Constitution of the Princely House of Liechtenstein, though notably without consultation from the Landtag of Liechtenstein.

Shortly after its formation, Büchel became the subject of controversy due to him pushing through a government nomination despite the wishes of the FBP. On 14 September 1993, the Landtag of Liechtenstein passed a motion of no confidence against Büchel following a request by the party to do so. The following day, Hans-Adam II dismissed both the government and the Landtag and called for early elections, though notably against the wishes of the FBP. The subsequent October 1993 Liechtenstein general election resulted in a win for the Patriotic Union. As a result, the cabinet was dissolved and Büchel was succeeded by Mario Frick as prime minister in the First Mario Frick cabinet.

== Members ==
Picture	Name	Term	Role	Party
Prime Minister
	Markus Büchel	26 May 1993 – 15 December 1993	Foreign affairs; Finance; Transport; Culture; Youth; Sport	Progressive Citizens' Party
Deputy Prime Minister
	Mario Frick	26 May 1993 – 15 December 1993	Interior; Justice; Environment; Agriculture; Forestry	Patriotic Union
Government councillors
	Kurt Korner	26 May 1993 – 15 December 1993	Education	Progressive Citizens' Party
	Cornelia Gassner	26 May 1993 – 15 December 1993	Construction	Progressive Citizens' Party
	Michael Ritter	26 May 1993 – 15 December 1993	Business; Health; Social services	Patriotic Union

== See also ==
- Politics of Liechtenstein
