= Sieglinde =

- Pronunciation: {zeek-LIN-de}
- Gender: Female

Origin
- Origin: Germanic
- Derivation: Siglinde, Siggie, Sigi
- Meaning: victory and soft, tender, flexible
- Region of origin: German

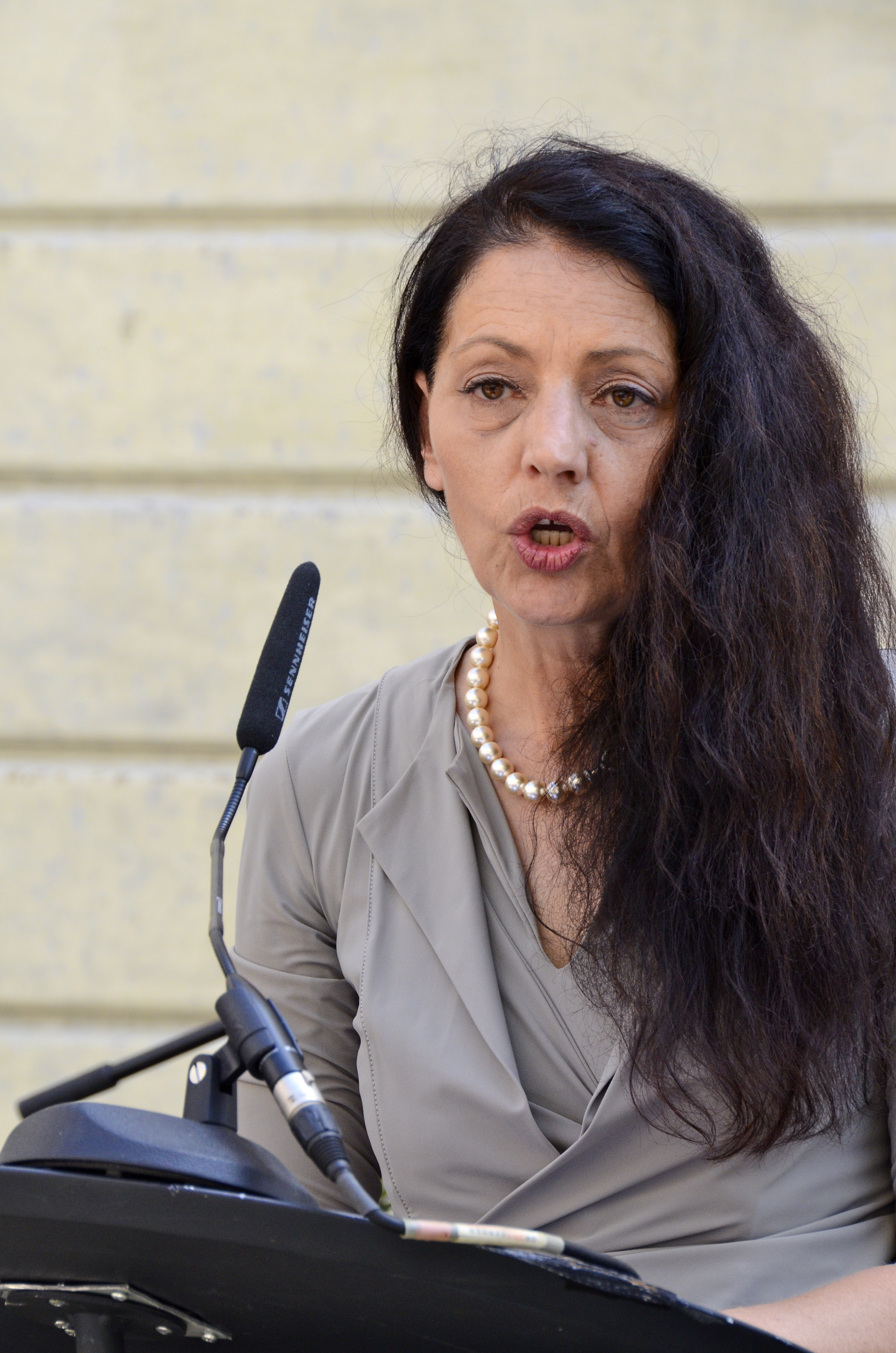
Klagenfurt city councillor Sieglinde Trannacher (SPÖ) during a speech at the Landhaushof, city of Klagenfurt, Carinthia / Austria / EU

Sieglinde zeek-LIN-də is a Germanic feminine given name. It is derived from two German words or elements. Those being: "sigu" for victory and "lind" for soft, tender, flexible. The diminutive version is "Sigi" or "Siggie".

It is also seen in German mythology. In the saga Nibelungenlied, Sieglinde was the mother of Siegfried.

Those with the name may refer to:

- Erda Sieglinde Walsh (born 1952), German-born Canadian politician
- Sieglinde Ahrens (born 1936), German organist and composer
- Sieglinde Ammann (born 1946), Swiss Olympic pentathlete
- Sieglinde Cadusch (born 1967), Swiss high jumper
- Sieglinde Gstöhl (born 1964), writer from Liechtenstein
- Sieglinde Hartmann (born 1954), German medievalist
- Sieglinde Hofmann (born 1945), German militant
- Sieglinde Wagner (1921–2003), Austrian operatic contralto

== Fictional characters ==
- Signy, the name of two heroines in two connected legends from Scandinavian mythology
- Sieglinde, a central character in Die Walküre, the second opera of Richard Wagner's Ring cycle
- Sieglinde Sullivan (born 1877), character from the manga and anime Black Butler
- Sieglinde, often called Sieg, is one of the main heroines of the Light Novel, Web Novel, and Manga series, I Got Caught Up in a Hero Summons, but the Other World Was at Peace!
- Sieglinde of Catarina, is an NPC from the video game Dark Souls (video game)

== Other meanings ==
- Sieglinde (potato), [de], German "potato of the year" in 2010

== See also ==
- Sieglinde (decoy), a sonar decoy used during the Second World War by German U-boats
- Zelinda (Italian form)
