= Johannes Matt =

Liechtenstein trustee and politician (born 1961)

Member of the Landtag of Liechtenstein for Unterland
- In office 24 October 1993 – 11 February 2001

President of the Progressive Citizens' Party
- In office 5 December 2001 – 7 April 2006
- Preceded by: Ernst Walch
- Succeeded by: Marcus Vogt

Personal details
- Born: 12 August 1961 (age 64) Altstätten, Switzerland
- Party: Progressive Citizens' Party
- Spouse(s): Doris Matt (m. 1987, divorced) Emmi Schädler (m. 1993)
- Children: 2

Johannes Matt (born 12 August 1961) is a trustee and former politician from Liechtenstein who served in the Landtag of Liechtenstein from 1993 to 2001. A member of the Progressive Citizens' Party (FBP), he served as the party's president from 2001 to 2006.

== Life ==
Matt was born on 12 August 1961 in Altstätten as the son of Ferdinand and Hedwig (née Büchel) as one of three children. He attended secondary school in Eschen and became a certified trustee in 1983; he has worked as a trustee and since 1987 he has been the owner and managing director of the trust company Tremaco, and also of Fidares since 2001, both of which are located in Eschen.

He was a member of the Ruggell municipal council from 1991 to 1995 as a member of the Progressive Citizens' Party (FBP). He was a member of the Landtag of Liechtenstein from 1993 to 2001; during this time, he was a member of the Landtag's finance and audit committees. Matt also vice president of the FBP from 1995 to 2000, then the party's president from December 2001 to April 2006.

He was the chairman of the board of trustees at the Kunstmuseum Liechtenstein from 2014 to 2016. In 2017 Matt, alongside Matthias Donhauser, founded the Foundation for Economic Policy and Constitutional Law.

Matt married Doris Matt on 10 April 1987, but they divorced. He then went on to marry Emmi Schädler on 26 May 1993 and they have two children together. He lives in Ruggell.

== Honours ==
- Liechtenstein: Commander's Cross with Star of the Order of Merit of the Principality of Liechtenstein (2006)
