= Kurt Korner =

Liechtenstein government councillor (born 1937)

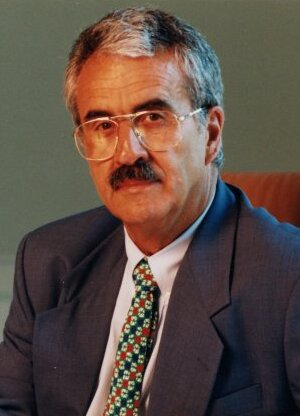
- Official portrait, 1993

Government councillor for Education
- In office 25 May 1993 – 15 December 1993
- Prime Minister: Markus Büchel

Personal details
- Born: 8 November 1937 (age 88)
- Party: Progressive Citizens' Party
- Spouse: Hilda
- Children: 4

Kurt Korner (born 4 June 1937) is a former teacher and politician from Liechtenstein who served as a government councillor in 1993, with the role of education.

== Life ==
Korner attended the University of Zurich to become a secondary school teacher. Until 1975, he was a teacher at the secondary school in Vaduz and also the evening technical college in the same municipality. In the mid 1970s he became the Liechtenstein school inspector, and then in 1987 became the head of the school department as the education advisor to the Liechtenstein government. He was a member of Liechtenstein's drug commission from 1981 to 2000.

Korner was nominated as a government candidate by the Progressive Citizens' Party (FBP) on 22 January 1993 for the February 1993 elections. The party won the election, and Korner became a government councillor on 26 May under the government of Markus Büchel, as part of the coalition government between the FBP and Patriotic Union (VU). He held the role of education. After a FBP-initiated motion of no confidence against Büchel passed in September, Korner was again a government candidate in the October 1993 elections, but the FBP lost to the VU and Korner did not participate in the next government. He left office on 15 December 1993.

Korner is married and has four children. Originally from Eschen, he lives in Triesen.
