= Norbert Bürzle =

Liechtenstein teacher and politician (born 1951)

Member of the Landtag of Liechtenstein for Oberland
- In office 7 February 1993 – 11 February 2001

Personal details
- Born: 6 September 1951 (age 74) Balzers, Liechtenstein
- Party: Patriotic Union
- Spouse: Annelies Kaufmann (m. 1977)
- Children: 3

Norbert Bürzle (born 6 September 1951) is a teacher and politician from Liechtenstein who served in the Landtag of Liechtenstein from 1993 to 2001.

As of 2011, he was a teacher at the Vaduz secondary school since 1973, and was also a civics teacher at the vocational school in Buchs from 1989 to 2003. He was a member of the Balzers municipal council from 2003 to 2011 and the deputy mayor of the municipality from 2003 to 2007.

In the run-up to the 2003 Liechtenstein constitutional referendum, Bürzle alongside other former members of the Landtag, opposed the proposed changes by the prince.
