= Lorenz Heeb =

Liechtenstein singer and politician (born 1949)

Member of the Landtag of Liechtenstein for Oberland
- In office 7 February 1993 – 11 February 2001

Personal details
- Born: 3 December 1949 (age 76) Schaan, Liechtenstein
- Party: Patriotic Union
- Spouse: Barbara Meneghini
- Relations: Carmen Heeb-Kindle (daughter-in-law)
- Children: 2

Lorenz Heeb (born 3 December 1949) is a singer and former politician from Liechtenstein who served in the Landtag of Liechtenstein from 1993 to 2001.

He worked as a primary and secondary school teacher in Vaduz and was a member of the Schaan municipal council from 1987 to 1995. He was the president of the Liechtenstein choir seminar from 2000 to 2022 and is a singer in the Schaan church choir.

In the run-up to the 2003 Liechtenstein constitutional referendum, Heeb alongside other former members of the Landtag, opposed the proposed changes by the prince.
