= Alois Beck =

Liechtenstein politician (born 1962)

Member of the Landtag of Liechtenstein for Oberland
- In office 3 February 2013 – 5 February 2017
- In office 7 February 1993 – 8 February 2009

Personal details
- Born: 27 September 1962 (age 63) Triesenberg, Liechtenstein
- Party: Progressive Citizens' Party
- Spouse: Anne Quaderer (m. 1996)
- Children: 2

Alois Beck (born 27 September 1962) is a politician from Liechtenstein who served in the Landtag of Liechtenstein from 1993 to 2009 and again from 2013 to 2017.

He studied economics in St. Gallen and works as a banker at VP Bank. He was also a board member of the Liechtenstein dance club.
