= Volker Rheinberger =

Liechtenstein chemist and politician (born 1948)

Member of the Landtag of Liechtenstein for Oberland
- In office 7 February 1993 – 11 February 2001

Personal details
- Born: 12 December 1948 (age 77) Vaduz, Liechtenstein
- Party: Patriotic Union
- Spouse: Cornelia Büchel (m. 1985)
- Children: 2

Volker M. Rheinberger (born 12 December 1948) is a chemist and politician from Liechtenstein who served in the Landtag of Liechtenstein from 1993 to 2001.

He has a doctorate in chemistry and a licentiate in economics. He works as a research chemist and as of 2011 is a member of the management of Ivoclar in Schaan. He was a member of the board of directors of the Historical Association for the Principality of Liechtenstein from 1996 to 2005. He was chairman of the University of Liechtenstein.

In the run-up to the 2003 Liechtenstein constitutional referendum, Rheinberger alongside other former members of the Landtag, opposed the proposed changes by the prince.
