= Wolfgang Marxer =

Liechtenstein politician (born 1960)

Member of the Landtag of Liechtenstein for Unterland
- In office 3 February 2013 – 5 February 2017
- In office 7 February 1993 – 24 October 1993

Personal details
- Born: 4 November 1960 (age 65) St. Gallen, Switzerland
- Party: Free List
- Occupation: Financial adviser

Wolfgang Marxer (born 4 November 1960) is a politician from Liechtenstein who served in the Landtag of Liechtenstein in 1993 and again from 2013 to 2017.

== Life ==
Marxer was born on 4 November 1960 in St. Gallen as the son of bricklayer Cirill Marxer Monika (née Heeb) as one of two children. He attended secondary school in Eschen before attending business school from 1981 to 1984 in St. Gallen and then graduating in business administration in Zürich 1988.

From 1980 to 1981 Marxer worked at a bank in Geneva. From 1984 to 1994 he worked at the VP Bank in Vaduz, where he was also the deputy director of the bank's branch at the British Virgin Islands. Since 2004, he has been a self-employed financial consultant in Eschen.

From February 1993 to the October the same year and again from 2013 to 2017 he was a member of the Landtag of Liechtenstein as a member of the Free List. He also served as a deputy member of the Landtag from 2005 to 2009 and again from 2017 to 2021. During this time, he was also a member of the audit, finance and state committee. Marxer, among other things, has advocated for the increasing of employer pension contributions.

Following a disappointing election result for the Free List in the 2009 elections, Marxer succeeded Egon Matt and Claudia Heeb-Fleck as president of the party in June. He served in this position until May 2013, when he was succeeded by Derya Kesci and Pepo Frick.
