= Second Mario Frick cabinet =

Governing body of Liechtenstein (1997–2001)

- Government of Liechtenstein

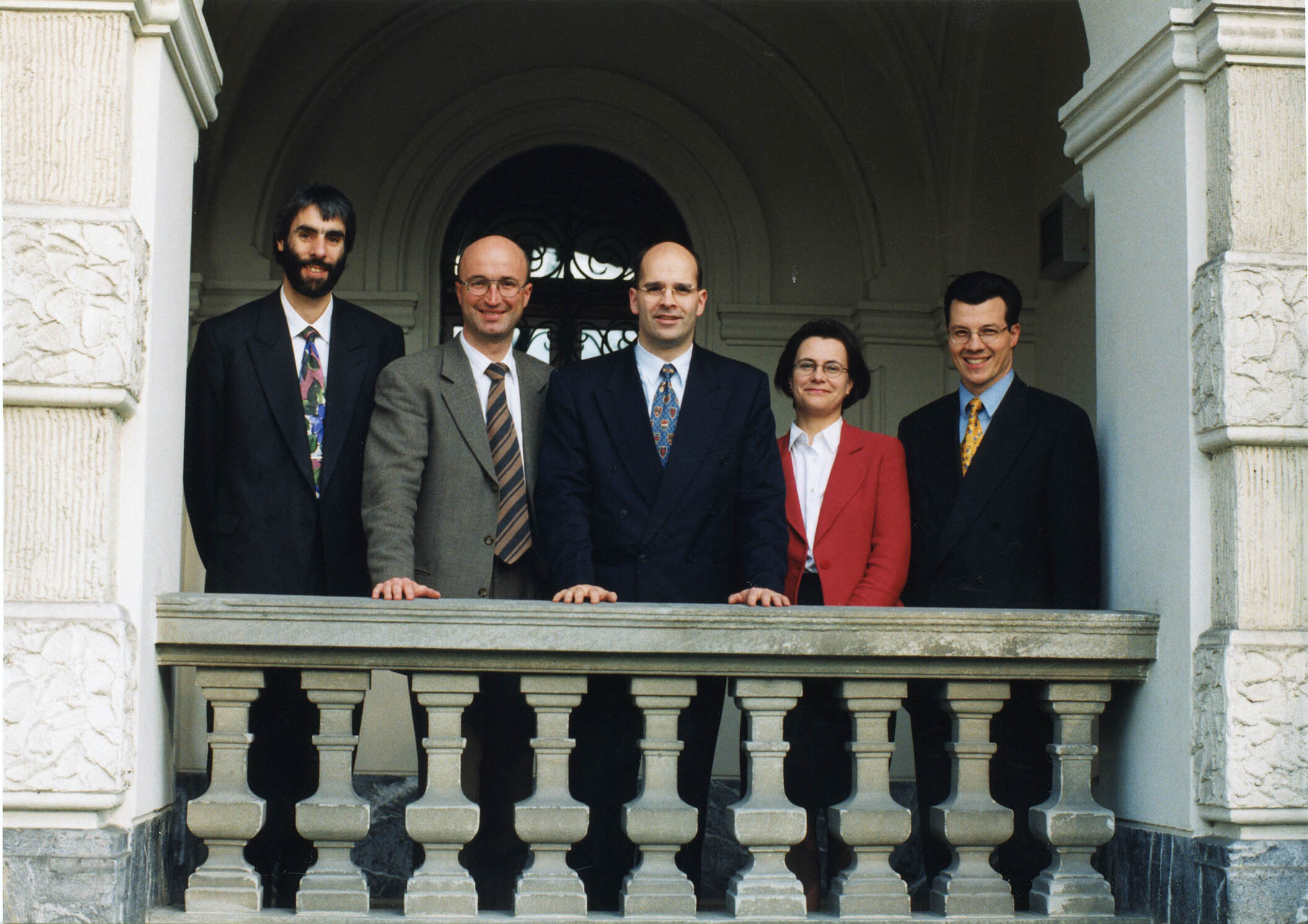
- Official photograph, 1997
- Date formed: 14 April 1997
- Date dissolved: 5 April 2001

People and organisations
- Head of state: Hans-Adam II
- Head of government: Mario Frick
- Deputy head of government: Michael Ritter
- Total no. of members: 5
- Member parties: VU
- Status in legislature: Majority
- Opposition party: Progressive Citizens' Party; Free List

History
- Election: 1997
- Predecessor: First Mario Frick cabinet
- Successor: First Otmar Hasler cabinet

The Second Mario Frick cabinet was the governing body of Liechtenstein from 9 April 1997 to 5 April 2001. It was appointed by Hans-Adam II and was chaired by Mario Frick.

== History ==
The 1997 Liechtenstein general election resulted in a win for the Patriotic Union. As a result, the First Mario Frick cabinet was succeeded with Mario Frick continuing as Prime Minister of Liechtenstein. The Progressive Citizens' Party withdrew from the coalition government that had existed since 1938, making the cabinet the first majority government since.

The government was faced with the challenge of the 1999–2001 Liechtenstein financial crisis, where the German Federal Intelligence Service accused various banks, politicians and judges within Liechtenstein of cooperating with organized crime to promote money laundering. This led to Liechtenstein being blacklisted by the Financial Action Task Force in 2000. As a result the government oversaw reforms to the Liechtenstein financial sector to combat organized crime and money laundering.

The government also faced continued issues with foreign relations, such as in 2001 a dispute with Germany started in the International Court of Justice over royal property confiscated in order to pay war debts.

The 2001 Liechtenstein general election resulted in a win for the Progressive Citizens' Party. As a result, the cabinet was dissolved and Frick was succeeded by Otmar Hasler in the First Otmar Hasler cabinet.

== Members ==
Picture	Name	Term	Role	Party
Prime Minister
	Mario Frick	14 April 1997 – 5 April 2001	Finance; Construction; Family	Patriotic Union
Deputy Prime Minister
	Michael Ritter	14 April 1997 – 5 April 2001	Interior; Education; Environment; Agriculture; Forestry	Patriotic Union
Government councillors
	Andrea Willi	14 April 1997 – 5 April 2001	Foreign affairs; Culture; Sports; Family	Patriotic Union
	Heinz Frommelt	14 April 1997 – 5 April 2001	Justice	Patriotic Union
	Norbert Marxer	14 April 1997 – 5 April 2001	Education; Environment; Transport	Patriotic Union

== See also ==
- Politics of Liechtenstein
