= Guido Meier =

Liechtenstein lawyer and politician (born 1948)

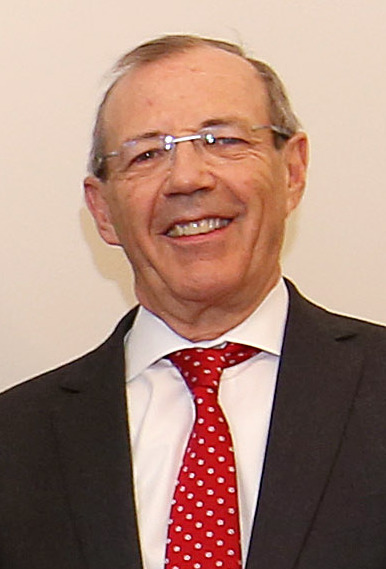
- Meier in 2018

Member of the Landtag of Liechtenstein for Oberland
- In office 10 December 1993 – 2 February 1997
- Preceded by: Thomas Büchel
- In office 7 February 1993 – 24 October 1993

Personal details
- Born: 8 January 1948 (age 78) Vaduz, Liechtenstein
- Party: Progressive Citizens' Party
- Spouse(s): Marjorie Belt (m. 1977, divorced) Doris Krummenacher (m. 2015)
- Children: 2

Guido Meier (born 8 January 1948) is a lawyer, trustee and politician from Liechtenstein who served in the Landtag of Liechtenstein from 1993 to 1997. Since 1986, he has been the president of the Liechtenstein Institute.

== Life ==
Meier was born 8 January 1948 in Vaduz as the son of chief of police Hermann Meier and Maria (née Ospelt) as one of three children. He studied law in Tampa, Florida and Basel, receiving a doctorate in law in 1977. He was worked as a trustee since 1977 and as a lawyer since 1979, where he owns a law firm. He was a member of the board of directors from 1989 to 2016, and also the vice president of the board from 2001 to 2016. Since 1986, he has been the president of the Liechtenstein Institute. He was a judge at the Liechtenstein state court from 1984 to 1993.

He was elected as a member of the Landtag of Liechtenstein in February 1993 as a member of the Progressive Citizens' Party (FBP). He was elected as a deputy member in October 1993, but succeeded Thomas Büchel on 10 December following his resignation to become Deputy Prime Minister of Liechtenstein. He was briefly the FBP's spokesman in the Landtag in 1993. He has been the honorary consul of Monaco in Liechtenstein since 1989.

In the run-up to the 2003 Liechtenstein constitutional referendum, Meier, alongside other former members of the Landtag, opposed the prince's proposed changes.

Meier supported a proposal banning casinos in Liechtenstein. However, he faced controversy for having previously served on a casino's board of directors. The proposal was rejected by voters in a referendum in January 2023.

Meier married Marjorie Belt on 19 March 1977 and they had two children together. He then went on to marry Doris Krummenacher on 18 September 2015. In January 2023, to mark his 75th birthday, he was the subject of a commemorative publication by the Liechtenstein institute.
