= 1992 Liechtenstein constitutional crisis =

1992 constitutional and diplomatic crisis in Liechtenstein

Approximately 2000 people demonstrating in front of the Liechtenstein government house on 28 October 1992.

The 1992 Liechtenstein constitutional crisis culminated on 28 October 1992 when Prince Hans-Adam II called for a referendum regarding Liechtenstein's accession to the European Economic Area to be held before the corresponding referendum in Switzerland, against the countries' custom union and the wishes of the government and the Landtag.

== Background ==
Switzerland and Liechtenstein formed a customs union in 1924. According to the 1923 customs agreement, Switzerland represents Liechtenstein where it does not already have representation, and accession to international treaties or organisations that Switzerland is not a member of requires both countries to reach a bilateral agreement.

On 6 December 1992 a referendum was to be held in Switzerland on a federal resolution on the accession to the European Economic Area (EEA). In correspondence with the customs union, a similar referendum was to be held in Liechtenstein at a similar time. Hans-Adam II had previously publicly declared his desires to increase Liechtenstein's independence in foreign policy from Switzerland.

== Crisis ==
When planning on the date for the Liechtenstein referendum regarding accession to the EEA, Prince Hans-Adam II called for it to be held in advance of the corresponding one in Switzerland, against the wishes of both the government and the Landtag. On 28 October 1992, he threatened to dissolve the Landtag and dismiss the Prime Minister of Liechtenstein, Hans Brunhart, over the dispute, and appoint an acting prime minister in his place.

In response, notable politicians in Liechtenstein, including former prime minister Gerard Batliner formed the Nonpartisan Committee for Monarchy and Democracy and called for a demonstration against Hans-Adam's threatened dissolution of the Landtag. Approximately 2,000 people demonstrated in front of the government house in Vaduz. On the same day, the government and Hans-Adam II negotiated and came to an agreement that scheduled the referendum after the corresponding one in Switzerland, though notably it affirmed that Liechtenstein would commit to agreements with the EEA despite the result in Switzerland.

The 1992 Swiss referendum regarding a federal solution towards the EEA was rejected by voters. On the other hand, the 1992 Liechtenstein referendum on the same topic was accepted by 55.8% of voters. As a result, the 1924 customs union treaty was now compromised, and was no longer viable due to conflicting interests regarding accession to the EEA. In 1994, the treaty was revised to allow for greater freedom for Liechtenstein in defining its foreign policy. Another referendum on the topic on 9 April 1995 was accepted by 55.9% of voters. Liechtenstein subsequently joined the EEA the following month.
