= Gabriel Marxer =

Liechtenstein lawyer and politician (born 1960)

Member of the Landtag of Liechtenstein for Unterland
- In office 7 February 1993 – 11 February 2001

Personal details
- Born: 8 May 1960 (age 65) Eschen, Liechtenstein
- Political party: Progressive Citizens' Party
- Spouse(s): Karin Bühler (m. 1985, divorced) Susanna Wohlwend (m. 2000)
- Children: 2

Gabriel Marxer (born 8 May 1960) is a lawyer and former politician from Liechtenstein who served in the Landtag of Liechtenstein from 1993 to 2001.

He studied law at the University of Innsbruck, where he received a doctorate in 1984, and he has worked as a self-employed lawyer since 1988. In 2000, Marxer had his parliamentary immunity revoked and was subsequently arrested in connection to the 1999–2001 Liechtenstein financial crisis. However, he was acquitted in December 2002.
