= Arnold Kind =

Liechtenstein teacher and politician (born 1957)

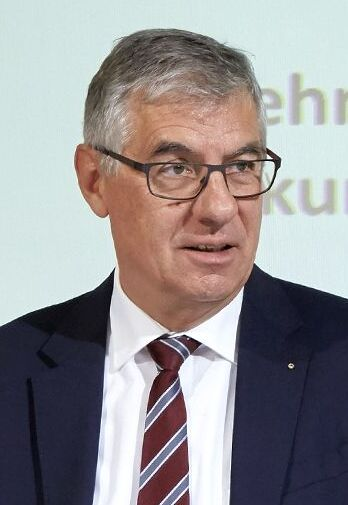
- Kind in 2019

Member of the Landtag of Liechtenstein for Unterland
- In office 7 February 1993 – 24 October 1993

Personal details
- Born: 22 June 1957 (age 68) Ruggell, Liechtenstein
- Political party: Patriotic Union
- Spouse: Esther Batliner (m. 1984)
- Children: 3

Arnold Kind (born 22 June 1957) is a former teacher and politician from Liechtenstein who served in the Landtag of Liechtenstein in 1993.

He worked as a primary school teacher in Gamprin from 1977 to 1990. From 1990 he worked in the Liechtenstein school administration and was the head of the school district until his retirement in 2021. He lives in Ruggell.
