= Walter Hartmann (politician) =

Liechtenstein politician (born 1949)

Member of the Landtag of Liechtenstein for Oberland
- In office 7 February 1993 – 13 March 2005

Personal details
- Born: 18 January 1949 (age 76) Vaduz, Liechtenstein
- Political party: Patriotic Union
- Spouse: Margaretha Steidl (m. 1983)
- Children: 2

Walter Hartmann (born 18 January 1949) is a dentist and politician from Liechtenstein who served in the Landtag of Liechtenstein from 1993 to 2005.

He opened his own dentistry practice in Vaduz in 1985. In 2023, he was a supporter of the initiative to change the creation of citizen's electronic health record from automatic to only created for those who specifically consent to its creation. The proposal was subsequently rejected via referendum in 2024.
