= Manfred Biedermann =

Liechtenstein teacher and politician (1952–2017)

Member of the Landtag of Liechtenstein for Unterland
- In office 5 March 1989 – 2 February 1997

Personal details
- Born: 1 March 1952 Mauren, Liechtenstein
- Died: 3 October 2017 (aged 65)
- Party: Patriotic Union
- Spouse: Verena Kappeler (m. 1978)
- Relations: Gisela Biedermann (sister-in-law)
- Children: 4

Manfred Biedermann (1 March 1952 – 3 October 2017) was a teacher and politician from Liechtenstein who served in the Landtag of Liechtenstein from 1989 to 1997.

== Life ==
Biedermann was born on 1 March 1952 as the son of Benedikt Biedermann and Julia (née Summer) as one of four children. He attended teachers' training college in Rickenbach and then special education training in Weinfelden. He worked as a primary, secondary and special education teacher, and also head of the Eschen secondary school. He was president of the local school board. He was a member of the board of trustees of the Liechtenstein National Museum from 1977 to 1985.

He was a member of the Mauren municipal council from 1987 to 1991 as a member of the Patriotic Union. He was a member of the Landtag of Liechtenstein from 1989 to 1997. During this time, he was a member of the state committee and chairman of the audit committee. Biedermann ran for mayor of Mauren in the 1991 local elections, but was defeated by Johannes Kaiser of the Progressive Citizens' Party. He was the last VU mayoral candidate in Mauren until Peter Frick in 2023.

Biedermann was a member of the Liechtenstein government's cultural advisory board from 1997 to 2007. He was the conductor of the Nendeln men's church choir from 1982 to 2005. He was the official Liechtenstein bee inspector from 1975 and president of the Liechtenstein beekeepers' association from 1997.

In the run-up to the 2003 Liechtenstein constitutional referendum, Biedermann alongside other former members of the Landtag, opposed the proposed changes by the prince.

Biedermann married Verena Kappeler on 4 October 1978 and they had four children together. He died in an accident on 3 October 2017, aged 65.
