= Egon Gstöhl =

Liechtenstein politician (born 1956)

Member of the Landtag of Liechtenstein for Unterland
- In office 7 February 1993 – 2 February 1997

Personal details
- Born: 23 April 1956 (age 69); Eschen, Liechtenstein
- Political party: Patriotic Union
- Spouse: Doris Clement (m. 1983)
- Children: 3

Egon Gstöhl (born 23 April 1956) is a PR consultant and former politician from Liechtenstein who served in the Landtag of Liechtenstein from 1993 to 1997.

He trained as an economist in St. Gallen and then as a PR consultant in Biel. He was the head of the press and information office of the Liechtenstein government from 1983 to 1990. During his time in the Landtag, he was the chairman of the finance committee. Since 2002, he has worked as an independent PR consultant. He is also the vice president of Slow-up Werdenberg-Liechtenstein.

== Honours ==
- Liechtenstein: Commander's Cross of the Order of Merit of the Principality of Liechtenstein (1985)
