= Oswald Kranz =

Liechtenstein politician (born 1953)

Member of the Landtag of Liechtenstein for Unterland
- In office 5 March 1989 – 11 February 2001

Personal details
- Born: 5 November 1953 (age 71); Eschen, Liechtenstein
- Political party: Patriotic Union
- Spouse: Herta Marxer (m. 1979)
- Children: 4

Oswald Kranz (born 5 November 1953) is a politician from Liechtenstein who served in the Landtag of Liechtenstein from 1989 to 2001.

He works as an insurance salesman and was an auditor in Eschen from 1984 to 1992. He was the president of the Patriotic Union from 1991 to 2001. His brother Günther Kranz also served in the Landtag.
