= 1992 Liechtenstein referendums =

Referendums for approving international treaties
For	71.42%
Against	28.58%

Lowering the voting age from 20 to 18
For	43.70%
Against	56.30%

Abolishing the 8% electoral threshold
For	32.34%
Against	67.66%

Constitutional clause banning discrimination
For	24.56%
Against	75.44%

Joining the European Economic Area
For	55.81%
Against	44.19%

Five referendums were held in Liechtenstein during 1992. The first was held on 15 March on whether referendums should be introduced to approve international treaties, and was approved by 71.4% of voters. The second on 28 June concerned lowering the voting age from 20 to 18, but was rejected by 56.3% of voters. Two referendums were held on 8 November on abolishing the 8% electoral threshold and adding a clause to the constitution banning discrimination, both of which were rejected. The fifth and final referendum on 13 December was on joining the European Economic Area. It was approved by 55.8% of voters, with a voter turnout of 87%.

Despite the vote in favour, when the EEA subsequently came into existence in 1994, Liechtenstein did not join until after a second referendum in 1995.

== Results ==
=== Treaty referendum ===
Choice	Votes	%
For	6,281	71.4
Against	2,513	28.6
Invalid/blank votes	183	–
Total	8,977	100
Registered voters/turnout	13,870	64.7
Source: Nohlen & Stöver

=== Lowering the voting age from 20 to 18 ===
Choice	Votes	%
For	2,184	43.7
Against	2,814	56.3
Invalid/blank votes	83	–
Total	5,081	100
Registered voters/turnout	13,925	36.5
Source: Nohlen & Stöver

=== Abolishment of the 8% electoral threshold ===
Choice	Votes	%
For	2,373	32.3
Against	4,964	67.7
Invalid/blank votes	151	–
Total	7,488	100
Registered voters/turnout	13,979	53.6
Source: Nohlen & Stöver

=== Amendment of the constitution to ban discrimination ===
Choice	Votes	%
For	1,782	24.6
Against	5,473	75.4
Invalid/blank votes	233	–
Total	7,488	100
Registered voters/turnout	13,979	53.6
Source: Nohlen & Stöver

=== Joining the European Economic Area ===
Choice	Votes	%
For	6,722	55.8
Against	5,322	44.2
Invalid/blank votes	120	–
Total	12,164	100
Registered voters/turnout	13,982	87.0
Source: Nohlen & Stöver

== See also ==
- 1992 Liechtenstein constitutional crisis
