= VP Bank =

Private bank based in Liechtenstein

VP Bank AG
- Type: Aktiengesellschaft (AG)
- ISIN: LI0315487269
- Industry: Banking
- Founded: 1956
- Headquarters: Vaduz, Liechtenstein, Vaduz, Liechtenstein
- Key people: Stephan Zimmermann (chairman of the board)
- Net income: CHF 47.0 million (2025)
- AUM: CHF 53 683.6 million (2025)
- Total assets: CHF 10.7 billion (2025)
- Number of employees: 994
- Website: www.vpbank.com

VP Bank AG is a Liechtenstein-based bank headquartered in Vaduz and specialized in private banking. It was founded on April 6, 1956 by Princely Councillor of Commerce Guido Feger and is one of the three major banks in Liechtenstein along with the LGT Group and the LLB.

In addition to its head office in Liechtenstein, VP Bank Group has subsidiary companies with banking licences in Switzerland, Luxembourg, the British Virgin Islands and Singapore. Its core competencies include the development of customised financial solutions for intermediaries and private individuals.

The A registered shares of VP Bank are listed on SIX Swiss Exchange in Zürich, Switzerland.

== History ==
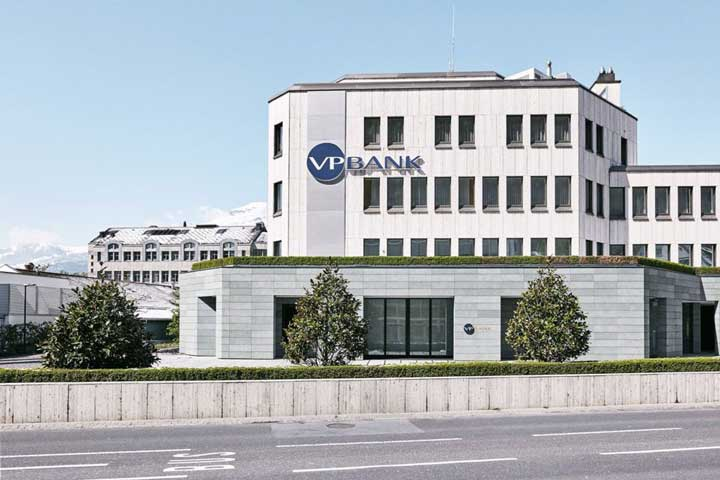
VP Bank headquarters in Vaduz

1956 through 1962: Founding and development

Until 1956, there were only two banks in Liechtenstein: the Liechtensteinische Landesbank as an institution governed by public law, and Bank in Liechtenstein AG, a private-law company. On 6 April 1956, Guido Feger founded Verwaltungs- und Privat-Bank – today's VP Bank – in the legal form of a Liechtenstein institution with start-up capital of 2 million Swiss francs. The founding was a logical extension of Guido Feger's Allgemeinen Treuunternehmens (ATU), at the time the largest and oldest trust company in Vaduz. In 1956, it employed 13 people in Liechtenstein and, on behalf of clients, four offices workers in foreign countries. Together, they catered to the needs of roughly 900 clients in matters pertaining to the fiduciary administration of real estate interests, securities portfolios and current accounts – mainly in the CHF realm and the United States – as well as patent rights, loans and fixed-term deposits.

Guido Feger was granted a concession for his bank only after a second attempt: he had already submitted an application on 15 July 1955 for approval to conduct all types of banking transactions. As Liechtenstein's Persons and Companies Act included a protective clause in favour of the Landesbank, the government at the time rejected the application by stating the following: "Inasmuch as the founding of a private bank would have a strong impact on the interests of the Liechtensteinische Landesbank and encroach upon the business field, the petition has been turned down."

In verbal negotiations, Feger thereafter promised "…to safeguard the Liechtenstein character of the bank both in terms of its corporate bodies and the employment of local residents." On 22 March 1956, he submitted a set of regulations specifying that the organisation and business activities of the proposed bank were not to compete with the Landesbank. In response, the government ultimately granted the concession on 4 April 1956, whereby those regulations were deemed an integral part of the approval. They were binding on Guido Feger as a person and dictated that the bank may accept no savings deposits, conduct no foreign currency exchange and not grant loans (including mortgage lending). Thus in the early years, the bank had to concentrate almost entirely on non-domestic activities. However, in building up its business, VP Bank was able to benefit from the relationships that ATU had already fostered since 1929 with banks, financial intermediaries and private clients in Switzerland and elsewhere abroad. Over the six years between 1956 and 1962, the net assets of VP Bank increased steadily from six million to 15 million Swiss francs.

1963 through 1969: Initial growth phase

After the founding and development years as well as its conversion into a joint-stock company, VP Bank's size and profitability grew significantly between 1963 and 1969. By 1969 its total assets stood at CHF 150 million, while revenues continued to rise during that period and client assets under management had increased from 19 million to 134 million Swiss francs. That growth was attributable to the fact that, since 1963, the bank was allowed to conduct all banking activities not subject to official rules and regulations. In December 1967, parliament abrogated the contingency of the banking concession on the founder and hence the related time limitation for VP Bank. In return, VP Bank committed to keeping at all times a minimum of 60 per cent of its voting rights and 51 per cent of its share capital legally and beneficially in the hands of Liechtenstein citizens.

1970 through 1979: Difficult years

The economic environment for VP Bank in the period between 1970 and 1979 was marked by currency, stock market and banking crises. Historically high inflation rates, a devaluation of the Swiss franc in 1971, the plummeting US dollar exchange rate, collapsing stock prices, scandals surrounding Cologne's Herstatt-Bank in 1974 and Switzerland's SKA in 1977, along with a recession in Liechtenstein that started in 1975 – the first in the post-WWII era for the Principality – all combined to make the 1970s indeed a turbulent decade. To defend against excessive capital inflows from abroad, the Swiss government in June 1972 prohibited the payment of interest on foreign CHF-denominated deposits and imposed a commission on them (negative interest rates of up to ten per cent quarterly, i.e. 40 per cent per year). Liechtenstein was declared a foreign country with regard to currency; however, upon Liechtenstein's adoption of the relevant Swiss provisions, the Federal Council once again granted the Principality domestic status for currency and foreign exchange purposes as of 1 August 1973. VP Bank increased its share capital twice by 15 million Swiss francs in 1974 and 1979. And finally, the bank was granted in 1975 a full concession to offer the entire range of banking products, including savings accounts and mortgages. During this consolidation phase, its total assets increased from 150 to 530 million Swiss francs and the workforce more than doubled from 41 to 86.

1980 through 2000: Renewed upswing

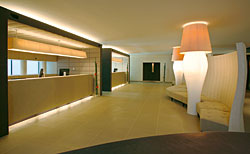
VP Bank counter hall in Vaduz

The bank, which had established a number of foreign subsidiary companies in the years after 1988, published its first consolidated financial statements for the 1995 business year. Over the two decades of this boom phase, its total assets increased from 530 million (end-1979) to 10.9 billion Swiss francs (end-2000), reported total net income rose from CHF 2.9 million to 197 million, and the workforce more than sextupled from 86 to 563. The main book turnover (single-sided) of the parent bank alone surged from 6.7 to 77.3 billion Swiss francs between 1980 and 1989. Business for VP Bank Group flourished in the second half of the 1990s: total Group assets grew from 6.3 billion (1995) to 10.9 billion Swiss francs (2000) and gross income (revenues less operating expenses) from CHF 94 million to 254 million, whereas the commission and services business overtook the interest-differential business in 1997 as the major pillar of the income statement. In the years between 1996 and 2000, there was also a doubling of client assets under management from CHF 15 billion (end-1995) to 31 billion. Consolidated net income increased from 48 million (1995) to 197 million (2000) Swiss francs. As the significance of VP Bank Group's foreign subsidiary companies grew, the proportion of investments attributable to them (assets held in non-CHF regions) increased as well, from 22 per cent (1996) to 40 per cent (2000) and ultimately to a high of 58.3 per cent at the end of 2005. As always, VP Bank placed those funds only with top-rated banks. The progressively internationalised bank redoubled its risk management efforts in the late 1990s and introduced an Asset and Liability Committee.

2001 through 2006: Crisis, restructuring and recovery

VP Bank Group's total assets declined in 2001 and 2002 by almost 20 per cent to CHF 8.9 billion. Consolidated net income also fell from 197 million Swiss francs in 2000 to 68 million (2001) and ultimately 38 million (2002). Despite the cost-saving measures introduced in early 2002, gross income (revenues less operating expenses at current prices) shrunk during this time frame from CHF 254 million to 36 million, with the lion's share of that decrease being attributable to securities-related income. Given the dismal financial market environment, the bank was forced to haircut the value of its proprietary securities holdings (including its own VP Bank shares) report a loss of 38 million (2001) and 75 million (2002) Swiss francs for this business segment. The collapse in 2002 was also attributable to a decrease in assets under management from CHF 29.6 billion (2001) to 25.2 billion (2002) as well as disadvantageous exchange rate trends. During 2002, the workforce was reduced from 563 to 549 employees. A recovery got underway in 2003, with gross income surging back to 139 million Swiss francs and consolidated net income to CHF 95 million, thereby putting the bank back on its successful pre-crisis course. By the end of 2006, total assets had returned to CHF 9.5 billion (2005: 8.2 billion), consolidated net income to 132 million (2005: 119 million), and assets under management rose to 35.5 billion Swiss francs (2005: 30.1 billion). Gross income of CHF 174 million now stood 30 per cent higher than two years earlier (2004: 134 million).

2007: Additional subsidiaries in Dubai and Hong Kong

In April, VP Bank opens a new office in Dubai and then in September an asset management company in Singapore.

2008: VP Bank receives banking licence in Singapore

In June, the MAS (Monetary Authority of Singapore) grants VP Bank Group a banking licence to do business in Singapore. Die VP Bank (Schweiz) AG in Zürich moved from the old stock exchange building to new premises at Bahnhofstrasse 3.

2009: CEO, Adolf E. Real leaves VP Bank / Liechtenstein is taken off the "grey list"

In 2009, Liechtenstein signs thirteen international agreements on cooperation in tax matters, which in turn led to its removal from the so-called "grey list" of the OECD. For Liechtenstein, the treaties with large countries such as the US, Great Britain, Germany and France afforded the greatest positive effect in terms of credibility, reputational gains and legal certainty for clients. The Liechtenstein banks continued to demonstrate their financial strength and stability also in 2009 – compared to their European peers, they stood out for their high equity capital ratios and needed no state support during the financial crisis. In keeping with tradition, they perform no investment banking activities but instead focus on private banking and wealth management.

2010: Roger H. Hartmann named new CEO of VP Bank Group

On 4 February 2010, the board of directors of Verwaltungs- und Privat-Bank Aktiengesellschaft elects Roger H. Hartmann to become the future chief executive officer of VP Bank Group. He took over that post on 1 April 2010 from Fredy Vogt, who had led VP Bank during the past five months on an ad interim basis.

In 2010, VP Bank withdrew from Dubai.

2011: Equipped for the future

Luxembourg becomes the final banking location of VP Bank Group to integrate the Avaloq banking software system. As a result, the products and services of the entire VP Bank Group can be harmonized, making it more efficient and easier to adapt to client needs.

2012: Fredy Vogt becomes new chairman of the board of the VP Bank Group

As previously announced at the 2011 annual general meeting of shareholders, Hans Brunhart, after 18 years of membership on the board of directors and sixteen of which, as its chairman, decides not to stand for re-election. In 2012, Fredy Vogt succeeded him as member and chairman of the board of directors after having been with VP Bank in various functions ever since 1987.

2013: Alfred W. Moeckli becomes new CEO of VP Bank Group

The board of directors names Alfred W. Moeckli to become the new chief executive officer of VP Bank Group. He takes over this function as of 1 May 2013 from Siegbert Näscher, CFO, and Juerg W. Sturzenegger, COO, who co-headed the bank on an ad interim basis since mid-July 2012.

VP Bank initiates takeover of the private banking activities of HSBC Trinkaus & Burkhardt (International) SA as well as its private banking-related fund business in Luxembourg.

2014–2015: VP Bank and Centrum Bank are merging

Continuing its reliance on growth through acquisitions, VP Bank Group takes over Centrum Bank of Vaduz, Liechtenstein, in a merger. In January 2015 VP Bank's acquisition of all share of Centrum Bank has been executed. As of 7 January 2015, Centrum Bank is a subsidiary of VP Bank.

2016–2017: VP Bank celebrates its 60th anniversary / VP Bank launches several extensive digitisation projects

2018–2024: VP Bank successfully pushes ahead with its expansion strategy and repositions itself in terms of personnel

To accelerate its organic growth, VP Bank Group expands its front-office activities in the Swiss market and moves into its new premises at Talstrasse 59 in Zürich on 1 March 2018. One of VP Bank Group’s most important target markets is the Asia/Pacific region. VP Bank opened its Singapore office in 2008 and celebrated its 10th anniversary with 67 employees on 1 September 2018. The licence in Singapore is upgraded from merchant bank to wholesale bank on 1 September 2018, enabling VP Bank in Singapore to expand its product offerings and provide an even broader range of services. VP Fund Solutions and VP Bank take over the fund administration and custodian function of Luxembourg-based Carnegie investment funds. In response to Carnegie Fund Services Ltd's withdrawal from the market, VP Fund Solutions (Luxembourg) SA assumed responsibility for the former management company activities of Carnegie Fund Services Ltd on 1 October 2018. This marks VP Fund Solutions' and VP Bank's successful entry into the Scandinavian market. In November 2018, VP Bank (Switzerland) Ltd celebrates a milestone anniversary, commemorating 30 years in which the Bank has been in Zürich. In the course of the Liechtenstein bank’s internationalisation, VPB Finanz Ltd had been founded in Zürich as a wholly owned subsidiary of VP Bank on 30 November 1988. This was followed by the acquisition of Zurich-based Hügi Bank Ltd in 1998, and VPB Finanz Ltd was subsequently transformed into the fully licensed VP Bank (Switzerland) Ltd. VP Bank (Luxembourg) SA and VP Fund Solutions (Luxembourg) SA were then moved from Avenue de la Liberté to premises on Rue Edward Steichen on the Kirchberg in Luxembourg on 5 November 2018.CEO Alfred W. Moeckli leaves VP Bank Group on 31 January 2019. Dr Urs Monstein, Chief Operating Officer of VP Bank since May 2018, takes over as Head of Group Executive Management on an interim basis with immediate effect. The Luxembourg private banking activities of Catella Bank are acquired by VP Bank (Luxembourg) SA on 1 February 2019, with the takeover announced on 26 October 2018. On 11 July 2019, VP Bank Ltd (Liechtenstein) and Hywin Wealth Management Co., Ltd (China) sign a Memorandum of Understanding for a strategic partnership, announcing their intention to build a joint collaboration platform in Hong Kong to provide asset management to high-net-worth Chinese citizens both inside and outside China. The Board of Directors of VP Bank appoints Paul H. Arni as the new CEO of VP Bank Group on 1 October 2019. At an extraordinary meeting held on 24 April 2020, the Board of Directors of VP Bank Group elects Dr Thomas R. Meier as its new Chairman with immediate effect. Thomas R. Meier had already been a member of the Board of Directors since 2018. VP Bank acquires the private banking business of Öhman Bank S.A. in Luxembourg and further expands its Nordics business. On 1 January 2021, this transaction is successfully completed in the form of an asset deal including takeover of the employees and migration of the client assets. VP Bank officially signs the UN Principles for Responsible Banking (PRB) on 25 March 2021. VP Bank Ltd (Liechtenstein), Hywin Wealth Management Co., Ltd (China) and its subsidiary Hywin Asset Management (Hong Kong) Limited sign a cooperation agreement on 9 March 2021. The strengthening of the strategic partnership is underscored by VP Bank’s 3.4 per cent stake in Hywin Holdings Ltd (“Hywin Holdco”). At the 61st annual general meeting on Friday, 26 April 2024 Stephan Zimmermann was elected Chairman of the Board of Directors by the Board of Directors.

== Milestones ==
- 1956 Founding of the parent bank in Vaduz
- 1974 Introduction of public and employee shares, the first publicly held company in Liechtenstein
- 1983 Listing on the Zurich Stock Exchange (today's SIX Swiss Exchange)
- 1988 Founding of subsidiary companies in Luxembourg and Zürich
- 1995 Founding of subsidiary company on the British Virgin Islands in a joint venture with Allgemeine Treuunternehmen (ATU)
- 2005 Opening of a representative office in Moscow
- 2006 50-year anniversary of VP Bank
- 2007 Opening of VP Wealth Management (Hong Kong) Ltd
- 2008 Opening of VP Bank (Singapore) Ltd
- 2009 Long-standing CEO, Adolf E. Real, leaves VP Bank Group
- 2010 Roger H. Hartmann becomes new CEO of VP Bank Group
- 2012 Fredy Vogt becomes chairman of the board of VP Bank Group
- 2013 Alfred W. Moeckli on 1 May 2013 takes over as new chief executive officer of VP Bank Group
- 2013 VP Bank and Centrum Bank are merging
- 2018 VP Bank Switzerland moves into new premises in Zürich and celebrates its 30th anniversary
- 2018 VP Bank Singapore is expanded from a merchant bank to a wholesale bank
- 2018 VP Fund Solutions and VP Bank take over the fund administration and custodian function of the Luxembourg-based Carnegie investment funds
- 2018 In connection with a review of market development efforts in Russia going forward, we decided to close the representative office in Moscow.
- 2019 VP Bank (Luxembourg) SA takes over Catella Bank
- 2019 Paul H. Arni appointed as the new CEO of VP Bank Group on 1 October 2019
- 2020 Dr Thomas R. Meier elected to the position of Chairman of the Board of Directors of VP Bank Group on 24 April 2020
- 2021 VP Bank acquires the private banking business of Öhman Bank S.A. in Luxembourg
- 2021 VP Bank AG (Liechtenstein) and Hywin Wealth Management Co., Ltd (China) sign collaboration agreement. Another key element in the cooperation is VP Bank's acquisition of a 3.4 per cent stake in Hywin Holdco.
- 2023 In Singapore, VP Bank is honoured as "Best Private Bank - Intermediary Service", celebrates its 15th anniversary and expands its branch with new office premises.
- 2024 Stephan Zimmermann has been elected Chairman of the Board of Directors of VP Bank.
- 2024 VP Bank decided to withdraw from the Hong Kong site for economic reasons. In addition, the partnership with Hywin was terminated.
- 2024 Urs Monstein becomes Chief Executive Officer of VP Bank

== Key figures ==
In 2025, VP Bank Group earned a group net income of CHF 47.0 million. Client assets under management at VP Bank Group totalled CHF 53.7 billion at the end of 2025.

Overview key figures 2025

- Group net income: CHF 47.0 million
- Assets under management: CHF 53.7 billion
- Inflow of net new money: CHF 1.2 billion
- Cost/income ratio: 83.1 percent (total operating expenses / total operating income)
- Tier 1 ratio: 26.1 percent
- Dividend: CHF 4.00 (subject to approval by the annual general meeting)

== VP Fund Solutions ==
The investment fund business is a major focal point of VP Bank's commercial activities. VP Fund Solutions is VP Bank Group's centre of excellence for funds, comprising VP Fund Solutions (Liechtenstein) AG in Liechtenstein and VP Fund Solutions (Luxembourg) SA in Luxembourg.
