= Dieter Walch =

Liechtenstein paediatrician and politician (1940–2021)

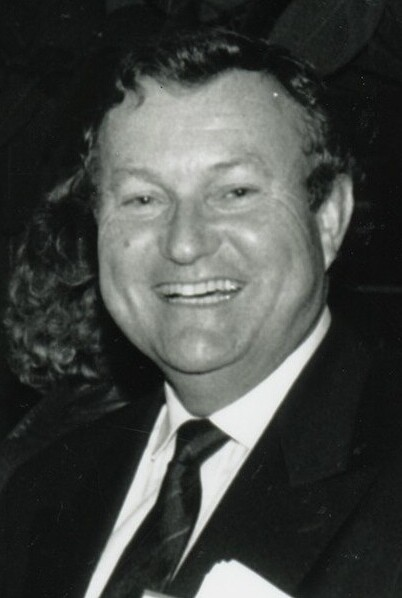
- Walch in 1991

Member of the Landtag of Liechtenstein for Oberland
- In office 7 February 1982 – 24 October 1993

Personal details
- Born: 28 March 1940 Schruns, Austria
- Died: 4 June 2021 (aged 81) Vaduz, Liechtenstein
- Party: Progressive Citizens' Party
- Spouse(s): Christa Licht (m. 1969, divorced) Christa Kalista Scheiman (m. 1992)
- Children: 3

Dieter Walch (28 March 1940 – 4 June 2021) was a paediatrician and politician from Liechtenstein who served in the Landtag of Liechtenstein from 1982 to 1993.

== Life ==
Walch was born on 28 March 1940 in Schruns as the son of Johann Walch and Ilse Anneliese (née Schwohn). He attended secondary school in Bludenz, and then studied medicine at the University of Innsbruck from 1958, where he received a doctorate in 1965.

He ran a medical practice initially in Buchs and then in Vaduz from 1977. He specialised in pediatric and adolescent medicine and was considered a pioneer of the field in Liechtenstein. In 2002, he was awarded the title of princely medical councillor by Hans-Adam II, Prince of Liechtenstein. Walch retired in 2019 and his practice subsequently closed due to no successor being found.

From 1982 to October 1993, Walch served in the Landtag of Liechtenstein as a member of the Progressive Citizens' Party. From 1980 to 1993, he served as the president of the Liechtenstein doctors association.

Walch married Christa Licht on 7 February 1969, and they had three children together, but they got divorced at an unspecified time. He later married Christa Kalista Scheiman on 28 August 1992. He died on 4 June 2021, aged 81.

== Bibliography ==
- Vogt, Paul (1987). 125 Jahre Landtag (in German). Vaduz: Landtag of the Principality of Liechtenstein.
