= 1992 Swiss referendums =

Overview of Swiss referendums held in 1992

Fifteen referendums were held in Switzerland during 1992. The first two were held on 16 February on popular initiatives "for a financially bearable health insurance" and "for the drastic and stepwise limitation of animal experiments." Both were rejected by voters. The next seven were held on 17 May on joining and contributing to the Bretton Woods system (both approved), a federal law on water protection (approved), a popular initiative "for the recovery of our waters" (rejected), a federal resolution on the popular initiative "against the malpractice of gene technology on humans" (approved), a federal resolution on creating a civilian service alternative to military service (approved) and a change to the Strafgesetzbuch and the Military and Penal Codes on sexual integrity (approved).

A third set of six referendums was held on 27 September on a federal resolution on building a transalpine rail route (approved), a federal law on the standing orders of the Federal Assembly (approved), federal laws on the salaries and expenses of members of the Federal Assembly (both rejected), an amendment to the stamp duty law (approved) and a federal law on farmland (approved). The final referendum was held on 6 December on a federal resolution on the European Economic Area (rejected).

== Results ==
Month	Question	For		Against		Blank/invalid		Total	Registered voters	Turnout	Cantons for		Cantons against	
Month	Question	Votes	%	Votes	%	Blank	Invalid	Total	Registered voters	Turnout	Full	Half	Full	Half
February	Popular initiative on health insurance	772,995	39.3	1,195,550	60.7	31,969	4,469	2,004,983	4,515,485	44.4	1	0	19	6
February	Popular initiative on animal experiments	864,898	43.6	1,117,236	56.4	22,854	4,412	2,009,400	4,515,485	44.5	3	1	17	5
May	Joining Bretton Woods	923,685	55.8	730,553	44.2	95,836	3,383	1,753,457	4,519,144	38.8				
May	Contribution to Bretton Woods	929,926	56.4	718,257	43.6	101,607	3,488	1,753,278	4,519,144	38.8				
May	Federal law on water protection	1,151,706	66.1	591,240	33.9	26,233	2,664	1,771,843	4,519,144	39.2				
May	Popular initiative on water protection	644,083	37.1	1,093,987	62.9	31,086	2,566	1,771,722	4,519,144	39.2	0	0	20	6
May	Popular initiative on gene technology	1,271,052	73.8	450,635	26.2	45,657	3,143	1,770,487	4,519,144	39.2	19	6	1	0
May	Civilian service	1,442,263	82.5	305,441	17.5	22,027	2,408	1,772,139	4,519,144	39.2	20	6	0	0
May	Changes to the Strafgesetzbuch	1,255,604	73.1	461,723	26.9	48,500	2,925	1,768,752	4,519,144	39.1				
September	New Railway Link through the Alps (NRLA) proposal	1,305,914	63.6	747,048	36.4	24,945	2,878	2,080,785	4,533,617	45.9				
September	Standing orders of the Federal Assembly	1,097,185	58.0	794,132	42.0	162,708	4,685	2,058,710	4,533,617	45.4				
September	Salary of Federal Assembly members	542,768	27.6	1,424,954	72.4	93,732	3,649	2,065,103	4,533,617	45.6				
September	Expenses of Federal Assembly members	590,484	30.6	1,339,597	69.4	127,774	3,894	2,061,749	4,533,617	45.5				
September	Amendment to the stamp duty law	1,203,579	61.5	771,351	38.5	65,275	3,332	2,070,537	4,533,617	45.7				
September	Law on farmland	1,058,317	53.6	917,091	46.4	90,249	4,054	2,069,711	4,533,617	45.7				
December	Federal resolution on the European Economic Area	1,762,872	49.7	1,786,708	50.3	23,487	7,027	3,580,094	4,546,571	78.7	6	2	14	4
Source: Nohlen

=== EEA referendum result by canton ===
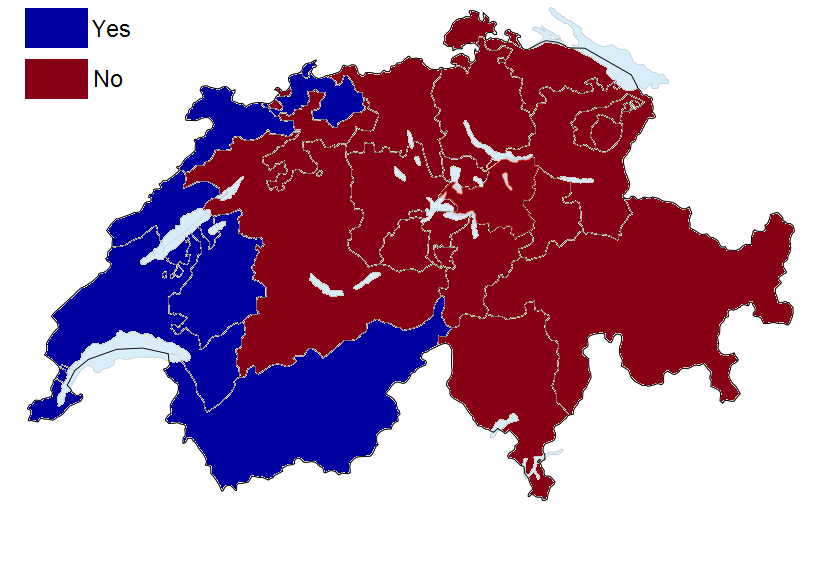
Results by canton

Canton	Yes		No		Invalid/ blank	Total votes	Registered voters	Turnout (%)
Canton	Votes	%	Votes	%	Invalid/ blank	Total votes	Registered voters	Turnout (%)
Zürich	297,503	48.48	316,154	51.52	4,552	618,209	768,126	80.48
Bern	255,224	47.59	281,026	52.41	3,929	540,179	686,459	78.69
Lucerne	70,878	39.31	109,447	60.69	1,289	181,614	224,458	80.91
Uri	4,943	25.13	14,728	74.87	145	19,816	25,290	78.36
Schwyz	17,094	26.69	46,962	73.31	259	64,315	77,278	83.23
Obwalden	4,737	28.20	12,062	71.80	141	16,940	20,713	81.78
Nidwalden	6,957	33.86	13,590	66.14	264	20,811	24,745	84.10
Glarus	6,290	31.95	13,398	68.05	92	19,780	24,814	79.71
Zug	22,037	43.83	28,239	56.17	372	50,648	58,104	87.17
Fribourg	72,101	64.89	39,017	35.11	1,006	112,124	146,744	76.41
Solothurn	56,554	42.59	76,233	57.41	2,389	135,176	161,531	83.68
Basel-Stadt	52,519	55.43	42,226	44.57	818	95,563	132,051	72.37
Basel-Landschaft	68,001	53.18	59,872	46.82	1,229	129,102	161,211	80.08
Schaffhausen	15,810	38.51	25,249	61.49	637	41,696	48,787	85.47
Appenzell Ausserrhoden	10,612	36.73	18,278	63.27	149	29,039	35,204	82.49
Appenzell Innerrhoden	2,397	29.05	5,854	70.95	46	8,297	9,799	84.67
St. Gallen	86,247	38.44	138,103	61.56	1,862	226,212	278,676	81.17
Graubünden	29,821	32.44	62,115	67.56	669	92,605	122,356	75.68
Aargau	101,582	39.94	152,769	60.06	1,541	255,892	335,992	76.16
Thurgau	38,329	35.96	68,265	64.04	829	107,423	134,311	79.98
Ticino	53,488	38.46	85,582	61.54	2,078	141,148	185,138	76.24
Vaud	203,168	78.31	56,288	21.69	1,631	261,087	359,273	72.67
Valais	82,997	55.84	65,636	44.16	2,457	151,090	173,216	87.23
Neuchâtel	61,466	79.96	15,408	20.04	499	77,373	103,399	74.83
Geneva	114,819	78.14	32,120	21.86	1,370	148,309	201,738	73.52
Jura	27,298	77.15	8,087	22.85	261	35,646	47,158	75.59
Source: European Election Database
