= Constitution of the Princely House of Liechtenstein =

The Constitution of the Princely House of Liechtenstein of 26 October 1993 is the basic document that governs the Princely House of Liechtenstein. It was signed by the reigning prince Hans-Adam II and Markus Büchel, Head of Government of Liechtenstein. This princely constitution however is not to be confused with the Constitution of Liechtenstein that was established in 1921. The document sets out things like titles of the members of the Princely House, marriage, adoption, succession to the throne and abdication and renunciation of the right to succeed to the throne. The document opens with a preamble stated below:

For several centuries the Liechtenstein family has been governed by statutes. In parts the old provisions no longer met modern requirements. The family therefore decided on 26 October 1993 to repeal the previous statute and to adopt a new one in keeping with its traditions. These centuries-old family traditions include the Catholic faith, which shall also serve as a guiding principle in future decisions, whilst respecting the freedom of belief and conscience of the individual. We beseech God and the Mother of God to protect our family and our country in the future as they have done in the past.
