= Thomas Büchel =

Deputy Prime Minister of Liechtenstein from 1993 to 1997

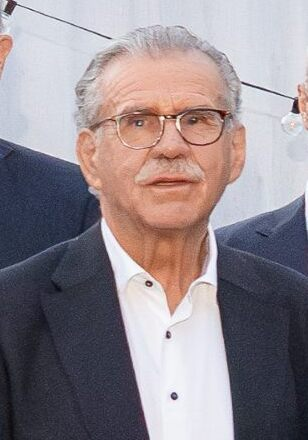
- Büchel in 2025

Deputy Prime Minister of Liechtenstein
- In office 15 December 1993 – 9 April 1997
- Monarch: Hans-Adam II
- Prime Minister: Mario Frick
- Preceded by: Mario Frick
- Succeeded by: Michael Ritter

Member of the Landtag of Liechtenstein for Oberland
- In office 7 February 1993 – 15 December 1993
- Succeeded by: Guido Meier

Personal details
- Born: 15 July 1952 (age 73) Vaduz, Liechtenstein
- Party: Progressive Citizens' Party
- Spouse: Corina Kindle (m. 1977)
- Relations: Alois Büchel (brother)
- Children: 3

Thomas Büchel (born 15 July 1952) is a politician from Liechtenstein who served as the Deputy Prime Minister of Liechtenstein from 1993 to 1997, under the government of Mario Frick. He previously served in the Landtag of Liechtenstein in 1993.

== Early life and career ==
Büchel was born on 15 July 1952 in Vaduz as the son of Hugo Büchel and Elwina (née Hasler) as one of eleven children. He attended secondary school in Vaduz. From 1968 to 1971 he conducted an apprenticeship as a laboratory technician in Schaan, and from 1975 1984 he studied chemistry in Zurich. From 1985 to 1993 he was head of the scientific department at Ivoclar in Schaan and he was a lecturer at the Liechtenstein engineering school from 1986 to 1992.

== Political career ==
He was a member of the Landtag of Liechtenstein in 1993 as a member of the Progressive Citizens' Party. He resigned from the Landtag when he was appointed as Deputy Prime Minister of Liechtenstein on 15 December 1993, under the government of Mario Frick. Additionally, he was the minister of the interior, education, environment, agriculture and forestry.

Büchel was the Progressive Citizens' Party's candidate for Prime Minister of Liechtenstein in the 1997 Liechtenstein general election. The party received 39.2% of the vote, the lowest in its history to that point. Shortly afterwards, the party ended the coalition with the Patriotic Union that had existed since 1938. He was subsequently succeeded by Michael Ritter on 2 February 1997.

== Later life ==
From 1998 to 2000 Büchel was the managing director Thermoselect AG in Liechtenstein. As of 2011, he has been a board member of OLMA-Messen in St. Gallen, and the president of the foundation board of the Liechtenstein state hospital since 2002. He has been a member of the European Commission against Racism and Intolerance since 2004.

== Personal life ==
Büchel married Corina Kindle on 4 April 1977 and they have three children together. His brother Alois Büchel is a notable theatre director.

== Honours ==
- Liechtenstein: Commander's Cross with Star of the Order of Merit of the Principality of Liechtenstein (1994)
