= Sieglinde Gstöhl =

Academic from Liechtenstein

Sieglinde Gstöhl (born 1964) is a Liechtensteiner academic. She is Professor and Director of Studies in the department of EU International Relations and Diplomacy Studies at the College of Europe in Bruges, Belgium. She previously worked at the Institute of Social Sciences at Humboldt University of Berlin.

== Biography ==
Gstöhl currently serves as Director of Studies of the Department of EU International Relations and Diplomacy Studies at the College of Europe in Bruges, Belgium, as well as a professor of international relations. Before joining the College she was assistant professor of international relations from 1999 to 2005 at the Institute of Social Sciences at Humboldt University of Berlin. She completed postdoctoral research at the Liechtenstein Institute. She served on the Scientific Advisory Board for the Liechtenstein Institute from 2020 until 2024, and has served on the Research Advisory Board of the German Institute for International and Security Affairs in Berlin.

Gstöhl studied Public Affairs at the University of St. Gallen, where she graduated in 1988. She later studied International Relations and Political Sciences at the Graduate Institute of International Studies in Geneva. She previously was an International Institutions Fellow at the Centre of International Affairs at Harvard University in Cambridge, Massachusetts.

Gstöhl has published a number of books on the topics of trade policy, European nation relations and global governance.

== Books ==
- The Trade Policy of the European Union. Palgrave, 2018, ISBN 9781349935833.
- Theorizing the European Neighbourhood Policy. Routledge, 2017, ISBN 9781315468679.
- European Union Diplomacy: Coherence, Unity and Effectiveness. Brussels: P.I.E. Peter Lang, 2012, ISBN 978-90-5201-842-3.
- Europe's Near Abroad: Promises and Prospects of the EU's Neighbourhood Policy. Brussels: P.I.E. Peter Lang, 2008, ISBN 978-90-5201-047-2.
- Small States in International Relations. Seattle/Reykjavik: University of Washington and University of Iceland Presses, 2006
- Global Governance und die G8: Gipfelimpulse für Weltwirtschaft und Weltpolitik. Münster: LIT Verlag, 2003
- Reluctant Europeans: Sweden, Norway, and Switzerland in the Process of Integration. Boulder: Lynne Rienner, 2002
- Flexible Integration für Kleinstaaten? Liechtenstein und die Europäische Union. Schaan: Verlag der LAG. (Liechtenstein Politische Schriften, 33), 2001
