= 1995 Liechtenstein European Economic Area membership referendum =

1995 Liechtenstein EEA referendum
- 9 April 1995
- Referendum on membership of the European Economic Area

Results
| Choice | Votes | % |
|---|---|---|
| Yes | 6,412 | 55.88% |
| No | 5,062 | 44.12% |
| Valid votes | 11,474 | 97.91% |
| Invalid or blank votes | 245 | 2.09% |
| Total votes | 11,719 | 100.00% |
| Registered voters/turnout | 14,286 | 82.03% |

A second referendum on membership of the European Economic Area was held in Liechtenstein on 9 April 1995. Although a previous referendum in 1992 had seen the majority of votes (55.8% with a voter turnout of 87%) in favour, the country had not joined the EEA on its formation in 1994. The result of the second referendum, which also included a treaty with neighbouring Switzerland, was 56% in favour of membership, with voter turnout at 82%. Liechtenstein subsequently joined the EEA in May.

== Results ==
| Choice | Votes | % |
|---|---|---|
| For | 6,412 | 55.88 |
| Against | 5,062 | 44.12 |
| Total | 11,474 | 100.00 |
| Valid votes | 11,474 | 97.91 |
| Invalid/blank votes | 245 | 2.09 |
| Total votes | 11,719 | 100.00 |
| Registered voters/turnout | 14,286 | 82.03 |
Source: Nohlen & Stöver
