= Markus Büchel =

Prime Minister of Liechtenstein in 1993

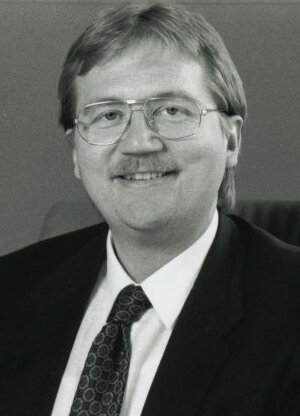
- Official portrait, 1993

Prime Minister of Liechtenstein
- In office 26 May 1993 – 15 December 1993
- Monarch: Hans-Adam II
- Deputy: Mario Frick
- Preceded by: Hans Brunhart
- Succeeded by: Mario Frick

Personal details
- Born: 14 May 1959 Eschen, Liechtenstein
- Died: 9 July 2013 (aged 54) Ruggell, Liechtenstein
- Party: Progressive Citizens' Party
- Spouse: Elena Medvedeva (m. 1998)
- Children: 1

Markus Büchel (German pronunciation: [ˈmaʁkʊs ˈbyːçl̩]; 14 May 1959 – 9 July 2013) was a lawyer and politician from Liechtenstein who served as Prime Minister of Liechtenstein from May to December 1993. A member of the Progressive Citizens' Party (FBP), he was subject to a motion of no confidence in September by his own party. Serving for just under 7 months, he is the shortest serving prime minister in Liechtenstein's history.

== Early life ==
Markus Büchel was born on 14 May 1959 in Eschen as the son of Karl Büchel and Emilie (née Mündle) as one of two children. He attended Realschule in Eschen before conducting an apprenticeship at the law firm of Alfred Bühler in the capital of Vaduz. From 1981, he studied law in Bern and Munich, graduating with a Licentiatus iuris in 1985. From there, he worked in the Liechtenstein Office of Economic Affairs.

== Prime minister of Liechtenstein ==
Büchel was the candidate of the Progressive Citizens' Party (FBP) for Prime Minister of Liechtenstein in the February 1993 elections. In the election campaign, Büchel argued that negogations with Europe (regarding accession to the European Economic Area) should have been conducted with more "force", and also for the reduction of spending. The FBP won the election, and Büchel became prime minister on 26 May 1993, succeeding Hans Brunhart and heading a renewed coalition government between the FBP and the Patriotic Union (VU). Additionally, he also held the government roles of foreign affairs, finance, transport, culture, youth, and sport.

Shortly after taking office, Büchel became strained from the FBP due to a unpredictable political style. In August 1993 he came under controversy due to disagreements with the FBP regarding appointment of the head of the Liechtenstein tax administration. Büchel's appointment, Peter Mella, was rejected by the FBP but was nevertheless appointed due to votes from the VU in the Landtag of Liechtenstein. In response, on 31 August the FBP withdrew confidence in Büchel and publicly called for his resignation as prime minister; the party cited his poor performance in office, untruthfulness, and refusal to work with government colleagues as reasons for the loss in confidence.

On 14 September, a FBP-initiated motion of no confidence in the Landtag against Büchel succeeded 17–8, so the body requested his dismissal. Josef Biedermann was intended to succeed Büchel as prime minister. Instead, Hans Adam II, Prince of Liechtenstein dismissed both the government and the Landtag, and fresh elections were held in October. Büchel was kept in office until a new government was elected, during which time he countersigned the Constitution of the Princely House of Liechtenstein, which had not been discussed in the Landtag. He was succeeded by his deputy Mario Frick of the VU on 15 December 1993.

On the day of the proposed motion of no confidence, Büchel defended himself by asserting that the dispute over the appointment was the only cause of the conflict between him and the FBP, and that it was an internal party issue that was blown out of proportion by the FBP. Furtheremore, he stated that he believed that the constitutional process behind the proposed motion of no confidence was questionable, and that the conflict did not merit his removal from office.

== Later life and personal life ==
From 1997 Büchel worked as a self-employed lawyer. On 22 September 2002, he became the first Honorary Consul of Russia in Liechtenstein.

Büchel married Elena Medvedeva on 7 May 1998, and they had one child together. He was from Ruggell, and died there on 9 July 2013 due to a serious illness, aged 54.

== Honours ==
- Liechtenstein: Grand Cross of the Order of Merit of the Principality of Liechtenstein (1994)

== See also ==
- Politics of Liechtenstein
- Markus Büchel cabinet
