= Michael Ritter =

Deputy Prime Minister of Liechtenstein from 1997 to 2001

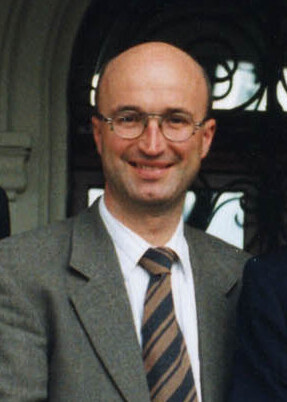
- Ritter in 1997

Deputy Prime Minister of Liechtenstein
- In office 9 April 1997 – 5 April 2001
- Monarch: Hans-Adam II
- Prime Minister: Mario Frick
- Preceded by: Thomas Büchel
- Succeeded by: Rita Kieber-Beck

Personal details
- Born: 4 September 1957 (age 68) Mauren, Liechtenstein
- Party: Patriotic Union
- Spouse: Katja Gey (m. 1993)
- Children: 2

Michael Ritter (born 4 September 1957) is a lawyer and former politician from Liechtenstein who served as the Deputy Prime Minister of Liechtenstein from 1997 to 2001, under the government of Mario Frick. He also served as a government councillor from 1993 to 2001.

== Early life ==
Ritter was born on 4 September 1957 in Mauren as the son of industrialist Walter Ritter and Edeltraud (née) Müller as one of four children. He attended secondary school in Vaduz. He studied law in Bern from 1977 to 1983 and he received a doctorate in 1992. He received the Walter Hug Prize for his dissertation regarding the Liechtenstein civil service law.

== Career ==
From 1984 to 1986 he worked as a legal assistant for the Liechtenstein government. From 1986 to 1989 he was the head of the advisory and complaints office within the government, and then as an international law expert from 1989 to 1992.

Ritter was a government councillor in the Markus Büchel cabinet and First Mario Frick cabinet as a member of the Patriotic Union (VU), with the roles of business, family, health and social services. Following the 1997 elections, the Progressive Citizens' Party (FBP) ended the coalition with the VU that had existed since 1938, and as a result Ritter was appointed Deputy Prime Minister of Liechtenstein, under the government of Mario Frick. Additionally, he held the roles of the interior, education, environment, agriculture and forestry. He did not seek re-election in the 2001 elections and was succeeded by as deputy prime minister by Rita Kieber-Beck on 5 April 2001.

Since 2002, Ritter has worked as a self-employed lawyer in Vaduz. He was vice president of the board of directors of the National Bank of Liechtenstein. As of 2011, he has been a member of the board of directors at the Liechtenstein bar association since 2004.

== Personal life ==
Ritter married Katja Gey on 3 July 1993 and they have two children together. He lives in Eschen.
