= Ernst Walch =

President of the Landtag of Liechtenstein in 1993

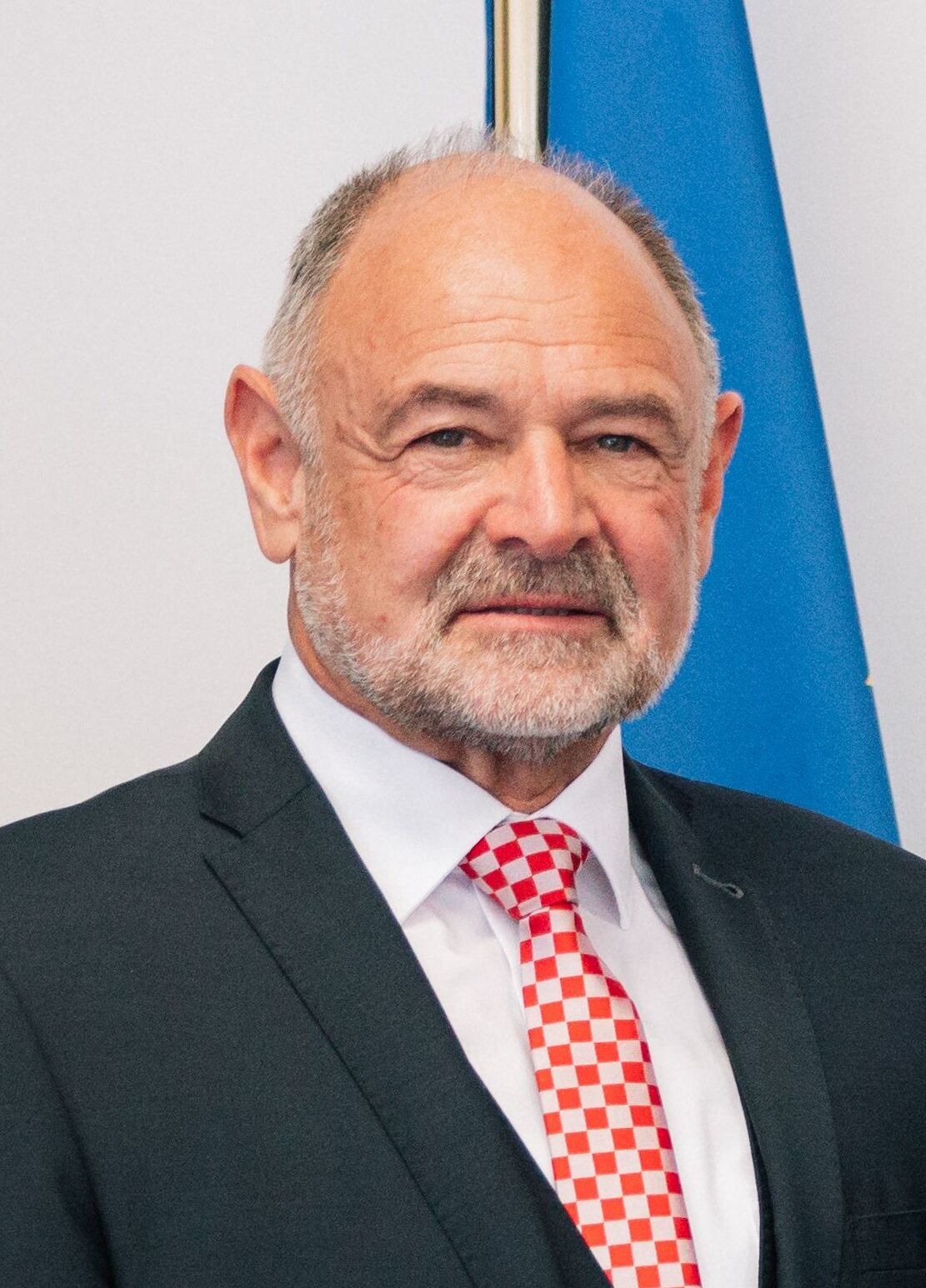
- Walch in 2024

President of the Landtag of Liechtenstein
- In office February 1993 – October 1993
- Monarch: Hans Adam II
- Vice President: Otmar Hasler
- Preceded by: Karlheinz Ritter
- Succeeded by: Paul Kindle

Member of the Landtag of Liechtenstein for Oberland
- In office 2 February 1986 – 1996

Personal details
- Born: 12 May 1956 (age 70) Vaduz, Liechtenstein
- Party: Progressive Citizens' Party
- Spouse: Margrit Keller (m. 1980)
- Children: 6

Ernst Joseph Walch (born 12 May 1956) is a politician from Liechtenstein who served as the President of the Landtag of Liechtenstein in 1993. He also served in the Landtag of Liechtenstein from 1989 to 1996.

== Early life ==
He studied law in Innsbruck, where he earned his doctorate in 1980, and at the New York University School of Law, Graduate Division, Institute of Comparative Law, where he received his Master of Comparative Jurisprudence in 1981. He was admitted to the bar in the United States in 1983 and in Liechtenstein in 1984.

== Career ==
He was a member of the Landtag of Liechtenstein from 1989 to 1996 as a member of the Progressive Citizens' Party. He was the President of the Landtag of Liechtenstein from February 1993 to October 1993. From 1983 to 1993 Walch represented the Progressive Citizens' Party as member of the Steering committee of the European Democrat Union. He served as the Liechtenstein minister of foreign affairs from 2001 to 2005 in the first Otmar Hasler cabinet.

Walch belongs to various professional organizations, including the New York State Bar Association, the Liechtenstein Law Society and the German-Austrian-Swiss Registered Association of Lawyers (DACH). He is also a certified interpreter and translator for English and German. In addition, he has authored numerous publications on international legal issues, notably international commercial law. He is a partner in the Liechtenstein law firm Walch & Schurti.

From 2006 Walch was a member of the board of directors of the Liechtensteiner Volksblatt until it ceased operations in March 2023 due to declining subscriptions and rising costs. On 13 August 2024, the Progressive Citizens' Party nominated Walch for Prime Minister of Liechtenstein in the 2025 Liechtenstein general election. At 68 years old, he is the oldest candidate in Liechtenstein's history.

== Personal life ==
Walch married Margrit Keller on 22 November 1980 and they had six children together.

== Honours ==
- Liechtenstein : Commander's Cross of the Order of Merit of the Principality of Liechtenstein (1994)
