= Andrea Willi =

Liechtenstein politician and government minister

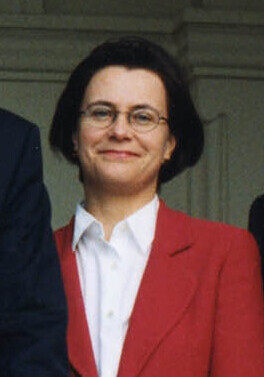
- Willi in 1997

Minister of Foreign Affairs
- In office 1993–2001
- Prime Minister: Mario Frick

Personal details
- Born: 25 May 1955 (age 71) Balzers, Liechtenstein
- Party: Patriotic Union
- Education: University of Zurich (PhD)

Andrea Willi (born 25 May 1955) is a politician from Liechtenstein, and was the first woman to hold the office of Minister of Foreign Affairs. She was appointed to that role in the government of Prime Minister Mario Frick, and held it from 15 December 1993 to 5 April 2001. She is member of the Patriotic Union party. She was also the Ambassador to the United Nations Office at Geneva from 1991 to 1993.

== Life ==
She was born in Balzers and was also the Ambassador to the United Nations Office at Geneva from 1991 to 1993.

Willi earned a PhD in Philosophy at the University of Zurich.

She is member of the Patriotic Union party. She was appointed to that role in the government of Prime Minister Mario Frick, and held it from 15 December 1993 to 5 April 2001. She was the first woman to hold the office of Minister of Foreign Affairs in Liechtenstein.

She was also the Ambassador to the United Nations Office at Geneva from 1991 to 1993.
