= Mario Frick (politician) =

Prime Minister of Liechtenstein from 1993 to 2001

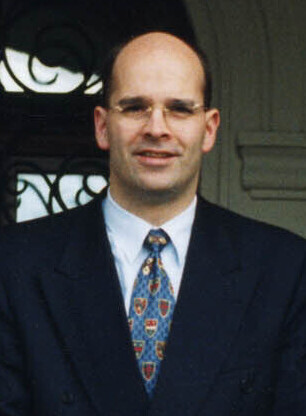
- Frick in 1997

Prime Minister of Liechtenstein
- In office 15 December 1993 – 5 April 2001
- Monarch: Hans-Adam II
- Deputy: Thomas Büchel (1993–1997); Michael Ritter (1997–2001)
- Preceded by: Markus Büchel
- Succeeded by: Otmar Hasler

Deputy Prime Minister of Liechtenstein
- In office 26 May 1993 – 15 December 1993
- Monarch: Hans-Adam II
- Prime Minister: Markus Büchel
- Preceded by: Herbert Wille
- Succeeded by: Thomas Büchel

Personal details
- Born: 8 May 1965 (age 61) Chur, Switzerland
- Party: Patriotic Union
- Spouse: Andrea Haberlander (m. 1992)
- Children: 3

Mario K. Frick (born 8 May 1965) is a politician from Liechtenstein who served as Prime Minister of Liechtenstein from 1993 to 2001. He previously served as the Deputy Prime Minister of Liechtenstein in 1993, under the government of Markus Büchel.

== Early life ==
Frick was born on 8 May 1965 in Chur to trustee Kuno Frick and Melita Kaufmann as one of six children. From 1977 to 1985 he attended high school in Vaduz and proceeded to study law in University of St. Gallen, where he received a diploma in 1989 and finished his doctor thesis 1992.

He was a member of the Balzers municipal council from 1991 to 1993.

== Prime Minister of Liechtenstein ==
Frick was the Deputy Prime Minister of Liechtenstein from May 1993 under Markus Büchel until he resigned in October under pressure from the Progressive Citizens' Party after the Landtag of Liechtenstein withdrew its confidence in him, and Frick became Prime Minister of Liechtenstein. Hans-Adam II subsequently called the October 1993 Liechtenstein general election which resulted in a win for the Patriotic Union. He became Europe's youngest head of government at the time at 28 years old.

During his tenure as prime minister, Liechtenstein entered the European Economic Area after a successful referendum in 1995, and also joined the World Trade Organization the same year.

His term in office also saw the conclusion of the VAT agreement with Switzerland (1994) and accession to the World Trade Organisation (1995). Liberalisation and privatisation took place partly as a result of EEA membership – in the telecommunications sector (privatisation and decoupling from Switzerland from 1998, and the launch of Liechtenstein’s mobile telephony service from 2000), and in the postal sector (amicable termination of the postal agreement with Switzerland in 1999 and the establishment of Liechtensteinische Post AG). There was also an opening up of the market to providers in the healthcare sector, the financial services sector, the commercial sector and the liberal professions (doctors, architects and lawyers).

In 1997, the Progressive Citizens' Party withdrew from the coalition government that had existed since 1938, making his second cabinet the first non-coalition cabinet since then.

=== Constitutional crisis in Liechtenstein (2000–2003) ===
The constitutional crisis arose from a dispute between Prince Hans-Adam II and Liechtenstein's government and parliament over the distribution of political power between the monarchy and elected institutions. Although the disagreement dated back to 1992, it intensified during Mario Frick's premiership and continued after he left office in 2001.

=== Criticism ===
Frick's government was faced with the challenge of the 1999–2001 Liechtenstein financial crisis, where the German Federal Intelligence Service accused various banks, politicians and judges within Liechtenstein of cooperating with organized crime to promote money laundering. These allegations were refuted, but it became apparent that cooperation in response to enquiries relating to the fight against money laundering needed to be significantly improved.

This led to Liechtenstein being blacklisted by the Financial Action Task Force in 2000. As a result, his government oversaw reforms to the Liechtenstein financial sector to combat organized crime and money laundering.

== Legal scholarship ==
Alongside his legal practice, Frick has published on Liechtenstein and international financial law. His scholarship has focused on banking regulation, blockchain legislation, trusts and foundations, asset protection, cross-border recognition and enforcement of judgments, private international law, and succession planning.

His publications have appeared in legal journals and edited volumes, including the Banking Regulation Review, Liechtenstein Journal, Jus & News, and the Handbuch des Vermögensschutzes. In 2022, he co-authored chapters on Liechtenstein's Blockchain Act and the country's banking law, reflecting the development of Liechtenstein as a centre for financial services and digital asset regulation.

== Personal life ==
Frick married Andrea Haberlander (born 11 February 1965) in 1993. The couple divorced on 2 August 2024. On 10 July 2026, he married Christine Reiff.

Frick's brother Jürgen was shot and killed in the underground garage of Frick & Co. Bank in the town of Balzers on 7 April 2014. The shooter, Jürgen Hermann, later shot and killed himself, and his body was found in Lake Constance on the German side of the lake.

== See also ==
- Politics of Liechtenstein
- Mario Frick cabinet
