= 2003 Liechtenstein constitutional referendum =

2003 constitutional referendum regarding the Liechtenstein Prince's powers

- 14 March 2003

Princely Initiative
For	64.32%
Against	35.68%

Constitution Peace Initiative
For	16.56%
Against	83.44%
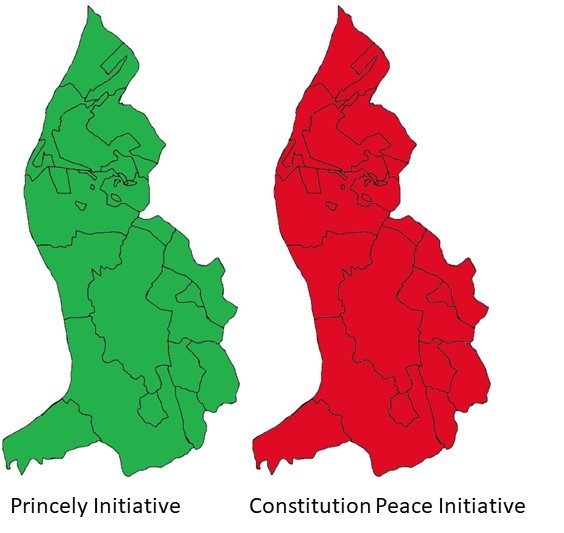
- Results by municipality

A constitutional referendum regarding the prince's powers was held in Liechtenstein on 14 March 2003. The referendum had two questions: a "Princely Initiative" and a "Constitution Peace Initiative". The first question passed with 64.32% in favour and the second question was rejected by 83.44% of voters.

The Princely Initiative asked voters whether to approve an extension of the power of the prince to dismiss the government, nominate judges and veto legislation. The Constitution Peace Initiative asked voters whether to approve or disapprove of constitutional modifications, including modifications which would have restricted the prince's powers.

The BBC stated that the referendum in effect made Liechtenstein into an "absolute monarchy". In December 2002 the Venice commission of the Council of Europe published a comprehensive report analysing the amendments, opining that they were not compatible with the European standard of democracy.

Prince Hans-Adam II had threatened to leave the country and live in exile in Vienna, Austria if the voters had chosen to restrict his powers.

After the votes were counted, the prince told a local radio station: "It's an excellent result. We can be very pleased with it."

== Results ==
Question	For		Against		Invalid/ blank	Total votes	Registered voters	Turnout	Outcome
Question	Votes	%	Votes	%	Invalid/ blank	Total votes	Registered voters	Turnout	Outcome
Princely Initiative	9,412	64.32	5,221	35.68	212	14,845	16,932	87.67%	Approved
Constitution Peace Initiative	2,394	16.56	12,065	83.44	386	14,845	16,932	87.67%	Rejected
Source: Nohlen & Stöver
