= List of members of the Landtag of Liechtenstein (2001–2005) =

Members of the Landtag of Liechtenstein in the 40th legislature

2001–2005 Landtag of Liechtenstein
| ← | 1997–2001 Landtag | 2005–2009 Landtag | → |

Overview
- Term: 11 February 2001 – 13 March 2005
- Election: 2001 Liechtenstein general election
- Government: First Otmar Hasler cabinet

Landtag of Liechtenstein
- Members: 25
- President: Klaus Wanger
- Vice president: Peter Wolff
- Prime minister: Otmar Hasler
- Deputy prime minister: Rita Kieber-Beck

Prince Hans-Adam II

The 2001 Liechtenstein general election was held between 9 and 11 February 2001 to elect the 25 members of the Landtag. It was the 40th legislative term, and ended on 13 March 2005.

The Landtag consists of the elected members, who then elect the president and the government. The composition was an absolute majority for the Progressive Citizens' Party (FBP); the Patriotic Union VU subsequently moved into the opposition.

Members Adrian Hasler and Otto Büchel resigned and were succeeded.

== Composition ==
| Party | Seats |
|---|---|
| Progressive Citizens' Party | 13 |
| Patriotic Union | 11 |
| Free List | 1 |
| Total | 25 |
Source: Landtagswahlen 2001

== List of members ==
| Constituency | Affiliation | Name | Notes |
|---|---|---|---|
| Oberland | Patriotic Union | Peter Sprenger | President of the Landtag |
| Oberland | Patriotic Union | Peter Wolff | |
| Oberland | Patriotic Union | Walter Hartmann | |
| Oberland | Patriotic Union | Erich Sprenger | Newcomer |
| Oberland | Patriotic Union | Hugo Quaderer | Newcomer |
| Oberland | Patriotic Union | Dorothée Laternser | Newcomer |
| Oberland | Patriotic Union | Walter Vogt | Newcomer |
| Oberland | Progressive Citizens' Party | Alois Beck | |
| Oberland | Progressive Citizens' Party | Peter Lampert | Newcomer |
| Oberland | Progressive Citizens' Party | Klaus Wanger | President of the Landtag |
| Oberland | Progressive Citizens' Party | Helmut Konrad | |
| Oberland | Progressive Citizens' Party | Wendelin Lampert | Newcomer |
| Oberland | Progressive Citizens' Party | Elmar Kindle | |
| Oberland | Progressive Citizens' Party | Adrian Hasler | Newcomer. Resigned on 31 March 2004 |
| Oberland | Progressive Citizens' Party | Marco Ospelt | Succeeded Adrian Hasler on 14 April 2004 |
| Oberland | Free List | Paul Vogt | |
| Unterland | Patriotic Union | Ingrid Hassler-Gerner | |
| Unterland | Patriotic Union | Donath Oehri | |
| Unterland | Patriotic Union | Otto Büchel | Resigned on 17 September 2003 |
| Unterland | Patriotic Union | Ivo Klein | Newcomer |
| Unterland | Patriotic Union | Alexander Marxer | Newcomer. Succeeded Alexander Marxer on 17 September 2003 |
| Unterland | Progressive Citizens' Party | Johannes Kaiser | Newcomer |
| Unterland | Progressive Citizens' Party | Renate Wohlwend | |
| Unterland | Progressive Citizens' Party | Markus Büchel | |
| Unterland | Progressive Citizens' Party | Rudolf Lampert | |
| Unterland | Progressive Citizens' Party | Jürgen Zech | Newcomer |
| Unterland | Progressive Citizens' Party | Helmut Bühler | Newcomer |
