= List of members of the Landtag of Liechtenstein (1997–2001) =

Members of the Landtag of Liechtenstein in the 39th legislature

1997–2001 Landtag of Liechtenstein
←	1993–1997 Landtag	2001–2005 Landtag	→

Overview
- Term: 2 February 1997 – 11 February 2001
- Election: 1997 Liechtenstein general election
- Government: Second Mario Frick cabinet

Landtag of Liechtenstein
- Members: 25
- President: Peter Wolff
- Vice president: Otmar Hasler
- Prime minister: Mario Frick
- Deputy prime minister: Michael Ritter

Prince Hans-Adam II

The 1997 Liechtenstein general election was held on 2 February 1997 to elect the 25 members of the Landtag. It was the 39th legislative term, and ended on 11 February 2001.

The Landtag consists of the elected members, who then elect the president and the government. The composition was the lowest result in the Progressive Citizens' Party's history to that point, and it subsequently ended the coalition with the Patriotic Union, who had won a majority of thirteen seats, that had existed since 1938 and moved into the opposition.

Member Gebhard Hoch died in office on 28 June 2000 and was succeeded.

== Composition ==
Party	Seats
Patriotic Union	13
Progressive Citizens' Party	10
Free List	2
Total	25
Source: Liechtensteiner Volksblatt

== List of members ==
Constituency	Municipality	Affiliation	Name	Notes
Oberland	Schaan	Patriotic Union	Peter Wolff	President of the Landtag
Oberland	Vaduz	Patriotic Union	Karlheinz Ospelt	
Oberland	Triesen	Patriotic Union	Peter Sprenger	
Oberland	Triesenberg	Patriotic Union	Hubert Sele	
Oberland	Vaduz	Patriotic Union	Walter Hartmann	
Oberland	Balzers	Patriotic Union	Norbert Bürzle	
Oberland	Vaduz	Patriotic Union	Volker Rheinberger	
Oberland	Schaan	Patriotic Union	Lorenz Heeb	
Oberland	Triesenberg	Progressive Citizens' Party	Alois Beck	
Oberland	Triesen	Progressive Citizens' Party	Gebhard Hoch	Died 28 June 2000
Oberland	Balzers	Progressive Citizens' Party	Christian Brunhart	Succeeded Gebhard Hoch on 13 September 2000
Oberland	Schaan	Progressive Citizens' Party	Klaus Wanger	
Oberland	Vaduz	Progressive Citizens' Party	Marco Ospelt	
Oberland	Triesen	Progressive Citizens' Party	Elmar Kindle	
Oberland	Schaan	Progressive Citizens' Party	Helmut Konrad	
Oberland	Balzers	Free List	Paul Vogt	
Unterland	Eschen	Patriotic Union	Ingrid Hassler-Gerner	
Unterland	Eschen	Patriotic Union	Oswald Kranz	
Unterland	Ruggell	Patriotic Union	Otto Büchel	
Unterland	Gamprin	Patriotic Union	Donath Oehri	
Unterland	Schellenberg	Patriotic Union	Hansjörg Goop	
Unterland	Gamprin	Progressive Citizens' Party	Otmar Hasler	Vice president of the Landtag
Unterland	Ruggell	Progressive Citizens' Party	Johannes Matt	
Unterland	Eschen	Progressive Citizens' Party	Gabriel Marxer	
Unterland	Mauren	Progressive Citizens' Party	Rudolf Lampert	
Unterland	Mauren	Free List	Egon Matt	
