= 2005 Liechtenstein general election =

- 13 March 2005
- All 25 seats in the Landtag; 13 seats needed for a majority
- Turnout: 86.45% (▲0.34pp)
Party	Leader	Vote %	Seats	+/–
FBP	Otmar Hasler	48.74	12	−1
VU	Bernd Hammermann	38.23	10	−1
FL	Pepo Frick	13.03	3	+2
This lists parties that won seats. See the complete results below.
Vote share by municipality
Prime Minister before	Prime Minister after
Otmar Hasler; FBP	Otmar Hasler; FBP

General elections were held in Liechtenstein on 13 March 2005 to elect the 25 members of the Landtag. The Progressive Citizens' Party (FBP) remained the largest party in the Landtag but lost its majority, winning twelve seats, with the Patriotic Union (VU) winning ten. The Free List (FL) won three seats. Voter turnout was 86.5%.

Incumbent prime minister, Otmar Hasler of the FBP, sought re-election for a second term, while the VU nominated Bernd Hammermann for the position. Following the elections, the FBP and VU formed a coalition government, which had previously ended in 1997, ultimately under the leadership of Hasler. The new government was sworn in on 21 April 2005. The election was the first FBP-led government to be re-elected since the 1966 elections.

== Background ==
In the 2001 elections the Progressive Citizens' Party (FBP) gained a majority of thirteen seats, whereas the Patriotic Union (VU) won eleven seats, and the Free List won one seat. The VU subsequently moved into the opposition and the FBP formed a single-party government, with Otmar Hasler becoming prime minister.

Hasler's term in office oversaw the ending of the 1999–2001 financial crisis and reforms to Liechtenstein's financial centre to adhere to international standards. His term was also marked by the 2003 constitutional referendum, where it was proposed that Hans-Adam II, Prince of Liechtenstein be given wider powers to appoint judges and rights to dismiss the government and Landtag. Hasler supported the proposed changes, and they were ultimately accepted by voters. Hans-Adam II had threatened to leave the country and live in Austria should the changes not have been accepted.

Otto Büchel of the VU resigned from the Landtag in September 2003 for health reasons and was succeeded by Alexander Marxer. In addition, Adrian Hasler of the FBP resigned in March 2004 to become chief of the National Police and was succeeded by Marco Ospelt.

== Landtag members not running for re-election ==
Member	Constituency	First elected	Party
Peter Sprenger	Oberland	1997	Patriotic Union
Peter Wolff	Oberland	Feb 1993	Patriotic Union
Walter Hartmann	Oberland	Feb 1993	Patriotic Union
Erich Sprenger	Oberland	2001	Patriotic Union
Marco Ospelt	Oberland	2004	Progressive Citizens' Party
Helmut Konrad	Oberland	1997	Progressive Citizens' Party
Donath Oehri	Unterland	1997	Patriotic Union
Ingrid Hassler-Gerner	Unterland	Oct 1993	Patriotic Union
Jürgen Zech	Unterland	2001	Progressive Citizens' Party

== Electoral system ==
The 25 members of the Landtag are elected by open list proportional representation from two constituencies, Oberland with 15 seats and Unterland with 10 seats. Voters voted for a party list and then may have struck through candidates for whom they did not wish to cast a preferential vote, and may also have added names of candidates from other lists. The electoral threshold to win a seat was 8%. Landtag members sit for a four-year term. Once formed, the Landtag elected the prime minister and two government councillors who were then appointed by the reigning prince to govern in a cabinet. Voting was compulsory by law, and those who failed to vote without a valid reason may be fined, but it was not enforced. Polling stations were open for one and a half hours on election day; the elections were first where voting could be carried out via post. Citizens over 18 years of age who had been a resident in the country for at least one month prior to election day were eligible to vote.

== Campaign ==
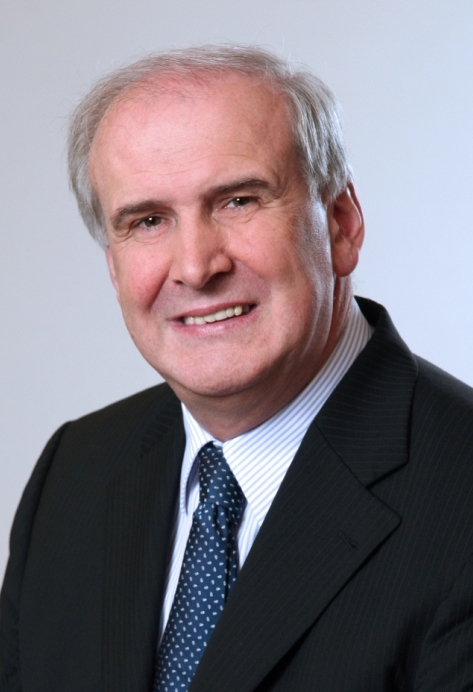
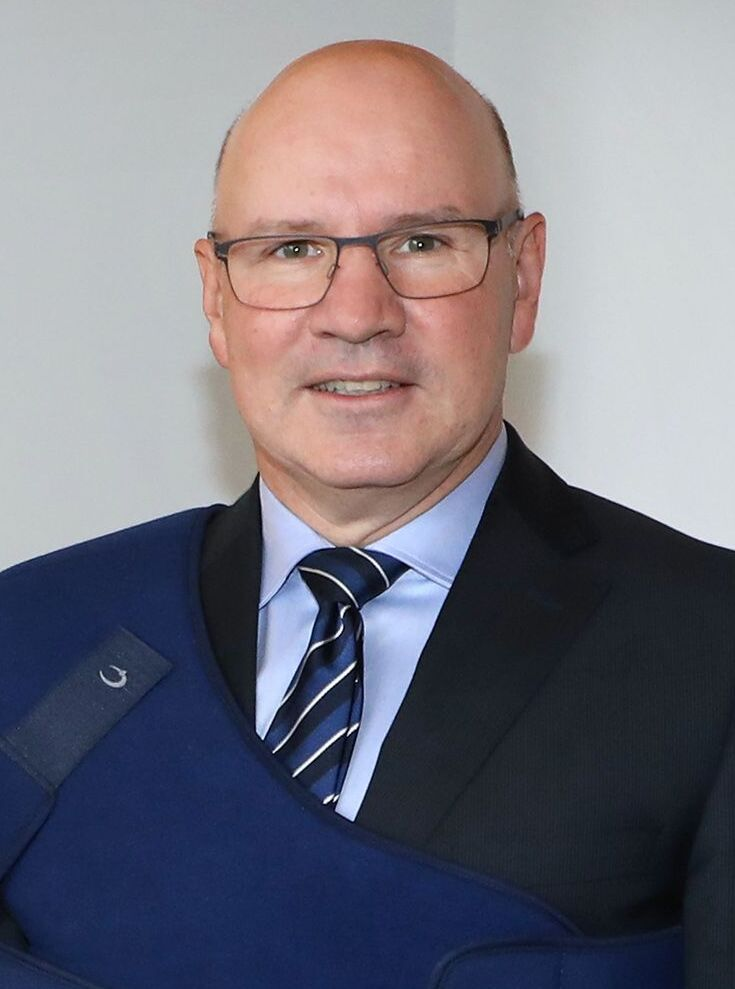
Otmar Hasler (left) and Bernd Hammermann (right) were the FBP and VU's respective nominations for prime minister

Hasler was expected to seek a second term and was renominated by the FBP on 19 November 2004. Additionally, the FBP nominated Martin Meyer and incumbent deputy prime minister Rita Kieber-Beck as government candidates. The party aimed to maintain its majority in the Landtag and stated that it was open to the formation of a coalition government. The party campaigned on maintaining the current course of Hasler's government.

The VU nominated Bernd Hammermann, a journalist from Schellenberg, for prime minister on 18 October 2004. Additionally, the party nominated Maja Marxer-Schädler and Klaus Tschütscher as government candidates. The party stated that it was open to the formation of a coalition government; it campaigned broadly on a people-focused economy and investing in education.

Major issues of the election were unemployment, reform of vocational education, and welfare. In a debate on 26 February 2005, Hammermann criticized Hasler's government for acting inconsistently and not reforming enough, focusing on shortcomings in healthcare and social policy, stating that Liechtenstein needed to "change". On the other hand, Hasler focused on his achievements in office and criticized Hammermann for a lack of political experience.

The Free List presented its Landtag candidates in December 2004; the party stated that it was open to the formation of a coalition government, but the FBP and VU rejected this. The party campaigned on allowing for foreigners to be naturalized in Liechtenstein after 15 years of residency rather than 30 and opposed the raising of insurance premiums.

== Opinion polls ==
Source	Date	VU	FBP	FL	Other
Patriotic Union	January 2005	40%	39%	21%	—

== Candidates ==
Candidates had the same eligibility criteria as voters. Political parties in Liechtenstein required the support of 30 voters from a constituency to be eligible to nominate a candidate list in it. A total of 60 candidates contested the election; 41 men and 19 women.

Oberland	FBP	VU	FL
Oberland	Alois Beck; Peter Lampert; Wendelin Lampert; Elmar Kindle; Klaus Wanger; Doris Frommelt; Josy Biedermann; Thomas Gstöhl; Urs Vogt; Christa Eberle; Krt Eberle; Patrick Schürmann; Hansrudi Sele; Angelika Tinner-Wolf; Monika Forster	Hugo Quaderer; Arthur Brunhart; Gebhard Negele; Heinz Vogt; Jürgen Beck; Harry Quaderer; Henrik Caduff; Rony Bargetze; Ronald Büchel; Ursula Schädler; Christian Ritter; Barbara Ritter-Hagen; Waltraud Schlegel-Biedermann; Corina Beck; Conny Bieri-Frommelt	Pepo Frick; Paul Vogt; Claudia Heeb-Fleck; Georg Kaufmann; Hansjörg Hilti; Luzia Walch-Schädler; Werner Schädler
Unterland	FBP	VU	FL
Unterland	Markus Büchel; Renate Wohlwend; Johannes Kaiser; Franz Heeb; Rudolf Lampert; Adrian Gstöhl; Herbert Kind; Monica Bereiter-Amann; Helmut Bühler; Fredi Hilti	Ivo Klein; Günther Kranz; Doris Beck; Marlies Amann-Marxer; Alexander Marxer; Ursula Diana Oehry; Peter Kranz; Peter Frommelt Hannes; Horst Lorenz; Hannes Clavadetscher	Andrea Matt; Wolfgang Marxer; Stefanie Von Grünigen-Sele
Source: Landtagswahlen 2005

== Results ==
The FBP received 48.8% of the vote, a 1.1% decrease from their 2001 performance, and won twelve seats in the Landtag, a decrease of one. The VU received 38.2% of the vote, a 3.4% decrease from 2001, and won ten seats, a decrease of one. The Free List saw its vote share increase from 9.7% to 13% from 2001 and won three seats, an increase of two.

A total of 15,070 ballots were cast, resulting in a 86.5% voter turnout.

Party	Votes	%	Seats	+/–
Progressive Citizens' Party	94,545	48.74	12	–1
Patriotic Union	74,162	38.23	10	–1
Free List	25,273	13.03	3	+2
Total	193,980	100.00	25	0
Valid votes	14,663	97.32		
Invalid/blank votes	404	2.68		
Total votes	15,067	100.00		
Registered voters/turnout	17,428	86.45		
Source: Landtagswahlen 2005

=== By electoral district ===
Electoral district	Seats	Electorate	Party	Elected members	Substitutes	Votes	%	Swing	Seats won	+/–
Oberland	15	11,499	Progressive Citizens' Party	Alois Beck; Peter Lampert; Wendelin Lampert; Elmar Kindle; Klaus Wanger; Doris Frommelt; Josy Biedermann	Thomas Gstöhl; Urs Vogt	66,389	46.7	▼1.4	7	0
Oberland	15	11,499	Patriotic Union	Hugo Quaderer; Arthur Brunhart; Gebhard Negele; Heinz Vogt; Jürgen Beck; Harry Quaderer	Henrik Caduff; Rony Bargetze	55,372	39.0	▼3.3	6	▼1
Oberland	15	11,499	Free List	Pepo Frick; Paul Vogt	Claudia Heeb-Fleck	20,319	14.3	▲4.7	2	▲1
Unterland	10	5,929	Progressive Citizens' Party	Markus Büchel; Renate Wohlwend; Johannes Kaiser; Franz Heeb; Rudolf Lampert	Adrian Gstöhl	28,156	54.3	▼0.6	5	▼1
Unterland	10	5,929	Patriotic Union	Ivo Klein; Günther Kranz; Doris Beck; Marlies Amann-Marxer	Alexander Marxer	18,790	36.2	▼2.5	4	0
Unterland	10	5,929	Free List	Andrea Matt	Wolfgang Marxer	4,954	9.5	▲3.1	1	▲1
Source: Landtagswahlen 2005

== Aftermath ==
Following the election, the FBP invited the VU to begin negotiations for a renewed coalition government, which the VU accepted. In late March, Hammermann resigned as a government candidate, and in early April the VU leadership removed Marxer-Schädler as a government candidate; the latter of which drew criticism from the newspaper Liechtensteiner Volksblatt as a “slap in the face” for women in Liechtenstein politics. Instead, the party nominated Hugo Quaderer for government, and as such he resigned his seat in the Landtag. The FBP and VU entered into a renewed coalition government ultimately under the leadership of Hasler. As the junior party in the coalition, Tschütscher became deputy prime minister. The new government was sworn in on 21 April 2005.

It was postulated by Wilfried Marxer of the Liechtenstein Institute that the success of the FBP came from Hasler being a significantly more popular candidate than Hammermann. He also concluded that the 2003 constitutional referendum had a minimal effect on voting behaviour, with voter partisanship remaining largely unchanged from the 2001 elections regardless of whether one supported their party's stance on the referendum or not.

== See also ==
- Elections in Liechtenstein
- List of Liechtenstein general elections

== Bibliography ==
- Nohlen, Dieter; Stöver, Philip (2010). Elections in Europe: A data handbook. Nomos. ISBN 978-3-8329-5609-7.
- Marxer, Wilfried (2005). Einflüsse der Verfassungsabstimmung auf die Landtagswahlen 2005 – Thesen, Befunde, Interpretationen (PDF) (in German). Bendern: Liechtenstein-Institut.
- Marxer, Wilfried (2000). Wahlverhalten und Wahlmotive im Fürstentum Liechtenstein (PDF) (in German). Vaduz: Verlag der Liechtensteinischen Akademischen Gesellschaft. ISBN 3-7211-1044-7.
