= 2001 Liechtenstein general election =

- 9–11 February 2001
- All 25 seats in the Landtag; 13 seats needed for a majority
- Turnout: 86.11% (▼0.66pp)
Party	Leader	Vote %	Seats	+/–
FBP	Otmar Hasler	49.90	13	+3
VU	Mario Frick	41.35	11	−2
FL	Pepo Frick	8.76	1	−1
This lists parties that won seats. See the complete results below.
Vote share by municipality
Prime Minister before	Prime Minister after
Mario Frick; VU	Otmar Hasler; FBP

General elections were held in Liechtenstein between 9 and 11 February 2001 to elect the 25 members of the Landtag. The Progressive Citizens' Party (FBP) won a majority of thirteen seats, with the Patriotic Union (VU) winning eleven. The Free List (FL) won one seat. Voter turnout was 86.1%.

Incumbent prime minister, Mario Frick of the VU, sought re-election for a third term, while the FBP nominated Otmar Hasler for the position. Following the elections, Frick resigned and VU moved into the opposition; the FBP subsequently formed a single-party majority government under the leadership of Hasler. The new government was sworn in on 5 April 2001. The election is the most recent to result in a single-party government.

== Background ==
In the 1997 elections the Patriotic Union (VU) maintained a majority of thirteen seats, whereas the Progressive Citizens' Party (FBP) won ten seats, and the Free List won two seats. The FBP subsequently ended the coalition government with the VU that had been in effect since 1938, and the VU formed a single-party majority government with Mario Frick continuing as prime minister.

Frick's second term was marked by liberalizations and privatizations in telecommunications, such as the founding of Liechtensteinische Post in 1999. However, starting from late 1999 the 1999–2001 financial crisis took place; the German Federal Intelligence Service accused several banks, politicians, and judges of cooperating with organized crime to promote money laundering, leading to Liechtenstein being blacklisted by the Financial Action Task Force in 2000. The crisis prompted Frick's government to implement reforms in Liechtenstein's financial centre and expanding the courts to combat money laundering.

Gebhard Hoch of the FBP died in office in June 2000 and was succeeded by Christian Brunhart.

== Electoral system ==
The 25 members of the Landtag are elected by open list proportional representation from two constituencies, Oberland with 15 seats and Unterland with 10 seats. Voters voted for a party list and then may have struck through candidates for whom they did not wish to cast a preferential vote, and may also have added names of candidates from other lists. The electoral threshold to win a seat was 8%. Landtag members sit for a four-year term. Landtag members sit for a four-year term. Once formed, the Landtag elected the prime minister and two government councillors who were then appointed by the reigning prince to govern in a cabinet. Voting was compulsory by law, and those who failed to vote without a valid reason may be fined, but it was not enforced. Polling stations are open only for one and a half hours on election day. Citizens had to have resided in the country for at least one month prior to election day to be eligible to vote; the voting age had been lowered from 20 to 18 since the 1997 elections.

== Campaign ==
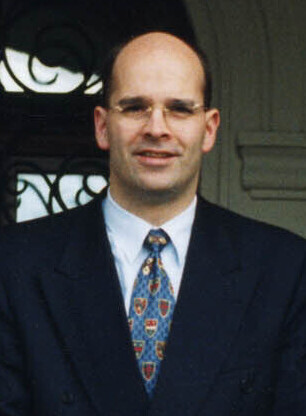
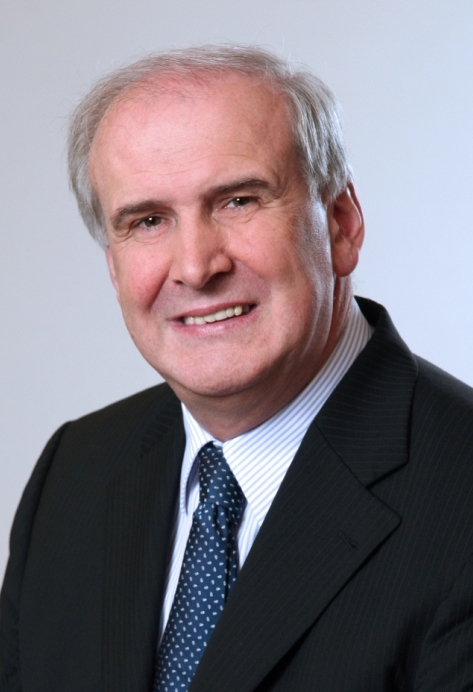
Mario Frick (left) and Otmar Hasler (right) were the VU and FBP's respective nominations for prime minister

The VU re-nominated Frick for prime minister on 30 October 2000. The party aimed to maintain its majority in the Landtag and continue its single-party majority government; the party nominated incumbent government councillors Andrea Willi and Norbert Marxer, alongside Egon Gstöhl and Gerald Marxer as government candidates. The party campaigned on maintaining economic stability and greater involvement in international organizations, particularly the European Economic Area.

The FBP nominated incumbent Vice president of the Landtag Otmar Hasler for prime minister on 18 October 2000. Additionally, the party nominated Rita Kieber-Beck and Ernst Walch as government candidates. Hasler stated in an interview with Radio Liechtenstein that he was open to the formation of a coalition government, but later stated that the party was aiming for a majority in the Landtag. The FBP criticized the VU government for shortcomings in the justice system and accused it for failing to address issues previously brought to attention by the Landtag.

Major issues of the election were the constitution, the cost of health insurance, and the underperformance of the telephone system since its liberalization. In particular, the proposed changes to the constitution by Hans-Adam II, Prince of Liechtenstein, intended to clear ambiguities highlighted in the 1992 constitutional crisis, faced controversy; the proposal would give the prince wider powers to appoint judges and rights to dismiss the government and Landtag. The prince and Landtag's constitutional commission did not come to a compromise by the end of the Landtag's legislative term in December 2000. As such, the issue was set to resolved by the next elected Landtag. Frick's government and VU politicians such as Peter Sprenger opposed the proposed changes.

The Free List presented its Landtag candidates on 1 December 2000; in a press conference on the same day, party president Pepo Frick stated that there were no "fundamental reservations" about forming a coalition government. The party sought to win more than two seats in the Landtag and challenge the two-party system between the VU and FBP; it campaigned on environmental protection and social justice.

== Candidates ==
Candidates had the same eligibility criteria as voters. Political parties in Liechtenstein required the support of 30 voters from a constituency to be eligible to nominate a candidate list in it. A total of 62 candidates contested the election; 41 men and 21 women.

Oberland	FBP	VU	FL
Oberland	Alois Beck; Peter Lampert; Klaus Wanger; Helmut Konrad; Wendelin Lampert; Elmar Kindle; Adrian Hasler; Marco Ospelt; Christian Brunhart; Bettina Kaiser; Anja Meier-Eberle; Gottlieb Risch; Ruth Büchel; Stephan Banzer; Christian Goop	Peter Sprenger; Peter Wolff; Walter Hartmann; Erich Sprenger; Hugo Quaderer; Dorothée Laternser; Walter Vogt; Rudolf Hagen; Roland Büchel; Bernadette Brunhart; Alexander Sele; Remo Vogt; Marion Seeger; Maja Marxer-Schädler; Heike Walser	Paul Vogt; Christel Hilti-Kaufmann; Regina Frick; Ingrid Kaufmann-Sele; Daniela Meier-Wille; Mona Gross; Monika Kunz-Frick; Sigvard Wohlwend
Unterland	FBP	VU	FL
Unterland	Johannes Kaiser; Renate Wohlwend; Markus Büchel; Rudolf Lampert; Jürgen Zech; Helmut Bühler; Monica Bereiter-Amann; Eduard Büchel; Gerlinde Büchel; Alois Blank	Ingrid Hassler-Gerner; Donath Oehri; Otto Büchel; Ivo Klein; Alexander Marxer; Peter Kranz; Doris Beck-Büchel; Hansjörg Büchel; Ursula Diana Oehry; Günther Wohlwend	Adolf Ritter; Doris Hassler; Erwin Gassner; Robert Kind
Source: Landtagswahlen 2001

== Results ==
The FBP received 49.9% of the vote, a 10.7% increase from their 1997 performance, and won a majority of thirteen seats in the Landtag. The VU received 41.6% of the vote, a 7.6% decrease from 1997, and won eleven seats at a decrease of two. The Free List saw its vote share decrease from 11.6% to 8.7% from 1997 and won one seat, at a decrease of one. The election results were the first to be released on the internet.

A total of 14,079 ballots were cast, resulting in a 86.1% voter turnout.

Party	Votes	%	Seats	+/–
Progressive Citizens' Party	92,204	49.90	13	+3
Patriotic Union	76,402	41.35	11	–2
Free List	16,184	8.76	1	–1
Total	184,790	100.00	25	0
Valid votes	13,919	98.86		
Invalid/blank votes	160	1.14		
Total votes	14,079	100.00		
Registered voters/turnout	16,350	86.11		
Source: Landtagswahlen 2001

=== By electoral district ===
Electoral district	Seats	Electorate	Party	Elected members	Substitutes	Votes	%	Swing	Seats won	+/–
Oberland	15	10,961	Progressive Citizens' Party	Alois Beck; Peter Lampert; Klaus Wanger; Helmut Konrad; Wendelin Lampert; Elmar Kindle; Adrian Hasler	Marco Ospelt; Christian Brunhart	65,878	48.2	▲10.6	7	▲1
Oberland	15	10,961	Patriotic Union	Peter Sprenger; Peter Wolff; Walter Hartmann; Erich Sprenger; Hugo Quaderer; Dorothée Laternser; Walter Vogt	Rudolf Hagen; Roland Büchel	57,816	42.3	▼8.7	7	▼1
Oberland	15	10,961	Free List	Paul Vogt	Christel Hilti-Kaufmann	13,106	9.6	▼1.9	1	0
Unterland	10	5,389	Progressive Citizens' Party	Johannes Kaiser; Renate Wohlwend; Markus Büchel; Rudolf Lampert; Jürgen Zech; Helmut Bühler	Monica Bereiter-Amann	26,326	54.9	▲10.6	6	▲2
Unterland	10	5,389	Patriotic Union	Ingrid Hassler-Gerner; Donath Oehri; Otto Büchel; Ivo Klein	Alexander Marxer	18,586	38.7	▼5.9	4	▼1
Unterland	10	5,389	Free List	–	–	3,078	6.4	▼4.8	0	▼1
Source: Landtagswahlen 2001

== Aftermath ==
Following the election, Frick and his government resigned. The FBP invited the VU to begin negotiations for the formation of a coalition government; however, on 22 March the VU party delegates voted 50 in favour and 224 against of forming a coalition with the FBP, and as a result the VU subsequently entered into the opposition. In response, the FBP nominated Alois Ospelt and Hansjörg Frick as additional government candidates, and the party formed a single-party majority government under the leadership of Hasler with Kieber-Beck as deputy prime minister. The new government was sworn in on 5 April 2001. The election is the most recent to result in a single-party in government.

According to a survey published by the Liechtenstein Institute, the success of the FBP came from Hasler being a more popular candidate than Frick, and that the party's polices were more likely to align with voter expectations; respondents also generally preferred the formation of a coalition government as opposed to the continuation of a single-party government. Peter Wolff of the VU postulated that the defeat of the party came from neglecting grassroots elements and the concerns of regular citizens, describing it as a "wake-up call".

== See also ==
- Elections in Liechtenstein
- List of Liechtenstein general elections

== Bibliography ==
- Nohlen, Dieter; Stöver, Philip (2010). Elections in Europe: A data handbook. Nomos. ISBN 978-3-8329-5609-7.
- Marxer, Wilfried (2000). Wahlverhalten und Wahlmotive im Fürstentum Liechtenstein [Voting Behavior and Voting Motives in the Principality of Liechtenstein] (PDF) (in German). Vaduz: Verlag der Liechtensteinischen Akademischen Gesellschaft. ISBN 3-7211-1044-7.
