= 1997 Liechtenstein general election =

- 2 February 1997
- All 25 seats in the Landtag; 13 seats needed for a majority
- Turnout: 86.77% (▲1.46pp)
Party	Leader	Vote %	Seats	+/–
VU	Mario Frick	49.23	13	0
FBP	Thomas Büchel	39.20	10	−1
FL	Executive committee	11.57	2	+1
This lists parties that won seats. See the complete results below.
Results by constituency
Prime Minister before	Prime Minister after
Mario Frick; VU	Mario Frick; VU

General elections were held in Liechtenstein on 2 February 1997 to elect the 25 members of the Landtag. The Patriotic Union (VU) won a majority of thirteen seats, with the Progressive Citizens' Party (FBP) winning ten. The Free List (FL) won two seats. Voter turnout was 86.8%.

Incumbent prime minister, Mario Frick of the VU, sought re-election for a second term, while the FBP nominated deputy prime minister, Thomas Büchel, for the position. Following the elections, the FBP ended the coalition government that had existed since 1938 and moved into the opposition; the VU subsequently formed a single-party majority government under the leadership of Frick. The new government was sworn in on 14 April 1997.

== Background ==
In the October 1993 elections the Patriotic Union (VU) gained a majority of thirteen seats, whereas the Progressive Citizens' Party (FBP) won eleven seats, and the Free List won one seat. As a result, the VU and FBP formed a coalition government, with Mario Frick becoming prime minister. The elections had been called early by Hans-Adam II, Prince of Liechtenstein due to a motion of no confidence being passed against prime minister Markus Büchel at the request of the FBP. The decision to hold fresh elections was notably criticized by members of the Free List and VU.

Frick's term in office was marked by Liechtenstein joining the European Economic Area (EEA) following a successful referendum in 1995, and also the World Trade Organization the same year. His government also signed a value-added tax treaty with Switzerland in 1994.

== Electoral system ==
The 25 members of the Landtag are elected via open list proportional representation from two constituencies, Oberland with 15 seats and Unterland with 10 seats. Voters voted for a party list and then may have struck through candidates for whom they did not wish to cast a preferential vote, and may also have added names of candidates from other lists. The electoral threshold to win a seat was 8%. Landtag members sit for a four-year term. Once formed, the Landtag elected the prime minister and two government councillors who were then appointed by the reigning prince to govern in a cabinet. Voting was compulsory by law, and those who failed to vote without a valid reason may be fined, but it was not enforced. Citizens over 20 years of age who had been resident in the country for at least one month prior to election day were eligible to vote. It was the first election in Liechtenstein that allowed for postal voting, although limited to voters who were ill, disabled, or temporarily out of the country.

== Campaign ==
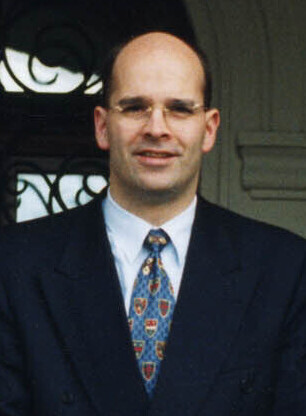
Mario Frick (left) and Thomas Büchel (right) were the VU and FBP's respective nominations for prime minister

The VU re-nominated Frick for prime minister on 9 September 1996. Additionally, the party nominated incumbent government councillors Andrea Willi and Michael Ritter as government candidates. The party's program included improvement's to public transport, educational reform, equal rights for men and women, and a balanced budget. Party president Oswald Kranz criticized "some other parties" to having contributed to an increasingly negative political climate in Liechtenstein through persistent criticism.

The FBP nominated incumbent deputy prime minister, Thomas Büchel, for prime minister on 4 December 1996. In addition, the party nominated Cornelia Gassner and Marie-Louise Eberle as government candidates. Party president Norbert Seeger remarked how the party had corrected its mistakes from 1993, and also criticized the VU for having an "arrogance of power".

Both the VU and FBP aimed for an absolute majority in the election, but both parties also indicated that they were open to continuing the coalition government between the two parties. In a debate on 26 January 1997, Frick emphasized the party's plans for economic policy, whereas Büchel criticized the VU's economic policies and challenged the party's slogan of "The future is secure" by arguing that "the future cannot simply happen". Near the end of the election campaign, the FBP encouraged voters to give the VU a "red card", which subsequently faced backlash from the VU, and was considered to have been met by confusion, even from within the FBP.

The Free List presented its Landtag candidates on 2 December 1996. The party sought to win three seats in the Landtag while ruling out electoral alliances with other parties or participation in government. The party campaigned on issues such as environmental protection.

== Candidates ==
Candidates had the same eligibility criteria as voters. Political parties required the support of 30 voters from a constituency to be eligible to nominate a candidate list in it. A total of 67 candidates contested the election; 47 men and 20 women.

Oberland	FBP	VU	FL
Oberland	Hedi Beck; Christian Brunhart; Arthur Büchel; David Falk; Gebhard Hoch; Elmar Kindle; Helmut Konrad; Elisabeth Marxer-Ospelt; Marco Ospelt; Werner Ospelt; Pio Schurti; Peter Sele; Karlheinz Vogt; Klaus Wanger	Harald Bühler; Norbert Bürzle; Erina Frick; Fridolin Frick; Magdalena Frommelt; Walter Hartmann; Lorenz Heeb; Dorothée Laternser; Karlheinz Ospelt; Volker Rheinberger; Hubert Sele; Peter Sprenger; Walter Vogt; Ronny Walser; Peter Wolff	Evelyne Bermann; Jutta Büchel; Kaspar Frick; René Hasler; Claudia Heeb-Fleck; Christel Hilti-Kaufmann; Hans Frommelt; Helen Marxer-Bulloni; Nikolaus Ruther; Paul Vogt; Markus Wille
Unterland	FBP	VU	FL
Unterland	Otmar Hasler; Arno Kind; Rudolf Lampert; Gabriel Marxer; Johannes Matt; Felix Näscher; Gaudenz Öhri; Roswitha Schafhauser; Herlinde Tiefenthaler-Mündle; Renate Wohlwend	Otto Büchel; Hansjörg Goop; Ingrid Hassler-Gerner; Oswald Kranz; Isolde Lanter; Viktor Meier; Manfred Nipp; Donath Oehri; Ossi Oehri; Susanne Schneider	Ingrid Allaart-Batliner; Linda Mündle-Büchel; Egon Matt; Adolf Ritter; Dominik Sele; Rosemarie Schädler-Matt
Source: Liechtensteiner Volksblatt

== Results ==
The VU received 49.2% of the vote, a 0.9% decrease from their October 1993 performance, and won a majority of thirteen seats in the Landtag. The FBP received 39.2% of the vote, a 2.1% decrease from 1997 and won ten seats at a decrease of one. It was the lowest electoral result in the FBP's history to that point. The Free List saw its vote share increase from 8.5% to 11.6% from October 1993 and won two seats, at an increase of one.

A total of 12,811 ballots were cast, resulting in a 86.8% voter turnout.

Party	Votes	%	Seats	+/–
Patriotic Union	82,786	49.23	13	0
Progressive Citizens' Party	65,914	39.20	10	–1
Free List	19,455	11.57	2	+1
Total	168,155	100.00	25	0
Valid votes	12,634	98.62		
Invalid/blank votes	177	1.38		
Total votes	12,811	100.00		
Registered voters/turnout	14,765	86.77		
Source: Inter-Parliamentary Union

=== By electoral district ===
Electoral district	Seats	Party	Elected members	Substitutes	Votes	%	Swing	Seats	+/–
Oberland	15	Patriotic Union	Peter Wolff; Karlheinz Ospelt; Peter Sprenger; Hubert Sele; Walter Hartmann; Norbert Bürzle; Volker Rheinberger; Lorenz Heeb	Walter Vogt; Dorothée Laternser	63,860	50.9	▼0.19	8	0
Oberland	15	Progressive Citizens' Party	Alois Beck; Gebhard Hoch; Klaus Wanger; Marco Ospelt; Elmar Kindle; Helmut Konrad	Christian Brunhart; Arthur Büchel	47,143	37.5	▼2.34	6	0
Oberland	15	Free List	Paul Vogt	Christel Hilti-Kaufmann	14,382	11.4	▲2.39	1	0
Unterland	10	Patriotic Union	Ingrid Hassler-Gerner; Oswald Kranz; Otto Büchel; Donath Oehri; Hansjörg Goop	Viktor Meier	18,895	44.2	▼2.98	5	0
Unterland	10	Progressive Citizens' Party	Otmar Hasler; Johannes Matt; Gabriel Marxer; Rudolf Lampert	Renate Wohlwend	18,748	43.9	▼1.98	4	▼1
Unterland	10	Free List	Egon Matt	Adolf Ritter	5,067	11.9	▲4.95	1	▲1
Source: Liechtensteiner Volksblatt

== Aftermath ==
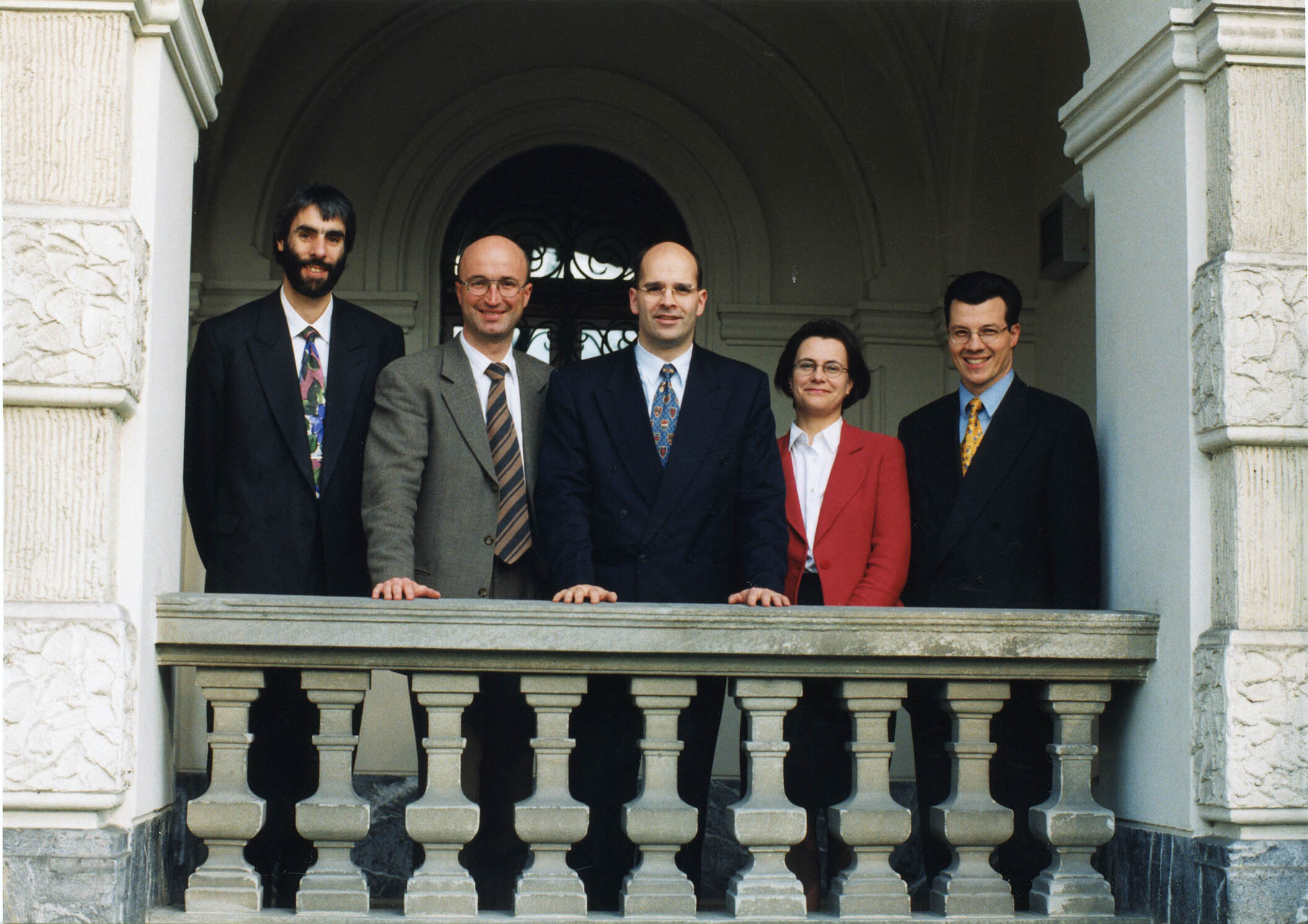
The government of Mario Frick

Following the election, the VU invited the FBP to begin negotiations the formation of a coalition government. However, on 10 March the FBP party delegates voted 31 in favour and 368 against continuing the coalition with the VU, and as a result the FBP subsequently moved into the opposition, ending the coalition government formed by the two parties that had existed since 1938. The party cited its desire to go into the opposition as a means to renew the party's political identity. As a result, the VU nominated Heinz Frommelt and Norbert Marxer as additional government candidates, and the party formed a single-party majority government under the leadership of Frick with Ritter as deputy prime minister. The new government was sworn in on 14 April 1997. Peter Wolff of the VU was elected as President of the Landtag upon the first session of the newly elected Landtag on 13 March 1997, with Otmar Hasler of the FBP as vice president.

A poll published by Wilfried Marxer suggested that 44% of respondents who voted for the VU did so because of the party's government candidates, followed by traditional party affiliation at 25%. On the other hand, 46% of respondents who voted for the FBP cited traditional party affiliation as the reason for their vote, followed by the party's Landtag candidates at 30%. Voters for the Free List cited the party's policies at 55%, followed by the party's Landtag candidates at 27%. A Demoscope poll initiated and published by the newspaper Liechtensteiner Vaterland suggested that a majority of respondents considered the FBP's red card campaign a "mistake" and that it had lost the party votes.

== See also ==
- Elections in Liechtenstein
- List of Liechtenstein general elections

== Bibliography ==
- Nohlen, Dieter; Stöver, Philip (2010). Elections in Europe: A data handbook. Nomos. ISBN 978-3-8329-5609-7.
- Marxer, Wilfried (2000). Wahlverhalten und Wahlmotive im Fürstentum Liechtenstein (PDF) (in German). Vaduz: Verlag der Liechtensteinischen Akademischen Gesellschaft. ISBN 3-7211-1044-7.
