= GWP =

GWP may refer to:

== Places ==
- Galbreath Wildlands Preserve, California, U.S.
- Gas Works Park, Seattle, Washington, U.S.

== Science and technology ==
- Gigawatt-peak (GW_{p})
- Global warming potential

== Other uses ==
- Gallup World Poll, a global survey
- Gentle Wind Project, a new age movement
- German Wirehaired Pointer, a breed of dog
- Global Water Partnership, an intergovernmental organisation
- Gross world product, in economics

== See also ==
- Goop (disambiguation)
