= Markus Büchel (disambiguation) =

Markus Büchel may refer to:

- Markus Büchel (bishop) (born 1949), Swiss bishop
- Markus Büchel (politician, born 1953), Liechtenstein politician
- Markus Büchel (1959–2013), Prime Minister of Liechtenstein
  - Markus Büchel cabinet, governing body of Liechtenstein
- Markus Büchel (athlete) (born 1961), Liechtenstein athlete

== See also ==
- Büchel
