= Büchel =

Büchel or Buechel is both a surname of Liechtenstein origin and place name and may refer to:

== People ==
- Alfons Büchel (1910–1990), Liechtenstein politician
- Alois Büchel (born 1941), Liechtenstein athlete and theater director
- Armin Büchel (born 1945), Liechtenstein judoka
- Benjamin Büchel (born 1989), Liechtenstein footballer
- Charles Buchel (1872–1950), British artist
- Christoph Büchel (born 1966), Swiss artist
- Emanuel Büchel (1705–1775), Swiss painter
- Ernst Büchel (1922–2003), Liechtenstein politician
- Eugen Büchel (1916–1978), Liechtenstein bobsledder
- Eugen Büchel (footballer), Swiss footballer
- Eugene Buechel (1874–1954), American Jesuit
- Gebhard Büchel (1921–2011), Liechtenstein decathlete
- Hubert Büchel (diplomat) (born 1951), Liechtenstein diplomat
- Hubert Büchel (politician) (born 1973), Liechtenstein politician
- Jakob Büchel (born 1955), Liechtenstein politician
- Johann Büchel (1869–1930), Liechtenstein politician
- Magnus Büchel (born 1960), Liechtenstein judoka
- Marcel Büchel (born 1991), Austrian footballer
- Marco Büchel (born 1971), Liechtenstein alpine skier
- Markus Büchel (bishop) (born 1949), Swiss Roman Catholic bishop
- Markus Büchel (politician, born 1953), Liechtenstein politician
- Markus Büchel (1959–2013), Prime Minister of Liechtenstein
- Markus Büchel (athlete) (born 1961), Liechtenstein sprinter
- Martin Büchel (born 1987), Liechtenstein footballer
- Otto Büchel (1949–2005), Liechtenstein politician
- Paul Büchel (born 1953), Liechtenstein judoka
- Robert Büchel (born 1968), Liechtenstein alpine skier
- Roland Rino Büchel (born 1965), Swiss businessman and politician
- Ronny Büchel (born 1982), Liechtenstein footballer
- Selina Büchel (born 1991), Swiss middle-distance runner
- Stefan Büchel (born 1986), Liechtenstein footballer
- Thomas Büchel (born 1952), Deputy Prime Minister of Liechtenstein
- Wilhelm Büchel (1873–1951), Liechtenstein politician and farmer

== Places ==
- Büchel, Rhineland-Palatinate, a municipality in the Cochem-Zell district of Rhineland-Palatinate, Germany
  - Büchel Air Base
- Büchel, Thuringia, in the Sömmerda district of Thuringia, Germany
- Buechel Formation, a geologic formation in Germany
- Buechel, Louisville, a neighborhood within the city limits of Louisville, Kentucky, United States
- West Buechel, Kentucky, a city neighboring Louisville

== See also ==
- Buechele
