= Egon Matt =

Egon Matt may refer to:

- Egon Matt (skier) (1925–2004), Liechtenstein skier who competed at the 1948 Winter Olympics
- Egon Matt (politician) (born 1952), Liechtenstein politician

== See also ==
- Matt (name)
