= Josy Biedermann =

Liechtenstein businesswoman and politician (born 1941)

Member of the Landtag of Liechtenstein for Oberland
- In office 13 March 2005 – 8 February 2009

Personal details
- Born: Josephine Schöb; 23 December 1941 (age 84) Zurich, Switzerland
- Party: Progressive Citizens' Party
- Spouse: Josef Biedermann (m. 1967)
- Children: 3

Josephine "Josy" Biedermann (née Schöb; born 23 December 1941) is a medical assistant, businesswoman, and politician from Liechtenstein who served in the Landtag of Liechtenstein from 2005 to 2009. She founded the textile company Textrina in 1989, which she managed for 15 years.

== Life ==
Josy was born as Josephine Schöb on 23 December 1941 in Zurich as the daughter of Werner Schöb and Josy (née Rechsteiner) as one of nine children. She attended secondary school in Gams and then an apprenticeship before working as a medical assistant from 1963, at first in Buchs from 1963 to 1970, and then in the Special Education Centre (HPZ) in Schaan from 1970 to 2005. In 1989, she founded the textile company Textrina, which was integrated into the workshop of the HPZ as a means of granting employment to people in the centre.

Biedermann was a member of the Planken municipal council from 1995 to 2003 as a member of the Progressive Citizens' Party (FBP), and was also the deputy mayor of the municipality from 1999 to 2003. She was a member of the Landtag of Liechtenstein from 2005 to 2009; during this time, she was a member of the Liechtenstein delegation to the OSCE Parliamentary Assembly. In the Landtag, she advocated for tax relief for volunteers. She did not seek re-election in the 2009 elections.

As of 2011, she has been a board member of the Liechtenstein Association for Refugee Aid since 1993, and also a member of the board of trustees of the Liechtenstein Development Service from 1997 to 2005. She was a member of the board of the Association for Assisted Living, and as of 2022 is the vice president of the Liechtenstein Senior Citizens' Association.

Originally a Swiss citizen, she became a citizen of Liechtenstein via her marriage to Josef Biedermann, who also served in the Landtag, on 6 April 1967; they have three children. She was a citizen of Schellenberg from 1967, and since 1997 of Panken.
