= 2008 Liechtenstein tax affair =

Series of tax investigations in numerous countries

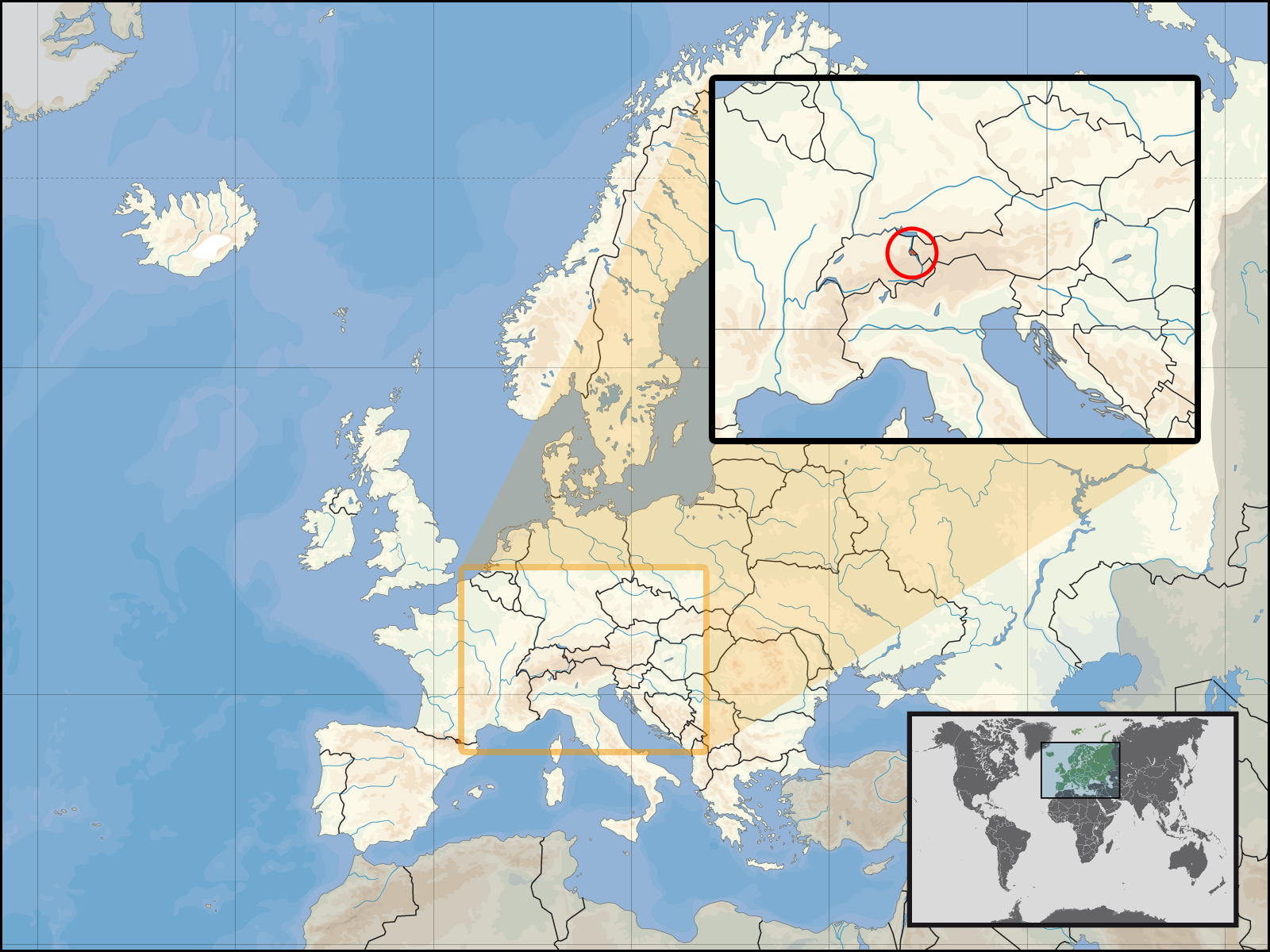
Location of Liechtenstein

The 2008 Liechtenstein tax affair was a series of tax investigations in numerous countries whose governments suspected that some of their citizens may have evaded tax obligations by using banks and trusts in Liechtenstein; the affair broke open with the biggest complex of investigations ever initiated for tax evasion in Germany. It was also seen as an attempt to put pressure on Liechtenstein, one of the few remaining uncooperative tax havens at the time, as identified by the Financial Action Task Force (FATF) on money laundering of the Paris-based Organisation for Economic Co-operation and Development, along with Andorra and Monaco, in 2007.

The affair prompted Liechtenstein to conduct extensive reforms to its banking and financial trust services. In 2010, the Liechtenstein government agreed to pay a 50 million euro fine to German treasury, and has since signed tax cooperation agreements with various countries.

== Background ==
Millions of euros belonging to hundreds of citizens living in Germany were channelled into the LGT Bank and other banks in Liechtenstein, taking advantage of Liechtenstein-based trusts to evade paying taxes in Germany. According to the prosecutor's office these trusts "have been created apparently only to evade paying taxes." According to the law in Liechtenstein, such trusts allow the separation of monetary assets from their owners and are kept anonymously. In contrast to trusts of most other countries, Liechtenstein trusts can be revoked at any time and the assets will be returned to the owner. Furthermore, such trusts as well as their maintaining shell entities are only charged 0.1% (minimum 1,000 Swiss francs) annually. Liechtenstein thus is known to be a tax haven.

== Investigations ==
=== Germany ===
According to the lead prosecuting office responsible for economic crime in Bochum, which is supported by prosecuting offices in other towns as well as the criminal police, currently about 600 to 700 individuals are suspected in the investigations. In addition, search warrants have been issued. An official confirmation about the total number of suspects and amount of money involved has not yet been issued. According to the prosecutors, current investigations provide a "very high level of evidence."

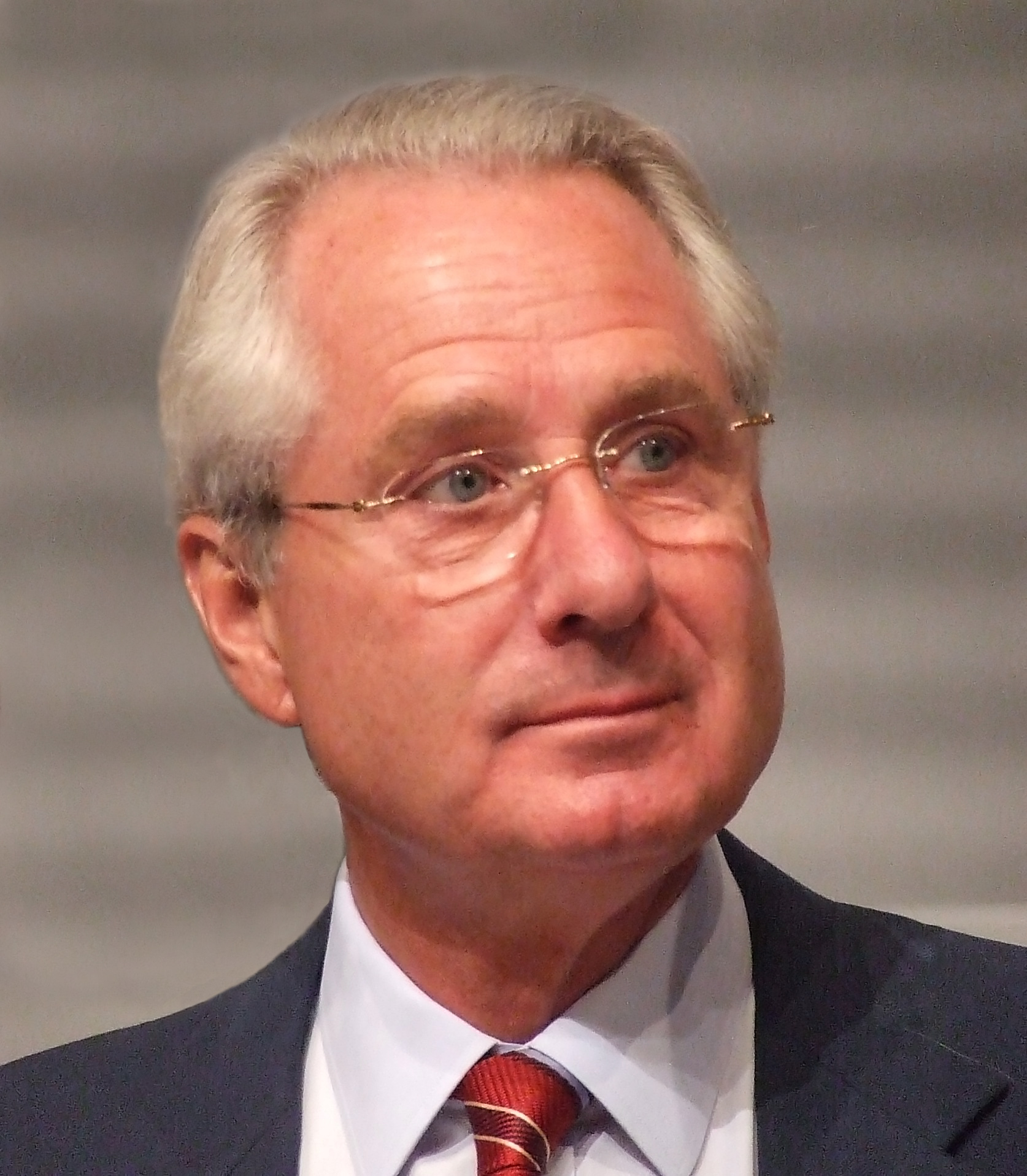
Klaus Zumwinkel was raided by police on 14 February 2008 on suspicion of using Liechtenstein banks to evade taxes.

The affair became known on February 14, 2008, when a raid was conducted against Klaus Zumwinkel, the chief executive of Deutsche Post AG, under the suspicion that he evaded about €1 million (US$1.46 million) in taxes. Pressured by the government, Zumwinkel resigned from his position. Similarly a number of other individuals have been under investigation for months, and the appearance that the well-to-do have ways and means to evade the German tax laws has caused complaints about inequality.

According to a report by the Süddeutsche Zeitung, Heinrich Kieber, a bank computer technician, sold a CD with incriminating bank information to the Bundesnachrichtendienst (BND, English: Federal Intelligence Service), which handed the material over to the tax investigation office in Wuppertal. Kieber was paid €4.2 million by the Federal Ministry of Finance for the data on which the investigation is based. Facing death threats, the informant was in hiding in 2008 and had asked for police protection. At the time, Kieber was wanted by Interpol. Kieber would later state that the secret services of several countries, including Germany, had provided him with a new identity and was protecting him.

A number of raids were conducted in Hamburg, Munich, Frankfurt and other cities. Several banks were searched including Bankhaus Metzler, the Hauck & Aufhäuser bank, Dresdner Bank, UBS in Munich and the Berenberg Bank in Hamburg. In the meantime revenue offices also noted a higher number of voluntary self-incriminations - this will avoid or reduce punitive damages - for possible tax evasions by people with financial assets in Liechtenstein.

While the BND received the data in 2006, the LGT Group indicated that in 2002 secret information had been stolen but the informant had been caught and tried in 2003, and all material had been returned.

=== United States ===
The informant also had sold data to the government of the United States. After the affair broke open, Senator Carl Levin, chairman of a senate investigations committee, indicated his intention to probe to what degree American citizens had used the LGT bank to evade taxes. In July 2008 the U.S. Subcommittee determined that the offshore tax haven deprived $100 billion per year from the U.S. taxpayer (equivalent to $1.50×10^{11} in 2025). Specifically mentioned were Switzerland's UBS AG and Liechtenstein's LGT Group. The report indicates that the LGT Group contributed to a "culture of secrecy and deception". According to the report UBS holds 1,000 declared accounts versus 19,000 that are not declared to the IRS. The report recommended a number of steps including tighter regulations for financial institutions.

=== Finland ===
According to the LGT Bank some 20 Finns had evaded tax in Finland via accounts containing €50-60 million in deposited funds. This was the largest known tax avoidance case in Finland. Most names are secret. According to Helsingin Sanomat in Sept/Oct 2013 Lichtenstein tax havens accounts include funds of Casimir Ehrnrooth (see UPM, YIT, Jaakko Pöyry and Guggenheim Helsinki Plan) Bertel Paulig (coffee, spices) and a construction company owners in Turku.

Seventeen Finns paid additional taxes totalling €10 million. The taxpayers initiated actions in the Administrative Court. The decisions are not public. According to Finnish law the cost of hidden taxes can be up to 30%. In two cases shown for the reporters the Administrative Court acted c. 1% interest rate payment. In one case hidden funds were in total €483,000 and acted additional tax was €4,350. In addition to this, tax payers must pay the avoided taxes and an interest of the tax funds not paid in time. According to the Supreme Administrative Court of Finland no other legal procedures are possible, than collecting the hidden tax and its 1% interest rate.

=== Other countries ===
On February 24, 2008, it became apparent that secret bank information had also been sold to the British tax authorities and that about 100 individuals in the UK are at risk for investigations for tax evasion. The informant also provided the governments of Australia, Canada and France with data. On February 26 it became known that the German government was willing to share relevant data of the about 4,500 accounts with other governments; two-thirds of these accounts belong to accounts of non-German individuals or entities. Fiscal authorities in Ireland, Denmark, Belgium, Finland, Greece, Italy, the Netherlands, Norway and Sweden indicated interest. The governments of the Czech Republic and Spain have also announced investigations derived from Germany's list. India, however, has thus far not considered Germany's offer despite reports that many wealthy Indian citizens might have accounts in the bank.

In February 2008, The Wall Street Journal reported that the informant likely was living in Australia. In 2011, Time confirmed that he had been living in the country until 2010-2011, being under the protection of the secret services of several countries. After being found by journalists in Australia, he moved to a new unknown location.

== Aftermath ==
=== Early reactions ===
Liechtenstein was directly affected by the affair as the LGT Bank is owned by the reigning House of Liechtenstein. The affair overshadowed the previously planned visit of Otmar Hasler, the Prime Minister of Liechtenstein, to Berlin on February 19, 2008, to meet with the Minister of Finance, Peer Steinbrück, and the Chancellor, Angela Merkel. Merkel asked for help in the investigation and cooperation in prevention of tax evasion, pointing out that Liechtenstein provided the US Internal Revenue Service with some data but not the German Ministry of Finances.

The newspaper Die Welt described the event as a "government crisis". Alois, Hereditary Prince of Liechtenstein, called the investigations an "attack" on Liechtenstein by Germany and considered legal remedies. The German government was criticized for working with secret bank data that was stolen by the informant. The head prosecutor of Liechtenstein Robert Wallner initiated an indictment "against unknown perpetrators for the violation of company secrets for a foreign country". Also, two lawyers in Berlin initiated lawsuits against the BND and the Federal government claiming among others "infidelity toward the taxpayer" and "spying of data".

The German government, on the other hand, considered a coordinated international action: according to internal sources of the Ministry of Finances it stated that Liechtenstein supposedly lives to "a good part from the business of evading taxes". The government may consider a number of possible actions: Liechtenstein is about to join the Schengen Agreement which would eliminate its border controls towards Austria, and Germany's consent is required; Germany could impose fees on transfers of currency, place taxes on business activities of its citizens in Liechtenstein, and require them to prove that their activities there are legitimate. Furthermore, it counts on the support of other governments who also feel the sting of tax evasion.

Questions were also raised within Germany as to the internal legality of the matter. Concerns were voiced that the actions taken by BND were outside the agency's national security (and constitutional) remit, with attention also focusing on the wider ethical debate as to whether BND was justified in paying a €4m bribe to a bank official in a foreign country (with financing and approval from both the German chancellery and finance ministry). In March 2009 Germany announced that it will not grant judicial assistance to Liechtenstein in the prosecution of the assumed perpetrator, claiming Ordre public overrides its duty to do so under the European Mutual Legal Assistance Agreement.

=== Tax treaties and financial reform ===
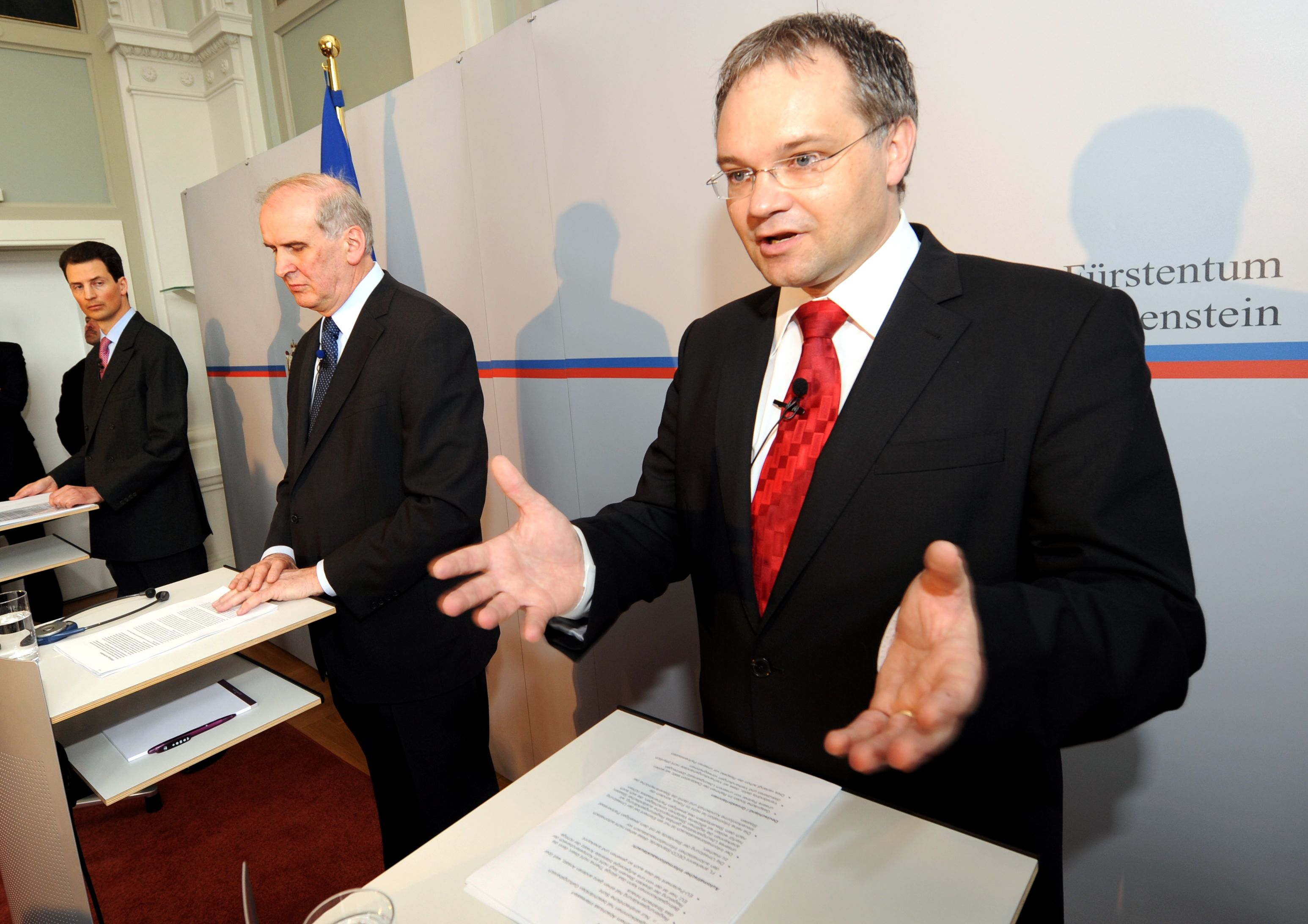
Alois, Hereditary Prince of Liechtenstein, Otmar Hasler, and Klaus Tschütscher present the "Liechtenstein declaration" on 12 March 2009.

On 12 March 2009, Otmar Hasler, Alois, Hereditary Prince of Liechtenstein, and then prime minister-elect Klaus Tschütscher presented the "Liechtenstein declaration", which pledged to commit the country to OECD's standards of transparency and information exchange regarding taxation. As such, extensive reforms were undertaken to its banking and financial trust services. In 2010, the Liechtenstein government agreed to pay a 50 million euro fine to German treasury, thus legally ending the affair. This policy was continued under the government of Adrian Hasler.

Liechtenstein entered negotiations with a number of countries to discuss tax avoidance issues. It reached an agreement with the United Kingdom in 2009 that will allow the about 5,000 British customers of Liechtenstein's banks that hold for them about £2-3 billion in secret accounts to come clear with British tax authorities under terms of a significantly reduced penalty. The agreement opened up Liechtenstein's banks to greater transparency, but remains controversial in Liechtenstein; some banks feared that clients would just move their money elsewhere. As of 2018, Liechtenstein has signed a total of 77 bilateral and multilateral agreements regarding taxation transparency with numerous countries.

The affair was credited in temporarily damaging the Liechtenstein economy, which had already been negatively effected by the 2008 financial crisis. The affair also saw the share prices of LGT group and the National Bank of Liechtenstein drop temporarily.

== See also ==
- Corruption in Liechtenstein
- 1999–2001 Liechtenstein financial crisis
