= Goop =

Goop may refer to:

== People ==
- Adolf Goop (1870–1964), Liechtenstein politician
- Alfons Goop (1910–1993), Liechtenstein Nazi leader
- Hansjörg Goop (born 1956), Liechtenstein engineer and politician
- Björn Goop (born 1976), Swedish trotting driver and trainer, son of Olle
- Olle Goop (1943–2022), Swedish trotting driver and trainer

== Other uses ==
- Goop, a Ben 10 character
- Goop (company), a lifestyle brand and online retailer by Gwyneth Paltrow
- Go-op, an English train operating company

== See also ==
- Goo (disambiguation)
- Slime (disambiguation)
- Goops, a 1900 book series by Gelett Burgess
- Plastigoop, a substance associated with Thingmaker toys
