= Buechele =

Buechele is a surname. Notable people with the surname include:

- Shane Buechele (born 1998), American football player
- Steve Buechele (born 1961), American baseball player

== See also ==
- Büchel (disambiguation)
