= Corruption in Liechtenstein =

Corruption in Liechtenstein has been described as relatively low compared to other nations. This has been achieved by the small European principality through a strong and stringent legal framework and effective implementation mechanisms.

== Anti-corruption mechanisms ==
The backbone of Liechtenstein's anti-corruption legal framework is its Penal Code. In particular, the code's Section 307 penalizes bribery (including foreign bribery) with up to ten years of imprisonment. Liechtenstein also has mechanisms to support the Penal Code, as part of its commitments to the international treaties it has ratified, such as the United Nations Convention against Corruption (UNCAC). In 2010, Liechtenstein also became a member of the Council of Europe’s Group of States against Corruption (GRECO), which is one of the Council of Europe's monitoring bodies in its goal to protect democracy and the rule of law. For its commitment to GRECO, Liechtenstein has appointed specialists for policymaking and to investigate various forms of corruption.

By 2020, Liechtenstein had implemented 17 out of the 20 GRECO recommendations according to the agency's evaluation. Thus the country is meeting its commitment to align its anti-corruption efforts with international standards. The country also revised the Law on the Payment of Contributions to Political Parties, improving on the statute to provide a clearer framework that enhances transparency of political party and campaign finance.

A code of conduct was also established for the judiciary, along with specific measures such as the refinement of the criteria for assessing a prosecutor's integrity. These measures led to a strengthened overall anti-corruption framework.

== Challenges ==
Despite the robust legal framework that leads to a low incidence of corruption, there are still challenges that could hamper anti-corruption efforts. According to a GRECO compliance report, for instance, Liechtenstein still has no code of conduct in place for members of its legislature. This has a bearing on transparency because members of the parliament are not – as of 2020 – required to declare their assets or conflicts of interest. GRECO has previously stated in the early stages of Liechtenstein's anti-corruption reform that mechanisms do not take into account broad forms of bribery such as those that are not material bribes, such as gratuities and favors.

Liechtenstein faces difficulties in implementing anti-money laundering measures. The Financial Market Authority (FMA) is charged with enforcing related regulations; but problems arise from the complexity of financial transactions and the sophisticated methods used to launder money. Furthermore, about 90% of the country's financial services are provided to non-residents. These difficulties have been demonstrated in several corruption scandals involving the financial sector.

== Corruption cases ==
Notable corruption scandals in Liechtenstein have mostly been in the private sector, particularly the country's banking industry. In 2008, several of the principality's banks and trusts were cited in the 2008 Liechtenstein tax affair, which involved several countries. Governments had investigated and prosecuted high-profile individuals and corporations that used Liechtenstein's financial institutions to hide assets and evade taxes. There were cases, for instance, of German citizens found to have stashed millions of euros in LGT Bank and other banks in Liechtenstein to evade taxes in Germany. There were also German financial institutions that established foundations in Liechtenstein. The companies advised their clients to put their money in these foundations to avoid paying taxes at home.

In 2013, a similar scandal broke which involved the Liechtensteinische Landesbank (LLB), the oldest bank in the country. It was accused and was proven to have helped foreign clients conceal their assets and avoid tax obligations. The bank settled to pay the United States, for instance, $23.8 million after it admitted to using secret accounts to help clients hide as much as $341 million from the United States IRS.

== See also ==
- 1999–2001 Liechtenstein financial crisis
- 2008 Liechtenstein tax affair
