= Franz Heeb =

Liechtenstein politician (born 1948)

Member of the Landtag of Liechtenstein for Unterland
- In office 13 March 2005 – 8 February 2009

Personal details
- Born: 18 June 1948 (age 78) Gamprin, Liechtenstein
- Party: Progressive Citizens' Party
- Spouse: Annelies Breuss (m. 1970)
- Children: 3

Franz Josef Heeb (born 18 June 1948) is a management consultant and politician from Liechtenstein who served in the Landtag of Liechtenstein from 2005 to 2009.

== Life ==
Heeb was born on 18 June 1948 in Gamprin as the son of farmer Josef Heeb and Ida (née Mark). He attended the Höhere Technische Lehranstalt in Bregenz before studying business administration in St. Gallen from 1970 to 1974; he received a doctorate in 1980. He worked as head of human resources at Hilti in Schaan and since 1990 has been an independent management consultant. He was a financial research associate at the Liechtenstein Institute from 1994 to 1998.

Heeb was a member of the Gamprin municipal council and deputy mayor of the municipality from 1995 to 1999 as a member of the Progressive Citizens' Party (FBP). He was a member of the Landtag of Liechtenstein from 2005 to 2009; during this time, he was head of the Liechtenstein delegation to the Parliamentary Committees of the EFTA and EEA. He did not seek re-election in the 2009 elections.

Heeb married Annelies Breuss on 31 July 1970 and they have three children together. He lives in Gamprin.
