= Eugen Büchel =

Liechtenstein bobsledder (1916–1978)

Eugen Büchel (8 August 1916 – 1978) was a Liechtensteiner bobsledder who competed in the mid-1930s. He finished 18th in the two-man event at the 1936 Winter Olympics in Garmisch-Partenkirchen.
