= Gentle Wind Project =

Non-Profit Group

Gentle Wind Project (GWP) was a new age group based in New England. Founded circa 1980 by John "Tubby" Miller and Claudia Panuthos (now Mary "Moe" Miller) in Arlington, Massachusetts, GWP members moved to Kittery, Maine in 1984. The organization was dissolved, as part of a consent decree following a fraud lawsuit brought against the group.

== Activities ==
GWP described itself as "a not-for profit world healing organization... [with] a healing technology... along with telepathic abilities... designed to restore and regenerate a person's energetic structure when used one time in a person's life." John Miller claimed to receive telepathic impressions from the spirit world. Miller claimed that he used these impressions to create "healing instruments". These instruments were made available to the public in exchange for set donation prices, ranging from hundreds to thousands of dollars.

== Legal issues ==
=== Litigation initiated by GWP ===
International anti-cult educator Ian Mander published a collection of information about GWP on the internet, as did two former followers, Judy Garvey and Jim Bergin, who wrote about their personal experiences with GWP during seventeen years as followers and board members. In response, in May 2004, GWP leaders filed a lawsuit in Maine U.S. District Court, consisting of federal racketeering (Racketeer Influenced and Corrupt Organizations Act) and Lanham claims, plus state claims, including defamation.

In January 2006, Garvey and Bergin won their Motion for Summary Judgment in January 2006, resulting in dismissal of GWP's federal claims on the merits, and dismissal of the remaining state claims without prejudice for lack of jurisdiction, by Senior District Judge Gene Carter.

In January 2006, after the dismissal of the federal litigation, GWP leaders refiled their lawsuit in Maine State Court (York County, Alfred, Maine). They brought the remaining state claims against Garvey, Bergin, and Mander.

=== Charges filed by Maine Attorney General against GWP ===
The Attorney General of Maine filed charges against GWP and its officers and directors, citing false claims and fraud. The complaint charged that the defendants falsely claimed that the instruments can improve mental, emotional, and physical well-being. The officers and directors were further charged for improperly disbursing hundreds of thousands of dollars to themselves.

The Attorney General asked the court to end sales of the "healing instruments", dissolve the corporation, ban the parties from serving as officers and directors of nonprofit corporations, order the return of all funds, and provide for restitution.

== GWP dissolved ==
On August 14, 2006, the case was resolved by a consent decree in which the defendants "agreed to pay civil penalties and costs and to an injunction that prohibits them from making certain health and research claims about the "healing instruments" or from serving as fiduciaries or advisors for any other Maine nonprofit. The parties have also agreed that GWP will be dissolved, and its remaining assets distributed by the Attorney General as restitution to consumers who purchased a "healing instrument" since 2003 and to a Maine charity whose charitable mission is to provide services to those with mental health disabilities, according to a press release from the Attorney General's office. Garvey and Bergin described the proceedings on their website.

== Family Systems Research Group ==
The Millers have formed the Family Systems Research Group to continue much of what the Gentle Wind Project had been doing. The new organization is apparently in New Hampshire and sells its products, rather than seeking "donations".
