= Alexander Marxer =

Liechtenstein politician (born 1964)

Member of the Landtag of Liechtenstein for Unterland
- In office 17 September 2003 – 13 March 2005

Personal details
- Born: 19 November 1964 (age 61) Thüringerberg, Austria
- Party: Patriotic Union
- Spouse: Naoko Murata (m. 1990)
- Children: 2

Alexander Marxer (born 19 November 1964) is a politician from Liechtenstein who served in the Landtag of Liechtenstein from 2003 to 2005.

== Life ==
Marxer was born on 19 November 1964 in Thüringerberg as the son of Guido Marxer and Bernarda (née Driessen) as one of two children. He attended secondary school in Eschen before conducting an apprenticeship as a laboratory technician at Oerlikon Balzers; from 1980 he studied electronics and measurement and control technology in Buchs, graduating with a diploma in 1984. He also studied an Master of Business Administration at the University of Gloucestershire. He works as an electrical engineer.

He was elected as a deputy member of the Landtag of Liechtenstein in 2001 as a member of the Patriotic Union (VU). Following the resignation of Otto Büchel on 17 September 2003 Marxer succeeded him as a full member of the Landtag on the same day; he was also briefly the Landtag's secretary. Again elected as a deputy member in the 2005 elections, Marxer resigned in March 2006 for professional reasons.

Marxer married Naoko Murata on 21 December 1990 and they have two children together. He lives in Mauren.
