= Egon Matt (politician) =

Liechtenstein politician (born 1952)

Member of the Landtag of Liechtenstein for Unterland
- In office 2 February 1997 – 11 February 2001

Personal details
- Born: 10 May 1952 (age 74) Mauren, Liechtenstein
- Party: Free List
- Spouse: Ursula Gantenbein (m. 1985)
- Children: 4

Egon Matt (born 23 April 1952) is a Liechtensteiner physician and politician who served in the Landtag of Liechtenstein from 1997 to 2001.

== Life ==
Matt was born on 23 April 1952 in Mauren as the son of Paul Matt and Gertrud (née Frommelt) as one of four children. He attended the Liechtensteinisches Gymnasium before receiving a doctorate in medicine in 1978; he worked in various hospitals, including in Sierra Leone, before opening his own medical practice in Mauren in 1988.

He was a member of the Landtag of Liechtenstein from 1997 to 2001 as a member of the Free List; he was also a member of the Landtag's audit committee. Matt was a co-president of the party from 2005 to 2009, alongside Claudia Heeb-Fleck. Following a disappointing result for the Free List in the 2009 elections, Matt and Heeb-Fleck resigned as president and they were succeeded by Wolfgang Marxer in June.

In the run-up to the 2003 Liechtenstein constitutional referendum, Matt alongside other former members of the Landtag, opposed the proposed changes by the prince.

Matt married Ursula Gantenbein on 10 May 1985 and they have four children together. He lives in Mauren.
