= Helmut Bühler =

Liechtenstein politician (born 1957)

Member of the Landtag of Liechtenstein for Unterland
- In office 1 February 2001 – 13 March 2005

Personal details
- Born: 2 July 1957 (age 69) Thusis, Switzerland
- Party: Progressive Citizens' Party
- Spouse(s): Bettina Mündle (m. 1988, divorced) Gabriele Wanger (m. 2003)
- Children: 2

Helmut Bühler (born 2 July 1957) is a politician from Liechtenstein who served in the Landtag of Liechtenstein from 2001 to 2005.

He works as the head construction manager in Gamprin. He is from Triesenberg and lives in Gamprin.
