= Peter Sprenger =

Liechtenstein lawyer and politician (1953–2018)

- Sprenger in 2000

Member of the Landtag of Liechtenstein for Oberland
- In office 2 February 1997 – 13 March 2005

Personal details
- Born: 29 December 1953 Baden, Switzerland
- Died: 23 October 2018 (aged 64) Fläsch, Switzerland
- Party: Patriotic Union
- Spouse: Silvia Risch (m. 1982)
- Relations: Daniel Risch (nephew)
- Children: 2

Peter Sprenger (29 December 1953 – 23 October 2018) was a lawyer, mountaineer, and politician from Liechtenstein who served in the Landtag of Liechtenstein from 1997 to 2005. A member of the Patriotic Union (VU), he was the party's spokesman in the Landtag from 1997 to 2003. He was a well-regarded lawyer and politician; he has been called the "greatest democrat since Wilhelm Beck".

== Life ==
Sprenger was born on 29 December 1953 in Baden as the son of deputy government councillor Josef Sprenger and Elisabeth Cortesi as one of three children. He attended secondary school at the Liechtensteinisches Gymnasium from 1967 to 1975 and then received a doctorate in law at the University of Zurich in 1985. From 1981 to 1991 he received legal training at the law firm of Ivo Beck; he passed the bar in 1989 and opened his own law firm in 1991.

He was an employee at the trust company Administral Anstalt in Vaduz from 1983 to 1991, and then chairman of the company's board of directors from 1991. Additionally, from 1992 to 1993 served as a member of the Administrative Appeals Authority and then was vice president of the Liechtenstein state court from 1995 to 1997.

He was elected to the Landtag of Liechtenstein in 1997 as a member of the Patriotic Union (VU); he was also a member of the Landtag's foreign policy and judge selection committees. In addition, he was the VU's spokesman in the Landtag from 1997 to 2003. Sprenger considered his main influence in politics to be that of Wilhelm Beck and was an advocate for greater political freedom in Liechtenstein.

Following the 2001 elections, in which the Progressive Citizens' Party (FBP) gained a majority of seats in the Landtag, Sprenger was a prominent advocate for the VU moving into the opposition instead of forming a coalition government, which the party ultimately did so.

During this time in the Landtag, Sprenger was a leading figure against the proposed changes to the Constitution of Liechtenstein proposed by Prince Hans-Adam II; he campaigned against them. In the 2003 Liechtenstein constitutional referendum, where it was proposed that the reigning Prince of Liechtenstein be given wider powers, the proposal was ultimately accepted by voters. This result has been accredited to Sprenger's decision to not seek re-election to the Landtag in the 2005 elections.

In 2003, Sprenger was a founding member and from then the manager of the RHW-Stiftung foundation. He was also a board member of the Democracy Movement in Liechtenstein.

== Personal life and death ==
Sprenger married Silvia Risch on 28 May 1982 and they had two children together. His nephew Daniel Risch served as Prime Minister of Liechtenstein from 2021 to 2025.

Sprenger successfully climbed six of the Seven Summits and in 2012 was the first Liechtensteiner to successfully reach the summit of Mount Everest. On 23 October 2018, Sprenger fell while climbing the Schwarzhorn in Fläsch and died the same day; he was 64 years old. Tributes were paid to Sprenger by VU party-president Günther Fritz and a one-minute silence was held in his honour by members of the VU during an event ahead of the 2019 local elections. He has been called the "greatest democrat since Wilhelm Beck".

Sprenger was the subject of a 2020 book, Sportliche Erlebnisse mit Peter Sprenger (Sporting experiences with Peter Sprenger), by Bernhard Frommelt, Peter Geiger, and twenty other contributors.
