= Pepo Frick =

Liechtensteiner politician (born 1952)

Member of the Landtag of Liechtenstein for Oberland
- In office 25 March 2005 – 27 March 2013

Personal details
- Born: 13 May 1952 (age 73) Schaan, Liechtenstein
- Party: Free List
- Spouse: Anita Feger (m. 1983)
- Children: 2
- Profession: Physician

Pepo Frick (born 13 May 1952) is a physician and politician from Liechtenstein who served in the Landtag of Liechtenstein from 2005 to 2013. He was the leader of the Free List, alongside Conny Büchel-Brühwiler, until 2022.

== Life ==
Frick was born on 13 May 1952 in Schaan as the son of farmer Sepp Frick and Hermine (née Ospelt) as one of seven children. He attended high school in Vaduz and then from 1972 he studied medicine in the University of Basel, where he graduated with a doctorate in 1979.

From 1984 to 1987 Frick worked as a physician in Lesotho and a member of the Liechtenstein crisis team which included assignments in Luxor, Egypt in 1998 and Thailand in 2004. Since 1990, he has worked as a family physician in Mauren.

From 1991 to 1999 he was a member of the Schaan local council as a member of the Free List. From 1999 to 2005 and again from 2013 to 2022 he was the co-leader of the Free List. He was a member of the Landtag of Liechtenstein from 2005 to 2013.

Frick married Anita Feger on 6 May 1983 and they have two children together.
