= Dorothée Laternser =

Liechtenstein paediatrician and politician (born 1951)

Member of the Landtag of Liechtenstein for Oberland
- In office 11 February 2001 – 13 March 2005

Personal details
- Born: 13 August 1951 (age 75) Illingen, Baden-Württemberg, West Germany
- Party: Patriotic Union
- Spouse: Arnold Laternser (m. 1982)
- Children: 2

Dorothée Laternser (born 15 August 1951) is a German-born paediatrician and politician from Liechtenstein who served in the Landtag of Liechtenstein from 2001 to 2005.

== Life ==
Originally from Illingen, she studied in Tübingen and Bonn and received a doctorate in medicine before conducting specialist training paediatrics and adolescent medicine from 1975 to 1982. In 1982 she moved to Liechtenstein and since 1983 has worked as a paediatrician in the country.

Laternser was a deputy member of the Landtag from 1997 to 2001 as a member of the Patriotic Union (VU), and then a full member from 2001 to 2005; during this time, she was a member of the Landtag's audit and state committees, and also a member of the Liechtenstein delegation to the Parliamentary Assembly of the Council of Europe. She is an advocate for the lowering of the gender pay gap.

She was a board member and the president of the Women's Union. She was a board member of the old-age and survivors insurance in Liechtenstein from 2008 to 2016.

Laternser married Arnold Laternser on 12 March 1982 and they have two children together. A resident of Vaduz, she lives in Triesen.
