= 1999 Liechtenstein local elections =

- 30 January 1999
- Turnout: 82.1%

Local elections were held in Liechtenstein on 30 January 1999 to elect the municipal councils and the mayors of the eleven municipalities.

== Election system ==
The municipal councils (German: Gemeinderat) are composed of an even number of councillors plus the mayor (German: Gemeindevorsteher). The number of councillors is determined by population count: 6 or 8 councillors for population 1,500, 8 or 10 councillors for population between 1,500 and 3,000, and 10 or 12 councillors for population over 3,000.

Councillors were elected in single multi-member districts, consisting of the municipality's territory, using an open list proportional representation system. Voting was on the basis of universal suffrage in a secret ballot. The mayors were elected in a two-round system. If none of the candidates achieved a majority in the first round, a second round would have been held four weeks later, where the candidate with a plurality would be elected as a mayor.

== Results ==
=== Summary ===
Party	Votes		Mayors		Seats	
Party	Votes	%	Total	+/–	Total	+/–
Progressive Citizens' Party	59,592	46.9	5	▲1	59	▲1
Patriotic Union	59,952	47.1	6	▼1	56	▼5
Free List	7,638	6.0	0	0	6	▲1
Total	126,419	100	11	–	121	–
Valid ballots	12,053	96.3				
Invalid/blank ballots	466	3.7				
Total	12,504	100				
Registered voters/turnout	15,520	82.1				
Source: Statistisches Jahrbuch 1999, p.356-367, Liechtensteiner Volksblatt

=== Mayoral elections ===
Municipality	Party	Candidate	Votes
Balzers	Patriotic Union	Othmar Vogt	910
Balzers	Progressive Citizens' Party	Urs Vogt	795
Eschen	Progressive Citizens' Party	Gregor Ott	841
Eschen	Patriotic Union	Manfred Frick	598
Gamprin	Patriotic Union	Donath Oehri	348
Mauren	Progressive Citizens' Party	Johannes Kaiser	1028
Planken	Progressive Citizens' Party	Gaston Jehle	92
Planken	Free List	Hardy Marxer-Beck	68
Ruggell	Patriotic Union	Jakob Büchel	384
Ruggell	Progressive Citizens' Party	Hubert Biedermann	374
Schaan	Progressive Citizens' Party	Hansjakob Falk	1249
Schaan	Free List	Walter Wachter	407
Schellenberg	Patriotic Union	Walter Kieber	262
Triesen	Progressive Citizens' Party	Xaver Hoch	1110
Triesenberg	Patriotic Union	Hubert Sele	912
Vaduz	Patriotic Union	Karlheinz Ospelt	1052
Vaduz	Progressive Citizens' Party	Alex Ospelt	631
Source: Liechtensteiner Volksblatt
