= Walter Vogt (politician) =

Liechtenstein carpenter and politician (born 1947)

Member of the Landtag of Liechtenstein for Oberland
- In office 11 February 2001 – 13 March 2005

Personal details
- Born: 28 November 1947 (age 78) Grabs, Switzerland
- Party: Patriotic Union
- Spouse: Olga Ritter (m. 1970)
- Relations: Andreas Vogt (grandfather)
- Children: 4

Walter Vogt (born 28 November 1947) is a Liechtensteiner carpenter and politician who served in the Landtag of Liechtenstein from 2001 to 2005.

He works as a carpenter and took over the carpentry business from his grandfather Andreas Vogt, which he expanded. In 1989, he founded the metalworking shop Vogt Fenstertechnik AG in Balzers. He was a deputy member of the Landtag from 1993 to 2001. He is a member of the Balzers referendum committee.
