= Helmut Konrad =

Liechtenstein politician (born 1954)

Member of the Landtag of Liechtenstein for Oberland
- In office 2 February 1997 – 13 March 2005

Personal details
- Born: 16 May 1954 (age 71) Vaduz, Liechtenstein
- Party: Progressive Citizens' Party
- Spouse: Liselotte Kindle (m. 1979)
- Children: 4

Helmut Konrad (born 16 May 1954) is a teacher and politician from Liechtenstein who served in the Landtag of Liechtenstein from 1997 to 2005. A member of the Progressive Citizens' Party (FBP), he served as the party's spokesman in the Landtag from 2000 to 2001.

== Life ==
Konrad was born on 16 May 1954 as the son of Karl Konrad and Hildegard (née Schwenninger) as one of two children. He attended the Liechtensteinisches Gymnasium in Vaduz before studying German and history in Bern from 1974 to 1980, graduating with a teaching certificate for secondary schools; he worked as a teacher in the secondary school in Vaduz from 1980 to 2002.

Konrad was a member of the Landtag of Liechtenstein from 1997 to 2005 as a member of the Progressive Citizens' Party (FBP); he was the party's spokesman in the Landtag from 2000 to 2001. He did not seek re-election in the 2005 elections.

He was a board member of the Historical Association for the Principality of Liechtenstein from 1990 to 2002. As of 2024, he has been president of the board of directors at the Stein Egerta education centre in Schaan since 2016. He is also president of the Liechtenstein matura commission.

Konrad married Liselotte Kindle on 3 March 1979 and they have four children together. He lives in Schaan.
