= Jürgen Zech =

Liechtenstein politician (born 1965)

Member of the Landtag of Liechtenstein for Unterland
- In office 1 February 2001 – 13 March 2005

Personal details
- Born: 20 November 1965 (age 59); Bludenz, Austria
- Political party: Progressive Citizens' Party
- Spouse: Cornelia Schmidberger (m. 1996)
- Children: 3

Jürgen Zech (born 20 November 1965) is a politician from Liechtenstein who served in the Landtag of Liechtenstein from 2001 to 2005.

He works as a self-employed trustee. During his time in the Landtag, he was the head of the Liechtenstein parliamentary delegation to the European Free Trade Association and European Economic Area. In 2021, he participated in a protest in front of the Government Building in Vaduz against COVID-19 measures in Liechtenstein.

He is from Mauren and lives in Eschen.
