= Hansjörg Goop =

Liechtenstein engineer and politician (born 1956)

Member of the Landtag of Liechtenstein for Unterland
- In office 2 February 1997 – 11 February 2001

Personal details
- Born: 21 December 1956 (age 69) Schellenberg, Liechtenstein
- Party: Patriotic Union
- Spouse: Judith Walser (m. 1979)
- Children: 2

Hansjörg Goop (born 21 December 1956) is an engineer and former politician from Liechtenstein who served in the Landtag of Liechtenstein from 1997 to 2001.

He received a diploma in mechanical engineering at the University of Liechtenstein in 1989 and since 1998 he has owned his own company Novartec AG, based in Hunzenschwil. He was a deputy member of the Landtag from 1993 to 1997 as a member of the Patriotic Union. As a member of the Landtag, he the head of the Liechtenstein delegation to the Parliamentary Assembly of the Council of Europe. He was vice president of the Patriotic Union from 1996 to 2001.

He was president of FC Ruggell from 1995 to 2004. He lives in Schellenberg.
