= Peter Lampert =

Liechtenstein politician (1951–2015)

- 2009 election portrait

Member of the Landtag of Liechtenstein for Oberland
- In office 11 February 2001 – 3 February 2013

Personal details
- Born: 23 September 1951 Vaduz, Liechtenstein
- Died: 4 July 2015 (aged 63) Chur, Switzerland
- Party: Progressive Citizens' Party
- Spouse: Elisabeth Doldinger (m. 1976)
- Children: 2

Peter Lampert (23 September 1951 – 4 July 2015) was a politician from Liechtenstein who served in the Landtag of Liechtenstein from 2001 to 2013.

He worked as a tiler with his own company for wall and floor coverings. He was the head of the Liechtenstein mountain rescue service from 1980 to 2000 and also of the Liechtenstein avalanche service from 1980 to 2011. He died of an illness on 4 July 2015, aged 63.

== Honours ==
- Liechtenstein: Commander's Cross with Star of the Order of Merit of the Principality of Liechtenstein (1999)
