= Hubert Sele =

Liechtenstein politician (born 1955)

Member of the Landtag of Liechtenstein for Oberland
- In office 24 October 1993 – 11 February 2001

Mayor of Triesenberg
- In office February 1999 – 1 May 2015
- Deputy: Erich Sprenger (1999–2003); Franz Beck (2003–2007); Erich Sprenger (2007–2015)
- Preceded by: Herbert Hilbe
- Succeeded by: Christoph Beck

Personal details
- Born: 11 July 1955 (age 70) Triesenberg, Liechtenstein
- Party: Patriotic Union
- Spouse: Viktoria Gassner (m. 1983)
- Children: 3

Hubert Sele (born 7 November 1955) is a politician from Liechtenstein who served in the Landtag of Liechtenstein from 1993 to 2001. He also served as the mayor of Triesenberg from 1999 to 2015.

He is the president of the genealogy research association in Liechtenstein.

== Honours ==
- Liechtenstein: Knight's Cross of the Order of Merit of the Principality of Liechtenstein (2015)
