= Klaus Wanger =

President of the Landtag of Liechtenstein from 2001 to 2009

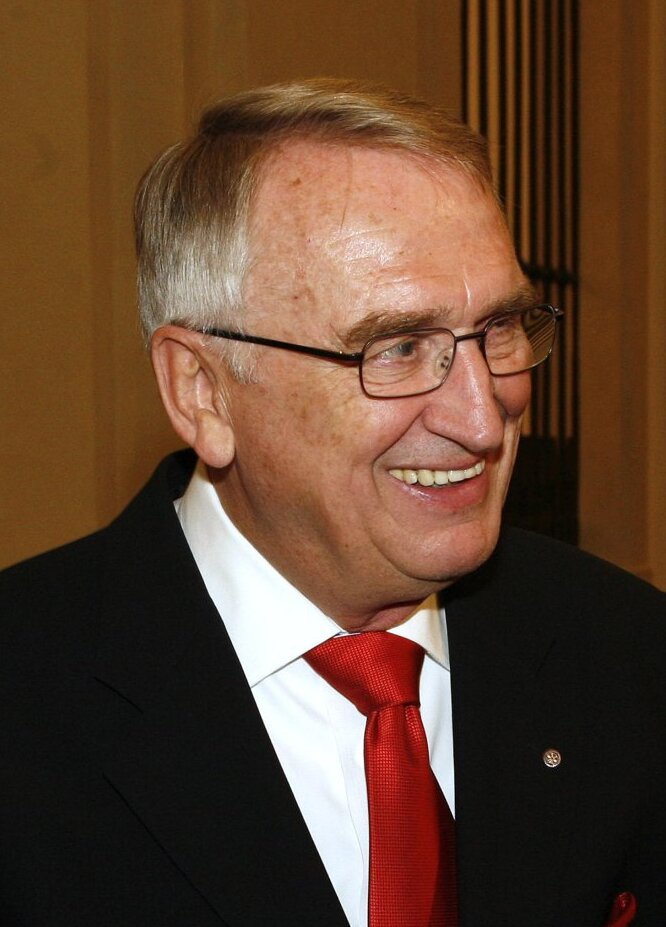
- Wanger in 2006

President of the Landtag of Liechtenstein
- In office 30 March 2001 – 25 March 2009
- Monarchs: Hans-Adam II; Alois (regent)
- Vice President: Peter Wolff; Ivo Klein
- Preceded by: Peter Wolff
- Succeeded by: Arthur Brunhart

Member of the Landtag of Liechtenstein for Oberland
- In office 24 October 1993 – 8 February 2009

Personal details
- Born: 24 February 1941 Schaan, Liechtenstein
- Died: 5 September 2026 (aged 85)
- Party: Progressive Citizens' Party
- Spouse: Adelheid Ritter (m. 1964)
- Children: 2

Klaus Wanger (24 February 1941 – 5 September 2026), also known as Nikolaus, was a Liechtensteiner businessman and politician who served as the President of the Landtag of Liechtenstein from 2001 to 2009. A member of the Progressive Citizens' Party (FBP), he served as a member of the Landtag of Liechtenstein from 1993 to 2009.

Wanger initially worked in business as the managing director of Hoval and vice chairman of the board of directors of the National Bank of Liechtenstein. As President of the Landtag, his time in office was characterized by being a prominent supporter of the prince's proposed changes in the 2003 constitutional referendum.

== Early life and business career ==
Klaus Wanger was born in Schaan on 24 February 1941, as the son of baker Reinold Wanger and Maria (née Kaufmann), and one of three children. Wanger attended secondary school and conducted an apprenticeship as a mechanical draftsman in the capital of Vaduz before attending evening high school in Zurich, earning a Matura in 1966. He graduated with a diploma in business administration in 1976.

He worked for Swiss companies and Hoval, being the managing director of Rheindata AG in Vaduz from 1975 to 1983 and then of Hoval from 1983 to 1993. From 1978 to 1988, he was the vice chairman of the board of directors of the National Bank of Liechtenstein.

== Political career ==
Wanger was a deputy member of the Landtag of Liechtenstein from 1978 to 1982 as a member of the Progressive Citizens' Party (FBP), then vice president of the party from 1982 to 1986. He was elected as a full member of the Landtag in the October 1993 elections. Following the FBP's victory in the 2001 elections, Wanger became president of the Landtag on 29 March. He was the oldest member of the Landtag upon his election.

Upon becoming president of the Landtag, Wanger played a key role in negotiating with Hans-Adam II, Prince of Liechtenstein regarding his proposed changes to the Constitution of Liechtenstein, intended to clear ambiguities highlighted in the 1992 constitutional crisis. In his Liechtenstein National Day speech in August 2001, Wanger declared that a compromise had been reached and that a proposal would be submitted to the Landtag. Wanger supported the proposal in the subsequent Landtag sessions, and was elected the chairman of the Landtag's constitutional commission in December, which continued to negotiate with the prince.

In the run-up to the subsequent 2003 constitutional referendum Wanger, alongside the rest of the FBP, supported the prince's proposed changes. During the campaign, he declared that "Without the monarchy and without the Prince, we are nothing." The referendum was accepted by voters. Wanger was re-elected as president of the Landtag following the 2005 elections by a narrow margin, retrospectively postulated by the newspaper Liechtensteiner Vaterland as being due to "polarizing" the Landtag during the constitutional debate. He did not seek re-election to the Landtag in the 2009 elections.

== Personal life and death ==
Wanger married Adelheid Ritter on 6 July 1964 and they had two children together. He died on 5 September 2026, at the age of 85.

== Honours ==
- Liechtenstein: Grand Cross with Diamonds of the Order of Merit of the Principality of Liechtenstein (2003)

== Bibliography ==
- Marcinkowski, Frank; Marxer, Wilfried (2010). Öffentlichkeit, öffentliche Meinung und direkte Demokratie. Eine Fallstudie zur Verfassungsreform in Liechtenstein [Public sphere, public opinion and direct democracy: A case study on constitutional reform in Liechtenstein]. Liechtenstein Politische Schriften (in German). Vol. 47. Schaan: Verlag der Liechtensteinischen Akademischen Gesellschft.
- Vogt, Paul (1987). 125 Jahre Landtag (in German). Vaduz: Landtag of the Principality of Liechtenstein.
