= Gebhard Hoch =

Liechtenstein politician (1943–2000)

Member of the Landtag of Liechtenstein for Oberland
- In office 24 October 1993 – 28 June 2000
- Succeeded by: Christian Brunhart

Personal details
- Born: 12 August 1943 Triesen, Liechtenstein
- Died: 28 June 2000 (aged 56) Bermuda, United Kingdom
- Party: Progressive Citizens' Party
- Spouse: Angelika Walser (m. 1974)
- Children: 1

Gebhard Hoch (12 August 1943 – 28 June 2000) was a politician from Liechtenstein who served in the Landtag of Liechtenstein from 1993 until his death in 2000.

He worked as a banker and trustee and was vice president of the board of directors at the National Bank of Liechtenstein from 1988 to 1996. He was a member of the Liechtenstein Olympic Committee and was a delegate at the 1988 and 1992 Winter Olympics. He was a member of the Triesen municipal council from 1987 to 1995 and then the Progressive Citizens' Party's spokesman in the Landtag from 1997 to 2000.

He died of heart failure on 28 June 2000, aged 56.
