= 1999–2001 Liechtenstein financial crisis =

Money laundering scandal in Liechtenstein

The 1999–2001 Liechtenstein financial crisis was instigated by the German Federal Intelligence Service in 1999 by accusing various banks, politicians and judges within Liechtenstein of cooperating with organized crime to promote money laundering. The crisis led to Liechtenstein being blacklisted by the Financial Action Task Force in 2000. The nation responded with a series of financial reforms, leading to the lifting of the blacklist the following year.

== Crisis ==
On 8 November 1999, German newspaper Der Spiegel published a report by the Federal Intelligence Service that accused various banks, politicians, and judges within Liechtenstein of cooperating with organized criminal organizations, such as the Russian mafia and drug cartels, to promote money laundering. The same day, Prime Minister of Liechtenstein Mario Frick held a press conference and criticized the report as "dubious and unfair". In June 2000, Liechtenstein was blacklisted by the Financial Action Task Force.

The Liechtenstein government commissioned Kurt Spitzer to investigate the allegations. He refuted them by arguing that the level of financial crime within Liechtenstein was on the same median as the rest of Europe, and that most of the money laundered within the country had previously been laundered elsewhere. Despite this, Spitzer's report highlighted organizational deficiencies, particularly in the provision of legal assistance.

As a result of the crisis, Liechtenstein reformed its financial sector. In 2000 a legal assistance law was passed and the criminal law and due diligence laws were revised. Previously, trustees and lawyers could open accounts in Liechtenstein banks with the holder remaining anonymous. In addition, the courts of Liechtenstein, the financial police and financial market supervision were expanded, many of whom specialized in combating organized crime. On 23 June 2001, the Financial Action Task Force removed Liechtenstein from the blacklist.

In 2000 Gabriel Marxer, a member of the Landtag of Liechtenstein, had his parliamentary immunity revoked and was subsequently arrested in connection to the scandal. However, he was acquitted in 2002.

== Aftermath ==
The crisis greatly damaged the Liechtenstein economy, and caused a stock market slump within the country. The number of companies based in Liechtenstein fell from 84,000 in 2000 to 80,000 in 2002, representing a loss of an estimated 16 billion CHF. Liechtenstein adopted the European Union's third iteration of the anti-money laundering directive (AMLD III) in 2005. However, the country again came under pressure in the 2008 Liechtenstein tax affair, which forced further reforms to the financial sector and the expansion of tax treaties with individual countries.

== See also ==
- Corruption in Liechtenstein
- 2008 Liechtenstein tax affair
