= Christian Brunhart (politician, born 1956) =

Liechtenstein politician (born 1956)

Member of the Landtag of Liechtenstein for Oberland
- In office 13 September 2000 – 11 February 2001
- Preceded by: Gebhard Hoch

Personal details
- Born: 10 January 1956 (age 70) Vaduz, Liechtenstein
- Party: Progressive Citizens' Party
- Spouse: Rosmarie Walse (m. 1985)
- Children: 1

Christian Brunhart (born 10 January 1956) is a politician from Liechtenstein who served in the Landtag of Liechtenstein from 2000 to 2001.

He completed a commercial apprenticeship as an electronics technician at Oerlikon Balzers in 1976 and worked at the company from 1980 to 1994. He was the head of the statistics department of the Liechtenstein government. He was a deputy member of the Landtag on three occasions; from February to October 1993, April 1994 to 2000, and finally from 2001 to 2005. He became a full member on 13 September 2000 when he succeeded Gebhard Hoch upon his death.

He married Rosmarie Walse on 31 May 1985 and they have one child together. He is from Balzers.
