= Ivo Klein =

Liechtenstein politician (born 1961)

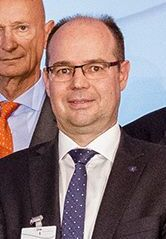
- Klein in 2017

Member of the Landtag of Liechtenstein for Unterland
- In office 11 February 2001 – 8 February 2009

Personal details
- Born: 30 April 1961 (age 64) Mauren, Liechtenstein
- Party: Patriotic Union
- Spouse: Luzia Oberer (m. 1990)
- Children: 2

Ivo Klein (born 30 April 1961) is an accountant and politician who served in the Landtag of Liechtenstein from 2001 to 2009.

He attended the Higher School of Economics and Administration in St. Gallen and works as a trustee and auditor. He has worked at LGT Group since 1985, and is a member of the board of directors. He was the Vice president of the Landtag of Liechtenstein from 2005 to 2009.
