= Marco Ospelt =

Liechtenstein politician (born 1948)

Member of the Landtag of Liechtenstein for Oberland
- In office 14 April 2004 – 13 March 2005
- Preceded by: Adrian Hasler
- In office 2 February 1997 – 11 February 2001

Personal details
- Born: 10 October 1948 (age 77) Vaduz, Liechtenstein
- Party: Progressive Citizens' Party
- Spouse: Ursula Josefa Bronold (m. 1981)
- Children: 1

Marco Ospelt (born 10 October 1948) is a physician and politician from Liechtenstein who served in the Landtag of Liechtenstein from 1997 to 2001 and again from 2004 to 2005.

He has a doctorate in medicine and practices traditional Chinese medicine in Vaduz. He was the Progressive Citizens' Party's spokesman in the Landtag from 2000 to 2001, and then a deputy member of the Landtag from 2001 to 2004. From 2004 to 2005, he was a full member again when he succeeded Adrian Hasler.
