= Liechtensteinisches Gymnasium =

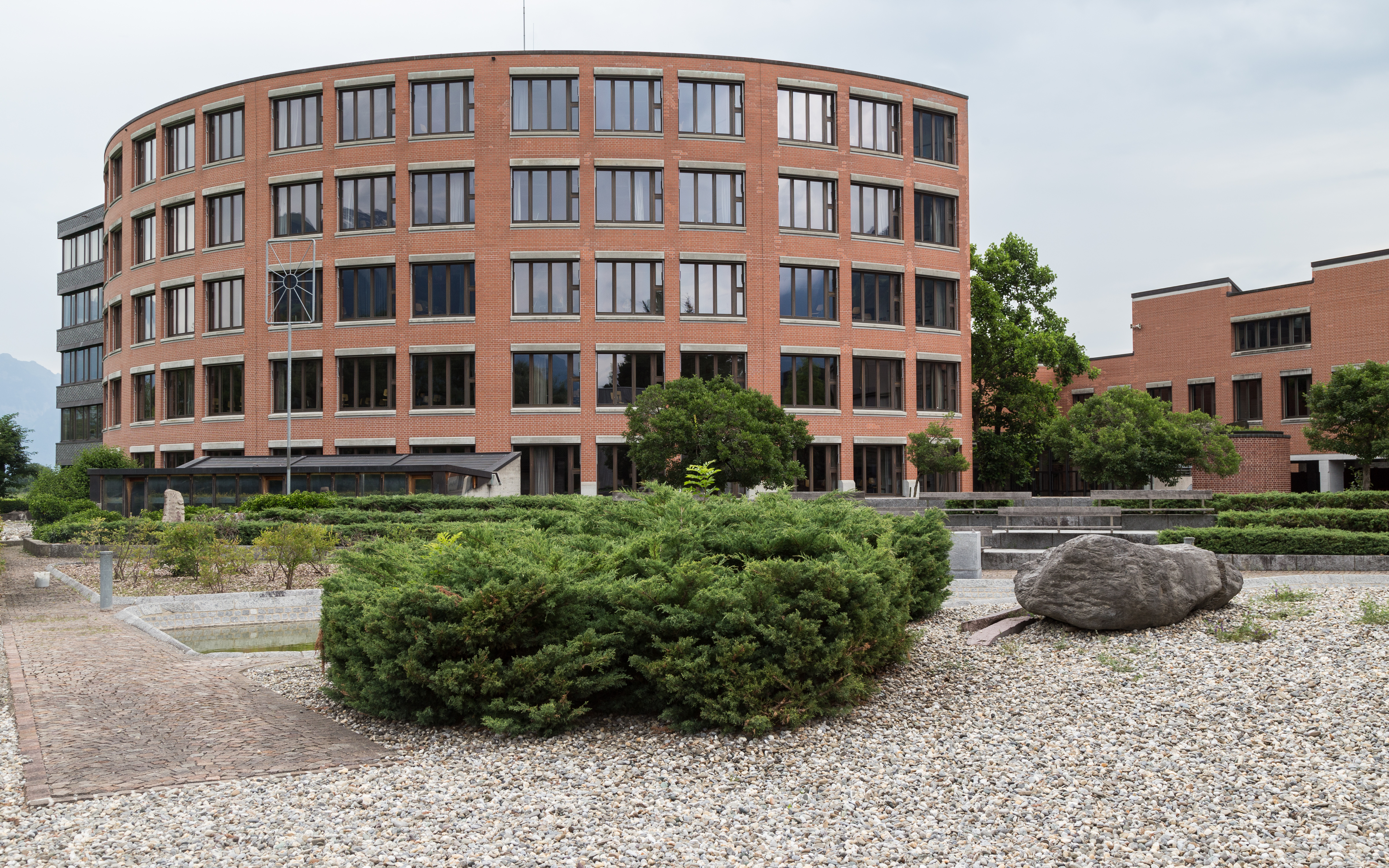

Location
- Marianumstrasse 45; 9490 Vaduz; Liechtenstein
- Coordinates: 47°9′22.5″N 9°30′19″E

Information
- School type: Public gymnasium
- Founded: 1937
- Gender: Coeducational
- Enrollment: more than 740
- Website: www.lg-vaduz.li

The Liechtensteinisches Gymnasium (English: Liechtenstein Gymnasium) is a secondary school located in Vaduz, Liechtenstein. It was founded in 1937 as the Collegium Marianum by the Maristen-Schulbrüder as an independent school. Since 1981, the Liechtensteinisches Gymnasium has been a public school run by the state of Liechtenstein.

The number of pupils has been increasing steadily since the mid-1980s, especially since girls were admitted in the mid-1960s; today, the school educates over 700 students.

== Unterstufe ==
The Unterstufe (or lower grades) of the Liechtensteinisches Gymnasium comprises three grades (US1, US2 and US3). There are three ways to enter the Liechensteinisches Gymnasium from the Realschule (a type of secondary school offering a less theoretical education). One can enter the second grade (US2) of the Liechtensteinisches Gymnasium from the first grade of the Realschule, the fourth grade (OS1) of the Gymnasium from the third grade of the Realschule, or the fourth grade (OS1) of the Gymnasium from the fourth grade of the Realschule.

All students study the same subjects in each grade. In US1, students study Religious Education, Geography, History, German, Science, Informatics, Technics, Needlework, Art, Music, Physical Education, and Mathematics. In US2, students start studying English, Latin and French. In addition, there is one "class lesson" (or Lebenskunde) per week.

Students may not be exempt from studying the subjects mentioned above in the Unterstufe. They may, however, choose to study additional subjects if they please.

== Oberstufe ==
The Oberstufe (or upper grades) of the Liechtensteinisches Gymnasium comprises four grades (OS1, OS2, OS3 and OS4). In the Oberstufe, the pupils must choose one out of five education tracks:

- Lingua (Latin and Italian)
- Modern languages (Spanish, Italian or Latin)
- Art, Music, and Pedagogy (art, music and pedagogy)
- Economics and Law (business administration, law, and accounting (in OS1 and OS2), and economics (in OS3 and OS4))
- Mathematics and Science (computer science; mathematics, physics, biology, chemistry and geography all have higher numbers of lessons than is usual)

During school, students study a number of base subjects in addition to several classes that form the educational track they choose. Basic subjects include English, German, French, mathematics, physics, and physical education. In OS3 and OS4, students choose elective courses in addition that enhance their specialisation.

Courses in several subjects are only taught in certain grades:

- OS1: Biology, Economics and Law, history, Art, Music, Religious Education and Ethics
- OS2: Biology, Chemistry, Geography, History, Art or Music, Religious Education and Ethics
- OS3: Biology, Chemistry, Geography, Art or Music, Philosophy
- OS4: Geography, Economics and Law, History, Religious Education and Ethics, Philosophy

== Matura ==
In order to meet the requirements to graduate with a Matura (school-leaving diploma), a student must successfully complete OS4, and must receive the mark of “sufficient" in at least two dissertations. Written examinations are held in German, English or French, Mathematics, and a subject related to the student's specialisation. Oral examinations are held in German, Philosophy, Religious Education, Ethics or History, Mathematics, Biology, Physics, Chemistry, Geography or Economics and Law, English, French, Italian, Spanish or Latin, and a subject chosen by the student.
