= Ingrid Hassler-Gerner =

Liechtenstein politician (born 1947)

Member of the Landtag of Liechtenstein for Unterland
- In office 24 October 1993 – 13 March 2005

Personal details
- Born: 4 June 1947 (age 78) Vaduz, Liechtenstein
- Party: Patriotic Union
- Spouse: Raimund Hassler (m. 1972)
- Children: 2

Ingrid Hassler-Gerner (née Gerner; born 4 June 1947) is an accountant and politician from Liechtenstein who served in the Landtag of Liechtenstein from 1993 to 2005.

== Life ==
Gerner was born on 4 June 1947 in Vaduz as the daughter of Emil Gerner and Elisabeth (née Wanger) as one of three children; she attended the St. Elisabeth Monastery. She works as a stock exchange and financial advisor; as of 2011, she was the managing director of the company Pan Portfolio AG.

Hassler-Gerner was president of the Women's Union from 1994 to 1998. She was a member of the Landtag of Liechtenstein from 1993 to 2005; during this time, she was a member of the Liechtenstein delegation to the Inter-Parliamentary Union and the head of the delegation to the OSCE Parliamentary Assembly. In the Landtag, she was a supporter of Equal Opportunities Act, intended to reduce the gender pay gap, which came into force in 1999. She did not seek re-election in the 2005 elections.

From 2005 to 2014 Hassler-Gerner was a member of the board of directors at the National Bank of Liechtenstein.

She married Raimund Hassler on 16 September and they have two children together. She lives in Eschen.
