= Elmar Kindle =

Liechtenstein engineer and politician (born 1968)

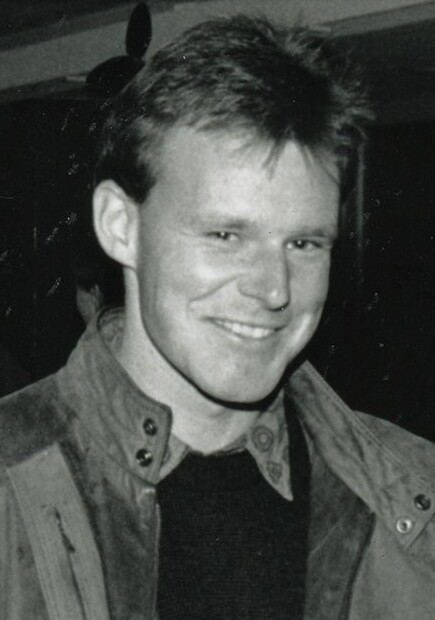
- Kindle in 1991

Member of the Landtag of Liechtenstein for Oberland
- In office 2 February 1997 – 3 February 2013

Personal details
- Born: 21 February 1968 (age 58) Grabs, Switzerland
- Party: Progressive Citizens' Party

Elmar Kindle (born 21 February 1968) is an engineer and politician from Liechtenstein who served in the Landtag of Liechtenstein from 1997 to 2013.

== Life ==
Kindle was born on 21 February 1968 in Grabs as the son of Edwin Kindle and Gertrud (née Moser) as one of three children. He attended secondary school in Balzers before conducting a commercial apprenticeship as a civil engineer draftsman from 1987 to 1991. From 1991 to 1996 he studied civil engineering at the University of Liechtenstein, where he graduated with a diploma. Since 1992, he has worked as a civil engineer at Hoch & Gassner AG in Triesen, and has been its co-owner and managing director since 2005.

Kindle was the president of the Young FBP from 1990 to 1993. He was a member of the Landtag of Liechtenstein from 1997 to 2013 as a member of the Progressive Citizens' Party. During this time, he a member of the Landtag's finance and national committees. He was also the vice president of the Progressive Citizens' Party from 2002 to 2017. He was a member of the board of directors of the Liechtensteiner Volksblatt from 2006 to 2012.

He is a board member of the Liechtenstein Association of Engineers and since 2019 the president of the Association for Special Education in Liechtenstein. He is also president of the Liechtenstein Bobsleigh and Skeleton Club.

He lives in Triesen.
