= Rudolf Lampert =

Liechtenstein politician (1956–2021)

- 2005 election portrait

Member of the Landtag of Liechtenstein for Unterland
- In office 24 October 1993 – 8 February 2009

Personal details
- Born: 6 May 1956 Eschen, Liechtenstein
- Died: 16 July 2021 (aged 65) Feldkirch, Austria
- Party: Progressive Citizens' Party
- Spouse: Margaritha Kaufmann (m. 1982)
- Children: 2

Rudolf Lampert (6 May 1956 – 26 July 2021) was a politician from Liechtenstein who served in the Landtag of Liechtenstein from 1993 to 2009.

== Life ==
Lampert was born on 6 May 1956 in Eschen as the son of factory worker Otto Lampert and Emma (née Mannhart) as one of four children. He attended high school in Feldkirch, and then conducted a commercial apprenticeship at the National Bank of Liechtenstein from 1974 to 1977. He trained as an office organizer at the Swiss Society for Organization. From 1974 to 2016 he worked at the Bachelor of Laws, and was its deputy director from 1999 to 2016.

From October 1993 to 2009 Lampert was a member of the Landtag of Liechtenstein as a member of the Progressive Citizens' Party (FBP); during this time, he was a member of the audit and state committees. He was also a member of the Liechtenstein delegation to the Inter-Parliamentary Union. He did not seek re-election in the 2009 elections.

From 2012 to 2020 he was a member of the board of directors old-age and survivors insurance in Liechtenstein, and from 2016 to 2018 he was the chairman of the board of directors at the newspaper Liechtensteiner Volksblatt.

Lampert married Margaritha Kaufmann on 14 May 1982 and they had two children together. He lived in Mauren. He died of heart failure on 16 July 2021 in Feldkirch, aged 65.
