= Markus Büchel (politician, born 1953) =

Liechtenstein politician (born 1953)

Member of the Landtag of Liechtenstein for Unterland
- In office 1 February 2001 – 8 February 2009

Personal details
- Born: 14 January 1953 (age 73) Eschen, Liechtenstein
- Party: Progressive Citizens' Party
- Spouse: Hildegard Ott (m. 1997)
- Children: 3

Markus Büchel (born 14 January 1953) is a politician from Liechtenstein who served in the Landtag of Liechtenstein from 2001 to 2009. A member of the Progressive Citizens' Party (FBP), he served as the party's spokesman in the Landtag from 2003 to 2009.

== Life ==
Büchel was born on 14 January 1953 in Eschen as the son of farmer Andreas Büchel and Verena, (née Oehri) as one of nine children. He attended secondary school in the municipality before conducting an apprenticeship as a machine draftsman at Hilti in Schaan; from 1974 he studied mechanical engineering in Vaduz, receiving a Dipl. Ing. FH in 1979. He worked at Hilti from 1969 to 1981, and as of 2011 at ThyssenKrupp Presta since then, being the head of human resources.

He was a member of the Ruggell municipal council from 1987 to 1999, and also the deputy mayor of the municipality from 1991 to 1999 as a member of the Progressive Citizens' Party (FBP). Büchel was a member of the Landtag of Liechtenstein from 2001 to 2009; during this time, he was a member of the financial and judicial selection committees. He was also vice president of the FBP from 2000 to 2003 before being the party's spokesman in the Landtag from 2003, a position which he served until 2009; he did not seek re-election in the 2009 elections.

He was a member of the board of directors of the old age and survivors' insurance in Liechtenstein from 1997 to 2004, and its vice president from 2000 to 2004.

Büchel married Hildegard Ott on 27 January 1977 and they have three children together. He lives in Ruggell.
