= Peter Wolff =

President of the Landtag of Liechtenstein from 1997 to 2000

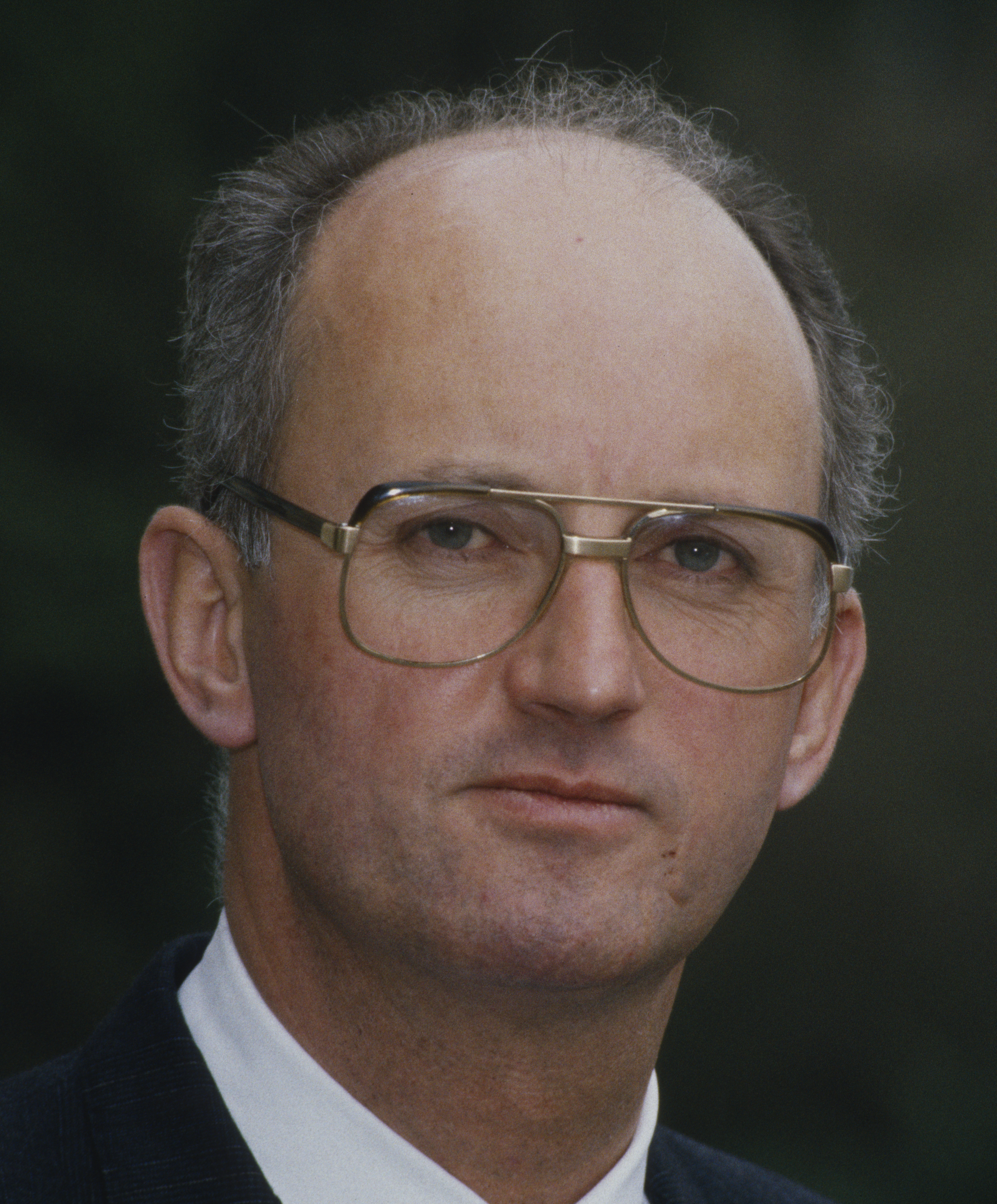
- Wolff in 1992

President of the Landtag of Liechtenstein
- In office January 1997 – December 2000
- Monarch: Hans Adam II
- Vice President: Otmar Hasler
- Preceded by: Paul Kindle
- Succeeded by: Klaus Wanger

Personal details
- Born: 10 May 1946 (age 79) Milan, Italy
- Party: Patriotic Union
- Spouse: Ursula Mikschiczek (m. 1970)
- Children: 2

Peter Wolff (born 10 May 1946) is a politician and attorney from Liechtenstein who served as the President of the Landtag of Liechtenstein from 1997 to 2000. Additionally, he served as a government councillor from 1986 to 1993 and in the Landtag of Liechtenstein from 1993 to 2005.

== Career ==
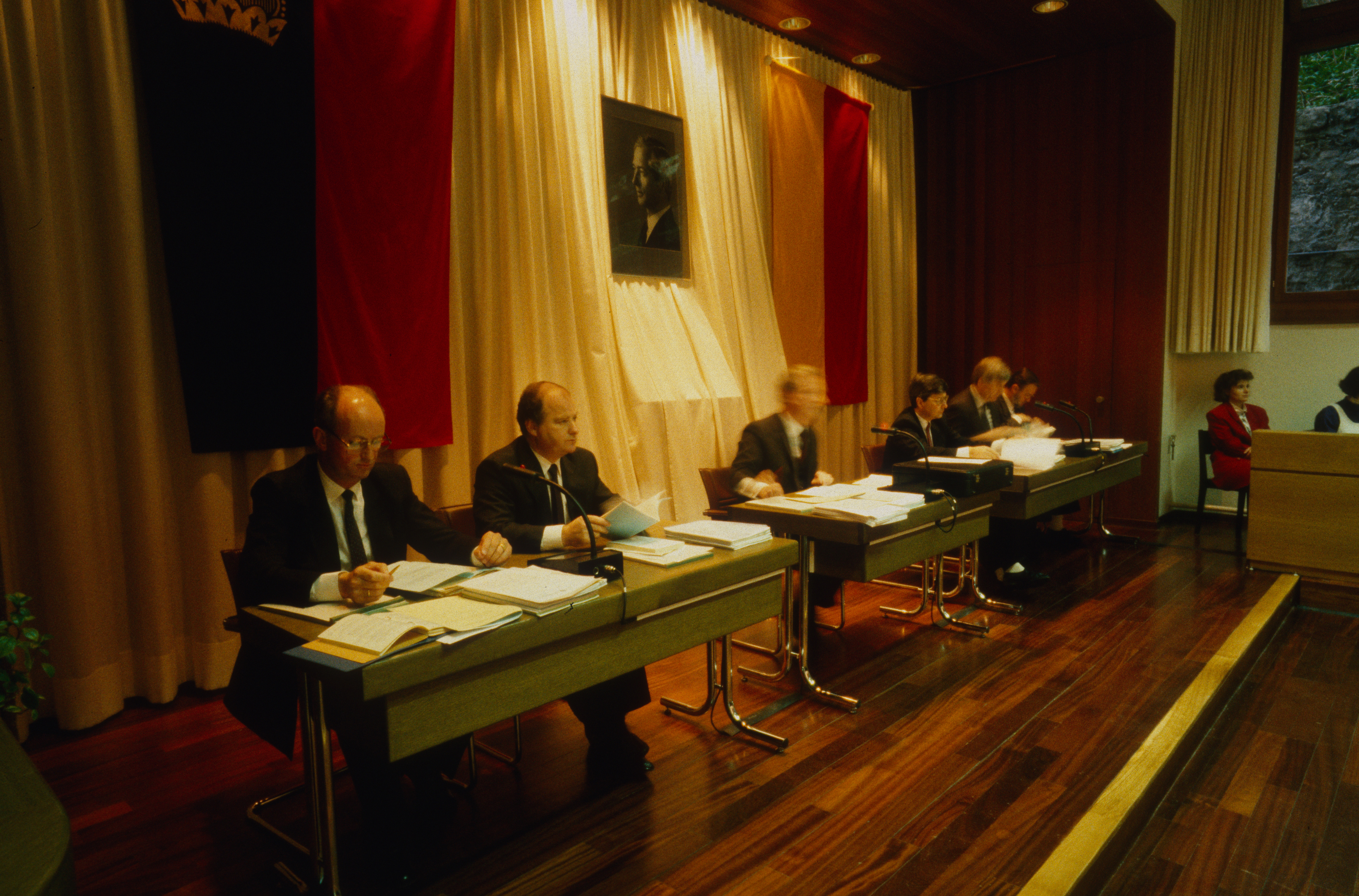
Wolff (first from left) during a session of the Landtag of Liechtenstein, 24 March 1991

Wolff belongs to the Patriotic Union and represented Schaan in the Landtag of Liechtenstein. He was a member of the Landtag from 1993 to 2005.

From 2008, Wolff was the president of the board of directors of the old age and survivors’ insurance in Liechtenstein.

== Personal life ==
Wolff married Ursula Mikschiczek (born 24 September 1948) on 2 July 1970 and they have two children together.
