= Otto Büchel =

Liechtenstein politician (1949–2005)

- 2001 election portrait

Member of the Landtag of Liechtenstein for Unterland
- In office 24 October 1993 – 17 September 2003
- Succeeded by: Alexander Marxer

Personal details
- Born: 6 January 1949 Vaduz, Liechtenstein
- Died: 8 January 2005 (aged 56) Balzers, Liechtenstein
- Party: Patriotic Union
- Children: 1

Otto Büchel (6 January 1949 – 8 January 2005) was a politician from Liechtenstein who served in the Landtag of Liechtenstein from 1993 to 2003.

== Life ==
Büchel was born on 6 January 1949 as the son of farmer Emil Büchel and Erna (née Beck) as one of three children. He attended secondary school in Eschen before conducting an apprenticeship at Hilti in Schaan. He worked as an accountant and also briefly as a firefighter in Ruggell.

He was an avid cyclist, serving as a board member and president of the Liechtenstein Cycling Federation; he was an official at the 1983 UCI Road World Championships in Altenrhein.

From 1975 to 1991 he was a member of the Ruggell municipal council as a member of the Patriotic Union (VU), and was also the deputy mayor of the municipality from 1979 to 1983. He was elected as a member of the Landtag of Liechtenstein in October 1993; during this time, he was the head of the Liechtenstein parliamentary delegation to the European Free Trade Association and European Economic Area.

Büchel suffered from poor health starting from September 2002 and resigned from the Landtag in September 2003 due to health reasons. In October 2004 he moved into a care home in Balzers, where he died of a severe illness on 8 January 2005, aged 56; he was married with one child and lived in Ruggell.
