= List of members of the Landtag of Liechtenstein (1939–1945) =

Members of the Landtag of Liechtenstein in the 22nd legislature

1939–1945 Landtag of Liechtenstein
| ← | 1936–1939 Landtag | 1945–1949 Landtag | → |

Overview
- Term: 9 April 1939 – 29 April 1945
- Election: 1939 Liechtenstein general election
- Government: Third Josef Hoop cabinet (until 1944); Fourth Josef Hoop cabinet (from 1944)

Landtag of Liechtenstein
- Members: 15
- President: Anton Frommelt
- Vice president: Otto Schaedler
- Prime minister: Josef Hoop
- Deputy prime minister: Alois Vogt

Prince Franz Joseph II

The 1939 Liechtenstein general election took place on 4 April 1939 to elect the 15 members of the Landtag, though no actual voting took place. It was the 22nd legislative term and ended on 29 April 1945, overseeing almost all of World War II.

The Landtag consists of the elected members, who then elect the president and the government. Though a new system of proportional representation had been introduced in January 1939, it was not used as no actual voting took place. Instead, the governing Progressive Citizens' Party and opposition Patriotic Union formed a coalition, assigning a roughly equal number of seats each with a pre-determined electoral list, in order to prevent the German National Movement in Liechtenstein from acquiring any seats in the Landtag.

Members Basil Vogt and Ferdinand Risch died in office on 7 August 1939 and 16 April 1940 respectively and were succeeded.

== Composition ==
| Party | Seats |
|---|---|
| Progressive Citizens' Party | 8 |
| Patriotic Union | 7 |
| Total | 15 |
Source: Nohlen & Stöver

== List of members ==
| Constituency | Affiliation | Name | Notes |
|---|---|---|---|
| Oberland | Progressive Citizens' Party | Louis Brunhart | |
| Oberland | Progressive Citizens' Party | Franz Eberle | |
| Oberland | Progressive Citizens' Party | Anton Frommelt | President of the Landtag |
| Oberland | Progressive Citizens' Party | Ferdinand Risch | Died 16 April 1940 |
| Oberland | Progressive Citizens' Party | Bernhard Risch | Succeeded Ferdinand Risch on 7 May 1940 |
| Oberland | Patriotic Union | Johann Beck | |
| Oberland | Patriotic Union | Florian Kindle | |
| Oberland | Patriotic Union | Otto Schaedler | Vice president of the Landtag |
| Oberland | Patriotic Union | Josef Sele | |
| Oberland | Patriotic Union | Basil Vogt | Died 7 August 1939 |
| Oberland | Patriotic Union | Heinrich Andreas Brunhart | Succeeded Basil Vogt on 7 August 1939 |
| Unterland | Progressive Citizens' Party | Oswald Bühler | |
| Unterland | Progressive Citizens' Party | Johann Georg Hasler | |
| Unterland | Progressive Citizens' Party | Franz Xaver Hoop | |
| Unterland | Progressive Citizens' Party | Eugen Schädler | |
| Unterland | Patriotic Union | Rudolf Matt | |
| Unterland | Patriotic Union | Eugen Schädler | |

== Bibliography ==
- Nohlen, Dieter; Stöver, Philip (2010). Elections in Europe: A data handbook. Nomos. ISBN 978-3-8329-5609-7.
- Vogt, Paul (1987). 125 Jahre Landtag (in German). Vaduz: Landtag of the Principality of Liechtenstein.
