= 1949 Liechtenstein general election =

- 6 February 1949
- All 15 seats in the Landtag; 8 seats needed for a majority
- Turnout: 92.3% (▼1.5pp)
| Party | Leader | Vote % | Seats | +/– |
|---|---|---|---|---|
| FBP | Alexander Frick | 52.93 | 8 | 0 |
| VU | Otto Schaedler | 47.07 | 7 | 0 |
This lists parties that won seats. See the complete results below.
Results by constituency
| Prime Minister before | Prime Minister after |
|---|---|
| Alexander Frick; FBP | Alexander Frick; FBP |

General elections were held in Liechtenstein on 6 February 1949 to elect the 15 members of the Landtag. The Progressive Citizens' Party (FBP) won eight seats and retained its majority, while the Patriotic Union (VU) won seven. Voter turnout was 92.3%.

The election campaign was characterized by accusations of misconduct from both parties; with the FBP accusing the VU of involvement in the 1928 Liechtenstein embezzlement scandal and the VU accusing the FBP of incivility. Following the elections, the coalition government between the FBP and VU under the leadership of prime minister Alexander Frick remained. The same year, the VU demanded that the position of president of the Landtag be rotated annually between the two parties, which was accepted for the 1953–1957 legislative period.

== Background ==
In the 1945 general elections, the Progressive Citizens' Party (FBP) retained its majority of eight seats, while the Patriotic Union (VU) won seven. The coalition government under the leadership of prime minister Josef Hoop remained. Hoop resigned in September 1945 under pressure from Franz Joseph II, Prince of Liechtenstein, partly because the prince believed that post-war Liechtenstein required a change of government. He was succeeded by Alexander Frick, who maintained the coalition government, which was reaffirmed as binding in 1946 at the request of Franz Joseph II.

Upon taking office, Frick was faced with the challenge of the pro-Axis First Russian National Army which had taken refuge in Liechtenstein near the end of World War II. Despite pressure from the Soviet Union to extradite the Russians, the Liechtenstein government refused to forcibly extradite those who did not wish to return. His term also saw other challenges such as the transfer of the Ellhorn mountain to Switzerland in 1948 and the social re-integration of former Liechtenstein Nazis, while seven participants of the failed 1939 putsch were convicted in 1946.

== Electoral system ==
The 15 members of the Landtag were elected by open list proportional representation from two constituencies, Oberland with 9 seats and Unterland with 6 seats. Voters voted for a party list and then may have struck through candidates for whom they did not wish to cast a preferential vote, and may also have added names of candidates from other lists. The electoral threshold to win a seat was 18%. Landtag members sit for a four-year term. Once formed, the Landtag elected the prime minister and two government councillors who were then appointed by the reigning prince to govern in a cabinet. The prime minister was appointed for a six-year term, while government councillors sit a four-year term. Only men aged 21 and above were eligible to vote.

== Campaign ==
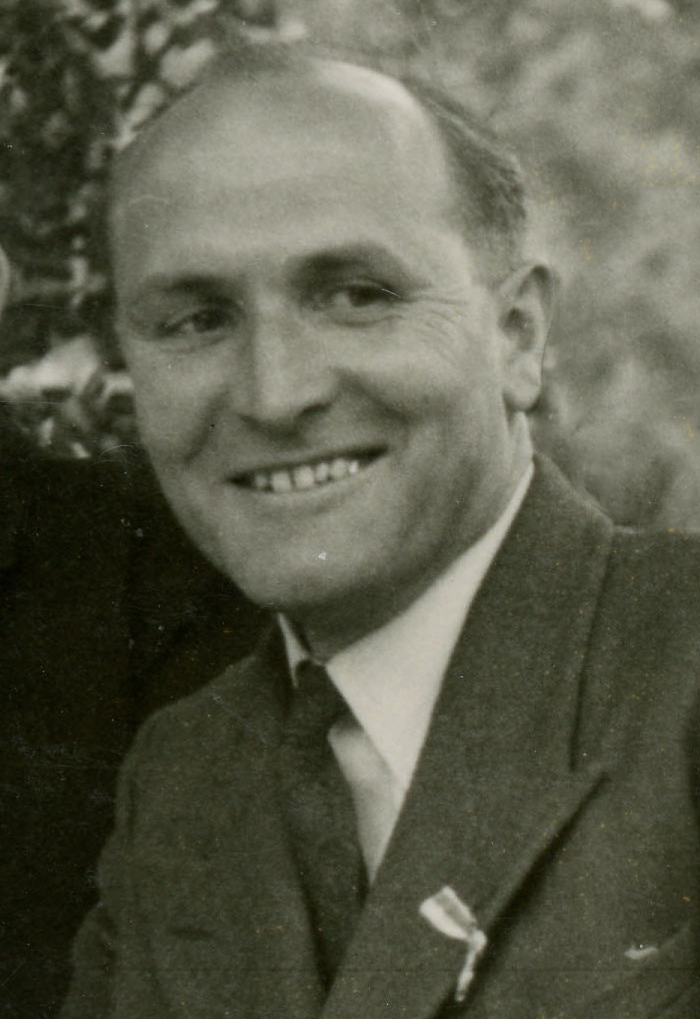
Alexander Frick, pictured in 1954

Both the FBP and VU campaigned through their respective party newspapers, the Liechtensteiner Volksblatt and Liechtensteiner Vaterland. During the election campaign, the FBP highlighted its achievements in office, such as the construction of the Liechtenstein inland canal, the expansion and improvement of roads, social legislation, and the building of a levee on the Rhine. The FBP also criticized the VU for the financial policies of its predecessor party, the Christian-Social People's Party, and also linked the VU to the 1928 embezzlement scandal.

On the other hand, the VU appealed to workers and campaigned on protecting their interests, highlighting its support for the introduction of a workers' protection law and preparations for introducing old-age and survivors insurance in Liechtenstein. The party also highlighted its work in expanding social legislation and insurance, such as accident and health insurance. The VU criticized the FBP for conducting a campaign based on incivility; the VU compared criticism for the 1928 embezzlement scandal to "digging out a broken record" and accused the FBP of malice for connecting the VU to it.

== Candidates ==
Political parties in Liechtenstein required the support of 30 voters from a constituency to be eligible to nominate a candidate list in it. A total of 30 candidates contested the election.

| Oberland | FBP | VU |
|---|---|---|
| Oberland | David Strub; Gustav Ospelt; Tobias Jehle; Fidel Brunhart; Josef Negele; Johann Beck; Emil Falk; Hans Büchel; Engelbert Schädler | Alois Ritter; Wendelin Beck; Heinrich Andreas Brunhart; Johann Wachter; Alois Vogt; Franz Vogt; Josef Sele; Franz Hilbe; Theobald Risch |
| Unterland | FBP | VU |
| Unterland | Eugen Schädler; Rudolf Marxer; Oswald Bühler; Johann Georg Hasler; Hugo Kind; Eduard Oehri | Josef Marxer; Johann Georg Hasler; Arnold Hoop; Alois Hassler; Chrisostomus Öhri; Ludwig Marock |
Source: Liechtensteiner Volksblatt, Liechtensteiner Vaterland

== Results ==
The seat distribution remained unchanged from the 1945 elections, with the FBP winning a majority of eight seats, whereas the VU won seven. Voter turnout was 92.3%.

| Party | Votes | % | Seats | +/– |
|---|---|---|---|---|
| Progressive Citizens' Party | 1,555 | 52.93 | 8 | 0 |
| Patriotic Union | 1,383 | 47.07 | 7 | 0 |
| Total | 2,938 | 100.00 | 15 | 0 |
| Valid votes | 2,938 | 96.90 | | |
| Invalid/blank votes | 94 | 3.10 | | |
| Total votes | 3,032 | 100.00 | | |
| Registered voters/turnout | 3,285 | 92.30 | | |
Source: Nohlen & Stöver

=== By electoral district ===
| Electoral district | Seats | Electorate | Party | Elected members | Substitutes | Votes | % | Seats |
|---|---|---|---|---|---|---|---|---|
| Oberland | 9 | 2,178 | Patriotic Union | Alois Ritter; Wendelin Beck; Heinrich Andreas Brunhart; Johann Wachter; Alois Vogt | Franz Vogt; Josef Sele; Franz Hilbe | 1,018 | 52.1 | 5 |
| Oberland | 9 | 2,178 | Progressive Citizens' Party | David Strub; Fidel Brunhart; Tobias Jehle; Engelbert Schädler | Josef Negele; Johann Beck; Emil Falk | 935 | 47.9 | 4 |
| Unterland | 6 | 1,107 | Progressive Citizens' Party | Eugen Schädler; Oswald Bühler; Rudolf Marxer; Eduard Oehri | Johann Georg Hasler; Hugo Kind | 620 | 62.9 | 4 |
| Unterland | 6 | 1,107 | Patriotic Union | Johann Georg Hasler; Josef Marxer | Alois Hassler; Chrisostomus Öhri | 365 | 37.1 | 2 |
Source: Vogt

== Aftermath ==
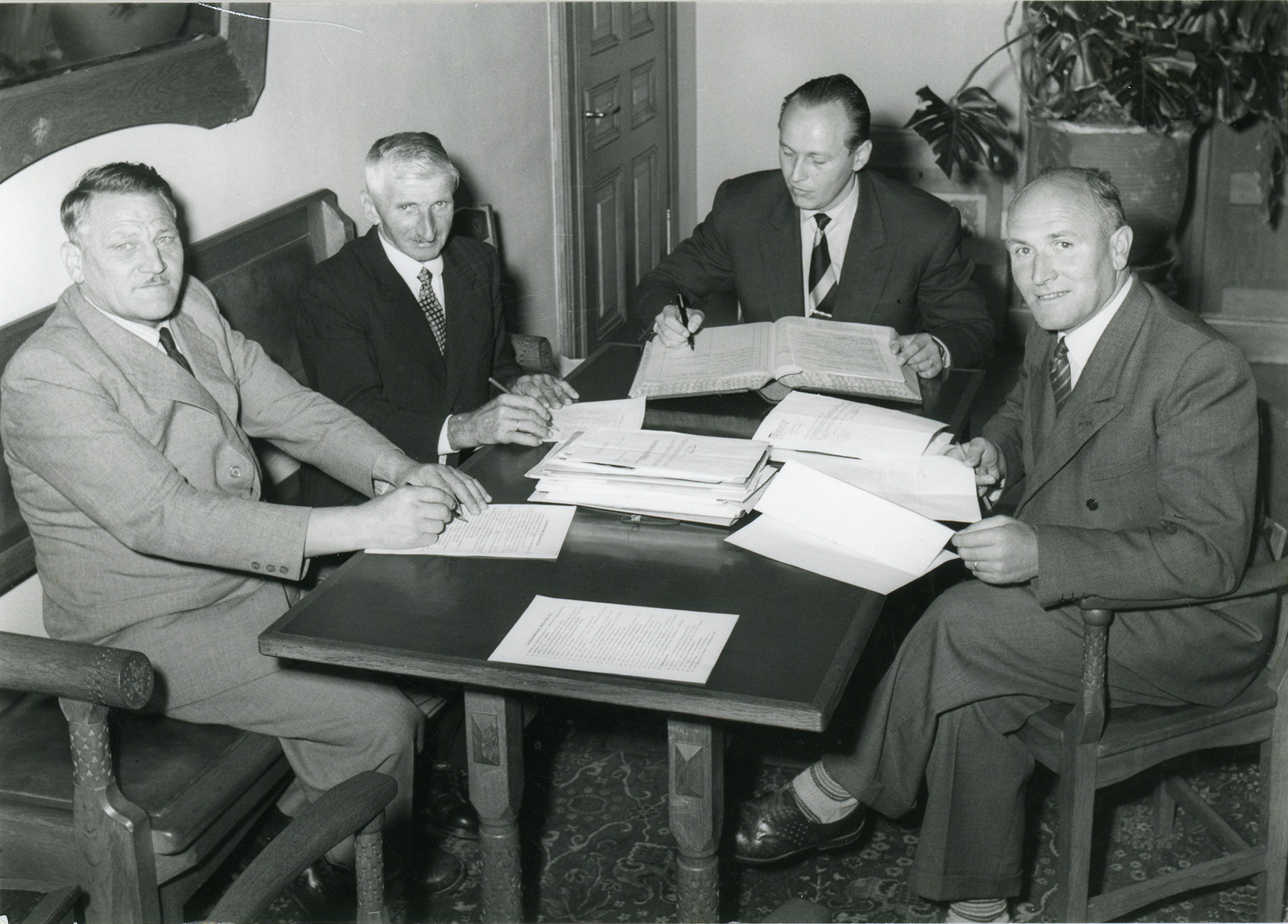
The government of Alexander Frick

Following the elections, the coalition government between the FBP and VU under the leadership of Frick remained. David Strub of the FBP was re-elected as President of the Landtag upon the first session of the newly elected Landtag on 4 March 1949, with Alois Ritter of the VU as vice president. The same year, the VU demanded that the position of president of the Landtag be rotated annually between the two parties, which was accepted for the 1953–1957 legislative period.
