= 1945 Liechtenstein general election =

- 29 April 1945
- All 15 seats in the Landtag; 8 seats needed for a majority
- Turnout: 94.11%
Party	Leader	Vote %	Seats	+/–
FBP	Josef Hoop	54.72	8	0
VU	Otto Schaedler	45.28	7	0
This lists parties that won seats. See the complete results below.
Results by constituency
Prime Minister before	Prime Minister after
Josef Hoop; FBP	Josef Hoop; FBP

General elections were held in Liechtenstein on 29 April 1945 to elect the 15 members of the Landtag. Following the "silent elections" of 1939, they were the first to use the new proportional representation system which had been introduced the same year. The Progressive Citizens' Party (FBP) won eight seats and retained its majority, while the Patriotic Union (VU) won seven. Voter turnout was 93.4%.

The elections were originally set to be held in 1943, as per the Constitution of Liechtenstein, but the government's term had been extended indefinitely by Franz Joseph II, Prince of Liechtenstein in order to prevent the German National Movement in Liechtenstein (VBDL) from entering the Landtag during World War II. Following the elections, the coalition government between the FBP and VU under the leadership of prime minister Josef Hoop remained, but he would resign in September and be succeeded by Alexander Frick.

== Background ==
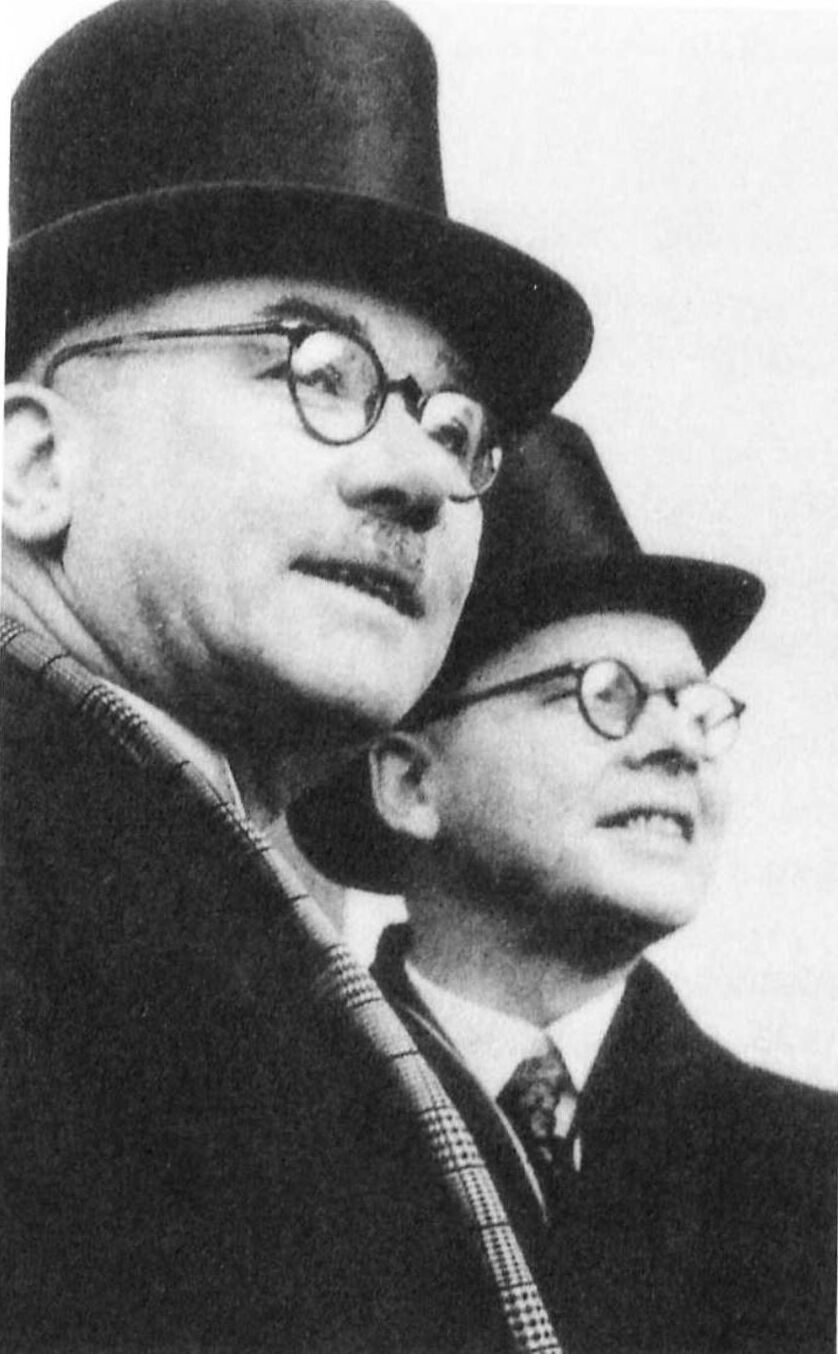
Josef Hoop (left) and VU president Otto Schaedler (right) pictured in 1938

In March 1938, following the Anschluss of Austria, the Progressive Citizens' Party (FBP) and opposition Patriotic Union (VU) formed a coalition government under the leadership of Josef Hoop. A compromise of this coalition was the introduction of proportional representation to the country, which was introduced unanimously in January 1939. Article thirty of the new law allowed for one or more parties, representing at least 80% of the vote share in the previous election to propose a joint list of candidates, and for them to be declared elected while excluding other parties. As such, the previous 1939 elections were only used to assign a roughly equal number of seats to each party in the Landtag, and thus became known as the "silent elections" as no actual voting took place. This clause was enacted as neither party wanted an election campaign that would jeopardize the coalition or allow the Nazi German National Movement in Liechtenstein (VBDL) to gain support.

As per the Constitution of Liechtenstein, the next elections were set to be held in February 1943. However at the request of both the FBP and VU, on 18 February 1943 Franz Joseph II, Prince of Liechtenstein extended the government's term indefinitely via emergency decree to avoid an election campaign during World War II and prevent the VBDL from potentially gaining seats in the Landtag. On 26 March 1945, Franz Joseph II called for new elections; it was the first election in which voting took place since the 1936 elections. A referendum was previously held on 18 March that proposed to increase the amount of seats in the Landtag from 15 to 21, but it was overwhelmingly rejected by voters.

== Electoral system ==
The 15 members of the Landtag were elected by open list proportional representation from two constituencies, Oberland with 9 seats and Unterland with 6 seats. Voters voted for a party list and then may have struck through candidates for whom they did not wish to cast a preferential vote, and may also have added names of candidates from other lists. The electoral threshold to win a seat was 18%. Landtag members sit for a four-year term. Once formed, the Landtag elected the prime minister and two government councillors who were then appointed by the reigning prince to govern in a cabinet. The prime minister was appointed for a six-year term, while government councillors sit a four-year term. The election was the first in Liechtenstein to use a majority clause, where the party with the most votes would automatically win the most seats. Only men aged 21 and above were eligible to vote.

The 18% threshold to win seats, considered to be very high, was primarily intended to prevent the VDBL from winning seats in the Landtag.

== Campaign ==
The March 1945 edition of the magazine Die Jugend, published by Rover Scouts in Liechtenstein, called for people to vote for parties that "stood firmly for God, the Prince, and the Fatherland" and not "former fascists or fascist sympathisers", nor for the "indecisive" or "fair-weather politicians". The FBP in its newspaper Liechtensteiner Volksblatt echoed similar sentiment, and also criticized the VU for its weak stance against the VDBL during the war. On the other hand, the VU appealed to workers and tradespeople while also highlighting the achievements of its predecessor, the Christian-Social People's Party.

The VDBL, for its part, was effectively defunct and played no role in the election campaign. Due to wartime censorship measures still being in effect in Liechtenstein, the election campaign was ultimately timid.

== Candidates ==
Political parties in Liechtenstein required the support of 30 voters from a constituency to be eligible to nominate a candidate list in it. A total of 30 candidates contested the election.

Oberland	FBP	VU
Oberland	David Strub; Bernhard Risch; Richard Meier; Ernst Risch; Fidel Brunhart; Louis Brunhart; Josef Negele; Franz Eberle; Johann Beck	Alois Ritter; Josef Sele; Franz Hilbe; Alois Wille; Florian Kindle; Heinrich Andreas Brunhart; Alois Schädler; Johann Wachter; Alexander Sele
Unterland	FBP	VU
Unterland	Eugen Schädler; Rudolf Marxer; Oswald Bühler; Johann Georg Hasler; Franz Hoop; Philipp Elkuch	Josef Marxer; Arnold Hoop; Chrisostomus Öhri; Alois Hassler; Anton Gchächle; Ludwig Marock
Source: Liechtensteiner Volksblatt

== Results ==
The seat distribution remained unchanged from the 1939 elections, with the FBP winning winning a majority of eight seats, whereas the VU won seven. Voter turnout was 94.1%.

Party	Votes	%	Seats	+/–
Progressive Citizens' Party	1,553	54.72	8	0
Patriotic Union	1,285	45.28	7	0
Total	2,838	100.00	15	0
Valid votes	2,838	97.66		
Invalid/blank votes	68	2.34		
Total votes	2,906	100.00		
Registered voters/turnout	3,088	94.11		
Source: Nohlen & Stöver

=== By electoral district ===
Electoral district	Seats	Electorate	Party	Elected members	Substitutes	Votes	%	Seats won
Oberland	9	2,032	Patriotic Union	Alois Ritter; Josef Sele; Florian Kindle; Heinrich Andreas Brunhart; Johann Wachter	Alois Wille; Alexander Sele	972	51.9	5
Oberland	9	2,032	Progressive Citizens' Party	David Strub; Johann Beck; Fidel Brunhart; Josef Negele	Ernst Risch; Louis Brunhart	901	48.1	4
Unterland	6	1,056	Progressive Citizens' Party	Eugen Schädler; Philipp Elkuch; Johann Georg Hasler; Franz Xaver Hoop	Rudolf Marxer; Oswald Bühler	652	67.6	4
Unterland	6	1,056	Patriotic Union	Josef Marxer; Alois Hassler	Chrisostomus Öhri; Ludwig Marock	313	32.4	2
Source: Vogt

== Aftermath ==
The election results were largely seen as a confirmation of the distribution of seats between the FBP and VU that had been dictated in the 1939 elections. Of the Landtag members elected, approximately two-thirds of them were newcomers; this high turnover of members from the previous election has been accredited to exhaustion from holding the position during wartime, and also reflecting a shift towards new leadership for the post-war period.

Following the elections, the coalition government between the FBP and VU under Josef Hoop remained. However, Hoop would resign as prime minister in September amidst pressure from Franz Joseph II to do so, as the prince believed that post-war Liechtenstein required a change of leadership; this de facto dismissal of Hoop angered many within the FBP. He was succeeded by Alexander Frick, who maintained the coalition government, and in 1946 at the request of Franz Joseph II it was declared binding.
