= List of members of the Landtag of Liechtenstein (1936–1939) =

Members of the Landtag of Liechtenstein in the 21st legislature

1936–1939 Landtag of Liechtenstein
←	1932–1936 Landtag	1939–1945 Landtag	→

Overview
- Term: 3 & 16 February 1936 – 9 April 1939
- Election: 1936 Liechtenstein general election
- Government: Second Josef Hoop cabinet (until 1938); Third Josef Hoop cabinet (from 1938)

Landtag of Liechtenstein
- Members: 15
- President: Anton Frommelt
- Vice president: Otto Schaedler
- Prime minister: Josef Hoop
- Deputy prime minister: Anton Frommelt (until 1938); Alois Vogt (from 1938)

Prince Franz I (until 1938) Franz Joseph II (from 1938)

The 1936 Liechtenstein general election took place on 3 and 16 February 1936 to elect the 15 members of the Landtag. It was the 21st legislative term and ended on 9 April 1939.

The Landtag consists of the elected members (ten elected via Liechtenstein's municipalities, and five via a national vote), who then elect the president and the government. The composition was an absolute majority for the Progressive Citizens' Party, who governed in a majority government.

Member Josef Beck died in office and was succeeded.

== Composition ==
Party	Seats
Progressive Citizens' Party	11
Patriotic Union	4
Total	15
Source: Vogt

== List of members ==
=== By municipal constituency ===
Municipality (constituency)	Affiliation	Name	Notes
Balzers	Patriotic Union	Basil Vogt	
Eschen	Progressive Citizens' Party	Franz Josef Marxer	
Gamprin	Progressive Citizens' Party	Johann Georg Hasler	
Mauren	Progressive Citizens' Party	Emil Batliner	
Ruggell	Progressive Citizens' Party	Franz Xaver Hoop	
Schaan	Progressive Citizens' Party	Ferdinand Risch	
Schellenberg	Progressive Citizens' Party	Philipp Elkuch	
Triesen	Patriotic Union	Ferdinand Heidegger	
Triesenberg	Patriotic Union	Josef Beck	Died in office on 17 May 1936
Triesenberg	Patriotic Union	Wendelin Beck	Succeeded Josef Beck in a by-election on 14 June
Vaduz	Progressive Citizens' Party	Ludwig Ospelt	
Source: Vogt

=== National vote ===
Affiliation	Name	Notes
Progressive Citizens' Party	Johann Beck	
Progressive Citizens' Party	Georg Vogt	
Progressive Citizens' Party	Peter Büchel	
Progressive Citizens' Party	Anton Frommelt	
Patriotic Union	Otto Schaedler	
Source: Vogt

== Bibliography ==
- Nohlen, Dieter; Stöver, Philip (2010). Elections in Europe: A data handbook. Nomos. ISBN 978-3-8329-5609-7.
- Geiger, Peter (1997). Liechtenstein in den Dreissigerjahren 1928–1939 [Liechtenstein in the 1930s 1928–1939] (in German). Vol. 1. Zürich: Liechtenstein Institute, Chronos Verlag. ISBN 3-906393-28-3.
- Vogt, Paul (1987). 125 Jahre Landtag (in German). Vaduz: Landtag of the Principality of Liechtenstein.
