= List of members of the Landtag of Liechtenstein (1932–1936) =

Members of the Landtag of Liechtenstein in the 20th legislature

1932–1936 Landtag of Liechtenstein
←	1928–1932 Landtag	1936–1939 Landtag	→

Overview
- Term: 6 & 13 March 1932 – 3 & 16 February 1936
- Election: 1932 Liechtenstein general election
- Government: First Josef Hoop cabinet

Landtag of Liechtenstein
- Members: 15
- President: Anton Frommelt
- Vice president: Emil Batliner (1932–1933; 1934–1935); Franz Josef Marxer (1933–1934; 1935–1936)
- Prime minister: Josef Hoop
- Deputy prime minister: Anton Frommelt

Prince Franz I

The 1932 Liechtenstein general election took place on 6 and 13 March 1932 to elect the 15 members of the Landtag. It was the 20th legislative term and ended on 3 & 16 February 1936.

The Landtag consists of the elected members (ten elected via Liechtenstein's municipalities, and five via a national vote), who then elect the president and the government. The composition was an absolute majority for the Progressive Citizens' Party, who governed in a majority government.

Member Wilhelm Beck resigned in 1934 and was succeeded.

== Composition ==
Party	Seats
Progressive Citizens' Party	13
Christian-Social People's Party	2
Total	15
Source: Vogt

== List of members ==
=== By municipal constituency ===
Municipality (constituency)	Affiliation	Name	Notes
Balzers	Christian-Social People's Party	Basil Vogt	
Eschen	Progressive Citizens' Party	Franz Josef Marxer	
Gamprin	Progressive Citizens' Party	Wilhelm Näscher	
Mauren	Progressive Citizens' Party	Emil Batliner	
Ruggell	Progressive Citizens' Party	Franz Xaver Hoop	
Schaan	Progressive Citizens' Party	Ferdinand Risch	
Schellenberg	Progressive Citizens' Party	Philipp Elkuch	
Triesen	Progressive Citizens' Party	Adolf Frommelt	
Triesenberg	Christian-Social People's Party	Wilhelm Beck	Resigned in late 1934
Triesenberg	Progressive Citizens' Party	Johann Beck	Succeeded Wilhelm Beck in a by-election on 3 February
Vaduz	Progressive Citizens' Party	Ludwig Ospelt	
Source: Vogt

=== National vote ===
Affiliation	Name	Notes
Progressive Citizens' Party	Anton Frommelt	
Progressive Citizens' Party	Bernhard Risch	
Progressive Citizens' Party	Peter Büchel	
Progressive Citizens' Party	Gebhard Brunhart	
Progressive Citizens' Party	Georg Frick	
Source: Vogt

== Bibliography ==
- Nohlen, Dieter; Stöver, Philip (2010). Elections in Europe: A data handbook. Nomos. ISBN 978-3-8329-5609-7.
- Geiger, Peter (1997). Liechtenstein in den Dreissigerjahren 1928–1939 [Liechtenstein in the 1930s 1928–1939] (in German). Vol. 1. Zürich: Liechtenstein Institute, Chronos Verlag. ISBN 3-906393-28-3.
- Vogt, Paul (1987). 125 Jahre Landtag (in German). Vaduz: Landtag of the Principality of Liechtenstein.
