= 1936 in Liechtenstein =

- Decades: 1910s; 1920s; 1930s; 1940s; 1950s
- See also: History of Liechtenstein; List of years in Liechtenstein

The following is a list of events from the year 1936 in Liechtenstein.

== Incumbents ==
- Prince: Franz I
- Prime Minister: Josef Hoop (Progressive Citizens' Party)
  - First Josef Hoop cabinet (until February)
  - Second Josef Hoop cabinet (from February)
- 20th Landtag (until February)
- 21st Landtag (from February)

== Events ==
- January:
  - 5 January – The Christian-Social People's Party and Liechtenstein Homeland Service merge to form the Patriotic Union (VU).
  - 19 January – The 1936 Liechtenstein local elections take place; the Progressive Citizens' Party (FBP) wins eight mayoral mandates while the VU wins three.
- February:
  - 3 & 16 February – The 1936 Liechtenstein general election takes place; the FBP wins a majority of eleven seats in the Landtag, with the VU winning four.
  - 6–16 February – Liechtenstein competes at the 1936 Winter Olympics in Garmisch-Partenkirchen; it wins no medals.
  - 28 February – The Landtag elects the third Josef Hoop cabinet.
- May:
  - 20 May – Liechtenstein and the United States sign an extradition treaty.
- June:
  - June 14 – A by-election is held in Triesenberg following the death of Landtag member Josef Beck. The result is a win for Wendelin Beck of the VU.
- August:
  - 1–16 August – Liechtenstein competes at the 1936 Summer Olympics in Berlin; it wins no medals.

== Births ==
- 3 November – Werner Gstöhl (d. 2024)

== Deaths ==
- 20 January – Wilhelm Beck (b. 1885)
- 17 May – Josef Beck (b. 1877)
- 25 July – Egon Rheinberger (b. 1870)
- 2 December – Reinold Amann (b. 1849)

== See also ==
- 1936 in Switzerland

== Bibliography ==
- Vogt, Paul (1987). 125 Jahre Landtag [125 Years of the State Parliament] (in German). Vaduz: Landtag of the Principality of Liechtenstein.
