= 1936 Liechtenstein general election =

- 3 February 1936 (first round); 16 February 1936 (second round)
- All 15 seats in the Landtag; 8 seats needed for a majority
- Turnout: 95.51% (▲2.92pp)
Party	Leader	Vote %	Seats	+/–
FBP	Josef Hoop	53.29	11	−2
VU	Otto Schaedler	46.71	4	+2
This lists parties that won seats. See the complete results below.
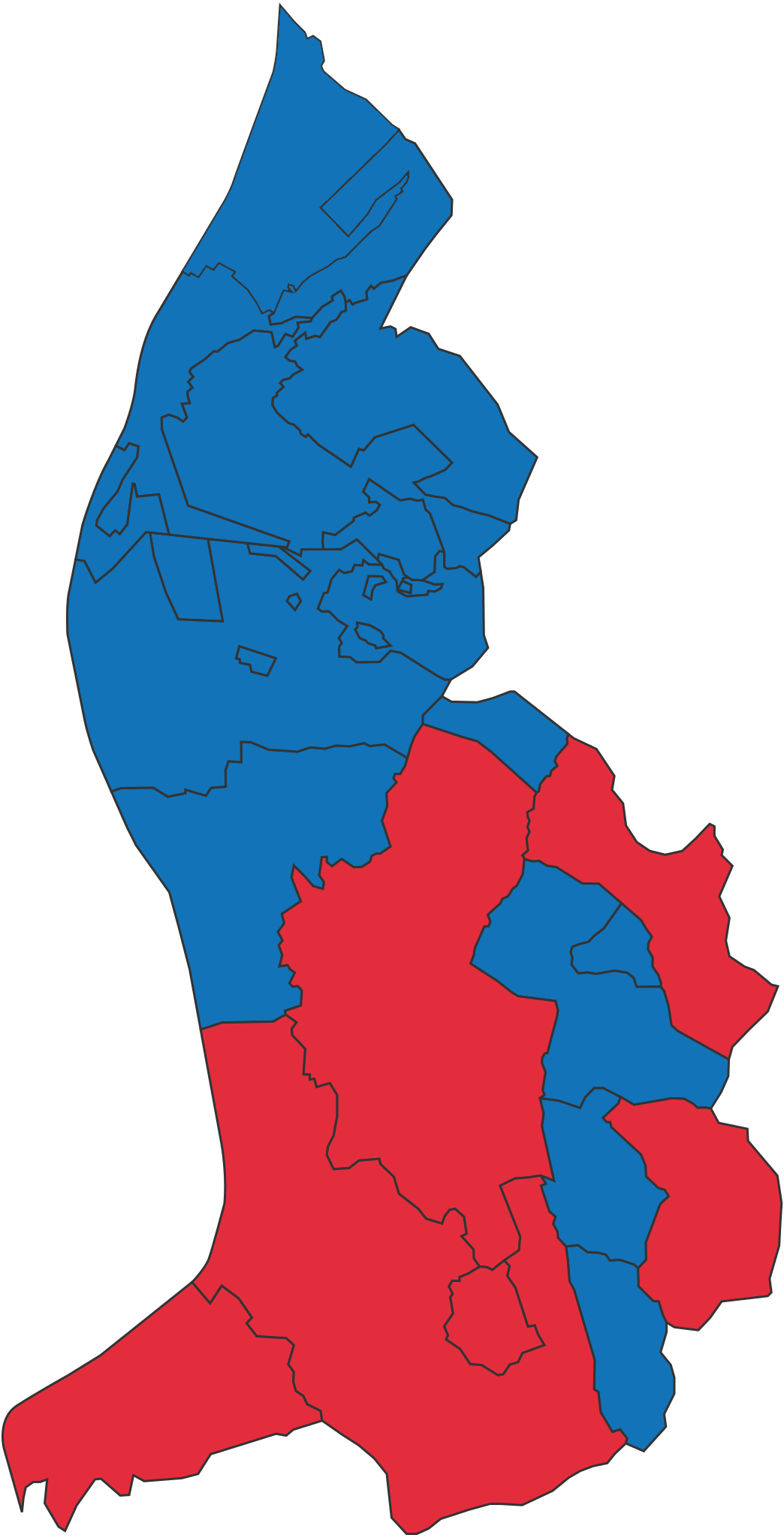
Results by municipality and national vote. Blue denotes seats won by the FBP and red those won by the VU. Planken is grey as no municipal election took place there.
Prime Minister before	Prime Minister after
Josef Hoop; FBP	Josef Hoop; FBP

General elections were held in Liechtenstein on 3 and 16 February 1936 to elect the 15 members of the Landtag. The Progressive Citizens' Party (FBP) won eleven seats and retained its majority in the Landtag. The Patriotic Union (VU), which had been founded the previous month as a merger of the Christian-Social People's Party (VP) and Liechtenstein Homeland Service (LHD), won four seats. Voter turnout was 95.5%.

The election campaign was marked by attacks and accusations by both parties, including that of antisemitism and connections to Nazi Germany. Following the elections, the majority government led by prime minister Josef Hoop remained. The VU had received around 48% of the vote but won only four seats, meaning that previous calls for the introduction of proportional representation were heightened, leading to implementation of a new electoral system in 1939.

== Background ==
The 1932 elections had been held under a new electoral system that replaced the majority system with direct mandates from Liechtenstein's municipalities, intended to ensure that the interests of the municipalities were directly represented in the Landtag. The Progressive Citizens' Party (FBP) won a majority of thirteen seats, and the Christian-Social People's Party (VP) won two. The majority government under the leadership of prime minister Josef Hoop remained, which had been in power since 1928.

Hoop's second term in office was marked by the Rotter kidnapping, when Liechtenstein became the target of press attacks from Nazi Germany for naturalizing German-Jewish theatre managers Fritz and Alfred Rotter. The attacks caused four Liechtensteiner Nazis to unsuccessfully attempt to kidnap the two men and forcefully extradite them to Germany, which resulted in the deaths of Alfred and his wife Gertrud. Afterwards, Hoop's government successfully negotiated the end of German press attacks by agreeing to end naturalizations in Liechtenstein and releasing the perpetrators from prison early.

A new political party, the Liechtenstein Homeland Service (LHD), was founded in 1933. The party initially supported the creation of an authoritarian corporatist state similar to that of Austria under Engelbert Dollfuss, but it quickly moved towards that of Nazism. From 1935, the LHD and VP formed an alliance known as the National Opposition designed to push for the introduction of proportional representation, but the subsequent referendum was narrowly rejected by voters. Motivated by a desire to unite the opposition before the 1936 elections, the two parties merged to form the Patriotic Union (VU) on 5 January 1936. The LHD, despite being the smaller of the two parties, disproportionately dominated the new party; LHD leader Otto Schaedler became party president and prominent LHD member Alois Vogt became party secretary of the VU.

A by-election was held on 3 February 1935 in Triesenberg following the resignation of Wilhelm Beck of the VP. The result was a victory for Johann Beck of the FBP.

== Electoral system ==
Ten members of the Landtag (parliament) were elected via direct mandates for one member representing each of Liechtenstein's eleven municipalities with a population equal to or greater than 300 (all except for Planken). The remaining five members were elected via a national vote using a majority system, wherein the five candidates with the most votes were elected. Landtag members sit for a four-year term. Once formed, the Landtag elects the prime minister and two government councillors who govern in a cabinet. The prime minister is appointed for a six-year term, and government councillors sit for a four-year term. Only men aged 21 and above were eligible to vote.

== Campaign ==
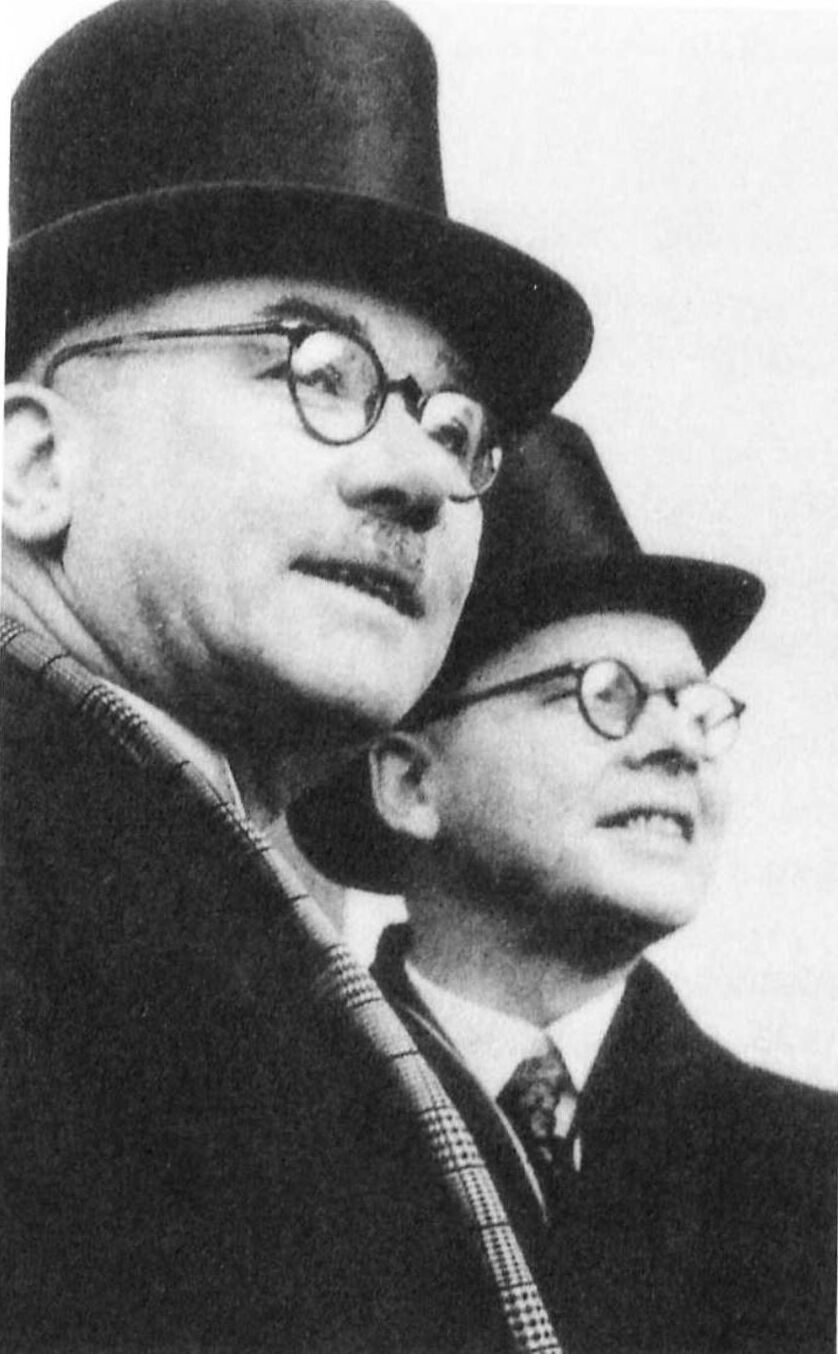
Josef Hoop (left) and Otto Schaedler (right)

Both the FBP and VU campaigned primarily in their respective party newspapers, the Liechtensteiner Volksblatt and the newly formed Liechtensteiner Vaterland. The election campaign was marked by polemics and accusations by both parties, resulting in complaints of "slander" and "incitement" on both sides.

The economy was a major issue of the election; the FBP campaigned on the achievements of Hoop's government, highlighting the building of asphalt roads, the beginning of construction of the Liechtenstein inland canal, expansion of public welfare, and subsidies for agriculture and business. It also attacked the VU for the former VP's failure in the 1928 embezzlement scandal, arguing that the VU could not be trusted with Liechtenstein's finances again. Similarly, the FBP attacked the VU on the LHD's influence in the party, calling the LHD the "root of evil" within the VU. The FBP accused it of seeking to introduce a corporatist Ständestaat, similar to that in Austria under Dollfuss, and "antisemitism in the style of Der Stürmer", a Nazi newspaper. In particular, the Vaterland's openly antisemitic editor, Carl Freiherr von Vogelsang, was particularly attacked by the FBP and was referred to as a "vile political agitator".

The VU fiercely criticized the FBP, focusing on poor economic conditions and rising unemployment, and continued to advocate for the introduction of proportional representation. The party also accused the FBP of distributing welfare and jobs unfairly, and of supporting large retail stores such as Migros instead of domestic businesses. The VU campaigned vaguely on supporting groups such as workers, farmers, and businesses, as well as lowering interest rates, and distributing work more justly, all without cutting spending in other areas. During the campaign, the VU focused particularly on getting Schaedler elected in the national vote, thus neglecting their other candidates.

The Liechtenstein Workers' Association asked both parties to place its president, Franz Hemmerle, as a candidate on their party lists. Similarly, the chamber of commerce (Gewerbeverband) asked both parties to include one or two business representatives on their candidate lists. The VU agreed to both proposals in principle, but as the FBP refused both, neither was carried out.

== Results ==
The FBP won eleven seats, a two-seat decrease from their 1932 performance, and retained its majority in the Landtag. The VU won four, an increase of two from the previous VP. Voter turnout was 95.5%.

Party	Municipal			National			Total seats	+/–
Party	Votes	%	Seats	Votes	%	Seats	Total seats	+/–
Progressive Citizens' Party	1,303	59.25	7	6,432	52.23	4	11	–2
Patriotic Union	896	40.75	3	5,883	47.77	1	4	+2
Total	2,199	100.00	10	12,315	100.00	5	15	–
Total votes	2,510	–						
Registered voters/turnout	2,628	95.51						
Source: Vogt

=== Municipal vote ===
The election of the Landtag members in the municipalities took place on 3 February.

Municipality	Party	Candidate	Votes
Balzers	Patriotic Union	Basil Vogt	218
Balzers	Progressive Citizens' Party	Georg Vogt	148
Eschen	Progressive Citizens' Party	Franz Josef Marxer	158
Eschen	Patriotic Union	—	—
Gamprin	Progressive Citizens' Party	Johann Georg Hasler	51
Gamprin	Patriotic Union	Josef Marxer	39
Mauren	Progressive Citizens' Party	Emil Batliner	168
Mauren	Patriotic Union	—	—
Ruggell	Progressive Citizens' Party	Franz Xaver Hoop	86
Ruggell	Patriotic Union	Fridolin Spalt	50
Schaan	Progressive Citizens' Party	Ferdinand Risch	239
Schaan	Patriotic Union	Josef Schierscher	88
Schellenberg	Progressive Citizens' Party	Philipp Elkuch	51
Schellenberg	Patriotic Union	Alfons Goop	22
Triesen	Patriotic Union	Ferdinand Heidegger	156
Triesen	Progressive Citizens' Party	Adolf Frommelt	92
Triesenberg	Patriotic Union	Josef Beck	175
Triesenberg	Progressive Citizens' Party	Johann Beck	130
Vaduz	Progressive Citizens' Party	Ludwig Ospelt	180
Vaduz	Patriotic Union	Rudolf Amann	148
Source: Vogt

=== National vote ===
The national vote to elect the remaining five Landtag members took place on 16 February.

Party	Candidate	Votes
Progressive Citizens' Party	Johann Beck	1,361
Patriotic Union	Otto Schaedler	1,348
Progressive Citizens' Party	Georg Vogt	1,306
Progressive Citizens' Party	Peter Büchel	1,258
Progressive Citizens' Party	Anton Frommelt	1,255
Progressive Citizens' Party	Lorenz Schierscher	1,252
Patriotic Union	Rudolf Matt	1,173
Patriotic Union	Gottfried Hilti	1,142
Patriotic Union	Heinrich Andreas Brunhart	1,122
Patriotic Union	Wendelin Beck	1,098
Source: Vogt

== Aftermath ==
Immediately following the election, president of the Landtag, Anton Frommelt of the FBP, appeared to have lost re-election, but a bipartisan recount gave him three more votes and won him the seat by a narrow margin. In response, the VU postulated that electoral fraud had taken place and stoked rumours of vote manipulation. VU leaders claimed to have calmed angry crowds in Triesenberg and Balzers, which had been prepared to march on the capital of Vaduz. The VU formally accepted the result of the election in the first session of the Landtag.

The VU had received nearly 47% of the second-round national vote, but only won four seats; the party would have won six or seven seats under a proportional system. Upon the opening of the newly elected Landtag, the VU demanded voluntary proportional representation from the FBP by having several posts, including the vice president of the Landtag and one government councillor, be filled by the VU. Ultimately, as a peace gesture, the FBP agreed to elect Schaedler as vice president in return for "constructive cooperation". This broke from the previous tradition of the vice president being a member of the ruling party from the Unterland. The FBP also elected Alois Schädler to government and generally ensured near-equal representation for the VU in other committees and posts. The new government was elected on 28 February, and Hoop remained as prime minister.

After the election, the VU repeated its calls for the introduction of proportional representation and announced a new popular initiative for 1937. The party ultimately achieved proportional representation with the formation of a coalition government between the FBP and VU in March 1938, and proportional representation was formally introduced to Liechtenstein in 1939.

=== June by-election ===
A by-election was held on 14 June in Triesenberg following the death of Josef Beck in an accident on 17 May. The result was a victory for Wendelin Beck of the VU.

Municipality	Party	Candidate	Votes
Triesenberg	Patriotic Union	Wendelin Beck	190
Triesenberg	Progressive Citizens' Party	Josef Bühler	98
Source: Vogt

== See also ==
- 1936 Liechtenstein local elections
