= 1932 Liechtenstein general election =

- 6 March 1932 (first round); 13 March 1932 (second round)
- All 15 seats in the Landtag; 8 seats needed for a majority
- Turnout: 92.59% (▼0.50pp)
Party	Leader	Vote %	Seats	+/–
FBP	Josef Hoop	60.67	13	+2
VP	Wilhelm Beck	39.33	2	−2
This lists parties that won seats. See the complete results below.
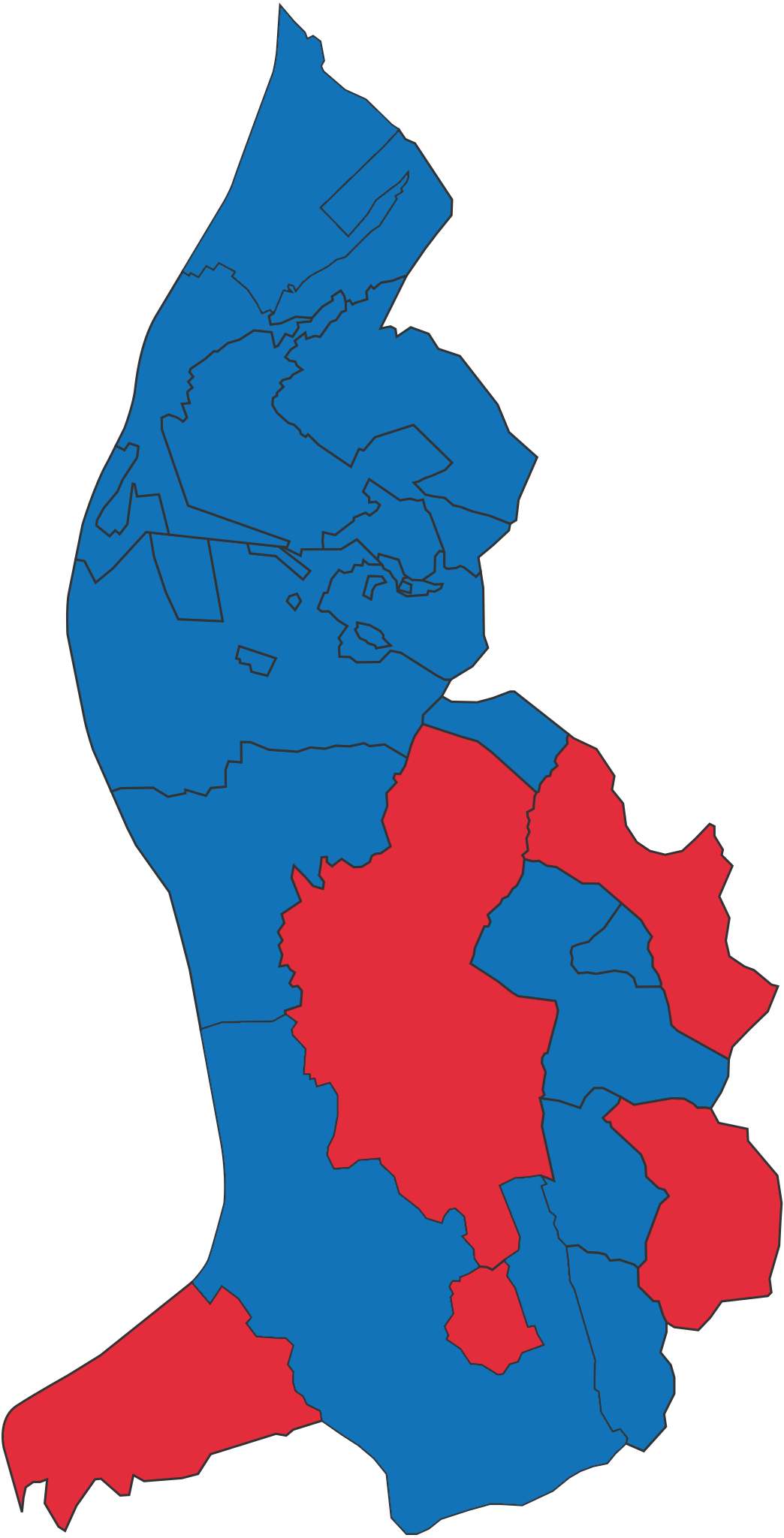
Results by municipality and national vote. Blue denotes seats won by the FBP and red those won by the VP. Planken is grey as no municipal election took place there.
Prime Minister before	Prime Minister after
Josef Hoop; FBP	Josef Hoop; FBP

General elections were held in Liechtenstein on 6 and 13 March 1932 to elect the 15 members of the Landtag. The Progressive Citizens' Party (FBP) won thirteen seats and retained its majority in the Landtag, while the Christian-Social People's Party (VP) won two. Voter turnout was 92.6%.

The elections took place under a new electoral system, which had been introduced in a referendum less than a month earlier. The VP, which was still weakened following the 1928 embezzlement scandal, conducted little campaigning and the election was largely seen as a foregone conclusion in favour of the FBP. Following the elections, the majority government led by prime minister Josef Hoop remained. It was the last election contested by the VP before it merged with the Liechtenstein Homeland Service (LHD) to form the Patriotic Union (VU) ahead of the 1936 elections.

== Background ==
The 1928 elections were called early following the 1928 embezzlement scandal, where Johann II, Prince of Liechtenstein forced the government of Gustav Schädler of the Christian-Social People's Party (VP) to resign. In the election, the Progressive Citizens' Party (FBP) won a majority of eleven seats, while the VP won four. As a result, the FBP formed a majority government ultimately under the leadership of prime minister Josef Hoop.

The government's term was marked by efforts to support economic recovery following the 1927 Rhine flood and the Great Depression from 1929; this included encouraging the opening of new businesses, public works, and social protection policies. Hoop's government was also responsible for approving and initiating the construction of the Liechtenstein inland canal in 1930, which was intended to create jobs and increase the amount of arable land in the country.

In 1930, the VP members of the Landtag resigned as they believed that the Landtag elected in 1928 was a continuation of the term dictated in the April 1926 elections. As a result, a by-election was held (which the VP did not participate in) in which the FBP won the four seats, thus the party held all fifteen seats in the Landtag. The resignations were also intended to tactically support the upcoming VP-initiated referendum on the introduction of proportional representation, but primarily due to opposition from the FBP it was rejected by voters by a significant margin. Instead, an FBP-led initiative to replace the majority system with direct mandates from Liechtenstein's municipalities was approved via referendum less than a month before the 1932 elections; this electoral reform was intended to ensure that the interests of the municipalities were now directly represented in the Landtag.

== Electoral system ==
Ten members of the Landtag (parliament) were elected via direct mandates for one member representing each of Liechtenstein's eleven municipalities with a population equal to or greater than 300 (all except for Planken). The remaining five members were elected via a national vote using a majority system, wherein the five candidates with the most votes were elected. Landtag members sit for a four-year term. Once formed, the Landtag elects the prime minister and two government councillors who govern in a cabinet. The prime minister is appointed for a six-year term, and government councillors sit for a four-year term. Only men aged 21 and above were eligible to vote.

== Campaign ==
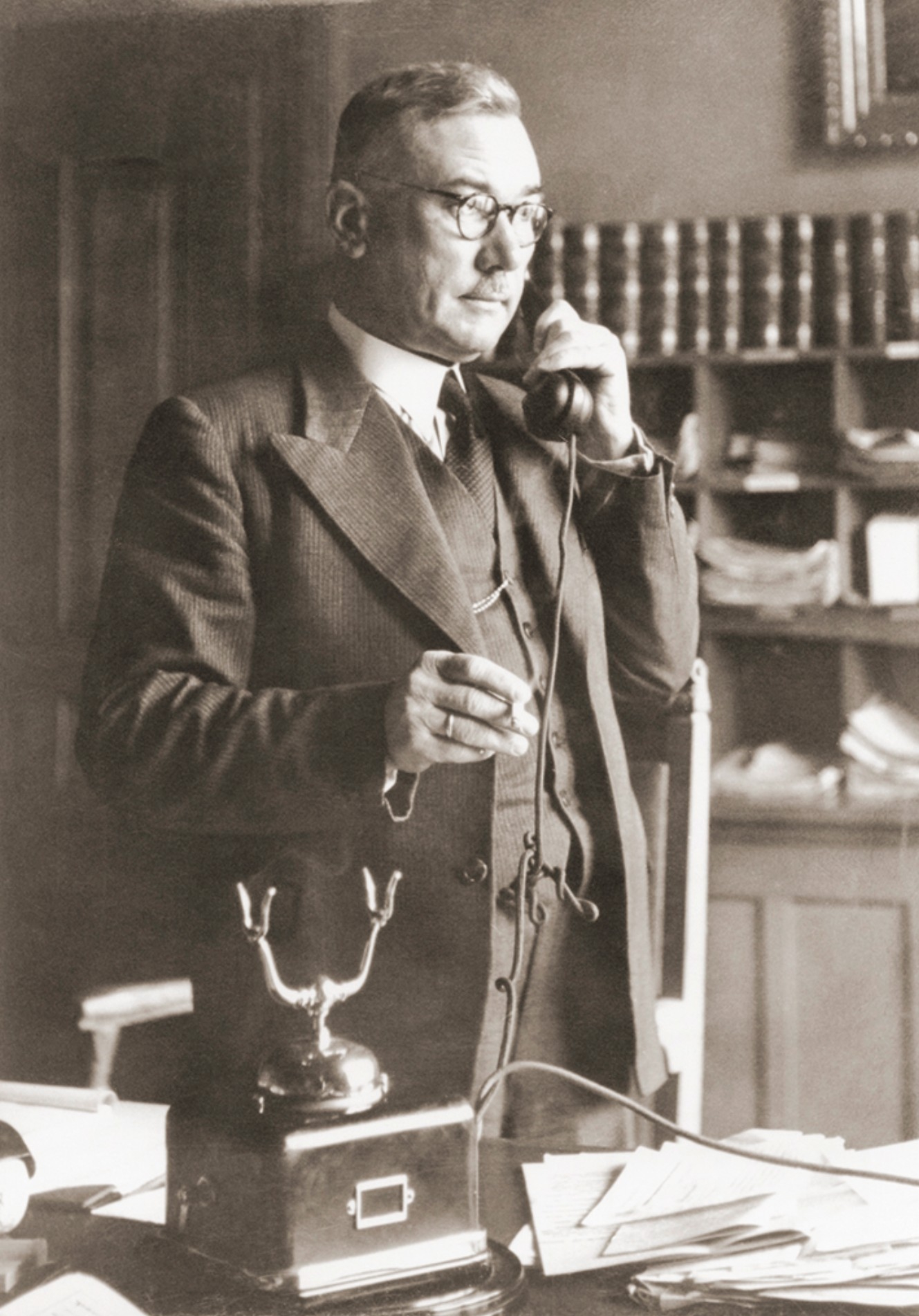
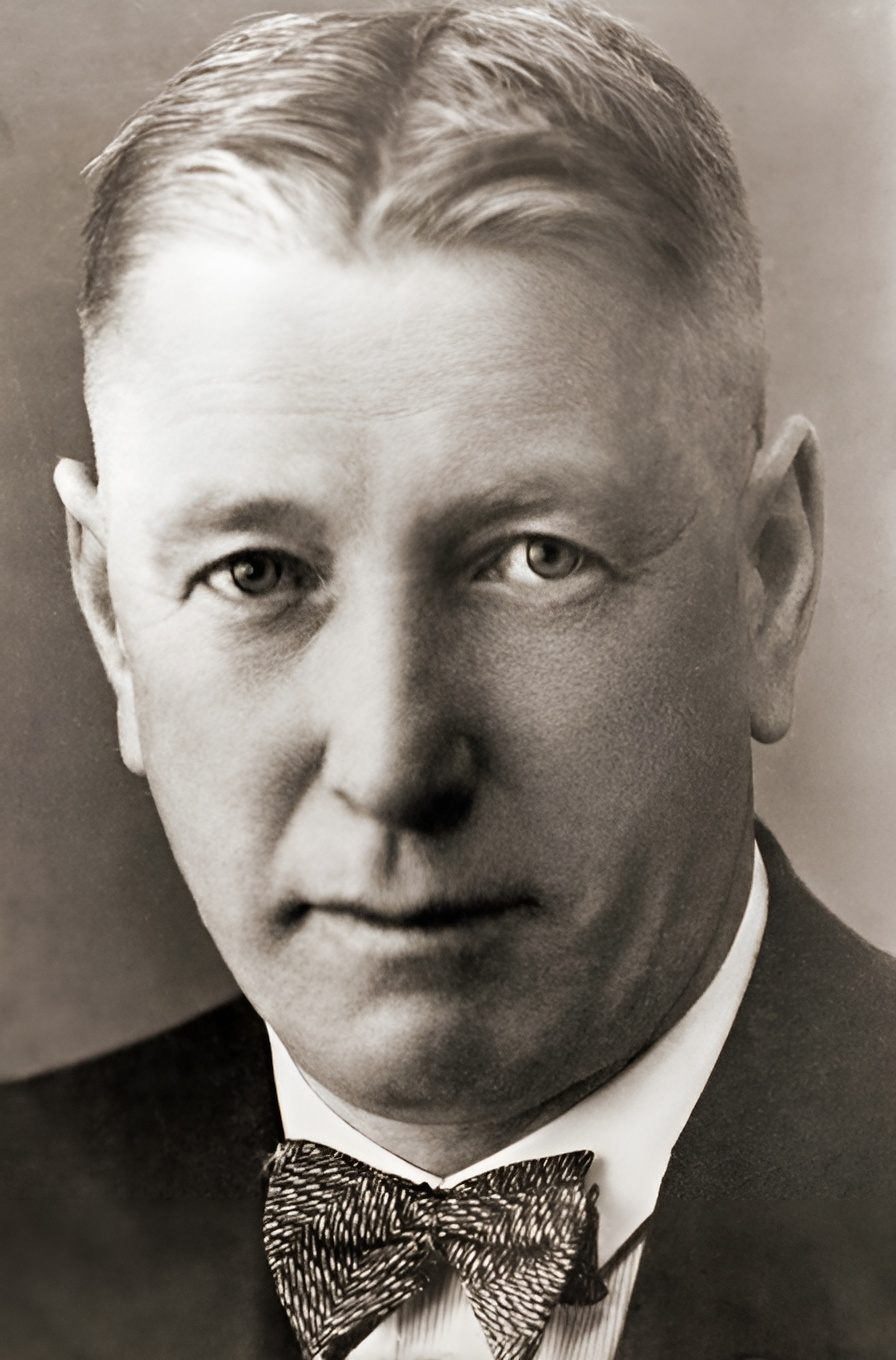
Josef Hoop (left) and Wilhelm Beck (right)

Both the FBP and VP campaigned primarily on their respective party newspapers − the Liechtensteiner Volksblatt and Liechtensteiner Nachrichten – and leaflets. Unlike previous elections, the election campaign was calm. In the campaign, the FBP focused on the party's achievements in office and encouraged voters to elect men of "moral and economic seriousness". Additionally, the FBP continued to discredit the VP in connection to the 1928 embezzlement scandal, and also accused the party of being republican. The FBP had Georg Frick, president of the Liechtenstein Workers' Association, as a candidate in the election, as he was intended to represent the workers in the Landtag.

The VP, on the other hand, conducted a timid campaign and did not attack the FBP on any issues, instead calling for reconciliation; the VP already considered the election lost and it was largely seen as a foregone conclusion in favour of the FBP. However, the VP indirectly accused the FBP of "vote buying". It was reported that the party found difficulty in finding candidates for the election; the party did not present its candidates for the national vote until the day of the election. Former President of the Landtag, Wilhelm Beck, who had an ongoing inditement against him in connection to the embezzlement scandal, was particularly criticized by the FBP.

== Results ==
The FBP won thirteen seats, a two seat decrease from their 1930 by-election number, but a two seat increase from their 1928 performance. The VP won two, an increase of two from 1930 but a decrease of two from 1928. Voter turnout was 92.6%.

Party	Municipal			National			Total seats	+/–
Party	Votes	%	Seats	Votes	%	Seats	Total seats	+/–
Progressive Citizens' Party	1,229	59.26	8	6,294	59.22	5	13	+2
Christian-Social People's Party	845	40.74	2	4,335	40.78	0	2	–2
Total	2,074	100.00	10	10,629	100.00	5	15	–
Total votes	2,173	–						
Registered voters/turnout	2,347	92.59						
Source: Vogt

=== Municipal vote ===
The election of the Landtag members in the municipalities took place on 6 March.

Municipality	Party	Elected member	Votes
Balzers	Christian-Social People's Party	Basil Vogt	184
Balzers	Progressive Citizens' Party	Gebhard Brunhart	122
Eschen	Progressive Citizens' Party	Franz Josef Marxer	120
Eschen	Christian-Social People's Party	Johann Georg Hasler	72
Gamprin	Progressive Citizens' Party	Wilhelm Näscher	55
Gamprin	Christian-Social People's Party	Josef Marxer	34
Mauren	Progressive Citizens' Party	Emil Batliner	186
Mauren	Christian-Social People's Party	—	—
Ruggell	Progressive Citizens' Party	Franz Xaver Hoop	79
Ruggell	Christian-Social People's Party	Anton Biedermann	55
Schaan	Progressive Citizens' Party	Ferdinand Risch	207
Schaan	Christian-Social People's Party	Edmund Risch	91
Schellenberg	Progressive Citizens' Party	Philipp Elkuch	44
Schellenberg	Christian-Social People's Party	Adolf Goop	30
Triesen	Progressive Citizens' Party	Adolf Frommelt	139
Triesen	Christian-Social People's Party	Gebhard Banzer	98
Triesenberg	Christian-Social People's Party	Wilhelm Beck	163
Triesenberg	Progressive Citizens' Party	Heinrich Beck	117
Vaduz	Progressive Citizens' Party	Ludwig Ospelt	160
Vaduz	Christian-Social People's Party	Rudolf Amann	118
Source: Vogt

=== National vote ===
The national vote to elect the remaining five Landtag members took place on 13 March.

Party	Elected member	Votes
Progressive Citizens' Party	Anton Frommelt	1294
Progressive Citizens' Party	Bernhard Risch	1271
Progressive Citizens' Party	Peter Büchel	1262
Progressive Citizens' Party	Gebhard Brunhart	1250
Progressive Citizens' Party	Georg Frick	1217
Christian-Social People's Party	Josef Gassner	896
Christian-Social People's Party	Heinrich Brunhart	880
Christian-Social People's Party	Rudolf Amann	869
Christian-Social People's Party	Julius Wanger	860
Christian-Social People's Party	Ferdinand Heidegger	830
Source: Vogt

== Aftermath ==
Following the election, the majority government under Hoop remained; the FBP agreed to appoint Josef Steger of the VP to government, but he would switch to the FBP during his term. The VP declared that the new electoral system was unfair and planned legal action against it; conversely, the FBP asserted that under the previous electoral system the VP would have likely won no seats.

The success of the FBP came from voters supporting the economic recovery encouraged by Hoop's government. On the other hand, for the VP it demonstrated that the 1928 embezzlement scandal continued to loom over the party, and the poor election result weakened the party further. Though Beck returning to the Landtag was expected to reinvigorate the opposition, this would not come to pass as he contracted an infection the same year and only occasionally attended Landtag sessions, and would resign by 1935. Instead, Basil Vogt was considered the sole de facto representative of the party. The election was the last contested by the VP before it merged with the Liechtenstein Homeland Service to form the Patriotic Union ahead of the 1936 elections.

=== 1935 by-election ===
A by-election was held on 3 February 1935 in Triesenberg following the resignation of Beck. The result was a victory for Johann Beck of the FBP.

Municipality	Party	Candidate	Votes
Triesenberg	Progressive Citizens' Party	Johann Beck	142
Triesenberg	Christian-Social People's Party	Alois Schädler	94
Source: Liechtensteiner Nachrichten
