= 1939 Liechtenstein general election =

- 4 April 1939
- All 15 seats in the Landtag; 8 seats needed for a majority
| Party | Leader | Seats | +/– |
|---|---|---|---|
| FBP | Josef Hoop | 8 | −3 |
| VU | Otto Schaedler | 7 | +3 |
This lists parties that won seats. See the complete results below.
Results by constituency
| Prime Minister before | Prime Minister after |
|---|---|
| Josef Hoop; FBP | Josef Hoop; FBP |

General elections were held in Liechtenstein on 4 April 1939. Although a new system of proportional representation had been introduced to pacify voters at a time when the country was under threat from neighbouring Nazi Germany, it was not used and the elections became known as the "silent elections" as no actual vote was held. Instead, the governing Progressive Citizens' Party (FBP) and opposition Patriotic Union (VU) formed a coalition, assigning a roughly equal number of seats each, in order to prevent the German National Movement in Liechtenstein from acquiring any seats in the Landtag.

== Background ==
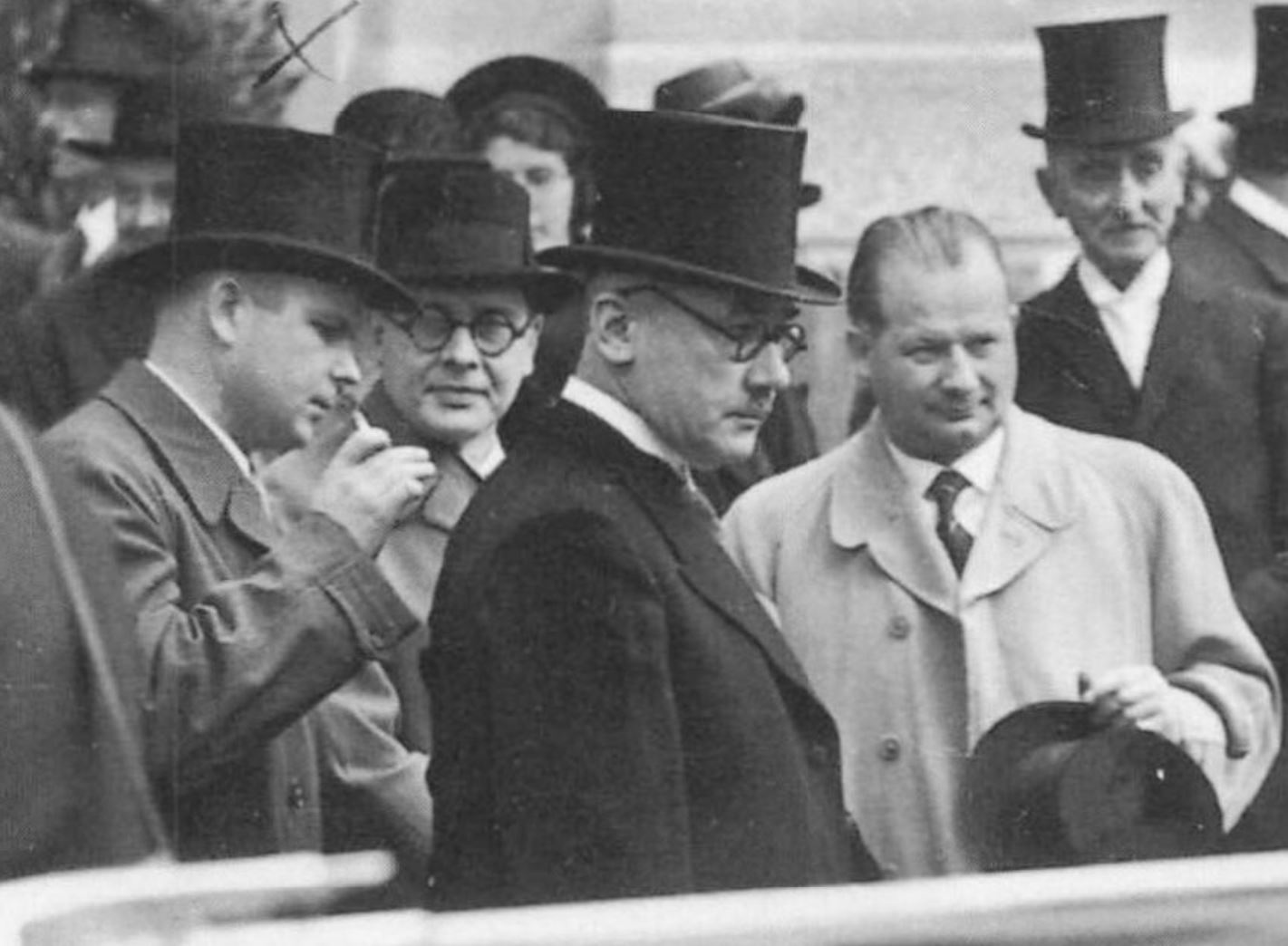
Four major political figures in Liechtenstein in 1938. From left; Alois Vogt, Otto Schaedler, Josef Hoop and Ludwig Marxer.

=== Formation of a coalition government ===
In the wake of the Anschluss of Austria under the initiative of Franz Joseph, the FBP and VU started negotiations for the formation of a coalition government, and was put into effect on 30 March 1938. Under this coalition, deputy prime minister Anton Frommet of the FBP was succeeded by Alois Vogt of the VU. In addition, prime minister Josef Hoop's second cabinet was succeeded by a new cabinet, now containing several members of both parties.

The following day, Franz I, Prince of Liechtenstein made Franz Joseph his regent and then moved to a family-owned estate in Feldberg, Czechoslovakia. He later died on 25 July while at one of his family's castles, Castle Feldberg, with Franz Joseph formally succeeding him. Although Franz I stated that he had given the regency to Franz Joseph due to his old age, it was speculated that he did not wish to remain in control of the principality if Germany were to invade, primarily because his wife Elsa, Princess of Liechtenstein was of Jewish relation. Due to the formation of the coalition government, Liechtenstein Nazis formed the German National Movement in Liechtenstein (VBDL).

A compromise in the coalition agreement was to introduce a proportional representation to the country, despite it being rejected via referendum three years prior, and it was introduced unanimously on 18 January 1939. On 11 March 1939 Franz Joseph II, in agreement with both parties, disbanded the Landtag and called for early elections. The elections were only used to distribute a roughly equal number of seats in the Landtag between the two parties, as such it became known as the "silent election" as no actual voting took place. This was allowed due to article thirty of the new proportional representation law, which allows for one or more parties, representing at least 80% of the vote share in the previous election to propose a joint list of candidates, and for them to be declared elected while excluding other parties. The clause was enacted due to both parties' desire to not hold an election campaign period that would jeopardize the recently formed coalition government and allow for the VDBL to be able to gain support.

=== Attempted putsch ===
On 24 March 1939 a putsch took place, where approximately 40 members of the VDBL starting from Nendeln marched towards Vaduz, planning to provoke a clash between them and the government. Wehrmacht troops from Feldkirch would then move into Liechtenstein in response to a call for help and incorporate the country into Germany. Further coup participants were supposed to close the Triesen-Balzers road and the Vaduz-Sevelen Rhine bridge in the wake of the German invasion, though this did not happen as it was blocked on Adolf Hitler's orders after intervention by Vogt. The plan failed however, as they were stopped by opponents, and most VDBL members were arrested or fled. The coup was unpopular with most people in Liechtenstein and it generated a strong sense of patriotic unity. This caused the Liechtenstein Loyalty Association, which had been founded months prior, to heighten its operations against the VDBL and launch a signature campaign to reaffirm Liechtenstein's independence, which received 2492 signatures.

The scheduled elections is believed to be the primary motivation for the coup, as many within the VDBL saw it as a last hope to gaining power within the country. The election process could have been challenged and been made a subject via referendum, which would have required at least 400 signatures to force an open ballot election. However, this did not happen, and on 6 April the results – a predetermined list of candidates from both parties – were announced.

== Results ==
The FBP maintained its majority in the Landtag and Josef Hoop remained prime minister. However, both the FBP and VU now held a roughly equal number of seats. This coalition between the two parties lasted until 1997.

| Party | Seats | +/– |
|---|---|---|
| Progressive Citizens' Party | 8 | –3 |
| Patriotic Union | 7 | +3 |
| Total | 15 | 0 |
Source: Nohlen & Stöver

=== By electoral district ===
| Electoral district | Seats | Party | Seats won | Elected members | Substitutes |
|---|---|---|---|---|---|
| Oberland | 9 | Patriotic Union | 5 | Johann Beck; Florian Kindle; Otto Schaedler; Josef Sele; Basil Vogt | Rudolf Amann; Heinrich Andreas Brunhart; Meinrad Schädler; Johann Wachter |
| Oberland | 9 | Progressive Citizens' Party | 4 | Louis Brunhart; Franz Eberle; Anton Frommelt; Ferdinand Risch | Johann Beck; Adolf Frommelt; Gustav Jehle; Bernhard Risch |
| Unterland | 6 | Progressive Citizens' Party | 4 | Oswald Bühler; Johann Georg Hasler; Franz Xaver Hoop; Eugen Schädler | Philipp Elkuch; Karl Marxer; Rudolf Marxer |
| Unterland | 6 | Patriotic Union | 2 | Rudolf Matt; Chrisostomus Öhri | Johann Georg Hasler; Konrad Wohlwend |
Source: Vogt
