= 1972 Liechtenstein Landtag size referendum =

1972 referendum in Liechtenstein

- 2 July 1972
- Referendum on increasing the number of members of the Landtag from 15 to 21

Results
Choice	Votes	%
Yes	1,375	48.69%
No	1,449	51.31%
Valid votes	2,824	95.12%
Invalid or blank votes	145	4.88%
Total votes	2,969	100.00%
Registered voters/turnout	4,452	66.69%

A referendum on increasing the number of members of the Landtag from 15 to 21 was held in Liechtenstein on 2 July 1972. As happened in 1945, the proposal was rejected by voters.

== Results ==
Choice	Votes	%
For	1,375	48.7
Against	1,449	51.3
Invalid/blank votes	145	–
Total	2,969	100
Registered voters/turnout	4,452	66.7
Source: Nohlen & Stöver
