= David Strub =

Former President of the Landtag of Liechtenstein

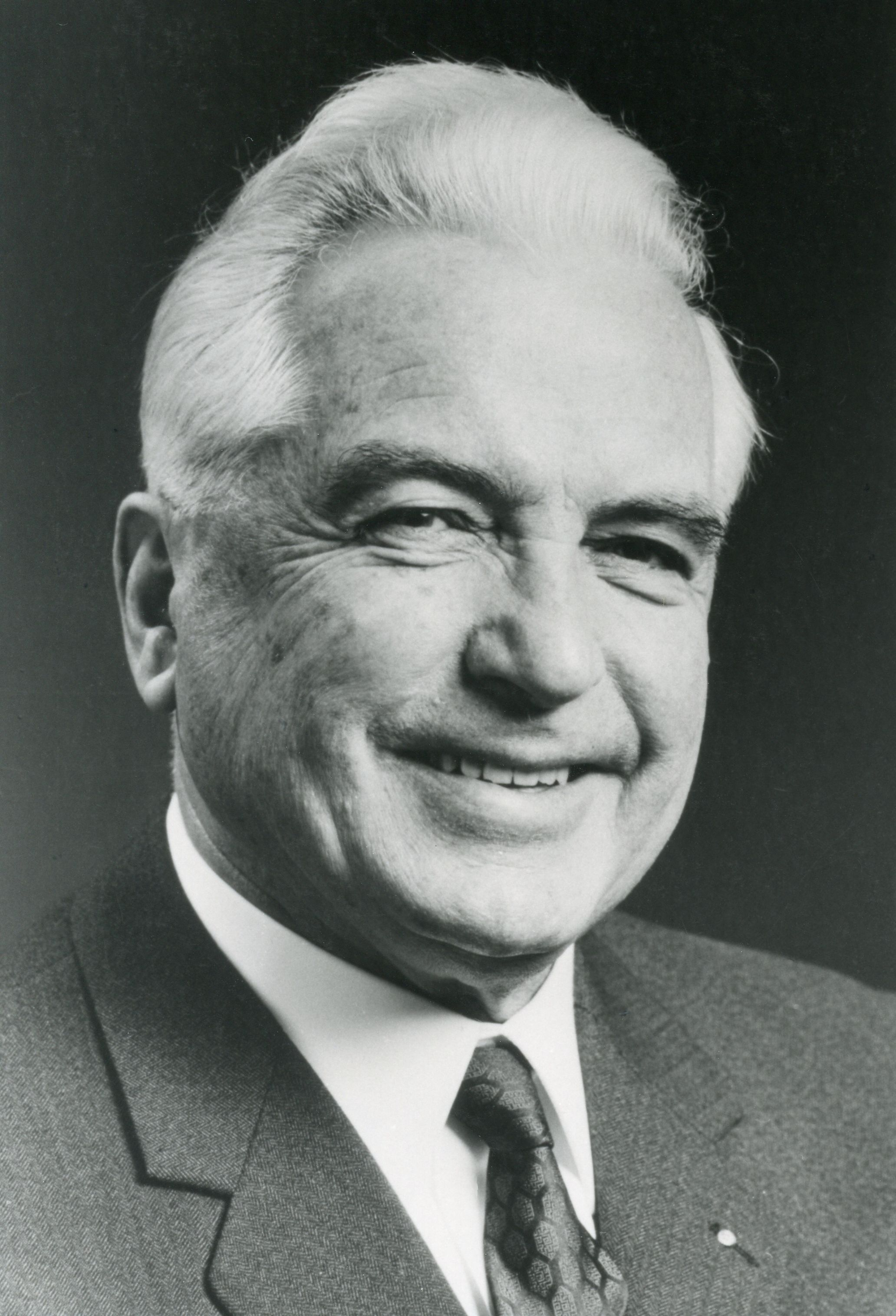
- Strub in 1960

President of the Landtag of Liechtenstein
- In office January 1957 – December 1957
- Monarch: Franz Joseph II
- Vice President: Johann Georg Hasler
- Preceded by: Alois Ritter
- Succeeded by: Josef Hoop
- In office January 1955 – December 1955
- Monarch: Franz Joseph II
- Preceded by: Alois Ritter
- Succeeded by: Alois Ritter
- In office January 1945 – December 1953
- Monarch: Franz Joseph II
- Preceded by: Anton Frommelt
- Succeeded by: Alois Ritter
Additional offices
Member of the Landtag of Liechtenstein for Oberland
In office 29 April 1945 – 1 September 1957
Mayor of Vaduz
In office 1942–1966
Deputy	Meinrad Ospelt
Preceded by	Ludwig Ospelt
Succeeded by	Meinrad Ospelt

Personal details
- Born: 16 September 1897 Vaduz, Liechtenstein
- Died: 15 November 1985 (aged 88) Vaduz, Liechtenstein
- Party: Progressive Citizens' Party
- Spouse: Franziska Grünberger (m. 1928; died 1985)
- Children: 2

David Strub (16 September 1897 – 15 November 1985) was a businessman and politician from Liechtenstein who served as the President of the Landtag of Liechtenstein on three occasions; from 1945 to 1953, in 1955 and in 1957. A member of the Progressive Citizens' Party (FBP), he was also the mayor of Vaduz from 1942 to 1966.

== Life ==
Strub was born on 16 September 1897 in Vaduz as the son of Josef Ritter and Karolina (née Thönyone) as one of five children. He attended secondary school in the municipality before working as a clerk at the Liechtenstein government from 1913 to 1923, and then worked as a businessman and trustee. He was a board member of the Liechtenstein Alpine club from 1931 to 1949.

He was the mayor of Vaduz from 1942 to 1966 as a member of the Progressive Citizens' Party (FBP). During this time, an outdoor swimming pool was built in Mühleholz and a water treatment plant was opened in 1959. During World War II, Strub initiated lighting bonfires during Liechtenstein National Day as a means of defying swastika burnings by Nazi elements in Liechtenstein, which has become a common practice during the holiday since.

Strub was a member of the Landtag of Liechtenstein from 1945 to 1957. He served as the president of the Landtag on three occasions; from 1945 to 1953, in 1955 and in 1957. He was also the vice president of the Landtag in 1954 and 1956.

He was a member of the board of directors of BiL (later LGT Group) from 1945 to 1958 and then the chairman of the board of directors of the National Bank of Liechtenstein from 1959 to 1966. He was president of the Liechtenstein–Switzerland society from 1960 to 1962 and again from 1964 to 1966. He was also president of the Harmoniemusik Vaduz.

== Personal life ==
Strub married Franziska Grünberger (19 April 1900 – 23 June 1985) on 19 April 1928 and they had two children together. His grand-niece, Susanne Eberle-Strub served also in the Landtag from 2017 to 2021.

He died from a long illness on 15 November 1985 in Vaduz, aged 88.

== Honours ==
- Liechtenstein: Commander's Cross of the Order of Merit of the Principality of Liechtenstein (1954)

== Bibliography ==
- Vogt, Paul (1987). 125 Jahre Landtag (in German). Vaduz: Landtag of the Principality of Liechtenstein.
