= Johann Wachter =

Liechtenstein politician (1884–1959)

Member of the Landtag of Liechtenstein for Oberland
- In office 29 April 1945 – 15 February 1953

Personal details
- Born: 26 March 1884; Schaan, Liechtenstein
- Died: 12 August 1959 (aged 75); Schaan, Liechtenstein
- Political party: Patriotic Union
- Spouse: Johanna Josefa Wachter (m. 1912; died 1957)
- Children: 9

Johann Ludwig Wachter (26 March 1884 – 12 August 1959) was a politician from Liechtenstein who served in the Landtag of Liechtenstein from 1945 to 1953.

== Life ==
Wachter was born on 26 March 1884 in Schaan as the son of Johann Valentin and Maria Aloisia Falk as one of four children. He worked as a carpenter and farmer.

From 1924 to 1927 and again from 1930 to 1933 Wachter was a member of the Schaan school board. From 1927 to 1936 and again from 1940 to 1948 he was a member of the Schaan municipal council. He was elected as a deputy member of the Landtag of Liechtenstein in 1939 as a member of the Patriotic Union as a part of the unified list between the party and the Progressive Citizens' Party for the formation of a coalition government, where he served until 1949. He was a full member of the Landtag from 1945 to 1953, and again a deputy member from February to June 1953.

From 1924 to 1958 he was the treasurer of the Liechtenstein health insurance fund, and the managing director of the Liechtenstein farmer's association from 1929 to 1951.

Wachter married Johanna Josefa Wachter (12 March 1887 – 12 July 1957) on 5 February 1912 and they had nine children together.

== Bibliography ==
- Vogt, Paul (1987). 125 Jahre Landtag (in German). Vaduz: Landtag of the Principality of Liechtenstein.
