= Franz Eberle =

Liechtenstein politician (1908–1977)

Member of the Landtag of Liechtenstein for Oberland
- In office 4 April 1939 – 29 April 1945

Personal details
- Born: 12 May 1908 Triesen, Liechtenstein
- Died: 16 January 1977 (aged 68) Triesen, Liechtenstein
- Party: Progressive Citizens' Party
- Spouse: Maria Erne (m. 1931)
- Children: 2

Franz Eberle (12 May 1908 – 16 January 1977) was a politician from Liechtenstein who served in the Landtag of Liechtenstein from 1939 to 1945.

== Life ==
Eberle was born on 12 May 1908 in Triesen as the son of Albert Eberle and Sophie Moritz as one of five children. He worked as a plasterer.

He was elected to the Landtag of Liechtenstein in 1939 as a member of the Progressive Citizens' Party as a part of the unified list between the party and the Patriotic Union for the formation of a coalition government, where he served until 1945. During this time he was a member of the Landtag's finance and audit committee.

Eberle married Maria Erne (14 December 1908 – 13 November 1997) on 11 April 1931 and they had two children together. He died on 16 January 1977 in Walenstadt, aged 68 years old.

== Bibliography ==
- Vogt, Paul (1987). 125 Jahre Landtag (in German). Vaduz: Landtag of the Principality of Liechtenstein.
