= Chrisostomus Öhri =

Liechtenstein politician (1897–1961)

Member of the Landtag of Liechtenstein for Unterland
- In office 4 April 1939 – 29 April 1945

Personal details
- Born: 26 September 1897 Ruggell, Liechtenstein
- Died: 22 October 1961 (aged 64) Grabs, Switzerland
- Party: Patriotic Union
- Spouse: Berta Senti (m. 1916; died 1949)
- Children: 7

Chrisostomus Öhri (26 September 1897 – 22 October 1961), also known as Chrysostomus, was a farmer and politician from Liechtenstein who served in the Landtag of Liechtenstein from 1939 to 1945.

== Life ==
Oehri was born on 26 September 1897 in Grabs, Switzerland as the son of Sebastian Öhri and Wilhelmine Büchel. He worked as a farmer, and he also worked as a miller in Eschen from 1922 to 1930.

From 1927 to 1930 he was a member of the Ruggell municipal council. He was elected to the Landtag of Liechtenstein in 1939 as a member of the Patriotic Union as a part of the unified list between the party and the Progressive Citizens' Party for the formation of a coalition government. From 1945 to 1953 he was a deputy member of the Landtag. He was a substitute judge at the state court of Liechtenstein from 1945 to 1951.

Öhri married Berta Senti (17 April 1890 – 13 July 1949) in on 20 November 1916 and they had seven children together. He died from an unspecified illness on 22 October 1961 in Grabs, Switzerland, aged 64 years old.

== Bibliography ==
- Vogt, Paul (1987). 125 Jahre Landtag (in German). Vaduz: Landtag of the Principality of Liechtenstein.
