= Wendelin Beck =

Liechtenstein farmer and politician (1908–1978)

Member of the Landtag of Liechtenstein for Oberland
- In office 6 February 1949 – 14 June 1953
- In office 14 June 1936 – 4 April 1939

Personal details
- Born: 28 May 1908 Triesenberg, Liechtenstein
- Died: 2 September 1978 (aged 70) Vaduz, Liechtenstein
- Party: Patriotic Union
- Spouse: Ida Sele (m. 1935)
- Relations: Johann Beck (brother)
- Children: 4

Wendelin Beck (28 May 1908 – 2 September 1978) was a farmer and politician who served in the Landtag of Liechtenstein from 1949 to 1953, having previously done so from 1936 to 1939.

== Life ==
Beck was born on 28 May 1908 in Triesenberg as the son of Johann Beck and Luzia (née Erne) as one of four children. Initially working as a plasterer and bricklayer in Liechtenstein and Switzerland, he worked as a farmer from 1935. He leased an inn in Triesenberg from 1943 to 1952.

He was a member of the Liechtenstein Homeland Service, and was part of the committee of the initiative introduce proportional representation to Liechtenstein in 1935, though the subsequent referendum was rejected by voters. Beck was a founding member of the Patriotic Union (VU) in 1936, and was a member of the Triesenberg municipal council from 1936 to 1942 as a member of the party, also serving as deputy mayor of the municipality from 1939 to 1942, and then as municipal treasurer from 1942 to 1975.

Beck unsuccessfully sought election to the Landtag of Liechtenstein in the 1936 elections, but was then elected in a by-election in June following the death of Josef Beck, representing Triesenberg, where he served until 1939. He was again a member from 1949 to June 1953, and finally a deputy member from 1957 to 1958. He was a substitute judge at the Liechtenstein supreme court from 1939 to 1960.

Beck married Ida Sele (13 November 1906 – 2 January 1990) 18 June 1935 and they had four children together. His brother Johann Beck also served in the Landtag. He died on 2 September 1978, aged 70.

== Bibliography ==
- Vogt, Paul (1987). 125 Jahre Landtag (in German). Vaduz: Landtag of the Principality of Liechtenstein.
