= Josef Negele (politician, born 1898) =

Liechtenstein politician (1898–1966)

Member of the Landtag of Liechtenstein for Oberland
- In office 29 April 1945 – 6 February 1949

Personal details
- Born: 21 September 1898 Triesen, Liechtenstein
- Died: 16 May 1966 (aged 67) Chur, Switzerland
- Party: Progressive Citizens' Party
- Spouse: Olga Tschol (m. 1934)
- Children: 1 (adopted)

Josef Negele (21 September 1898 – 16 May 1966) was a politician from Liechtenstein who served in the Landtag of Liechtenstein from 1945 to 1949.

He worked as a farmer and was the commander of the Triesen fire department from 1931 to 1948. He was a deputy member of the Landtag from 1949 to 1953.

== Bibliography ==
- Vogt, Paul (1987). 125 Jahre Landtag (in German). Vaduz: Landtag of the Principality of Liechtenstein.
