= Louis Brunhart =

Liechtenstein politician (1902–1980)

Member of the Landtag of Liechtenstein for Oberland
- In office 4 April 1939 – 29 April 1945

Personal details
- Born: 29 December 1902 Balzers, Liechtenstein
- Died: 16 January 1980 (aged 77) Balzers, Liechtenstein
- Party: Progressive Citizens' Party
- Spouse: Theresia Nutt (m. 1931)
- Children: 3

Louis Brunhart (29 December 1902 – 16 January 1980), also known as Alois, was a politician from Liechtenstein who served in the Landtag of Liechtenstein from 1939 to 1945.

== Life ==
Brunhart was born on 29 December 1902 in Balzers as the son of Gebhard Brunhart and Anna Maria Büchel as one of eight children. He trained as a plasterer and worked as a seasonal worker in Switzerland and Germany and in 1932 he founded a construction company.

He was elected to the Landtag of Liechtenstein in 1939 as a member of the Progressive Citizens' Party as a part of the unified list between the party and the Patriotic Union for the formation of a coalition government, where he served until 1945. During this time, he was a member of the Landtag's finance and state committees. He was a deputy member of the Landtag from 1945 to 1949. From 1945 to 1953, he was a judge at the Liechtenstein administrative appeals court.

Brunhart married Theresia Nutt (19 April 1904 – 13 October 1987) on 9 January 1931 and they had three children together. He died on 16 January 1980 in Balzers, aged 77.

== Bibliography ==
- Vogt, Paul (1987). 125 Jahre Landtag (in German). Vaduz: Landtag of the Principality of Liechtenstein.
