= Josef Sele =

Liechtenstein politician (1897–1969)

Member of the Landtag of Liechtenstein for Oberland
- In office 4 April 1939 – 6 February 1949

Personal details
- Born: 20 November 1897 Vaduz, Liechtenstein
- Died: 5 August 1969 (aged 71) Chur, Switzerland
- Party: Patriotic Union
- Spouse: Berta Kindle (m. 1932)
- Children: 3, including Emma

Josef Sele (20 November 1897 – 5 August 1969) was a politician from Liechtenstein who served in the Landtag of Liechtenstein from 1939 to 1949.

== Life ==
Sele was born on 20 November 1897 in Vaduz as the son of Konrad Sele and Maria (née Beck). He trained as a bricklayer and worked as the profession in South Tyrol from 1915 to 1916 and then in both Liechtenstein and Switzerland from 1917. He was a participant in the 1918 Swiss general strike in Schaffhausen. He became a member of the Liechtenstein Workers' Association in 1920, and was its president from 1941 to 1947, where he was a proponent of worker safety. He was the editor of the Liechtensteiner Nachrichten from 1928 to 1930.

He was elected to the Landtag of Liechtenstein in 1939 as a member of the Patriotic Union as a part of the unified list between the party and the Progressive Citizens' Party for the formation of a coalition government, where he served until 1949. During this time, he was a member of the Landtag's finance and state committees. He was a deputy member of the Landtag from 1949 to February 1953. In the February 1953 Liechtenstein general election, Sele ran as a candidate for the Workers' and Peasants' Party, a party that emerged from the Liechtenstein Employees' Association.

Sele married Berta Kindle (28 August 1906 – 6 January 1970) on 7 April 1932 and they had three children together. His daughter, Emma Brogle-Sele, was also a politician. He died on 5 August 1969 in Chur, aged 71.

== Honours ==
- Liechtenstein: Knight's Cross of the Order of Merit of the Principality of Liechtenstein (1956)

== Bibliography ==
- Vogt, Paul (1987). 125 Jahre Landtag (in German). Vaduz: Landtag of the Principality of Liechtenstein.
