= Josef Marxer (politician, born 1889) =

Liechtenstein politician (1889–1972)

Member of the Landtag of Liechtenstein for Unterland
- In office 29 April 1945 – 15 February 1953

Mayor of Gamprin
- In office 1936–1945
- Preceded by: Wilhelm Näscher
- Succeeded by: Martin Näscher

Personal details
- Born: 29 November 1889 Gamprin, Liechtenstein
- Died: 21 January 1972 (aged 82) Gamprin, Liechtenstein
- Party: Patriotic Union (from 1936); Christian-Social People's Party (before 1936)
- Spouse: Fridolina Mündle (m. 1913; died 1969)
- Relations: Johann Georg Marxer (brother)
- Children: 10

Josef Marxer (29 November 1889 – 21 January 1972) was a farmer and politician from Liechtenstein who served in the Landtag of Liechtenstein from 1945 to 1953. A member of the Patriotic Union (VU), he previously served as he mayor of Gamprin from 1936 to 1945.

== Life ==
Marxer was born on 29 November 1889 in Gamprin as the son of farmer Anton Marxer and Maria (née Hasler) as one of ten children. He worked as a farmer which he took over upon the death of his parents, and was also a member of the board at the Liechtenstein Farmers' Association.

He was a supporter of the opposition group around Wilhelm Beck. He was a member of the Gamprin municipal council from 1924 to 1936 as a member of the Christian-Social People's Party, and then mayor of the municipality from 1936 to 1945 as a member of the Patriotic Union (VU). Marxer unsuccessfully ran for a seat in the Landtag of Liechtenstein in 1936 before being elected in the 1945 elections, where he would serve until February 1953. During this time, he was a member of the Landtag's finance and state committees. He was a judge at the supreme court from 1930 to 1939.

Marxer married Fridolina Mündle (9 May 1889 – 8 March 1969) on 18 August 1913 and they had ten children together. His brother Johann Georg Marxer was a priest. He died on 21 January 1972, aged 82.

== Bibliography ==
- Vogt, Paul (1987). 125 Jahre Landtag (in German). Vaduz: Landtag of the Principality of Liechtenstein.
