= Alois Hassler =

Liechtenstein politician (1906–1993)

Member of the Landtag of Liechtenstein for Unterland
- In office 15 February 1953 – 14 June 1953
- In office 29 April 1945 – 6 February 1949

Personal details
- Born: 20 June 1906 Feldkirch, Austria-Hungary
- Died: 28 May 1993 (aged 86) Grabs, Switzerland
- Party: Patriotic Union
- Spouse: Hermine Meier (m. 1939)
- Children: 5, including Hermann Hassler

Alois Hassler (20 June 1906 – 28 May 1993) was a politician from Liechtenstein who served in the Landtag of Liechtenstein from 1945 to 1949 and again in 1953.

He worked as a farmer until the late 1950s and was the Schellenberg municipal sawyer. He was a member of the Schellenberg municipal council from 1945 to 1954 and was also deputy mayor of the municipality from 1945 to 1951. He was a deputy member of the Landtag from 1949 to 1953 and again from 1962 to 1966.

== Bibliography ==
- Vogt, Paul (1987). 125 Jahre Landtag (in German). Vaduz: Landtag of the Principality of Liechtenstein.
