= Florian Kindle =

Liechtenstein politician (1907–1994)

Member of the Landtag of Liechtenstein for Oberland
- In office 4 April 1939 – 6 February 1949

Personal details
- Born: 25 November 1907; Triesen, Liechtenstein
- Died: 5 July 1994 (aged 86); Triesen, Liechtenstein
- Political party: Patriotic Union
- Spouse: Theresia Mitterer (m. 1936; died 1984)
- Relations: Medea de Novara (sister)
- Children: 6

Florian Kindle (25 November 1907 – 5 July 1994) was a politician from Liechtenstein who served in the Landtag of Liechtenstein from 1939 to 1949.

== Career ==
Kindle was born on 25 November 1907 in Triesen as the son of his father by the same name and Amalie Futscher as one of nine children. He attended school in Tyrol. In 1932, he was a founding member of FC Triesen, and its first president from 1932 to 1936, 1941 to 1956, and finally from 1961 to 1964, where he obtained the nickname Fussballtätta. In addition, he was also a founding member of the Liechtenstein Football Association and its first president from 1934 to 1954 and again from 1964 to 1966. From 1947 to 1951 he was a member of the board of directors at the Liechtensteinische Kraftwerke (LKW, Liechtenstein Power Stations).

He was elected to the Landtag of Liechtenstein in 1939 as a member of the Patriotic Union as a part of the unified list between the party and the Progressive Citizens' Party for the formation of a coalition government, where he served until 1949. During this time, he was a member of the audit committee and was the municipal treasurer of Triesen from 1942 to 1948. During World War II, Kindle managed the distribution of food stamps in Balzers, Triesen and Triesenberg. He was later a mediator in Triesen from 1950 to 1962 and also a municipal councillor from 1957 to 1960.

== Personal life and family ==
Kindle married Theresia Mitterer (10 August 1908 – 13 March 1984) on 26 May 1936 and they had six children together. He died of a heart attack on 5 July 1994 in Triesen, aged 86 years old.

His sister, Medea de Novara, was a Mexican actress who married Mexican film director Miguel Contreras Torres. The couple owned Gutenberg Castle in Balzers from 1951 to 1979.

== Bibliography ==
- Vogt, Paul (1987). 125 Jahre Landtag (in German). Vaduz: Landtag of the Principality of Liechtenstein.
