= 1935 Liechtenstein electoral system referendum =

- 30 May 1935
- Referendum on introducing an electoral system using proportional representation

Results
Choice	Votes	%
Yes	1,182	47.26%
No	1,319	52.74%
Valid votes	2,501	98.00%
Invalid or blank votes	51	2.00%
Total votes	2,552	100.00%
Registered voters/turnout	2,670	95.58%

A referendum on the electoral system was held in Liechtenstein on 30 May 1935. Voters were asked whether they approved of introducing a system using proportional representation. The proposal was rejected by 53% of voters. Nevertheless, a proportional system was later adopted in 1939.

== Results ==
Choice	Votes	%
For	1,182	47.26
Against	1,319	52.74
Total	2,501	100.00
Valid votes	2,501	98.00
Invalid/blank votes	51	2.00
Total votes	2,552	100.00
Registered voters/turnout	2,670	95.58
Source: Nohlen & Stöver
