= Josef Beck (politician, born 1877) =

Liechtenstein politician (1877–1936)

Member of the Landtag of Liechtenstein for Oberland
- In office 16 February 1936 – 17 May 1936
- Succeeded by: Wendelin Beck

Personal details
- Born: 16 February 1877 Triesenberg, Liechtenstein
- Died: 17 May 1936 (aged 59) Grabs, Switzerland
- Political party: Patriotic Union
- Spouse: Hermine Gassner (m. 1906)
- Children: 4

Josef Beck (16 February 1877 – 17 May 1936) was a carpenter and politician from Liechtenstein who served in the Landtag of Liechtenstein in 1936.

He worked as a carpenter, and worked on the renovation of Vaduz Castle. From 1909 to 1915 and again from 1924 to 1927 was a member of the Triesenberg municipal council. He was elected as a member of the Landtag of Liechtenstein in the 1936 Liechtenstein general election, but died in an accident on 17 May, aged 59.
