= Philipp Elkuch =

Liechtenstein politician (1887–1956)

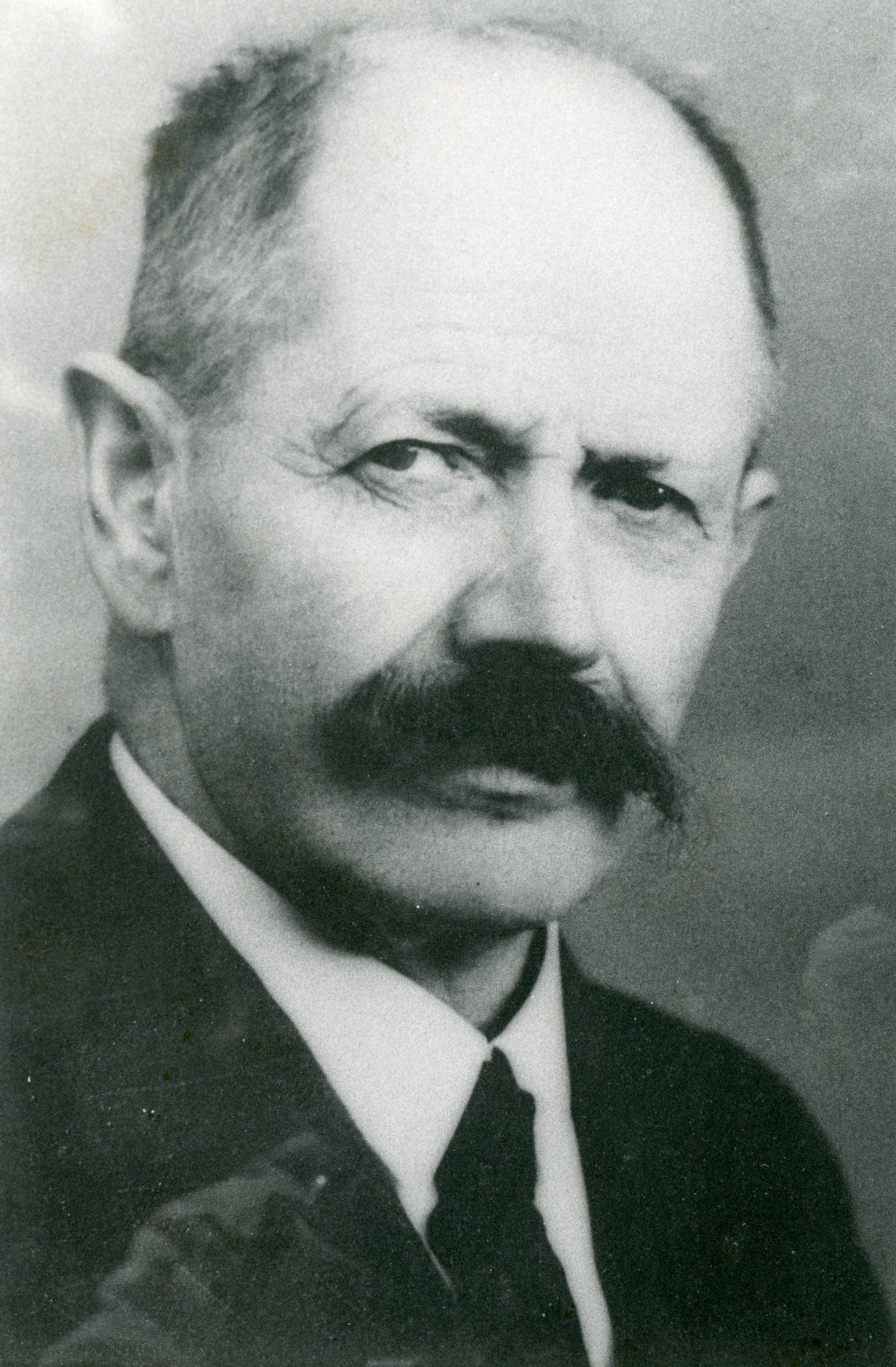
- Elkuch in 1945

Member of the Landtag of Liechtenstein for Unterland
- In office 29 April 1945 – 6 February 1949
- In office 6 March 1932 – 4 April 1939

Mayor of Schellenberg
- In office 1933–1945
- Preceded by: Adolf Goop
- Succeeded by: Urban Rederer

Personal details
- Born: 15 May 1887 Schellenberg, Liechtenstein
- Died: 1 October 1956 (aged 71) Grabs, Switzerland
- Party: Progressive Citizens' Party
- Spouse: Olivia Maria Matt (m. 1930)
- Children: 15, including Edgar
- Parent(s): Ludwig Elkuch; Maria Brendle

Philipp Elkuch (15 May 1887 – 1 October 1956) was a politician from Liechtenstein who served as a member of the Landtag of Liechtenstein from 1932 to 1939 and again from 1945 to 1949. A member of the Progressive Citizens' Party (FBP), he was also the mayor of Schellenberg from 1933 to 1945.

== Life ==
Elkuch was born on 15 May 1887 in Schellenberg as the son of mayor of Schellenberg Ludwig Elkuch and Maria Brendle as one of eight children. He worked as an insurance agent and a farmer and was a collector for Stadtwerke Feldkirch and then later for the Lawena power plant.

Elkuch was considered a leading figure in the Progressive Citizens' Party. He was the mayor of Schellenberg from 1933 to 1945 and also the mediator of the municipality from 1931 to 1937. During his time as mayor, a new primary school and a sawmill were built in 1934. He was a member of the Liechtenstein state tax commission from 1931 to 1950.

He was a member of the Landtag of Liechtenstein from 1932 to 1939 as a member of the FBP. In 1939 Elkuch was elected as a deputy member of the Landtag as a part of the unified list between the party and the Patriotic Union for the formation of a coalition government. During the 1938–1939 crisis, was an advocate in the Landtag for preserving Liechtenstein's independence and party cooperation. He was again a full member of the Landtag from 1945 to 1949.

Elkuch married Klara Ott (13 January 1893 – 9 November 1974) on 26 November 1917 and they had 15 children together. His son Edgar also served as the mayor of Schellenberg. Elkuch was involved in an accident while driving a moped in Gamprin and died shortly afterwards in Grabs hospital on 1 October 1956, aged 71.

== Honours ==
- Liechtenstein: Medal of Merit of the Order of Merit of the Principality of Liechtenstein (1937)

== Bibliography ==
- Vogt, Paul (1987). 125 Jahre Landtag (in German). Vaduz: Landtag of the Principality of Liechtenstein.
