= Ludwig Ospelt =

Liechtenstein politician (1882–1949)

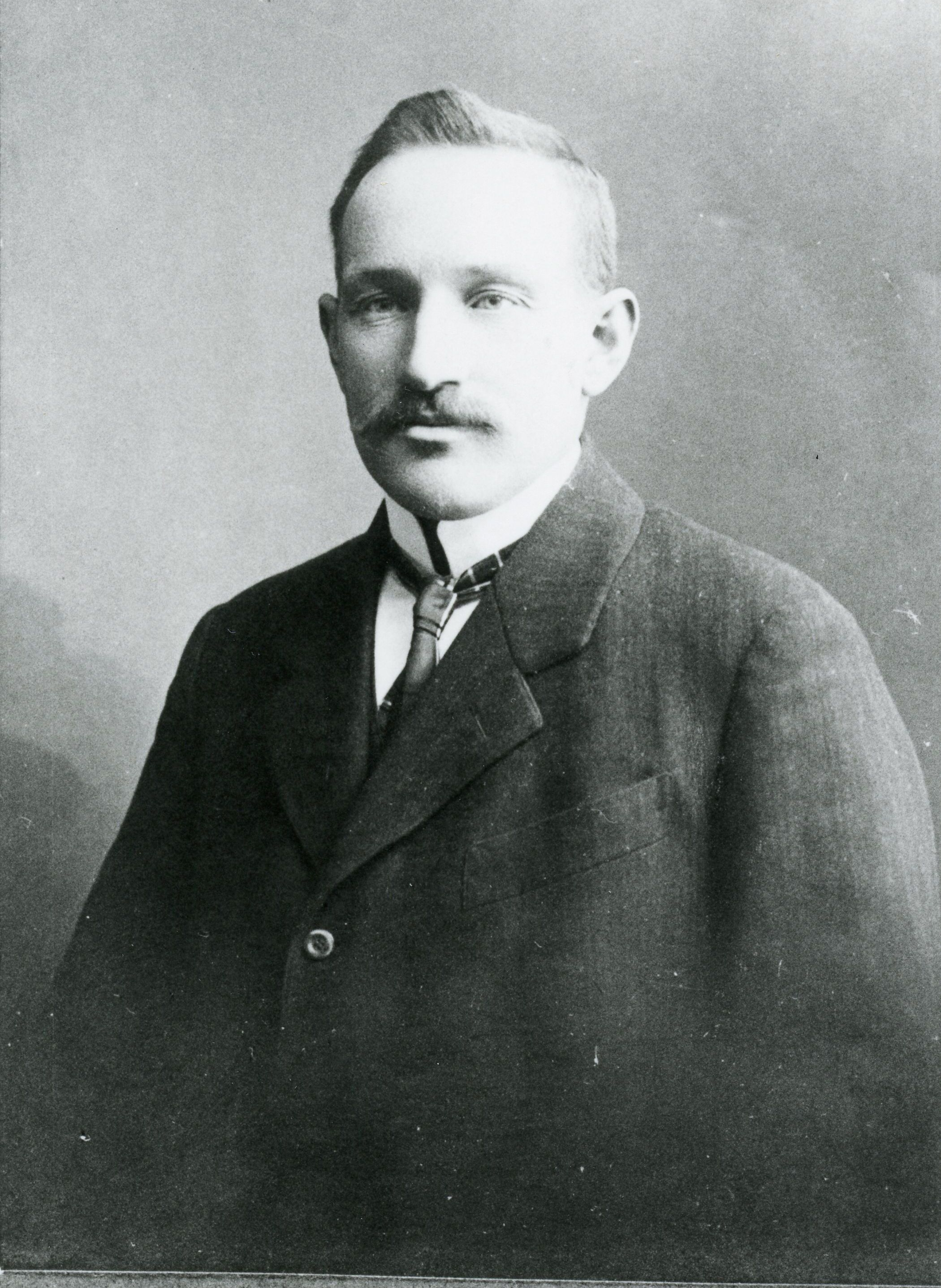

Member of the Landtag of Liechtenstein for Oberland
- In office 6 March 1932 – 4 April 1939

Mayor of Vaduz
- In office 1936–1942
- Preceded by: Bernhard Risch
- Succeeded by: David Strub
- In office 1930–1933
- Preceded by: Bernhard Risch
- Succeeded by: Bernhard Risch

Personal details
- Born: 31 January 1882 Vaduz, Liechtenstein
- Died: 27 October 1949 (aged 66) Zurich, Switzerland
- Party: Progressive Citizens' Party

Ludwig Ospelt (31 January 1882 – 27 October 1949) was a politician from Liechtenstein who served in the Landtag of Liechtenstein from 1932 to 1939. A member of the Progressive Citizens' Party (FBP), he also served as the mayor of Vaduz from 1930 to 1933 and again from 1936 to 1942.

== Life ==
Ospelt was born on 31 January 1882 in Vaduz as the son of builder Joseph Anton Ospelt and Mathilda (née Wachter) as one of six children. He attended construction school in Innsbruck and then worked as a construction worker in the Russian Empire under Johann Beck. Following the death of his father in 1918, Ospelt took over his construction business, which he ran until 1946. From 1933 to 1934 he co-owned the Waldhotel Liechtensteiner Hof, alongside Gustav Ospelt.

From 1921 to 1924 he was a member of the Vaduz municipal council as a member of the Progressive Citizens' Party (FBP). From 1930 to 1933 and again from 1936 to 1942 he was the mayor of Vaduz. During this time, the Liechtenstein state hospital was expanded in 1931, St. Josef church was built, the Vaduz town hall was built in 1933, and a school building in Ebenholz was built in 1937.

From 1932 to 1939 Ospelt was a member of the Landtag of Liechtenstein. During this time, he was a member of the finance commission and the state committee. In 1936 he made a proposal to the Landtag for a pension scheme. He was the consul of the Netherlands in Liechtenstein from 1922 until his death. Throughout World War II, Ospelt campaigned for Liechtenstein's continued independence.

Ospelt was a devout Catholic and a benefactor of the church. He died on 27 October 1949, aged 66.

== Honours ==
- Liechtenstein: Medal of Merit of the Order of Merit of the Principality of Liechtenstein
- Netherlands: Knight of the Order of Orange-Nassau

== Bibliography ==
- Vogt, Paul (1987). 125 Jahre Landtag (in German). Vaduz: Landtag of the Principality of Liechtenstein.
