= Alois Ritter =

President of the Landtag of Liechtenstein in 1954 and 1956

- Ritter in 1960

President of the Landtag of Liechtenstein
- In office January 1956 – December 1956
- Monarch: Franz Joseph II
- Vice President: David Strub
- Preceded by: David Strub
- Succeeded by: David Strub
- In office January 1954 – December 1954
- Monarch: Franz Joseph II
- Vice President: David Strub
- Preceded by: David Strub
- Succeeded by: David Strub

Personal details
- Born: 9 June 1897 Ruggell, Liechtenstein
- Died: 31 January 1966 (aged 68) Vaduz, Liechtenstein
- Party: Patriotic Union
- Other political affiliations: Liechtenstein Homeland Service
- Spouse: Isabella Gassner (m. 1928)
- Children: 3, including Karlheinz Ritter
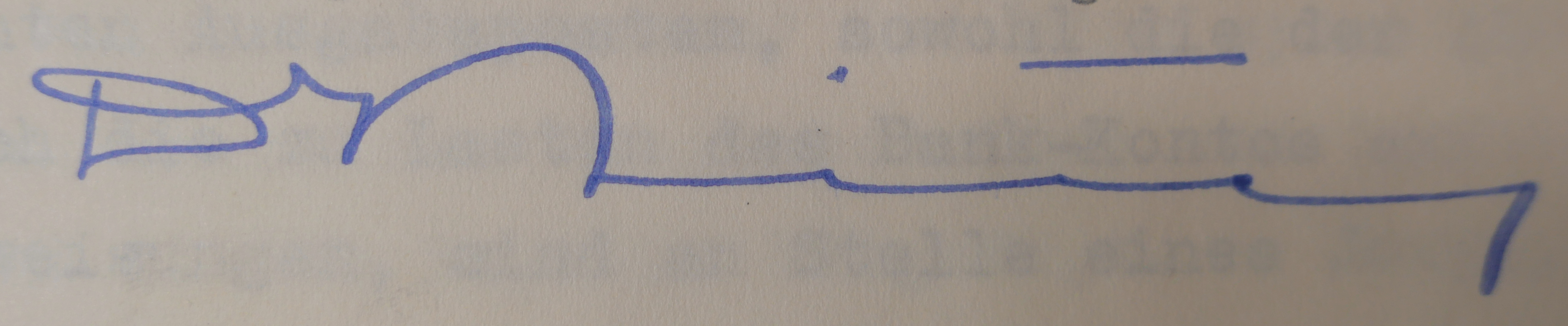
- Signature

Alois Ritter (9 June 1897 – 31 January 1966) was a lawyer and politician from Liechtenstein who served as the President of the Landtag of Liechtenstein in 1954 and again in 1956. He also served in the Landtag of Liechtenstein from 1945 to 1958.

== Early life ==
Ritter was born on 9 June 1897 in Ruggell to the father of embroiderer and farmer Wilhelm Ritter and his mother Maria Biedermann as one of two children. He attended high school in Feldkirch and then studied law in Vienna, where he received a diploma in 1925.

== Career ==
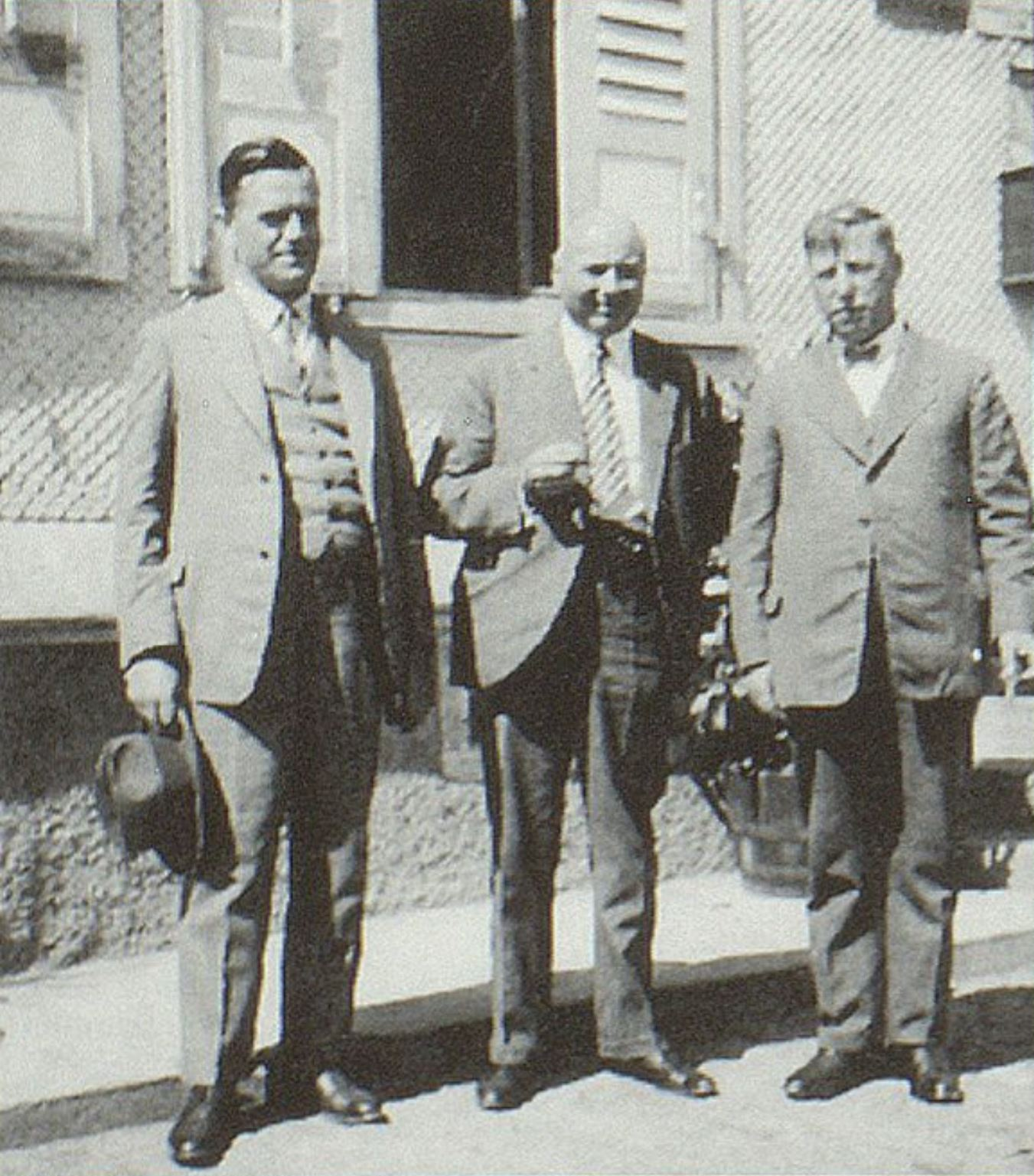
Ritter (left) with Wilhelm Beck (right) in 1931

Ritter worked as a lawyer in Vaduz and in 1926 joined with fellow lawyer Wilhelm Beck in his law firm which became Ritter & Beck Rechtsanwälte. He entered politics as the editor of the Liechtensteiner Volkswirt between 1927 and 1928. He was nominated to be Deputy Prime Minister of Liechtenstein under Gustav Schädler but was defeated in the 1928 Liechtenstein general election by Ludwig Marxer and Josef Hoop.

Ritter became Vice President of the Liechtenstein Homeland Service and then the Vice President of the Patriotic Union under President Otto Schaedler after the Liechtenstein Homeland Service merged with the Christian-Social People's Party to form the party in 1936. He held this position until 1940. He played a key role in negotiations between the Patriotic Union and the Progressive Citizens' Party on forming the coalition government between the two parties overseen by Franz Joseph II in the wake of the Anschluss of Austria. Ritter was a moderate figure within the Patriotic Union and often acted on realpolitik model.

Ritter represented Rudolf Ruscheweyh, the German arms dealer and Abwehr agent, 1944-1945.

He went on to serve in the Landtag of Liechtenstein from 1945 to 1958, where he served as the President of the Landtag of Liechtenstein twice from January 1954 to December 1954 and again from January 1956 to December 1956. He also served as a judge in the Staatsgerichtshof from 1959 to 1966.

Ritter died on 31 January 1966 in Vaduz, at the age of 68 years old.

== Personal life and family ==
Ritter married Isabella Gassner on 29 November 1928 (22 November 1904 – 31 December 1996) and they had 3 children.

His son Karlheinz Ritter took over Ritter & Beck Rechtsanwälte upon his death and later served as the President of the Landtag of Liechtenstein from January 1970 to December 1973 and again from January 1978 to December 1992. Alois Ritter found his final resting place at the cemetery of Vaduz. His wife, their son Karlheinz and his wife Erika, née Kranz (1926-2014), were buried in the same grave.
