= 1945 Liechtenstein Landtag size referendum =

- 18 March 1945
- Referendum on increasing the number of members of the Landtag from 15 to 21

Results
Choice	Votes	%
Yes	498	20.78%
No	1,899	79.22%
Valid votes	2,397	96.27%
Invalid or blank votes	93	3.73%
Total votes	2,490	100.00%
Registered voters/turnout	3,076	80.95%

A referendum on increasing the number of members of the Landtag from 15 to 21 was held in Liechtenstein on 18 March 1945. The proposal was rejected by 79.2% of voters.

== Results ==
Choice	Votes	%
For	498	20.8
Against	1,899	79.2
Invalid/blank votes	93	–
Total	2,490	100
Registered voters/turnout	3,076	80.9
Source: Nohlen & Stöver
