= Basil Vogt =

Liechtenstein politician (1878–1939)

Member of the Landtag of Liechtenstein for Oberland
- In office 6 March 1932 – 7 August 1939
- Succeeded by: Heinrich Andreas Brunhart
- In office 15 July 1928 – 11 February 1930

Mayor of Balzers
- In office 1927–1936
- Preceded by: Gebhard Brunhart
- Succeeded by: Georg Vogt

Personal details
- Born: 10 December 1878 Balzers, Liechtenstein
- Died: 7 August 1939 (aged 60) Steg, Liechtenstein
- Party: Patriotic Union (from 1936); Christian-Social People's Party (before 1936)
- Spouse: Elisabeth Wolfinger (m. 1913)
- Children: 3, including Franz

Basil Vogt (10 December 1878 – 7 August 1939) was a politician from Liechtenstein who served in the Landtag of Liechtenstein from 1928 to 1930 and again from 1932 until his death in 1939. A member of the Christian-Social People's Party and later Patriotic Union, he was also mayor of Balzers from 1927 to 1936.

== Life ==
Vogt was born on 10 December 1878 in Balzers as the son of Valentin Vogt and Regina (née Vogt), as one of eight children. He trained as a carpenter in Wald, Zürich, and worked as a carpenter and farmer in Switzerland and later in Alsace.

From 1927 to 1936 Vogt was the mayor of Balzers as a member of the Christian-Social People's Party (VP). During this time, he oversaw the rising of the Rhine dam and the building of a new water supply from 1934 to 1935. Vogt was elected as a member of the Landtag of Liechtenstein in the 1928 elections but he, along the other VP members of the Landtag, resigned in 1930 over disputes regarding the length of the Landtag's term following the 1928 elections.

Vogt, along with Wilhelm Beck, were the only two VP members elected to the Landtag in the 1932 elections. However, during this time Beck was frequently absent from the Landtag due to prolonged illness, and Vogt was considered to be the defacto representative of the party instead. In 1933, he was the only member who voted against the closure of the Liechtenstein delegation in Bern. He chaired the formation meeting of the Patriotic Union (VU) in 1936. In 1939 he was re-elected as a member of the Landtag as a part of the unified list between the VU and the Progressive Citizens' Party (FBP) for the formation of a coalition government. However, he died from a stroke four months later and was succeeded by Heinrich Andreas Brunhart.

== Personal life ==
Vogt married Elisabeth Wolfinger (5 July 1889 – 28 March 1963) on 24 November 1913 and they had three children together. His son Franz Vogt also served in the Landtag from 1950 to 1953, succeeding Heinrich Andreas Brunhart after his own death.

== Bibliography ==
- Vogt, Paul (1987). 125 Jahre Landtag (in German). Vaduz: Landtag of the Principality of Liechtenstein.
- Geiger, Peter (1997). Liechtenstein in den Dreissigerjahren 1928–1939 [Liechtenstein in the 1930s 1928–1939] (in German). Vol. 1. Zürich: Liechtenstein Institute, Chronos Verlag. ISBN 3-906393-28-3.
