= Johann Georg Hasler (politician, born 1898) =

Liechtenstein politician (1898–1976)

Member of the Landtag of Liechtenstein for Unterland
- In office 3 February 1936 – 6 February 1949

Mayor of Gamprin
- In office 1954–1963
- Preceded by: Martin Näscher
- Succeeded by: Alois Oehri

Personal details
- Born: 29 April 1898 Gamprin, Liechtenstein
- Died: 6 February 1976 (aged 77) Gamprin, Liechtenstein
- Party: Progressive Citizens' Party
- Spouse: Anna Büchel (m. 1934)
- Children: 7
- Parent(s): Johann Hasler; Magdalena Öhri

Johann Georg Hasler (29 April 1898 – 6 February 1976) was a farmer and politician from Liechtenstein who served as a member of the Landtag of Liechtenstein from 1936 to 1949. A member of the Progressive Citizens' Party (FBP), he also served as the mayor of Gamprin from 1954 to 1963.

== Life ==
Hasler was born on 29 April 1898 in Gamprin as the son of Landtag member Johann Hasler and Magdalena (née Öhri) as one of four children. He worked as a farmer. He was a member of the Gamprin fire brigade from 1914 to 1964, and its commander from 1928.

He was elected as a member of the Landtag of Liechtenstein in the 1936 elections as a member of the Progressive Citizens' Party (FBP), a position he would serve until 1949, and he was then a deputy member of the Landtag from 1949 to February 1953. He was also a deputy government councillor from 1949 to 1954.

Hasler served as deputy mayor of Gamprin from 1945 to 1954, and then as the mayor of the municipality from 1954 to 1963. During his time as mayor, a draining project was conducted from 1959 to 1962 and the Liechtenstein Lowlands Water Supply was established in 1960. He was an advocate for industrial growth in Gamprin, and was the chairman of the Gamprin group of the FBP from 1938 to 1963.

Hasler was a member of the Bendern-Gamprin church choir. He married Anna Büchel (13 February 1906 – 12 December 1971) on 12 April 1934 and they had seven children together. He died on 6 February 1976, aged 77.

== Bibliography ==
- Vogt, Paul (1987). 125 Jahre Landtag (in German). Vaduz: Landtag of the Principality of Liechtenstein.
