= Heinrich Andreas Brunhart =

Liechtenstein politician (1902–1950)

Member of the Landtag of Liechtenstein for Oberland
- In office 7 August 1939 – 17 February 1950
- Preceded by: Basil Vogt
- Succeeded by: Franz Vogt

Personal details
- Born: 3 April 1902 Balzers, Liechtenstein
- Died: 17 February 1950 (aged 47) St. Gallen, Switzerland
- Party: Patriotic Union
- Spouse: Elwina Schädler (m. 1932)
- Children: 6
- Parent(s): Heinrich Brunhart; Katharina Vogt

Heinrich Andreas Brunhart (3 April 1902 – 17 February 1950) was a politician from Liechtenstein who served in the Landtag of Liechtenstein from 1939 until his death in 1950.

== Life ==
Brunhart was born 3 April 1902 in Balzers as the son of Landtag member Heinrich Brunhart and Katharina (née) Vogt as one of four children. After his education, Brunhart worked in the construction industry in different European countries. Following his return to Liechtenstein, he worked as a farmer.

He was a founding member of the Patriotic Union (VU) in 1936. From 1933 to 1936 he was the municipal treasurer of Balzers, and from 1936 to 1945 he was deputy mayor of the municipality as a member of the VU. From 1936 to 1938 he was a deputy government councillor under the government of Josef Hoop. In the 1939 elections, he was elected as a deputy member of the Landtag of Liechtenstein as a part of the unified list between the VU and the Progressive Citizens' Party for the formation of a coalition government. On 7 August 1939, Brunhart succeeded Basil Vogt as a full member of the Landtag following his death on the same day, where he served until his own death in 1950.

During his time in the Landtag, he was a prominent opponent of the transfer of the Ellhorn to Switzerland. The community in Balzers rejected the transfer in November 1948, however it was accepted by the Landtag the following month, and finalised in 1949. From 1938 to 1950 Brunhart was a member of the board at the National Bank of Liechtenstein.

Brunhart married Elwina Schädler (16 January 1902 – 30 March 1992) on 18 January 1932 and they had one child together. He died unexpectedly of a disease in the hospital of St. Gallen on 17 February 1950, aged 47.

== Bibliography ==
- Vogt, Paul (1987). 125 Jahre Landtag (in German). Vaduz: Landtag of the Principality of Liechtenstein.
