= Johann Beck (politician, born 1885) =

Liechtenstein politician (1885–1961)

Member of the Landtag of Liechtenstein for Oberland
- In office 29 April 1945 – 6 February 1949
- In office 3 February 1935 – 4 April 1939

Mayor of Triesenberg
- In office 1933–1951
- Preceded by: Heinrich Beck
- Succeeded by: Hans Gassner

Personal details
- Born: 6 February 1885 Triesenberg, Liechtenstein
- Died: 23 July 1961 (aged 76) Triesenberg, Liechtenstein
- Party: Progressive Citizens' Party
- Spouse: Viktoria Beck (m. 1910)
- Children: 10

Johann Beck (6 February 1885 – 23 July 1961) was a farmer and politician from Liechtenstein served in the Landtag of Liechtenstein from 1945 to 1949, having previously done so from 1935 to 1939. A member of the Progressive Citizens' Party (FBP), he was also the mayor of Triesenberg from 1933 to 1951.

== Life ==
Beck was born on 6 February 1885 in Triesenberg as the son of municipal councillor Valentin Beck and Katharina (née Gassner) as one of five children. He worked as a farmer and cattle dealer.

He was a member of the Triesenberg municipal council from 1924 to 1930 as a member of the Christian-Social People's Party (VP), and then mayor of the municipality from 1933 to 1951. During his time as mayor, he oversaw the expansion of the municipality's road networks and the construction of a new parish church, tunnel, and peace chapel in Malbun. He was a judge at the supreme court from 1922 to 1927.

By 1935, Beck had switched from the VP to the Progressive Citizens' Party (FBP), and the same year he was elected to the Landtag of Liechtenstein as a member of the party in a by-election held following the resignation of Wilhelm Beck, defeating Alois Schädler of the VP. He served in that position until 1939, and was again a member of the Landtag from 1945 to 1949.

Beck married Viktoria Beck (8 November 1882 – 9 February 1962) on 7 February 1910 and they had ten children together. He died on 23 July 1961, aged 76.

== Bibliography ==
- Vogt, Paul (1987). 125 Jahre Landtag (in German). Vaduz: Landtag of the Principality of Liechtenstein.
