= Bernhard Risch =

Liechtenstein politician and journalist (1879–1962)

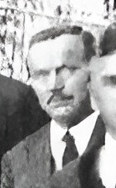
- Risch in 1931

Member of the Landtag of Liechtenstein for Oberland
- In office 7 May 1940 – 29 April 1945
- In office 16 March 1930 – 3 February 1936

Mayor of Vaduz
- In office 1933–1936
- Preceded by: Ludwig Ospelt
- Succeeded by: Ludwig Ospelt
- In office 1927–1930
- Preceded by: Josef Gassner
- Succeeded by: Ludwig Ospelt

Personal details
- Born: 29 July 1879 Vaduz, Liechtenstein
- Died: 26 December 1962 (aged 83) Vaduz, Liechtenstein
- Party: Progressive Citizens' Party

Bernhard Risch (29 July 1879 – 26 December 1962) was a politician from Liechtenstein who served in the Landtag of Liechtenstein from 1930 to 1936 and again from 1940 to 1945. A member of the Progressive Citizens' Party (FBP), he previously served as the mayor of Vaduz from 1927 to 1930 and again 1933 to 1936.

== Life ==
Risch was born on 29 July 1879 in Vaduz as the son of Johann Risch and Katharina Hartmann as one of eight children. He worked as a farmer on his family's farm, which he later took over. In addition, he founded a trading business for coal and wood. He was a board member of the Liechtenstein farmer's association.

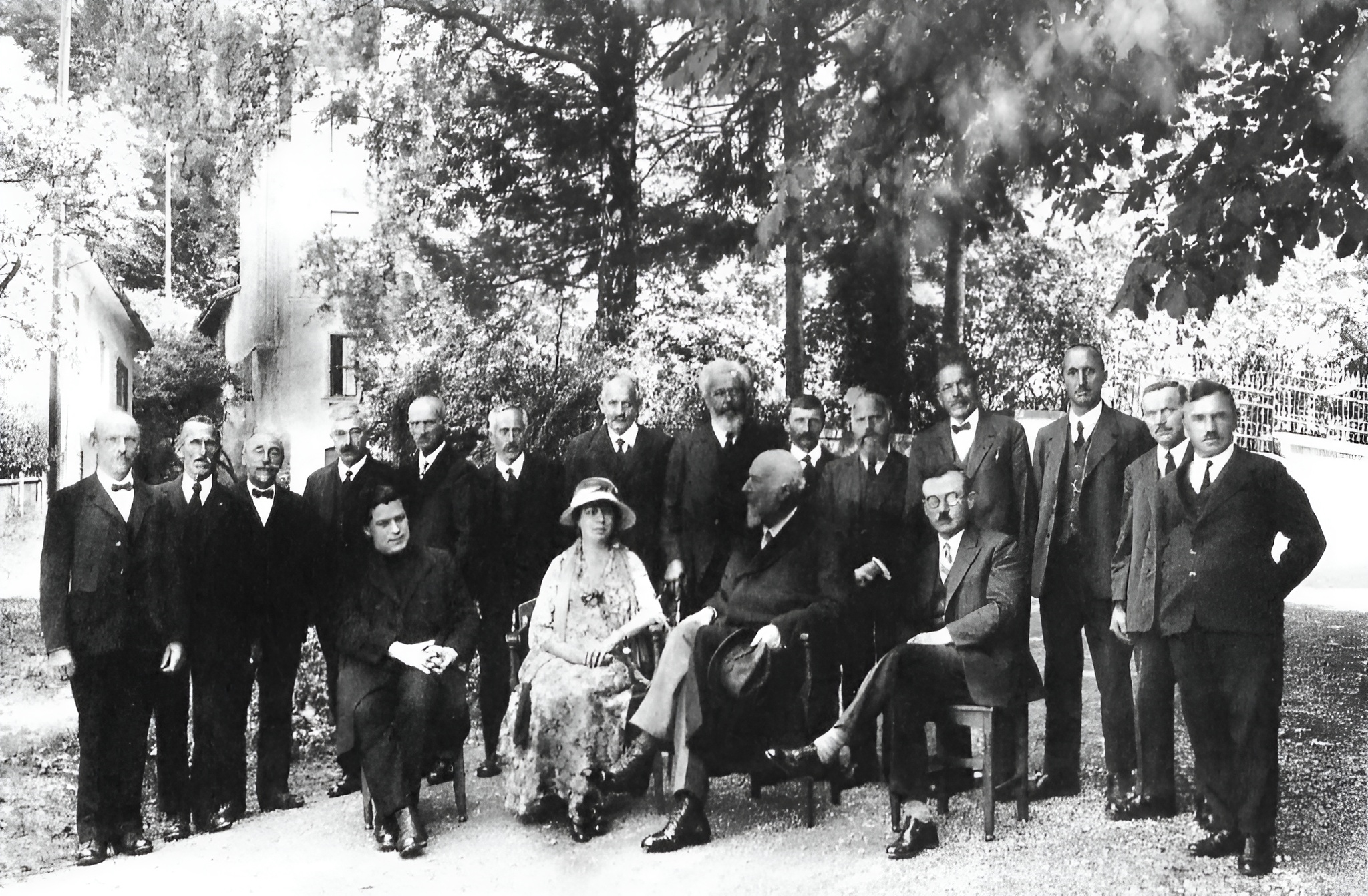
Risch (back, second from right) with members of the Landtag and Franz I in 1931

Risch was a founding member of the Progressive Citizens' Party (FBP) in 1918. From 1915 to 1921 and again from 1936 to 1945 he was a member of the Vaduz municipal council as a member of the Progressive Citizens' Party. From 1927 to 1930 and again to 1933 to 1936 he was the mayor of Vaduz. Risch was a member of the Landtag of Liechtenstein from 1930 to 1936.

In 1939 Risch was elected as a deputy member of the Landtag as a part of the unified list between the party and the Patriotic Union for the formation of a coalition government. On 7 May 1940 he succeeded Ferdinand Risch as a full member of the Landtag following his death the previous month, where he served until 1945. From 1922 to 1925, 1926 to 1927 and again from 1939 to 1945 he was the editor of the Liechtensteiner Volksblatt; during his time as editor, he opposed Nazi elements within Liechtenstein.

He served as the president of the Progressive Citizens' Party. From 1927 to 1929, from 1934 to 1935, and again from 1936 to 1948 he was the managing director of the Vaduz winegrower's association, and its chairman from 1941 to 1945 and again 1948 to 1958. He was an honorary member from 1958.

Risch died on 26 December 1962 in Vaduz, aged 83 years old.
