= Anton Frommelt =

Deputy Prime Minister of Liechtenstein from 1933 to 1938

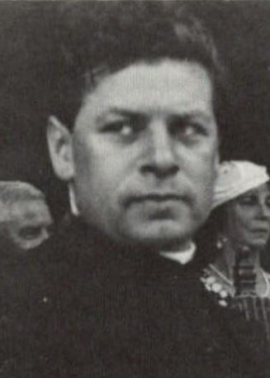
- Frommelt in 1938

Deputy Prime Minister of Liechtenstein
- In office 20 June 1933 – 30 March 1938
- Monarch: Franz I
- Prime Minister: Josef Hoop
- Preceded by: Ludwig Marxer
- Succeeded by: Alois Vogt

President of the Landtag of Liechtenstein
- In office January 1928 – December 1944
- Monarchs: Johann II; Franz I Franz Joseph II
- Vice President: Gustav Ospelt; Franz Josef Marxer; Josef Marxer; Otto Schaedler
- Preceded by: Wilhelm Beck
- Succeeded by: David Strub

Member of the Landtag of Liechtenstein for Oberland
- In office 15 July 1928 – 29 April 1945

Personal details
- Born: 14 March 1895 Schaan, Liechtenstein
- Died: 7 October 1975 (aged 80) Vaduz, Liechtenstein
- Party: Progressive Citizens' Party
- Relations: Alexander Frick (brother-in-law); Noldi Frommelt (nephew)

Anton Frommelt (14 March 1895 – 7 October 1975) was a pastor, politician and artist from Liechtenstein who served as the Deputy Prime Minister of Liechtenstein from 1933 to 1938. He was also President of the Landtag of Liechtenstein from 1928 to 1944 and as a member of the Landtag from 1928 to 1945.

Frommelt initially worked as a pastor before entering politics, where he was opposed to Nazi elements in Liechtenstein and played a key role in averting the 1939 Liechtenstein putsch. After leaving politics in 1945, he dedicated himself as an artist and photographer, where he gave advice on stamp policy and was recognised through exhibitions. In addition, he also contributed as a historian, focusing on archaeological excavations and monument preservation.

== Early life ==
Frommelt was born on 14 March 1895 in Schaan as the son of carpenter Lorenz Frommelt and Magdalena Vogt. He attended college in Stans and from 1920 he studied theology in Chur. He worked as an art teacher between 1920 and 1922. He was as a pastor in Triesen from 1922 until 1933.

== Political career ==
Frommelt was a member of the Landtag of Liechtenstein from 1928 and he served as the President of the Landtag of Liechtenstein from January 1928 to December 1944 as a member of the Progressive Citizens' Party. In 1933 he was appointed by Josef Hoop to serve as the deputy prime minister of Liechtenstein, succeeding Ludwig Marxer.

In 1930 he had supported the approval for the building of a 23km long inland canal to increase the percentage of arable land within the country and to create job opportunities within the country, which was approved in 1930, started construction in 1931 and then completed in 1943.

Following the Anschluss of Austria, under the initiative of Franz Joseph, the Progressive Citizens' Party and Patriotic Union started negotiations for the formation of a coalition government. This coalition was designed to avoid political deadlock while there was ongoing threat from Nazi Germany, and more importantly, prevent the German National Movement in Liechtenstein (VDBL) from gaining any seats within the Landtag. As a result of the coalition, Frommelt was succeeded as deputy prime minister by Alois Vogt of the Patriotic Union, but retained his position as president of the Landtag.

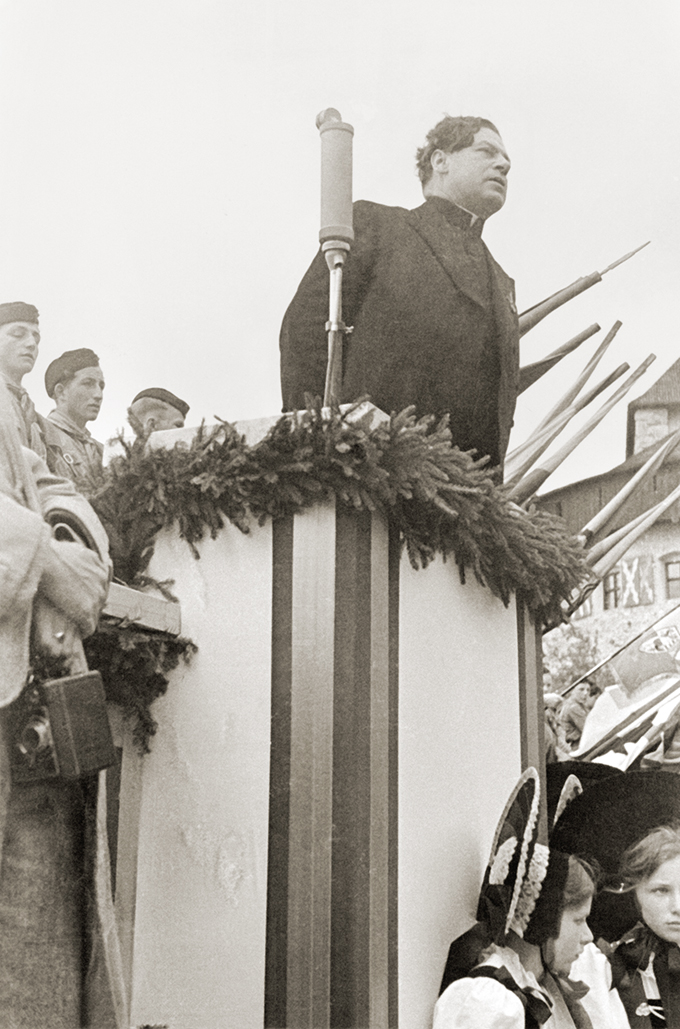
Frommelt giving a speech in homage to Franz Joseph II in 1939

He played a key role in thwarting the VDBL when they attempted a coup in 1939 by blocking their telephone lines and convincing marchers to stand down. He was a fierce opponent of National Socialism. Frommelt resigned all of his political positions in 1945, near the end of World War II.

== Historian and artistry ==
Due to health reasons, Frommelt decided to not become a pastor again but instead dedicated himself to becoming an artist and photographer. He published approximately 1,700 photographs throughout his lifetime. While he was no longer active in politics he still periodically gave advice to his friend Alexander Frick on stamp policy and created many designs of the stamps himself.

In 1965, to mark his 70th birthday, an exhibition was held in Vaduz dedicated to his photography, and again posthumously in Triesen in 1992. In addition to his artistry, he made several publications about his contemporary artists, such as Ferdinand Nigg, which is credited of granting widespread public acknowledgment of his works.

Frommelt was a member of the Historical Association for the Principality of Liechtenstein from 1930 to 1955. His area of focus was archaeological excavations and monument preservation. He played a role in the re-establishment of the Liechtenstein National Museum in 1954 and helped create the cultural history section of the museum.

== Death and family ==
Frommelt died on 7 October 1975, at the age of 80. He is buried at the cemetery in Vaduz. His nephew Noldi Frommelt also served in the Landtag. Through his brother's marriage, he became the brother-in-law of Alexander Frick.
