= Paul Vogt (historian) =

Liechtensteiner historian and politician (born 1952)

Member of the Landtag of Liechtenstein for Oberland
- In office 7 February 1993 – 8 February 2009

Personal details
- Born: 5 April 1952 (age 73) Balzers, Liechtenstein
- Party: Free List
- Spouse: Erika Hofer (m. 1988)
- Children: 2
- Occupation: Historian

Paul Vogt (born 5 April 1952) is a historian and politician from Liechtenstein who served in the Landtag of Liechtenstein from 1993 to 2009. As a historian, his works primarily include the political history of Liechtenstein.

== Life ==
Vogt was born on 5 April 1952 in Balzers as the son of Anton Vogt and Magdalena (née Wille) as one of seven children. He had a Matura in 1972 before studying history in Zürich and Berlin.

Since 1981, Vogt has worked in the Liechtenstein state archives, and has headed the office since 2002. He was a lecturer for history and political science in Vaduz from 1981 to 1993. Other roles have included member of the board for the Lake Constance History Association from 1980 to 1993, President of the Board of Trustees of the Liechtenstein State Museum from 1985 to 1994, and then board member from 1986 to 1995. He was also Vice President of the Liechtenstein Institute from 1993 to 1995. He has published numerous works on the history of Liechtenstein.

In the February 1993 Liechtenstein general election Vogt was elected to the Landtag of Liechtenstein as a member of the Free List, where he served until 2009. He was temporarily a member of the foreign policy commission, the state committee and the judge selection committee. Before the 2003 Liechtenstein constitutional referendum, Vogt was a notable opponent to the changes proposed whereby the Prince of Liechtenstein would be given wider powers, however it was accepted by the electorate.

On 19 November 2001, Vogt submitted a same-sex registered partnership initiative to the Landtag; though it was rejected in 2003, a civil partnership law was introduced to Liechtenstein in 2011.

Vogt married Erika Hofer on 4 February 1988 and they have two children.
