= Liechtenstein in World War II =

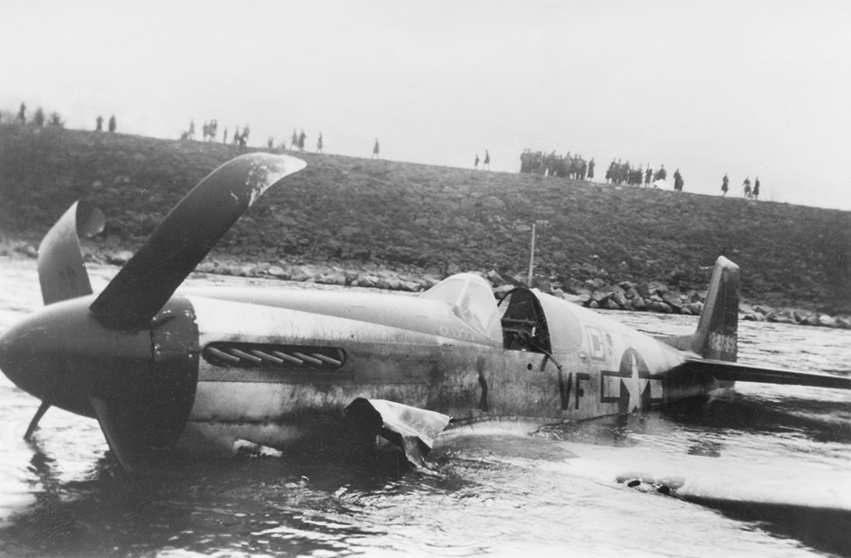
An American P51 Mustang, which had crash-landed in Schaan on 22 February 1945

Liechtenstein remained neutral throughout World War II, and its neutrality was not violated by any of its combatants. The country sought to align itself as closely as possible to Switzerland in hopes of retaining this neutrality, while also maintaining steady relations with Nazi Germany. German diaspora in Liechtenstein formed a local group of the Nazi Party/Foreign Organization. Additionally, Liechtenstein Nazis formed the German National Movement in Liechtenstein (VDBL), which sought the country's annexation into Germany.

== Background ==
Liechtenstein has maintained a policy of permanent neutrality since 1868, remaining neutral throughout World War I. However, until the end of the war, it was closely tied to Austria-Hungary due to the customs union that had existed between the two countries since 1852 and was sympathetic to the Central Powers. As the war dragged on, Liechtenstein faced economic devastation and food shortages as a result of the lack of natural resources, which increased smuggling into the country significantly and forced the country to reduce its reliance on Austria-Hungary and seek closer economic ties with Switzerland. By 1916 all food deliveries from Austria-Hungary had ceased, which forced Liechtenstein to seek closer ties with Switzerland in order to ensure food deliveries continued.

In 1919, following the dissolution of Austria-Hungary, the Liechtenstein government could no longer rely on Austria to fulfil their monetary and diplomatic needs. Liechtenstein and Switzerland signed a treaty under which Switzerland assumed the representation of Liechtenstein's interests at the diplomatic and consular level in countries where it maintains a representation and Liechtenstein does not. Liechtenstein adopted the Swiss franc in 1920 and the two countries entered a customs union in 1924. In 1921, a new constitution was introduced that established the rule of partial parliamentary democracy mixed with that of constitutional monarchy, much of which was loosely based on the Swiss Federal Constitution.

=== Pre-war challenges ===
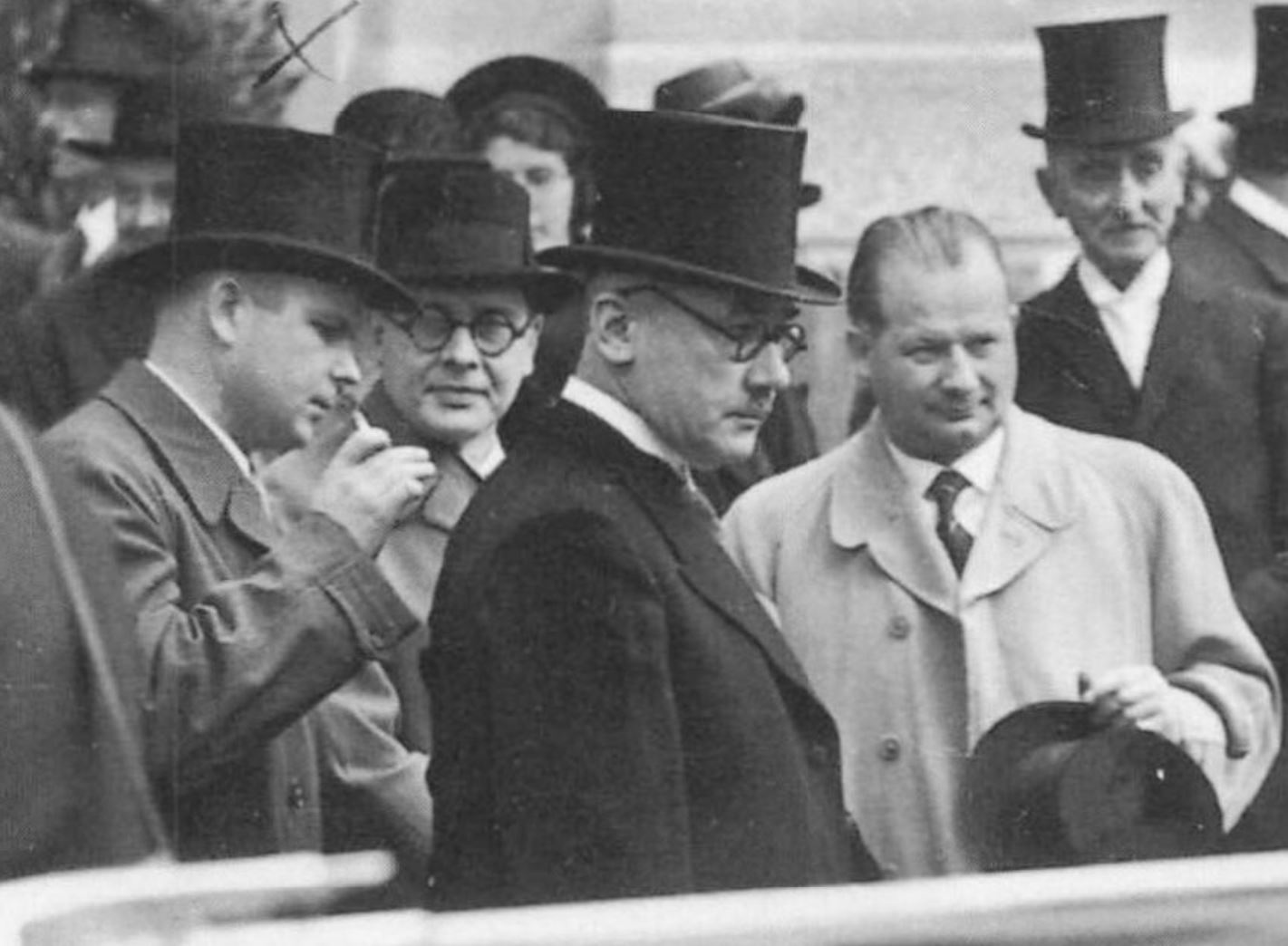
Four major political figures in Liechtenstein in 1938. From left; Alois Vogt, Otto Schaedler, Josef Hoop and Ludwig Marxer.

Like most other countries at the time, Liechtenstein was subject to a rise in unemployment, decline in agriculture and collapse in industry as a result of the Great Depression starting from 1929. Throughout the 1930s the country was dominated by the Progressive Citizens' Party (FBP), led by prime minister Josef Hoop, who had been in office since 1928. Starting from 1933, Liechtenstein was faced with external and internal challenges from Nazi elements, notably the Rotter kidnapping and 1937 Liechtenstein spy affair. It also saw the rise of authoritarian elements within the country, primarily the Liechtenstein Homeland Service, which moved towards that of Nazism shortly after its founding in 1933, and then merged with the Christian-Social People's Party in 1936 to form the Patriotic Union (VU). On 30 March 1938, in the wake of the Anschluss of Austria and under the initiative of Franz Joseph II, the FBP and opposition VU (led by Otto Schaedler) formed a coalition government. In the subsequent 1939 general election the two parties assigned a roughly equal number of seats in the Landtag.

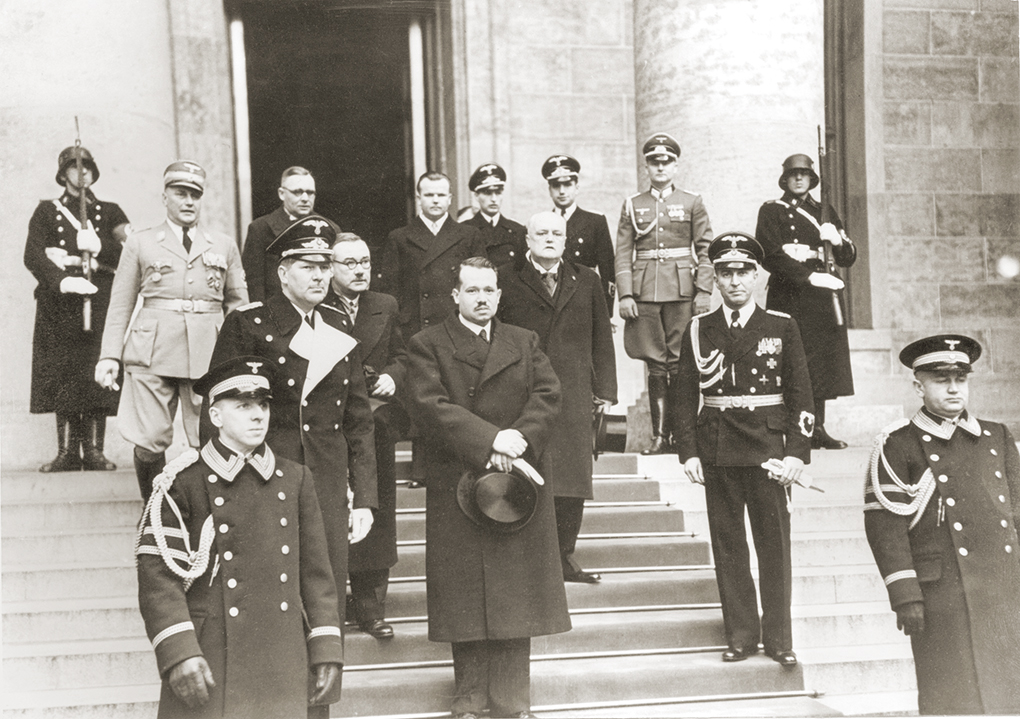
Franz Joseph II (centre) outside the Reich Chancellery in Berlin on 2 March 1939.

Around the same time as the coalition was made Nazi elements within Liechtenstein formed the German National Movement in Liechtenstein (VDBL), which sought Liechtenstein's annexation into Nazi Germany. Though there were plans for the Volksdeutsche Mittelstelle (an agency of the Nazi Party) to fund the party to be democratically elected to power in Liechtenstein with the goal of the eventual annexation of the country into Germany, they were blocked by Adolf Hitler personally due to his desire not to complicate relations with Switzerland. From 2 to 3 March 1939, Franz Josef, Hoop and Alois Vogt paid an official visit to Berlin where they met Hitler and Joachim von Ribbentrop, where they discussed safeguarding Liechtenstein's independence and neutrality while maintaining good relations. Hitler met Franz Joseph II and Hoop for a thirty-minute meeting, but no negotiations occurred. Franz Joseph II later reminisced on the visit and stated that Hitler showed little interest in them and that it only took place to "flatter Hitler's ego".

The country came under threat in the 1939 Liechtenstein putsch. The plan was for members of the VDBL to march on Vaduz and attempt to seize control of the government, which was hoped would cause clashes between them and the government. German troops from Feldkirch would then move into Liechtenstein in response to a call for help and incorporate the country into Germany. The plan failed however, as they were stopped by opponents, and most VDBL members were arrested or fled. No German invasion took place as it was blocked by Hitler's orders following intervention by Vogt. It is not exactly known why Hitler decided to not intervene in the coup, though it has been speculated that he had little interest in Liechtenstein, and that he did not want to provoke a war with Switzerland. The attempted coup led to the Liechtenstein Loyalty Association, a nonpartisan organisation designed to oppose the actions of the VDBL that was formed earlier in the year, to heighten its operations and launch a signature campaign reaffirming Liechtenstein's independence and loyalty to the prince, which gained 2492 signatures, representing 95% of the country's eligible voters.

== Course of the war ==
=== Foreign and domestic policy ===
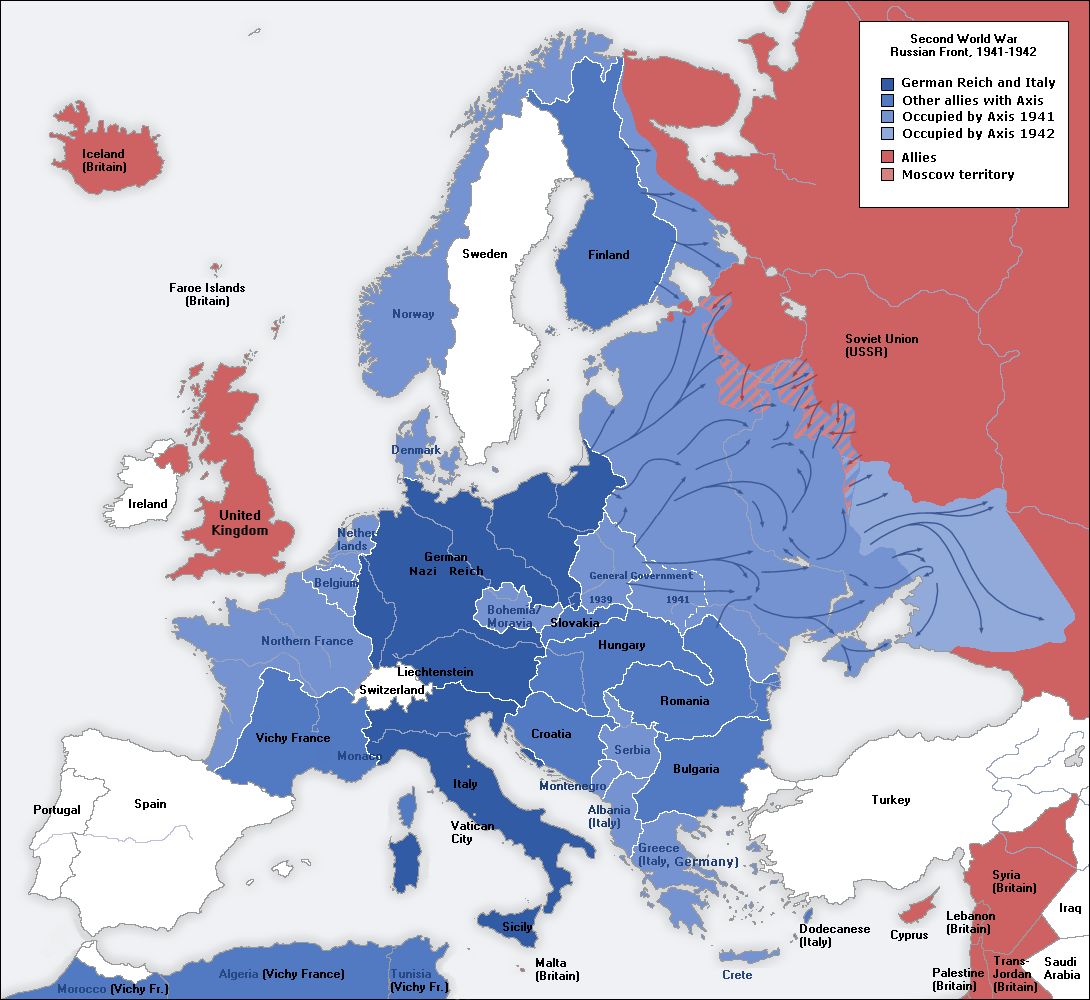
Liechtenstein, aside from Switzerland, was surrounded by territory controlled by the Axis powers from 1938 to 1945.

Liechtenstein declared its neutrality on 30 August 1939 via Swiss representatives. When the war broke out, Hoop's government was given extensive powers to manage the Liechtenstein economy during the war and it applied several Swiss war economy laws to Liechtenstein. By doing this, Liechtenstein achieved de facto inclusion in the Swiss national supply. However, Swiss distrust of Liechtenstein's official stance grew, primarily due to the actions of the VDBL, and demanded that Hoop's government publicly declared its allegiance to Switzerland, which it did on 5 November 1940. In exchange, Switzerland agreed to a new alien police agreement that allowed Liechtenstein workers to freely travel and work in Switzerland from 1941. Though Switzerland protected Liechtenstein's sovereignty throughout the war, Liechtenstein was not planned to be directly defended by Switzerland in the event of a German invasion.

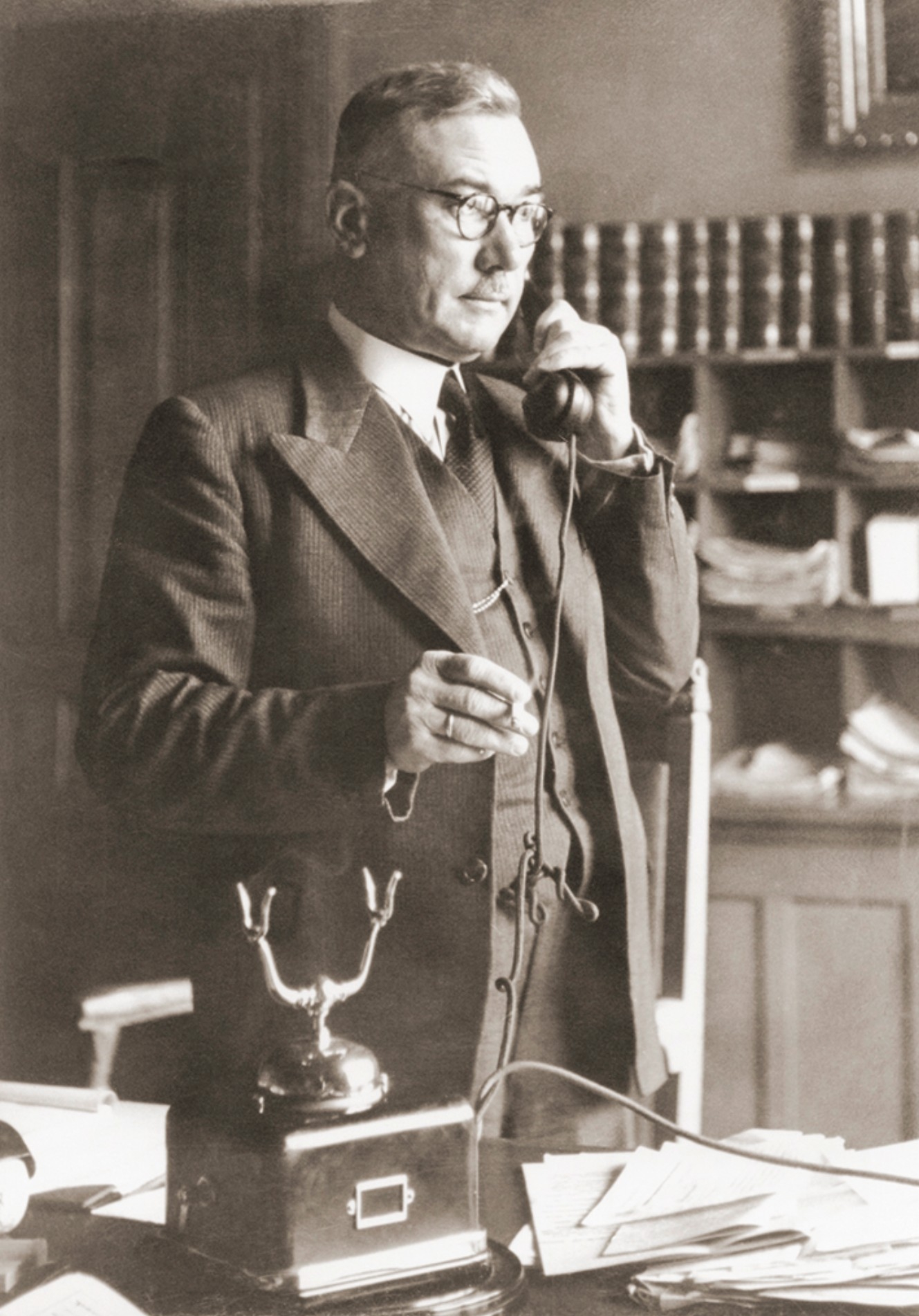
Josef Hoop was prime minister of Liechtenstein throughout World War II

Hoop's government considered friendly, non-binding, non-provocative diplomacy to be appropriate towards Nazi Germany, supplemented by courtesy gestures. In December 1940, during a lecture in Stuttgart, Hoop showed respect for the German armies. Nazi Party member Hermann E. Sieger (who had been Hoop's primary German contact since 1933) acted as an intermediate between Hoop and the German government while also supporting Hoop's efforts to retain Liechtenstein's independence. Franz Joseph II periodically sent congratulatory letters to Hitler, such as New Year's messages and for the thwarting of the 20 July plot, which he briefly replied. These letters were considered an indication of Hitler's recognition of Liechtenstein's sovereignty. However, Liechtenstein was intended to be invaded and annexed by Nazi Germany alongside Switzerland in Operation Tannenbaum.

Around 120 Jewish refugees lived in Liechtenstein during the war, primarily from Germany and Austria. Though they were largely welcomed by the population, they were forbidden from taking jobs considered competitive to the native population and were the source of hostility from Nazi elements in the country. Throughout the war, the Liechtenstein economy largely stayed afloat from labourers filling vacancies in the industries of Switzerland and Germany. In 1941, the companies of Hilti and ThyssenKrupp Presta were founded which produced materials for the German war industry and provided further employment to Liechtenstein throughout the war. Some Liechtenstein companies and individuals were placed on British and American blacklists and had their property confiscated due to their association with Nazi Germany.

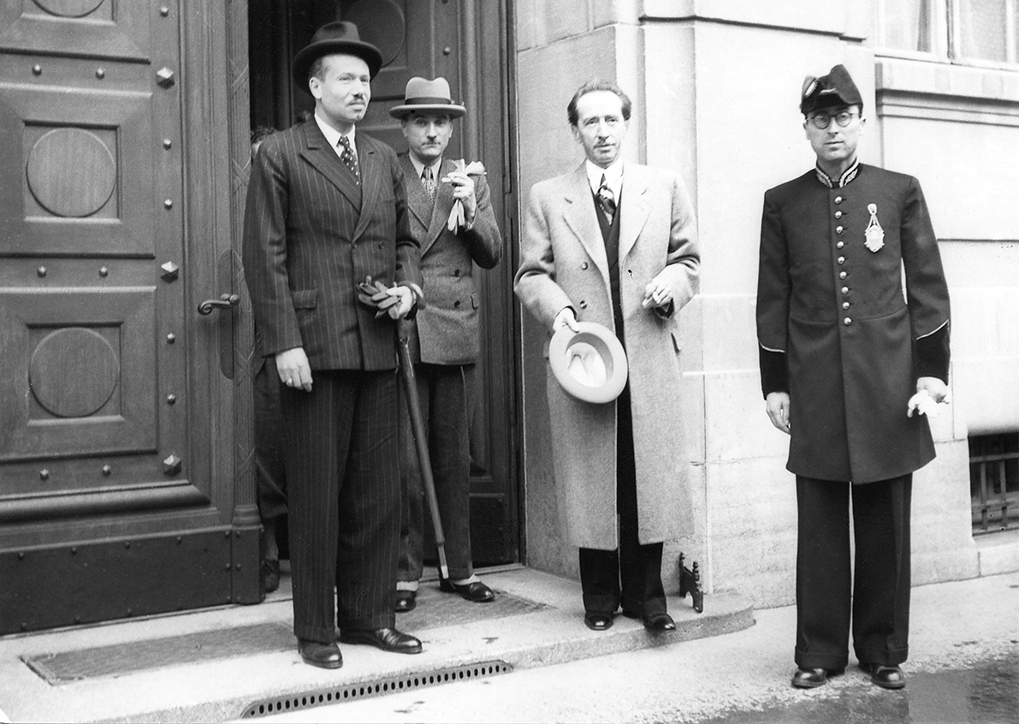
Franz Joseph II (left) with Marcel Pilet-Golaz and Enrico Celio outside of the Federal Palace of Switzerland in 1943

In November 1941 Franz Joseph II visited Victor Emmanuel III and Pope Pius XII and later made contact with diplomatic missions from the United Kingdom and United States. On 7 March 1943, at Vaduz Cathedral, Franz Joseph II married Countess Georgina of Wilczek. It was the first time that the wedding of a ruling prince had taken place in Liechtenstein, and served as a reinforced commitment to Liechtenstein's independence for the remainder of the war. In addition, Liechtenstein National Day was created as an annual holiday in 1940 to jointly celebrate the birthday of Franz Joseph II and Liechtenstein's continued independence. In 1944, Franz Joseph II, in agreement with Swiss federal councillor Marcel Pilet-Golaz, reopened the Liechtenstein embassy in Bern, which was previously closed in 1933. This was against the wishes of Hoop's government and the Landtag of Liechtenstein, which caused Franz Jopseh and Hoop's relationship to become strained.

Franz Joseph II bought various previously Jewish businesses during the war. Managers from properties belonging to the House of Liechtenstein in Austria used slave labour from the Strasshof concentration camp, though an investigation published in 2005 concluded that the prince had no knowledge of this. From 1944 to 1945, Franz Joseph II succeeded in having most of the House of Liechtenstein's private collections transferred from Austria and Czechoslovakia to Liechtenstein to save them from war damage. In February 1945, an American P51 Mustang crash-landed nearby to Schaan, which was promptly handed over to Switzerland.

In the closing weeks of the war, Liechtenstein experienced over 7,000 refugees into the country. The Liechtenstein Red Cross was founded on 30 April 1945 under the initiative of Gina, Princess of Liechtenstein, which provided soup kitchens and bathing services for the refugees near Schaanwald, while calling for the population of Liechtenstein to donate towards helping them. From 2 to 3 May 1945, the remainder of the pro-Axis and pro-imperialist Grand Duke Vladimir', First Russian National Army crossed into Liechtenstein, and were being cared for by the Liechtenstein Red Cross. On 16 August 1945, the Soviet Union sent a delegation to Liechtenstein to repatriate the Russians, which was refused despite increasing Soviet pressure to participate in the repatriation programme. Around two hundred of the soldiers agreed to return to the Soviet Union. Eventually the government of Argentina offered the Russians asylum, and about a hundred people left. According to prime minister Alexander Frick, with the support of Franz Joseph II, the Russians were at no point in danger of being extradited and the general population of Liechtenstein supported the government in providing asylum to them.

=== Nazi groups and collaboration ===
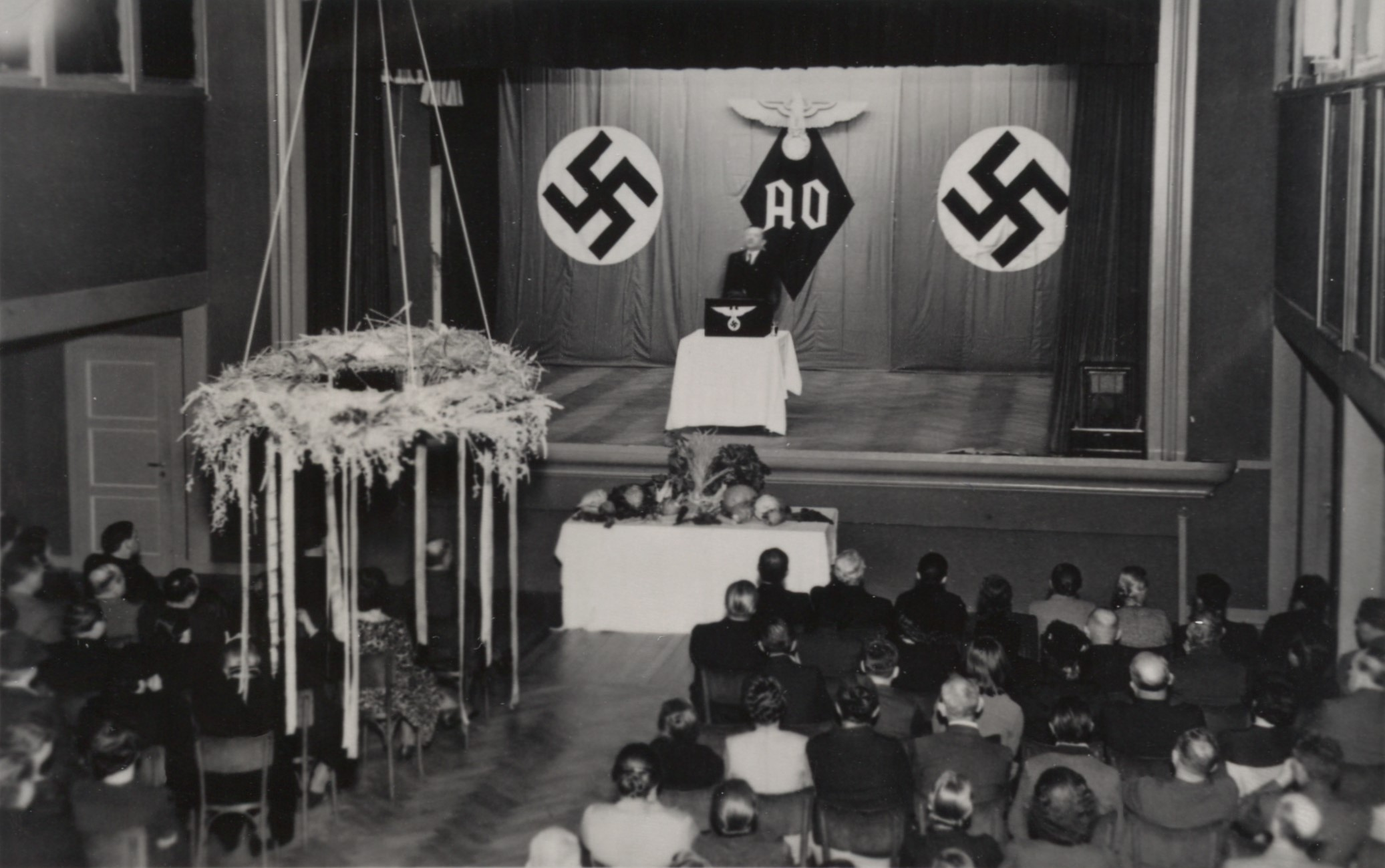
Meeting of the Liechtenstein branch of the Nazi Party in Vaduz town hall in October 1940

The Liechtenstein branch of the Nazi Party/Foreign Organization, which had been founded in 1933, reached a peak of 42 members in 1942. The organisation consisted primarily of German citizens living in Liechtenstein and officially stayed out of the country's politics during the war, but members also had unofficial connections to the VDBL. The organisation also formed a Liechtenstein branch of the Hitler Youth, which had approximately 70 members in 1941, around half of German children living in Liechtenstein. In 1941, the Liechtenstein government allowed for a Hitler youth camp in Steg. The Liechtenstein government considered banning the organisation, but decided against it in order to not have an illegal organisation instead. During the war, over 120 German citizens living in Liechtenstein were conscripted into the Wehrmacht.

The VDBL, which had been significantly weakened from the 1939 putsch, was reformed in 1940 under the leadership of Alfons Goop. The party continued to seek Liechtenstein's annexation into Nazi Germany and instigated political unrest such as fights, bombing attacks, and the burning of swastikas. The party also founded the newspaper Der Umbruch, edited by Martin Hilti, in October 1940 which propagated antisemitism and scorn towards the Allies and opponents to the VDBL, while also praising Nazi Germany and supporting its justifications for the war. As many as 100 people from Liechtenstein, mostly members of the VDBL, volunteered within Nazi Germany, and around 60 served in the Waffen-SS; notable members including Goop and Egon Marxer. Liechtenstein was also used as a means of spying on Switzerland due to the country laying nearby to Swiss fortifications in Sargans, and several Liechtensteiners were convicted of spying for Nazi Germany during the war, such as Alfred Quaderer, who was executed for treason against Switzerland in 1944.

The majority of the Liechtenstein population supported the country's continued independence. Hoop rejected the fascist tendencies of the VDBL, but took no direct action against it. Instead, the VDBL was forbidden from holding public meetings, flags and marches. On 8 July 1943, the government banned the publication of Der Umbruch, but it continued until February 1944. Other figures such as government councillor Anton Frommelt and head of the Scouts of Liechtenstein Alexander Frick took a direct stance against Nazi elements in Liechtenstein, which made Frommelt a focal point of hatred by the VDBL.

Despite the public and political attitudes in Liechtenstein, some politicians held pro-German sympathies; notably Vogt and Schaedler, former members of the Liechtenstein Homeland Service, who both maintained unofficial contacts with Nazi officials throughout the war, particularly the Volksdeutsche Mittelstelle, who regarded Vogt as a trusted contact. Between 1943 and 1944, Schaedler and former prime minister Gustav Schädler took over editorship of the Liechtensteiner Vaterland, and Schädler wrote a series of articles about Switzerland, supposedly for the German press, but in reality it was used by German intelligence agencies.

== Aftermath ==
Immediately following the war, in May 1945, Hoop permitted Sieger asylum in Liechtenstein. This caused Hoop's relationship with Franz Joseph II, which had strained following the reopening of the Liechtenstein embassy in Bern in 1944, to strain further. Hoop resigned as prime minister in September 1945, and was succeeded by Alexander Frick. The resignation came amidst pressure from Franz Joseph II to do so, as the prince believed that post-war Liechtenstein required a change in leadership; this de facto dismissal of Hoop angered many within the FBP. As prime minister, Frick continued the coalition government between the FBP and VU that had been established in 1938, and in 1946 at the request of Franz Joseph II it was declared binding. The coalition would last continuously until 1997.

Multiple figures in Liechtenstein were charged for their actions during the war. Most notably, in 1946, now former deputy prime minister Vogt came under police investigation in both Liechtenstein and Switzerland when German documents revealed his connection to intelligence contacts. The charges were eventually dropped due to the VU threatening to end the coalition government that had been established in 1938. The same year, Schädler was sentenced to 6 months in prison due to illegal intelligence providence, but did not serve the sentence due to health reasons.

The VDBL was formally banned on 8 May 1945, and the Liechtenstein branch of the NSDAP/FO the following day. Many former Liechtenstein Nazis claimed that they had been subject to Nazi propaganda and had not been aware of the crimes committed by Nazi Germany. Frick advocated for the social re-integration of former members of the VDBL. Ultimately, twelve participants in the 1939 putsch were put on trial, of which seven were convicted in 1946. Goop, who had spent several months in French captivity in 1945, took full responsibility for the VDBL's annexation policy into Germany and was sentenced to several years in prison in 1946. Up to 13 members of the Liechtenstein branch of the NSDAP/FO were deported by the government, including and its leader Friedrich Bock and photographer Adolf Buck.

== See also ==
- 1939 Liechtenstein putsch
- Switzerland in World War II
- History of Liechtenstein

== Bibliography ==
- Geiger, Peter (2007). Der Kleinstaat in der Ära der Weltkriege [The Small State in the Era of the World Wars] (PDF) (in German). Schaan: Liechtenstein Institute, Liechtensteinischen Akademischen Gesellschaft. Archived (PDF) from the original on 7 August 2026.
- Geiger, Peter (2000). Liechtenstein in den Dreissigerjahren 1928–1939 [Liechtenstein in the 1930s 1928–1939] (in German) (2nd ed.). Zürich: Liechtenstein Institute.
- Geiger, Peter (1999). Landesverrat. Der Fall des 1944 in der Schweiz hingerichteten Alfred Quaderer [High Treason. The Case of Alfred Quaderer, Executed in Switzerland in 1944] (in German) (98 ed.). Vaduz: Jahrbuch des Historischen Vereins für das Fürstentum Liechtenstein. Archived from the original on 13 July 2024.
- Tolstoy, Nikolai (1977). The Secret Betrayal. Charles Scribner's Sons. ISBN 0-684-15635-0.
- Brunhart, Arthur (1986). 50 Jahre für Liechtenstein [50 Years for Liechtenstein] (in German). Vaduz: Vaterländische Union – via Liechtenstein State Library.
