= 1937 Liechtenstein spy affair =

Political scandal in Liechtenstein

The 1937 Liechtenstein spy affair (German: Spitzelaffäre) was a scandal involving Carl Freiherr von Vogelsang, a founding member of the Patriotic Union and editor of the Liechtensteiner Vaterland, where it was revealed that he had sent numerous letters detailing Jews in Liechtenstein to Nazi Germany. The scandal caused prime minister Josef Hoop to order the offices of the Vaterland to be searched and for any papers to be confiscated. As a result, Vogelsang promptly left the country.

The scandal was controversial within Liechtenstein politics, and the Patriotic Union called for Hoop's resignation over the issue, claiming that his actions were against the constitution. Eventually the opinions of two legal scholars determined that Hoop had not acted against the constitution, and he was subsequently acquitted of all allegations.

== Background ==
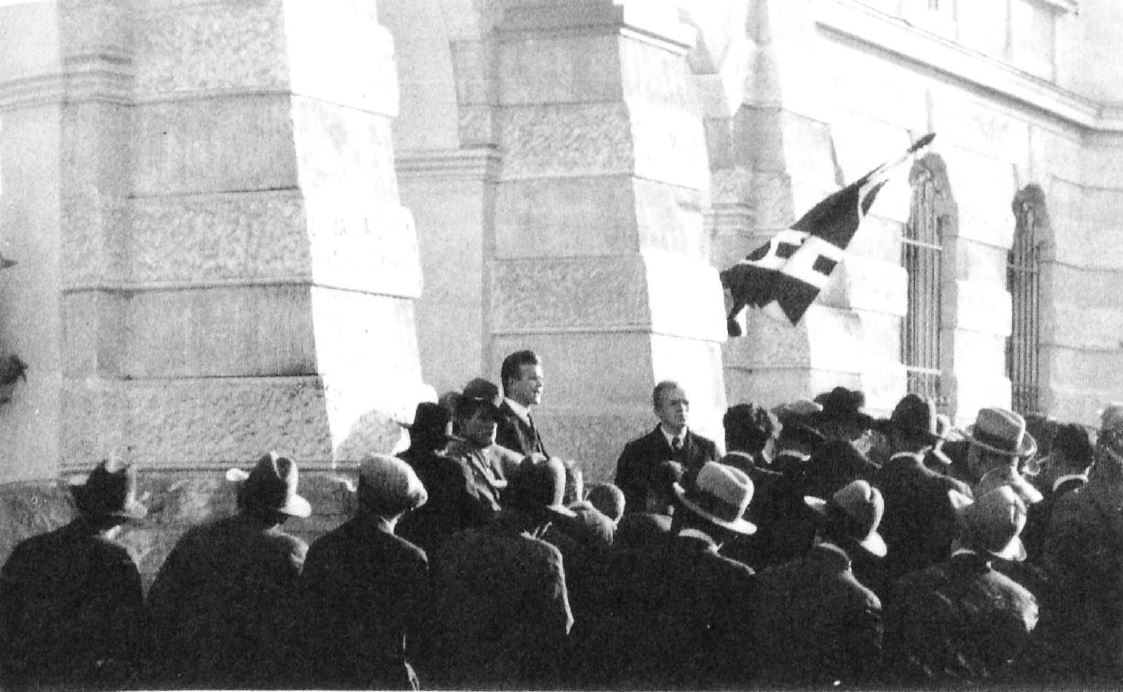
LHD rally on 9 December 1934. At the front, Alois Vogt and Carl Freiherr von Vogelsang can be seen on the right.

Carl Freiherr von Vogelsang was a founding member of the Liechtenstein Homeland Service (LHD) in 1933. This party quickly developed towards Nazism and ran an antisemitic campaign within Liechtenstein and advocated against the government's naturalization policies. In 1936, the party merged with the Christian-Social People's Party to form the Patriotic Union. As a result, the two parties' respective newspapers merged to form the Liechtensteiner Vaterland with Vogelsang as its editor.

Starting from 1934, Vogelsang sought to spread antisemitic and anti-Switzerland sentiment within Liechtenstein in hopes of aligning the country towards Nazi Germany. He was in active contact with the Verein für Deutsche Kulturbeziehungen im Ausland, where he gave reports regarding Liechtenstein's naturalization of Jews. Vogelsang hoped that should the Liechtenstein Homeland Service achieve power, that he would become Liechtenstein's envoy to Germany, and that he would be given a leadership position within the Hitler Youth. He, along with Alois Vogt and Rudolf Schädler, attended the 1934 Nuremberg rally as guests. Vogelsang had secretly been trying to become a member of the Nazi Party since 1932, and successfully did so in 1937.

== Affair ==
On 28 October 1934, Vogelsang sent a letter to Hermann Birkel, who worked in the motor transport authority in Friedrichshafen, which was intended for him to then forward to the police in the town. In the letter, he asked for the police in Friedrichshafen or the border guards in Lindau to arrest Ludwig Hasler, the head of the Liechtenstein tax office, claiming that his upcoming trip to Germany for a foreign exchange was a part of a conspiracy by German-Jewish emigrants. However, unbeknownst to Vogelsang, Birkel had left the job days prior and moved to Bludenz, where the letter was then forwarded to him, but he kept the letter instead of forwarding it as intended. In November 1936, Birkel was giving lectures in Liechtenstein schools about Vorarlberg when he gave the now two-year-old letter to prime minister Josef Hoop. Hoop thoroughly investigated the authenticity of the letter and prepared to order a house search, all of which he did in secrecy to avoid alerting Vogelsang.

On 23 January 1937 Hoop ordered the police to search both the offices of the Vaterland and Vogelsang's apartment in Triesenberg and for any papers to be confiscated. Hoop wanted to ensure that he had sufficient evidence to justify the search in minimize the reaction by the Patriotic Union. Upon learning of the imminent police search, party leaders Otto Schaedler, Alois Ritter and Alois Vogt unsuccessfully attempted to prevent the search from taking place. In response, the three men signed a protest letter to the government, threatening legal action against the government. According to Hoop, this threat prevented Vogelsang from being arrested on the same day.

For the Patriotic Union, the affair damaged the party's credibility, and it declared that Vogelsang's activities with Nazi Germany was his own doing and that the party had no knowledge of it. On the same day, it was decided that Vogelsang should leave the country for Germany, in order to avoid the risk of him being arrested and a subsequent trial that would further damage the reputation of the party and complicate relations with Switzerland and Nazi Germany. On 24 January Hoop sent a policeman to summon Vogelsang to be arrested the same day.

However, this did not happen, and in a coordinated effort by Otto Schaedler and Alois Vogt they got Vogelsang out of the country by car, where he went to St. Margrethen, and finally to Germany by train. Vogt informed Hoop that Vogelsang had already left the country and stated that he was under "personal protection" by the Patriotic Union, and that Vogt was his defending lawyer. He then subsequently settled in Kalkhorst.

== Aftermath ==
=== Calls for Hoop's resignation ===
In the days following the scandal, the Liechtensteiner Volksblatt published additional incriminating material against the former LHD. On 28 January 1937, the Patriotic Union formed a state committee. This committee declared its confidence in Schaedler and Vogt and then simultaneously condemned Vogelsang's spying and also the publications made by the Volksblatt, calling it "slanderous incitement" and claiming it damaged the reputation of the country.

The Patriotic Union sought to divert attention away from itself by distancing itself from the discussions in the Landtag of Liechtenstein regarding Vogelsang's actions, and instead criticised Hoop's procedure regarding the affair, which Schaedler considered to be unconstitutional. In a session of the Landtag on 12 February 1937, Hoop defended his actions and sought approval from the Landtag members, which 11 of the 15 members did so, with all of these 11 belonging to the Progressive Citizens' Party. The Patriotic Union used Hoop's actions as justification for mistrust in government. In March 1937, the Liechtensteiner Vaterland, now edited by Vogt, demanded that Hoop voluntarily resign as prime minister. The following month a delegation of the party officially demanded that Hoop resign, claiming that him acting alone and not informing the government beforehand was against the constitution and damaged the trust of the people in the government.

However, in response to this, 1867 signatures were collected supporting Hoop remaining as prime minister, representing approximately 73% of eligible voters at that time. The Liechtensteiner Volksblatt referred to the calls for his resignation as "absurd". In a session of the Landtag on 24 April 1937, Schaedler accused Hoop of creating false statements towards the Landtag. Hoop once again defended his actions, and all 11 members belonging to the Progressive Citizens' Party reaffirmed their confidence in him, and blocked any motion of no confidence against him. The Patriotic Union was criticised by several Landtag members for sedition. Ultimately it was agreed to obtain the opinion of two legal scholars whether Hoop acted within the constitution or not, which he himself proposed.

=== Legal opinions ===
On 27 February 1937 Walther Burckhardt, who worked as the University of Bern as a professor of international and constitutional law, presented an assessment regarding Hoop's actions regarding the scandal. He determined that Hoop had acted unconstitutionally by acting alone in ordering the police search and argued that he should have consulted the whole government and allow them to determine a course of action. However, Burckhardt also admitted that he found it difficult to assess the circumstances regarding it. The assessment was published in the Liechtensteiner Vaterland and was used by the Patriotic Union to justify calls for Hoop's resignation. However, it was criticised by the Liechtensteiner Volksblatt, who claimed that Burckhardt was given partial and incorrect information, and also highlighted his admittance of his difficulty to assess the circumstances.

Hans Nawiasky was one the legal scholars consulted by the Landtag to give an opinion on Hoop's actions. He published his report on 1 July 1937. He argued that according to the constitution the prime minister had broad powers to control the departmental competence within the country, and that it held the power to command the police alone as an administrative act, but that it was also their responsibility to be held accountable and seek approval for their actions. Therefore, Nawiasky argued that Hoop had not acted unconstitutionally by ordering the police search. Hans Steiner was the other legal scholar consulted by the Landtag. He also published his report on the same day as Nawiasky, and also argued that Hoop had not acted unconstitutionally. However, unlike Nawiasky, Steiner also argued that the state court of Liechtenstein could judge the actions of the prime minister in the event of a dispute in the Landtag, and they could hold the final say on the case. Following the publications by Nawiasky and Steiner, the Patriotic Union was forced to drop its calls for Hoop's resignation.

== Bibliography ==
- Geiger, Peter (1997a). Liechtenstein in den Dreissigerjahren 1928–1939 (in German) (1st ed.). Zürich: Liechtenstein Institute. ISBN 3-906393-28-3.
- Geiger, Peter (1997b). Liechtenstein in den Dreissigerjahren 1928–1939 (in German) (2nd ed.). Zürich: Liechtenstein Institute. ISBN 3-906393-28-3.
