= Quaderer =

Quaderer is a German-language surname. It was first mentioned in 1397. 68 people in Liechtenstein had the surname Quaderer in 1990. Notable people with the surname include:

- Johann Baptist Quaderer (1810–1875), Liechtenstein politician
- Rupert Quaderer (journalist) (1891–1975), Liechtenstein politician and journalist
- Alfred Quaderer (1920–1944), Liechtenstein collaborator with Nazi Germany executed by Switzerland
- Rupert Quaderer (born 1942), Liechtenstein historian
- Harry Quaderer (born 1959), Liechtenstein politician
- Alexander Quaderer (born 1971), Liechtenstein footballer
- Sascha Quaderer (born 1974), Liechtenstein politician

== See also ==
- Quaderer's Camp, the former name of Barron, Wisconsin, United States
