= Josef Hoop =

Prime Minister of Liechtenstein from 1928 to 1945

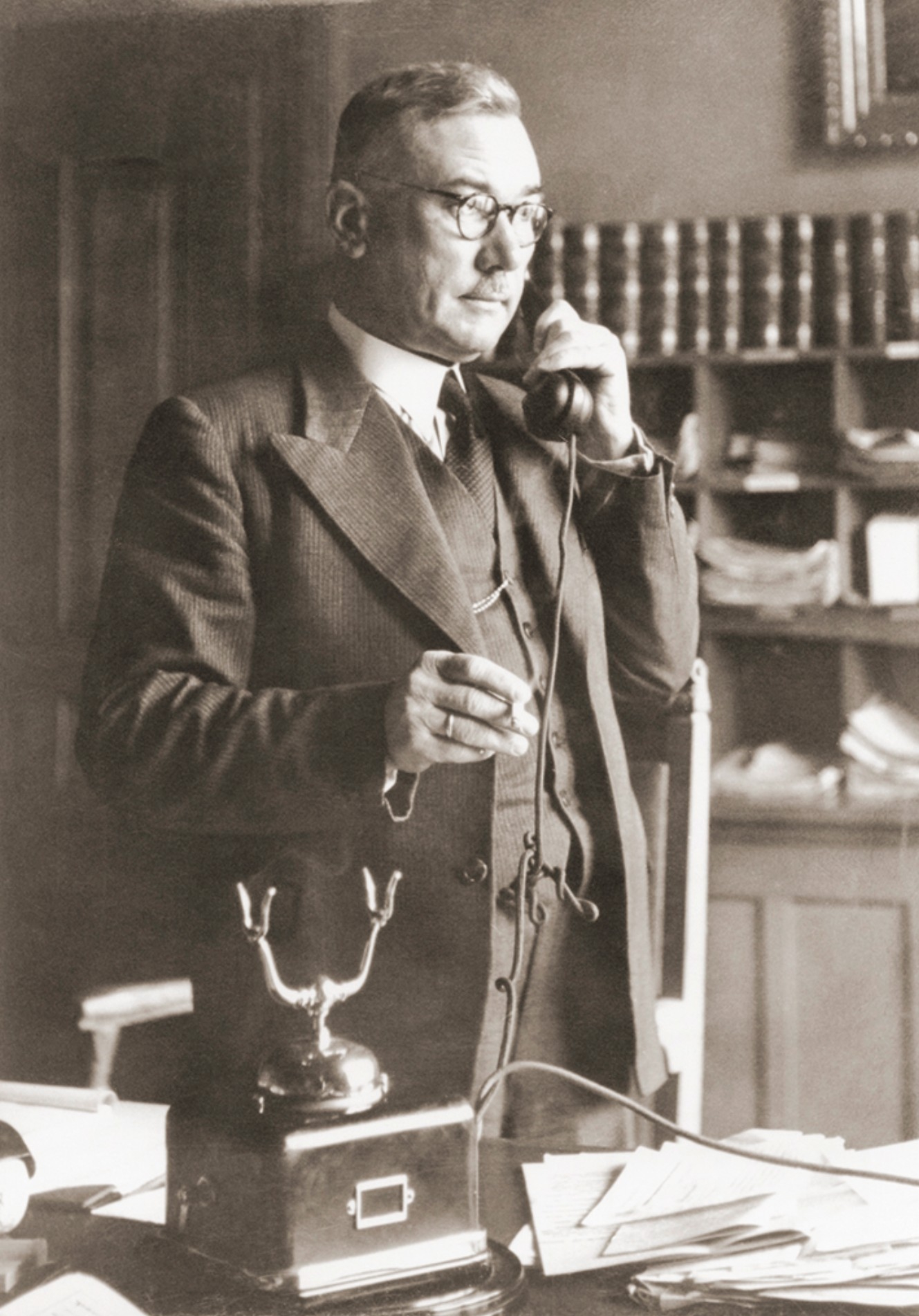
- Hoop in 1945

Prime Minister of Liechtenstein
- In office 4 August 1928 – 3 September 1945
- Monarchs: Johann II (1928–1929); Franz I (1929–1938); Franz Joseph II (1938–1945)
- Deputy: Ludwig Marxer (1928–1933); Anton Frommelt (1933–1938); Alois Vogt (1938–1945)
- Preceded by: Prince Alfred Roman of Liechtenstein (acting)
- Succeeded by: Alexander Frick

President of the Landtag of Liechtenstein
- In office January 1958 – 19 October 1959
- Monarch: Franz Joseph II
- Vice President: Alois Vogt
- Preceded by: David Strub
- Succeeded by: Martin Risch

Member of the Landtag of Liechtenstein for Oberland
- In office 1 September 1957 – 19 October 1959
- Succeeded by: Hans Gassner

Personal details
- Born: 14 December 1895 Eschen, Liechtenstein
- Died: 19 October 1959 (aged 63) Chur, Switzerland
- Spouse: Emilie Gstöhl (m. 1920)
- Relations: Eugen Schädler (brother-in-law); Emma Eigenmann-Schädler (niece)

Franz Josef Hoop (German: [ˈfʁants ˈjoːzɛf ˈhoːp]; 14 December 1895 – 19 October 1959) was a diplomat and politician who was Prime Minister of Liechtenstein from 1928 to 1945. A member of the Progressive Citizens' Party (FBP), he was the President of the Landtag of Liechtenstein from 1958 until his death the following year.

Hoop was the attaché and chargé d'affaires at the Liechtenstein legation in Vienna and in Swiss customs administration before his election as prime minister in the 1928 general election. During his first years in office, he oversaw Liechtenstein's response to the Great Depression with economic programs. Hoop's government began facing a number of domestic and foreign challenges in 1933, such as the Rotter kidnapping, the 1937 spy affair, and the 1939 putsch. In 1938, his government formed a coalition with the opposition Patriotic Union (VU). Hoop considered friendly, non-binding and non-provocative diplomacy, supplemented with courtesy gestures, appropriate towards Nazi Germany during World War II; he allied Liechtenstein as closely as possible with Switzerland, and maintained his country's neutrality throughout the war. He was pressured to resign by Franz Joseph II, Prince of Liechtenstein, in 1945.

After his resignation, Hoop studied law and began working as a lawyer in Vaduz in 1948. He returned to politics in 1957 when he was elected to the Landtag of Liechtenstein, of which he was president from 1958 to 1959. A smoker throughout his adult life, Hoop died of heart failure in 1959. His services to Liechtenstein, particularly during World War II, were widely recognized; Franz Joseph II said, in retrospect, that "Hoop saved the country".

== Early life and diplomatic career ==
Hoop was born in Eschen on 14 December 1895 to Franz Josef Hoop, a farmer and deputy member of the Landtag of Liechtenstein, and Berta (née Batliner); he was one of nine children. He attended high school in Feldkirch, Austria, and for a short time afterwards attended school in Zürich. Hoop then had his post-secondary education at the University of Innsbruck, where he studied Oriental languages and graduated in 1920 with a Doctor of Philosophy degree.

He was the attaché and chargé d'affaires at the Liechtenstein legation in Vienna, headed by Prince Eduard of Liechtenstein, from 1920 to 1923. Hoop worked towards removing visa requirements for Austrian citizens in Liechtenstein in 1922. He raised concerns about the low wages of the legation's staff, which he said were not enough to properly feed and clothe themselves. Hoop became a member of the Historical Association for the Principality of Liechtenstein in 1921.

Plans were made as early as 1920 to close the Liechtenstein legation in Vienna and have Switzerland represent Liechtenstein diplomatically, but the closure was repeatedly delayed by complaints. On 7 February 1923, Hoop wrote to the prince's cabinet that he had raised the issue with Austrian Minister of Foreign Affairs Alfred Grünberger; Grünberger reportedly saw no reason to close the legation, and Hoop said that he believed the closure would negatively affect relations with Austria. Prime Minister Gustav Schädler criticized Hoop for overstepping his position, pointing out that the Austrian government had already agreed to the closure of the legation; Hoop was unaware of the agreement, and the legation was closed later that year. After the closure, Hoop was unemployed for nearly a year. He worked for the Swiss customs administration in Geneva and St. Gallen from 1924 to 1928, and lived in the capital, Vaduz, after 1928.

== Prime Minister of Liechtenstein ==
Hoop was the third prime minister of Liechtenstein, from 4 August 1928 to 3 September 1945. As the result of an embezzlement scandal, Prince Johann II forced Gustav Schädler's government to resign in June 1928 and called for an early election. The 1928 election was won by the Progressive Citizens' Party (FBP). Acting prime minister Prince Alfred declined to remain in the position; Ludwig Marxer recommended Hoop because he had been largely uninvolved in political affairs, and the Landtag recommended Hoop's appointment.

=== Early tenure ===
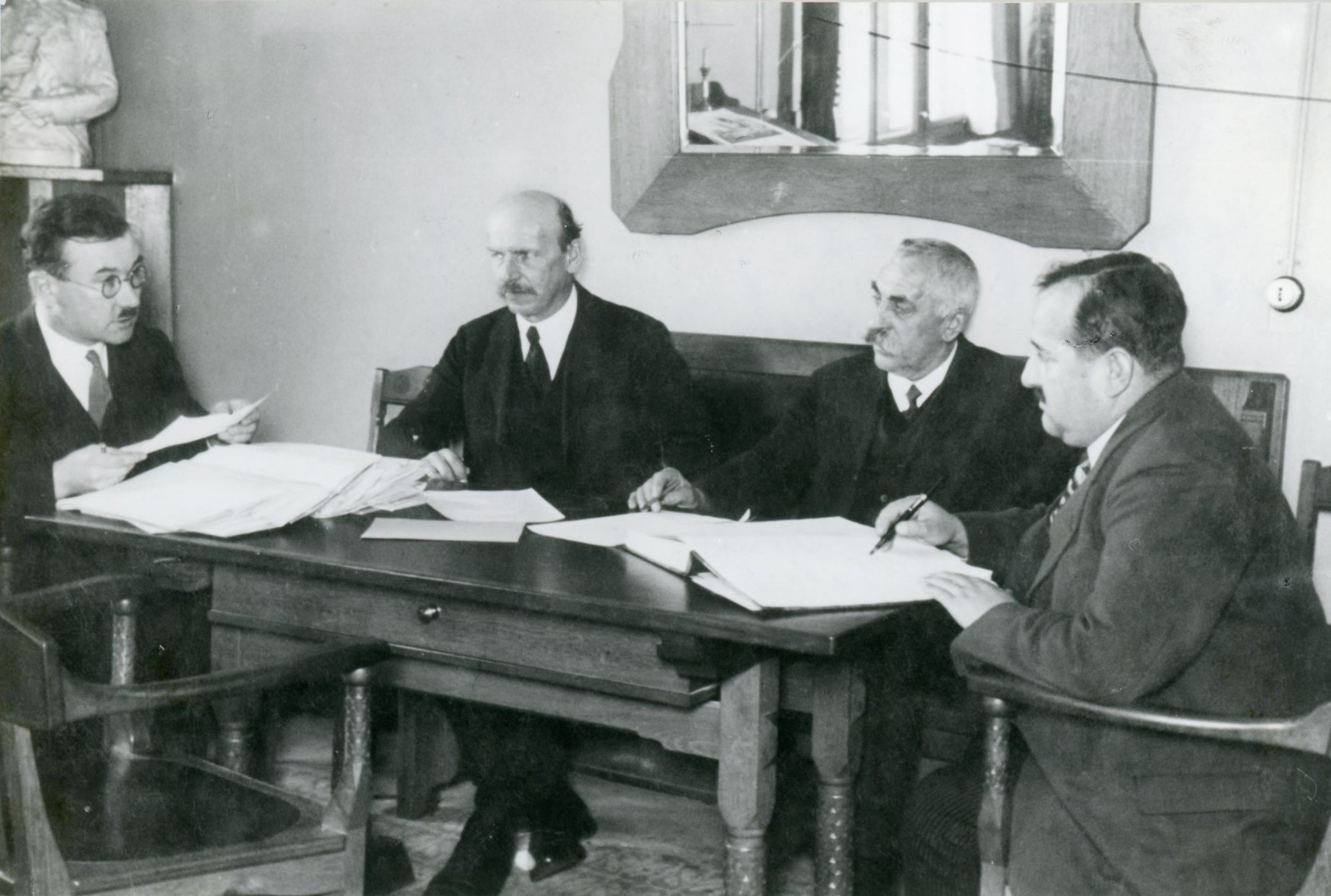
Hoop (left) with his government in 1928

Hoop's government was responsible for continuing economic recovery after the 1927 Rhine flood. In 1929, it was faced with the effects of the Great Depression: rising unemployment, a collapse in industry, and lower livestock sales due to deflation. The economic struggles of the Depression led to periodic worker demonstrations from 1931 to 1934, primarily organized by the Liechtenstein Workers' Association; the association convinced Hoop's government to initiate a number of public-works projects to create jobs.

To combat the Depression, Hoop encouraged new businesses, public works, and social protection policies. He campaigned for the construction of the Liechtenstein inland canal, which was intended to create construction jobs and increase the amount of arable land to the country. The canal was approved in 1930; construction began the following year, and was completed in 1943.

Prince Johann II died in 1929 and was succeeded by his brother, Franz I. Franz got along well with Hoop and frequently consulted with him; he approved of Hoop's efforts to increase employment, and gave the Landtag relative legislative freedom. After the 1930 by-election, the FBP became the first (and only) party to hold an absolute majority in the Landtag in its history; the majority held until the 1932 election.

=== Rotter kidnapping ===
After the rise of Nazi Germany in 1933, Liechtenstein received a large number of Jewish refugees. Hoop's government pioneered a financial naturalization method for Jews to obtain Liechtenstein citizenship. The 1931 naturalization of Alfred and Fritz Rotter, two Jews, led to a deterioration in relations between Liechtenstein and Germany. Liechtenstein was attacked by the German press, who falsely accused the Rotters of bankruptcy fraud and transferring their money abroad. Demands were made for the extradition of the men to Germany to face trial. Hoop tried to use private contacts to end the press attacks, considering an appeal to German president Otto Meissner.

Four Liechtensteiners sympathetic to Germany, acting on demands by the German press, tried to kidnap Fritz and Alfred Rotter and extradite them to Germany; they hired five Germans to help, and intended the kidnapping to coincide with the formation of a Nazi party in Liechtenstein. On 5 April 1933, they attempted to kidnap Alfred, Fritz, Alfred's wife Gertrud, and her cousin Julie. Their plan failed when the victims escaped on foot. While fleeing, Alfred and Gertrud fell down a steep hill and died. Fritz and Julie escaped, and Fritz contacted the police. All nine kidnappers were arrested shortly afterwards. Since Liechtenstein had only three police officers, the police enlisted several firefighters, the warden of the jail, and a letter carrier in their search efforts.

In response to the kidnapping, naturalization was discontinued until further notice; this was criticized by the Liechtensteiner Nachrichten. Hoop's government sent a diplomatic protest to Germany on 9 April 1933, urging both governments to work toward ending the press attacks. Switzerland represented Liechtenstein's interests abroad, opposing Liechtenstein's desire to discuss the issue with Germany independently and requesting a meeting of representatives of all three countries. A 6 October 1933 conference was held in Berlin with representatives of Germany and Switzerland, with Hoop representing Liechtenstein. At the conference, he defended the country against allegations by the German press; the Reich ministry demanded that Liechtenstein revise its naturalization policy, and Hoop obliged. The ministry also demanded the early release of two of the men imprisoned for the kidnapping, and the men were released the following month. In exchange for these concessions, Germany ended its press attacks.

=== Spy affair ===
In January 1937 it was learned that Carl Freiherr von Vogelsang, editor of the Liechtensteiner Vaterland and a founding member of the Liechtenstein Homeland Service, had sent a letter in 1934 asking police in Friedrichshafen or border guards in Lindau to arrest Liechtenstein tax office head Ludwig Hasler; his upcoming trip to Germany was reportedly part of a conspiracy by German-Jewish emigrants. Hoop ordered a search of the Vaterland offices for incriminating letters, and Vogelsang left the country. Most of the Landtag approved of Hoop's actions but members of the Patriotic Union (VU) called for his resignation, believing that the search was unconstitutional. It was decided that two special judges would determine the legal implications of the case. In July 1937, both judges concluded that Hoop had not acted unconstitutionally by ordering the search.

=== 1938–1939 crisis ===
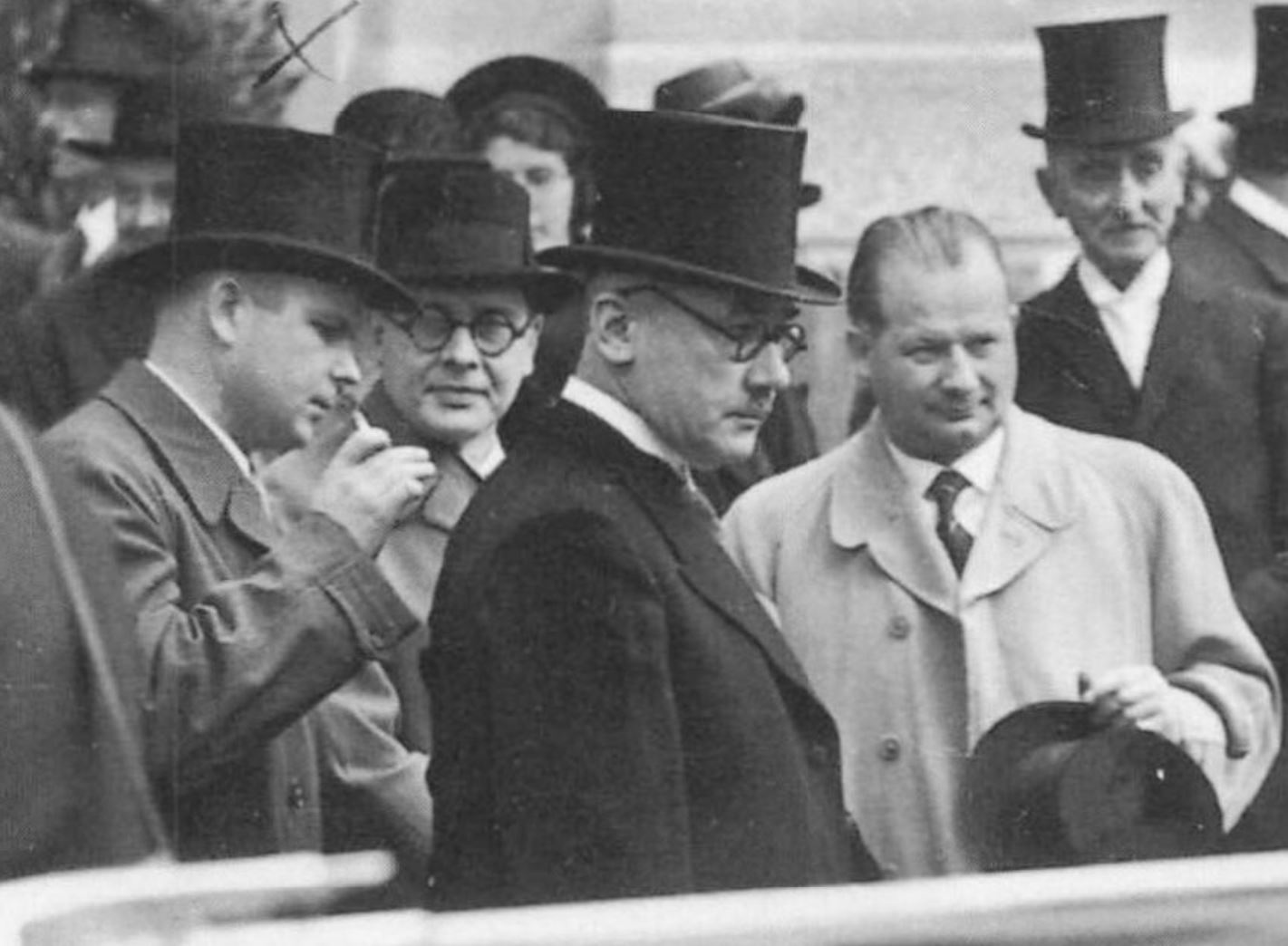
Hoop (centre-right) with Alois Vogt, Otto Schaedler, and Ludwig Marxer c. 1938

Hoop was in Vienna during the Anschluss on 12 March 1938, and returned to Liechtenstein on 14 March. His immediate concern was the potential annexation of Liechtenstein by Germany, and he sought reassurance from Nazi officials that Liechtenstein would remain independent. On 18 March, Adolf Hitler blocked interference in Liechtenstein because he did not want to complicate relations with Switzerland.

That month, at the initiative of heir presumptive Franz Joseph, the FBP and VU began negotiations to form a coalition government. Hoop agreed to allow the VU to enter the government and to introduce proportional representation in Liechtenstein, despite its rejection by referendum three years earlier; the coalition became effective on 30 March 1938. His second cabinet was succeeded by a third, with members of both parties. Hoop's deputy prime minister, FBP member Anton Frommelt, was succeeded by Alois Vogt of the VU.

The day after the coalition became effective, Franz I made Franz Joseph his regent and moved to a family estate in Feldsberg (now Valtice), Czechoslovakia; he died there on 25 July. Franz Joseph succeeded him as Franz Joseph II. Although Franz I said that he gave the regency to Franz Joseph due to old age, it was speculated that he did not want to remain in control of the principality if Germany invaded; his wife, Elsa, was Jewish. As a reaction to the coalition government, Liechtenstein Nazis formed the German National Movement in Liechtenstein (VDBL) in 1938.

That year, Hoop was pressured to transfer the Ellhorn to Switzerland. He favored the transfer, saying that Liechtenstein should be fairly compensated for its loss of territory with the transfer of Swiss land elsewhere or greater banking cooperation between the countries. The proposition faced resistance from the residents in Balzers, and was not approved by Franz Joseph II. Also facing unofficial objection from Germany, Hoop ended negotiations with Switzerland.

=== Relations with Germany and 1939 putsch ===
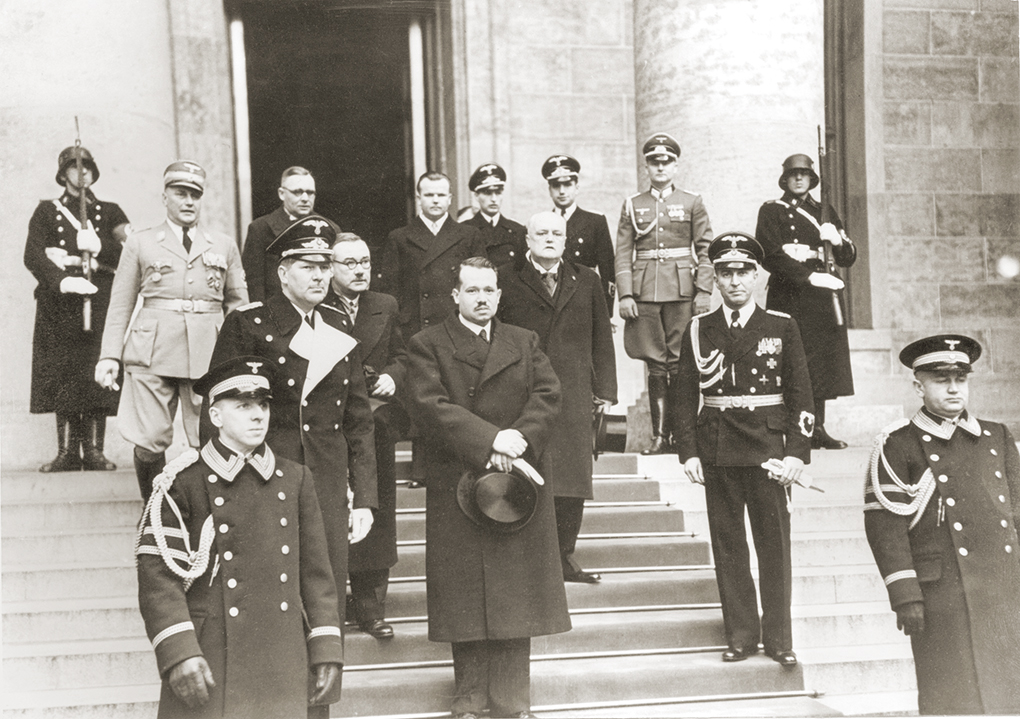
Hoop (behind Franz Joseph II) outside the Reich Chancellery in Berlin on 2 March 1939

Franz Josef II, Hoop, and Vogt made a 2–3 March 1939 courtesy visit to Berlin, where they met Adolf Hitler and Joachim von Ribbentrop. Hitler met Franz Joseph II and Hoop for thirty minutes and discussed safeguarding Liechtenstein's independence and neutrality while maintaining good relations, but no negotiations took place. Franz Joseph II later reminisced about the visit, saying that Hitler had little interest in them and it only took place to "flatter Hitler's ego".

An attempted putsch took place on 24 March 1939. The VDBL planned to march on the capital, Vaduz, which they hoped would trigger clashes between them and the government; German troops from Feldkirch would move into Liechtenstein in response to a call for help, and incorporate the country into Germany. The plan failed when the VDBL was stopped by opponents outside Schaan, and a German invasion was blocked by Vogt, Meissner, and Heinrich Georg Stahmer; Stahmer had advised Hitler and von Ribbentrop against invading Liechtenstein.

On the day of the attempted coup, Hoop called Berlin from Lugano and was assured that orders forbade a German invasion of Liechtenstein. Hoop then reported to Hermann E. Sieger (his primary German contact since 1933) that the attempted coup had been conducted by a small extremist group, that Liechtenstein wished to remain in a customs union with Switzerland, and Hoop's government wanted to preserve diplomatic relations with Germany; Sieger forwarded Hoop's report to the Foreign Office. Hoop met on 27 March with local authorities in Feldkirch, who denied any involvement in the attempted coup.

Sieger, who had long urged Hoop to consider a customs union with Germany, renewed his efforts after the attempted coup; Hoop rejected this, saying that the vast majority of Liechtensteiners would not be willing to give up the customs union with Switzerland. Despite Hoop's objections, Sieger reported to the Foreign Office that public opinion in Liechtenstein was shifting toward economic integration with Germany and Hoop should be pressured "personally and privately" to move toward it. The office rejected the idea, however, and ordered Sieger not to take any more steps toward it.

=== World War II ===
Hoop considered friendly, non-binding, non-provocative diplomacy, combined with courteous gestures, appropriate towards Germany during World War II. In a 1940 lecture in Stuttgart, he expressed respect for the German army. Hoop rejected the VDBL's fascist tendencies, but did not take direct action against the party. Its actions were restricted, however; the VDBL was forbidden from holding public meetings, flying flags, and marching. Despite this, the VDBL instigated political unrest such as fights, bombing attacks, and burning of swastikas. The Liechtenstein Loyalty Association had been founded in 1939 to oppose the VDBL and maintain Liechtenstein's independence. Hoop tried to temper relations between the groups and prevent tensions from escalating into violence.

He allied the country as closely as possible with Switzerland in the hope of retaining Liechtenstein's neutrality. At the start of the war, Hoop's government was given extensive power to manage the economy and applied several Swiss war economy laws to Liechtenstein; he included the country de facto in the Swiss national supply. Swiss distrust of Liechtenstein's official stance grew (primarily due to the VDBL), and the Swiss government demanded that Hoop's government declare allegiance to Switzerland; it did so on 5 November 1940. In exchange, Switzerland agreed to allow Liechtenstein workers to travel and work freely in Switzerland. Hoop had worked closely with Franz Joseph II, but their relationship became strained when Franz Joseph II reopened the embassy in Bern in 1944 against the wishes of Hoop's government and the Landtag, and Hoop granted Hermann E. Sieger asylum in Liechtenstein in May 1945.

=== Resignation ===
In September 1945, after serving as prime minister for seventeen years, Hoop resigned due to his worsening heart condition and his desire to leave the role. He said that Franz Joseph II had pressured him to do so because the prince believed that post-war Liechtenstein required a change in leadership. This stemmed from a diplomatic crisis involving the pro-Axis First Russian National Army, led by General Boris Smyslovsky, which had taken refuge in Liechtenstein a few months earlier. The de facto dismissal of Hoop angered many in the FBP. He was succeeded by Alexander Frick.

== Later life ==
In 1946, Hoop testified against the VDBL leaders when they were charged for the 1939 attempted coup. He studied law at the University of Zurich and the University of Innsbruck (where he received a doctoral degree in 1948), and worked as a lawyer in Vaduz.

Hoop was later a board member of the National Bank of Liechtenstein and president of the Liechtenstein Constitutional Court. He re-entered politics when he was elected to the Landtag in the 1957 general election, and was president of that body from January 1958 until his death the following year.

== Personal life and death ==
Hoop married Emilie Gstöhl (27 February 1898 – 11 February 1997) in 1920; they had no children. Through his sister's marriage, he was the brother-in-law of Eugen Schädler. Hoop's niece Emma Eigenmann-Schädler was the first female member of the Landtag, serving from 1986 to 1993.

Hoop, a likfelong smoker, died on 19 October 1959 at age 63 from heart failure after surgery. He was buried in his hometown of Eschen, and his funeral was attended by Franz Joseph II and Princess Gina. A street in Eschen is named after him.

He was well-regarded by Franz Joseph II for his efforts to protect Liechtenstein's independence during World War II, and Franz said that "Hoop saved the country". Martin Risch, a member of the Liechtenstein Historical Association and Hoop's successor as Landtag president, described him as "universally trusted" and his achievements as "undoubtedly of fundamental importance".

=== In popular culture ===
Hoop was played by French actor Pierre Vaneck in the 1993 film, Vent d'est.

== Honours ==
- Grand Cross of the Order of Merit of the Principality of Liechtenstein (1937)

== See also ==
- Electoral history of Josef Hoop
- First Josef Hoop cabinet
- Fourth Josef Hoop cabinet
- History of Liechtenstein
- Politics of Liechtenstein

== Bibliography ==
- Nohlen, Dieter; Stöver, Philip (2010). Elections in Europe: A data handbook. Nomos. ISBN 978-3-8329-5609-7.
- Vogt, Paul (1987). 125 Jahre Landtag (in German). Vaduz: Landtag of the Principality of Liechtenstein.
- Geiger, Peter (1997a). Liechtenstein in den Dreissigerjahren 1928–1939 [Liechtenstein in the 1930s 1928–1939] (in German). Vol. 1. Zürich: Liechtenstein Institute. ISBN 3-906393-28-3.
- Geiger, Peter (1997b). Liechtenstein in den Dreissigerjahren 1928–1939 [Liechtenstein in the 1930s 1928–1939] (in German). Vol. 2. Zürich: Liechtenstein Institute. ISBN 3-906393-28-3.
- Kamber, Peter (2020). Fritz und Alfred Rotter: Ein Leben zwischen Theaterglanz und Tod im Exil [Fritz and Alfred Rotter: A life between theatrical splendour and death in exile] (in German). Leipzig: Henschel Verlag. ISBN 978-3894878122.
- Geiger, Peter (2007). Der Kleinstaat in der Ära der Weltkriege [The small state in the era of the world wars] (PDF) (in German). Schaan: Liechtenstein Institute, Liechtensteinischen Akademischen Gesellschaft.
- Tolstoy, Nikolai (1977). The Secret Betrayal. Charles Scribner's Sons. ISBN 0-684-15635-0.
- Risch, Martin (1959). Dr. Josef Hoop (in German). Vol. 59. Jahrbuch des Historischen Vereins für das Fürstentum Liechtenstein.
