= Susanne Eberle-Strub =

Liechtensteiner politician (born 1960)

Member of the Landtag
- In office 2017–2021

Personal details
- Born: Susanne Strub; 10 June 1960 (age 65) Grabs, Switzerland
- Political party: Progressive Citizens' Party

Susanne Eberle-Strub (born 10 June 1960) is a Liechtensteiner politician who is a former member of the Landtag of Liechtenstein from 2017 to 2021.

== Biography ==
Susanne Strub was born in Grabs, Switzerland on 10 June 1960. She grew up in Vaduz and went to school there. She later worked as a medical practice assistant until the birth of her children.

She came from a family close to the Progressive Citizens' Party, which had already produced a number of politicians, such as her paternal grandfather's brother, David Strub, her maternal grandfather Eugen Schädler, and her maternal aunt Emma Eigenmann.

In 2003, Eberle-Strub was elected to the municipal council of Vaduz for the Progressive Citizens' Party for the first time. She wes reelected in 2007 and 2011 respectively. In the municipal elections of 2015, she decided not to run again for a seat on the municipal council.

During her time as a municipal councilor, Eberle-Strub served, among other things, as municipal school council president, from 2011 to 2015 as vice mayor, and as a member of various commissions. She was also a member of the Congress of Local and Regional Authorities of the Council of Europe for four years. In the state elections in Liechtenstein in 2017, she was elected to the state parliament of the Principality of Liechtenstein for the Progressive Citizens' Party. As an MP, she was a member and chairwoman of the Liechtenstein delegation to the Parliamentary Assembly of the Council of Europe. She did not stand in the next state election in February 2021 and thus left the state parliament.

== Family ==
Eberle-Strub is married and has two sons. She is the grand-niece of David Strub, former President of the Landtag of Liechtenstein.
