= Emma Eigenmann-Schädler =

Liechtensteiner politician and businesswoman (born 1930)

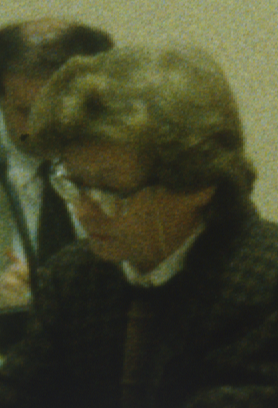
- Eigenmann-Schädler in 1991

Member of the Landtag
- In office 1986–1993
- Constituency: Unterland

Personal details
- Born: 30 October 1930 (age 95) Nendeln, Liechtenstein
- Party: Progressive Citizens' Party
- Parent(s): Eugen Schädler; Elwina Katharina Hoop

Emma Eigenmann-Schädler (née Schädler; born 30 October 1930) is a Liechtensteiner former politician and businesswoman. In 1986 she was the first woman elected to be elected to the Landtag, remaining a member until 1993.

== Biography ==
Eigenmann was born Emma Schädler in Nendeln in 1930, the daughter of Elwina Katharina Hoop and Eugen Schädler. Her family was involved in politics, with both her father and her uncle Josef Hoop serving as members of the Landtag. She was educated at the St Elisabeth Institute in Schaan between 1943 and 1946 and then the Salve Regina Institute in Fribourg in Switzerland from 1946 to 1947. Between 1947 and 1950 she did an apprenticeship in ceramic painting, before studying at the ceramics school in Höhr-Grenzhausen in Germany.

Returning to Liechtenstein, she joined the family ceramics company Schaedler Keramik AG. In August 1953 she married August Eigenmann (1922–1967), with whom she had two children. She became head of the family firm in 1973, a role she kept until 1995, and was a board member of the Liechtenstein Chamber of Commerce and Industry from 1979 to 1995.

Women were not granted the right to vote in Liechtenstein until a 1984 referendum. Eigenmann stood as a Progressive Citizens' Party candidate in Unterland in the next general elections in 1986 and was the first woman elected to the Landtag. She was re-elected in 1989 but chose not to run in the February 1993 elections. She was subsequently awarded the Order of Merit.

Eigenmann's niece Susanne Eberle-Strub later also served in the Landtag.
