= Electoral history of Josef Hoop =

List of elections featuring Josef Hoop as a candidate

This a summary of the electoral history of Josef Hoop, the Prime Minister of Liechtenstein from 1928 to 1945, and then a member of the Landtag of Liechtenstein for the Oberland electoral district from 1957 to 1959.

== General elections ==
=== 1928 Liechtenstein general election ===
Candidate	Party	First round			Second round			Total seats	+/–
Candidate	Party	Votes	%	Seats	Votes	%	Seats	Total seats	+/–
Josef Hoop	Progressive Citizens' Party			11			0	11	▲5
Gustav Schädler	Christian-Social People's Party			3			1	4	▼5
Total				14			1	15	0
Total votes		2,101	–						
Registered voters/turnout		2,257	93.09						
Source: Nohlen & Stöver, Vogt

=== 1930 Liechtenstein by-election ===
Candidate	Party	Votes	%	Seats	+/–
Josef Hoop	Progressive Citizens' Party			4	▲4
Wilhelm Beck	Christian-Social People's Party			0	▼4
Total				4	–
Total votes		1,343	–		
Source: Nohlen & Stöver, Vogt

=== 1932 Liechtenstein general election ===
Candidate	Party	Votes	%	Seats	+/–
Josef Hoop	Progressive Citizens' Party			13	▼2
Wilhelm Beck	Christian-Social People's Party			2	▲2
Total				15	–
Total votes		2,173	–		
Registered voters/turnout		2,347	92.59		
Source: Nohlen & Stöver, Vogt

=== 1936 Liechtenstein general election ===
Candidate	Party	Votes	%	Seats	+/–
Josef Hoop	Progressive Citizens' Party			11	▼2
Otto Schaedler	Patriotic Union			4	▲2
Total				15	–
Total votes		2,510	–		
Registered voters/turnout		2,628	95.51		
Source: Nohlen & Stöver, Vogt

=== 1939 Liechtenstein general election (Note: No actual voting took place.) ===
Candidate	Party	Seats	+/–
Josef Hoop	Progressive Citizens' Party	8	▼3
Otto Schaedler	Patriotic Union	7	▲3
Total		15	0
Source: Nohlen & Stöver

=== 1945 Liechtenstein general election ===
Candidate	Party	Votes	%	Seats	+/–
Josef Hoop	Progressive Citizens' Party	1,553	54.72	8	0
Otto Schaedler	Patriotic Union	1,285	45.28	7	0
Total		2,838	100.00	15	–
Valid votes		2,838	97.66		
Invalid/blank votes		68	2.34		
Total votes		2,906	100.00		
Registered voters/turnout		3,088	94.11		
Source: Nohlen & Stöver, Vogt

== Landtag elections ==
=== 1957 Liechtenstein general election ===
==== Oberland (electoral district) ====
Candidate	Party	Votes	%
Josef Hoop	Progressive Citizens' Party	1,052	100.00
Total		1,052	100.00
Registered voters/turnout		2,353	–
Source: Liechtensteiner Volksblatt

=== 1958 Liechtenstein general election ===
Oberland (electoral district)

Candidate	Party	Votes	%
Josef Hoop	Progressive Citizens' Party	1,133	100.00
Total		1,133	100.00
Registered voters/turnout		2,381	–
Source: Liechtensteiner Volksblatt

== Bibliography ==
- Nohlen, Dieter; Stöver, Philip (2010). Elections in Europe: A data handbook. Nomos. ISBN 978-3-8329-5609-7.
- Vogt, Paul (1987). 125 Jahre Landtag (in German). Vaduz: Landtag of the Principality of Liechtenstein.
