= Brigitte Gerney =

Liechtensteiner woman who survived a crane crash in 1985 (1936–2021)

Brigitte Gerney (14 March 1936 – 11 June 2021) was a Liechtenstein-born woman who was known as the Crane Lady.

== Biography ==
Gerney was born as Brigitte Risch in Vaduz, Liechtenstein on 14 March 1936 to Martin Risch, a member of parliament. After receiving her high school education, she joined a secretarial school located in Switzerland, where she worked as a secretary.

In 1966, she married Arkadi Gerney and moved to New York.

In 1985, her legs were severely injured when a crane collapsed on her in New York. Later, she received $10 million in damages.

In June 2021, she died at the age of 85.
