= Rupert Quaderer =

Liechtenstein historian (born 1942)

- Born: 20 June 1942 (age 84); Schaan, Liechtenstein
- Occupation: Historian
- Spouse: Elfriede Vogt (m. 1974)
- Children: 2
- Parent(s): Rupert Quaderer; Maria Thöny

Rupert Quaderer (born 20 June 1942) is a historian from Liechtenstein and former research officer at the Liechtenstein Institute for history. His works have included numerous publications on the political and diplomatic history of Liechtenstein.

== Life ==
Quaderer was born on 20 June 1942 in Schaan as the son of journalist and municipal councillor Rupert Quaderer and Maria Thöny as one of five children. He graduated from secondary school in 1962 and then from 1962 to 1968 he studied history in Freiburg im Breisgau and Vienna.

From 1969 to 2002 Quaderer worked as a high school teacher for history and German languages in Vaduz. From 1999 to 2014 he was the research officer at the Liechtenstein Institute for contemporary history of the country, where he particularly focused on political developments in Liechtenstein in the 1910s and 1920s.

From 1986 to 2005 he was a board member of the Historical Association of the Principality of Liechtenstein, and has been its chairman since 1996. In 2017, along with Peter Geiger, he was honoured with a commemorative publication published jointly by the Liechtenstein Institute and the Historical Association of the Principality of Liechtenstein.

Quaderer married Elfriede Vog on 14 April 1974 and they have two children together.
