= Alfred Quaderer =

Liechtenstein collaborator with Nazi Germany executed by Switzerland (1920–1944)

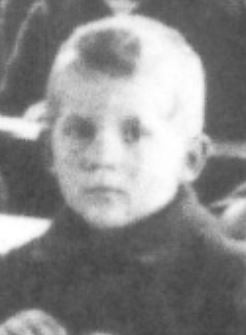
- Quaderer from a 1930 primary school photo
- Born: 20 April 1920; Schaan, Liechtenstein
- Died: 7 June 1944 (aged 24); Hedingen, Switzerland
- Criminal charges: Espionage, treason
- Criminal penalty: Execution by firing squad
- Espionage activity
- Allegiance: Nazi Germany
- Agency: Volksdeutsche Mittelstelle
- Service years: 1941–1943

Alfred Quaderer (20 April 1920 – 7 June 1944) was a Liechtenstein citizen who was executed by Switzerland in 1944 for spying on behalf of Nazi Germany.

== Life ==
Quaderer was from Schaan and attended school in the municipality. He worked in construction in Feldkirch in 1939, from which he gained contacts with the Volksdeutsche Mittelstelle. Starting from 1941, he was deployed in Switzerland where he was tasked with gaining military intelligence, under the alias of a painter in Erstfeld. His activities included the seducing of three local Swiss soldiers and bribing a corporal in order to obtain military intelligence.

On 2 January 1943, he was arrested in Buchs outside of the Liechtenstein border. He was interrogated by first the Kantonspolizei Zürich then by the Kantonspolizei St. Gallen, where he confessed. He was held in solitary confinement in St. Gallen until he was sentenced to death for treason against Switzerland in March 1944. Despite efforts by Quaderer's sister and mother to have him pardoned, as such as pleading to Franz Joseph II for a private audience, they were denied an audience, and the sentence was upheld. He was executed by firing squad on 7 June 1944, aged 24 years old.

== Bibliography ==
- Geiger, Peter (1999). Landesverrat. Der Fall des 1944 in der Schweiz hingerichteten Alfred Quaderer (in German) (98 ed.). Vaduz: Jahrbuch des Historischen Vereins für das Fürstentum Liechtenstein. pp. 109–142.
- Fuhrer, Hans-Rudolf (1982). Spionage gegen die Schweiz. Die geheimen deutschen Nachrichtendienste gegen die Schweiz im Zweiten Weltkrieg 1939–1945 (in German). Frauenfeld.
