= Liechtenstein Homeland Service =

Defunct political party in Liechtenstein

Liechtenstein Homeland Service Liechtensteiner Heimatdienst
- Abbreviation: LHD
- Founded: 1 October 1933; 93 years ago
- Dissolved: 1 January 1936; 90 years ago
- Merged into: Patriotic Union
- Newspaper: Stimme für heimische Wirtschaft, Kultur und Volkstum (Voice for local business, culture and folklore)
- Ideology: Corporate statism Nazism
- Political position: Far-right

Liechtenstein Homeland Service (German: Liechtensteiner Heimatdienst, LHD) was a political party in Liechtenstein that advocated corporate statism and the abolition of party politics. Shortly after its founding, the party also moved towards Nazism. It merged with the Christian-Social People's Party to form the Patriotic Union in 1936.

== History ==
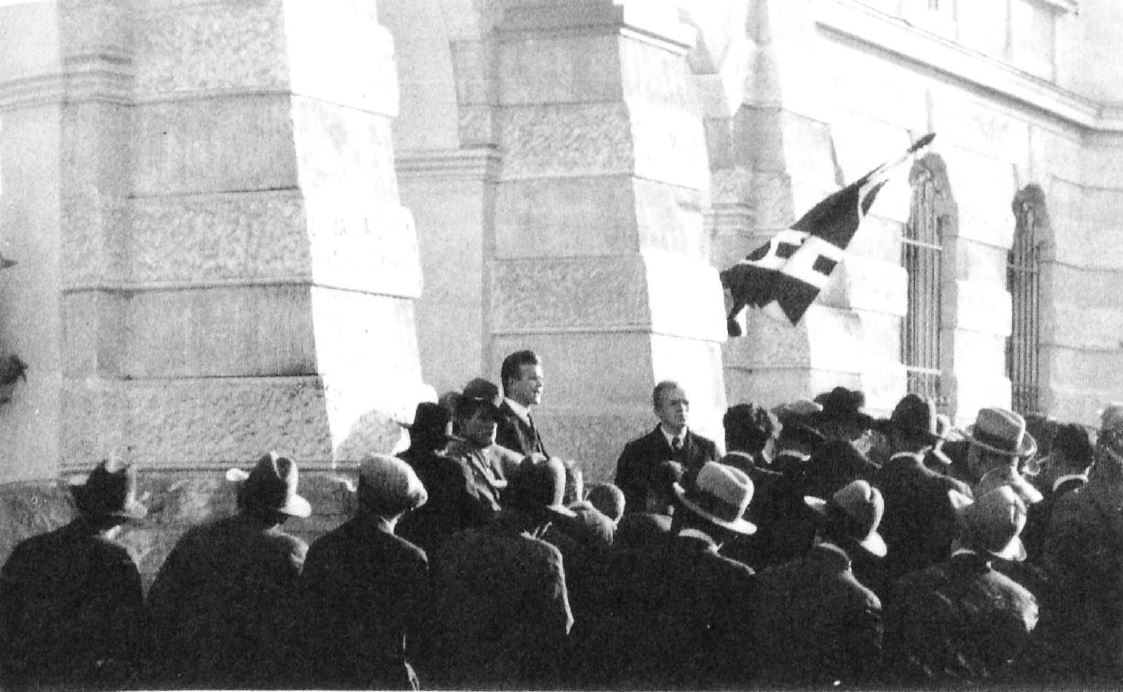
LHD rally on 9 December 1934. At the front, Alois Vogt can be seen on the left and Carl Freiherr von Vogelsang on the right.

The LHD was formed on 1 October 1933, with Otto Schaedler, Alois Vogt and Carl Freiherr von Vogelsang as leading members. Although the party was initially formed on the basis of an authoritarian corporate state similar to that of Austria under Engelbert Dollfuss, it quickly moved towards that of Nazism. The people behind the Rotter kidnapping also became active in the party following their release from prison. This move towards Nazism caused several founding members, such as Richard Meier, Gustav Ospelt, and Martin Risch to abandon the party. The party briefly held a seat in the Landtag of Liechtenstein when Georg Frick left the Progressive Citizens' Party (FBP) to found the party, but he too abandoned the party following the move towards Nazism and subsequently re-joined the FBP.

The party ran an antisemitic campaign within Liechtenstein and advocated against the government's naturalization policies. In addition, the party also developed a cult of personality similar to that of Nazi Germany, with the phrase 'Heil Otto!' being used towards Schaedler within the party. The party's primary aims were the abolition of party politics, ending the customs union with Switzerland, and alignment towards Germany, with the eventual goal of Liechtenstein's annexation into the country. The party sought to gain contacts within Nazi Germany, particularly within the Verein für Deutsche Kulturbeziehungen im Ausland (VDA). In doing so, Rudolf Schädler, Vogt and Vogelsang were guests at the 1934 Nuremberg rally. In a speech on 18 March 1934, both prime minister Josef Hoop and president of the Landtag Anton Frommelt spoke out against the LHD.

In 1935, the LHD formed an alliance with the Christian-Social People's Party (VP) which was referred to as the 'National Opposition'. This alliance pushed through an initiative to introduce proportional representation within the country. However, the subsequent 1935 Liechtenstein electoral system referendum was narrowly rejected by voters. Motivated by a desire to unite the opposition prior to the 1936 Liechtenstein general election, the VP and LHD merged on 1 January 1936 to form the Patriotic Union (VU). Despite the LHD being the smaller of the two parties, the new VU was heavily influenced by it, with Schaedler becoming the party president, and Vogt the party secretary. In addition, the two parties' respective newspapers merged to form the Liechtensteiner Vaterland with Vogelsang as its editor.

== Bibliography ==
- Nohlen, Dieter; Stöver, Philip (2010). Elections in Europe: A data handbook. Nomos. ISBN 978-3-8329-5609-7.
- Geiger, Peter (1997a). Liechtenstein in den Dreissigerjahren 1928–1939 (in German) (1st ed.). Zürich: Liechtenstein Institute. ISBN 3-906393-28-3.
- Geiger, Peter (1997b). Liechtenstein in den Dreissigerjahren 1928–1939 (in German) (2nd ed.). Zürich: Liechtenstein Institute. ISBN 3-906393-28-3.
