= Martin Risch =

President of the Landtag of Liechtenstein from 1960 to 1965

- Risch in 1928

President of the Landtag of Liechtenstein
- In office January 1960 – December 1965
- Monarch: Franz Joseph II
- Vice President: Alois Vogt; Otto Schaedler
- Preceded by: Josef Hoop
- Succeeded by: Alexander Frick

Personal details
- Born: 17 September 1899 Triesen, Liechtenstein
- Died: 1 January 1970 (aged 70) Triesen, Liechtenstein
- Party: Progressive Citizens' Party
- Other political affiliations: Liechtenstein Homeland Service
- Spouse: Maria Goop (m. 1934)
- Children: 8

Martin Risch (/rɪʃ/ German: [ˈmaɾtɪn rɪʃ]; 17 September 1899 – 5 January 1970) was a physician and political figure from Liechtenstein who served as the President of the Landtag of Liechtenstein from 1960 to 1965.

== Early life and medical career ==
Risch was born on 17 September 1899 in Triesen as one of nine children. His mother died shortly after his birth and he was raised by foster parents throughout his childhood. He attended high school in Küssnacht from 1915 to 1922 and then went on to study medicine in Innsbruck and Vienna, where he received a degree in 1929. He also trained in gynaecology in Erfurt and surgery in Dresden.

In 1931 Risch opened a medical practice in Eschen where he arranged for maternity wards to be set up within community homes in Eschen and Triesen. In 1934 he moved to Vaduz as he was appointed a state physicist. He was a member of the Liechtenstein Medical Commission for more than 30 years and was as a medical officer for the Liechtenstein Red Cross from 1945 to 1969.

== Political career ==
Risch entered politics as a member of the Progressive Citizens' Party in which he left to become founding member of the Liechtenstein Homeland Service in October 1933 and acted as a representative of the medical profession within the party. However, by the end of 1933 he had left the party due to its move towards Nazism and re-joined the Progressive Citizens' Party.

He was elected into the Landtag of Liechtenstein in February 1953, which he served in until 1966. He was the President of the Landtag of Liechtenstein from January 1960 to December 1965 being appointed after the death of Josef Hoop in 1959.

He was also a co-founder of Rheinmark academic association and the vice president of the Rotary Club of Liechtenstein. He was a member of the supervisory board of the National Bank of Liechtenstein from 1956 until his death in 1970.

== Personal life ==
Risch married Maria Goop (17 May 1911 – 7 July 1981) on 17 June 1934 and they had eight children together. He was buried in Vaduz, where his wife was later buried.

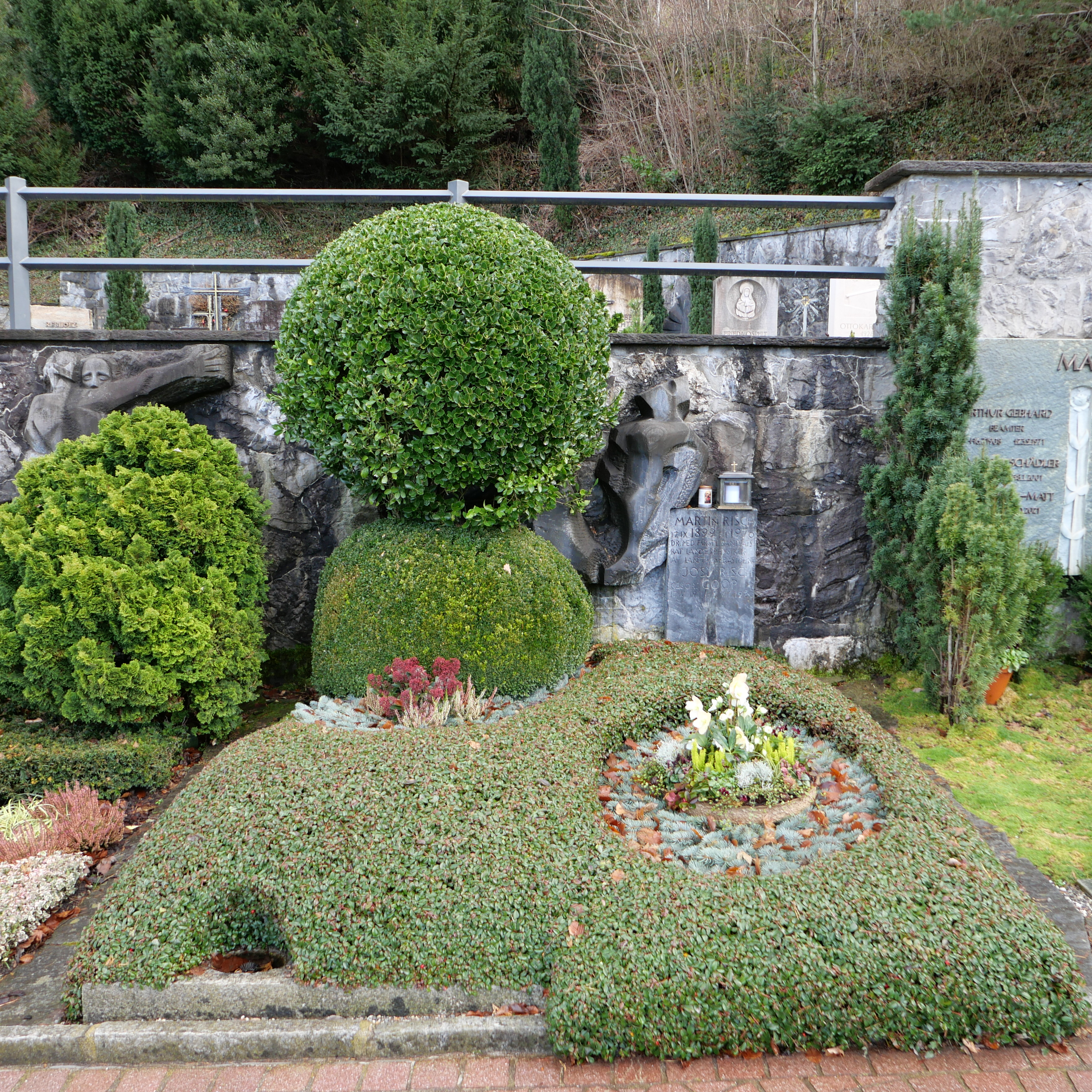
The grave in 2024.

Risch died on 5 January 1970 in Triesen, aged 70 years old.

== Honours ==
- Liechtenstein: Grand Cross of the Order of Merit of the Principality of Liechtenstein.
