= Carl Freiherr von Vogelsang =

German and Liechtensteiner journalist (1900–1977)

Personal details
- Born: 1 July 1900 Bad Wörishofen, German Empire
- Died: 4 April 1977 (aged 76) Lübeck, West Germany
- Party: Nazi Party (1937–1945)
- Other political affiliations: Patriotic Union
- Spouse: Lotte Wegener (m. 1940)
- Children: 2
- Profession: Journalist

Military service
- Allegiance: Austria-Hungary
- Branch: Austro-Hungarian Army
- Years of service: 1917–1918
- Wars: World War I

Carl Freiherr von Vogelsang (1 July 1900 – 4 April 1977) was a German and Liechtensteiner journalist.

== Early life ==
Vogelsang was born on 1 July 1900 in Bad Wörishofen as the son of Ludwig von Vogelsang and Veronika Waibel as one of six children.

He briefly attended the Stella Matutina Jesuit school in Feldkirch before moving to Vienna where in 1917 he volunteered in the Austro-Hungarian Army during World War I, where he served until the end of the war. He then trained as a bookbinder in Kleve and attended the Cologne art school until 1929.

== Career ==
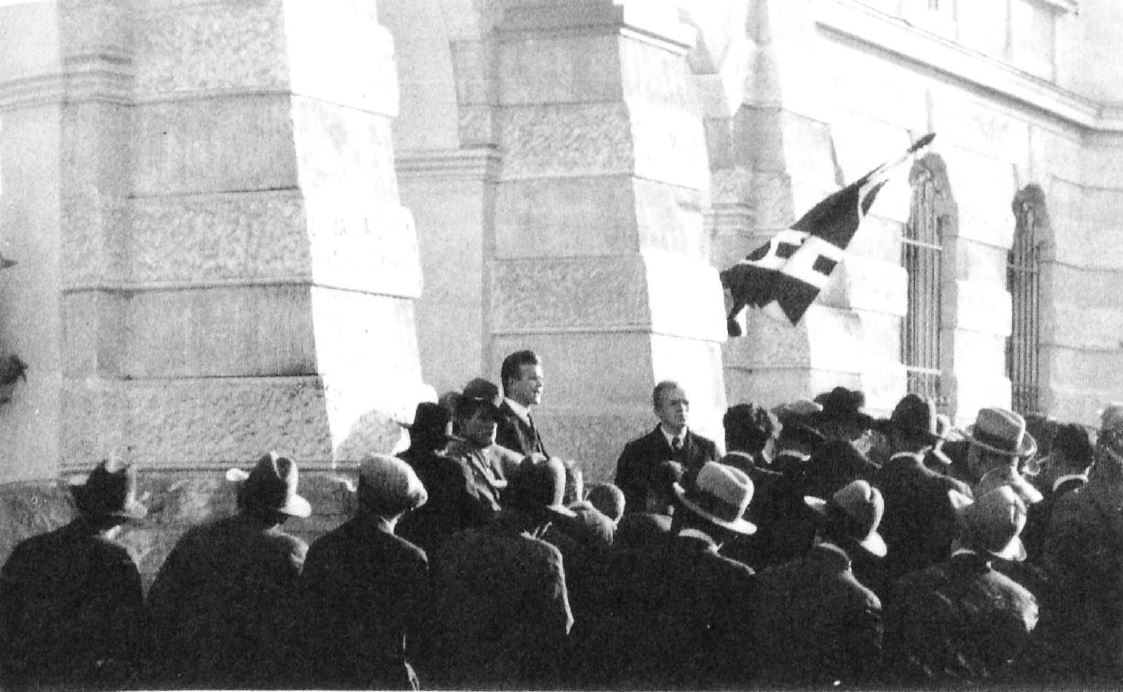
LHD rally on 9 December 1934. At the front, Vogelsang can be seen on the right.

In 1931 Vogelsang moved to Liechtenstein. He founded the Scouts of Liechtenstein department in Vaduz and headed it until 1934. In 1933 he co-founded the Liechtenstein Homeland Service and was the editor of the party's newspaper. After the Liechtenstein Homeland Service and Christian-Social People's Party merged to form the Patriotic Union in 1936, Vogelsang headed the editorial team of the Liechtensteiner Vaterland.

Vogelsang had been secretly trying to become a member of the Nazi Party since 1932, when he successfully did so in 1937. In January 1937 he publicly denounced Jews living in Liechtenstein and sent numerous letters detailing them to officials in Nazi Germany. As a result, Prime Minister of Liechtenstein Josef Hoop ordered the offices of the Vaterland to be searched for any letters to be confiscated and Vogelsang promptly left the country. The majority of the Landtag of Liechtenstein approved of Hoop's actions, but members of the Patriotic Union called for his resignation over the issue, believing the search to be unconstitutional. Notably fellow Patriotic Union members Otto Schaedler along with Alois Vogt in an act in protest against the government publicly rejected the allegations against von Vogelsang. It was decided that two special judges would determine the legal implications of the case. Eventually, in July 1937 it was concluded by both judges that Hoop had not acted unconstitutionally by ordering the search against Vogelsang and was subsequently legally acquitted of any wrongdoing.

From Nazi Germany, Vogelsang retained contacts with the German National Movement in Liechtenstein until 1939. As World War II went on, he became less sympathetic to Nazism. After the war, he worked as a Roman Catholic journalist in West Germany.

== Personal life ==
Vogelsang married Lotte Wegener (14 January 1915 – 19 July 1994) on 27 April 1940 and they had two children together.

He died on 4 April 1977 in Lübeck, aged 76.
