= Eugen Schädler =

Liechtenstein politician (1899–1973)

Member of the Landtag of Liechtenstein for Unterland
- In office 4 April 1939 – 1 September 1957

Personal details
- Born: 17 April 1899 Nendeln, Liechtenstein
- Died: 22 September 1973 (aged 74) Nendeln, Liechtenstein
- Party: Progressive Citizens' Party
- Spouse: Elwina Katharina Hoop (m. 1929)
- Relations: Albert Philipp Schädler (great-grandfather); Josef Hoop (brother-in-law)
- Children: 4, including Emma

Eugen Schädler (17 April 1899 – 22 September 1973) was an industrialist and politician from Liechtenstein who served in the Landtag of Liechtenstein from 1939 to 1957.

== Career ==
Schädler was born on 17 April 1899 in Nendeln as the son of deputy member of the Landtag and deputy government councillor Gebhard Schädler and Anna (née Beck). He attended teacher training college in Feldkirch, then pottery school in Steyr. Upon his father's death in 1929, he took over the pottery workshop business Keramik Werkstatt Schaedler AG, which he expanded into an industrial manufacturing company.

He was elected to the Landtag of Liechtenstein in 1939 as a member of the Progressive Citizens' Party (FBP) as a part of the unified list between the party and the Patriotic Union (VU) for the formation of a coalition government, where he served until 1957. During this time, he was a member of the Landtag's finance, audit and the state committee. From 1942 to 1951 he was also a member of the Eschen municipal council and from 1956 to 1959 he was a member of the supervisory board the of VP Bank.

Schädler married Elwina Katharina Hoop (14 March 1900 – 19 February 1980), the sister of prime minister Josef Hoop, on 25 July 1929 and they had four children together. He died of a long illness on 22 September 1973, aged 74. His daughter Emma was the first woman to serve in the Landtag from 1986 to 1993.

== Bibliography ==
- Vogt, Paul (1987). 125 Jahre Landtag (in German). Vaduz: Landtag of the Principality of Liechtenstein.
