= Rupert Quaderer (journalist) =

Liechtenstein politician and journalist (1891–1975)

- Born: 9 May 1891; Schaan, Liechtenstein
- Died: 14 September 1975 (aged 84); Schaan, Liechtenstein
- Spouse: Maria Thöny (m. 1924; died 1974)
- Children: 5, including Rupert Quaderer

Rupert Quaderer (9 May 1891 – 14 September 1975) was a politician and journalist from Liechtenstein.

== Career ==
Quaderer was born on 9 May 1891 in Schaan as the son of his father by the same name and Katharina Bargetze. He had an apprenticeship as a bookseller at the Franz Unterberger bookstore in Feldkirch. In 1919, he opened a bookstore in Schaan. He worked in the law firm Ritter & Beck Rechtsanwälte for several years.

From 1924 to 1927 Quaderer was the Schaan municipal treasurer. He was a member of the local school board from 1938 to 1941 and from 1942 to 1948 a member of the Schaan municipal council as a member of the Patriotic Union. In 1938, and again from 1939 to 1940, he was the editor of the Liechtensteiner Vaterland. From 1946 to 1965 he was the head of the Liechtenstein Motor Vehicle Inspection Office.

Quaderer married Maria Thöny (31 October 1899 – 27 July 1974) on 17 November 1924 and they had five children together. His son, Rupert Quaderer is a Liechtenstein historian.

He died on 14 September 1975 in Schaan, aged 84 years old.
