= Alexander Quaderer =

Liechtenstein footballer

Personal information
- Date of birth: 13 February 1971 (age 55)
- Position: Midfielder

Senior career*
Years	Team	Apps	(Gls)
1992–1994	FC Vaduz		
1994–1996	FC Schaan		
1996–1997	FC Vaduz		

International career
1993–1997	Liechtenstein	7	(0)
- * Club domestic league appearances and goals

Alexander Quaderer (born 13 February 1971) is a retired Liechtenstein football midfielder.
