= Liechtensteiner Vaterland =

Daily newspaper in Liechtenstein

- Front cover of the print edition, 10 February 2025
- Format: Daily newspaper (except Sundays)
- Owner: Vaduzer Medienhaus AG
- Founded: 1 January 1936; 90 years ago
- Political alignment: Patriotic Union
- Language: German
- City: Vaduz
- Country: Liechtenstein
- ISSN: 1818-9202
- OCLC number: 870441231
- Website: vaterland.li

Liechtensteiner Vaterland (German pronunciation: [ˌlɪçtn̩ʃtaɪnɐ ˈfaːtɐˌlant]; lit. "Liechtenstein Fatherland") is the largest daily newspaper in Liechtenstein. Published by Vaduzer Medienhaus AG, it is the official newspaper of the Patriotic Union party.

== History ==
In January 1936, Christian-Social People's Party and Liechtenstein Homeland Service merged to form the Patriotic Union. As a result, the parties respective newspapers, the Liechtensteiner Nachrichten and Stimme für heimische Wirtschaft, Kultur und Volkstum merged to form the Liechtensteiner Vaterland with Carl Freiherr von Vogelsang as the first editor in chief.

The newspaper came under controversy in January 1937 when Vogelsang publicly denounced Jews living in Liechtenstein and sent numerous letters detailing them to officials in Nazi Germany. As a result, Prime Minister of Liechtenstein Josef Hoop ordered the offices of the Vaterland to be searched for any letters to be confiscated and Vogelsang promptly left the country. Editing was then taken over by Alois Vogt until 1938.

During World War II, the newspaper was edited by Otto Schaedler and former prime minister Gustav Schädler. Schädler had written a series of articles about Switzerland for the authorities of Nazi Germany during the war, supposedly for the German press, but in reality it was used by intelligence agencies such as the Verein für Deutsche Kulturbeziehungen im Ausland. As a result, in 1946 he was sentenced to six months in prison due to illegal intelligence providence, but did not serve the sentence for health reasons.

Like its predecessors, the newspaper was initially published twice a week until 1963 when it was increased to three, four in 1976 and since 1985 the newspaper has been daily. Until 2003, the publisher was the Presseverein Liechtensteiner Vaterland and since then Vaduzer Medienhaus AG. Starting in the 1990s, the newspaper also expanded to cover radio with the Eastern Swiss radio RadIo Ri. The newspaper also operates subsidiary newspapers Liewo Sonntagszeitung since 1999 and Wirtschaft Regional since 2001.

In March 2023, the closure of Liechtensteiner Volksblatt left the Vaterland the only remaining daily printed newspaper in the country. Subscribers of the Volksblatt automatically became subscribers of the Vaterland. Due to this, the Vaterland has announced its intention to move towards a politically neutral stance. However, the publisher, Vaduzer Medienhaus AG, has remained close to the Patriotic Union.

== List of editors-in-chief (1936–present) ==
| Name | Term | Ref |
|---|---|---|
| Carl Freiherr von Vogelsang | 1936–1937 | |
| Alois Vogt | 1937–1938 | |
| Rupert Quaderer | 1938 | |
| Josef Büchel | 1938–1939 | |
| Rupert Quaderer | 1939–1940 | |
| L. Seeger | 1940–1941 | |
| Josef Büchel | 1941–1943 | |
| Gustav Schädler & Otto Schaedler | 1943–1944 | |
| Gerold Schädler | 1945–1947 | |
| Erich Seeger | 1948–1952 | |
| Ivo Beck | 1952–1958 | |
| Walter Oehry | 1958–1961 | |
| Hubert Marxer | 1962–1969 | |
| Hubert Hoch | 1970–1995 | |
| Günther Fritz | 1995–2015 | |
| Patrik Schädler | 2015–2025 | |
| Reto Furter | 2025–present | |

== See also ==
- Patriotic Union
- List of newspapers in Liechtenstein
