= Hermann E. Sieger =

Nazi Party official (1902–1954)

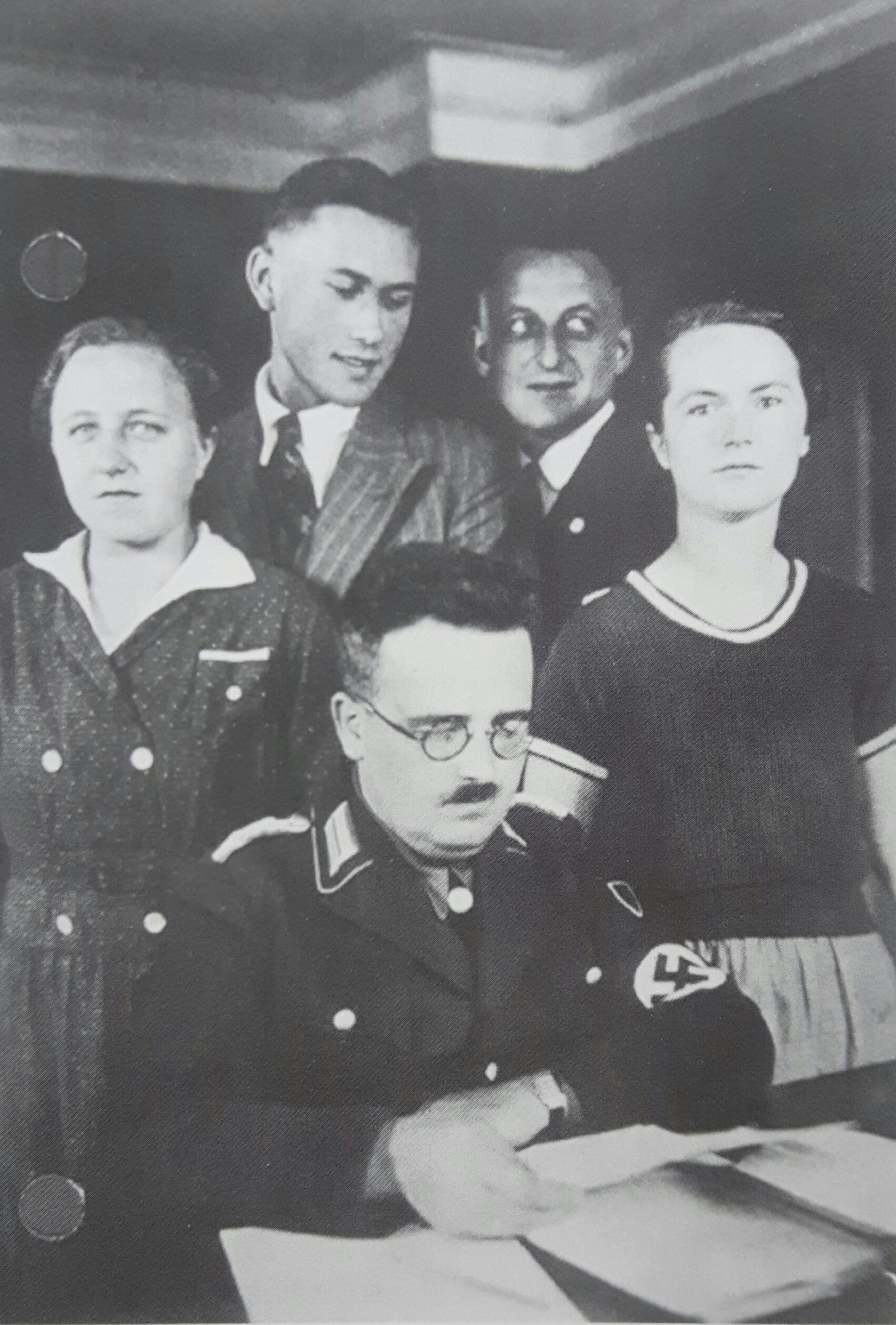
- Hermann E. Sieger (center) in the Lorch town hall
- Born: 16 June 1902
- Died: 21 November 1954 (aged 52); Göppingen, West Germany
- Employer: Nazi Party
- Known for: Nazi advisor to Liechtenstein's government
- Political party: Nazi Party

Hermann E. Sieger (16 June 1902 – 21 November 1954) was a German politician and philatelist who was the leader of the Nazi Party in Lorch, Württemberg from 1937 to 1945. He was a contributor to philately in Liechtenstein and was a trusted advisor and intermediate by the Liechtenstein government.

== Career ==
Sieger founded a publishing house in Lorch in 1922, and the same year established the Sieger Prize. He was a founding member of the Lorch branch of the Nazi Party in 1932 and was a councillor in the town. Following the introduction of Gleichschaltung, Sieger initiated the renaming of various streets in the town after Nazi figures. He was first deputy mayor from 1935 onwards.

From 1937 to 1945, he served as the local leader of the Nazi Party in Lorch, and was considered the de facto head of the area. Under his leadership, political opponents and personal enemies were prosecuted, imprisoned, sent to concentration camps, or even put to death. Sieger was referred to by mayor Wilhelm Scheufele as the "little dictator of Lorch". In addition, as a pronounced antisemite, Sieger excluded Jews from business in Lorch.

=== Relations with Liechtenstein ===
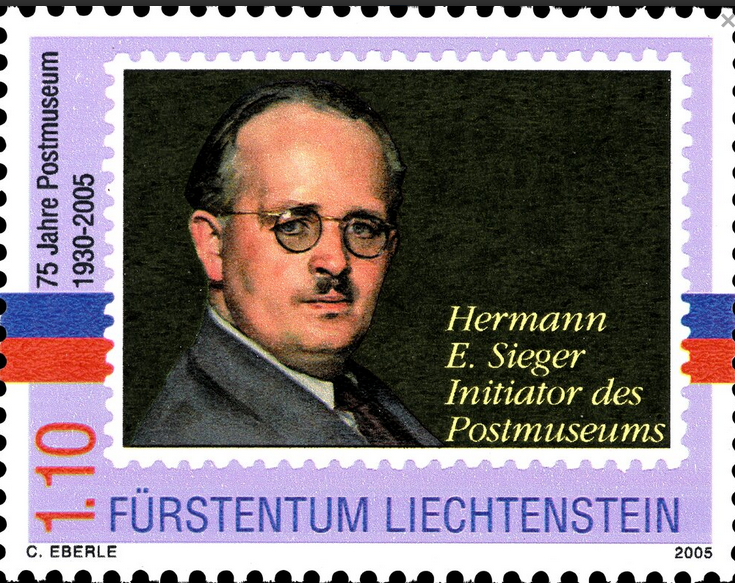
Sieger commemorated on a 2005 Liechtenstein stamp

Starting from 1922, Sieger was involved in Liechtenstein's philately, which had been damaged following its 1921 stamp affair. In 1930, he initiated the founding of the Liechtenstein Postal Museum by donating his collection of Liechtenstein stamps, and was its curator until 1949.

From 1933 to 1945, Sieger was considered the primary German contact of prime minister of Liechtenstein Josef Hoop and acted as an intermediate between Hoop and the German government. He was also considered a trusted advisor on business and stamp design. He held a Liechtenstein diplomatic passport from 1936. Following the failed 1939 Liechtenstein putsch in March, Sieger forwarded a report to the Foreign Office by Hoop detailing that the coup attempt was conducted by a small extremist group, that Liechtenstein wished to remain in a customs union with Switzerland, and that Hoop's government wished to preserve diplomatic relations with Germany.

Sieger, who had long pushed for Hoop to consider forming a customs union with Nazi Germany, including earlier that month, again pushed for it following the coup attempt. However, Hoop rejected this, stating that the vast majority of Liechtensteiners would not be willing to give up the customs union with Switzerland. Despite this, Sieger reported to the Foreign Office that public opinion in Liechtenstein was shifting towards economic integration with Germany, and that Hoop should be pressured "personally and privately" to move towards it. In response, the office rejected the notion and ordered Sieger to not take any more steps towards it.

In May 1945, as US forces entered Lorch, Sieger was briefly granted refuge in Liechtenstein by Hoop. However, this strained the relationship between Hoop and Franz Joseph II, Prince of Liechtenstein, which eventually resulted in Hoop's forced resignation as prime minister in September, and Sieger was deported from the country.

=== Later life ===
From 1945 to 1948, he was held prisoner in Ludwigsburg, and during denazification he was classified as a "Nazi follower". He died of a long illness in Göppingen on 21 November 1954, aged 52.

== Bibliography ==
- Wahl, Rainer; Schramm, Manfred (2004). Die Gemeinderäte und der Bürgermeister werden nicht mehr gewählt, sondern von der Partei ernannt (in German). Einhorn-Verlag. ISBN 3-936373-15-9.
- Schramm, Manfred. Die NSDAP und ihre Gliederungen in Lorch (in German).
- Haspel, Gudrun; Waible, Sonja. Rassenwahn – Zwangssterilisierung – Euthanasie – Antisemitismus (in German).
- Geiger, Peter (1997b). Liechtenstein in den Dreissigerjahren 1928–1939 [Liechtenstein in the 1930s 1928–1939] (in German). Vol. 2. Zürich: Liechtenstein Institute. ISBN 3-906393-28-3.
