= Schaedler Keramik AG =

Ceramic industrial manufacturer based in Liechtenstein

Coordinates: 47°11′50″N 9°32′28″E

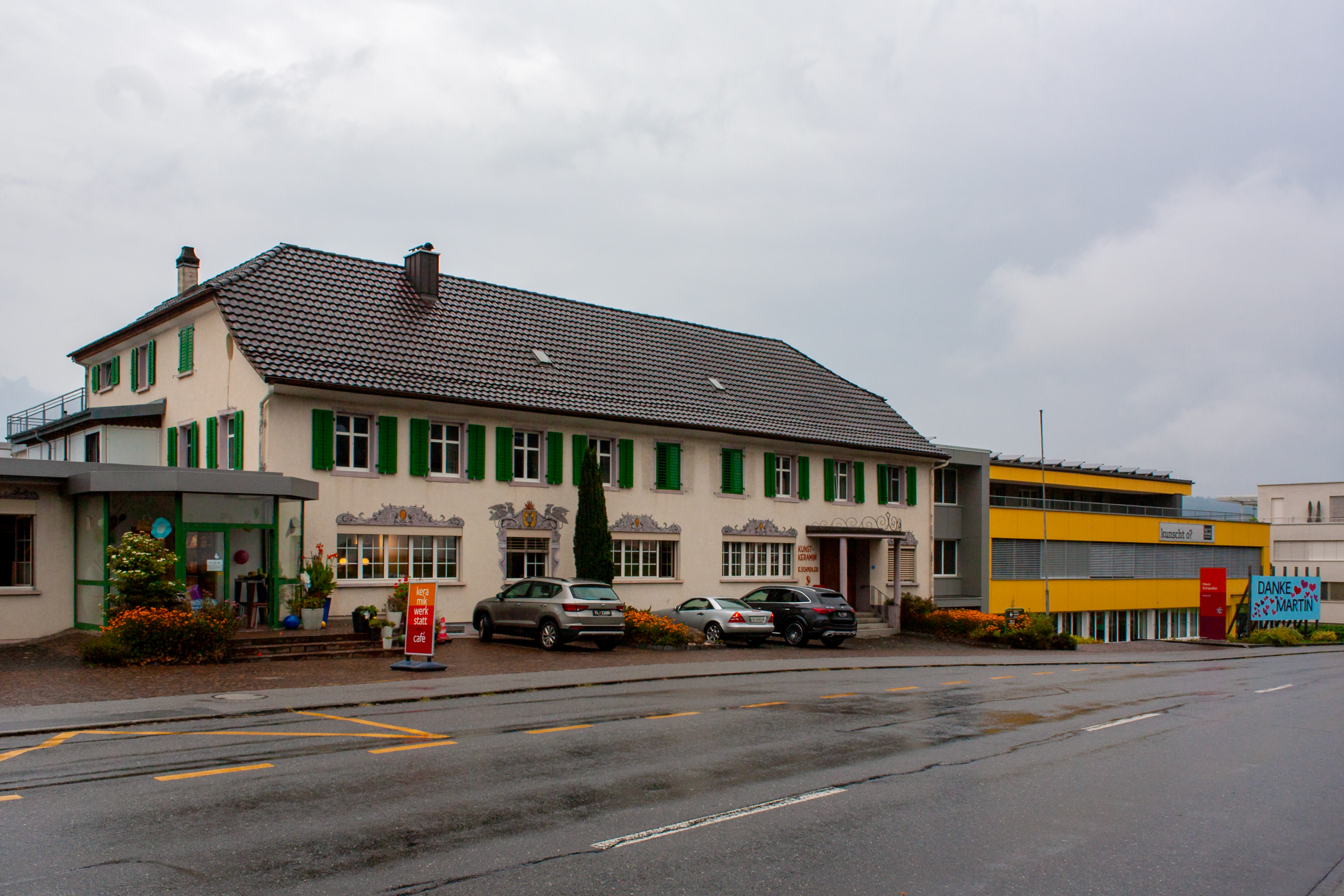
- Headquarters in Nendeln
- Formerly: Keramik Werkstatt Schaedler AG
- Founded: 1836
- Founder: Albert Philipp Schädler
- Headquarters: Churer Strasse 60, 9485, Nendeln, Liechtenstein
- Products: Ceramics

Schaedler Keramik AG (transl. Schaedler Ceramics AG) is a ceramics industrial manufacturing company based in Nendeln, Liechtenstein. Founded in 1836, it is believed to be the first industrial company in the country.

== History ==
The company was founded in 1836 as Keramik Werkstatt Schaedler AG by Albert Philipp Schädler. It initially produced stove tiles before expanding to also produce pipes and tableware. During this time, its primary areas of business was in Liechtenstein, eastern Switzerland and Vorarlberg. In 1929 its production was shifted towards utility ceramics and artwork. It was one of the first companies in Liechtenstein to produce enamelware.

In 1929 Eugen Schädler took over the business and transformed it into an industrial manufacturing company. In 1967 it became a joint-stock company and changed its name to Schaedler Keramik AG, which is still used today. In 1990, the company was employing 31 people.
