= Historical Association for the Principality of Liechtenstein =

Organization based in Liechtenstein

The Historical Association for the Principality of Liechtenstein (German: Historischer Verein für das Fürstentum Liechtenstein, HVFL) is a private historical association based in Schaan, Liechtenstein. Founded in 1901, its purpose is to research and promote the history of Liechtenstein.

== History ==
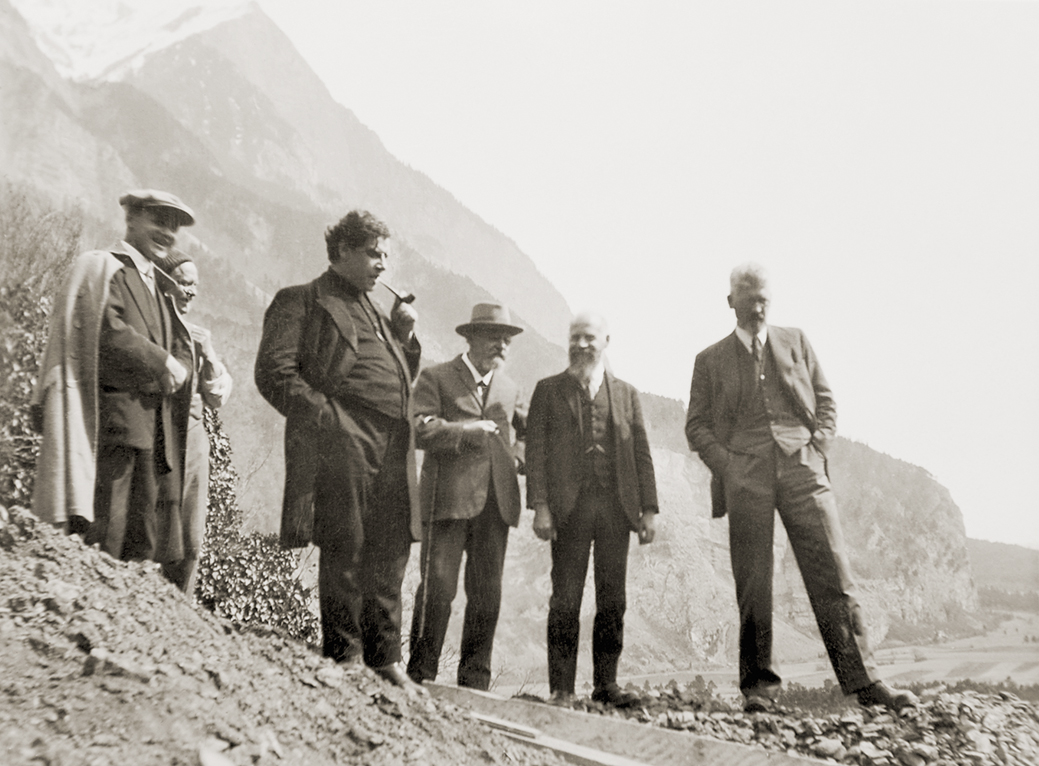
HVFL members at the site of an excavation in 1933

The HVFL was founded in February 1901 as a private association in Vaduz with the aim of preserving Liechtenstein's history. From 1912 onwards, its responsibilities expanded to preserve local heritage, monuments, and archaeology. Since its founding, the society has published an annual yearbook dedicated to the history of Liechtenstein.

In 1910 or 1911, the HVFL became responsible for items belonging to the House of Liechtenstein that had previously been on display in Vaduz Castle. Over the next 40 years the association expanded its collection of items relevant to the history of Liechtenstein, which eventually formed the presentation at the Liechtenstein National Museum from 1954 onwards.

Though some the associations tasks have been taken over by other institutions, it maintains several projects including the Liechtenstein Charter Book, Vorarlberg Linguistic Atlas, and the Historical Lexicon of the Principality of Liechtenstein, the latter in conjunction with the Liechtenstein Institute.
