= Peter Geiger =

Liechtensteiner historian (1942–2025)

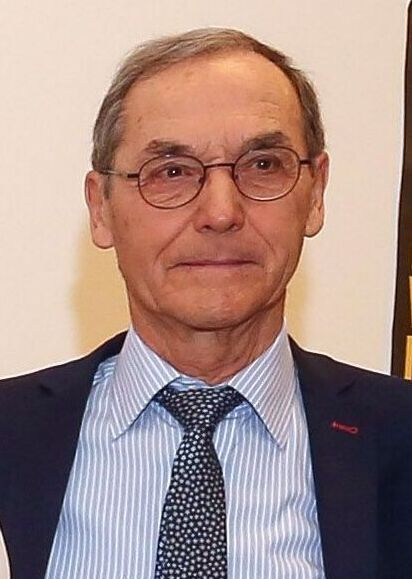
- Geiger in 2020
- Born: 22 October 1942; Klosters, Grisons, Switzerland
- Died: 6 April 2025 (aged 82); Schaan, Liechtenstein
- Occupation: Historian
- Spouse: Ursula Eberle (m. 1971)
- Children: 2

Peter Geiger (German pronunciation: [ˈpeːtɐ ˈɡaɪɡɐ]; 22 October 1942 – 6 April 2025) was a Liechtensteiner historian and research officer at the Liechtenstein Institute for history. His primary focus was on the history of Liechtenstein during the 1930s and World War II.

== Life and career ==
Geiger was born in Klosters, Switzerland on 22 October 1942. He attended teachers training college in Rorschach from 1958 to 1962. He then went on to study history, German studies and Romance studies at the University of Zurich and Vienna. He also spent an academic year in Seattle. He received a doctorate in Zurich in 1970.

From 1970 to 1987, he was a primary school teacher in Buchs, St. Gallen, and then from 1987 to 2007 he was a lecturer at the St. Gallen University of Teacher Education. From 1995 to 2025 he was a private lecturer at the University of Fribourg.

From 1987 to 2010, he was a research officer at the Liechtenstein Institute for the contemporary history of the country. He particularly focused on Liechtenstein in the 1930s and World War II. He also focused on other areas such as the Revolution of 1848 in Liechtenstein and the Austro-Prussian War in Liechtenstein. He was also a contributor to the Historical Lexicon of the Principality of Liechtenstein.

From 2010 to 2020, he was co-chairman of the Liechtenstein-Czech Commission of Historians. He wrote on Czech Republic–Liechtenstein relations, particularly the impact of land reform and work by the House of Liechtenstein on their properties, as well as the expropriation of Liechtenstein citizens living in Czechoslovakia after 1945.

In 2017, along with Rupert Quaderer, he was honoured with a commemorative publication published jointly by the Liechtenstein Institute and the Historical Association of the Principality of Liechtenstein.

== Personal life and death ==
Geiger lived in Schaan. He married Ursula Eberle on 13 April 1971 and they had two children. He died on 6 April 2025 of an illness, aged 82.
