= Otto Schaedler =

Liechtensteiner physician and politician (1898–1965)

Member of the Landtag of Liechtenstein for Oberland
- In office 25 March 1962 – 25 December 1965
- In office 16 February 1936 – 29 April 1945

Personal details
- Born: 9 June 1898 Balzers, Liechtenstein
- Died: 25 December 1965 (aged 67) Vaduz, Liechtenstein
- Party: Patriotic Union
- Other political affiliations: Liechtenstein Homeland Service
- Spouse: Maria Rheinberger (m. 1926)
- Children: 1

Otto Schaedler (/ˈʃɛdlər/ SHED-lər, German: [ˈɔtoː ˈʃɛːdlər]; 9 June 1898 – 25 December 1965) was a physician and political figure from Liechtenstein who served in the Landtag of Liechtenstein and was one of the founders of the Patriotic Union party.

== Early life ==
Schaedler was born on 9 June 1898 in Balzers as the son of farmer Emilian Adolf and his mother Emerita Gstöhl as one of 16 children.

Between 1910 and 1917 he studied in Mariahilf college. Between 1918 and 1923 he studied medicine in Munich and Innsbruck. He opened a medical practice in Eschen and moved to Vaduz in 1930.

== Career ==
Schaedler was a co-founder of the Liechtenstein Homeland Service in 1933. As the leader of the party, it quickly began to radicalize towards Nazism with a personality cult similar to that of Nazi Germany, with the phrase 'Heil Otto!' being used towards Schaedler within the party. Due to the introduction of anti-Jewish laws in Germany Liechtenstein experienced a large rise Jewish emigrants to the country in which Schaedler outspokenly opposed the naturalization of the refugees under a new citizenship law. He was an outspoken anti-Semite and was later accused of having sympathies for National socialism by the Liechtensteiner Volksblatt.

This party and the Christian-Social People's Party merged to form the Patriotic Union in 1936 and Schaedler was placed as the party's president, a position in which he held until June 1965. From 1936 to 1945 and again from 1962 to 1965 Schaedler served in the Landtag of Liechtenstein.

In January 1937 Liechtensteiner Vaterland editor and founding member of the Liechtenstein Homeland Service Carl Freiherr von Vogelsang publicly denounced Jews living in Liechtenstein and sent numerous letters detailing them to officials in Nazi Germany. As a result, Prime Minister of Liechtenstein, Josef Hoop ordered the offices of the Vaterland to be searched for any letters to be confiscated and Vogelsang promptly left the country. The majority of the Landtag approved of Hoop's actions, but members of the Patriotic Union called for his resignation over the issue, believing the search to be unconstitutional. Notably, Schaedler along with Alois Vogt in an act in protest against the government publicly rejected the allegations against von Vogelsang. It was decided that two special judges would determine the legal implications of the case. Eventually, in July 1937 it was concluded by both judges that Hoop had not acted unconstitutionally by ordering the search against Vogelsang and was subsequently legally acquitted of any wrong-doing.

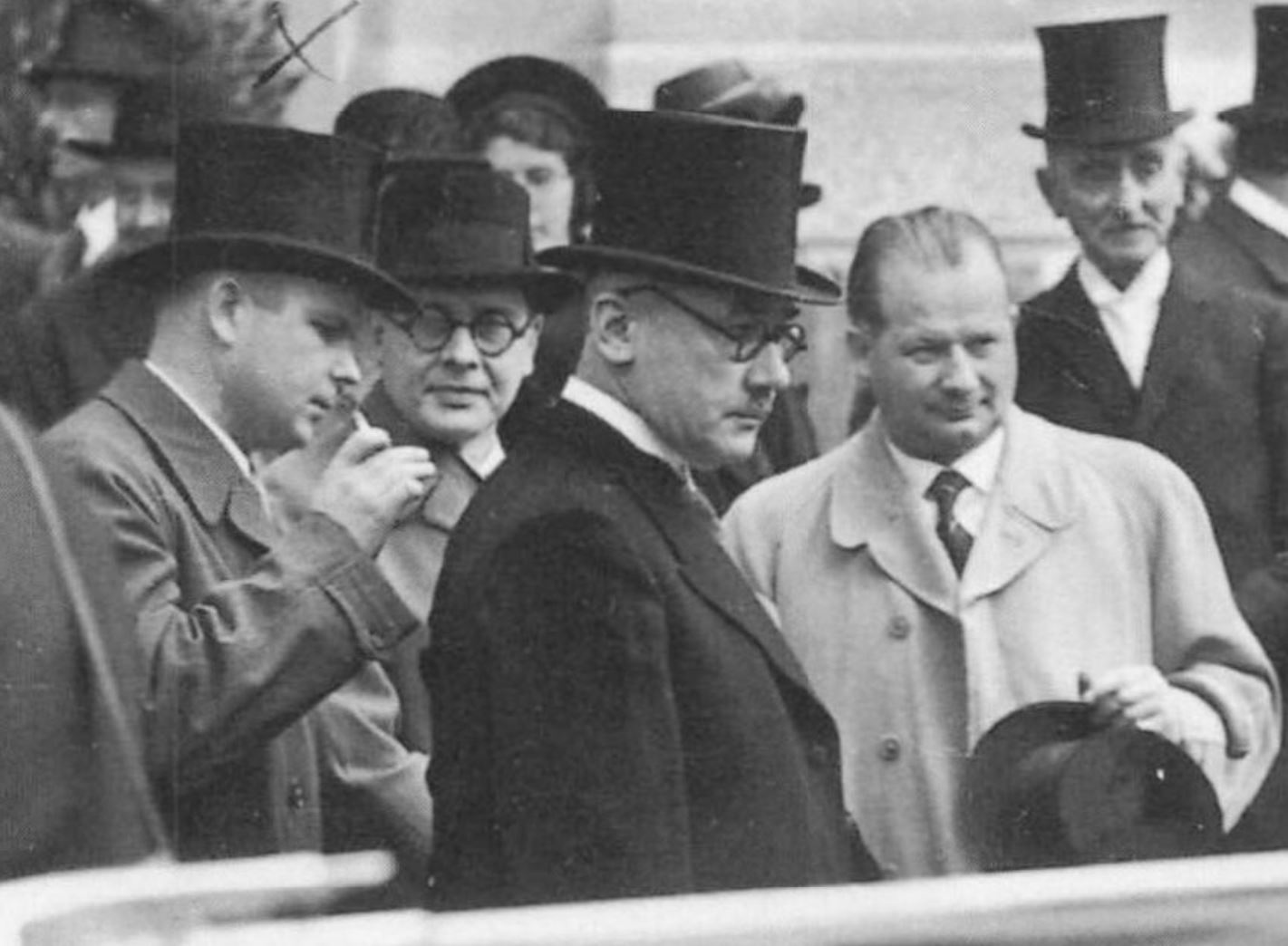
Schaedler (centre-left) with Alois Vogt, Josef Hoop and Ludwig Marxer. Around 1938.

In March 1938 Schaedler and the Patriotic Union participated in the coalition government formed in order to prevent government deadlock and help retain Liechtenstein's neutrality overseen by Franz Joseph II along with Josef Hoop and the Progressive Citizens' Party.

Despite being a member of the coalition, Schaedler retained contacts within Nazi Germany throughout the 1930s, particularly with the Volksdeutsche Mittelstelle and the Volksbund für das Deutschtum im Ausland. Josef Hoop rejected the fascist tendencies of the Liechtenstein Homeland Service. He was offered to be the leader of the German National Movement in Liechtenstein (VDBL) but refused and distanced himself from the party. His party faced suspicion after the VDBL attempted a coup in 1939. Schaedler agitated for a more cooperative stance towards Nazi Germany during World War II and recruited former Prime Minister Gustav Schädler as an editor of the Liechtensteiner Vaterland between 1943 and 1944. He worked closely with Alois Vogt who used his position to push relevant demands through Hoop. While key politicians in Liechtenstein were charged for their activities shortly after the war, Schaedler himself was never charged.

From 1945 to 1965 Schaedler was a member of the Liechtenstein sanitary commission and was also the state physician. He was a member of the state school board from 1950 to 1960.

== Personal life ==
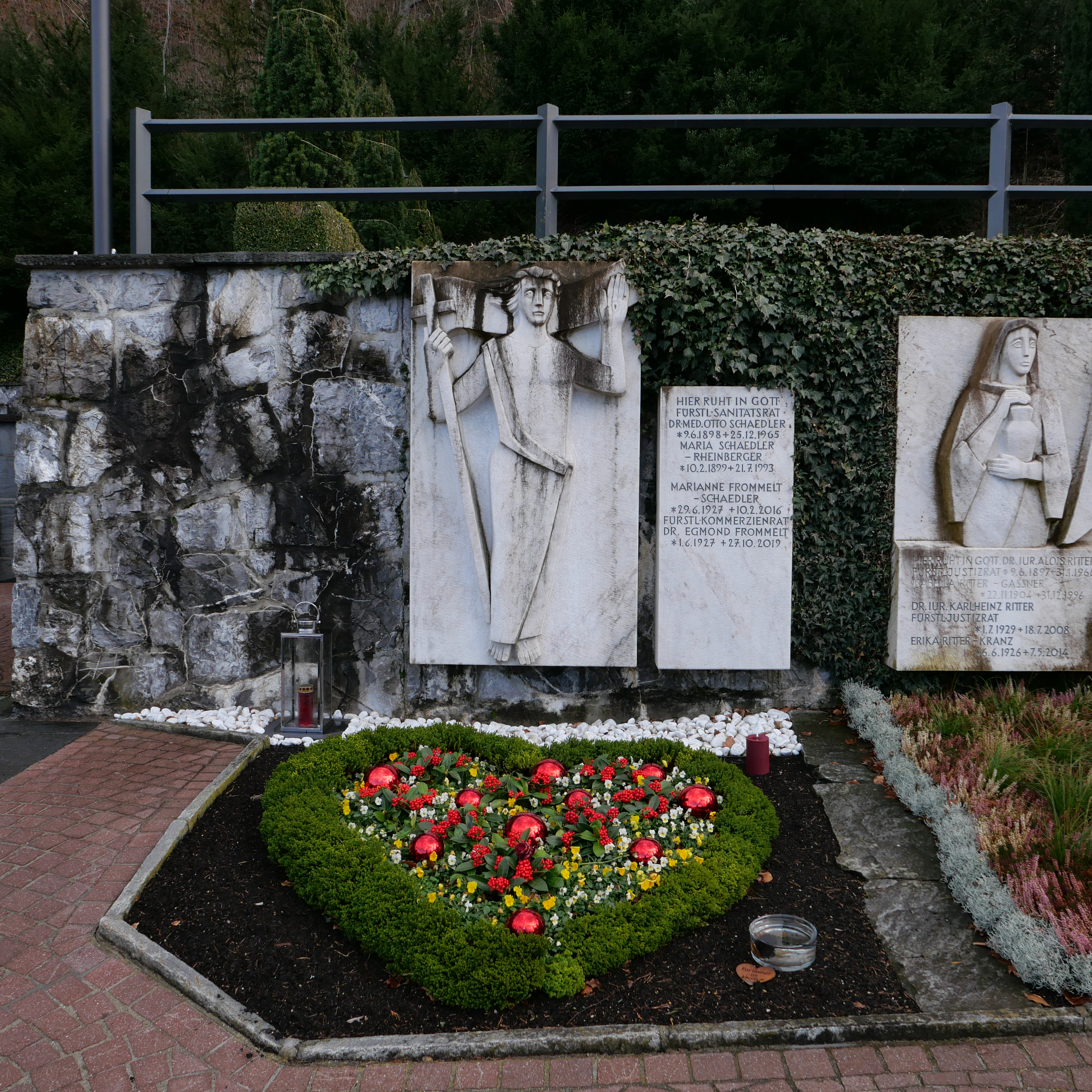
The family grave in 2024.

Schaedler married Maria Rheinberger (10 February 1899 – 21 July 1993) on 27 May 1926 and they had a daughter together.

Schaedler died of a heart attack in Vaduz on 25 December 1965, at the age of 67 years old. He is buried at the cemetery of Vaduz, along with his family.

== Honours ==
- Liechtenstein: Commander's Cross of the Order of Merit of the Principality of Liechtenstein (1939)
