= Liechtenstein Institute =

Scientific research center and academic institution in Bendern, Gamprin, Liechtenstein

Coordinates: 47.2112°N 9.5074°E

- Liechtenstein-Institut
- Established: 1986; 40 years ago
- President: Guido Meier
- Director: Thomas Meier
- Academic staff: 20
- Administrative staff: 3
- Location: Gamprin-Bendern, Liechtenstein
- Website: liechtenstein-institut.li

The Liechtenstein Institute (German: Liechtenstein-Institut) is a scientific research center and academic institution in Gamprin-Bendern, Liechtenstein.

The institute carries out research into the history, politics, law, and economics of Liechtenstein.

== History and Structure ==
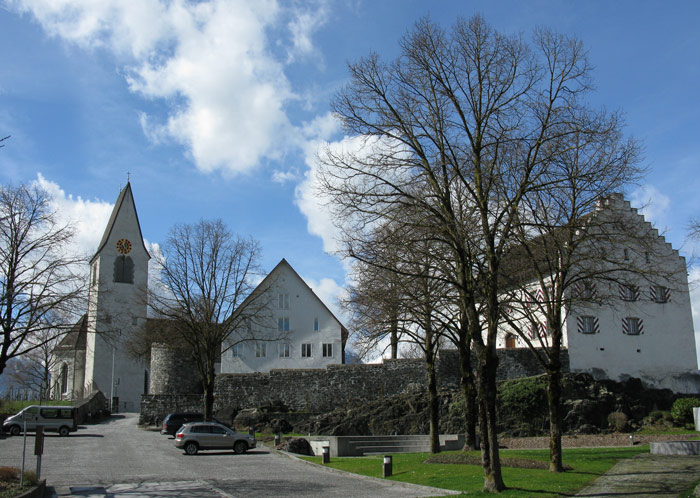
The chapel hill of Bendern; the Liechtenstein Institute appears in the middle of the photograph.

On August 15, 1986 (the national day of the Principality of Liechtenstein), by the initiative of Gerard Batliner, the Liechtenstein Institute was founded as a research center for practical and fundamental research relating to Liechtenstein.

The institute does not award degrees and does not offer primary class lectures, differing in this from the typical university; however, it does offer presentations, lecture series, and symposia on topics relevant to Liechtenstein. Thus, under the higher education act of the Principality of Liechtenstein, the Liechtenstein Institute is a university-like institution. The Institute is organised as an incorporated non-profit society under the private and corporate law of Liechtenstein.

Since 1998, the Institute has been located in what originally was the parsonage on the chapel hill of Bendern. In its founding and first years, the Institute relied solely on private contributions. At present, public authorities provide two-thirds of its budgeted means.

== Research ==
Historical research at the Liechtenstein Institute focuses on the time between the two World Wars and the transition to the reign of the Princely Family of Liechtenstein over the territory of the present state of Liechtenstein. Since 2016, the Liechtenstein Institute has been responsible for the Historical Dictionary of the Principality of Liechtenstein online (eHLFL), which is based on the 1988 initiated book format of the Dictionary by the Historical Association for the Principality of Liechtenstein. The eHLFL has become freely accessible online for everyone since November 2018.

Political and social-science studies chiefly relate to the political system of Liechtenstein and questions of European integration, as Liechtenstein is a member of the European Economic Area.

Jurisprudential study at the Institute is concerned with the public law of Liechtenstein, particularly administrative and constitutional law. Since 2016 the Liechtenstein Institute publishes the online commentary on the Constitution of the Principality of Liechtenstein. It is open access.

Economic research is primarily concerned with small state economics, public finance, and macroeconomic analyses. With e.g. the business cycle index KonSens and GDP estimates beyond the available official data, the Liechtenstein Institute generates key macroeconomic indicators that are indicative for the Liechtenstein economy.

Results of research conducted at the Institute are published as books and as papers in scientific journals. Most of the researchers' publications are freely accessible online. They can be found in the Institute's database. Additionally, the Institute prepares reports and surveys for the government of Liechtenstein, including governmental agencies and municipalities.

The Institute achieves its goals also through contributions to external scientific conferences, through its own events, through media coverage, and through international cooperation. In addition, the staff of the Liechtenstein Institute supervise dissertations and diploma theses, and teach within the framework of continuing professional education, adult education, and at universities and colleges.

In many of its areas of research, the Liechtenstein Institute is the sole academic-scientific institution in the country which devotes itself to issues of importance for Liechtenstein and the neighbouring regions.

== Library ==
The Liechtenstein Institute has a special library for the fields of history, law, politics, and economics, with a focus on Liechtenstein. The reference library is also available to external visitors. The library's holdings can be consulted on site, but cannot be borrowed. The library catalog of the Liechtenstein Institute is integrated into the general catalog of Liechtenstein libraries.

== Liechtenstein University Association ==
The Liechtenstein Institute is also a member of the Liechtenstein University Association, which also includes the University of Liechtenstein and the Private University in the Principality of Liechtenstein (UFL). The association represents Liechtenstein's higher education system at home and abroad, promotes cooperation between universities and university-like institutions, and carries out joint activities, such as events to promote links or a jointly designed magazine.
