= 1927 Liechtenstein local elections =

- January 1927

Local elections were held in Liechtenstein in January 1927 to elect the municipal councils and the mayors of the eleven municipalities.

== Results ==
=== Summary ===
Party	Mayors
Progressive Citizens' Party	6
Christian-Social People's Party	5
Total	11
Source: Rechenschafts-Bericht der fürstlichen Regierung

=== By municipality ===
Municipality	Party	Elected mayor
Balzers	Christian-Social People's Party	Basil Vogt
Eschen	Progressive Citizens' Party	Josef Marxer
Gamprin	Progressive Citizens' Party	Wilhelm Büchel
Mauren	Progressive Citizens' Party	Emil Batliner
Planken	Progressive Citizens' Party	Ferdinand Beck
Ruggell	Christian-Social People's Party	Johann Büchel
Schaan	Progressive Citizens' Party	Ferdinand Risch
Schellenberg	Christian-Social People's Party	Adolf Goop
Triesen	Christian-Social People's Party	Emil Bargetze
Triesenberg	Christian-Social People's Party	Alois Schädler
Vaduz	Progressive Citizens' Party	Bernhard Risch
Source: Rechenschafts-Bericht der fürstlichen Regierung
