= 1936 Liechtenstein local elections =

← 1933	19 January 1936	1939 →
- Mayoral results by municipality

Local elections were held in Liechtenstein on 19 January 1936 to elect the municipal councils and the mayors of the eleven municipalities.

== Results ==
=== Summary ===
Party	Mayors
Progressive Citizens' Party	8
Patriotic Union	3
Total	11
Source: Liechtensteiner Volksblatt

=== By municipality ===
Municipality	Party	Elected mayor
Balzers	Patriotic Union	Alois Wille
Eschen	Progressive Citizens' Party	Josef Meier
Gamprin	Patriotic Union	Josef Marxer
Mauren	Progressive Citizens' Party	David Meier
Planken	Progressive Citizens' Party	Gustav Jehle
Ruggell	Progressive Citizens' Party	Franz Xaver Hoop
Schaan	Progressive Citizens' Party	Ferdinand Risch
Schellenberg	Progressive Citizens' Party	Philipp Elkuch
Triesen	Patriotic Union	Ferdinand Heidegger
Triesenberg	Progressive Citizens' Party	Johann Beck
Vaduz	Progressive Citizens' Party	Ludwig Ospelt
Source: Liechtensteiner Volksblatt
