= 1930 Liechtenstein local elections =

← 1927	26 January 1930	1933 →

Local elections were held in Liechtenstein on 26 January 1930 to elect the municipal councils and the mayors of the eleven municipalities.

== Results ==
=== Summary ===
Party	Mayors
Progressive Citizens' Party	9
Christian-Social People's Party	2
Total	11
Source: Liechtensteiner Nachrichten

=== By municipality ===
Municipality	Party	Elected mayor
Balzers	Christian-Social People's Party	Basil Vogt
Eschen	Progressive Citizens' Party	Josef Marxer
Gamprin	Progressive Citizens' Party	Wilhelm Näscher
Mauren	Progressive Citizens' Party	David Bühler
Planken	Progressive Citizens' Party	Ferdinand Beck
Ruggell	Progressive Citizens' Party	Franz Xaver Hoop
Schaan	Progressive Citizens' Party	Ferdinand Risch
Schellenberg	Christian-Social People's Party	Adolf Goop
Triesen	Progressive Citizens' Party	Adolf Frommelt
Triesenberg	Progressive Citizens' Party	Heinrich Beck
Vaduz	Progressive Citizens' Party	Bernhard Risch
Source: Liechtensteiner Nachrichten
