= 1933 Liechtenstein local elections =

← 1930	22 January 1933	1936 →

Local elections were held in Liechtenstein on 22 January 1933 to elect the municipal councils and the mayors of the eleven municipalities.

== Results ==
=== Summary ===
Party	Mayors
Progressive Citizens' Party	9
Christian-Social People's Party	2
Total	11
Source: Liechtensteiner Volksblatt

=== By municipality ===
Municipality	Party	Elected mayor
Balzers	Christian-Social People's Party	Basil Vogt
Eschen	Progressive Citizens' Party	Josef Meier
Gamprin	Progressive Citizens' Party	Wilhelm Näscher
Mauren	Progressive Citizens' Party	David Bühler
Planken	Progressive Citizens' Party	Ferdinand Beck
Ruggell	Progressive Citizens' Party	Franz Xaver Hoop
Schaan	Progressive Citizens' Party	Ferdinand Risch
Schellenberg	Progressive Citizens' Party	Philipp Elkuch
Triesen	Progressive Citizens' Party	Adolf Frommelt
Triesenberg	Christian-Social People's Party	Johann Beck
Vaduz	Progressive Citizens' Party	Bernhard Risch
Source: Liechtensteiner Volksblatt
