= List of mayors of Schaan =

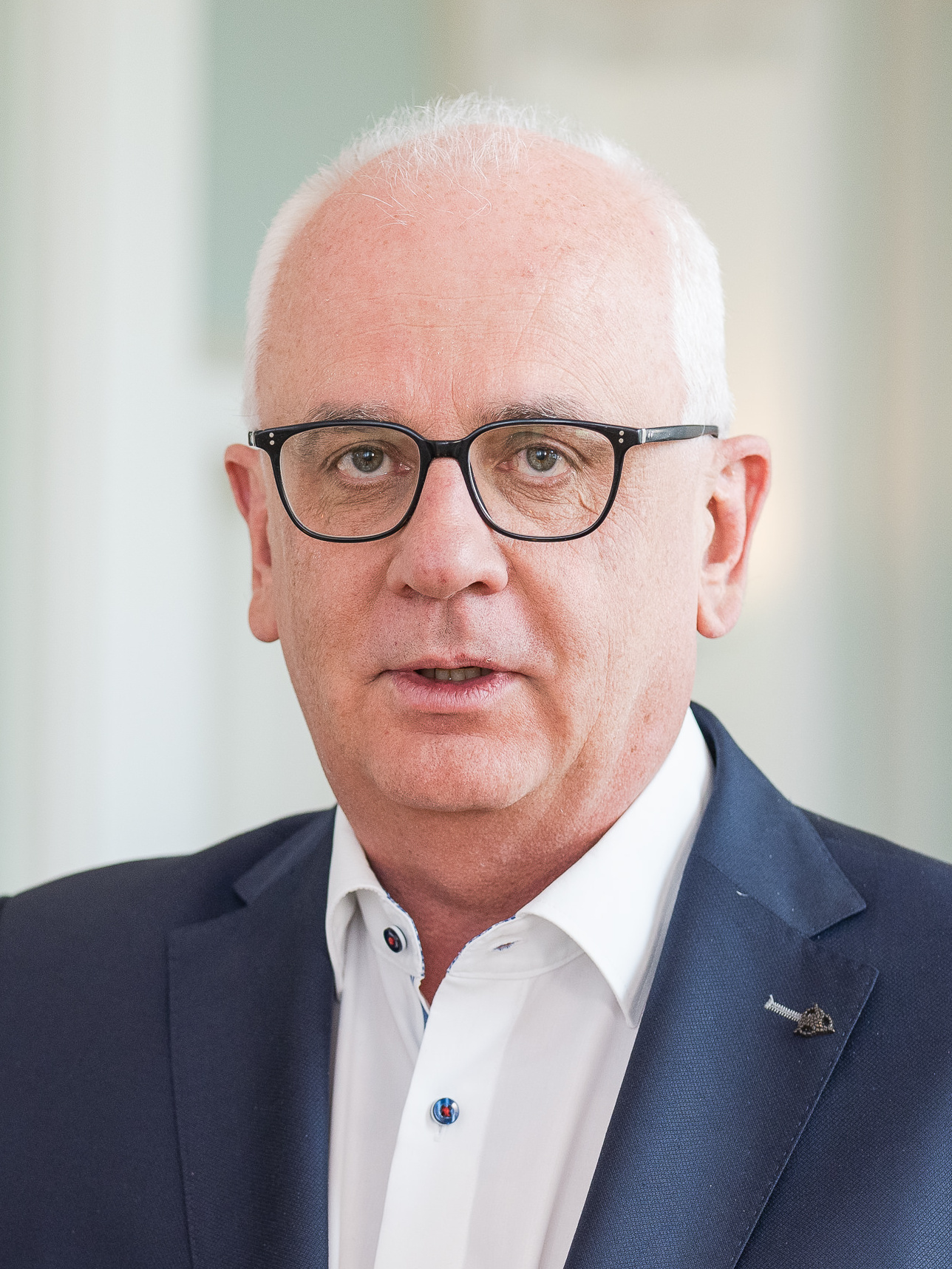
Daniel Hilti, incumbent mayor of Schaan

The mayor of Schaan is the head of the Schaan municipal government. The role has existed since the introduction of the Liechtenstein municipal law of 1864.

The incumbent mayor is Daniel Hilti, since 2003.

== List of mayors (1864–present) ==
List of mayorsList of mayors (1864–present)
No. (Note: People are numbered according to periods served by the same person. For example, Josef Tschetter served as mayor on two non-consecutive terms, but is counted only once.)	Name	Term	Party	Ref(s).
1	Johann Baptist Quaderer	1864–1870	—	
2	Ferdinand Walser	1870–1873	—	
3	Jakob Wagner	1873–1876	—	
4	Josef Tschetter	1876–1879	—	
(2)	Ferdinand Walser	1879–1880	—	
5	Julius Wagner	1880–1884	—	
(4)	Josef Tschetter	1884–1888	—	
6	Josef Beck	1888–1894	—	
7	Ferdinand Walser	1894–1900	—	
8	Jakob Falk	1900–1903	—	
(7)	Ferdinand Walser	1903–1909	—	
8	Fritz Walser	1909–1912	—	
9	Josef Beck	1912–1915	—	
(7)	Fritz Walser	1915–1918	—	
8	Edmund Risch	1918–1924	FBP	
9	Johann Hilti	1924–1927	FBP	
10	Ferdinand Risch	1927–1940	FBP	
11	Josef Schierscher	1940–1942	FBP	
12	Tobias Jehle	1942–1957	FBP	
13	Ludwig Beck	1957–1969	VU	
14	Walter Beck	1969–1979	FBP	
15	Lorenz Schierscher	1979–1991	FBP	
16	Hansjakob Falk	1991–2003	FBP	
17	Daniel Hilti	2003–present	VU	

== See also ==
- Schaan
