= 1939 Liechtenstein local elections =

← 1936	12 February 1939	1942 →
- Mayoral results by municipality

Local elections were held in Liechtenstein on 12 February 1939 to elect the municipal councils and the mayors of the eleven municipalities.

== Results ==
=== Summary ===
Party	Mayors
Progressive Citizens' Party	8
Patriotic Union	3
Total	11
Source: Liechtensteiner Volksblatt

=== By municipality ===
Municipality	Party	Votes	Elected mayor
Balzers	Patriotic Union	241	Alois Wille
Eschen	Progressive Citizens' Party	204	Josef Meier
Gamprin	Patriotic Union		Josef Marxer
Mauren	Progressive Citizens' Party		David Meier
Planken	Progressive Citizens' Party	26	Gustav Jehle
Ruggell	Progressive Citizens' Party	46	Josef Öhri
Schaan	Progressive Citizens' Party	216	Ferdinand Risch
Schellenberg	Progressive Citizens' Party		Philipp Elkuch
Triesen	Patriotic Union	216	Ferdinand Heidegger
Triesenberg	Progressive Citizens' Party	68	Johann Beck
Vaduz	Progressive Citizens' Party	46	Ludwig Ospelt
Source: Liechtensteiner Volksblatt
