= Hilti (surname) =

Hilti is a surname. Notable people with the surname include:

- Daniel Hilti (born 1965), Liechtenstein politician
- Diana Hilti (born 1973), Liechtenstein politician
- Eugen Hilti (1911–1964), Liechtenstein entrepreneur and industrialist, founder of Hilti Corporation
- Gottfried Hilti (1903–1977), Liechtenstein sculptor and politician
- Hubert Hilti (born 1963), Liechtenstein alpine skier
- Johann Hilti (1885–1955), Liechtenstein politician, mayor of Schaan
- Jonas Hilti (born 2000), Liechtensteiner footballer
- Martin Hilti (1915–1997), Liechtenstein entrepreneur and industrialist, founder of Hilti Corporation
- Peter Hilti (born 1972), Liechtenstein politician
- Toni Hilti (1914–2006), Liechtenstein entrepreneur and industrialist, cofounder of Hilcona food processing company

== See also ==
- Hilti
- Hilty
