= Batliner (surname) =

Batliner is a surname. Notable people with the name include:

- Alexander Batliner (born 1967), Liechtenstein politician
- Bartholomäus Batliner (1842–1912), Liechtenstein businessman
- Emil Batliner (1869–1947), Liechtenstein businessman and politician
- Fiona Batliner (born 2003), Liechtenstein footballer
- Gerard Batliner (1928–2008), Prime Minister of Liechtenstein
- Manfred Batliner (born 1963), Liechtenstein businessman and politician
- Thomas Batliner (born 1959), Liechtenstein equestrian
