= 1921 Liechtenstein local elections =

- 21 April 1921

Local elections were held in Liechtenstein on 21 April 1921 to elect the municipal councils and the mayors of the eleven municipalities. They were the first local elections contested by political parties.

== Results ==
=== Summary ===
Party	Mayors
Progressive Citizens' Party	7
Christian-Social People's Party	4
Total	11
Source: Liechtensteiner Volksblatt

=== By municipality ===
Municipality	Party	Elected mayor
Balzers	Progressive Citizens' Party	Gebhard Brunhart
Eschen	Progressive Citizens' Party	Josef Marxer
Gamprin	Progressive Citizens' Party	Wilhelm Büchel
Mauren	Christian-Social People's Party	Rudolf Matt
Planken	Progressive Citizens' Party	Ferdinand Beck
Ruggell	Christian-Social People's Party	Johann Büchel
Schaan	Progressive Citizens' Party	Edmund Risch
Schellenberg	Progressive Citizens' Party	Karl Kaiser
Triesen	Christian-Social People's Party	Emil Bargetze
Triesenberg	Christian-Social People's Party	Josef Gassner
Vaduz	Progressive Citizens' Party	Josef Gassner
Source: Liechtensteiner Volksblatt
