= Franz Xaver Hoop =

Liechtenstein politician (1886–1960)

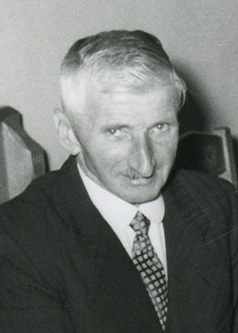
- Hoop in 1949

Liechtenstein government councillor
- In office 3 September 1945 – 9 July 1953
- Preceded by: Anton Frommelt
- Succeeded by: Josef Meier

Member of the Landtag of Liechtenstein for Unterland
- In office 10 January 1926 – 6 February 1949

Mayor of Ruggell
- In office 1930–1939
- Preceded by: Johann Büchel
- Succeeded by: Josef Öhri

Personal details
- Born: 5 September 1886 Ruggell, Liechtenstein
- Died: 2 November 1960 (aged 74) Ruggell, Liechtenstein
- Party: Progressive Citizens' Party
- Spouse: Barbara Näscher (m. 1916)
- Children: 6

Franz Xaver Hoop (5 September 1886 – 2 November 1960) was a politician from Liechtenstein who served in the Landtag of Liechtenstein from 1926 to 1949. He also served as the mayor of Ruggell from 1930 to 1939.

== Life ==
Hoop was born on 5 September 1886 in Ruggell as the son of Landtag member Franz Josef Hoop and Maria (née Öhri) as one of five children. He worked as a farmer.

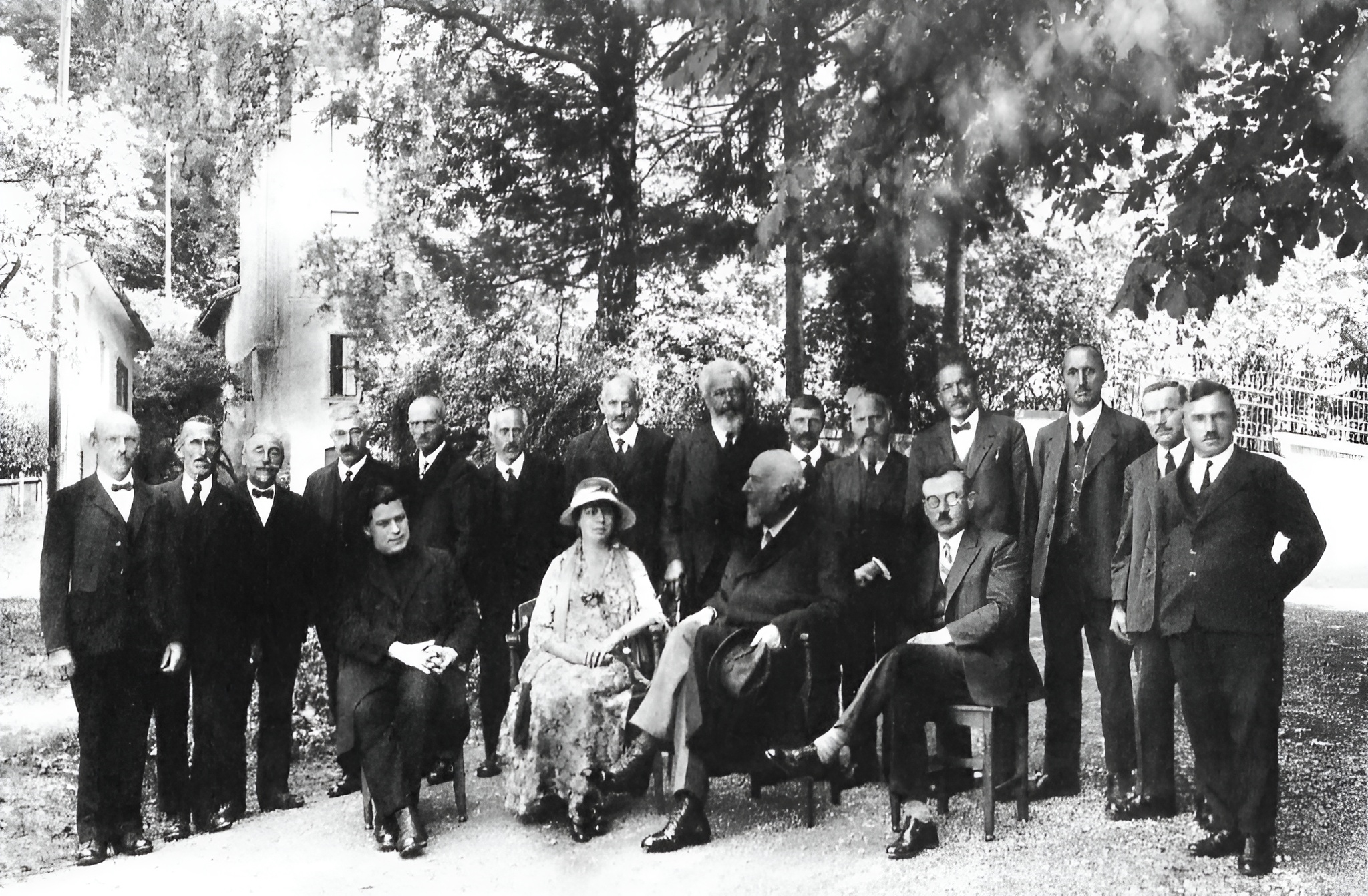
Hoop (back, sixth from right) with members of the Landtag and Franz I in 1931

From 1924 to 1927 and again from 1942 to 1945 Hoop was a member of the Ruggell municipal council as a member of the Progressive Citizens' Party (FBP), and from 1930 to 1939 he was the mayor of the muncipality. From January 1926 to 1949 he was a member of the Landtag of Liechtenstein. During this time, he was a member of the Landtag's state, finance and audit committees.

Hoop played a role in gathering support for the building of the Liechtenstein inland canal through Ruggell and was one of the proponents of the 1932 electoral system referendum. He was an opponent of Nazi elements within Liechtenstein.

From 3 September 1945 to 9 July 1953 Hoop served as a government councillor, under the government of Alexander Frick.

Hoop married Barbara Näscher (12 December 1893 – 5 November 1975) on 13 November 1916 and they had six children together. He died of a serious illness on 2 November 1960, aged 74.

== Bibliography ==
- Vogt, Paul (1987). 125 Jahre Landtag (in German). Vaduz: Landtag of the Principality of Liechtenstein.
