= Hilty =

Hilty is a surname of Swiss German origin. It is derived from the diminutive form of the name Hildebrand. Notable people with the surname include:

- Augustin Hilty (1896–1955), Liechtenstein sports shooter
- Bill Hilty (born 1928), American politician
- Carl Hilty (1833–1909), Swiss lawyer and philosopher
- Joan Hilty (born 1966), American cartoonist, educator, and comic book editor
- Leonard Hilty (1896–1978), American football player
- Lorenz Hilty, Swiss computer scientist and author
- Megan Hilty (born 1981), American musical theatre actress
- Patrick Hilty (born 1954), Liechtenstein accountant and politician

== See also ==
- Hilti
