= Edmund Risch =

Mayor of Schaan from 1918 to 1924

Mayor of Schaan
- In office 1918–1924
- Preceded by: Fritz Walser
- Succeeded by: Johann Hilti

Personal details
- Born: 15 November 1862 Schaan, Liechtenstein
- Died: 13 October 1937 (aged 74) Schaan, Liechtenstein
- Party: Progressive Citizens' Party
- Spouse: Karolina Wanger (m. 1897)
- Children: 4

Edmund Risch (15 November 1862 – 13 October 1937) was a farmer and politician who served as the Mayor of Schaan from 1918 to 1924.

== Life ==
Risch was born on 15 November 1862 in Schaan as the son of Lorenz Risch and Barbara (née Walser) as one of four children. He worked as a farmer.

From 1984 to 1900 he was the debt collection commissioner. He was a member of the Schaan municipal council from 1900 to 1915, and also the administrator of the Schaan poor house from 1908 to 1918 before becoming the Mayor of Schaan in 1918, where he served until 1924 as a member of the Progressive Citizens' Party (FBP). In the 1932 elections, Risch was nominated by the Christian-Social People's Party (VP) for a seat in the Landtag of Liechtenstein for the Schaan municipality, but was defeated by Ferdinand Risch of the FBP.

Risch married Karolina Wanger (28 January 1872 – 15 March 1958), the daughter of former mayor Jakob Wanger, on 22 February 1897 and they had five children together. He died on 13 October 1937, aged 74. His son Ernst Risch served in the Landtag.

== Bibliography ==
- Vogt, Paul (1987). 125 Jahre Landtag (in German). Vaduz: Landtag of the Principality of Liechtenstein.
