= 1924 Liechtenstein local elections =

- May 1924

Local elections were held in Liechtenstein in May 1924 to elect the municipal councils and the mayors of the eleven municipalities.

== Results ==
=== Summary ===
Party	Mayors
Progressive Citizens' Party	9
Christian-Social People's Party	2
Total	11
Source: Oberrheinische Nachrichten

=== By municipality ===
Municipality	Party	Elected mayor
Balzers	Progressive Citizens' Party	Gebhard Brunhart
Eschen	Progressive Citizens' Party	Josef Marxer
Gamprin	Progressive Citizens' Party	Wilhelm Büchel
Mauren	Progressive Citizens' Party	Emil Batliner
Planken	Progressive Citizens' Party	Ferdinand Beck
Ruggell	Christian-Social People's Party	Johann Büchel
Schaan	Progressive Citizens' Party	Johann Hilti
Schellenberg	Progressive Citizens' Party	Karl Kaiser
Triesen	Progressive Citizens' Party	Emil Risch
Triesenberg	Christian-Social People's Party	Alois Schädler
Vaduz	Progressive Citizens' Party	Josef Gassner
Source: Oberrheinische Nachrichten
