= 1976 Liechtenstein Vaduz bypass referendum =

- 19 September 1976
- Referendum on building a bypass for Vaduz and Schaan

Results
Choice	Votes	%
Yes	746	19.77%
No	3,027	80.23%
Valid votes	3,773	97.72%
Invalid or blank votes	88	2.28%
Total votes	3,861	100.00%
Registered voters/turnout	4,762	81.08%

A referendum on building a bypass for Vaduz and Schaan was held in Liechtenstein on 19 September 1976. The proposal was rejected by 80.2% of voters.

== Results ==
Choice	Votes	%
For	746	19.8
Against	3,027	80.2
Invalid/blank votes	88	–
Total	3,861	100
Registered voters/turnout	4,762	81.1
Source: Nohlen & Stöver
