= Alois Schädler =

Liechtenstein industrialist and politician (1878–1964)

Liechtenstein government councillor
- In office 28 February 1936 – 30 March 1938
- Prime Minister: Josef Hoop
- Preceded by: Josef Steger
- Succeeded by: Arnold Hoop

Mayor of Triesenberg
- In office 1924–1930
- Preceded by: Josef Gassner
- Succeeded by: Heinrich Beck

Personal details
- Born: 5 November 1878 Triesenberg, Liechtenstein
- Died: 10 February 1964 (aged 85) Triesenberg, Liechtenstein
- Party: Patriotic Union (from 1936); Christian-Social People's Party (before 1936)
- Spouse: Antonia Hilbe (m. 1903; died 1948)
- Children: 8

Alois Schädler (5 November 1878 – 10 February 1964) was an industrialist, architect, and politician from Liechtenstein who served as a government councillor from 1936 to 1938. A member of the Christian-Social People's Party (VP) and later the Patriotic Union (VU), he previously served as the mayor of Triesenberg from 1924 to 1930.

== Life ==
Schädler was born on 5 November 1878 in Triesenberg as the son of Johann Schädler and Seraphine (née Eberle) as one of three children. He initially worked as a plasterer in Germany and Switzerland before becoming a building contractor in Triesenberg, and also operated embroidery machines and electric sawmill from 1914, which supplied electricity.

He was an early supporter of the opposition group around Wilhelm Beck, and served in the Triesenberg municipal council from 1915 to 1924, and also as deputy mayor the municipality from 1918 to 1924 as a member of the Christian-Social People's Party (VP). Schädler was mayor of the municipality from 1924 to 1930, and a judge at the high court from 1922 to 1930. He was president of the VP from 1931 until its merging with the Liechtenstein Homeland Service to form the Patriotic Union (VU) in 1936.

Following the 1936 elections, the opposition Progressive Citizens' Party (FBP) agreed to elect Schädler as a government councillor as a peace gesture, under the government of Josef Hoop. He served in this position until 1938, when he voluntarily resigned as part of the VU and FBP forming a coalition government. Schädler was active against the activities of Nazi elements in Liechtenstein, and was the chairman of the Liechtenstein Loyalty Association from 1939 to 1940, a nonpartisan designed to oppose the activities of the German National Movement in Liechtenstein.

He was a substitute judge at the Liechtenstein state court from 1948 to 1959, and was conductor of the Triesenberg Brass Band from 1910 to 1937.

Schädler married Antonia Hilbe (21 September 1880 – 28 October 1948) on 9 February 1903 and they had eight children together. He died on 10 February 1964, aged 85.

== Bibliography ==
- Geiger, Peter (1997). Liechtenstein in den Dreissigerjahren 1928–1939 [Liechtenstein in the 1930s 1928–1939] (in German). Vol. 1. Zürich: Liechtenstein Institute, Chronos Verlag. ISBN 3-906393-28-3.
