= 1942 Liechtenstein local elections =

← 1939	30 March 1942	1945 →
- Mayoral results by municipality

Local elections were held in Liechtenstein on 30 March 1942 to elect the municipal councils and the mayors of the eleven municipalities.

== Results ==
=== Summary ===
Party	Mayors
Progressive Citizens' Party	8
Patriotic Union	3
Total	11
Source: Liechtensteiner Volksblatt

=== By municipality ===
Municipality	Party	Votes	Elected mayor
Balzers	Patriotic Union	243	Alois Wille
Eschen	Progressive Citizens' Party	152	Josef Meier
Gamprin	Patriotic Union	54	Josef Marxer
Mauren	Progressive Citizens' Party	147	David Meier
Planken	Progressive Citizens' Party	14	Gustav Jehle
Ruggell	Progressive Citizens' Party	83	Josef Öhri
Schaan	Progressive Citizens' Party	192	Tobias Jehle
Schellenberg	Progressive Citizens' Party	46	Philipp Elkuch
Triesen	Patriotic Union	128	Ferdinand Heidegger
Triesenberg	Progressive Citizens' Party	140	Johann Beck
Vaduz	Progressive Citizens' Party	171	David Strub
Source: Liechtensteiner Volksblatt
