= Johann Schädler (politician) =

Liechtenstein politician (1875–1953)

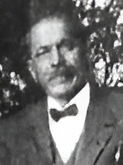
- Schädler in 1931

Member of the Landtag of Liechtenstein for Oberland
- In office 16 March 1930 – 6 March 1932

Personal details
- Born: 4 December 1875 Triesenberg, Liechtenstein
- Died: 12 February 1953 (aged 77) Triesenberg, Liechtenstein
- Political party: Progressive Citizens' Party
- Spouse(s): Benedikta Lampert (m. 1897–1919) Hedwig Sele (m. 1919)
- Children: 4

Johann Schädler (4 December 1875 – 12 February 1953) was a politician from Liechtenstein who served in the Landtag of Liechtenstein from 1930 to 1932.

He worked as a farmer and plasterer. He was a member of the Triesenberg municipal council from 1912 to 1915 and then municipal treasurer of Triesenberg from 1915 to 1921. From 1928 to 1945 he was a judge at the VBI. In 1930, he was the only member of the Landtag to vote against the building of the Liechtenstein inland canal.

== Bibliography ==
- Vogt, Paul (1987). 125 Jahre Landtag (in German). Vaduz: Landtag of the Principality of Liechtenstein.
