= Rudolf Matt =

Liechtenstein politician (1877–1960)

Member of the Landtag of Liechtenstein for Unterland
- In office 4 April 1939 – 29 April 1945
- In office 5 February 1922 – 10 January 1926

Mayor of Mauren
- In office 1921–1924
- Preceded by: Andreas Meier
- Succeeded by: Emil Batliner

Personal details
- Born: 21 April 1877 Mauren, Liechtenstein
- Died: 26 July 1960 (aged 83) Mauren, Liechtenstein
- Party: Patriotic Union (from 1936); Christian-Social People's Party (before 1936)
- Spouse: Zäzilla Anna Lingg (m. 1905)
- Children: 6

Rudolf Matt (21 April 1877 – 26 July 1960) was a politician from Liechtenstein who served in the Landtag of Liechtenstein from 1922 to 1926 and again from 1939 to 1945. He previously served as Mayor of Mauren from 1921 to 1924.

== Life ==
Matt was born on 21 April 1877 in Mauren as the son of Johann Jakob and Carolina (née Ritter) as one of ten children. He conducted an apprenticeship in Feldkirch then worked in Schaan before traveling to Munich, Zurich and Mannheim. He returned to Liechtenstein around 1900, where he became a locksmith and farmer in Mauren.

From 1915 to 1918 he was the municipal treasurer of Mauren. He was Mayor of Mauren from 1921 to 1924 as a member of the Christian-Social People's Party. In 1922, he won a defamation case against the Liechtensteiner Volksblatt. He was a member of the state school board from 1922 to 1928.

He was elected to the Landtag of Liechtenstein in 1922, where he served until 1926. He was again elected to the Landtag in the 1939 elections as a member of the Patriotic Union as a part of the unified list between the party and the Progressive Citizens' Party for the formation of a coalition government, where he served until 1945. During this time, he was a member of the Landtag's finance and state committees. He was a judge at the Liechtenstein administrative appeals court from 1936 to 1949.

Matt married Zäzilla Anna Lingg (23 May 1876 – 22 June 1961) on 20 November 1905 and they had six children together. He died from an unspecified illness on 26 July 1960 in Mauren, aged 83.

== Bibliography ==
- Vogt, Paul (1987). 125 Jahre Landtag (in German). Vaduz: Landtag of the Principality of Liechtenstein.
