= Liechtenstein inland canal =

Artificial water stream in Liechtenstein

Coordinates: 47°08′11.8″N 9°30′55.6″E

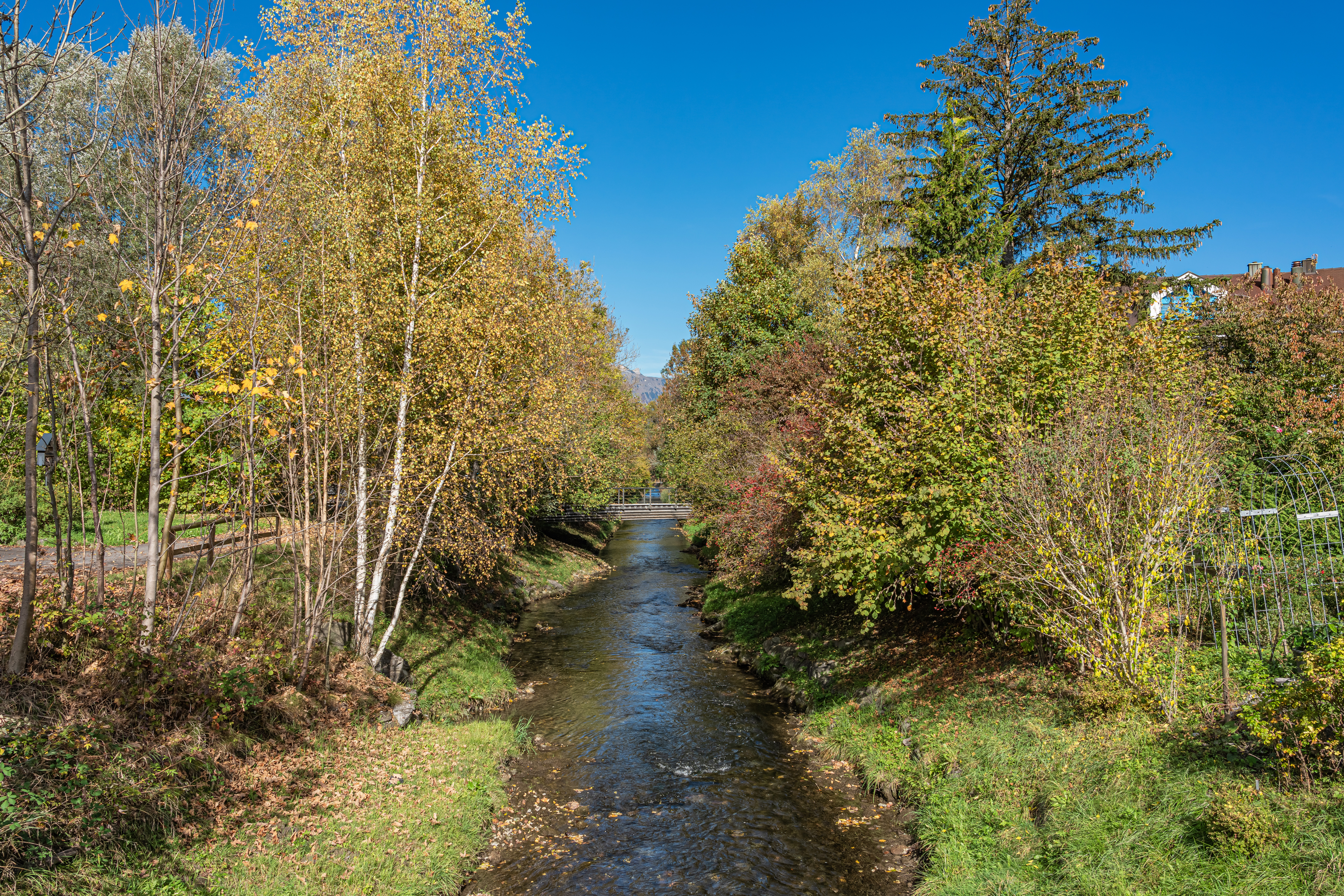
A view of the Liechtenstein inland canal in Vaduz.

The inland canal (German: Binnenkanal) in Liechtenstein is a 23 km (14 mi) long artificial stream of water created between 1931 and 1943. The canal receives water from twelve Alpine streams and flows into the Alpine Rhine near the country's northern end. It is considered one of the most significant constructions in the country.

== History ==
Franz Joseph II and Princess Gina at the ground-breaking ceremony on 3 April 1943. Film by Adolf Buck

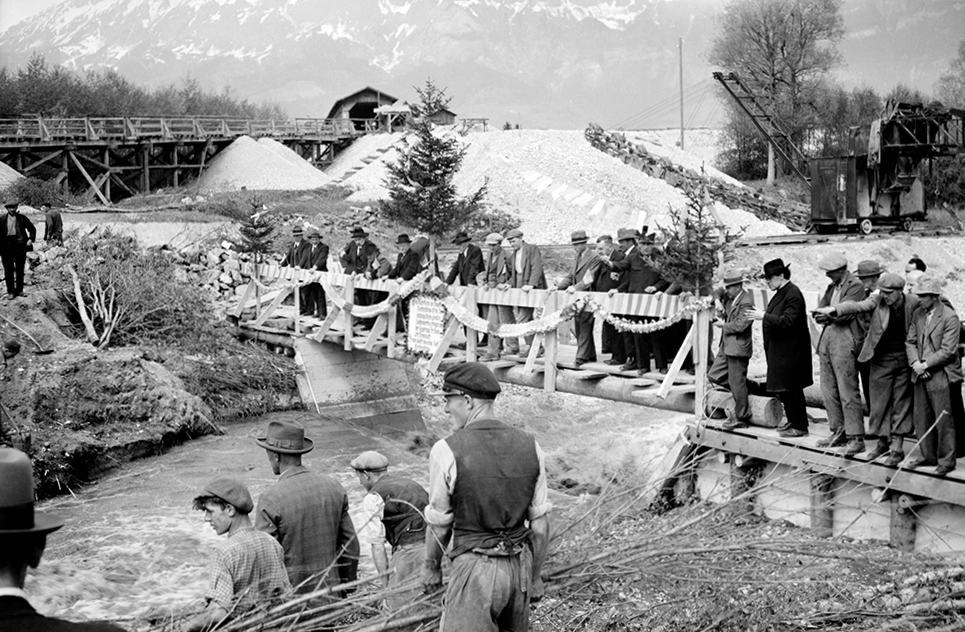
Celebration of the opening of the Liechtenstein canal in April 1943. (Note: The plaque on the bridge reads "A milestone in Liechtenstein's work is the completion of this great national project. Built under the government of Dr. Hoop & Rev. Frommelt. That's why the people of Liechtenstein thank them.")

Plans to build an inland canal in Liechtenstein date back to the 18th-century due to increased waterlogging of the river and the restricted flow of streams in the Alpine valley. In 1834 a canal was built between Schaan and Bendern in order to address this, but there was no permanent drainage into the connecting Rhine river. In 1894, the proposal for a inland canal extensively flowing through the country was first brought up for discussion in the Landtag of Liechtenstein. After six years of reports, the plan was first adopted by engineer Josef Vogt based on the design of Austrian engineer Philipp Krapf, but was not conducted due to huge costs.

Under the initiative of the government of Josef Hoop and politician Ferdinand Risch, the Landtag accepted the proposal for the building of the canal on 7 July 1930 (Note: The Landtag vote passed 14–1, with Johann Schädler being the only member to vote against.) and then it was approved following a referendum on the topic on 14 December of the same year. The canal was part of a wider initiative by Hoop's government to combat the effects of the Great Depression and was intended to provide construction jobs in addition to bringing additional arable land into Liechtenstein in order to increase farming and thus more employment to the country.

The construction was conducted in various stages while several subsidiary canals were built to support it. The canal was officially completed on 3 April 1943 and the ground-breaking ceremony was conducted by Franz Joseph II and Countess Georgina von Wilczek. The total cost of the canal equated to 4.6 million Swiss francs (approximately 21.7 million in 2024).

Since 1984, the Liechtenstein government has conducted several revitalization projects of the canal and in 2000 the canal's mouth into the Rhine was redesigned into a natural formation.

== See also ==
- Geography of Liechtenstein
