= Peter Frick =

Liechtenstein politician (born 1965)

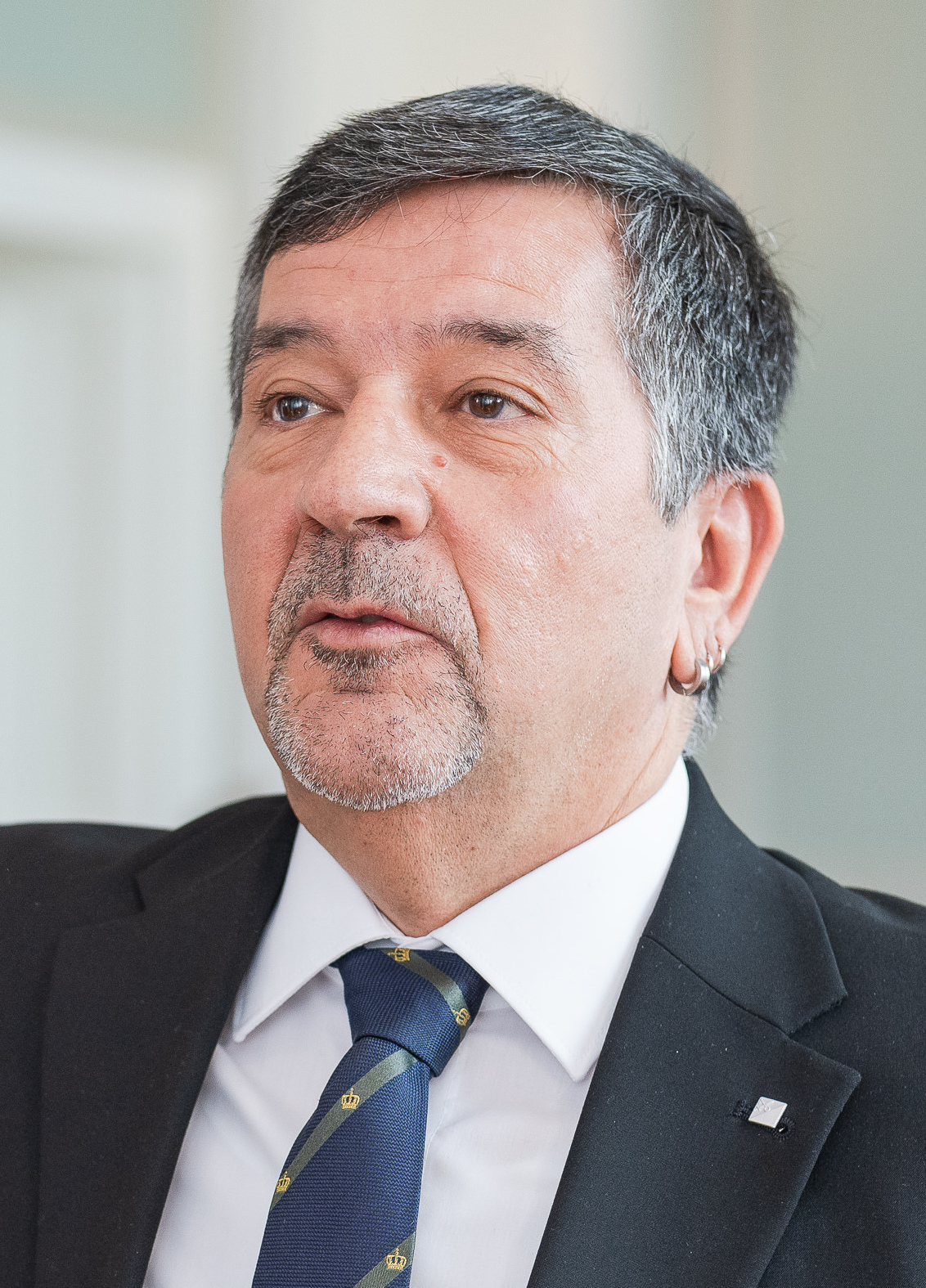
- Frick in 2023

Member of the Landtag of Liechtenstein for Unterland
- In office 7 February 2021 – 9 February 2025

Mayor of Mauren
- Incumbent
- Assumed office 1 May 2023
- Preceded by: Freddy Kaiser

Personal details
- Born: 29 November 1965 (age 60) Walenstadt, Switzerland
- Party: Patriotic Union
- Spouse: Nadine Batliner (m. 2001)
- Children: 3

Peter Frick (born 29 November 1965) is a politician from Liechtenstein who served in the Landtag of Liechtenstein from 2021 to 2025. He has also served as the mayor of Mauren since 2023.

== Life ==
Frick was born on 29 November 1965 in Walenstadt as the son of Ernst Frick and Anna Della Ripa as one of six children. He attended primary school in Ebenholz, and the secondary school in Vaduz. He studied social work at the Eastern Switzerland University of Applied Sciences in St. Gallen from 1999 to 2003, where he received a diploma in social pedagogy.

From 1981 to 1999 he worked as a postman at Liechtensteinische Post, then as a social worker at the Pipoltr youth center in Triesenberg from 1999 to 2006. He worked as a social worker at the Werdenberg Social Services in Buchs from 2009 to 2017 and then at the Unterland School Center in Eschen from 2017 to 2023. Since 1999, he has been a member of the Liechtenstein civil protection service and also the head of the operations group for the state command area at the office for civil protection since 2004. He was a member of the Liechtenstein crisis intervention team from 2008 to 2023.

Frick has been a board member of the Patriotic Union since 2017. From 2017 to 2021 he was a deputy member of the Landtag of Liechtenstein and a member of Liechtenstein's delegation to the European Economic Area. From 2021 to 2025, he was a full member of the Landtag, and a member of the Liechtenstein delegation to the Parliamentary Assembly of the Council of Europe. Since 2023, Frick has served as the mayor of Mauren. He was the first candidate belonging to the Patriotic Union to contest the Mauren mayoral election since 1991 and also the first mayor of the municipality belonging to the party.

Frick married Nadine Batliner (born 1 March 1971) on 22 June 2001 and they have three children together. He previously lived in Balzers, before moving to Mauren in 2018.
