= Maria Grabher-Meyer =

Liechtensteiner poet and short story writer (1898–1970)

Maria Grabher-Meyer (née Kaufmann; 10 January 1898 – 2 November 1970) was a Liechtensteiner poet and short story writer.

== Early life and family ==
Grabher-Meyer was born in 1898 in Schaan, Liechtenstein. Her parents were Albert Kaufmann and Josepha Kaufmann (née Grabher) and she had five siblings. She trained as a substitute teacher and moved to Austria. Grabher-Meyer married Austrian Josef Grabher-Meyer and they had three children together. They were married in 1920 in Vorarlberg, Austria.

== Career ==
Grabher-Meyer wrote poems and short stories based on the memories of her youth in Liechtenstein. Her poems were published in newspapers, including in the Vorarlberger Volkskalender. In 1950 and 1951, two editions of Grabher-Meyer's short story collection Dorf meiner Kindheit (Village of My Childhood) were published.

Grabher-Meyer also contributed to Liechtensteiner and Austrian school textbooks.

== Death ==
Grabher-Meyer died on 2 November 1970 in Vorarlberg, Austria.
