= Oswald Bühler =

Liechtenstein politician (1899–1962)

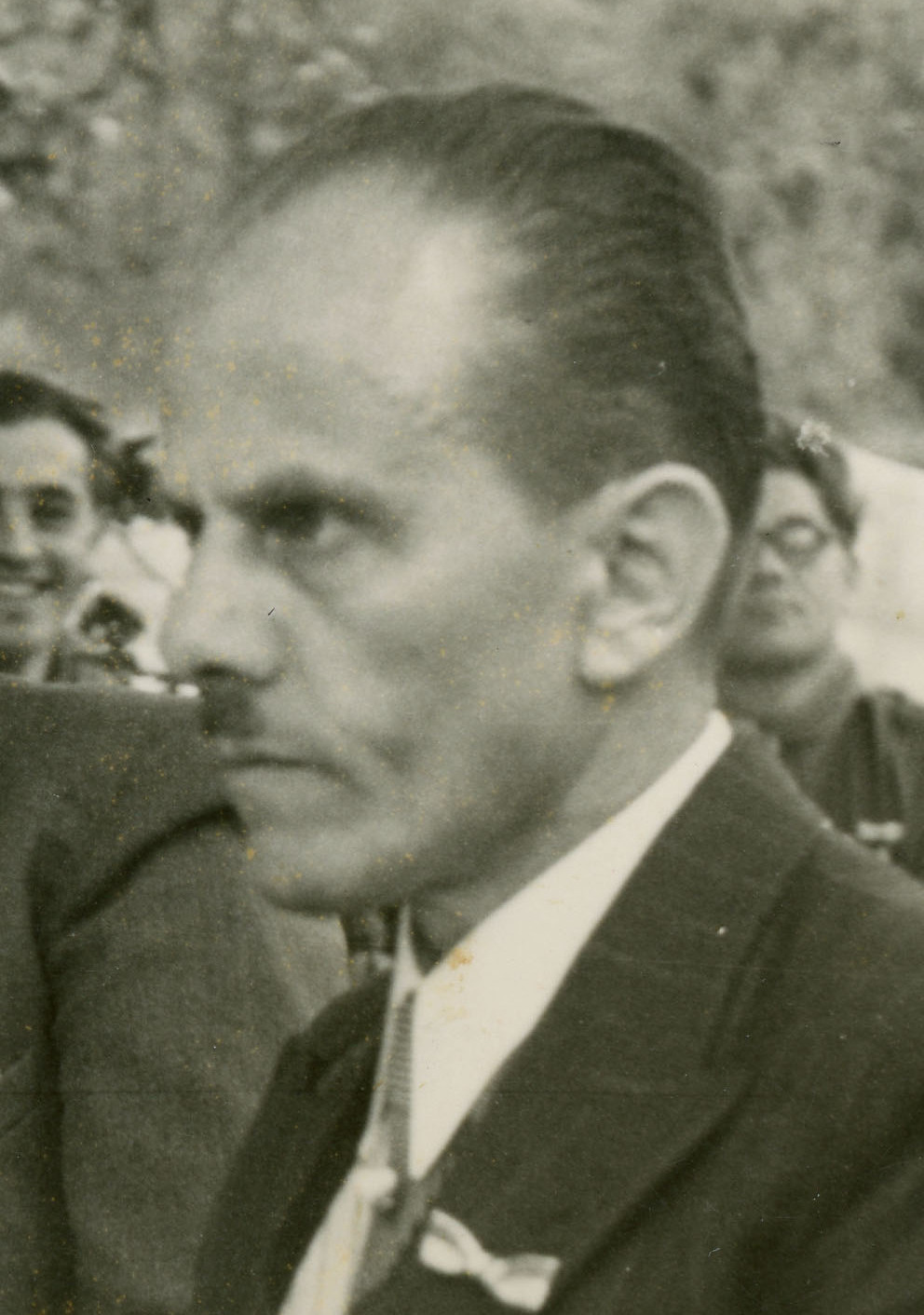
- Bühler in 1954

Member of the Landtag of Liechtenstein for Unterland
- In office 6 February 1949 – 1 September 1957
- In office 4 April 1939 – 29 April 1945

Mayor of Mauren
- In office 1948 – 8 December 1962
- Deputy: Egon Meier
- Preceded by: David Meier
- Succeeded by: Egon Meier

Personal details
- Born: 2 March 1899 Mauren, Liechtenstein
- Died: 8 December 1962 (aged 63) Grabs, Switzerland
- Party: Progressive Citizens' Party
- Spouse: Olivia Maria Matt (m. 1930)
- Children: 3
- Parent(s): David Bühler; Wilhelmine Marock

Oswald Bühler (2 March 1899 – 8 December 1962) was a lawyer and politician from Liechtenstein who served in the Landtag of Liechtenstein from 1939 to 1945 and again from 1949 to 1957. He also served as the mayor of Mauren from 1948 until his death in 1962.

== Career ==
Bühler was born on 2 March 1899 in Mauren as the son of accountant David Bühler and Wilhelmine Marock as one of four children. In 1918, he joined the Progressive Citizens' Party and from 1936 to 1939 he was a member of the Mauren municipal council. Throughout the 1930s, he as a prominent opponent of fascist elements within Liechtenstein, such as the Liechtenstein Homeland Service and German National Movement in Liechtenstein. At some point, Bühler took over his father's legal firm.

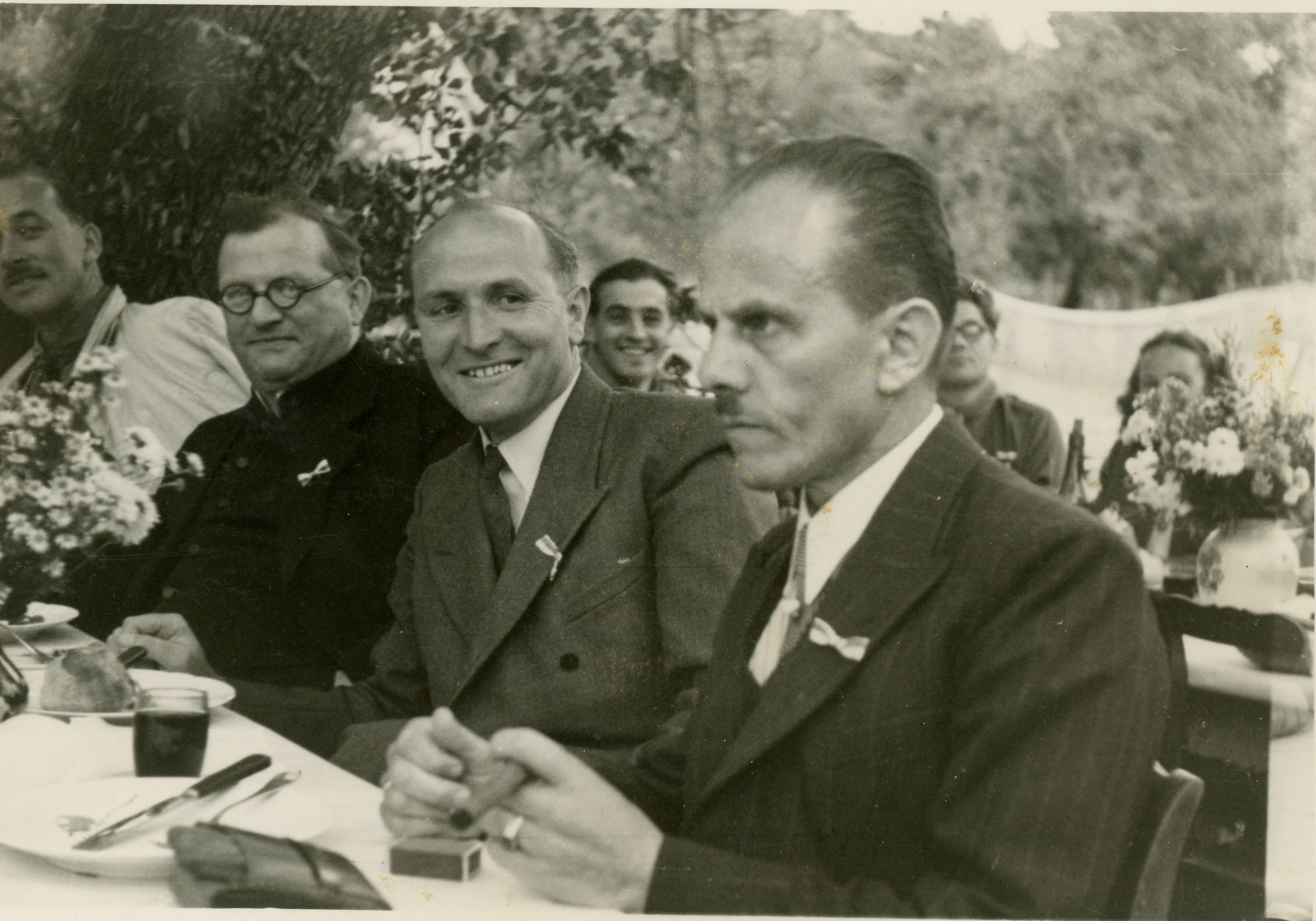
Bühler (right) with Alexander Frick and Prince Emanuel of Liechtenstein at a music festival in Mauren in June 1954.

He was elected to the Landtag of Liechtenstein in 1939 as a member of the Progressive Citizens' Party as a part of the unified list between the party and the Patriotic Union for the formation of a coalition government. He was then a deputy member of the Landtag from 1945, before being re-elected again in 1949, where he served until 1957. During this time, he was also a member of the Landtag's state committee, the finance committee and the audit committee. In addition, he was Mayor of Mauren from 1948 to 1962, where he is credited with expanding the road services, the rapid industrialisation of the municipality and the building of a new community hall in 1950.

In 1935, he founded a textile factory in Eschen and from 1928 to 1955 he was a member of the board of directors of the Sparkassen-Finanzgruppe and National Bank of Liechtenstein, as well as at the VP Bank from 1956 to 1962. He was also a member of the board at the Liechtenstein Red Cross from 1953 until his death in 1962.

== Personal life and death ==
Bühler married Olivia Maria Matt (4 July 1901 – 23 December 1985) on 13 May 1930 and they had three children together. He died in the hospital in Grabs, Switzerland as a result of a hunting accident on 8 December 1962, aged 63 years old.

== Bibliography ==
- Vogt, Paul (1987). 125 Jahre Landtag (in German). Vaduz: Landtag of the Principality of Liechtenstein.
