= List of mayors of Mauren =

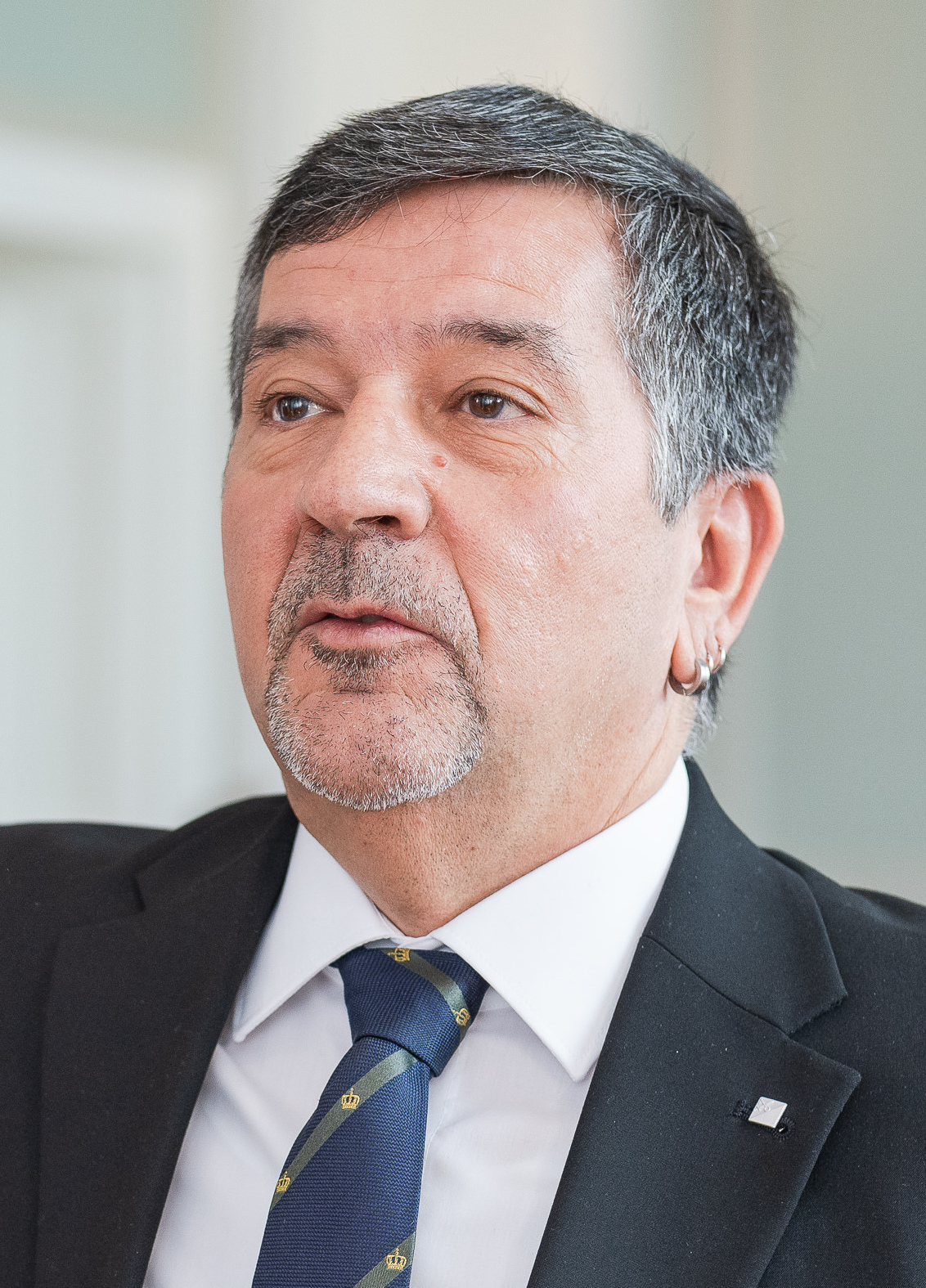
Peter Frick, incumbent mayor of Mauren

The mayor of Mauren is the head of the Mauren municipal government. The role has existed since the introduction of the Liechtenstein municipal law of 1864.

The incumbent mayor is Peter Frick, since 2023.

== List of mayors (1864–present) ==
List of mayorsList of mayors (1864–present)
No. (Note: People are numbered according to periods served by the same person. For example, Jakob Kaiser served as mayor in four non-consecutive terms, but is counted only once.)	Name	Term	Party	Ref(s).
1	Johann Georg Matt	1864–1867	—	
2	Johann Georg Matt	1867–1870	—	
3	Simon Fehr	1870–1873	—	
4	Korbinian Meier	1873–1874	—	
5	Michael Kaiser	1874–1876	—	
6	Mathias Frick	1876–1879	—	
(5)	Michael Kaiser	1879–1879	—	
7	Jakob Kaiser	1879–1882	—	
(6)	Mathias Frick	1882–1885	—	
(7)	Jakob Kaiser	1885–1888	—	
8	Medard Ritter	1888–1891	—	
(7)	Jakob Kaiser	1891–1897	—	
(8)	Medard Ritter	1897–1900	—	
(7)	Jakob Kaiser	1900–1903	—	
9	Franz Josef Ritter	1903–1909	—	
10	Emil Batliner	1909–1918	—	
11	Andreas Meier	1918–1921	FBP	
12	Rudolf Matt	1921–1924	CSVP	
(10)	Emil Batliner	1924–1930	FBP	
13	David Bühler	1930–1933	FBP	
14	David Meier	1933–1948	FBP	
15	Oswald Bühler	1948–1962	FBP	
16	Egon Meier	1962–1969	FBP	
17	Werner Matt	1969–1979	FBP	
18	Hartwig Kieber	1979–1991	FBP	
19	Johannes Kaiser	1991–2003	FBP	
20	Freddy Kaiser	2003–2023	FBP	
21	Peter Frick	2023–	VU	

== See also ==
- Mauren
