= Fort Schaan =

Roman fortification in Liechtenstein

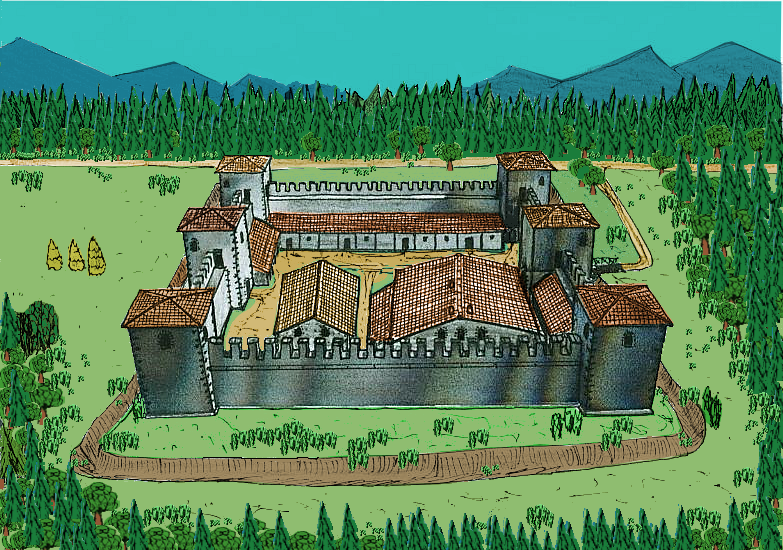
A reconstruction of what the fort would have looked like when it was freshly built

Fort Schaan, also called Kastell Schaan or Kleinkastell Schaan, is a Roman fortification in the municipality of Schaan, in the principality of Liechtenstein. The fortification was built in the 4th century AD, during Rome's “taming” of the area. The fort was built along a major military road linking Milan, Italy, to Bregenz, Austria.

== Description ==
Fort Schaan wasn't a perfect square, and was more of a quadrangle. The fort had one tower at each corner and one tower in the middle of the North and South walls between the corners, called intermediate towers. The towers and curtain walls were constructed out of limestone, a common stone found nearby. Sand from the nearby Rhine was used as mortar to keep the limestone together. Stones from the Rhine were also used in the construction of the fort. Like many Roman fortifications of the time, the fort didn't use rubble (Spoilia) from earlier fortifications because they had already been pillaged.

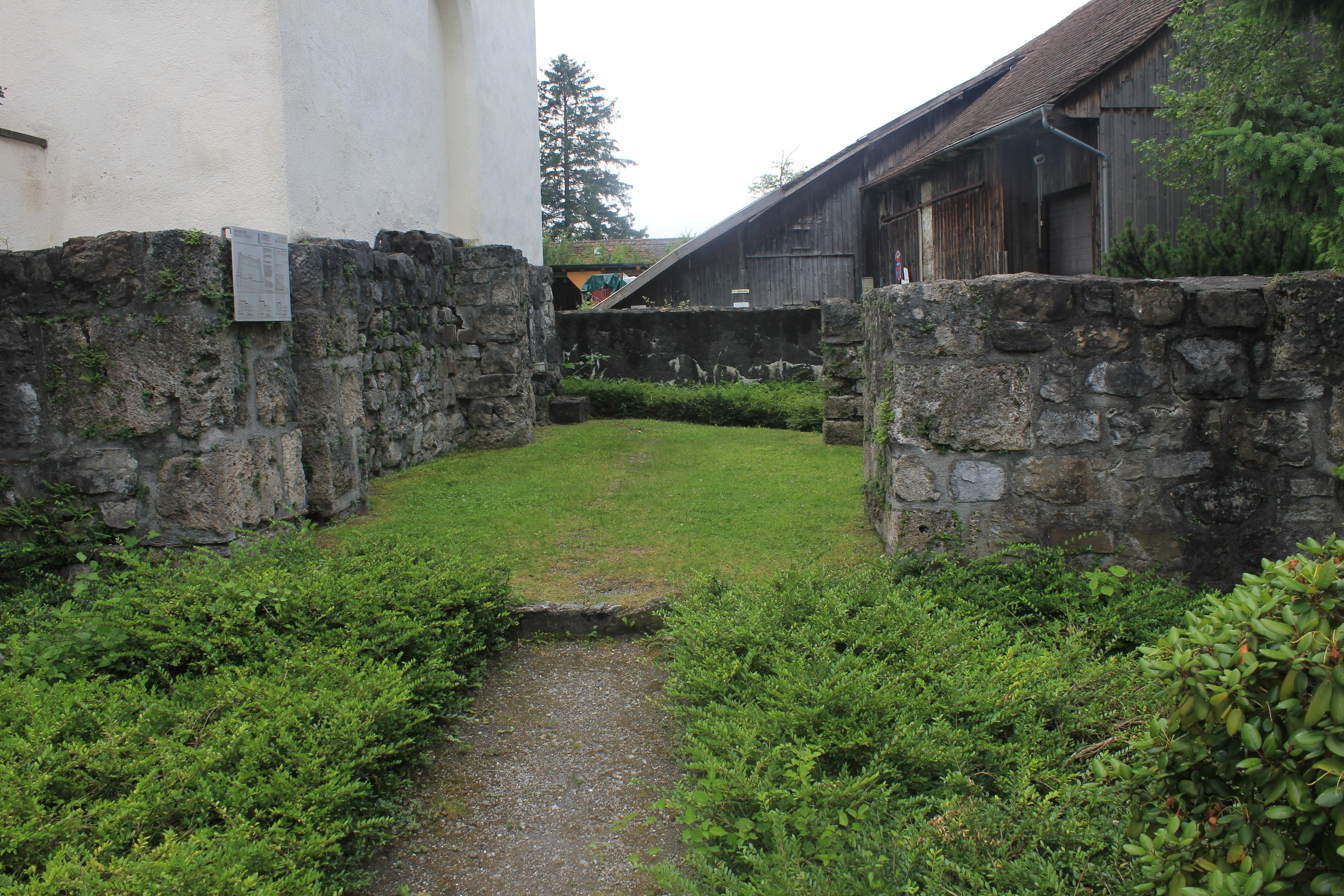
Roman walls near the chapel of St. Peter.

The barracks stood on either side of the main gate. As you ventured farther into the fort, there were various workshops that were necessary for the fort, such as a blacksmith. Farther past the workshops were 2 warehouses used for storing supplies in the event of a siege. Like many Roman fortifications, Fort Schaan had a bathhouse. The bathhouse and the fort's water supply was fed by a stream which flowed through a 30 cm x 30 cm channel in the east wall. The water was transported from there by both lead and wooden pipes. All of the building's rear walls were incorporated into the surrounding walls, which meant all of the entrances faced inward. The floors of every building consisted of lime mortar.

=== Wall dimensions ===
North Wall: 60.5 m (200 ft)

South Wall: 60.5 m (200 ft)

West Wall: 59 m (195 ft)

East Wall: 57.5 m (190 ft)

The East Wall was 3.6 m (11.9 ft) thick, and was the thickest of all 4 walls. The East Wall has been preserved between 1.5 m (5 ft) and 2.4 m (8 ft) tall near the Sacristy of St. Peter's Church. Only 5m of the south wall has ever been uncovered, but that was still enough to show that it had the same width as the South Wall. The other 2 walls, the North and West, have almost completely disappeared and only a few traces have ever been recovered.

=== Gate tower ===
The gate tower sat in the center of the North Wall, and was the main entrance to the fort. The gate tower was rectangular in shape, and measured 7.6m x 8.5m (25 ft x 28 ft), including the foundation. The entrance passageway was 2.9 m (9.6 ft) wide, and the walls around it were 2.35 m (7.8 ft) thick. Two 30 cm x 30 cm holes, one on each side of the building, were used to house latches which locked or unlocked the gate. After you passed through the first gate, you arrived at a 4.1m x 4.2m (13.5 ft x 13.9 ft) room. Beyond that, there is evidence that there was a secondary gate which led into the fort's courtyard.

=== Southeast corner tower ===
The Southeastern Corner Tower is the only majorly documented tower other than the gatehouse. The tower measured 7.9m x 7.9m (26 ft x 26 ft) on the outside. The walls were 1.9 m (6.3 ft) thick, and the internal area was 4m x 4m (13.2 ft x 13.2 ft). The mortar used to hold the tower is fairly weathered, indicating that the tower was most likely standing after the fall of the Roman Empire. Charred beams found during digging also indicate that the tower burned down.

=== St Peter's Church ===
During the 5th century, a church was built where the former Fort Schaan used to be. The church is the first evidence of Christianity in Liechtenstein, and the site where the church was discovered is close to the modern day Church of St. Peter. During Roman times, there was a church called a baptistry, which as the name suggests, was for baptising the local population. Since the church was on Roman property, it was later owned by the Frankish Empire. It appeared as royal property in a Rhaetian land register in 842/43.

== History ==
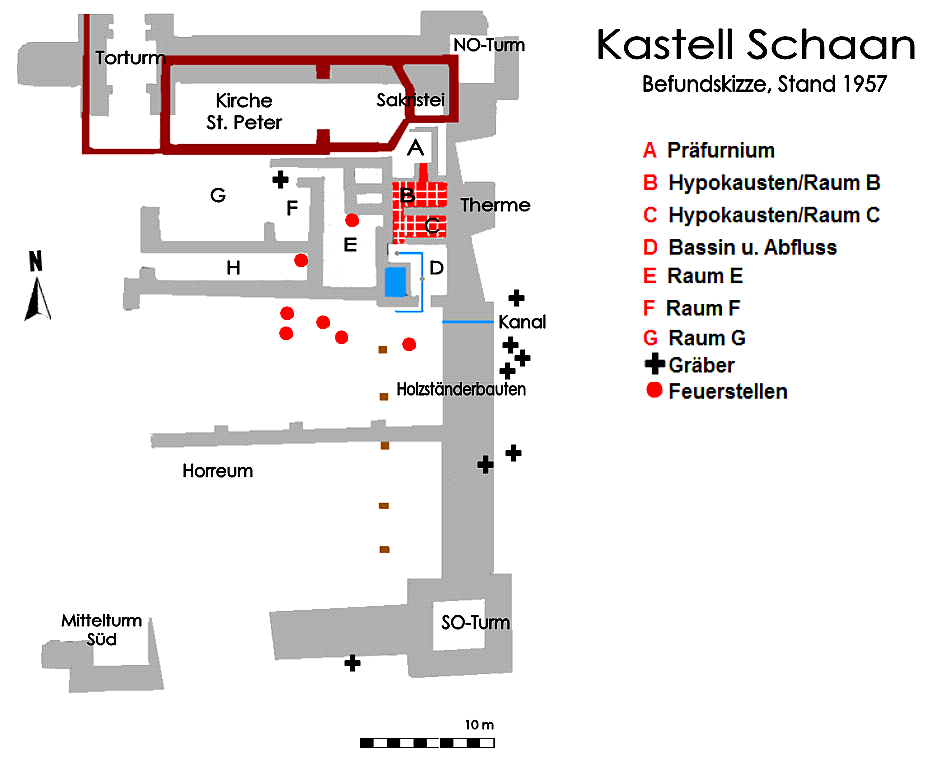
A map of the findings during Fort Schaan's excavation in the late 1950s.

During the 1st Century AD, the Romans built a military road linking Milan, Italy, to Bregenz, Austria. Fort Schaan was built along this road during the mid-4th Century, to defend it against the Alemanni people, who commonly raided the area. The name Schaan doesn't appear on any Roman maps of fortifications because the name of the fort is given based on its geographical location rather than original name. No trace of what the fort's original name was has ever been found. Later on, the central area of the fort would form the nucleus for the town of Schaan. The site was mainly excavated between 1956 and 1958, when the site was back filled to preserve the remains of the fort. Some of the last aboveground remains of the fort were destroyed when a dairy was built on the site in 1868. The archeological department of Liechtenstein still monitors the site to make sure nothing has changed and unearths a few more artifacts every few years.
