= Freddy Kaiser =

Mayor of Mauren from 2003 to 2023

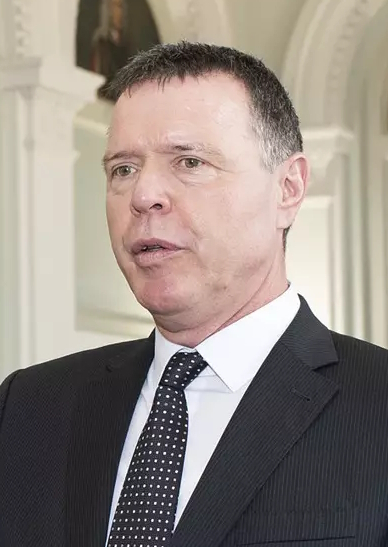
- Kaiser in 2019

Mayor of Mauren
- In office February 2003 – 1 May 2023
- Deputy: Doris Wohlwend (2003–2007); Michael Ritter (2007–2011); Hanspeter Öhri (2011–2015); Dominik Amman (2015–2023)
- Preceded by: Johannes Kaiser
- Succeeded by: Peter Frick

Personal details
- Born: 26 November 1961 (age 64) Grabs, Switzerland
- Party: Progressive Citizens' Party
- Spouse: Bettina Näscher (m. 1992)
- Children: 4

Freddy Kaiser (born 26 November 1961) is a politician from Liechtenstein who served as the mayor of Mauren from 2003 to 2023.

He works as a toolmaker. He was the commander of the Mauren volunteer fire department from 1994 to 2003 and a member of the Mauren municipal council. Throughout his tenure as mayor, he was continuously elected to the position unopposed.

== Honours ==
- Liechtenstein: Knight's Cross of the Order of Merit of the Principality of Liechtenstein (2023)
