= Adolf Buck =

German photographer (1896–1952)

- Born: 4 March 1896; Stuttgart, German Empire
- Died: 3 May 1952 (aged 56); Buenos Aires, Argentina
- Occupation: Photographer
- Children: 2

Military service
- Allegiance: German Empire
- Wars: World War I

Adolf Buck (4 March 1896 – 3 May 1952) was a German-Liechtensteiner photographer.

== Life ==
Buck was born on 4 March 1896 in Stuttgart and attended school in the city. He was a soldier for the German Empire in World War I before opening a photography firm in Bregenz in 1922, which operated in 1932.

Film by Buck of the ground-breaking ceremony of the Liechtenstein inland canal

He moved to Schaan and opened a photography firm and photograph publishing company, building a photo lab in 1937. He took photographs of numerous figures, buildings, landscapes and events in Liechtenstein. He was also a pioneer of film recordings in Liechtenstein, such as the completion of the Liechtenstein inland canal in 1943.

Buck was a member of the Nazi Party/Foreign Organization branch in Liechtenstein. In 1946 he was interned in French-occupied Austria on charges of espionage for Nazi Germany. Though he was ultimately acquitted, he was expelled from Liechtenstein and moved to Buenos Aires in 1950, where he worked as a photographer until he died of an illness in 1952, aged 56.
