= 1918 Liechtenstein local elections =

- May 1918

Local elections were held in Liechtenstein in May 1918 to elect the municipal councils and the mayors of the eleven municipalities.

== Results ==
=== By municipality ===
Municipality	Elected mayor
Balzers	Gebhard Brunhart
Eschen	Josef Marxer
Gamprin	Felix Gubelmann
Mauren	Andreas Meier
Planken	Josef Negele
Ruggell	Johann Büchel
Schaan	Andreas Eberle
Schellenberg	Karl Kaiser
Triesen	Oskar Bargetze
Triesenberg	Josef Gassner
Vaduz	Gustav Ospelt
Source: Liechtensteiner Volksblatt
