= Bartholomäus Batliner =

Liechtensteiner businessman (1842–1912)

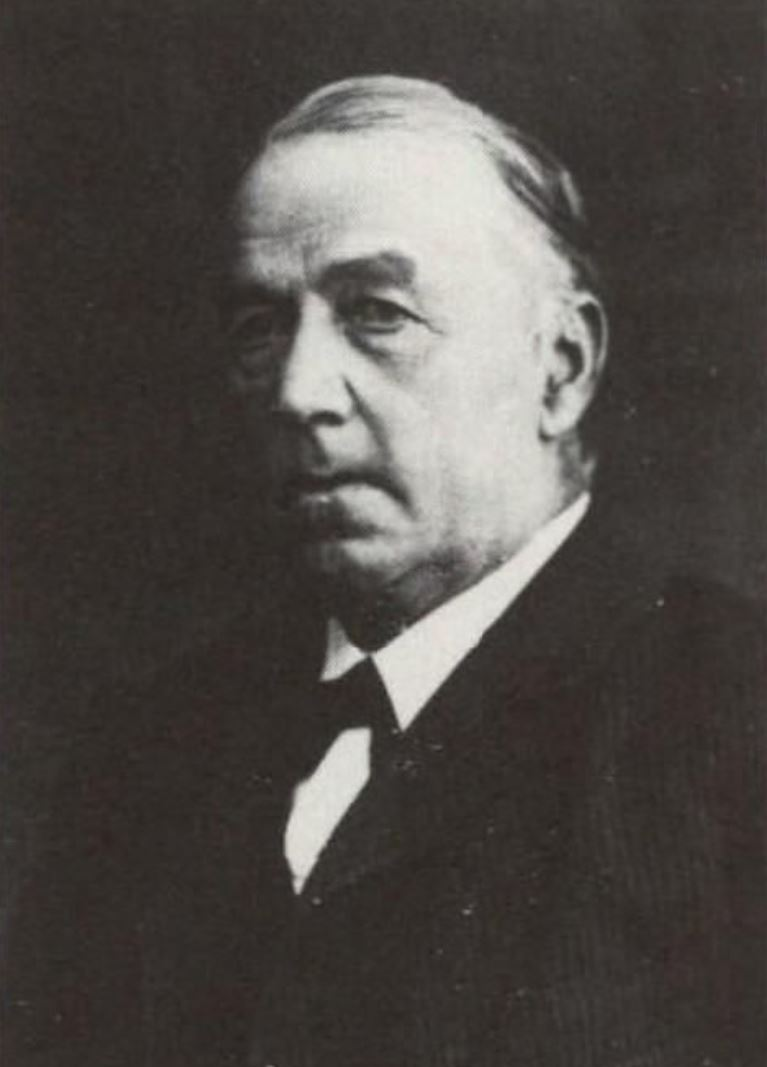
- Born: 24 August 1842; Mauren, Liechtenstein
- Died: 11 July 1912 (aged 69); Mauren, Liechtenstein
- Spouse: Ursula Meier (m. 1865; died 1900)
- Children: 10, including Emil Batliner

Bartholomäus Batliner (24 August 1842 – 11 July 1912) was a Liechtensteiner entrepreneur.

== Career ==
Batliner was an innkeeper of the Rössle in Mauren. He also run a peat mill in Nendeln and a steam-powered one in Mauren until 1905, which was focused on exports. From 1880, he ran a schnapps distillery which sold 40,000–50,000 litres annually, making it one of the largest distilleries in Liechtenstein. He is considered one of the most successful Liechtenstein businesses men of his time.

From 1873 to 1879, Batliner served as a municipal councillor in Mauren and from 1882 to 1885 and again from 1888 to 1891 he was deputy mayor of Mauren.

== Personal life ==
Batliner married Ursula Meier (20 October 1837 – 19 December 1900) on 30 October 1865 and they had 10 children together.

He died on 11 July 1912 in Mauren, aged 69 years old. His son Emil Batliner took over his distillery upon his death and served in the Landtag of Liechtenstein.
