= Lorenz Hilty =

Swiss computer scientist and author

Lorenz Manuel Hilty
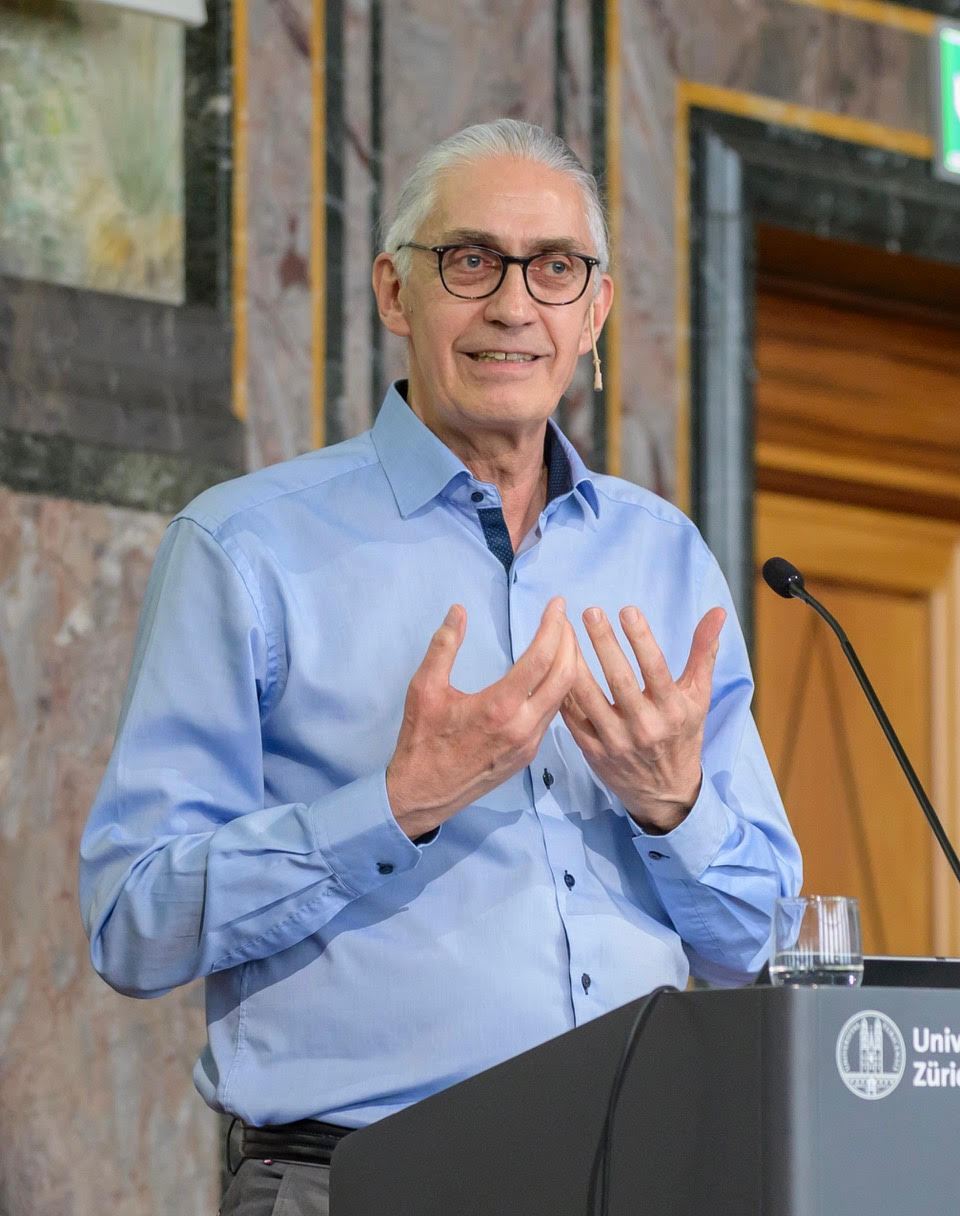
- Born: July 26, 1959 (age 67); St. Gallen, Switzerland
- Occupations: Computer scientist and author

Academic background
- Education: Ph.D. Computer Science (Informatics)
- Alma mater: University of Hamburg
- Website: https://www.ifi.uzh.ch/en/isr.html

Lorenz Manuel Hilty is a Swiss computer scientist and sustainability researcher most known for his work on the sustainability aspects of digital technologies.He was Professor of Informatics at the University of Zurich (UZH) in Switzerland until his retirement in July 2024, Sustainability Delegate of UZH and founding Director of the Zurich Knowledge Center for Sustainable Development.

Hilty is an Honorary Fellow of the ICT for Sustainability (ICT4S) conference and Member of the steering committee of TA-SWISS the Swiss foundation for Technology Assessment.

== Education ==
Hilty obtained a doctoral degree in Computer Science from the University of Hamburg (UHH) in 1991. He then conducted postdoctoral research projects focusing on methods for computational modeling of traffic and its environmental impacts at the University of St. Gallen (HSG) (1992), UHH (1993–1995) and the University of Ulm (1996–1998), working alongside Franz-Josef Radermacher.

He later submitted his post-doctoral habilitation thesis titled "Environmental Information Processing – Contributions of Informatics to Sustainable Development" at UHH, which was accepted in 1997.

== Scientific career ==
In 1998, Hilty was appointed as Professor of Information Systems at the University of Applied Sciences Northwestern Switzerland. In 2000, he initiated the research program Sustainability in the Information Society at Empa Swiss Federal Laboratories for Materials Science and Technology. From 2004 to 2010, he set up and headed Empa's Laboratory for Technology and Society. His research work at Empa was accompanied by teaching appointments at the University of Basel and St. Gallen and a Guest Professorship for New Media and Sustainability at the Institute for Social Ecology in Vienna. He joined UZH as a professor of Informatics and Sustainability at the Department of Informatics in 2010. In parallel, he was an Affiliated Professor at KTH Royal Institute of Technology in Stockholm from 2013 to 2018, where he worked with the Centre for Sustainable Communications (CESC). Since 2014, he has also served as the Sustainability Delegate of the executive board of UZH.

Hilty was appointed as an Expert to the Commission for Ethics and Technology at the Swiss Academy of Engineering Sciences in 2006, served as the Swiss Delegate to IFIP TC9 Computers and Society from 2002 to 2008 (2006 to 2008 as Vice Chair), and was a board member of the Swiss Informatics Society from 2003 to 2011. He initiated and chaired the first ICT for Sustainability conference ICT4S 2013 in Zurich and served on the Council of the University of Constance from 2019 to 2023.

== Research ==
Hilty's research interests include the social and ecological opportunities and risks of digital technologies. His laboratory at Empa became known for a System Dynamics model on the environmental impact of ICT in the European Union and for technology assessments of applying the precautionary principle to digital technologies and the emerging information society and research on the local and global material flows caused by the production and disposal of electronic equipment.

Hilty has contributed to the conceptualization of the interdisciplinary field of research between ecological sustainability and digital technologies, and later played a key role in the emergence of ICT4S (Information and Communication Technology for Sustainability) as an interdisciplinary field of research and an international community. At the University of Zurich, Hilty's research group has examined the environmental impacts of digital technologies, with a particular focus on energy demand, sustainability, and climate policy. Their work has quantified the direct energy consumption of internet data flows, and analyzed how digitalization affects individual time use and energy consumption. His group has also contributed to frameworks for assessing sustainable software with respect to resource and energy efficiency, and examined the opportunities and risks of digitalization for climate protection in Switzerland. More recent studies have addressed the environmental and societal implications of the digital sharing economy by integrating technical and social perspectives.

== Awards and honors ==
- 2023 – Honorary Fellow Award, ICT4S

== Bibliography ==
=== Selected books ===
- Information Systems for Sustainable Development (2005) ISBN 978-1591403449
- Information Technology and Sustainability: Essays on the Relationship between Information Technology and Sustainable Development (2008) ISBN 978-3837019704
- What Kind of Information Society? Governance, Virtuality, Surveillance, Sustainability, Resilience (2010) ISBN 978-3642154782
- ICT Innovations for Sustainability (2015) ISBN 978-3319092270

=== Selected articles ===
- Bieser, Jan C. T.; Hintemann, Ralph; Hilty, Lorenz M.; Beucker, Severin (2023-03-01). "A review of assessments of the greenhouse gas footprint and abatement potential of information and communication technology". Environmental Impact Assessment Review. 99 107033. Bibcode:2023EIARv..9907033B. doi:10.1016/j.eiar.2022.107033. ISSN 0195-9255.
- Hilty, L. M., Arnfalk, P., Erdmann, L., Goodman, J., Lehmann, M., & Wäger, P. A. (2006). The relevance of information and communication technologies for environmental sustainability–a prospective simulation study. Environmental Modelling & Software, 21(11), 1618–1629.
- Erdmann, L., & Hilty, L. M. (2010). Scenario analysis: exploring the macroeconomic impacts of information and communication technologies on greenhouse gas emissions. Journal of Industrial Ecology, 14(5), 826–843.
- Hilty, L., Lohmann, W., & Huang, E. M. (2011). Sustainability and ICT–an overview of the field. Notizie di Politeia, 27(104), 13–28.
- Coroama, V. C., & Hilty, L. M. (2014). Assessing Internet energy intensity: A review of methods and results. Environmental impact assessment review, 45, 63–68. DOI: 10.1016/j.eiar.2013.12.004
- Kern, E., Hilty, L. M., Guldner, A., Maksimov, Y. V., Filler, A., Gröger, J., & Naumann, S. (2018). Sustainable software products—Towards assessment criteria for resource and energy efficiency. Future Generation Computer Systems, 86, 199–210. DOI: Sustainable software products—Towards assessment criteria for resource and energy efficiency
