= 1932 Liechtenstein electoral system referendum =

- 14 February 1932
- Referendum on a new electoral system

Results
Choice	Votes	%
Yes	1,202	54.94%
No	986	45.06%
Valid votes	2,188	97.81%
Invalid or blank votes	49	2.19%
Total votes	2,237	100.00%
Registered voters/turnout	2,338	95.68%

A referendum on a new electoral system was held in Liechtenstein on 14 February 1932. The proposal was approved by 54.9% of voters.

== Results ==
Choice	Votes	%
For	1,202	54.9
Against	986	45.1
Invalid/blank votes	49	–
Total	2,237	100
Registered voters/turnout	2,338	95.7
Source: Nohlen & Stöver
