= Andreas Meier (mayor) =

Mayor of Mauren from 1918 to 1921

Mayor of Mauren
- In office 1918–1921
- Preceded by: Emil Batliner
- Succeeded by: Rudolf Matt

Personal details
- Born: 28 August 1861; Mauren, Liechtenstein
- Died: 18 February 1922 (aged 60); Mauren, Liechtenstein
- Political party: Progressive Citizens' Party

Andreas Meier (28 August 1861 – 18 February 1922) was a politician from Liechtenstein who served as the mayor of Mauren from 1918 to 1921.

From 1906 to 1915 he was the Mauren municipal treasurer. During his time as mayor, the cemetery was expanded.
