= Johann Büchel =

Liechtensteiner and politician (1869–1930)

Member of the Landtag of Liechtenstein for Unterland
- In office 5 February 1922 – 10 January 1926

Mayor of Ruggell
- In office 1921–1930
- Preceded by: Andreas Eberle
- Succeeded by: Franz Xaver Hoop

Personal details
- Born: 10 May 1869 Ruggell, Liechtenstein
- Died: 16 May 1930 (aged 61) Ruggell, Liechtenstein
- Party: Christian-Social People's Party
- Spouse: Franziska Hoop (m. 1905)
- Children: 9

Johann Büchel (10 May 1869 – 16 May 1930) was a farmer and politician from Liechtenstein who served in the Landtag of Liechtenstein from 1922 to 1926. He also served as Mayor of Ruggell from 1921 to 1930.

== Life ==
Büchel was born on 10 May 1869 in Ruggell as the son of veterinarian Ulrich Büchel and Magdalena (née Schöch) as one of five children. He worked in Switzerland in his early adulthood, and then worked as a farmer, bricklayer and embroiderer.

He was a member of the Ruggell municipal council from 1906 to 1912. He was mayor of the municipality from 1921 to 1930 as a member of the Christian-Social People's Party (VP). During this time, he oversaw the construction of a bridge between Ruggell and Sennwald. Büchel was a member of the Landtag of Liechtenstein from 1922 to 1926 and he was also the Vice president of the Landtag from 1923 to 1924. He unsuccessfully ran for re-election in the January 1926 elections.

Büchel married Franziska Hoop (8 March 1878 – 2 May 1953) on 6 March 1905 and they had nine children together. On 6 May 1930, Büchel fell into a furnace while unloading logs and fractured his skull. He died ten days later, aged 61.

== Bibliography ==
- Vogt, Paul (1987). 125 Jahre Landtag (in German). Vaduz: Landtag of the Principality of Liechtenstein.
