= David Bühler =

Mayor of Mauren from 1930 to 1933

Mayor of Mauren
- In office 1930 – October 1933
- Preceded by: Emil Batliner
- Succeeded by: David Meier

Personal details
- Born: 6 February 1872; Mauren, Liechtenstein
- Died: 26 July 1938 (aged 66); Mauren, Liechtenstein
- Political party: Progressive Citizens' Party
- Spouse: Wilhelmine Marock (m. 1896; died 1925)
- Children: 4, including Oswald Bühler

David Bühler (6 February 1872 – 26 July 1938) was an accountant and politician from Liechtenstein who served as the mayor of Mauren from 1930 to 1933.

He educated as an accountant in Dornbirn and Laa an der Thaya, then he worked as a legal agent in Mauren and also as a farmer. From 1923 to 1931 he was the president of the state tax commission. During his time as mayor, Bühler was responsible for raising funds for a community water supply and a church building fund. He resigned from the position in October 1933.

His son Oswald Bühler also served as the mayor of Mauren and also in the Landtag of Liechtenstein.
