= Emil Batliner =

Liechtensteiner entrepreneur and politician (1869–1947)

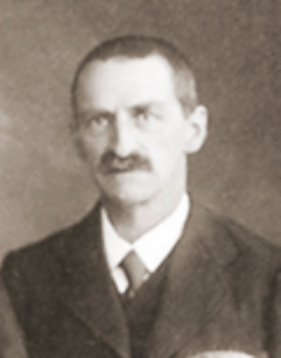
- Batliner in 1920

Member of the Landtag of Liechtenstein for Unterland
- In office 10 January 1926 – 4 April 1939
- In office 1909 – 11 March 1918

Mayor of Mauren
- In office 1924–1930
- Preceded by: Rudolf Matt
- Succeeded by: David Bühler
- In office 1909–1918
- Deputy: Medard Ritter
- Preceded by: Franz Josef Ritter
- Succeeded by: Andreas Meier

Personal details
- Born: 19 April 1869 Mauren, Liechtenstein
- Died: 11 June 1947 (aged 78) Mauren, Liechtenstein
- Party: Progressive Citizens' Party
- Spouse: Emilie Walser (m. 1893)
- Children: 12
- Parent(s): Bartholomäus Batliner; Maria Ursula Meier

Emil Batliner (19 April 1869 – 11 June 1947) was a Liechtensteiner entrepreneur and political figure who served in the Landtag of Liechtenstein from 1909 to 1918 and again from 1926 to 1939. He was Mayor of Mauren from 1909 to 1918 and again from 1924 to 1930.

== Early life ==
Batliner was born on 19 April 1869 in Mauren as the son of Bartholomäus Batliner and his mother Maria Ursula Meier as one of ten children. His father was a successful entrepreneur who earned his money by selling peat logs and running his own schnapps distillery. He worked as a farmer.

Due to the poor economic situation in Liechtenstein in the late 19th century Batliner moved to Dubuque, Iowa in 1890, but returned in 1893. He took over his father's distillery upon his death in 1912.

== Career ==
From 1909 to 1918 and again from 1924 to 1930 he was a community leader in Mauren. During this time, he built an orphanage in 1912 and a teacher's house in 1913 within the municipality. He was a member of the state emergency commission, formed at the beginning of World War I.

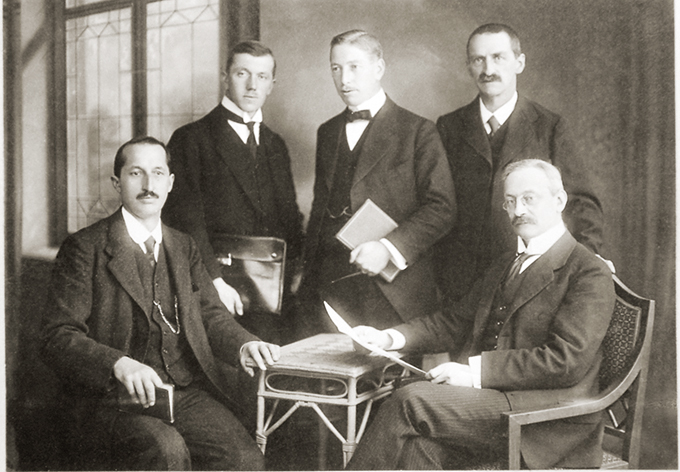
Batliner (top-right) as part of the Liechtenstein delegation for custom union negotiations with Switzerland, 1920.

From 1910 to 1918 Batliner was a member of the Landtag of Liechtenstein. After Leopold Freiherr von Imhof was unconstitutionally removed as Governor of Liechtenstein in November 1918 by opposition members Wilhelm Beck, Martin Ritter and Fritz Walser they set up a provisional executive committee in his place. Batliner refused to be a member of the committee and promptly resigned from the Landtag.

In 1918 Batliner was a founding member of the Progressive Citizens' Party and was a deputy district administrator from 1919 to 1921. He was a member of the Liechtenstein delegation of negotiations with Switzerland for forming closer economic ties, which cultivated in a customs union being formed between the two countries in 1924.

From 1926 to 1939 he was once again was a member of the Landtag of Liechtenstein. He was Vice President of the Landtag four times – from 1926 to 1928, 1932 to 1933, 1934 to 1935 and finally from 1937 to 1938. He was a member of the state aid commission after the Rhine collapse in 1927. Since the rise of Nazi Germany in 1933 and the introduction of anti-Jewish laws in the country Liechtenstein experienced a large rise of Jewish emigrants to the country in which Batliner supported the government led by Josef Hoop in the naturalization of the refugees under a new citizenship law.

== Personal life ==
Batliner married Emilie Walser (26 October 1872 – 18 January 1955) on 27 September 1893 and they had twelve children together, four of whom emigrated to the United States and Brazil. His son Eduard was a prominent Liechtenstein banker, and his grandson Herbert Batliner a notable art collector. He died on 11 June 1947, aged 78 years old.

== Bibliography ==
- Vogt, Paul (1987). 125 Jahre Landtag (in German). Vaduz: Landtag of the Principality of Liechtenstein.
