= Daniel Hilti =

Mayor of Schaan since 2003

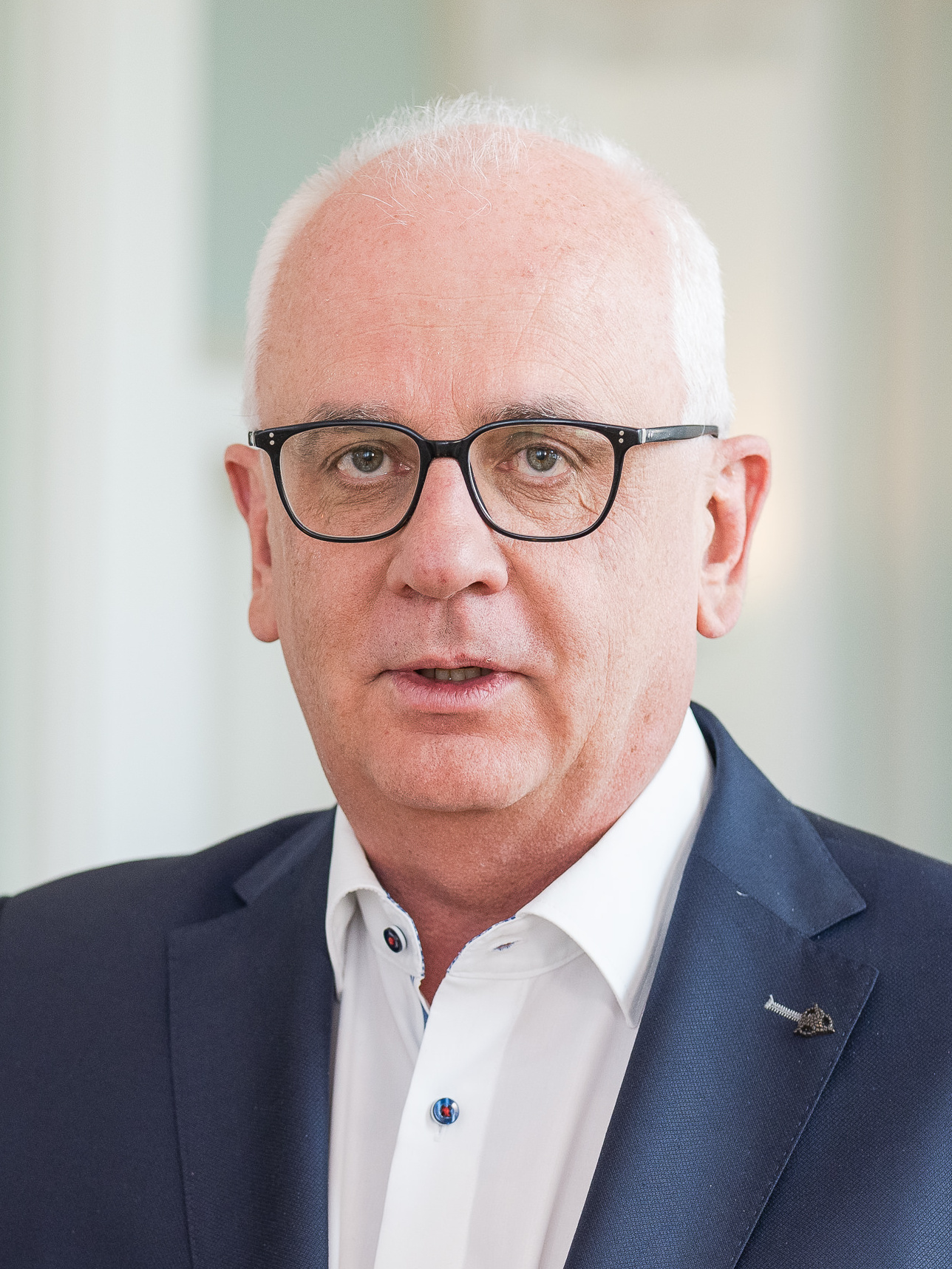
- Hilti in 2023

Mayor of Schaan
- Incumbent
- Assumed office February 2003
- Deputy: Albert Frick; Markus Falk; Alexandra Konrad-Biedermann
- Preceded by: Hansjakob Falk

Personal details
- Born: 11 April 1965 (age 60) Vaduz, Liechtenstein
- Party: Patriotic Union
- Spouse: Ursula Liechti (m. 2000)
- Children: 2

Daniel Hilti (born 11 April 1965) is a teacher and politician from Liechtenstein who has served as mayor of Schaan since 2003.

== Life ==
From 1986 to 1991 he worked as a primary school teacher in Balzers. He was president of FC Schaan from 2000 to 2003. Since 2003, he has been mayor of Schaan.

Hilti married Ursula Liechti (born 19 May 1963) on 15 September 2000 and they have two children together. He lives in Schaan.
