= David Meier =

Mayor of Mauren from 1933 to 1948

Mayor of Mauren
- In office October 1933 – 1948
- Deputy: Rudolf Marxer
- Preceded by: David Bühler
- Succeeded by: Oswald Bühler

Personal details
- Born: 26 June 1891; Mauren, Liechtenstein
- Died: 21 April 1986 (aged 94); Mauren, Liechtenstein
- Political party: Progressive Citizens' Party
- Spouse: Maria Mündle (m. 1916; died 1954)
- Children: 3

David Meier (26 June 1891 – 21 April 1986) was a politician from Liechtenstein who served as mayor of Mauren from 1933 to 1948.

He worked as a farmer. He was a member of the Mauren municipal council from 1924 to 1930. During his tenure as mayor, the church was renovated, and he managed the Maurer drinking water supply from 1931 to 1932.
