= Ferdinand Risch =

Liechtenstein politician (1880–1940)

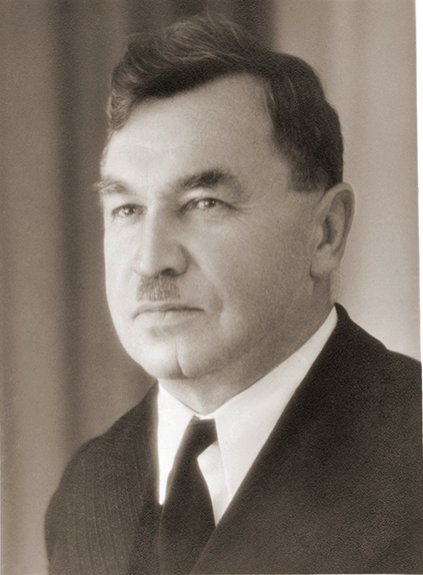
- Portrait by Adolf Buck

Member of the Landtag of Liechtenstein for Oberland
- In office 15 July 1928 – 16 April 1940
- Succeeded by: Bernhard Risch

Mayor of Schaan
- In office 1927 – 16 April 1940
- Deputy: Johann Hilti; Josef Schierscher
- Preceded by: Johann Hilti
- Succeeded by: Josef Schierscher

Personal details
- Born: 13 June 1880 Schaan, Liechtenstein
- Died: 16 April 1940 (aged 59) Grabs, Switzerland
- Party: Progressive Citizens' Party
- Spouse: Maria Viktoria Beck (m. 1912)
- Children: 4

Ferdinand Risch (13 June 1880 – 16 April 1940) was a politician from Liechtenstein who served in the Landtag of Liechtenstein from 1928 to 1940. He was also mayor of Schaan from 1927 to 1940.

== Life ==
Risch was born on 13 June 1880 in Schaan as the son of Johann Ferdinand Risch and Agatha (née Tanner) as one of two children. He worked as a bricklayer in Switzerland and Vorarlberg, then later as a farmer.

Risch was a founding member of the Progressive Citizens' Party (FBP) in February 1918. From 1918 to 1921 he was a member of the Schaan municipal council before becoming serving as mayor of the municipality and head of the Schaan municipal tax commission from 1927 to his death in 1940. During his time as mayor, he played a role in managing the response to the 1927 Rhine flood. In addition, it also oversaw the building of the St. Elisabeth Monastery, which opened in 1935.

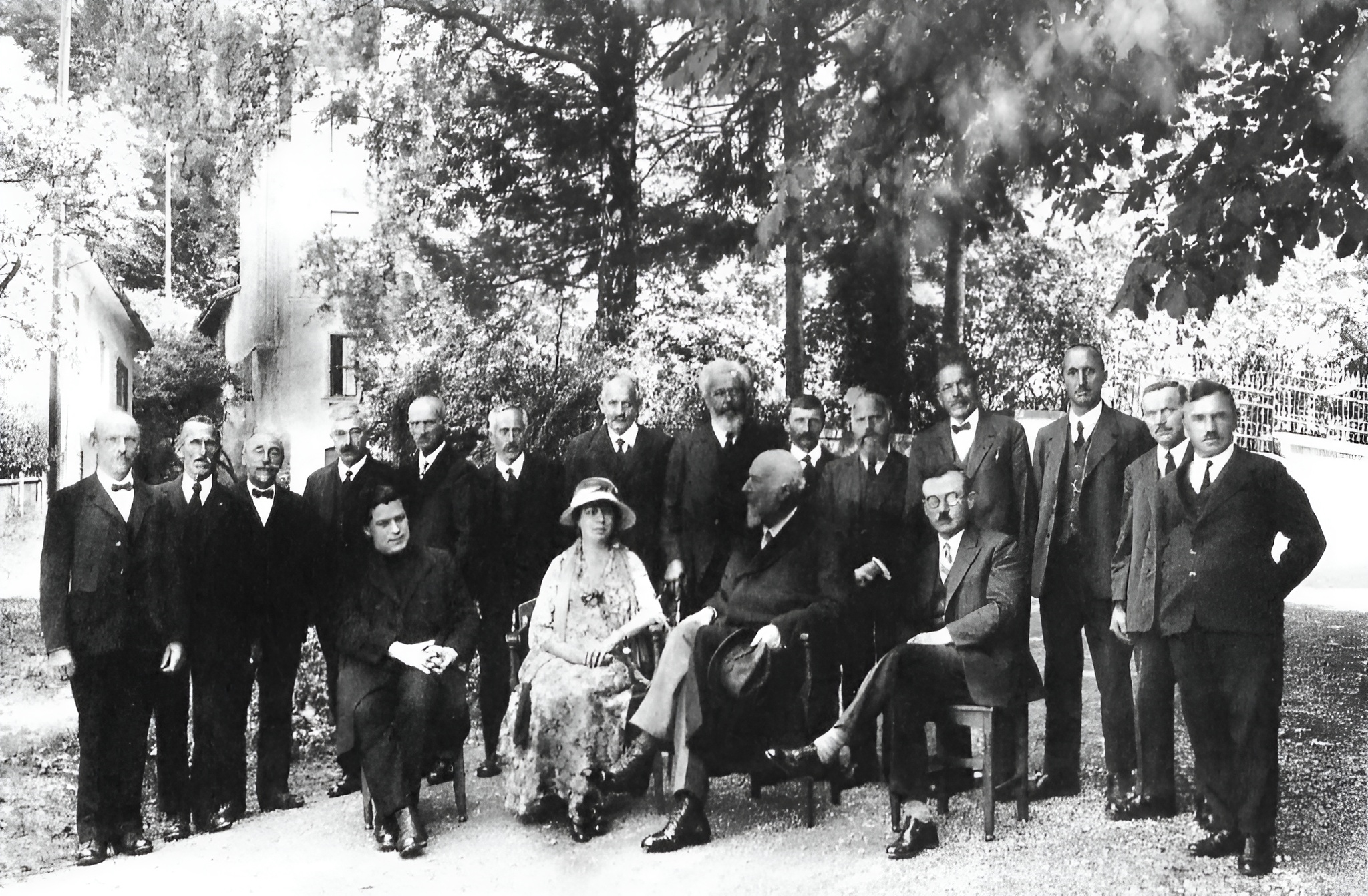
Risch (right) with members of the Landtag and Franz I in 1931

Elected as a member of the Landtag of Liechtenstein in the 1928 elections, he would also serve in this position until his death in 1940. From 1914 to 1940 he was the treasurer of the Liechtenstein Livestock Insurance Association. In these roles, he advocated for the building of the Liechtenstein inland canal, which was approved in 1930 and started construction in 1931.

During the 1939 Liechtenstein putsch, he played a role in organizing the opposition, alongside Anton Frommelt, which intercepted the marchers of the German National Movement in Liechtenstein (VDBL) outside of Schaan and convinced them to turn back.

Risch married Maria Viktoria Beck (6 February 1883 – 15 April 1949) on 15 April 1912 and they had four children together. He died in an accident on 16 April 1940 in Grabs, Switzerland, aged 59.

== Honours ==
- Liechtenstein: Knight's Cross of the Order of Merit of the Principality of Liechtenstein (1937)
