= Schaan =

- Municipality
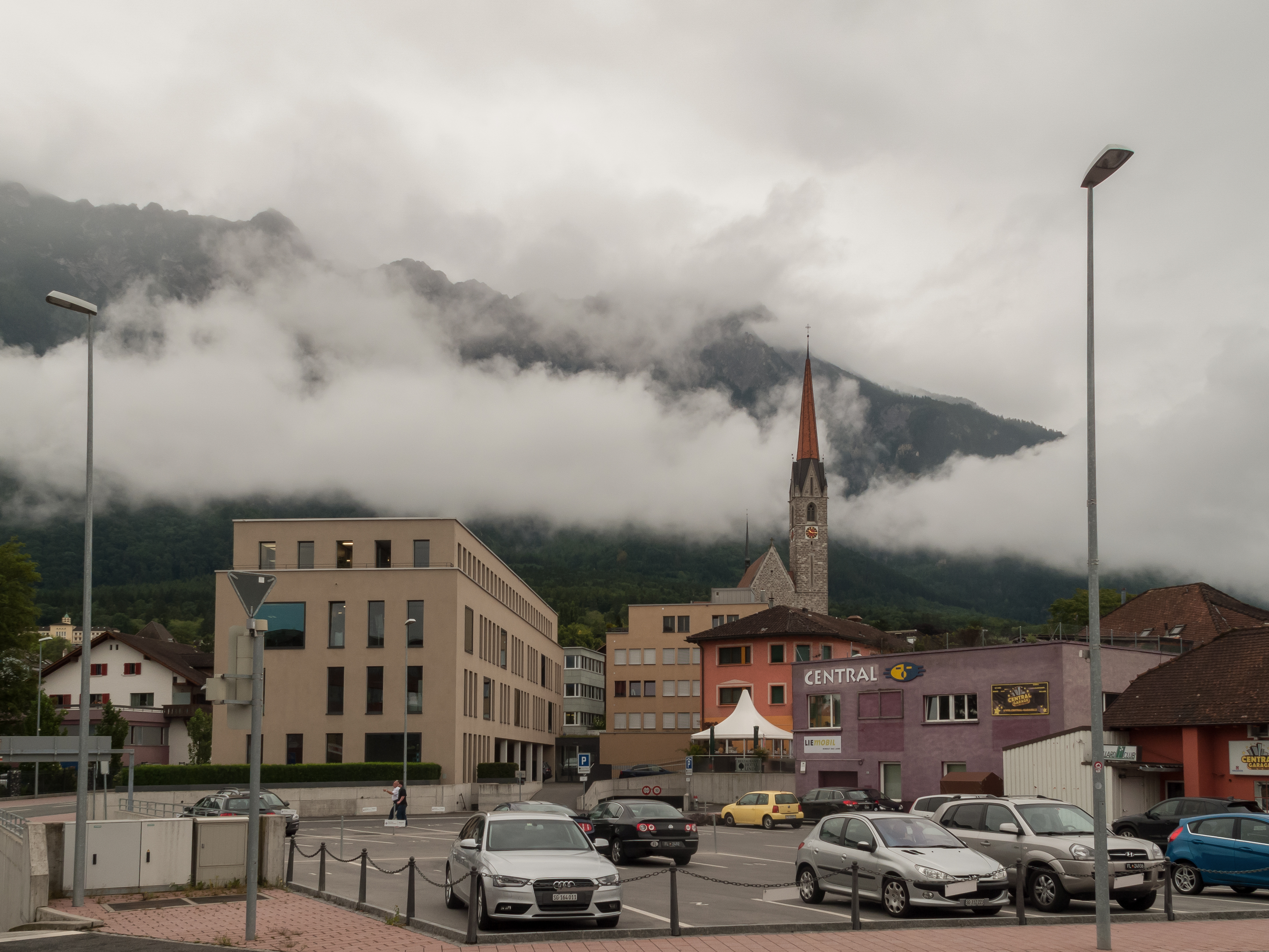
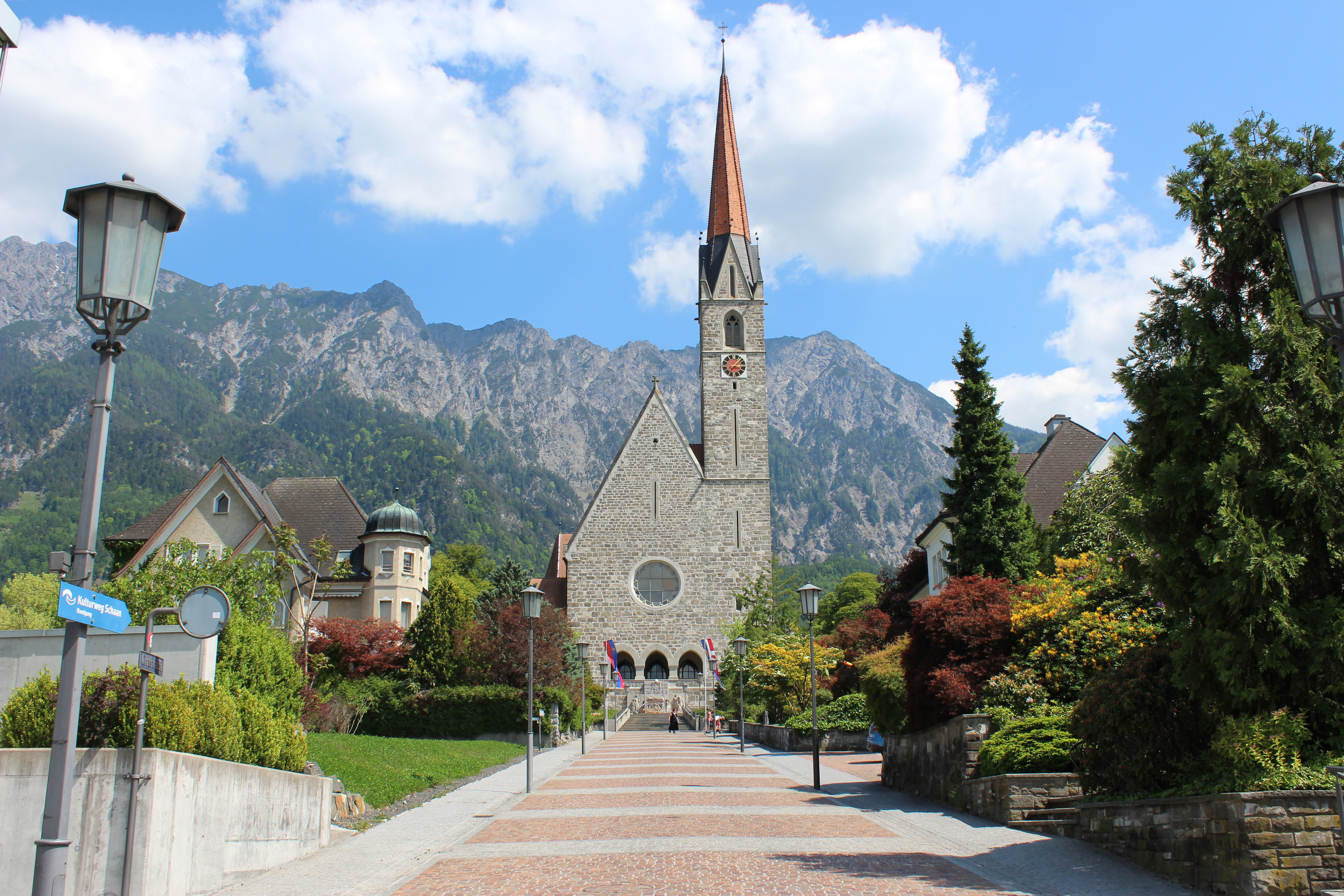
- city center, St. Laurentius Parish Church

- Flag Coat of arms
- Interactive map of Schaan
- Coordinates: 47°10′00″N 9°30′35″E
- Country: Liechtenstein
- Electoral district: Oberland
- Villages: none

Government
  - Mayor: Daniel Hilti (VU)

Area
  - Total: 26.92 km^{2} (10.39 sq mi)
- Elevation: 450 m (1,480 ft)

Population (31-12-2019)
  - Total: 6,039
  - Density: 224.3/km^{2} (581.0/sq mi)
- Time zone: UTC+1 (CET)
  - Summer (DST): UTC+2 (CEST)
- Postal code: 9494
- Area code: 7005
- ISO 3166 code: LI-07
- Website: www.schaan.li

Schaan (German pronunciation: [ʃaːn]; dialectal: Schaa) is the largest municipality of Liechtenstein by population. It is located to the north of Vaduz, the capital, in the central part of the country. As of 2019 it has a population of 6,039, making it the most populous administrative district in Liechtenstein. Representing an important traffic hub and industrial location of the country, Schaan covers an area of 26.92 km^{2} (10.39 mi^{2}), including mountains and forest. It is a municipality within the electoral district of Oberland in the Principality of Liechtenstein. Schaan contains four exclaves: Brunnenegg, Gritsch, Guschg, and Plankner Neugrütt.

== History ==
Recent archaeological finds have shown that Schaan has been inhabited for over 6,000 years: In the year 15 BC, the Romans, under Augustus, conquered the territory of the present Principality of Liechtenstein and established the Roman province of Raetia. In the 1st century AD, a military road was built from Milan to Bregenz, running along the Luzisteig on the right bank of the Rhine. This led to the building of settlements in modern-day Schaan. In 1887, two Roman legionnaire's helmets were found buried during digging work above Dux. Bearing the engraved names of the legionaries Publius Cavidius Felix and Numerius Pomponius and dated to the 1st century AD, it is likely that they were intended as a variety of commemoration of the two men. They are now housed in the museums of Bregenz and Zurich.

The most important Roman building on the territory of the municipality is a fort called Fort Schaan, built in the valley, whose purpose was to afford protection against the ever more frequent Alemannic invasions. Remains of its foundations and the gate tower are again visible from St. Peter's Church, Schaan. A 5th century baptistery was found during excavations inside this church, suggesting early Christianization. During excavations there, traces of a prehistoric settlement were also found.

The Alemannic settlement is evidenced by numerous grave finds. At that time Schaan consisted of two separate parts. The Romanized Räter-people had their centre at St. Peter, while the Alemannic population settled in the area of Specki. This dichotomy can still be seen today in the existence of two alpine cooperatives, the North-Alemannic cooperative Gritsch and the southern Rhaeto-Roman cooperative Guschg.

== Geography ==
Schaan is the northernmost municipality in the Liechtenstein Oberland. It is bordered to the south by the capital, Vaduz, to the east by Planken and Triesenberg, and to the north by the municipalities of Eschen and Gamprin. In the west, the Rhine forms the natural border with Switzerland, and in the east, the town is dominated by the Drei Schwestern mountain range. Schaan also has four exclaves within other municipalities, and two enclaves within its primary municipality. Because of this, Schaan borders Austria in three separate locations.

=== Climate ===
Schaan has an Oceanic climate (Koppen: Cfb) using the -3°C isotherm, or a humid continental climate (Köppen: Dfb) using the 0°C isotherm.

Climate data for Schaan
| Month | Jan | Feb | Mar | Apr | May | Jun | Jul | Aug | Sep | Oct | Nov | Dec | Year |
|---|---|---|---|---|---|---|---|---|---|---|---|---|---|
| Mean daily maximum °C (°F) | 2.6 (36.7) | 4.8 (40.6) | 9.5 (49.1) | 13.8 (56.8) | 18.1 (64.6) | 21.3 (70.3) | 23.4 (74.1) | 22.5 (72.5) | 19.7 (67.5) | 14.1 (57.4) | 8.1 (46.6) | 3.4 (38.1) | 13.4 (56.1) |
| Daily mean °C (°F) | −0.6 (30.9) | 1.1 (34.0) | 4.9 (40.8) | 8.8 (47.8) | 12.9 (55.2) | 16.2 (61.2) | 18.3 (64.9) | 17.6 (63.7) | 14.8 (58.6) | 9.8 (49.6) | 4.6 (40.3) | 0.4 (32.7) | 9.1 (48.4) |
| Mean daily minimum °C (°F) | −3.7 (25.3) | −2.6 (27.3) | 0.4 (32.7) | 3.9 (39.0) | 7.8 (46.0) | 11.2 (52.2) | 13.2 (55.8) | 12.7 (54.9) | 10.0 (50.0) | 5.6 (42.1) | 1.1 (34.0) | −2.5 (27.5) | 4.8 (40.6) |
| Average precipitation mm (inches) | 67 (2.6) | 62 (2.4) | 65 (2.6) | 87 (3.4) | 106 (4.2) | 132 (5.2) | 130 (5.1) | 140 (5.5) | 103 (4.1) | 76 (3.0) | 79 (3.1) | 76 (3.0) | 1,123 (44.2) |
Source: Climate-data.org

== Politics ==
Schaan is locally administered by the mayor and a 13-person municipal council, elected every four years since 1975. The incumbent mayor is Daniel Hilti, since 2003.

=== Last election ===
| Party | Votes | % | Seats | +/– |
|---|---|---|---|---|
| Patriotic Union | 10,244 | 43.62 | 6 | –1 |
| Progressive Citizens' Party | 10,057 | 42.82 | 6 | +1 |
| Free List | 3,183 | 13.55 | 1 | 0 |
| Total | 23,484 | 100.00 | 13 | 0 |
| Valid votes | 1,957 | 92.97 | | |
| Invalid votes | 97 | 4.61 | | |
| Blank votes | 51 | 2.42 | | |
| Total votes | 2,105 | 100.00 | | |
| Registered voters/turnout | 3,130 | 67.25 | | |
Source: Gemeindewahlen

== Transport ==
=== Schaan-Vaduz railway station ===
Schaan-Vaduz is one of the four train stations serving Liechtenstein, located in the town of Schaan, 3.5 km from Vaduz. It is owned by the Austrian Federal Railways (ÖBB). The station is served by eighteen trains per day, nine in each direction between Switzerland and Austria. It is situated on the international and electrified Feldkirch-Buchs line, between the station of Buchs SG (in Switzerland) and the stop of Forst Hilti (in the northern suburb of Schaan). It is served only by regional trains.

=== Schaan Forst Hilti railway station ===
The station is served by eighteen trains per day, nine in each direction between Switzerland and Austria. It is located in front of the Hilti Corporation's headquarters, on the outskirts of Schaan.

== Education ==
There are four kindergarten sites: Malarsch, Pardiel, Rebera, and Werkof. The Gemeinschaftszentrum Resch, Primarschule provides primary education.

Realschule Schaan and Sportschule Liechtenstein are in Schaan, while Realschule Vaduz and Oberschule Vaduz are in the Schulzentrum Mühleholz II in Vaduz. Liechtensteinisches Gymnasium is also in Vaduz.

There is a private Waldorf school which has students from, in addition to Liechtenstein, Austria and Switzerland. It was established in 1985.

== Notable people ==
- Sabine Dünser (1977–2006), Liechtensteiner gothic and symphonic metal singer and lyricist
- Paul Frommelt (born 1957, Schaan), retired Alpine skier
- Maria Grabher-Meyer (1898–1970), Liechtensteiner poet and short story writer
- Roman Hermann (born 1953, Schaan), Liechtensteiner former cyclist
- Peter Jehle (born 1982, Schaan), footballer who plays for Liechtenstein club FC Vaduz as a goalkeeper
- Gerta Keller (born 1945, Schaan), Professor of Paleontology and Geology at Princeton University since 1984.
- Maria von Linden (1869–1936), German bacteriologist and zoologist
- Ivan Quintans (born 1989, Schaan), a Liechtensteiner footballer

== Gallery ==
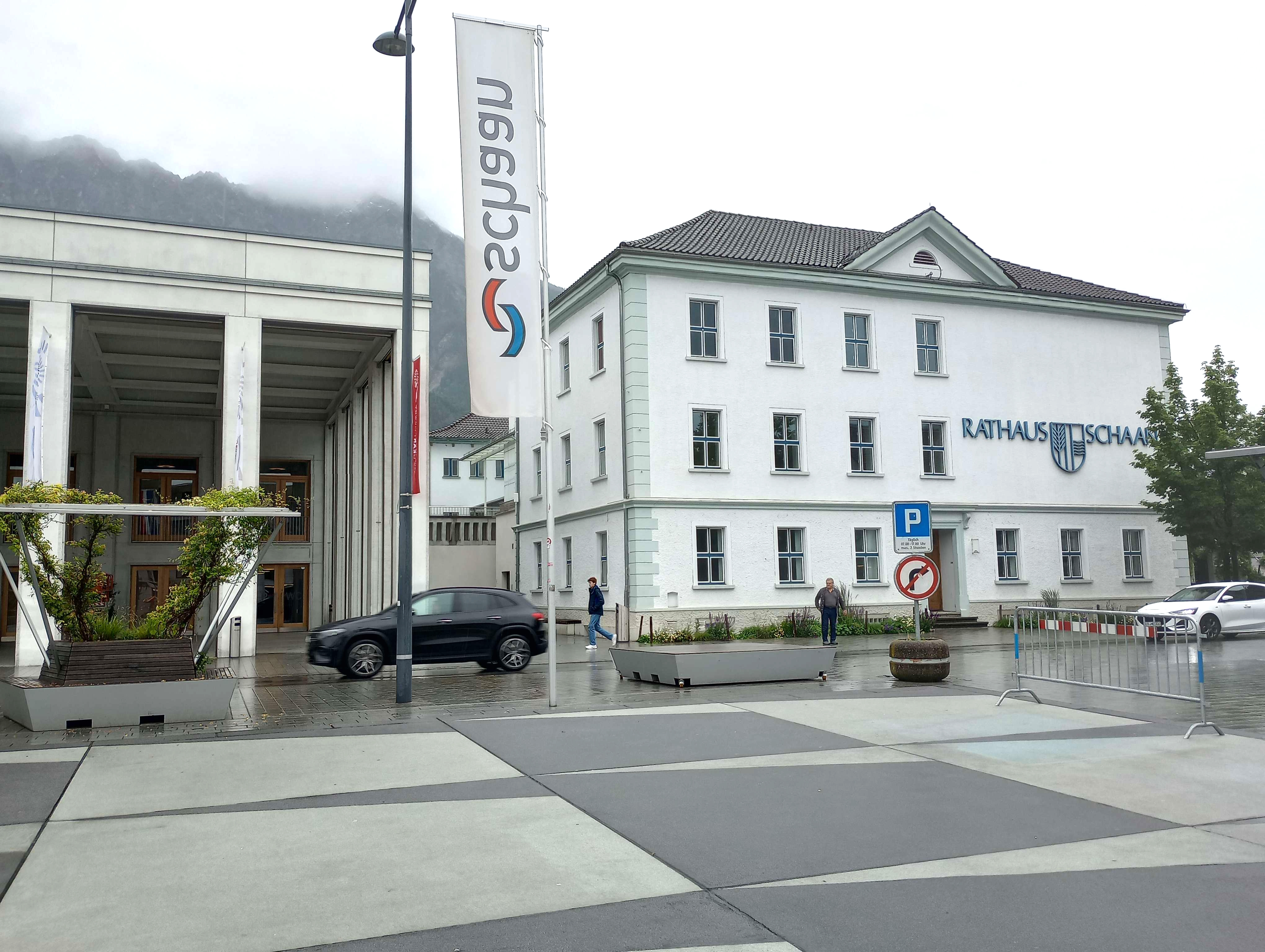
Schaan town hall

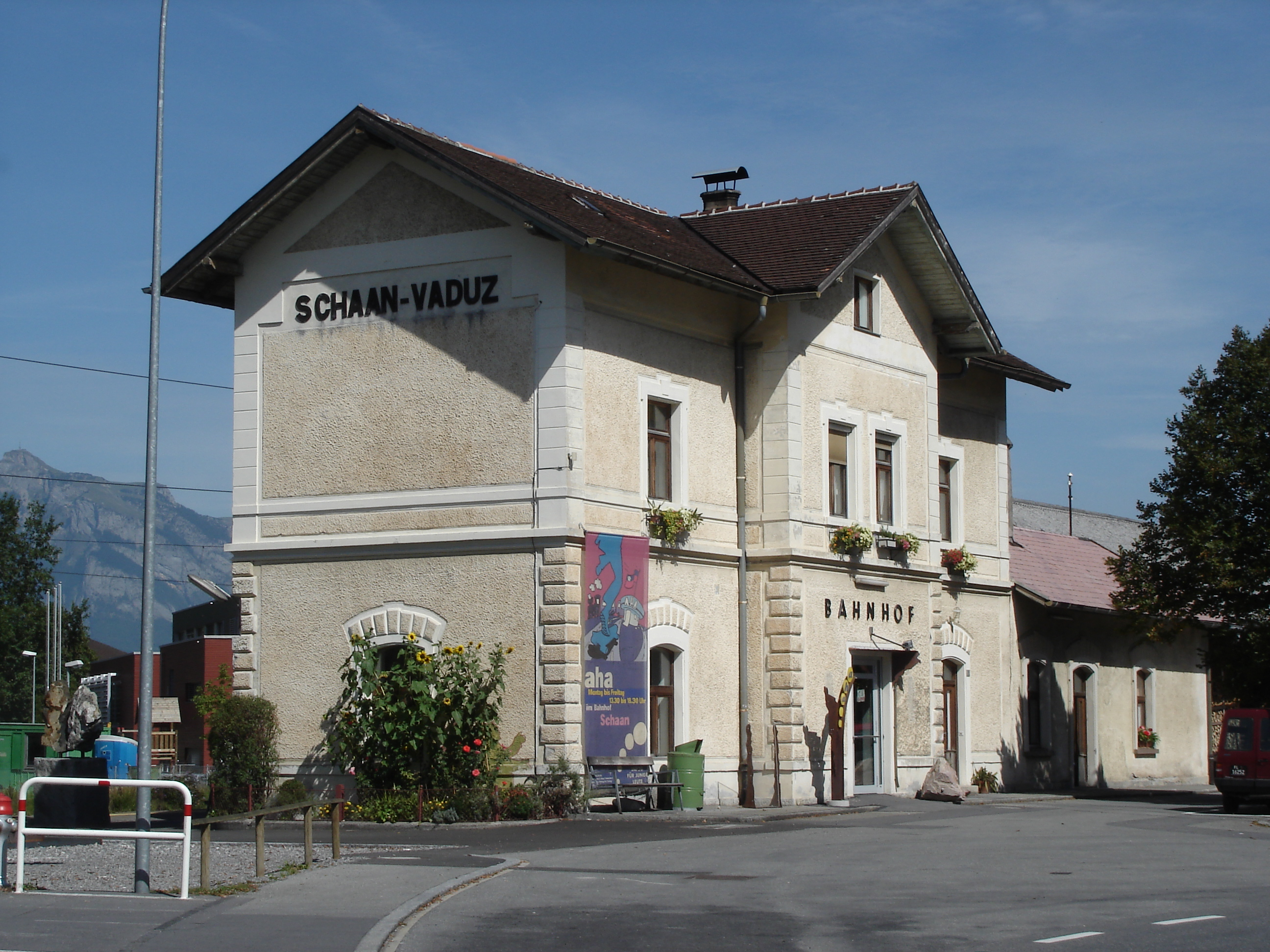
Schaan-Vaduz railway station

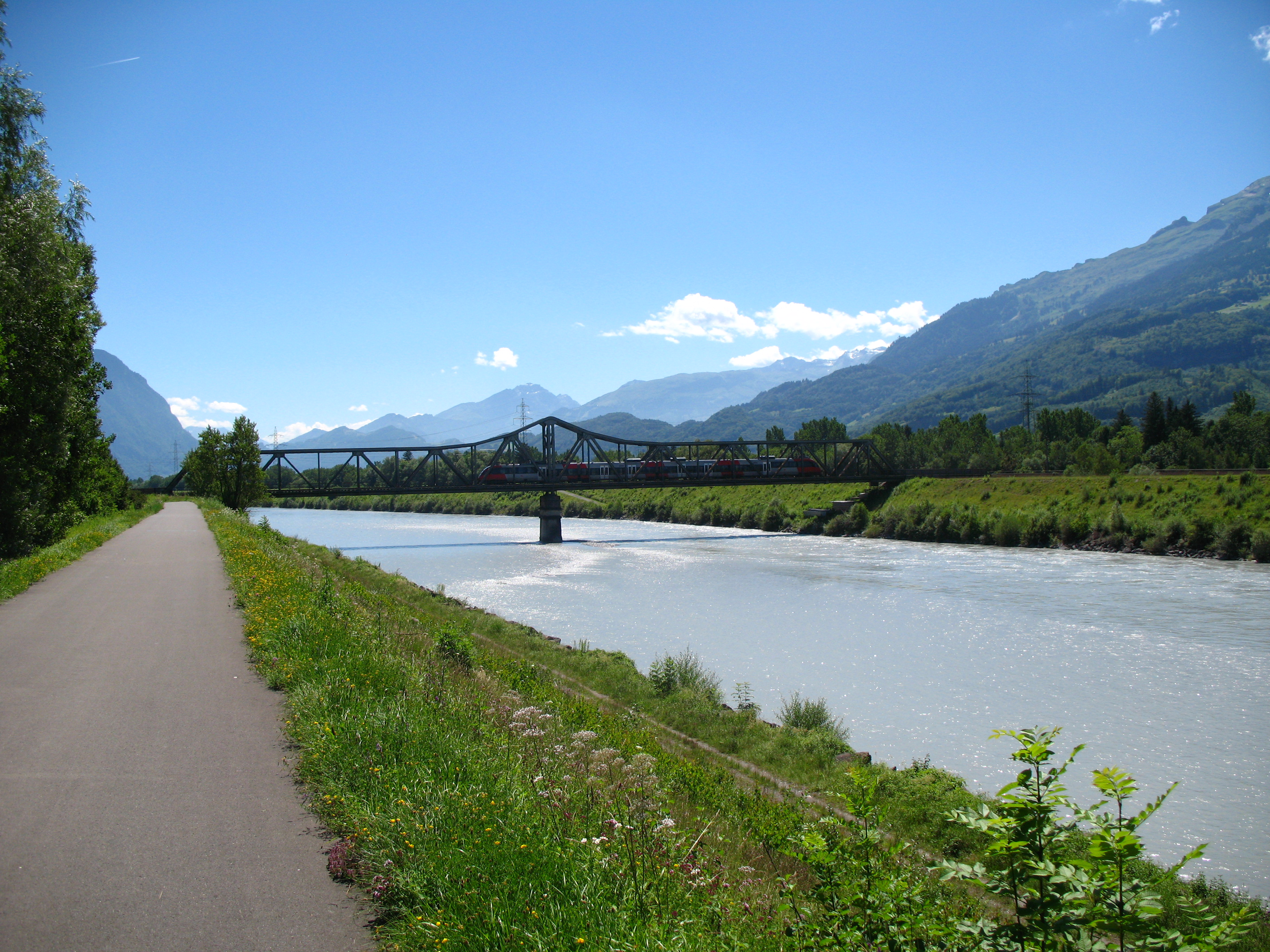
Schaan–Buchs bridge, the only railway bridge between Liechtenstein and Switzerland

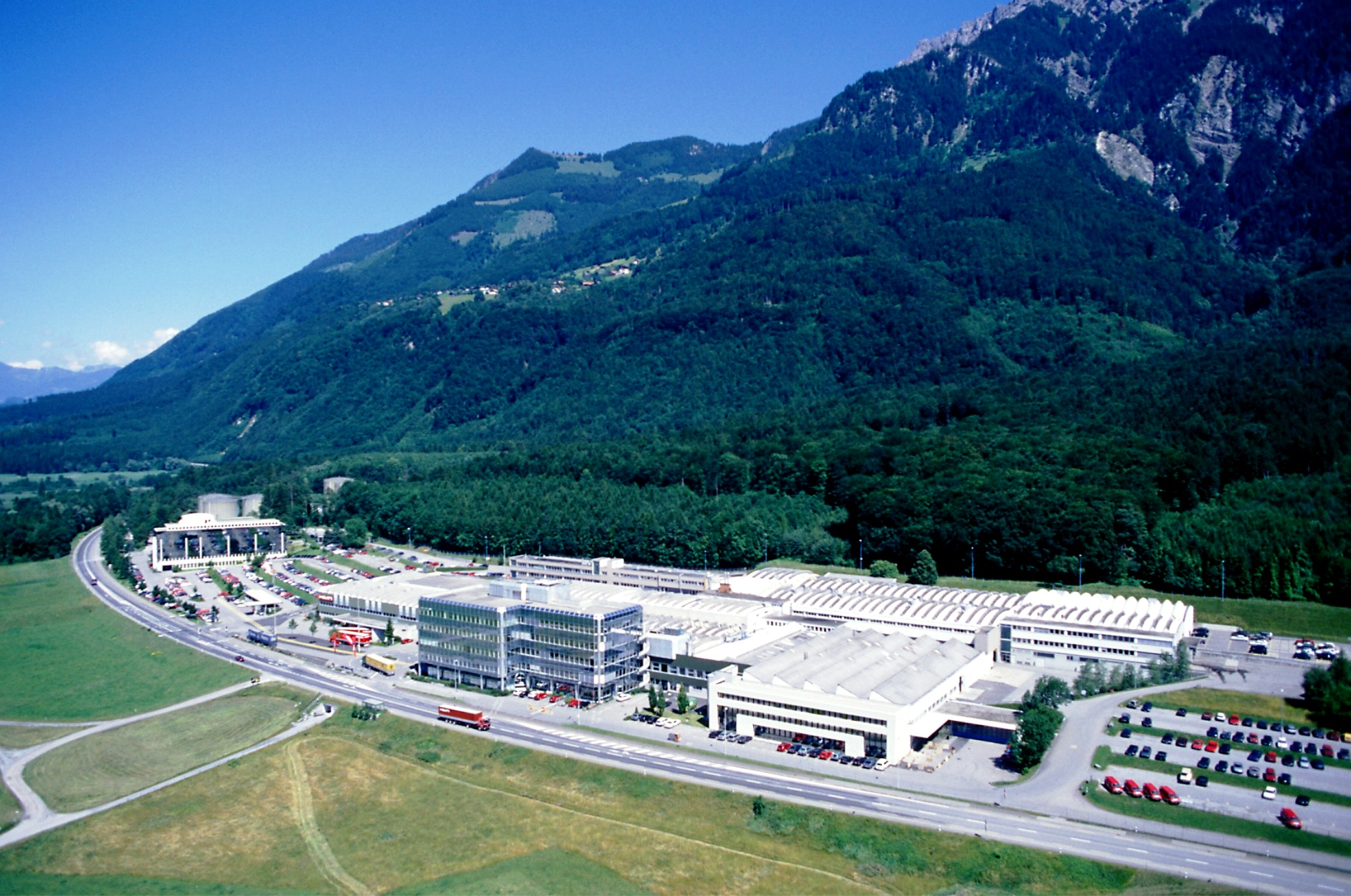
Headquarters of Hilti
