= 1983 Liechtenstein local elections =

← 1979	30 January 1983	1987 →
- Turnout: 90.6%

Local elections were held in Liechtenstein on 30 January 1983 to elect the municipal councils and the mayors of the eleven municipalities. Women were able to vote in Gamprin for first time.

== Election system ==
The municipal councils (German: Gemeinderat) are composed of an even number of councillors plus the mayor (German: Gemeindevorsteher). The number of councillors is determined by population count: 6 councillors for population under 500; 8 councillors for population between 500 and 1,500; 10 councillors for population between 1,500 and 3,000; and 12 councillors for population over 3,000.

Councillors were elected in single multi-member districts, consisting of the municipality's territory, using an open list proportional representation system. Voting was on the basis of male suffrage in a secret ballot, except in Gamprin and Vaduz, where women's suffrage was previously introduced. The mayors were elected in a two-round system. If none of the candidates achieved a majority in the first round, a second round would have been held four weeks later, where the candidate with a plurality would be elected as a mayor.

== Results ==
=== Summary ===
Party	Votes		Mayors		Seats	
Party	Votes	%	Total	+/–	Total	+/–
Progressive Citizens' Party	32,971	52.8	7	▼1	65	▲3
Patriotic Union	29,509	47.2	4	▲1	52	▼1
Total	62,480	100	11	–	117	–
Valid ballots	5,832	97.2				
Invalid/blank ballots	170	2.8				
Total	6,002	100				
Registered voters/turnout	6,625	90.6				
Source: Statistisches Jahrbuch 1999, p.356-367, Liechtensteiner Volksblatt

=== Mayoral elections ===
Municipality	Party	Candidate	Votes
Balzers	Progressive Citizens' Party	Emanuel Vogt	343
Balzers	Patriotic Union	Kuno Frick	299
Eschen	Patriotic Union	Egon Marxer	309
Eschen	Progressive Citizens' Party	Pius Batliner	254
Gamprin	Progressive Citizens' Party	Lorenz Hasler	297
Mauren	Progressive Citizens' Party	Hartwig Kieber	287
Mauren	Patriotic Union	Norbert Oehri	171
Planken	Progressive Citizens' Party	Eugen Beck	48
Ruggell	Patriotic Union	Anton Hoop	142
Ruggell	Progressive Citizens' Party	Hugo Oehri	135
Schaan	Progressive Citizens' Party	Lorenz Schierscher	524
Schaan	Patriotic Union	Peter Walser	228
Schellenberg	Progressive Citizens' Party	Edgar Elkuch	104
Triesen	Patriotic Union	Rudolf Kindle	349
Triesen	Progressive Citizens' Party	Peter Banzer	189
Triesenberg	Patriotic Union	Alfons Schädler	291
Vaduz	Progressive Citizens' Party	Arthur Konrad	1270
Source: Liechtensteiner Volksblatt

=== Municipal council elections ===
Constituency	Seats	Party	Candidates	Votes	Seats	+/–
Balzers	12	Patriotic Union	Anton Bürzle; Hanspeter Foser; Fidel Frick; Reinold Frick; Anton Kaufmann; Andreas Nägele; Othmar Vogt; Josef Büchel; Hubert Eberle; Ewald Vogt; Louis Vogt; Baptist Wille	4,210	7	▲1
Balzers	12	Progressive Citizens' Party	Christian Brunhart; Arthur Frick; Baptist Frick; Dominik Frick; Johann Vogt; David Büchel; Erwin Büchel; Eugen Büchel; Guido Frick; Edgar Nipp; Ferdinand Vogt; Josef Vogt	3,722	5	▲1
Eschen	10	Progressive Citizens' Party	Hugo Allgäuer; Pius Batliner; Herbert Fehr; Josef Kranz; Walter Meier; Elmar Batliner; Ferdi Kranz; Donat Marxer; Herbert Meier; Robert Wanger	3,037	5	0
Eschen	10	Patriotic Union	Werner Gstöhl; Raimund Hoop; Ludwig Kranz; Herbert Meier; Ferdi Wanger; Adolf Gerner; Quido Hasler; Oswald Marxer; Ernst Wohlwend; Hugo Wohlwend	2,633	5	0
Gamprin	8	Progressive Citizens' Party	Alfred Hasler; Kuno Hasler; Alois Kind; Maria Marxer; Hubert Müssner; Bruno Hasler; Quido Hasler; Felix Hassler	1,741	5	0
Gamprin	8	Patriotic Union	Peter Marxer; Elsa Oehri; Franz Oehri; Oswald Kind	1,099	3	0
Mauren	10	Progressive Citizens' Party	Arthur Gassner; Georg Kieber; Pius Mündle; Heinz Ritter; Herbert Ritter; Ernst Senti; Ambros Kaiser; Norbert Marock; Werner Marxer; Hanno Meier	2,787	6	0
Mauren	10	Patriotic Union	Walter Marxer; Tilbert Meier; Norbert Oehri; Norbert Ritter; Alois Beck; Leo Heeb; Ewald Marxer; Quido Marxer; Elmar Mündle; Heinz Ritter	1,763	4	0
Planken	6	Progressive Citizens' Party	August Beck; Siegwin Ganter; Gustav Jehle; Peter Ospelt; Manfred Wanger; Hans Risch	245	5	0
Planken	6	Patriotic Union	Heinrich Gantner; Horst Meier	67	1	0
Ruggell	8	Progressive Citizens' Party	Ernst Büchel; Viktor Büchel; Josef Hoop; Paul Kind; Walter Kind; Engelbert Marxer; Hanspeter Spalt; Johann Walch	1,112	5	0
Ruggell	8	Patriotic Union	Donat Büchel; Otto Büchel; Norbert Heeb; Pius Biedermann; Erich Büchel; Ludwig Büchel; Heinrich Hoop; Martin Oehri	1,096	3	0
Schaan	12	Progressive Citizens' Party	David Falk; Noldi Frick; Martin Jehle; Richard Schierscher; Herbert Walser; Hugo Walser; Noldi Wanger; Christoph Frommelt; Hubert Kaufmann; Eugen Kranz; Rainer Ospelt; Sepp Wanger	5,237	7	▲1
Schaan	12	Patriotic Union	Adolf Hilti; Bruno Nipp; Hans Quaderer; Roland Wachter; Werner Wenaweser; Ludwig Frick; Roman Frick; Wolfgang Frick; Kaspar Hilti; Alfons Kaiser; Karl Wohlwend; Peter Walser	3,679	5	▼1
Schellenberg	8	Progressive Citizens' Party	Alexander Goop; Georg Hassler; Hubert Kaiser; German Wohlwend; Xaver Biedermann; Josef Büchel; Walfried Goop; Helmuth Kieber	695	4	0
Schellenberg	8	Patriotic Union	Walter Kieber; Max Lampert; Worner Meier; Franz Wohlwend; Peter Büchel; Walter Brendle; Hans Oehri; Armin Wohlwend	489	4	0
Triesen	10	Patriotic Union	Arthur Bargetze; August Beck; Heinrich Hoch; Elmar Negele; Walter Schädler; Horst Erne; Wolfgang Kindle; Elmar Schurte; Engelbert Schurte; Ferdi Sprenger	3,199	5	0
Triesen	10	Progressive Citizens' Party	Peter Banzer; Othmar Eberle; Xaver Hoch; Albert Kindle; Lorenz Kindle; Gaston Frommelt; Engelbert Marogg; Silvio Marogg; Peter Schurte; Wilfried Sprenger	2,321	5	0
Triesenberg	10	Patriotic Union	Egon Bühler; Josef Eberle; Xaver Eberle; Eugen Gassner; Josef Gassner; Bertram Beck; Daniel Beck; Erwin Beck; Josef Beck; Theo Beck	2,674	5	▼1
Triesenberg	10	Progressive Citizens' Party	Marzell Beck; Paul Gassner; Herbert Hilbe; Julius Nägele; Engelbert Schädler; Daniel Beck; Josef Schädler; Simon Beck; Ulrich Beck; Franz Schädler	1,966	5	▲1
Vaduz	12	Progressive Citizens' Party	Alois Ospelt; Willy Oehri; Bernhard Ospelt; Hans Thöny; Werner Verling; Adolf Wachter; Xaver Frick; Monika Lampert; Franz Marxer; Anton Näscher; Peter Ospelt; Albrecht Wolf	10,512	6	▼1
Vaduz	12	Patriotic Union	Hugo Biedermann; Emma Brogle; Kurt Frommelt; Werner Hemmerle; Norbert Vogt; Ernst Walser; Werner Frick; Arnold Gassner; Wolfgang Gassner; Reinold Ospelt; Herbert Schädler; Theobald Wille	8,196	6	▲1
Source: Liechtensteiner Volksblatt
