= 1991 Liechtenstein local elections =

- 27 January 1991 (first round); 10 February 1991 (second round)
- Turnout: 85.8%

Local elections were held in Liechtenstein on 27 January and 10 February 1991 to elect the municipal councils and the mayors of the eleven municipalities.

== Election system ==
The municipal councils (German: Gemeinderat) are composed of an even number of councillors plus the mayor (German: Gemeindevorsteher). The number of councillors is determined by population count: 6 councillors for population under 500; 8 councillors for population between 500 and 1,500; 10 councillors for population between 1,500 and 3,000; and 12 councillors for population over 3,000.

Councillors were elected in single multi-member districts, consisting of the municipality's territory, using an open list proportional representation system. Voting was on the basis of universal suffrage in a secret ballot. The mayors were elected in a two-round system. If none of the candidates achieved a majority in the first round, a second round would have been held four weeks later, where the candidate with a plurality would be elected as a mayor.

== Results ==
=== Summary ===
Party	Votes		Mayors		Seats	
Party	Votes	%	Total	+/–	Total	+/–
Progressive Citizens' Party	55,810	47.7	6	▼1	60	▼1
Patriotic Union	53,354	45.6	5	▲1	53	▼1
Non-Party List	4,376	3.7	0	New	2	0
Free List	2,264	2.3	0	New	2	▲2
Free List–Non-Party List (FL-ÜLL)	896	0.8	0	New	0	New
Total	117,100	100	11	–	117	–
Valid ballots	11,195	95.4				
Invalid/blank ballots	535	4.6				
Total	11,730	100				
Registered voters/turnout	13,669	85.8				
Source: Statistisches Jahrbuch 1999, p.356-367, Liechtensteiner Volksblatt

=== Mayoral elections ===
==== First round ====
Municipality	Party	Candidate	Votes
Balzers	Patriotic Union	Othmar Vogt	887
Balzers	Progressive Citizens' Party	Franz Büchel	569
Eschen	Patriotic Union	Günther Wohlwend	730
Eschen	Progressive Citizens' Party	Norbert Batliner	654
Gamprin	Progressive Citizens' Party	Maria Marxer	250
Gamprin	Patriotic Union	Paul Büchel	150
Mauren	Progressive Citizens' Party	Johannes Kaiser	650
Mauren	Patriotic Union	Manfred Biedermann	382
Planken	Progressive Citizens' Party	Eugen Beck	134
Ruggell	Patriotic Union	Anton Hoop	372
Ruggell	Progressive Citizens' Party	Herbert Kind	280
Schaan	Progressive Citizens' Party	Hansjakob Falk	906
Schaan	Patriotic Union	Hans Quaderer	763
Schaan	Free List	Hansjörg Hilti	183
Schellenberg	Patriotic Union	Walter Kieber	221
Schellenberg	Progressive Citizens' Party	German Wohlwend	124
Triesen	Progressive Citizens' Party	Xaver Hoch	814
Triesen	Patriotic Union	Florian Kindle	456
Triesenberg	Patriotic Union	Herbert Hilbe	848
Triesenberg	Non-Party List	Hans-Walter Schädler	245
Vaduz	Progressive Citizens' Party	Arthur Konrad	804
Vaduz	Patriotic Union	Alois Ospelt	389
Vaduz	För Vaduz	Hilmar Ospelt	324
Vaduz	Non-Party List	Rainer Ospelt	109
Source: Liechtensteiner Volksblatt

==== Second round ====
Municipality	Party	Candidate	Votes
Schaan	Progressive Citizens' Party	Hansjakob Falk	1004
Schaan	Patriotic Union	Hans Quaderer	716
Vaduz	Progressive Citizens' Party	Arthur Konrad	907
Vaduz	Patriotic Union	Alois Ospelt	430
Source: Liechtensteiner Volksblatt

=== Municipal council elections ===
Constituency	Seats	Party	Candidates	Votes	Seats
Balzers	12	Patriotic Union	Mario Frick; Nikolaus Nipp; Heribert Vogt; Louis Vogt; Werner Vogt; Guido Wolfinger; Elfriede Fassold-Büchel; Bruno Foser; Doris Frick; Robert Kaufmann; Alfred Vogt; Reinhart Wolfinger	9,120	6
Balzers	12	Progressive Citizens' Party	Franz Büchel; Andreas Frick; Elmar Frick; Hanspeter Frick; Maria Thöny-Frick; Christian Brunhart; Eugen Frick; Emil Nigg; Eugen Nipp; Inge Risch-Frick; Ferdinand Vogt; René Vogt	7,150	5
Balzers	12	Free List	Norbert Brunhart; Paul Vogt; Markus Wille	1,814	1
Eschen	10	Patriotic Union	Ludwig Kranz; Paul Ott; Manfred Frick; Gustav Gstöhl; Arnold Hoop; Christl Gstöhl; Norbert Marxer; Hedy Risch; Freddy Gstöhl; Lydia Karl-Beck; Bruno Wohlwend	6,721	5
Eschen	10	Progressive Citizens' Party	Kurt Gerner; Werner Bieberschulte; Michael Gerner; Marlies Amann; Christl Gstöhl; Paul Eberle; Karlheinz Walser; Simon Schächle; Ilse-Karolina Frommelt-Wohlwend; Mary Senti	6,249	5
Gamprin	8	Progressive Citizens' Party	Hubert Büchel; Norman Elkuch; Armin Hasler; Kuno Hasler; Rainer Marxer; Egon Rheinberger	1,911	4
Gamprin	8	Patriotic Union	Paul Büchel; Rolf Hasler; Helmuth Kind; Ludwig Sprenger; Kurt Meier; Wilfried Öhri	1,481	4
Mauren	10	Progressive Citizens' Party	Ferdy Kaiser; Josef Kaiser; Peter Malin; Arnold Matt; Gerold Matt; Paul Matt; Helga Marxer; Rainer Marxer; Gert Meier; Rita Meier	6,367	6
Mauren	10	Patriotic Union	Rainer Batliner; Tilbert Meier; Gebhard Öhri; Klemens Öhri; Otto Matt; Lore Schreiber-Mayer; Gerhard Meier; Annemarie Mündle-Lampert; Hubert Nutt; Otto-Hans Ritter	3,763	4
Planken	6	Progressive Citizens' Party	Marxer Walter; Lorenz Nägele; Hans Risch; Ganter-Wichser Liselotte; Ganter Hanspeter; Christel Wanger	645	3
Planken	6	Patriotic Union	Norbert Gantner; Horst Meier	219	2
Ruggell	8	Progressive Citizens' Party	Markus Büchel; Rudolf Hoop; Johannes Matt; Bertram Öhri; Karl Walch; Hans Öhri; Ronald Öhri	2,677	5
Ruggell	8	Patriotic Union	Jakob Büchel; Siegfried Hasler; Herlinde Öhri; Ludwig Büchel; Blanca Grassmayr; Josef Gschwenter; Werner Matt; Ewald Öhry	2,603	3
Schaan	12	Progressive Citizens' Party	Quido Eberle; Albert Frick; Doris Kindle-Frommelt; Martin Jehle; Hano Konrad; Günther Wanger; Lorenz Frommelt; Xaver Jehle; Franz Risch; Hans-Peter Tschütscher; Martin Walser; Daniel Wenaweser	10,670	6
Schaan	12	Patriotic Union	Karl Dünser; Gilbert Frommelt; Lorenz Heeb; Franz Hilti; Peter Walser; Peter Batliner; Otto Frick; Kaspar Hilti; Werner Kaufmann; Christian Lingg; Monika Rohrer-Nutt; Herma Sele-Thöny	8,922	5
Schaan	12	Free List	Pepo Frick; Evelyne Bermann; Nikolaus Frick; Käthi Frommelt-Bernegger; Hildegard Hasler-Walk; Claudia Heeb-Fleck; Roland Hilti; Elisabeth Hoop-Bagladi; Ingrid Kaufmann-Sele; Dietmar Näscher; Nicolaus Ruther; Sonja Wachter-Hirsiger	2,562	1
Schellenberg	8	Progressive Citizens' Party	Josef Büchel; Engelbert Hasler; Elmar Öhri; Hansjörg Risch; German Wohlwend; Christoph Biedermann; Maria-Theres Biedermann; Erich Elkuch	1,406	5
Schellenberg	8	Patriotic Union	Goop Caroline; Mina Wohlwend; Edi Hassler; Erich Biedermann; Hans-Jörg Goop; Max Lampert; Walter Lampert; Franz Wohlwend	1,378	3
Triesen	10	Progressive Citizens' Party	Theodor Banzer; Christa Heidegger; Gebhard Hoch; Gebhard Kindle; Lorenz Kindle; Robert Eberle; Albert Kindle; Mario Negele; Paul Schurte; Gebi Schurti	6,029	5
Triesen	10	Patriotic Union	Ludwig Bargetze; Franz-Josef Beck; Remo Beck; André Kindle; Florian Kindle Jr.; Herbert Banzer; Inge Büchel-Breitenbaumer; Harald Erne; Karl Feger; Albin Hoch	5,565	5
Triesen	10	Free List–Non-Party List	Gerda Bicker-Brunhart; Maria Madl-Sprenger; Albert Eberle; René Hasler; Konrad Kindle; Peter Kindle	896	0
Triesenberg	10	Patriotic Union	Erich Beck; Ulrich Beck; Siegfried Gassner; Anton Schädler; Norbert Schädler; Wendelin Schädler; David Schädler; Inmgard Schädler; Leopold Schädler; Maria Schädler	6,122	6
Triesenberg	10	Progressive Citizens' Party	Bapist Beck; Xaver Eberle; Reinhold Bühler; Theo Gassner; Elsi Schädler; Valentin Beck; Viktor Nipp; Martha Tschikof-Bühler	3,456	3
Triesenberg	10	Non-Party List	Hans Walter-Schädler; Gertrud Fehr-Bühler; Reinhilde Beck-Sele; Joachim Beck	1,002	1
Vaduz	12	Progressive Citizens' Party	Mortiz Gassner; Hans Lorenz Jr.; Arthur Ospelt; Franz Ospelt; Werner Seger; Peter Sele; Leni Auwärter-Kranz; Wilma Ehret-Kaiser; Ida Hasler-Beck; Ernst-Erich Ospelt; Helga Ospelt; Anneros Theiner-Wolf	9,324	6
Vaduz	12	Patriotic Union	Walter Hartmann; Werner Hemmerle; Alois Ospelt; Max Ospelt; Franz Wachter; Annelies Breuss; Barbara Hagen; Annelore Oehry; Waltraud Schlegel; Alfons Thöny; Leo Verling; René Wille	7,386	5
Vaduz	12	Non-Party List	Rainer Ospelt; Claudia Lins; Thaddäus Wachter; Kunibert Ospelt; Josef Büchel; Leo Sele	1,662	1
Vaduz	12	Free List	Anja Fasel-Schreiber; Elsbeth Büchel; Clemens Laternser; Kaspar Frick; Hugo Risch; Helmuth Marxer	1,404	0
Source: Liechtensteiner Volksblatt, Liechtensteiner Volksblatt
