= 1995 Liechtenstein local elections =

- 29 January 1995
- Turnout: 83.1%

Local elections were held in Liechtenstein on 29 January 1995 to elect the municipal councils and the mayors of the eleven municipalities.

== Election system ==
The municipal councils (German: Gemeinderat) are composed of an even number of councillors plus the mayor (German: Gemeindevorsteher). The number of councillors is determined by population count: 6 councillors for population under 500; 8 councillors for population between 500 and 1,500; 10 councillors for population between 1,500 and 3,000; and 12 councillors for population over 3,000.

Councillors were elected in single multi-member districts, consisting of the municipality's territory, using an open list proportional representation system. Voting was on the basis of universal suffrage in a secret ballot. The mayors were elected in a two-round system. If none of the candidates achieved a majority in the first round, a second round would have been held four weeks later, where the candidate with a plurality would be elected as a mayor.

== Results ==
=== Summary ===
Party	Votes		Mayors		Seats	
Party	Votes	%	Total	+/–	Total	+/–
Patriotic Union	58,290	46.1	7	▲1	59	▼1
Progressive Citizens' Party	58,079	45.9	4	▼1	56	▲3
Free List	9,011	7.1	0	0	5	▲3
Non-Party List	1,039	0.8	0	0	1	▼1
Total	126,419	100	11	–	121	–
Valid ballots	11,477	97.0				
Invalid/blank ballots	361	3.0				
Total	11,838	100				
Registered voters/turnout	14,247	83.1				
Source: Statistisches Jahrbuch 1999, p.356-367, Liechtensteiner Volksblatt

=== Mayoral elections ===
Municipality	Party	Candidate	Votes
Balzers	Patriotic Union	Othmar Vogt	811
Balzers	Progressive Citizens' Party	Adolf Frick	670
Eschen	Patriotic Union	Günther Wohlwend	847
Eschen	Progressive Citizens' Party	Zeno Marxer	482
Gamprin	Patriotic Union	Donath Oehri	255
Gamprin	Progressive Citizens' Party	Maria Marxer	220
Mauren	Progressive Citizens' Party	Johannes Kaiser	967
Planken	Progressive Citizens' Party	Eugen Beck	118
Ruggell	Patriotic Union	Anton Hoop	357
Ruggell	Progressive Citizens' Party	Johannes Matt	322
Schaan	Progressive Citizens' Party	Hansjakob Falk	1246
Schaan	Patriotic Union	Rony Walser	466
Schellenberg	Patriotic Union	Walter Kieber	205
Schellenberg	Progressive Citizens' Party	Rudolf Goop	148
Triesen	Progressive Citizens' Party	Xaver Hoch	764
Triesen	Patriotic Union	Hubert Hoch	528
Triesenberg	Patriotic Union	Herbert Hilbe	593
Triesenberg	Progressive Citizens' Party	Louis Gassner	497
Vaduz	Patriotic Union	Karlheinz Ospelt	938
Vaduz	Progressive Citizens' Party	Werner Ospelt	738
Source: Liechtensteiner Volksblatt
