= 1987 Liechtenstein local elections =

- 25 January 1987
- Turnout: 87.9%

Local elections were held in Liechtenstein on 25 January 1987 to elect the municipal councils and the mayors of the eleven municipalities. These were the first local elections where women were able to vote in all the municipalities.

== Election system ==
The municipal councils (German: Gemeinderat) are composed of an even number of councillors plus the mayor (German: Gemeindevorsteher). The number of councillors is determined by population count: 6 councillors for population under 500; 8 councillors for population between 500 and 1,500; 10 councillors for population between 1,500 and 3,000; and 12 councillors for population over 3,000.

Councillors were elected in single multi-member districts, consisting of the municipality's territory, using an open list proportional representation system. Voting was on the basis of universal suffrage in a secret ballot. The mayors were elected in a two-round system. If none of the candidates achieved a majority in the first round, a second round would have been held four weeks later, where the candidate with a plurality would be elected as a mayor.

== Results ==
=== Summary ===
Party	Votes		Mayors		Seats	
Party	Votes	%	Total	+/–	Total	+/–
Progressive Citizens' Party	55,858	47.7	7	0	61	▼4
Patriotic Union	53,806	45.8	4	0	54	▲2
Non-Party List	3,616	1.6	0	New	2	New
Free List	1,659	4.9	0	New	0	New
Total	114,939	100	11	–	117	–
Valid ballots	10,841	97.4				
Invalid/blank ballots	289	2.6				
Total	11,130	100				
Registered voters/turnout	12,660	87.9				
Source: Statistisches Jahrbuch 1999, p.356-367, Liechtensteiner Volksblatt

=== By municipality ===
Municipality	Party	Candidate	Votes
Balzers	Patriotic Union	Othmar Vogt	765
Balzers	Progressive Citizens' Party	Walter Gstöhl	629
Eschen	Progressive Citizens' Party	Beat Marxer	640
Eschen	Patriotic Union	Raimund Hoop	635
Gamprin	Progressive Citizens' Party	Lorenz Hasler	297
Mauren	Progressive Citizens' Party	Hartwig Kieber	720
Planken	Progressive Citizens' Party	Eugen Beck	116
Ruggell	Patriotic Union	Anton Hoop	313
Ruggell	Progressive Citizens' Party	Herbert Kind	309
Schaan	Progressive Citizens' Party	Lorenz Schierscher	1066
Schaan	Patriotic Union	Roman Frick	717
Schellenberg	Patriotic Union	Walter Kieber	157
Schellenberg	Progressive Citizens' Party	Edgar Elkuch	137
Triesen	Progressive Citizens' Party	Xaver Hoch	626
Triesen	Patriotic Union	Rudolf Kindle	602
Triesenberg	Patriotic Union	Herbert Hilbe	848
Vaduz	Progressive Citizens' Party	Arthur Konrad	1280
Source: Liechtensteiner Volksblatt
