= 1979 Liechtenstein local elections =

- 28 January 1979
- Turnout: 91.3%

Local elections were held in Liechtenstein on 28 January 1979 to elect the municipal councils and the mayors of the eleven municipalities. Women were able to vote in Vaduz for first time.

== Election system ==
The municipal councils (German: Gemeinderat) are composed of an even number of councillors plus the mayor (German: Gemeindevorsteher). The number of councillors is determined by population count: 6 councillors for population under 500; 8 councillors for population between 500 and 1,500; 10 councillors for population between 1,500 and 3,000; and 12 councillors for population over 3,000.

Councillors were elected in single multi-member districts, consisting of the municipality's territory, using an open list proportional representation system. Voting was on the basis of male suffrage in a secret ballot, except in Vaduz, where women's suffrage was previously introduced. The mayors were elected in a two-round system. If none of the candidates achieved a majority in the first round, a second round would have been held four weeks later, where the candidate with a plurality would be elected as a mayor.

== Results ==
=== Summary ===
Party	Votes		Mayors		Seats	
Party	Votes	%	Total	+/–	Total	+/–
Progressive Citizens' Party	21,893	51.1	8	▲1	62	▲1
Patriotic Union	20,909	48.9	3	▼1	53	▼1
Total	114,939	100	11	–	115	–
Valid ballots	5,271	98.0				
Invalid/blank ballots	110	2.0				
Total	5,381	100				
Registered voters/turnout	5,960	90.3				
Source: Statistisches Jahrbuch 1999, p.356-367, Liechtensteiner Volksblatt

=== By municipality ===
Municipality	Party	Candidate	Votes
Balzers	Progressive Citizens' Party	Emanuel Vogt	359
Eschen	Patriotic Union	Egon Marxer	278
Gamprin	Progressive Citizens' Party	Lorenz Hasler	123
Mauren	Progressive Citizens' Party	Hartwig Kieber	232
Planken	Progressive Citizens' Party	Anton Nägele	43
Ruggell	Progressive Citizens' Party	Hugo Oehri	128
Schaan	Progressive Citizens' Party	Lorenz Schierscher	416
Schellenberg	Progressive Citizens' Party	Edgar Elkuch	80
Triesen	Patriotic Union	Rudolf Kindle	310
Triesenberg	Patriotic Union	Alfons Schädler	328
Vaduz	Progressive Citizens' Party	Hilmar Ospelt	1276
Source: Liechtensteiner Volksblatt

=== Municipal council elections ===
Constituency	Seats	Party	Candidates	Seats
Balzers	10	Patriotic Union	Willi Wolfinger; Bapist Frick; Adolf Frick; Erwin Büchel	6
Balzers	10	Progressive Citizens' Party	Andreas Vogt; Bapist Wille; Anton Kaufmann; Othmar Vogt; Reinold Frick; Valentin Frick	4
Eschen	10	Patriotic Union	Herbert Meier; Raimund Hoop; Franz Kranz; Anton Gerner; Quido Hasler	5
Eschen	10	Progressive Citizens' Party	Alwin Hasler; Pius Batliner; Raimund Marxer; Herbert Fehr; Anton Batliner	5
Gamprin	8	Progressive Citizens' Party	Alois Kind; Felix Hassler; Alfred Hasler; Jakob Näscher; Gebhard Näscher	5
Gamprin	8	Patriotic Union	Franz Oehri; Oswald Kind; Franz Marxer	3
Mauren	10	Progressive Citizens' Party	Ernst Senti; Egon Oehri; Norbert Marock; Heinz Ritter; Werner Marxer; Pius Mündle	6
Mauren	10	Patriotic Union	Norbert Oehri; Adolf Marxer; Norbert Ritter; Tilbert Meier	4
Planken	6	Progressive Citizens' Party	Eugen Beck; Sigwin Gantner; Jakob Nutt; Hansrudi Sele; August Gantner	5
Planken	6	Patriotic Union	Heinrich Gantner-Nutt	1
Ruggell	8	Patriotic Union	Otto Büchel; Heinrich Hoop; Arnold Hoop; Josef Spalt; Martin Oehri	5
Ruggell	8	Progressive Citizens' Party	Wilfred Büchel; Paul Kind; Ernst Büchel	3
Schaan	12	Progressive Citizens' Party	Noldi Frick; Richard Schierscher; Hugo Walser; David Falk; Hermann Quaderer; Herbert Walser	6
Schaan	12	Patriotic Union	Walter Frick; Gottlieb Hilti; Rudolf Wenaweser; Franz Beck; Roman Frick; Roland Wachter	6
Schellenberg	8	Progressive Citizens' Party	Hubert Kaiser; Xaver Biedermann; Elias Goop; Helmuth Goop	4
Schellenberg	8	Patriotic Union	Leo Büchel; Urban Büchel; Armin Wohlwend; Werner Batliner	4
Triesen	10	Progressive Citizens' Party	Xaver Hoch; Edwin Kindle; Peter Schurti; Julius Risch; Othmar Eberle	5
Triesen	10	Patriotic Union	August Beck; Walter Schädler; Elmar Negele; Heinrich Hoch; Arthur Bargetze	5
Triesenberg	10	Patriotic Union	Herbert Hilbe; Engelbert Beck; Eugen Schädler; Franz Schädler; Otto Eberle; Julius Nägele	6
Triesenberg	10	Progressive Citizens' Party	Franz-Josef Schädler; Helmut Beck; Louis Gassner; Hans Gassner	4
Vaduz	12	Progressive Citizens' Party	Alois Ospelt; Hans Thöny; Werner Verling; Toni Meier; Gert Risch; Adolf Wachter; Luzius Malin	7
Vaduz	12	Patriotic Union	Gustav Verling; Berthold Konrad; Kurt Frommelt; Roman Gassner; Ernst Walser	5
Source: Liechtensteiner Volksblatt
