= Energy in Liechtenstein =

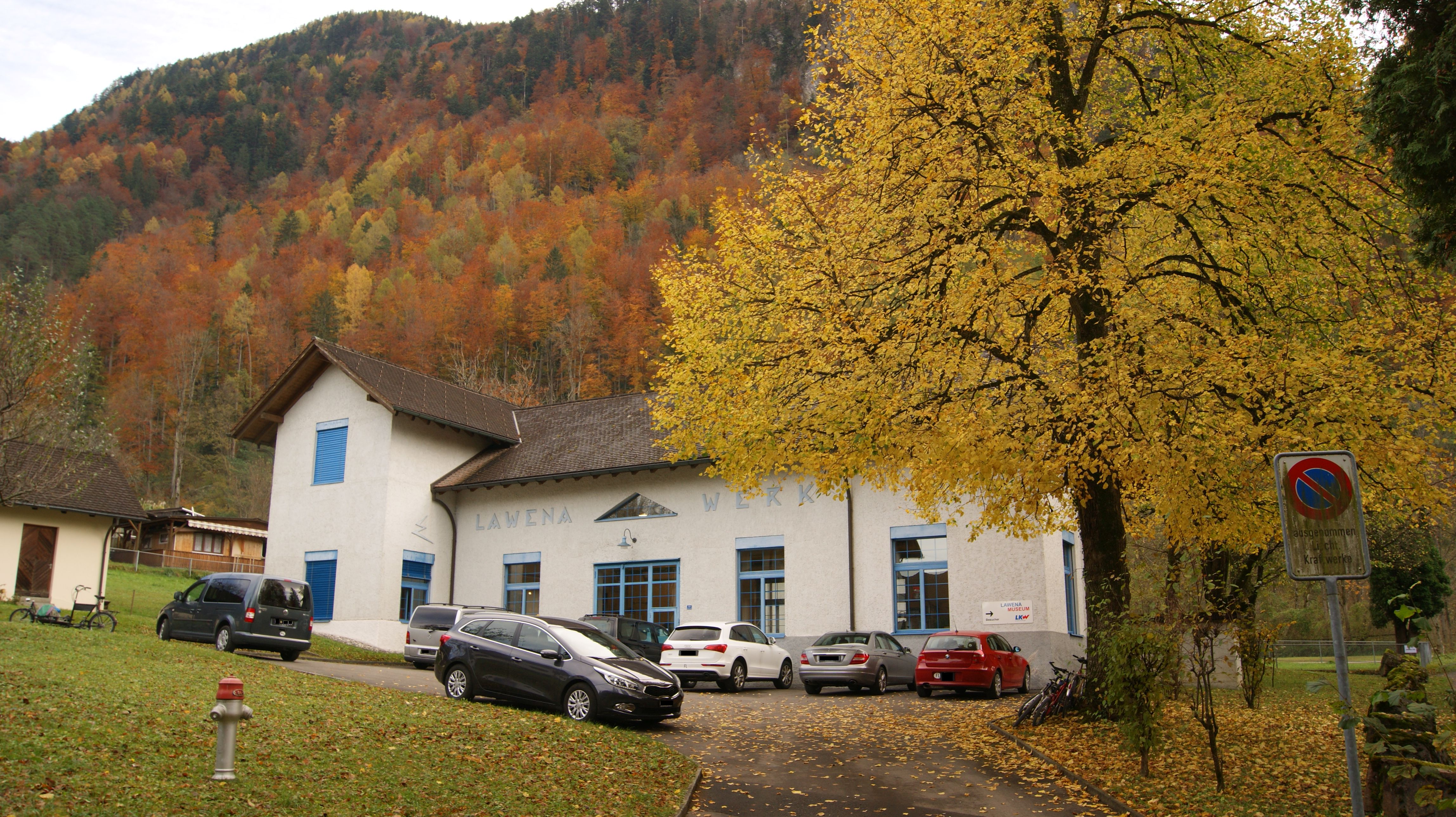
Lawena Power Station in Triesen

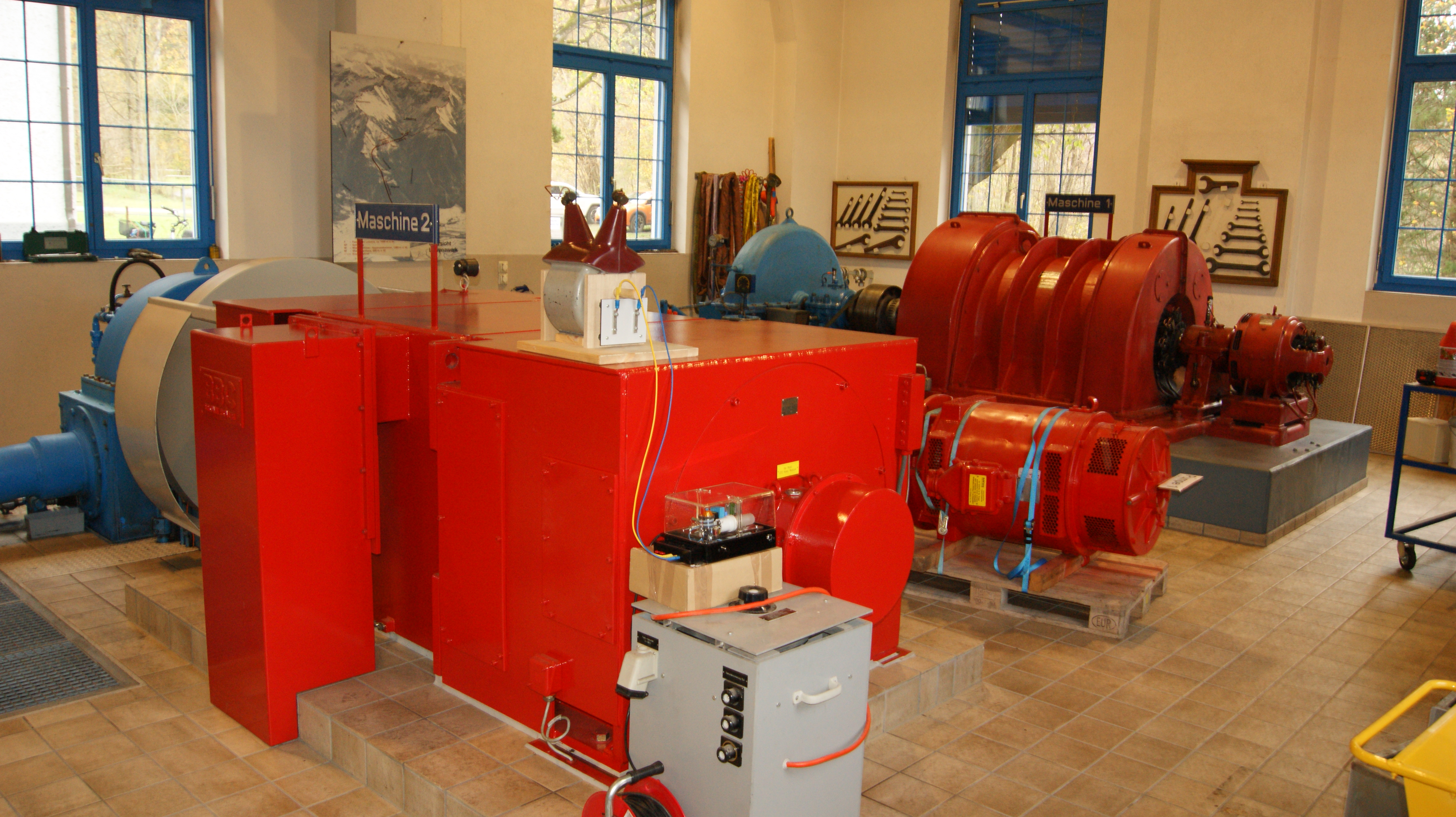
Lawena Power Station in Triesen (interior)

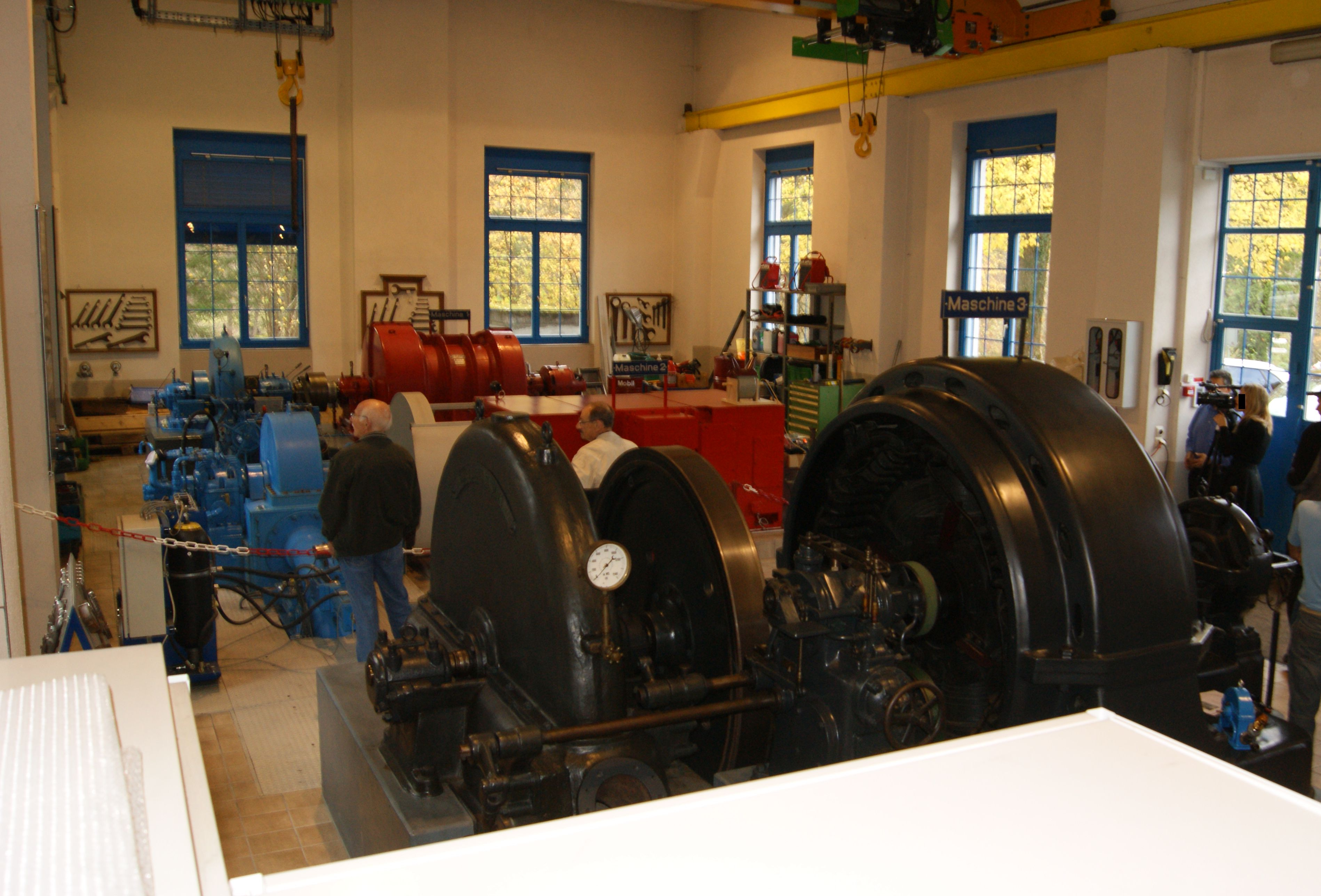
Lawena Power Station in Triesen (interior)

Energy in Liechtenstein describes energy production, consumption and import in Liechtenstein.

Liechtenstein has no domestic sources of fossil fuels and relies on imports of gas and fuels. The country is also a net importer of electricity. In 2016, its domestic energy production covered only slightly under a quarter of the country's electric supply, roughly 24,21 %.

Liechtenstein's national power company is Liechtensteinische Kraftwerke (LKW, Liechtenstein Power Stations), which operates the country's existing power stations, maintains the electric grid and provides related services.

== Overview ==
Energy in Liechtenstein
	Capita	Prim. energy	Production	Import	Electricity	CO_{2}-emission
	Million	TWh	TWh	TWh	TWh	Mt 555
2010						
2012						
2015						
2012 =

== Electricity ==
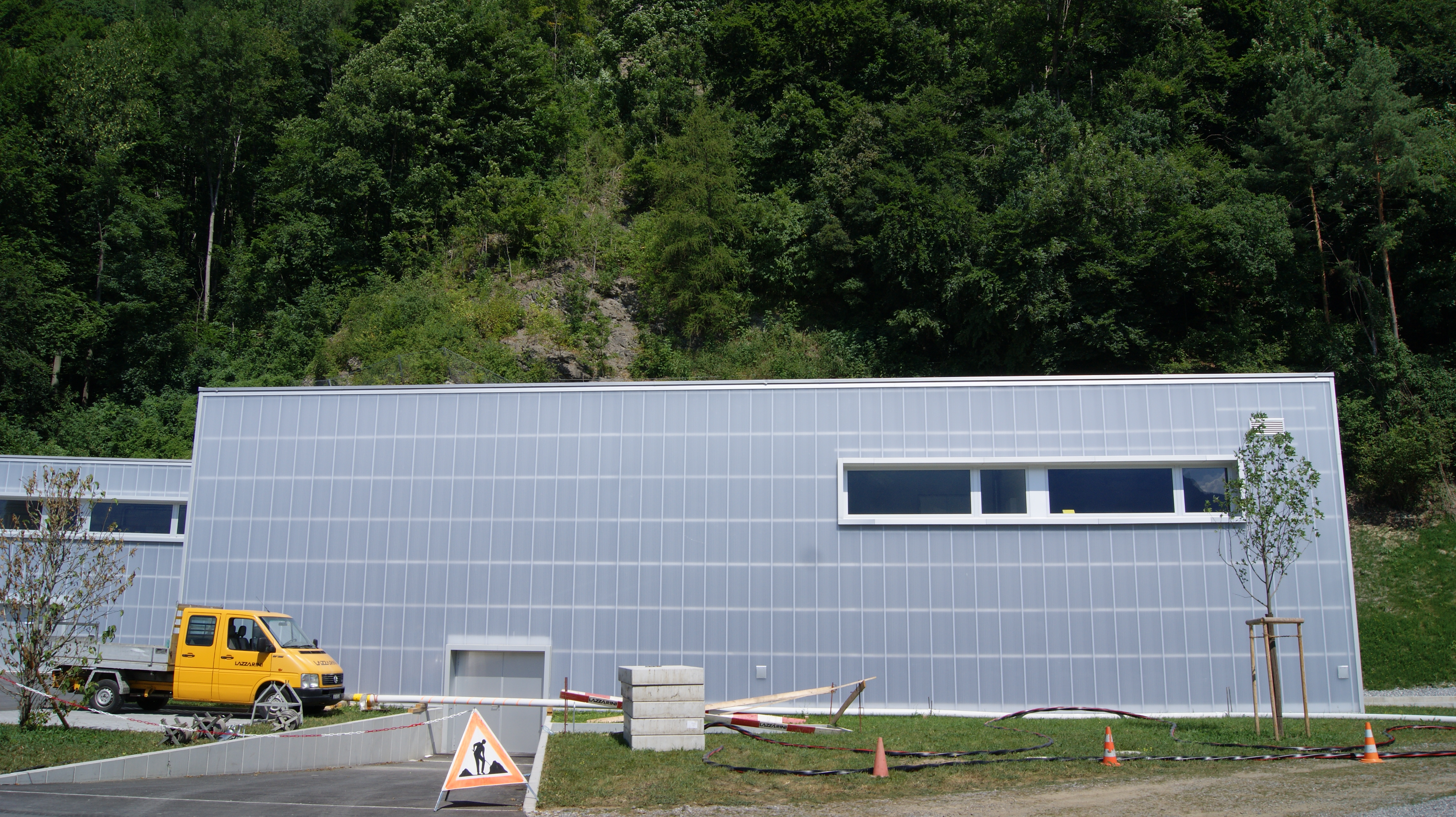
Samina Power Station in Vaduz

In 2010, the country's domestic electricity production amounted to 80,105 MWh.

In 2015, the country's estimated domestic electricity production was around 68,430 MWh.

94.2% of domestic production (76,166 MWh) was provided by hydropower, 3.12% of domestic production (3,330 MWh) was provided by fossil fuels, 2.68% of domestic production (1,361 MWh) was provided by solar or wind power generation, and 0% (0 MWh) by nuclear power generation.

In 2010, imports of electricity to Liechtenstein amounted to roughly 270,540 MWh. None of the domestically generated electric power was exported.

In 2015, imports of electricity to Liechtenstein amounted to roughly 325.2 million kWh. There were again no exports of domestically generated electric power.

In 2016, non-renewable sources accounted for 67,35 % and renewable sources for 32,47 % of Liechtenstein's electricity supply. Energy production from non-renewables consisted of 56,88 % foreign imports of electricity produced by nuclear power, and 0,65 % of electricity produced in Liechtenstein from imported natural gas. Energy production from renewables consisted of 27,71 % hydropower production (8,91 % imported and 18,80 % domestic), as well as 4,76 % produced domestically from solar energy. Liechtenstein's overall energy production from renewables consisted of 8,91 % imports and of 23,56 % domestic, non-export production.

== Renewable energy ==
Energy production from renewable resources accounts for the vast majority of domestically produced electricity in Liechtenstein. Despite efforts to increase renewable energy production, the limited space and infrastructure of the country prevents Liechtenstein from fully covering its domestic needs from renewables only.

=== Hydroelectric ===
Liechtenstein has used hydroelectric power stations since the 1920s as its primary source of domestic energy production. By 2018, the country had 12 hydroelectric power stations in operation (4 conventional/pumped-storage and 8 fresh water power stations). Hydroelectric power production accounted for roughly 18 - 19% of domestic needs.

Name	Location	Municipality	Coordinates	Capacity, MWe	Type
Samina Power Station	Vaduz	Vaduz	47.130228°N 9.524828°E		Pumped-storage (2011-2015 conversion)
Lawena Power Station	Lawena valley	Triesen	47.086°N 9.52784°E		Pumped-storage
Schlosswald Fresh Water Power Station	Vaduz	Vaduz			
Steia Fresh Water Power Station	Nendeln	Eschen			
Letzana Power Station	Triesen	Triesen			
Mühleholz Power Station	Vaduz	Vaduz			
Maree Fresh Water Power Station	Vaduz	Vaduz			
Stieg Fresh Water Power Station	Vaduz	Vaduz			
Wissa Stä Fresh Water Power Station	Planken	Planken			
Wasserchöpfquellen Fresh Water Power Station	Malbun	Triesenberg			
Schaaner Quellen Fresh Water Power Station	Schaan	Schaan			
Meierhof Fresh Water Power Station	Triesen	Triesen			
Kopfquellen Fresh Water Power Station	Balzers	Balzers			

Lawena Power Station is the oldest in the country, opened in 1927. The power station underwent reconstructions in 1946 and 1987. Today, it also includes a small museum on the history of electricity production in Liechtenstein.

Samina Power Station, currently the largest of the domestic power stations, has been operational since December 1949. In 2011-2015, it underwent a reconstruction that converted it into a pumped-storage hydroelectric power station.

=== Solar ===
In recent decades, renewable energy efforts in Liechtenstein have also branched out into solar energy production. Most solar energy is generated by photovoltaic arrays mounted on buildings (usually roofing), rather than dedicated solar power stations. Currently, the largest photovoltaic array in the country is the one atop the Gründenmoos tennis hall, with an installed power output of 112 kWp. Other examples include industrial buildings in Balzers (80 kWp and 70 kWp), a logistics centre in Schaan (86 kWp), an agricultural building in Triesen (40 kWp), and industrial buildings in Vaduz (40 kWp), Schaanwald (36 kWp) and Triesen (30 kWp).

== Consumption ==
In 2010, total consumption of electricity in the Principality of Liechtenstein amounted to roughly 350,645 MWh.

In 2015, total consumption of electricity in the Principality of Liechtenstein amounted to roughly 393.6 million kWh.

== See also ==
- Economy of Liechtenstein
- Renewable energy by country
