= 1975 Liechtenstein local elections =

- 2 February 1975

Local elections were held in Liechtenstein on 2 February 1975 to elect the municipal councils and the mayors of the eleven municipalities. The elections were the first to take place under the revised municipal law of 1974, in which the term of mayors was increased from three to four years and the number of seats in all the municipal councils was increased.

== Election system ==
The municipal councils (German: Gemeinderat) are composed of an even number of councillors plus the mayor (German: Gemeindevorsteher). The number of councillors is determined by population count: 6 councillors for population under 500; 8 councillors for population between 500 and 1,500; 10 councillors for population between 1,500 and 3,000; and 12 councillors for population over 3,000.

Councillors were elected in single multi-member districts, consisting of the municipality's territory, using an open list proportional representation system. Voting was on the basis of male suffrage in a secret ballot. The mayors were elected in a two-round system. If none of the candidates achieved a majority in the first round, a second round would have been held four weeks later, where the candidate with a plurality would be elected as a mayor.

== Mayoral elections results ==
=== Summary ===
Party	Votes	%	Mayors
Progressive Citizens' Party	2,032	54.9	7
Patriotic Union	1,666	45.1	4
Invalid/blank votes	529	–	–
Total	4,227	100	11
Registered voters/turnout	19,558	90.9	–
Source: Statistisches Jahrbuch 1978

=== By municipality ===
Municipality	Electorate	Party	Elected mayor	Votes	%
Balzers	649	Progressive Citizens' Party	Emanuel Vogt	316	54.3
Balzers	649	Patriotic Union	–	266	45.7
Eschen	506	Patriotic Union	Egon Marxer	270	58.8
Eschen	506	Progressive Citizens' Party	–	189	41.2
Gamprin	161	Progressive Citizens' Party	Lorenz Hasler	96	64.9
Gamprin	161	Patriotic Union	–	52	35.1
Mauren	448	Progressive Citizens' Party	Werner Matt	210	100
Planken	50	Progressive Citizens' Party	Anton Nägele	48	100
Ruggell	258	Progressive Citizens' Party	Hugo Oehri	131	52.8
Ruggell	258	Patriotic Union	–	117	47.2
Schaan	728	Progressive Citizens' Party	Walter Beck	341	55.7
Schaan	728	Patriotic Union	–	271	44.3
Schellenberg	132	Patriotic Union	Hermann Hassler	88	100
Triesen	519	Patriotic Union	Rudolf Kindle	276	59.7
Triesen	519	Progressive Citizens' Party	–	186	40.3
Triesenberg	481	Patriotic Union	Alfons Schädler	326	100
Vaduz	720	Progressive Citizens' Party	Hilmar Ospelt	519	100
Source: Statistisches Jahrbuch 1978

== Municipal council elections results ==
=== Overall ===
← Summary of the 1975 Liechtenstein local elections results →
Party	Votes		Seats	Mayors
Party	Votes	%	Seats	Mayors
Progressive Citizens' Party (FBPL)	21,893	51.1	61	7
Patriotic Union (VU)	20,909	48.9	54	4
Total	42,802	100	115	11
Valid ballots	4,156	97.8		
Invalid/blank ballots	92	2.2		
Total	4,248	100		
Registered voters/turnout	4,652	91.3		
Source: Statistisches Jahrbuch 1999, p.356-367

=== Results by municipality ===
Municipality	FBPL		VU	
Municipality	%	C	%	C
Balzers	45.4	5	54.6	6
Eschen	50.4	6	49.6	5
Gamprin	55.1	5	44.9	4
Mauren	60.2	7	39.8	4
Planken	75.7	6	24.3	1
Ruggell	48.1	4	51.9	5
Schaan	52.4	7	47.6	6
Schellenberg	49.6	4	50.4	5
Triesen	45.9	5	54.1	6
Triesenberg	39.8	4	60.2	7
Vaduz	59.5	8	40.5	5
Source: Statistisches Jahrbuch 1999, p.356-367
