= Eduard Oehri =

Liechtenstein politician (1903–1994)

Member of the Landtag of Liechtenstein for Unterland
- In office 6 February 1949 – 15 February 1953

Personal details
- Born: 1 December 1903 Schellenberg, Liechtenstein
- Died: 16 January 1994 (aged 90) Schellenberg, Liechtenstein
- Party: Progressive Citizens' Party
- Spouse: Rosa Kaiser (m. 1934; died 1962)
- Relations: Hugo Oehri (brother); Karl Kaiser (father-in-law)
- Children: 9

Eduard Oehri (1 December 1903 – 16 January 1994) was a politician from Liechtenstein who served in the Landtag of Liechtenstein from 1949 to 1953.

He worked as a farmer, bricklayer and police officer in Schellenberg. His brother Hugo Oehri served as the mayor of Schellenberg, and his father-in-law was member of the Landtag of Liechtenstein, Karl Kaiser.

== Bibliography ==
- Vogt, Paul (1987). 125 Jahre Landtag (in German). Vaduz: Landtag of the Principality of Liechtenstein.
