= List of mayors of Triesen =

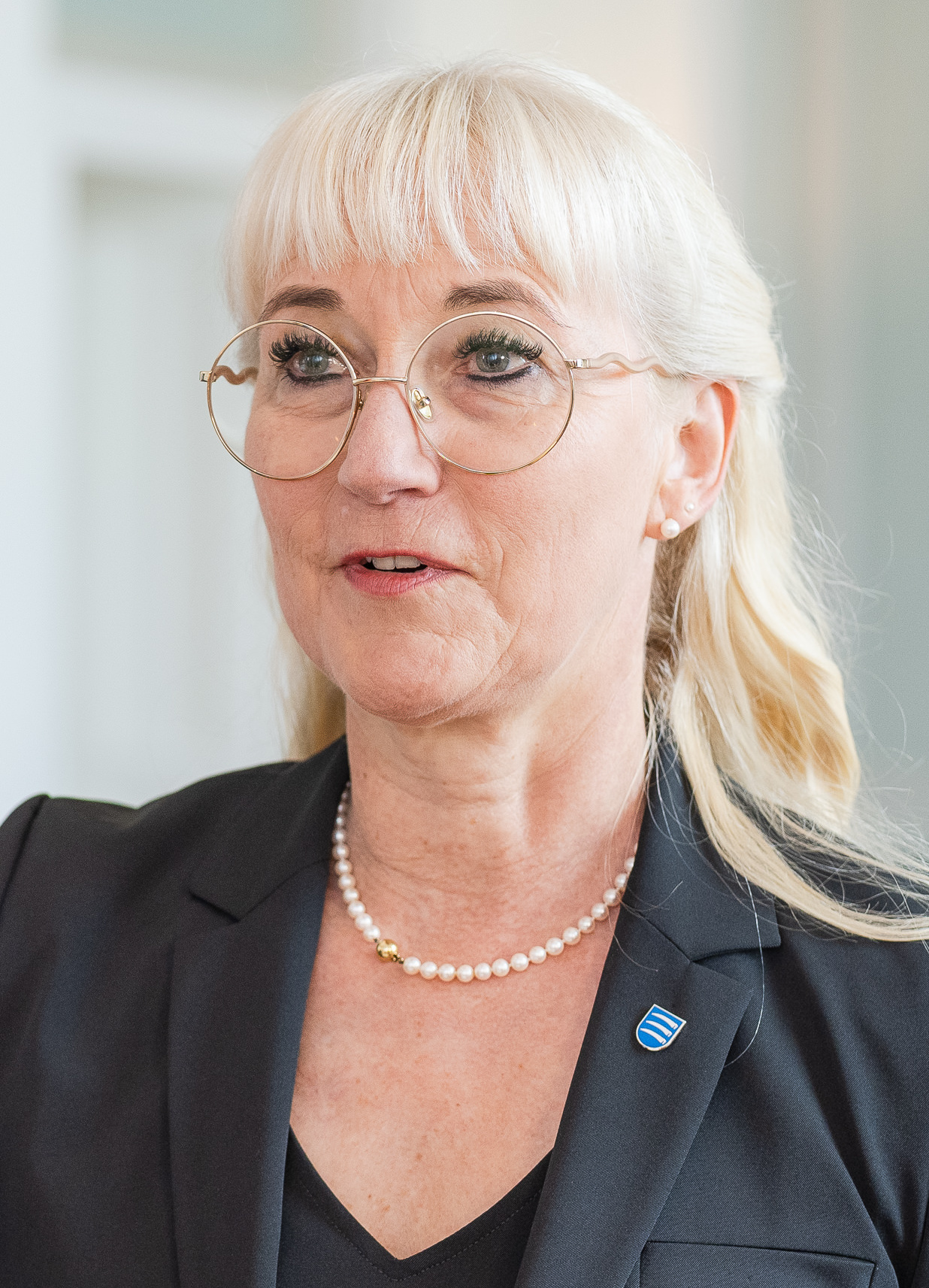
Daniela Erne-Beck, incumbent mayor of Triesen

The mayor of Triesen is the head of the Triesen municipal government. The role has existed since the introduction of the Liechtenstein municipal law of 1864.

The incumbent mayor is Daniela Erne-Beck, since 2019.

== List of mayors (1864–present) ==
List of mayorsList of mayors (1864–present)
No. (Note: People are numbered according to periods served by the same person. For example, Franz Xaver Bargetze served as mayor in four non-consecutive terms, but is counted only once.)	Name	Term	Party	Ref(s)
1	Josef Bargetze	1864–1867	—	
2	Josef Walser	1867–1870	—	
3	Maximilian Kindle	1870–1873	—	
4	Anton Bargetze	1873	—	
5	Johann Bargetze	1873–1877	—	
6	Wendelin Erni	1877–1879	—	
7	Wolfgang Bargetze	1879–1882	—	
8	Franz Xaver Bargetze	1882–1885	—	
(6)	Wendelin Erni	1885–1888	—	
(8)	Franz Xaver Bargetze	1888–1891	—	
(6)	Wendelin Erni	1891–1894	—	
(8)	Franz Xaver Bargetze	1894–1897	—	
9	Andreas Banzer	1897–1900	—	
(8)	Franz Xaver Bargetze	1900–1906	—	
10	Luzius Gassner	1906–1918	—	
11	Oskar Bargetze	1918–1921	—	
12	Emil Bargetze	1921–1924	VP	
13	Emil Risch	1924–1927	FBP	
(12)	Emil Bargetze	1927–1929	VP	
14	Adolf Frommelt	1929–1936	FBP	
15	Ferdinand Heidegger	1936–1960	VU	
16	Gabriel Negele	1960–1963	FBP	
17	Alois Beck	1963–1969	VU	
18	Rudolf Kindle	1969–1987	VU	
19	Xaver Hoch	1987–2007	FBP	
20	Günter Mahl	2007–2019	FBP	
21	Daniela Erne	2019–	VU	

== See also ==
- Triesen
