= 1972 Liechtenstein local elections =

- 23 January 1972
- Mayoral results by municipality

Local elections were held in Liechtenstein on 23 January 1972 to elect the municipal councils and the mayors of the eleven municipalities.

== Electoral system ==
Under the municipal law of 1959, the mayors of the respective municipalities were elected by a majority vote. The municipal councillors and their deputies were elected by open list proportional representation. Voters vote for a party list and then may strike through candidates they do not wish to cast a preferential vote for and may add names of candidates from other lists. Only men aged 20 or over were eligible to vote.

== Results ==
=== Summary ===
Party	Mayors
Progressive Citizens' Party	7
Patriotic Union	4
Total	11
Source: Liechtensteiner Volksblatt

=== Mayoral elections ===
Municipality	Party	Elected mayor
Balzers	Progressive Citizens' Party	Emanuel Vogt
Eschen	Patriotic Union	Egon Marxer
Gamprin	Patriotic Union	Alois Oehri
Mauren	Progressive Citizens' Party	Werner Matt
Planken	Progressive Citizens' Party	Anton Nägele
Ruggell	Progressive Citizens' Party	Hugo Oehri
Schaan	Progressive Citizens' Party	Walter Beck
Schellenberg	Patriotic Union	Hermann Hassler
Triesen	Patriotic Union	Rudolf Kindle
Triesenberg	Patriotic Union	Alfons Schädler
Vaduz	Progressive Citizens' Party	Hilmar Ospelt
Source: Liechtensteiner Volksblatt

=== Municipal council elections ===
Constituency	Seats	Councillors	Deputies
Balzers	8	Wilhelm Bürzle; Georg Gstöhl; Anton Vogt; Theobald Büchel; Klemens Brunhart; Felix Vogt; Josef Kaufmann; Lorenz Kaufmann	Adolf Vogt; Andreas Büchel; Anton Gstöhl; David Büchel; Hermann Vogt; Anton Eberle; Karl Wolfinger; Alfons Wanger
Eschen	8	Erich Hoop; Adolf Kranz; Adolf Hasler; Alois Allgäuer; Raimund Marxer; Anton Batliner; Helmut Batliner; Albert Kranz	Siegfried Gerner; Guntram Ott; Eugen Marxer; Hugo Gstöhl; August Kranz; Franz Thöny; Anton Marxer; Rochus Marxer
Gamprin	8	Vinzenz Müssner; Alois Kind; Felix Büchel; Alois Büchel; Guido Näscher; Alfons Hasler; Edwin Hasler; Alois Näscher	Jakob Näscher; Elwin Hasler; Felix Hasler; Alfons Kind; Norbert Hasler; Josef Büchel
Mauren	8	Rupert Walser; Anton Meier; Hubert Senti; Roland Matt; Adolf Marxer; David Mündle; Franz Oehri; Engelbert Marxer	Alois Ritter; Gebhard Oehri; Paul Matt; Franz Meier; Edi Marxer; Franz Marok; René Ritter; Lothar Jäger
Planken	4	August Gantner; Eugen Jehle; Sigmund Gantner; Karl Jehle	Engelbert Wachter; Gustav Jehle; Reinold Nägele; Hans Gantner
Ruggell	6	Wilfried Büchel; Franz Büchel; Elmar Büchel; Alwin Oehri; Roland Heeb; Alois Heeb	Walter Büchel; Walter Oehri; Bartold Oehri; Adolf Eberle; Paul Kind; Ludwig Büchel
Schaan	8	Hugo Walser; Noldi Frick; Norbert Brunhart; Hansruedi Sele; Augustin Hilty; Rudolf Wanger; Peter Kaufmann; Eugen Kranz	Kurt Frick; Reinold Wanger; Theo Risch; Walter Wanger; Bruno Kaiser; Karl Riddesser; Karl Konrad; Andreas Hasler
Schellenberg	6	Ewald Goop; Guido Risch; Alwin Büchel; Edgar Elkuch; Alban Hasler; Eugen Hasler	Siegfried Biedermann; Andreas Kaiser; Franz Beck; Anton Oehri; Christoph Biedermann; Urban Büchel
Triesen	8	Werner Heider; Alois Beck; Gabriele Nägele; Hermann Kindle; Arnold Schurte; Fidel Tschol; Heinrich Feger; Ferdinand Sprenger	Ronald Kindle; Max Kindle; Eugen Nutt; Heinrich Kindle; Marzellin Kindle; Elmar Negele; Paul Kindle; Alwin Bargetze
Triesenberg	8	Eugen Schädler; Hans Gassner; Johann Beck; Johann Lampert; Hubert Sele; Gottliebin Lampert; Ewald Eberle; Rudolf Schädler	Arnold Beck; Egon Beck; Walter Bühler; Engelbert Schädler; Louis Gassner; Josef Beck; Hans Egon Hilbe; Franz Bühler
Vaduz	8	Peter Beck; Josef Marxer; Toni Meier; Peter Ritter; Emil Real; Arnold Ospelt; Arthur Konrad; Josef Ospelt	Arthur Vogt; Oskar Wachter; Hans Wolf; Anton Seger; Peter Kieber; Friedrich Biedermann; Werner Verling; Günther Verling
Source: Liechtensteiner Volksblatt
