= Adolf Frommelt =

Liechtenstein farmer and politician (1891–1964)

Member of the Landtag of Liechtenstein for Oberland
- In office 6 March 1932 – 3 February 1936

Mayor of Triesen
- In office 1929–1936
- Preceded by: Emil Bargetze
- Succeeded by: Ferdinand Heidegger

Personal details
- Born: 6 June 1891 Triesen, Liechtenstein
- Died: 6 October 1964 (aged 73) Triesen, Liechtenstein
- Party: Progressive Citizens' Party (by 1930); Christian-Social People's Party
- Spouse: Maria Aloisia Banzer (m. 1919; died 1950)
- Children: 4

Adolf Frommelt (6 June 1891 – 6 October 1964) was a farmer and politician from Liechtenstein who served in the Landtag of Liechtenstein from 1932 to 1936. He also served as mayor of Triesen from 1929 to 1936.

== Life ==
Frommelt was born on 6 June 1891 in Triesen as the son of Alois Frommelt and Kreszenz (née Banzer) as one of five children. He worked as a baker and farmer, establishing a bakery and grocery store in Triesen.

He was the deputy mayor of Triesen from 1927 to 1929 as a member of the Christian Social People's Party (VP). Following the removal of Emil Bargetze in 1929, Frommelt was appointed by the government as mayor, where he served until 1936. By 1930, he had switched from the VP to the Progressive Citizens' Party (FBP).

Frommelt initially unsuccessfully ran for a seat in the Landtag of Liechtenstein in the 1928 elections as a member of the VP, tying votes with Franz Amann, thus the candidate for the election's second round was decided by lottery, which resulted in Amann's favour. He was then elected a member of the Landtag in 1932 as a member of the FBP, where he served until he lost re-election to Ferdinand Heidegger of the Patriotic Union (VU) in the 1936 elections. In 1939 he was elected as a deputy member of the Landtag as a part of the unified list between the FBP and VU for the formation of a coalition government.

Frommelt married Maria Aloisia Banzer (25 November 1893 – 12 February 1950) on 28 April 1919 and they had four children together. He died due to heart illness on 6 October 1964, aged 73.

== Bibliography ==
- Vogt, Paul (1987). 125 Jahre Landtag (in German). Vaduz: Landtag of the Principality of Liechtenstein.
