= Ferdinand Heidegger =

Liechtenstein politician (1899–1978)

Member of the Landtag of Liechtenstein for Triesen
- In office 3 February 1936 – 4 April 1939

Mayor of Triesen
- In office 1936–1960
- Preceded by: Adolf Frommelt
- Succeeded by: Gabriel Negele

Personal details
- Born: 4 August 1899 Triesen, Liechtenstein
- Died: 19 August 1978 (aged 79) Grabs, Switzerland
- Party: Patriotic Union (from 1936); Christian-Social People's Party (before 1936)
- Spouse: Maria Hoch (m. 1931)
- Relations: Marzell Heidegger (brother)
- Children: 4

Ferdinand Heidegger (4 August 1899 – 19 August 1978) was a farmer and politician from Liechtenstein who served in the Landtag of Liechtenstein from 1936 to 1939. A member of the Patriotic Union (VU), he also served as the mayor of Triesen from 1936 to 1960.

== Life ==
Heidegger was born on 4 August 1899 in Triesen as the son of deputy mayor Jakob Heidegger and Berta (née Erne) as one of four children. From 1918, he worked as a factory worker at Jenny, Spoerry & Cie; he ran a farm until 1970, during which time he leased the agricultural operation of Jenny, Spoerry & Cie from 1934 to 1954.

He unsuccessfully ran for a seat in the Landtag of Liechtenstein in 1932 as a member of the Christian-Social People's Party before being elected in the 1936 elections as a member of the Patriotic Union (VU), defeating Adolf Frommelt of the Progressive Citizens' Party (FBP), where he would serve until 1939. During this time, he advocated for the naturalization of Jews in Liechtenstein via taxation. Also in 1936, he was elected as the mayor of Triesen, a position he served until 1960. During his time as mayor, the parish church was renovated in 1939 and 1942, and the completion of a new primary school, starting in 1959.

From 1937 to 1947 and again from 1952 to 1959 he was a member of the board of directors at Liechtensteinische Kraftwerke. In 1922, he co-founded the Triesen Men's Choir, was its president from 1929 to 1931, and then an honorary member from 1947. He was also president of the Liechtenstein Music Association from 1952 to 1963 and an honorary member of the Princely Liechtenstein Singers' Association.

Heidegger married Maria Hoch (21 September 1904 – 22 December 1991) on 16 February 1931 and they had four children together. His brother Marzell served as a government councillor from 1949 to 1951. Heidegger died on 19 August 1978, aged 79.

== Bibliography ==
- Vogt, Paul (1987). 125 Jahre Landtag (in German). Vaduz: Landtag of the Principality of Liechtenstein.
