= Adolf Goop =

Mayor of Schellenberg from 1927 to 1933

Mayor of Schellenberg
- In office 1927–1933
- Preceded by: Karl Kaiser
- Succeeded by: Philipp Elkuch

Personal details
- Born: 21 March 1870 Schellenberg, Liechtenstein
- Died: 18 September 1964 (aged 94) Schellenberg, Liechtenstein
- Party: Christian-Social People's Party
- Spouse: Regina Olga Elkuch (m. 1894; died 1961)
- Relations: Ludwig Elkuch (father-in-law)
- Children: 3

Adolf Goop (21 March 1870 – 18 September 1964) was a carpenter and politician who served as the Mayor of Schellenberg from 1927 to 1933.

== Life ==
Goop was born on 21 March 1870 in Schellenberg as son of municipal councillor Andreas Goop and Karolina (née Öhri) as one of seven children. He initially worked as a factory boy and then a house servant before conducting a carpentry apprenticeship in Eschen. He worked as a farmer in Schellenberg and also as a carpenter in Feldkirch.

He was a member of the Schellenberg municipal council from 1924 to 1927 as a member of the Christian-Social People's Party (VP), and then mayor of the municipality from 1927 to 1933. During his time as mayor, he oversaw the construction of a new water supply system. Goop unsuccessfully ran for a seat in the Landtag of Liechtenstein in the January/April 1926, 1928, and 1932 elections as a member of the VP.

Goop married Regina Olga Elkuch (28 November 1894 – 28 August 1961), the daughter of mayor Ludwig Elkuch, on 8 April 1918 and they had they children together. He died on 18 September 1964, aged 94; he was the oldest person in Liechtenstein at the time of his death.

== Bibliography ==
- Vogt, Paul (1987). 125 Jahre Landtag (in German). Vaduz: Landtag of the Principality of Liechtenstein.
