= Non-Party List =

Defunct political party in Liechtenstein

Non-Party List Überparteiliche Liste Liechtenstein
- Abbreviation: ULL
- Founded: 1987
- Dissolved: 1999

The Non-Party List Liechtenstein (German: Überparteiliche Liste Liechtenstein, ÜLL) was a political party in Liechtenstein that existed from 1987 to 1999.

== History ==
The party was founded in 1987 by the people responsible to the opposition to the construction of an art museum in Vaduz in 1983, which directly led to the Kunsthaus case. It sought to challenge the political dominance of both the Progressive Citizens' Party and the Patriotic Union, but also wanted to take a less radical approach to the recently formed Free List.

The party first contested the 1987 local elections and won two seats in the Vaduz municipal council. In the 1991 local elections, it managed to win a seat in Vaduz and in Triesenberg, then just one seat in Triesenberg in the 1995 local elections. It contested the 1989 Liechtenstein general election and received 3.2% of the vote, but failed to reach the electoral threshold of 8% to win seats in the Landtag. The party dissolved in 1999.

== Electoral results ==
Election	Votes	%	Seats	+/–	Position	Government
1989	5,061	3.2	0 / 25	–	—N/a	—N/a
