= 1980 Vaduz mayoral by-election =

1980 Vaduz by-election
- 15 June 1980
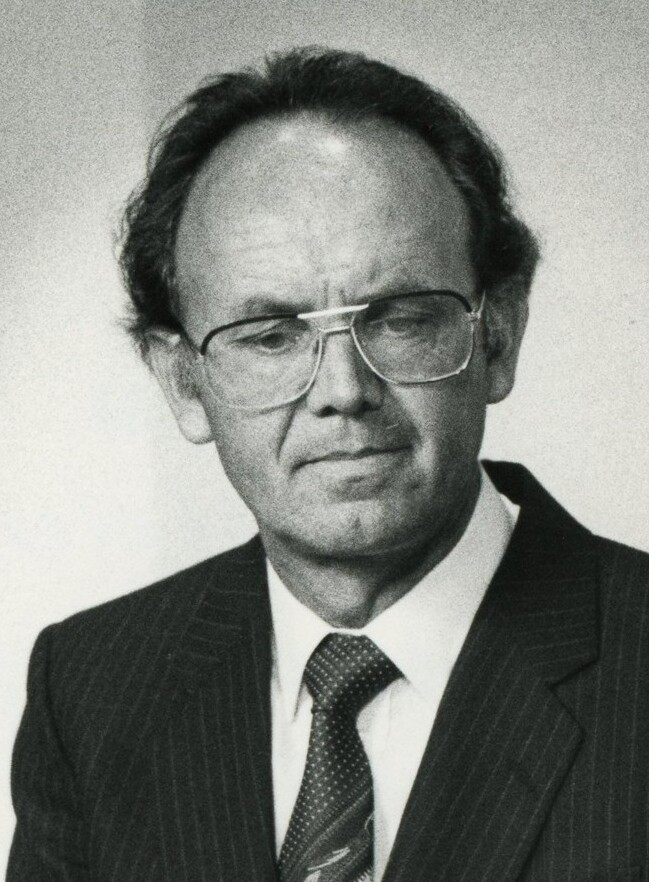
	First party	Second party
Leader	Arthur Konrad	Ernst Walser
Party	FBP	Patriotic Union
Popular vote	800	511
Percentage	61%	39%
Mayor before election
Hilmar Ospelt
FBP
Elected mayor
Arthur Konrad
FBP

A by-election was held in Vaduz on 15 June 1980 to elect the mayor of Vaduz following the resignation of incumbent mayor Hilmar Ospelt. The result was a win for Arthur Konrad of the Progressive Citizens' Party, defeating Ernst Walser of the Patriotic Union.

== Results ==
Candidate	Party	Votes	%
Arthur Konrad	Progressive Citizens' Party	800	61.02
Ernst Walser	Patriotic Union	511	38.98
Total		1,311	100.00
Source: Liechtensteiner Volksblatt

== See also ==
- 2024 Vaduz mayoral by-election
