= Karl Kaiser =

Liechtenstein politician (1866–1935)

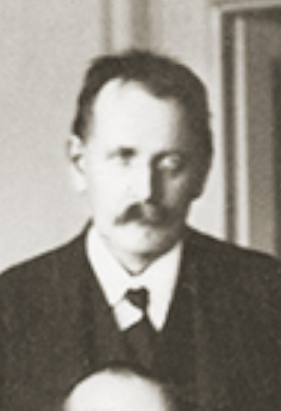
- Kaiser in 1921

Member of the Landtag of Liechtenstein for Unterland
- In office 18 March 1918 – 6 March 1932

Mayor of Schellenberg
- In office 1915–1927
- Preceded by: Andreas Hassler
- Succeeded by: Adolf Goop

Personal details
- Born: 3 November 1866 Schellenberg, Liechtenstein
- Died: 21 February 1935 (aged 68) Schellenberg, Liechtenstein
- Party: Progressive Citizens' Party
- Spouse(s): Rosa Goop (m. 1895; died 1907) Angelina Hasler (m. 1909; died 1922)
- Relations: Eduard Oehri (son-in-law)
- Children: 12
- Parent(s): Josef Kaiser; Elisabeth Elkuch

Karl Kaiser (3 November 1866 – 21 February 1935) was a politician from Liechtenstein who served in the Landtag of Liechtenstein from 1918 to 1932. He also served as mayor of Schellenberg from 1915 to 1927.

== Life ==
Kaiser was born on 3 November 1866 as the son of the mayor Josef Kaiser and Elisabeth Elkuch. He worked as a farmer. He was the commander Schellenberg fire brigade 1892 to 1906. From 1903 to 1915 he was a member of the Schellenberg municipal council and then deputy mayor of the municipality from 1909 to 1915, when he succeeded Andreas Hassler as mayor upon his death in March 1915. He remained mayor until 1927.

Kaiser was a founding member of the Progressive Citizens' Party in 1918. He was a member of the Landtag of Liechtenstein from 1918 to 1932, where he was also a member of the finance commission and state committee. In addition, he was a deputy judge at the Liechtenstein supreme court from 1922 to 1927.

Kaiser married Rosa Goop (27 October 1872 – 6 July 1907) on 7 January 1895 and they had six children together. He then went on to marry Angelina Hasler (3 September 1878 – 2 June 1922) on 24 May 1909 and they had another six children together. His daughter married Eduard Oehri, who also served in the Landtag.

He died on 21 February 1935 in Schellenberg, aged 68.

== Bibliography ==
- Vogt, Paul (1987). 125 Jahre Landtag (in German). Vaduz: Landtag of the Principality of Liechtenstein.
