= Daniela Erne-Beck =

Mayor of Triesen since 2019

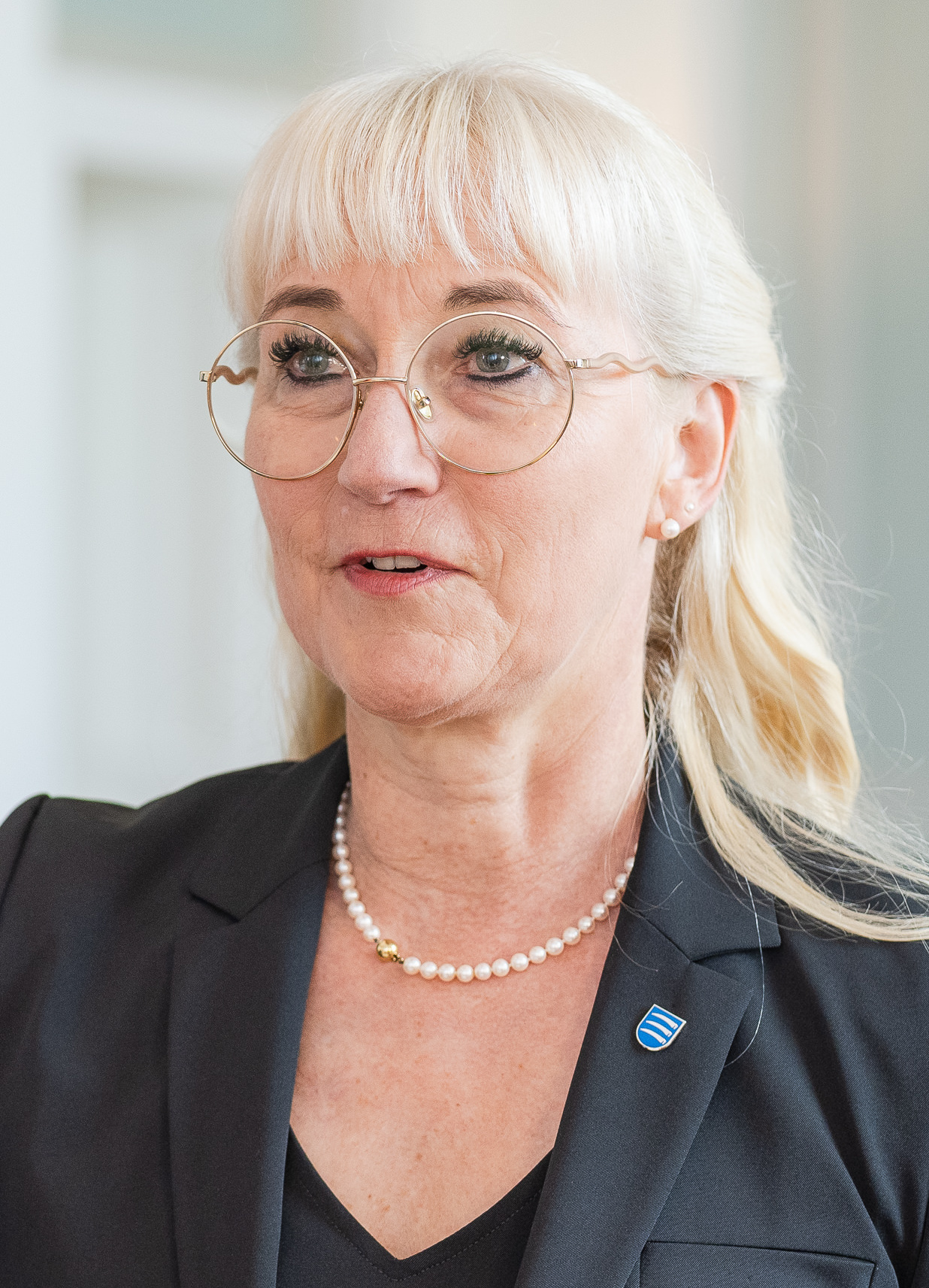
- Kaiser-Eberle in 2023

Mayor of Triesen
- Incumbent
- Assumed office 1 May 2019
- Deputy: Egbert Sprenger (2019–2023); Kurt Salzgeber (2023–2025); Dominik Banzer (2025–)
- Preceded by: Günter Mahl

Personal details
- Born: Daniela Erne; 29 June 1966 (age 59) Neuchâtel, Switzerland
- Party: Patriotic Union
- Spouse(s): Michael Wellenzohn (m. 1986; div. 2021) Daniel Beck (m. 2024)
- Children: 3

Daniela Erne-Beck (née Erne, previously Wellenzohn-Erne; born 29 June 1966) is a teacher and politician from Liechtenstein who has served as the mayor of Triesen since 2019.

== Life ==
Erne was born on 29 June 1966 in Neuchâtel as the daughter of Bruno Erne and nurse Arlette (née Vioget) as one of two children. She attended primary school in Triesen and then secondary school in Vaduz and the St. Elisabeth Monastery in Schaan. She trained as a kindergarten teacher Cham and is a certified kindergarten teacher and primary school physical education teacher. From 2006 to 2010 she trained as a transactional analyst.

From 1986 to 1987 Erne was the head of the day-care in Triesen before becoming a kindergarten teacher in Vaduz from 1987 to 1993. She was a substitute kindergarten teacher from 1993 to 2017 and was also a swimming instructor from 2001 to 2017.

She was a judge at the Liechtenstein criminal court from 2007 to 2015. Since 2019, Erne has been the mayor of Triesen as a member of the Patriotic Union (VU), narrowly defeating Remy Kindle of the Progressive Citizens' Party. She is the first female mayor of the municipality. In addition, she also served as the vice president of the Patriotic Union from 2015 to 2023.

As of September 2025, Erne-Beck has been involved in a political scandal since March instigated by the members of the Triesen municipal council belonging to the VU disbanded its working group in response to her conduct as mayor. In response, she defended herself and accused the members of nepotism.

She married Michael Wellenzohn, a manager, on 25 September 1991 and they had three children together, but they divorced in 2021. She then went on to marry Daniel Beck on 5 July 2024.
