= Lawena =

- Alp
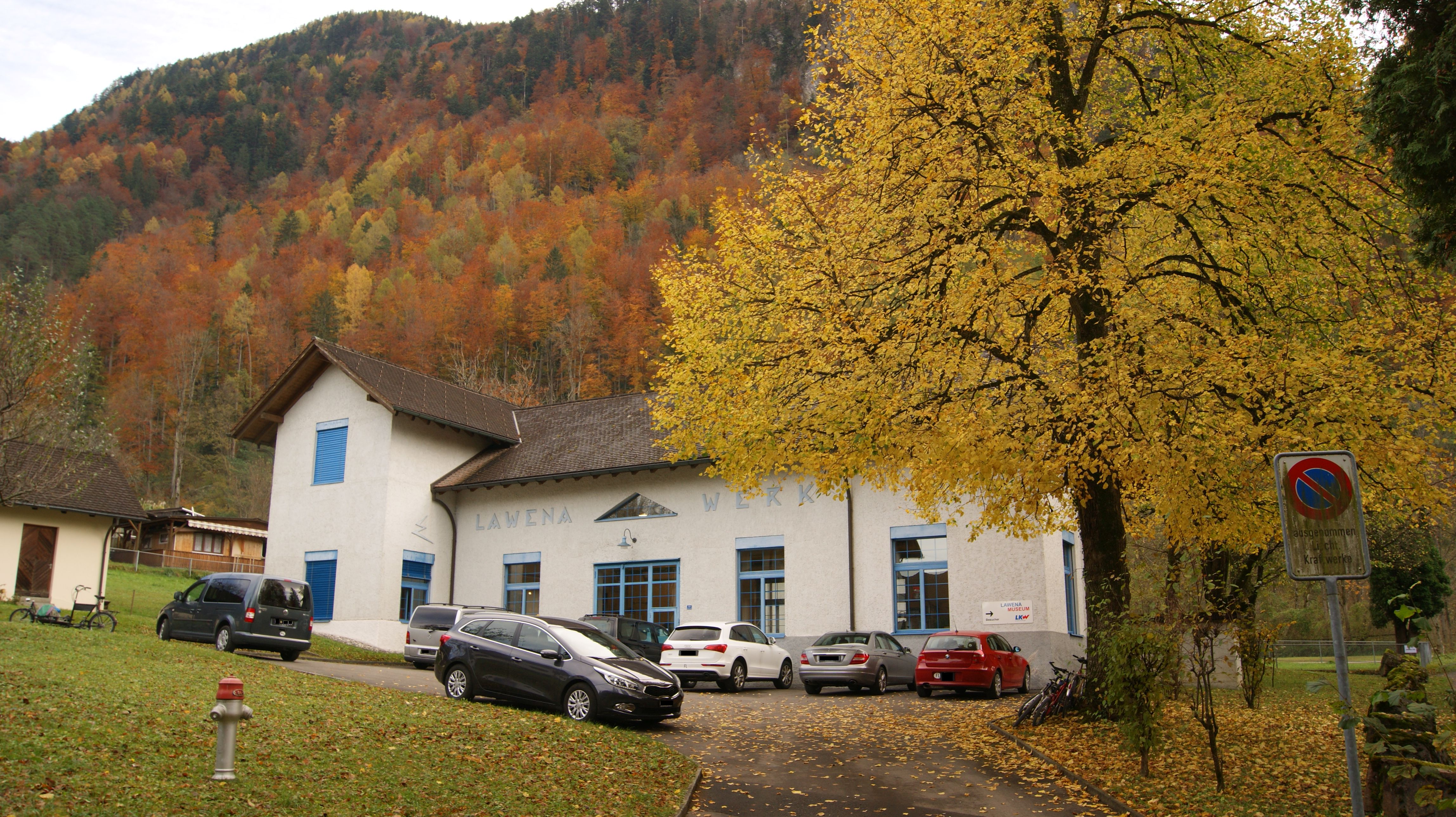
- Lawena Power Plant in 2014

- Location within Liechtenstein
- Country: Liechtenstein
- Electoral district: Oberland
- Municipality: Triesen

Lawena is an Alp (alpine pasture) in southern Liechtenstein, located in the municipality of Triesen. The Lawena Power Plant (Kraftwerk Lawena) is the oldest hydropower station in Liechtenstein. There is also an electricity museum there, the Lawena Museum. The Alp Lawena is located in a basin-like high valley at around 1,500 metres (4,900 ft) above sea level. The alp is framed by the mighty Falknis, the Mittagspitz and the Rappenstein and is a good starting point for hikes. The alp can be reached from Triesen in about 2–3 hours.

== Lawena power plant ==
The power plant, formerly named LawenaWerke, is the oldest hydropower station in Liechtenstein. It has a catchment area of 4.7 square kilometres (1.8 sq mi). Construction of the plant was finished in 1927, and it had at that point two generators, each with an output of 360 kW. In 1946 these generators were replaced by a single 900 kW generator, and in 1987 a supplemental 2,900 kW generator was added, during power plant renovations. The total annual production of 14,000 MWh supplies more than 3000 households. The power plant incorporates the museum.

== Lawena museum ==
The museum opened in 2011, and covers the history of electricity. It is run by volunteers from the Lawena Pro association of retired truck drivers, which was also established in 2011. The museum houses a permanent collection of around five hundred items, covering the electrification of Liechtenstein, and how this affected industry. It also covers domestic appliances and consumer electronics. On the third floor is an exhibition on electrical measuring instruments.
