= Rappenstein =

Mountain in Liechtenstein

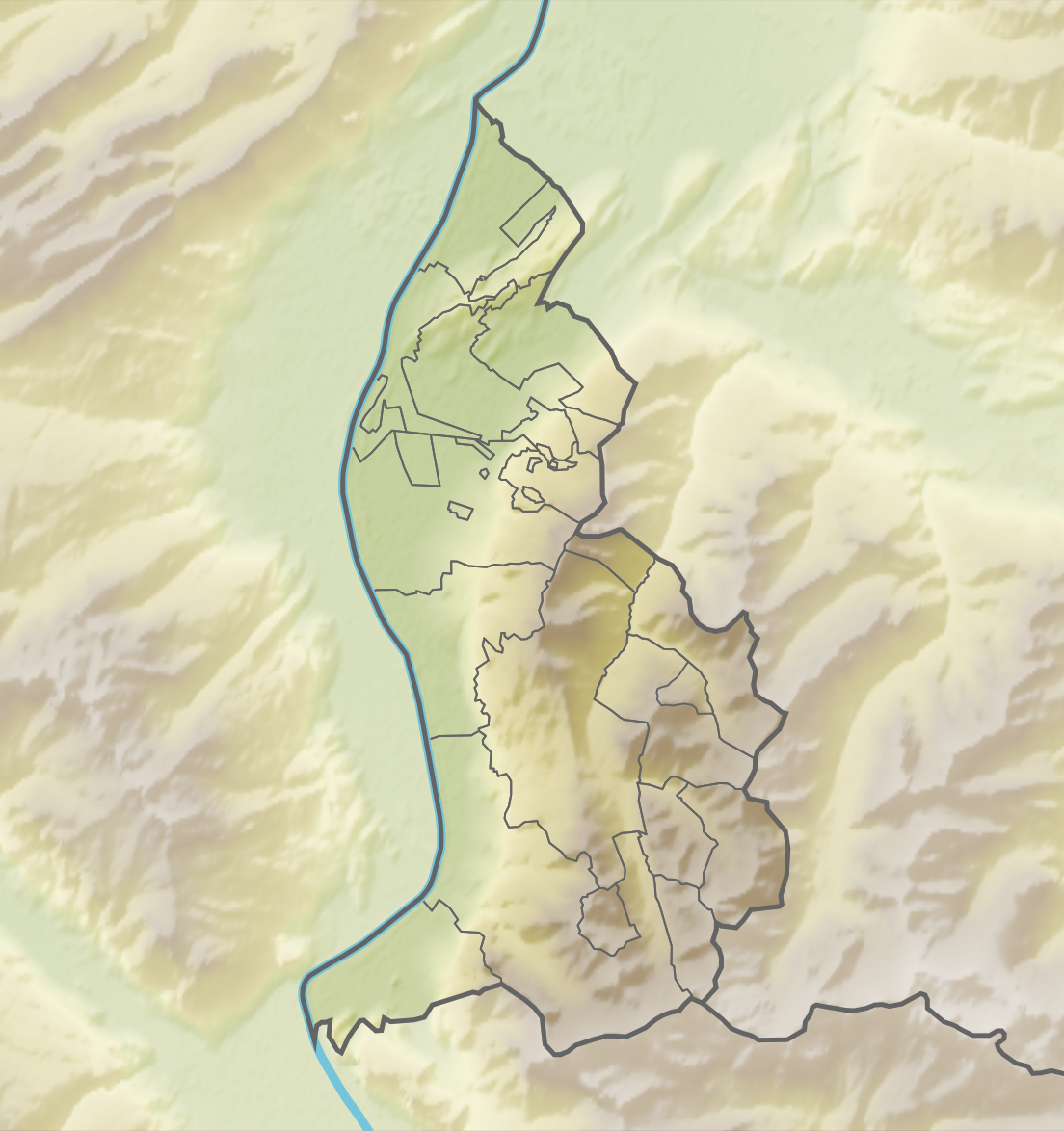
- Location within Liechtenstein

Highest point
- Elevation: 2,222 m (7,290 ft)
- Coordinates: 47°04′35″N 9°34′00″E

Geography
- Location: Location in Liechtenstein
- Parent range: Rätikon, Alps

Rappenstein is a mountain in Liechtenstein in the Rätikon range of the Eastern Alps with a height of 2,222 metres (7,290 ft).
