= Dietmar Lampert =

Liechtenstein politician (born 1966)

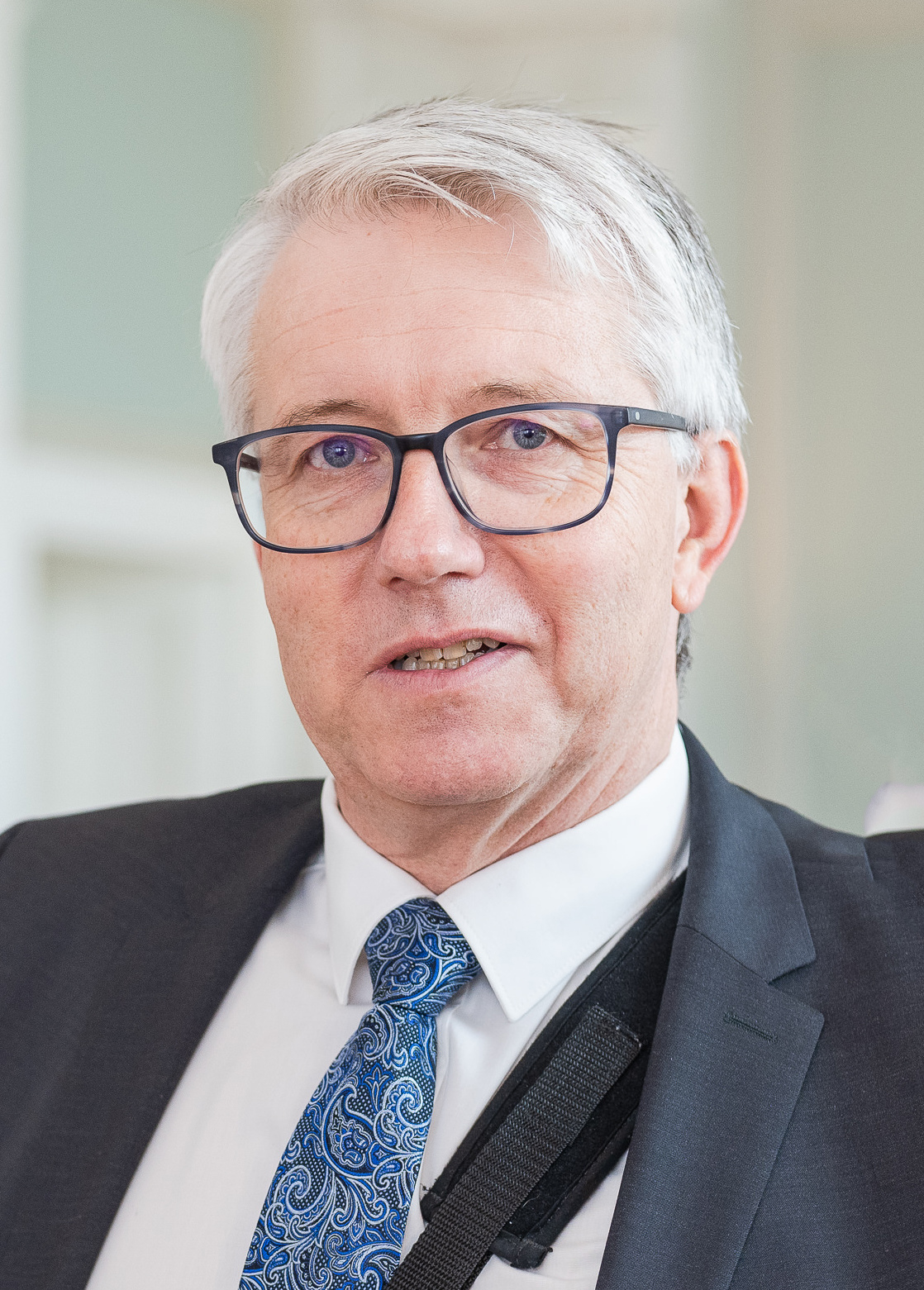
- Lampert in 2023

Member of the Landtag of Liechtenstein for Unterland
- In office 7 February 2021 – 9 February 2025

Mayor of Schellenberg
- Incumbent
- Assumed office 1 May 2023
- Deputy: Jonas Grubenmann
- Preceded by: Norman Wohlwend

Personal details
- Born: 13 October 1966 (age 59) Vorarlberg, Austria
- Party: Patriotic Union
- Spouse: Annemarie Raffer (m. 1998)
- Children: 3

Dietmar Lampert (born 13 October 1966) is a politician from Liechtenstein who served in the Landtag of Liechtenstein from 2021 to 2025. He has also served as mayor of Schellenberg since 2023.

== Life ==
Lampert was born 13 October 1966 in Schellenberg as the son of Max Lampert and Katharina (née Bischof) as one of four children. He attended primary school in Schellenberg, and then secondary school in Eschen. From 1982 to 1986 he conducted an apprenticeship as an agricultural machinery mechanic. In 2002 he graduated as an engineer. From 2007 to 2023 he worked at ThyssenKrupp as the department head of project management and later as a senior project manager.

From 1999 to 2015 Lampert was a member of the Schellenberg municipal council as a member of the Patriotic Union. From 2007 to 2015 he was the school board president and from 2005 to 2023 he was the chairman of the Patriotic Union group in Schellenberg. From 2017 to 2021 he was a deputy government councillor under Dominique Hasler.

From 2021 to 2025 he was a member of the Landtag of Liechtenstein and the chairman of the Liechtenstein delegation to the European Economic Area and Schengen Area. He did not seek re-election in the 2025 elections.

Since 2023 Lampert has been the mayor of Schellenberg. He lost the first round to Robert Hassler of the Progressive Citizens' Party, but as no candidate achieved a majority of votes a second round was held, and Lampert won a plurality with a difference of only five votes.

Lampert married Annemarie Raffer on 4 December 1998 and they have three children together.
