= Hermann Hassler =

Liechtenstein politician and cabaret performer (1941–2013)

Member of the Landtag of Liechtenstein for Unterland
- In office 3 February 1978 – 7 February 1993

Mayor of Schellenberg
- In office 1972–1979
- Preceded by: Hugo Oehri
- Succeeded by: Edgar Elkuch

Personal details
- Born: 30 March 1941 Schellenberg, Liechtenstein
- Died: 19 December 2013 (aged 72) Schellenberg, Liechtenstein
- Party: Patriotic Union
- Spouse: Christina Lampert (m. 1968)
- Children: 2
- Parent(s): Alois Hassler; Hermine Meier

Hermann Hassler (30 March 1941 – 19 December 2013) was a cabaret performer and politician from Liechtenstein who served in the Landtag of Liechtenstein from 1978 to 1993. He was also the mayor of Schellenberg from 1972 to 1979.

== Life ==
Hassler was born on 30 March 1941 in Schellenberg as the son of Landtag member Alois Hassler and Hermina (née Meier) as one of five children. He attended secondary school in Eschen before conducting an apprenticeship as a mechanical draftsman at Hilti in Schaan from 1957 to 1961. He then conducted an apprenticeship and worked as a graphic designer in Vaduz from 1962 to 1979.

He was a member of the Schellenberg municipal council from 1969 to 1972 as a member of the Patriotic Union. He was the mayor of Schellenberg from 1972 to 1979. He was a member of the Landtag of Liechtenstein from 1978 to 1993. During this time, he was a member of the finance, state and foreign affairs committees. He was also the Patriotic Union's spokesman in the Landtag from 1986 to 1989. He was a board member of the newspaper Liechtensteiner Vaterland and its president of the press association from 1984 to 1986.

Hassler was a cabaret performer and was a member of the board of directors at the TAK Theater Liechtenstein in Schaan. He was the chairman of the office for stamp design and director of the Liechtenstein postal museum from 1979 to 2005. He published articles on philately in Liechtenstein.

In the run-up to the 2003 Liechtenstein constitutional referendum, Hassler alongside other former members of the Landtag, opposed the proposed changes by the prince.

Hassler married Christina Lampert on 7 September 1968 and they had two children together. He died from heart failure on 19 December 2013 in Schellenberg, aged 72 years old.

== Bibliography ==
- Vogt, Paul (1987). 125 Jahre Landtag (in German). Vaduz: Landtag of the Principality of Liechtenstein.
