= List of mayors of Schellenberg =

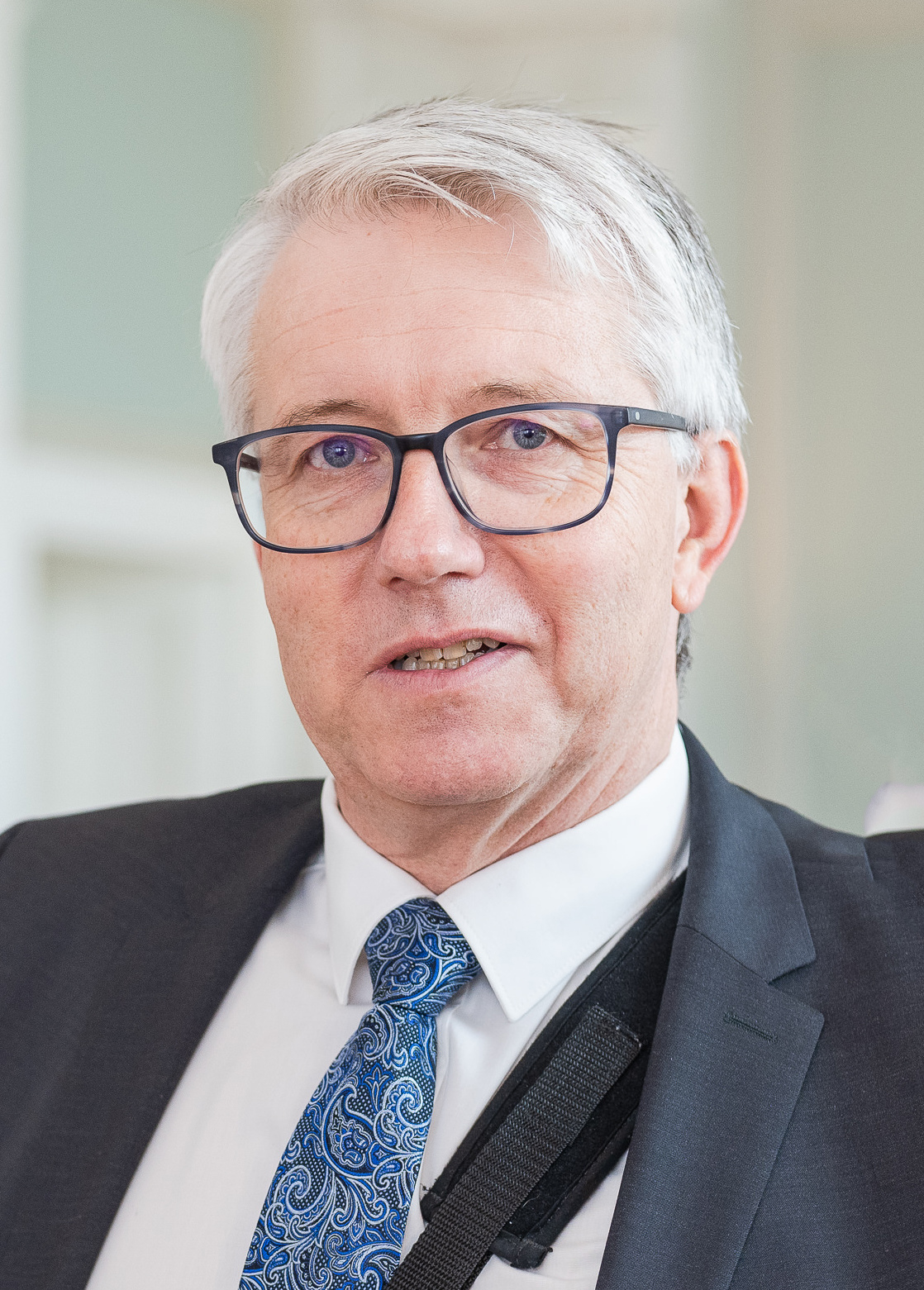
Dietmar Lampert, incumbent mayor of Schellenberg

The mayor of Schellenberg is the head of the Schellenberg municipal government. The role has existed since the introduction of the Liechtenstein municipal law of 1864.

The incumbent mayor is Dietmar Lampert, since 2023.

== List of mayors (1864–present) ==
List of mayorsList of mayors (1864–present)
No. (Note: People are numbered according to periods served by the same person. For example, Meinrad Marxer served as mayor in three non-consecutive terms, but is counted only once.)	Name	Term	Party	Ref(s).
1	Johann Hassler	1864–1867	—	
2	Josef Kaiser	1867–1870	—	
3	Meinrad Marxer	1870–1873	—	
(2)	Josef Kaiser	1873–1876	—	
(3)	Meinrad Marxer	1876–1885	—	
4	Elias Öhri	1885–1888	—	
(3)	Meinrad Marxer	1888–1891	—	
4	Matthäus Wohlwend	1891–1894	—	
5	Ludwig Elkuch	1894–1909	—	
6	Andreas Hassler	1909–1915	—	
7	Karl Kaiser	1915–1927	FBP	
8	Adolf Goop	1927–1933	CSVP	
9	Philipp Elkuch	1933–1945	FBP	
10	Urban Rederer	1945–1954	VU	
11	Georg Oehri	1954–1960	FBP	
12	Hugo Oehri	1960–1972	FBP	
13	Hermann Hassler	1972–1979	VU	
14	Edgar Elkuch	1979–1987	FBP	
15	Walter Kieber	1987–2003	VU	
16	Norman Wohlwend	2003–2023	FBP	
17	Dietmar Lampert	2023–	VU	

== See also ==
- Schellenberg
