= Walter Kieber (mayor) =

Mayor of Schellenberg from 1987 to 2003

Mayor of Schellenberg
- In office January 1987 – February 2003
- Deputy: Georg Hassler (1987–1991); German Wohlwend (1991–1995); Norman Wohlwend (1995–1999); Markus Hassler (1999–2003)
- Preceded by: Edgar Elkuch
- Succeeded by: Norman Wohlwend

Personal details
- Born: 8 December 1954 (age 71) Schellenberg, Liechtenstein
- Party: Patriotic Union
- Spouse: Margot Beck (m. 1977)
- Children: 2

Walter Kieber (born 8 December 1954) is a former banker and politician from Liechtenstein who served as the mayor of Schellenberg from 1987 to 2003.

== Life ==
Kieber was born on 8 December 1954 in Schellenberg as the son of Franz Kieber and Maria (née Büchel) as one of four children. He attended secondary business school in Vaduz and the conducted a business apprenticeship at the National Bank of Liechtenstein from 1971 to 1974. He worked at the bank from 1971 until his retirement in 2016. During this time, he was the deputy director from 1996 and the head of the bank's Eschen branch from 1998.

He was the chairman of the Schellenberg branch of the Patriotic Union from 1979 to 1989. He was a member of the Schellenberg municipal council from 1983 to 1987 as a member of the party and then mayor of the municipality from 1987 to 2003. During this time, he expanded Schellenberg's zoning areas for housing.

Kieber endorsed Dietmar Lampert for mayor of Schellenberg in the 2023 election. However, in 2024, Kieber was the leading opponent of a land transfer to build a retirement home in Schellenberg, which had been approved by Lampert and the municipal council, and he initiated a popular initiative against it. The land transfer was rejected in a local referendum in April by 64.6% of voters.

Kieber married Margot Beck on 24 September 1977 and they have two children together.

== Honours ==
- Liechtenstein: Commander's Cross of the Order of Merit of the Principality of Liechtenstein (2003)
