= Xaver Hoch =

Liechtenstein politician (born 1947)

Member of the Landtag of Liechtenstein for Oberland
- In office 7 February 1993 – 2 February 1997

Mayor of Triesen
- In office January 1987 – February 2007
- Deputy: Lorenz Kindle (1987–1991); Franz-Josef Beck (1991–1995); Uwe Bargetze (1995–2007)
- Preceded by: Rudolf Kindle
- Succeeded by: Günter Mahl

Personal details
- Born: 18 April 1947 (age 79) Triesen, Liechtenstein
- Party: Progressive Citizens' Party
- Spouse: Sylvia Gehrmann (m. 1984)
- Children: 1

Xaver Hoch (born 18 April 1947) is a politician from Liechtenstein who served in the Landtag of Liechtenstein from 1993 to 1997. He also served as the mayor of Triesen from 1987 to 2007.

He works as a self-employed civil engineer and architectural drafter. He was a member of the Triesen municipal council from 1975 to 1987. During his time as mayor, a new senior citizens home was opened in 1991 and the primary school was expanded.

== Honours ==
- Liechtenstein: Knight's Cross of the Order of Merit of the Principality of Liechtenstein (2007)
