= Lorenz Hasler =

Mayor of Gamprin from 1975 to 1991

Mayor of Gamprin
- In office 1975 – February 1991
- Deputy: Alois Kind; Maria Marxer
- Preceded by: Alois Oehri
- Succeeded by: Maria Marxer

Personal details
- Born: 2 March 1946 Bendern, Liechtenstein
- Died: 16 February 2016 (aged 69) Bendern, Liechtenstein
- Party: Progressive Citizens' Party
- Spouse: Brigitte Manahl (m. 1968)
- Relations: Otmar Hasler (brother)
- Children: 4

Lorenz Hasler (2 March 1946 – 16 February 2016) was a teacher and politician from Liechtenstein who served as the mayor of Gamprin from 1975 to 1991.

He attended teacher training college in Rickenbach before working as a primary school teacher in Balzers from 1967 to 1970, Ruggell from 1970 to 1991 and finally in Gamprin from 1991 to 2006. He did not seek re-election as mayor in 1991 and was succeeded by his deputy Maria Marxer. He was president of the Liechtenstein family support association from 2000 to 2004.

He married Brigitte Manahl on 1 August 1968 and they had four children together. His brother Otmar Hasler served as the Prime Minister of Liechtenstein from 2001 to 2009. He died unexpectedly on 16 February 2016, aged 69.

== Honours ==
- Liechtenstein: Commander's Cross of the Order of Merit of the Principality of Liechtenstein (1991)
