= Arthur Konrad =

Liechtensteiner politician (1934–2025)

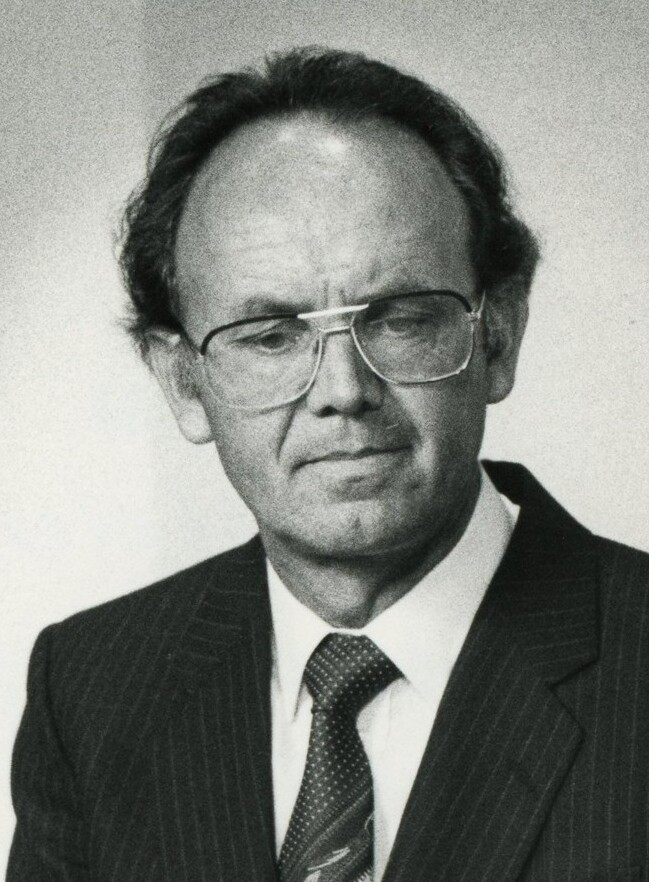
- Konrad in 1981

Mayor of Vaduz
- In office 16 June 1980 – February 1995
- Deputy: Werner Verling (1991–1995); Emma Brogle-Sele (1987–1991); Mortiz Gassner (1980–1987)
- Preceded by: Hilmar Ospelt
- Succeeded by: Karlheinz Ospelt

Personal details
- Born: 6 September 1934 Vaduz, Liechtenstein
- Died: 8 December 2025 (aged 91) Balzers, Liechtenstein
- Party: Progressive Citizens' Party
- Spouse: Ingrid Kuprian (m. 1961)
- Children: 2

Arthur Konrad (6 September 1934 – 8 December 2025) was a Liechtensteiner journalist and politician who served as the mayor of Vaduz from 1980 to 1995.

== Life and career ==
Konrad was born on 6 September 1934 in Vaduz as the son of farmer Rudolf Konrad and Regina (née Seger) as one of four children. He attended secondary school in the municipality before conducting an apprenticeship as a typesetter from 1951 to 1955 and then further education in Switzerland until 1961. He worked as a typesetter from 1961 to 1975.

He was the editor of the newspaper Liechtensteiner Volksblatt from 1974 to 1980. He was a member of the Vaduz municipal council from 1972 to 1979 as a member of the Progressive Citizens' Party, and also the deputy mayor of the municipality from 1975 to 1979. Konrad was elected mayor of the municipality in a by-election in 1980 following the resignation of Hilmar Ospelt, which he served until 1995.

During his time as mayor, the Ebenholz primary school was expanded, the town hall was renovated, and gas pipelines were partially introduced to the municipality. In May 1994, Konrad was charged by the public prosecutors office for allegedly misusing funds during a trip by the Vaduz municipal council to Vienna in 1992. He denied these allegations, and was ultimately acquitted in January 1995, with the princely court stating that there was "no evidence" that Konrad had violated his duties as mayor. Konrad did not seek re-election in the 1995 local elections and was succeeded by Karlheinz Ospelt in February.

He was the municipal mediator of Vaduz from 1998 to 2004 and chairman of the supervisory board of the Liechtenstein Gas Supply from 1997 to 2001.

Konrad married Ingrid Kuprian on 1 May 1965 and they had two children together. He died on 8 December 2025, at the age of 91.

== Honours ==
- Austria: Grand Decoration of Honour in Gold for Services to the Republic of Austria (1993)
- Liechtenstein: Knight's Cross of the Order of Merit of the Principality of Liechtenstein (1997)
