= Maria Marxer =

Mayor of Gamprin from 1991 to 1995

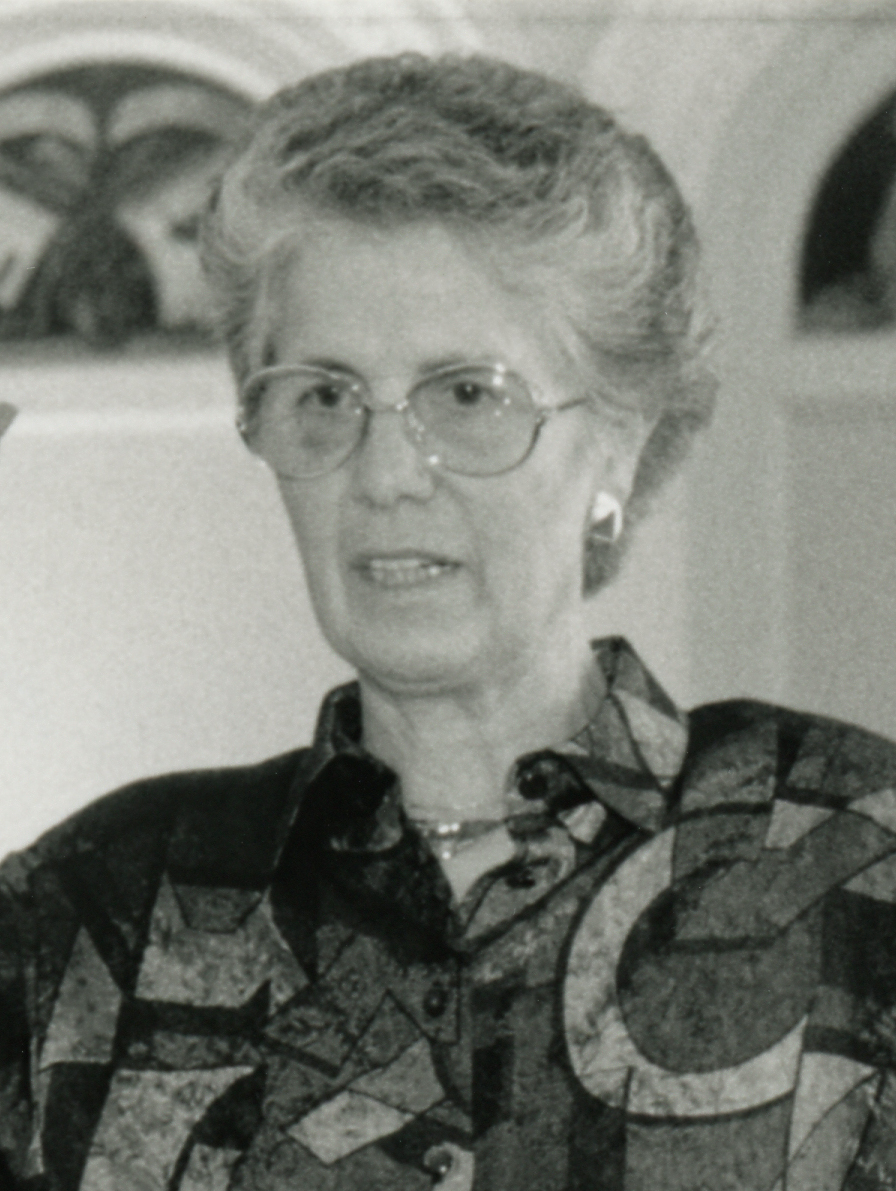
- Marxer in 1991

Mayor of Gamprin
- In office February 1991 – February 1995
- Deputy: Kuno Hasler
- Preceded by: Lorenz Haslerr
- Succeeded by: Donath Oehri

Personal details
- Born: 11 February 1931 (age 95) Gamprin, Liechtenstein
- Party: Progressive Citizens' Party
- Spouse: Willi Marxer (m. 1952; died 1976)
- Children: 5

Maria Marxer (born 11 February 1931) is a former politician from Liechtenstein who served as the mayor of Gamprin from 1991 to 1995. She is the first female Liechtenstein mayor.

== Life ==
Marxer was born on 11 February 1931 in Gamprin as the daughter of Albert Müller and Agnes (née Eberle) as one of four children. She attended school in the municipality and then worked in ceramics design at Schaedler Keramik AG in Nendeln until 1951. After her marriage, she became a housewife.

She was elected as a member of the Gamprin municipal council in 1983 as a member of the Progressive Citizens' Party, being one of the first three women elected to such a position. Marxer was deputy mayor of the municipality from 1987 to 1991, and then mayor from 1991 to 1995, being the first woman to be mayor of a Liechtenstein municipality. She narrowly lost re-election to Donath Oehri in 1995.

She was the only female mayor of Liechtenstein until Maria Kaiser-Eberle was elected as mayor of Ruggell in 2015. Marxer was the president of the Unterland Samaritan Association from 1978 to 1991, and then a member of the board of trustees at the Liechtenstein National Museum.

She married Willi Marxer (15 September 1924 – 6 September 1976), a teacher, and they had five children together. She lives in Gamprin.

== Honours ==
- Liechtenstein: Knight's Cross of the Order of Merit of the Principality of Liechtenstein
