= Herbert Hilbe =

Mayor of Triesenberg from 1987 to 1999

Mayor of Triesenberg
- In office January 1987 – February 1999
- Deputy: Engelbert Schädler (1987–1991); Siegfried Gassner (1991–1995); Hans Schädler (1995–1999)
- Preceded by: Alfons Schädler
- Succeeded by: Hubert Sele

Personal details
- Born: 1 January 1938 Vaduz, Liechtenstein
- Died: 28 December 2021 (aged 83) Triesenberg, Liechtenstein
- Party: Patriotic Union
- Spouse: Irma Beck (m. 1961)
- Children: 5

Herbert Hilbe (1 January 1938 – 28 December 2021) was a police officer and politician from Liechtenstein who served as the Mayor of Triesenberg from 1987 to 1999.

== Life ==
Hilbe was born on 1 January 1938 as the son of Franz Hilbe and Maria (née Eberle) in Vaduz as one of three children. He attended primary school in Triesenberg and then secondary school in Vaduz before training as a mechanic in the municipality from 1954 to 1958. He attended the police academy in St. Gallen and then joined the Liechtenstein National Police in 1960, and then was the deputy head of the criminal investigation department from 1974 until his retirement in 1987.

Hilbe was the vice mayor of Triesenberg from 1979 to 1987 and then the mayor of the municipality from 1987 to 1999 as a member of the Patriotic Union. During his time as mayor, it included the opening of the Guferwald municipal depot in 1988, the construction of a school building in 1994, and the opening of a youth centre in 1998.

He married Irma Beck on 27 May 1961 and they had five children together. He died on 28 December 2021 in Triesenberg, aged 83.

== Honours ==
- Liechtenstein: Knight's Cross of the Order of Merit of the Principality of Liechtenstein (2000)
