= Triesen =

- Municipality
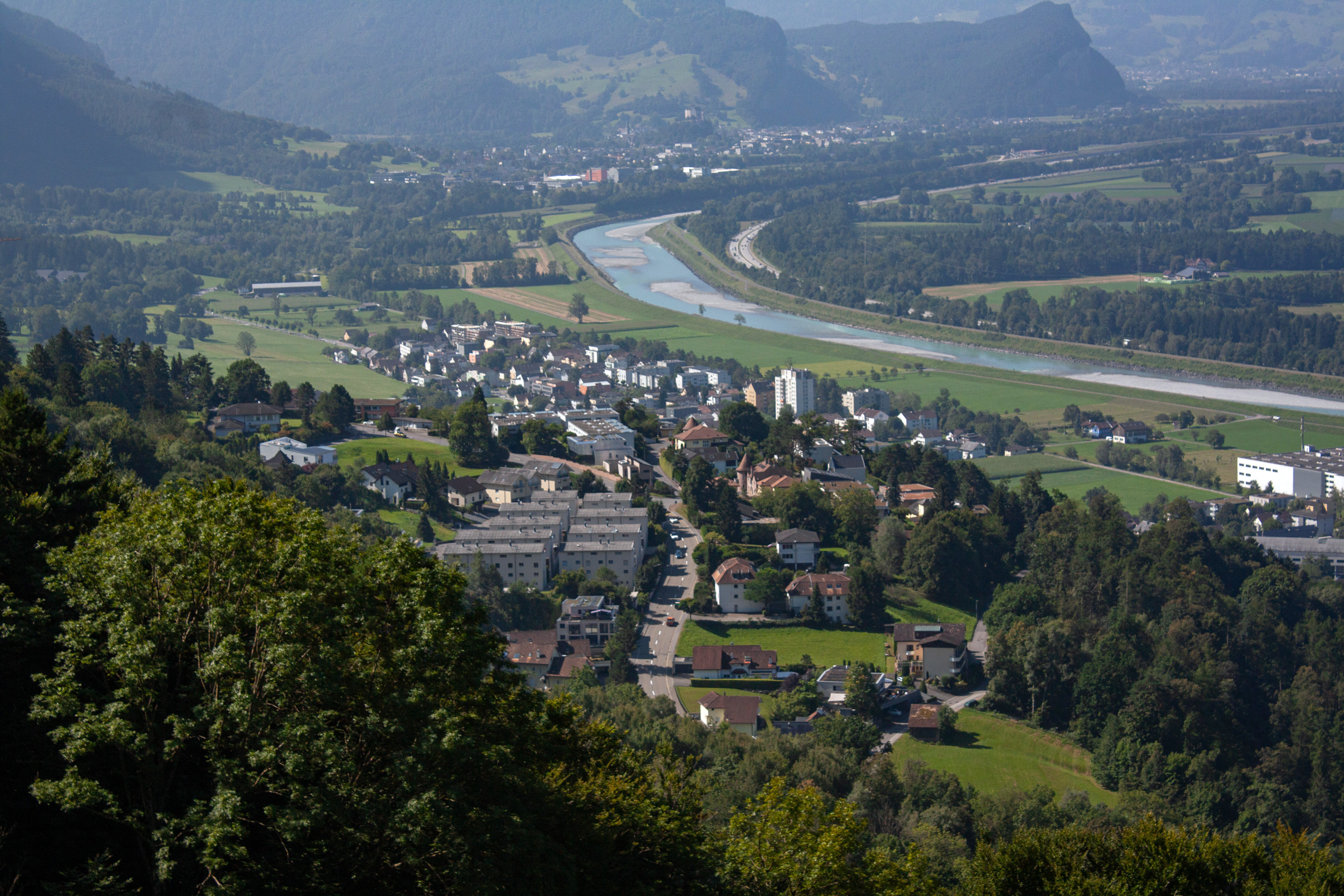

- Flag Coat of arms

- Triesen in Liechtenstein
- Interactive map of Triesen
- Coordinates: 47°6′N 9°32′E
- Country: Liechtenstein
- Electoral district: Oberland
- Villages: Lawena, Valüna

Government
  - Mayor: Daniela Erne (VU)

Area
  - Total: 26.47 km^{2} (10.22 sq mi)
- Elevation: 512 m (1,680 ft)

Population (31-12-2019)
  - Total: 5,275
  - Density: 199.3/km^{2} (516.1/sq mi)
- Time zone: UTC+1 (CET)
  - Summer (DST): CEST
- Postal code: 9495
- Area code: 7002
- ISO 3166 code: LI-09
- Website: www.triesen.li

Triesen (Swiss Standard German pronunciation: [ˈtriːzn̩]; dialectal: Tresa) is the third largest municipality in Liechtenstein. It contains several historic churches dating from the fifteenth century. It also has a weaving mill from 1863 that is considered a historical monument. The population is around 5,275.

== Geography ==
The municipality includes the highest point of Liechtenstein, the Grauspitz, at 2,599 metres (8,527 feet) above sea level. Triesen's lowest point is the Liechtenstein inland canal, at 457 metres (1,499 feet) above sea level. It is located between the Liechtenstein municipalities of Balzers, Schaan, Triesenberg, and Vaduz. Triesen also borders several Swiss municipalities: Wartau (in St. Gallen), along with Maienfeld and Fläsch (both in Grisons). The municipality of Triesen contains the alpine pastures of Lawena, Wang, and Valüna.

== History ==
The settlements of Triesen, as the state archaeologists have found during excavations, were destroyed in natural disasters. The detailed picture of the place Triesen shows that all settlement phases were terminated by the forces of nature. It has been demonstrated that the settlements of the Bronze Age and the Iron Age were repeatedly destroyed by floods and landslides.

The coat of arms of the municipality of Triesen, granted in 1956, consists of a shield with three superimposed silver scythes on a blue background.

== Politics ==
Triesen is locally administered by the mayor and a 10-person municipal council, elected every four years since 1975. The incumbent mayor is Daniela Erne, since 2019.

=== Last election ===
Party	Votes	%	Seats	+/–
Patriotic Union	7,885	42.55	4	–1
Progressive Citizens' Party	6,277	33.87	4	–1
Democrats for Liechtenstein	2,623	14.16	1	+1
Free List	1,745	9.42	1	+1
Total	18,530	100.00	10	0
Valid votes	1,853	94.83		
Invalid votes	71	3.63		
Blank votes	30	1.54		
Total votes	1,954	100.00		
Registered voters/turnout	2,726	71.68		
Source: Gemeindewahlen

== Tourist attractions ==
Attractions in the Triesen area include:

- Die Pfarrkirche St. Gallus, first mentioned in 1458 and rebuilt in 1991–1994, a square hall church
- Die St.-Mamerta-Kapelle, the oldest chapel in the country, built in the 9th or 10th century
- Die Marienkapelle, a Romanesque building from the 13th or 14th century
- Das Kosthaus, workers' housing built in 1873
- Kulturzentrum Gasometer, the municipal cultural centre, opened in 2006
- The Lawena Museum of electricity at Lawena Power Station (see Lawena)

== Notable people ==
- Franz Burgmeier (born 1982 in Triesen) retired footballer, who last played as a midfielder for FC Vaduz
- Ursula Konzett (born 1959 in Triesen) a former Alpine skier

== Gallery ==
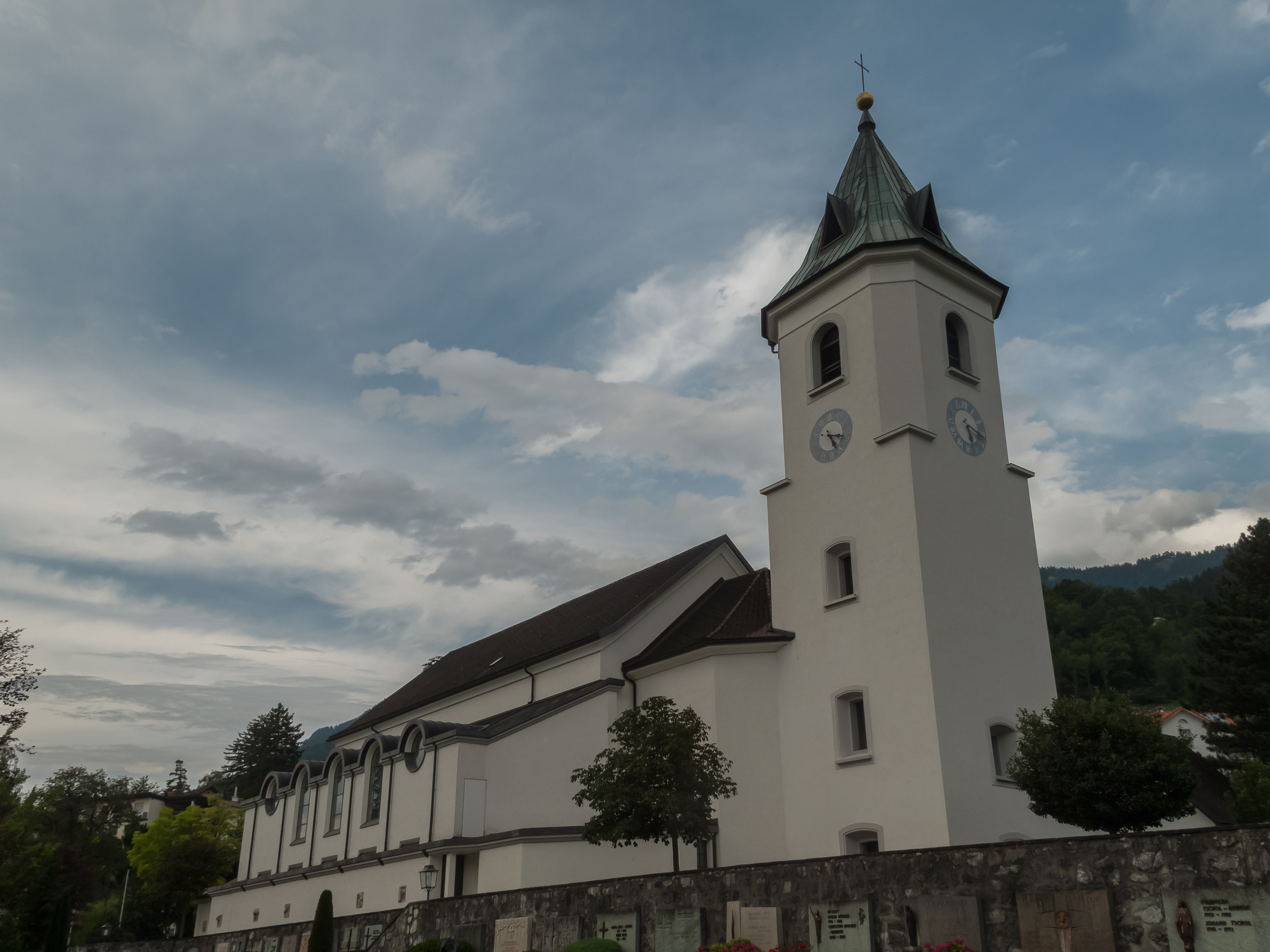
Parish church Sankt Gallus

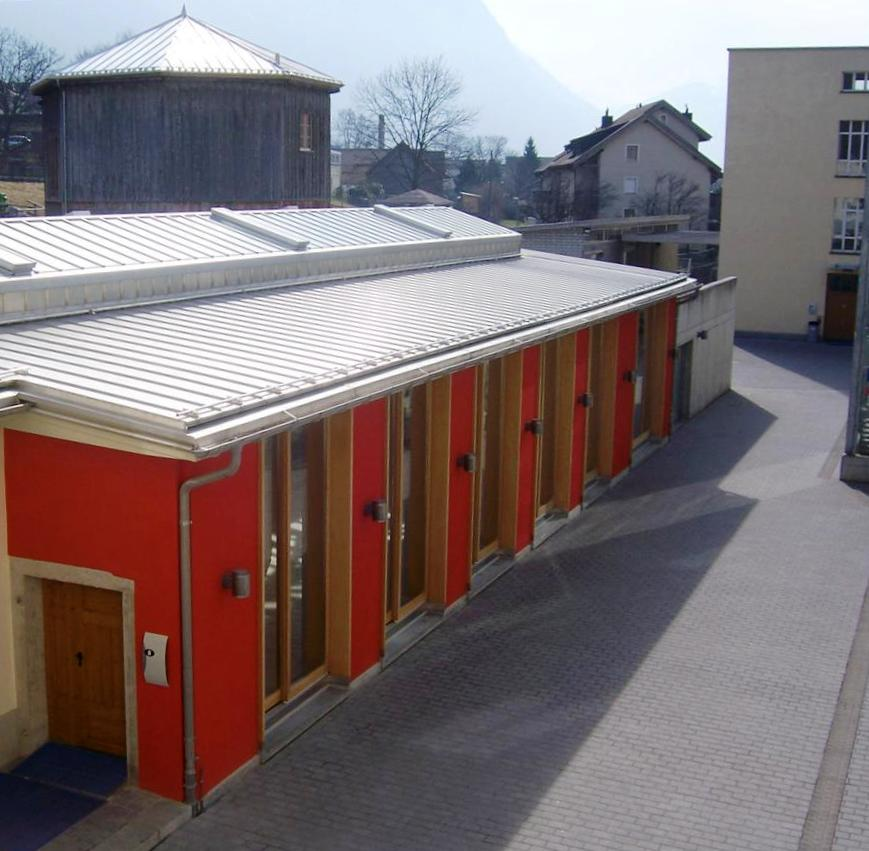
Cultural Centre Gasometer
