= S-Bahn =

Type of commuter rail system in Europe

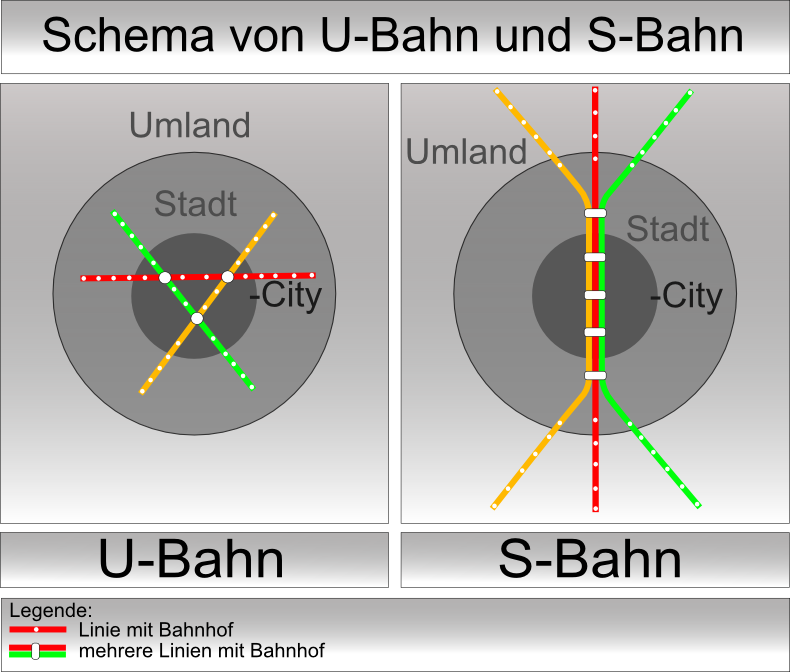
Diagram comparing typical rapid transit (U-Bahn, left) and S-Bahn (right) networks. The S-Bahn combines suburban branches into a high-frequency corridor across the city centre. Actual layouts vary by city.

S-Bahn (/ˈɛsbɑːn/ ESS-bahn, German: [ˈɛsˌbaːn]; lit. 'S-train') is a type of hybrid commuter rail and rapid transit service, originating in German-speaking countries. In general, S-Bahn systems link suburbs with the city centre at moderate speeds, while continuing across the urban core over a central high-frequency corridor where multiple lines converge, where they provide a rapid means of travel across the city. The name S-Bahn derives from the German terms Schnellbahn (lit. 'rapid train'), Stadtschnellbahn (lit. 'rapid city train'), and Stadtbahn (lit. 'city train'; not to be confused with the modern Stadtbahn).

The first such network, the Berlin S-Bahn, began operation in December 1930 and inspired similar systems across Europe. The term "S-Bahn" has since become a generic term for hybrid suburban–urban rail networks, with counterparts such as the S‑tog in Denmark, S‑Trein/Train S in Belgium, Esko/S‑lines in the Czech Republic, Linee S in Italy, and SKM in Poland. The S-Bahn is also recognized as a train category in several European countries. The concept also influenced systems outside the German-speaking world, including the Réseau Express Régional (RER) in Paris and its counterparts in other cities.

S-Bahn network design principles are also present in several regional rail and commuter rail systems in the English speaking world primarily in Australia and New Zealand. The commuter rail systems of Auckland and of Australia's three largest state capitals (Sydney, Melbourne, and Brisbane) all have city centre viaducts or tunnels which enable through-running service for electrified suburban trains. In the US, SEPTA Regional Rail in Philadelphia is similar to an S-Bahn, using a city centre tunnel to enable extensive through-running. The San Francisco Bay Area's BART also uses a similar trunk-and-branches design with the Transbay Tube forming part of an interlined high-frequency trunk between West Oakland and Daly City.

Sydney and Philadelphia have also adopted a similar route naming system to European S-Bahn systems by using a letter (“T” in Sydney and “R” in Philadelphia) and a number to represent each line. Philadelphia dropped this naming system in 2010 in favour of giving each line the name of its terminal station.

== Characteristics ==
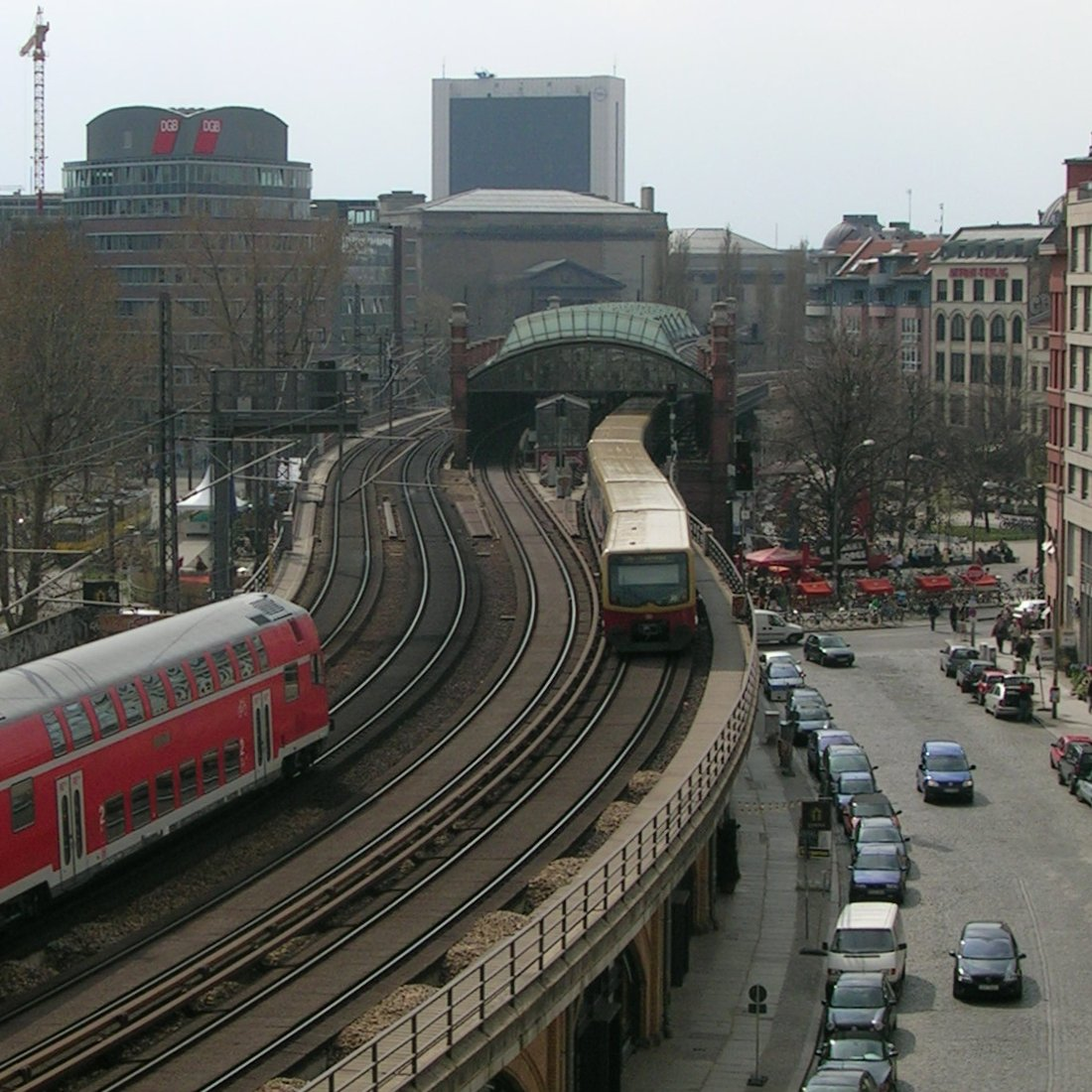
Berlin Stadtbahn. The right side tracks belong to the S-Bahn and serve the station in the distance (Hackescher Markt), while the other two tracks are used by non-stopping mainline trains.

There is no single, universally accepted definition of an S-Bahn system. In general, in the outer parts of a city, S-Bahn trains operate in a manner similar to conventional commuter rail, linking outlying towns with the city centre at moderate speeds. Unlike most commuter railways, however, S-Bahn services typically continue beyond the city’s main railway station, crossing the urban core on a high-frequency corridor where multiple routes converge. Stations along these central sections are spaced farther apart than on a typical rapid transit system (U-Bahn), enabling higher average speeds and providing a rapid means of travel across the city, even for passengers not travelling to or from the suburbs.

The Copenhagen S-tog, for example, operates at speeds of up to 120 kilometres per hour (75 mph), while the Rhine-Main S-Bahn operates at up to 140 km/h (87 mph). In densely populated areas, S-Bahn lines can link multiple urban centres rather than serving a single core city, as with the Rhine-Ruhr S-Bahn, which interconnects the cities and suburbs of the Ruhr region.

Many large S-Bahn systems have a dedicated underground or elevated trunk line through the central city, that individual suburban branches feed into, creating a high frequency corridor. In many cases, this is a grade-separated line in the city centre with close stop spacing and a high frequency, similar to metro systems. A good example of this is Berliner Stadtbahn, the main east–west axis of Berlin’s S-Bahn, which is regarded as a tourist attraction.

Outside city centres, S-Bahn services often run on existing local or regional railway infrastructure, sometimes parallel to long-distance tracks. In some cases, new infrastructure has been purpose-built, such as the Køgebugt (Køge Bay) line in Copenhagen, constructed between 1971 and 1983, or the S-Bahn tunnel between Hamburg Central Station and Altona, completed in 1979.

S-Bahn systems typically use electric trains supplied by overhead lines or a third rail; in Hamburg, both systems are used depending on the line.

Station spacing and service frequency vary widely. In suburban sections, stations may be more than 5 kilometres (3.1 mi) apart and headways may extend to 30 or 60 minutes during off-peak hours. In contrast, central trunk lines in larger systems can operate at intervals as short as two minutes.

Rolling stock reflects this hybrid function: interiors are designed with standing room for those making short trip, but usually offer more seating comfort than metro trains.

S-Bahn systems are typically integrated into a city’s wider public transport network, with unified ticketing and convenient interchanges. In cities with both S-Bahn and metro systems, tickets are often valid across both, and interchange stations are common. Examples include the S-Bahn Mitteldeutschland, which serves Leipzig and Halle, and the Rostock S-Bahn, a smaller regional system

== Etymology ==
=== Germany, Austria and Switzerland ===
The name S-Bahn is an abbreviation of the German Stadtschnellbahn ("city rapid railway") and was introduced in December 1930 in Berlin. The name was introduced at the time of the reconstruction of the suburban commuter train tracks— the first section to be electrified was a section of the Berlin–Stettin railway from Berlin Nordbahnhof to Bernau bei Berlin station in 1924, leading to the formation of the Berlin S-Bahn.

The main line Berliner Stadtbahn ("Berlin city railway") was electrified with a 750 volt third rail in 1928 (some steam trains ran until 1929) and the circle line Berliner Ringbahn was electrified in 1929. The electrification continued on the radial suburban railway tracks along with the timetable moving to a rapid transit model with no more than a 20-minute headway per line where a number of lines overlapped on the main line. The system peaked during the 1936 Summer Olympics in Berlin with trains scheduled at least every 2 minutes.

The idea of heavy rail rapid transit was not unique to Berlin. Hamburg had an electric railway between the central station (Hauptbahnhof) and Altona which opened in 1906, and in 1934 the system adopted the S-Bahn label from Berlin. In the same year in Denmark, Copenhagen's S-tog opened its first line. In Austria, Vienna had its Stadtbahn main line electrified in 1908 and also introduced the term Schnellbahn ("rapid railway") in 1954 for its planned commuter railway network, which started operations in 1962. The S-Bahn label was sometimes used as well, but the name was only switched to S-Bahn Wien in 2005.

As for Munich, in 1938 the Nazi government broke ground for an S-Bahn-like rapid transport system in Lindwurmstraße near what is now Goetheplatz station on line U6. The system was supposed to run through tunnels in the city centre. The planning process mainly consisted of the bundling and interconnecting of existing suburban and local railways, plus the construction of a few new lines. Plans and construction work - including the building shell of Goetheplatz station - came to a very early halt during World War II and were not pursued in its aftermath. Very extensive nowadays, Munich's existing S-Bahn system, together with the first two U-Bahn lines, only began to operate prior to the 1972 Summer Olympics.

The term S-Bahn was a registered wordmark of Deutsche Bahn until 14 March 2012, when, at the request of a transportation association, the Federal Patent Court of Germany ordered its removal from the records of the German Patent and Trade Mark Office. Prior to this Deutsche Bahn collected a royalty of 0.4 cents per train kilometer for the use of the term.

=== China ===
China has a history of suburban railways (Chinese: 市郊铁路, which starts with an S in pinyin, Shìjiāo tiělù). In the early People's Republic of China, these trains were slow, stopping trains between a city and its suburbs, with only scarce frequency and limited capacity, not quite in the same sense as a German S-Bahn. They were gradually abolished over time as the railway improved.

However, a modern form in the sense of a rapid urban-suburban railway has since returned in 2011, when the Beijing Suburban Railway started to use S-prefixed numbers and was integrated into the urban transport system. Since then, the concept has spread to various metropolitan cities in China (see suburban and regional rail in China).

=== Denmark ===
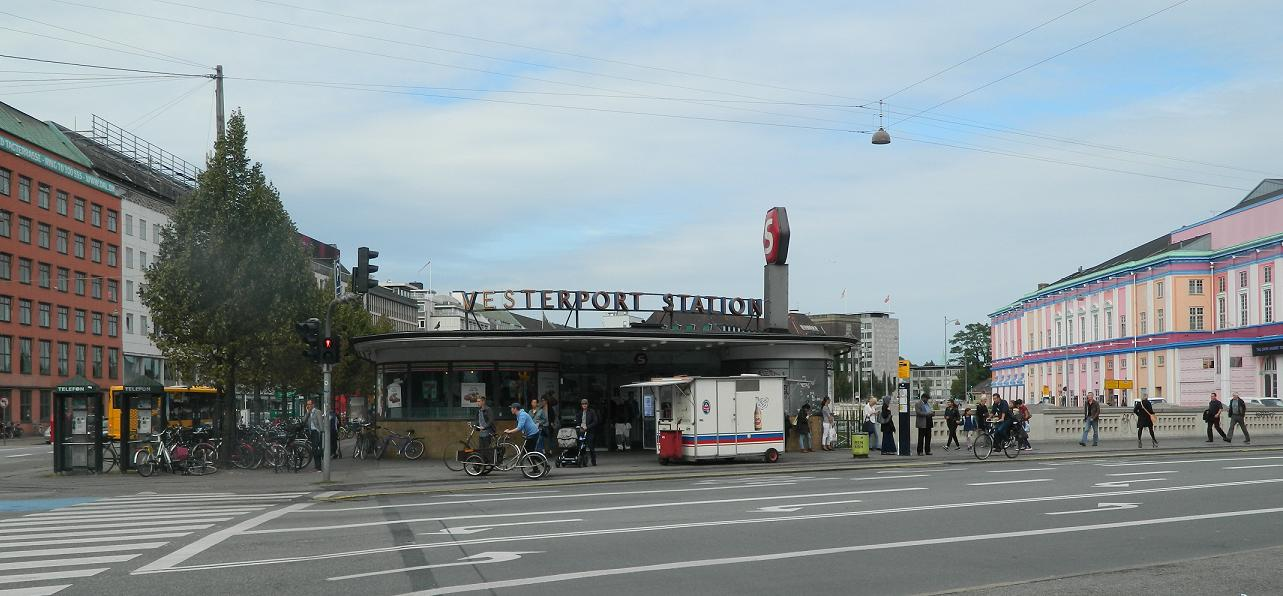
Vesterport S-train station has three entrances. This is the main one.

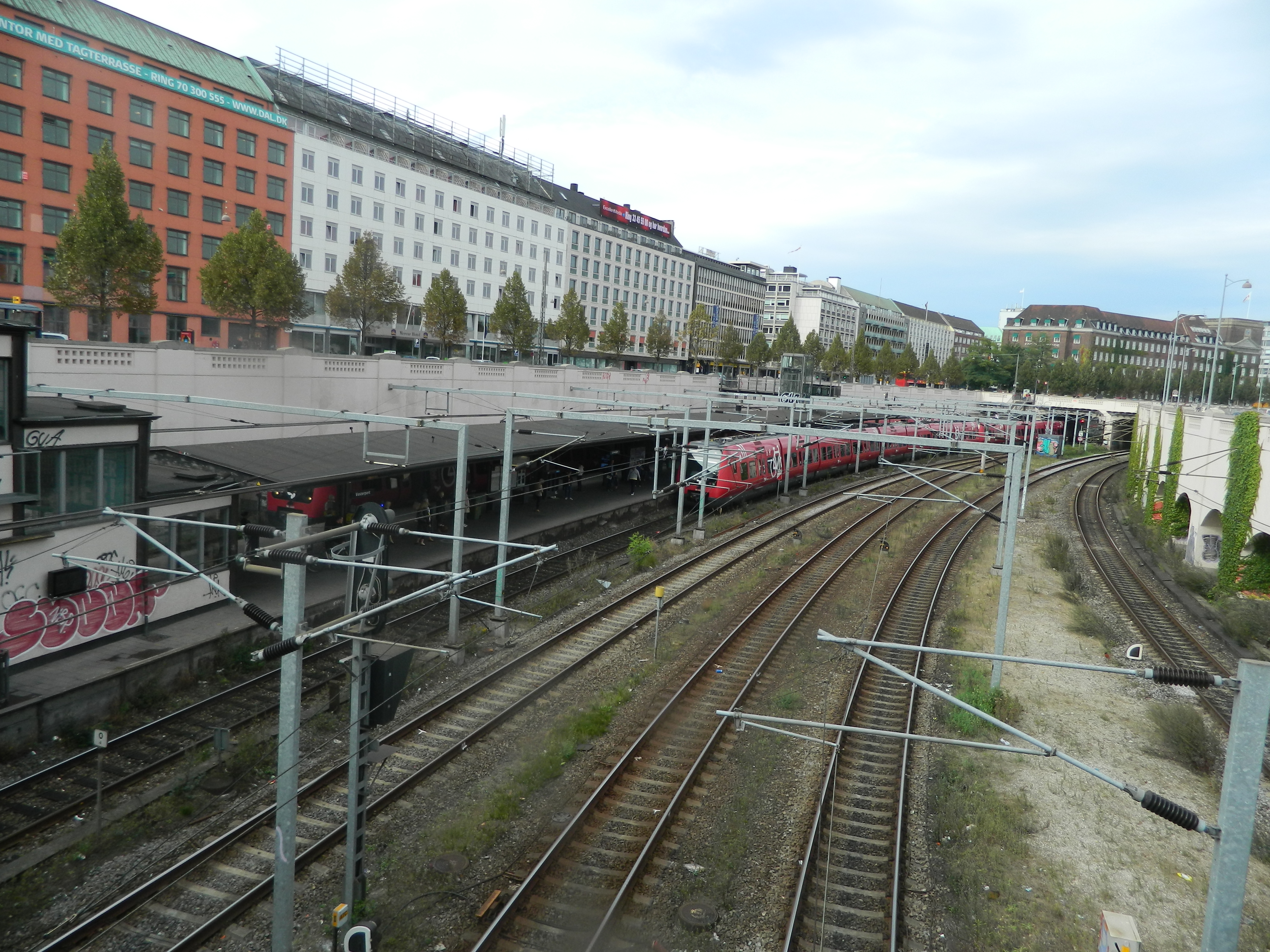
Vesterport station is located below street level, but is not under ground. Other trains do not stop here, solely S-trains. Compare with picture of Berlin's S-Bahn above. Same concept.

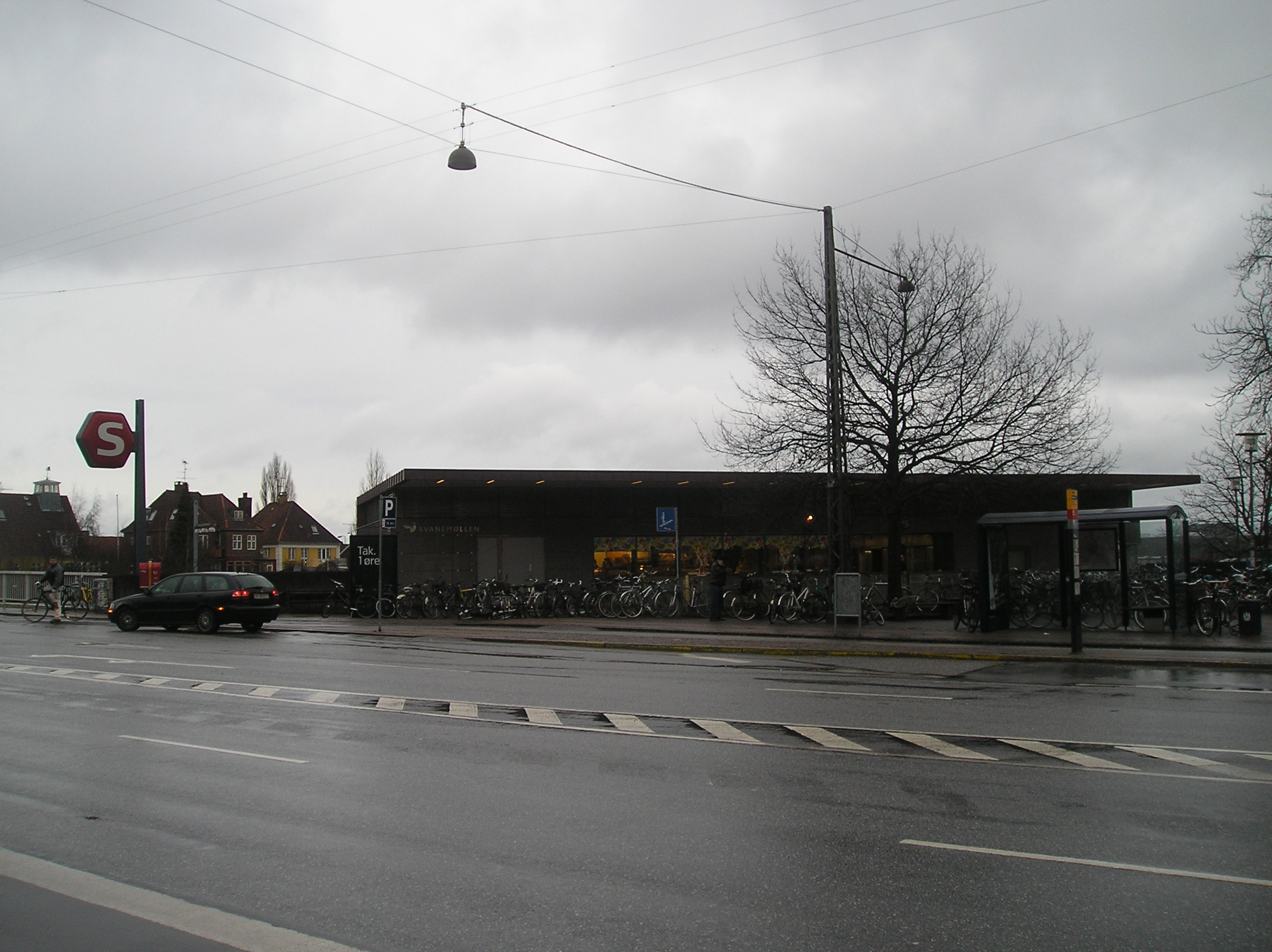
Svanemøllen Station, main entrance

The "S" stood for "station". Just before the opening of the first line in the Copenhagen S-train network, the newspaper Politiken on 17 February 1934 held a competition about the name, which in Danish became known as Den elektriske enquete or "The electrical survey" (as the Copenhagen S-trains would become the first electrical railways in Denmark). But since an "S" already was put up at all the stations, weeks before the survey, the result became S-tog which means "S-train". This was also just a few years after the S-trains had opened in Berlin and Hamburg. Today the Copenhagen S-trains uses six lines and serves 86 stations, 32 of them are located inside the (quite tiny) municipality borders. Each line uses 6 t.p.h (trains per hour) in each direction, with exception of the (yellow) F-line. The F-line has departures in each direction every five minutes, or 12 t.p.h. service .

=== Poland ===
These systems are called SKM, short for Szybka Kolej Miejska, meaning Rapid Urban Railway. It corresponds to the German term Stadtschnellbahn which means City Rapid Railway, although in Poland, the S means fast instead of city.

The first system in Poland was in Tricity, created in 1952, followed by Warsaw where the current form began in 2005.

=== Netherlands ===
The S stands for Sprinter, which will be used as the prefix in the route number system starting in 2027.

== History ==
The history of the S-Bahn in present-day Germany begins in the 19th century in Prussia.

=== Early steam services ===
In 1882, the growing number of steam-powered trains around Berlin prompted the Prussian State Railway to construct separate rail tracks for suburban traffic. The Berliner Stadtbahn connected Berlin's eight intercity rail stations which were spread throughout the city (all but the Stettiner Bahnhof which today is a pure S-Bahn station known as Berlin Nordbahnhof; as the city Stettin today is Polish city Szczecin). A lower fare for the newly founded Berliner Stadt-, Ring- und Vorortbahn (Berlin City, Circular and Suburban Rail) was introduced on 1 October 1891. This fare and the increased frequency of trains made the short-distance service stand out from other railways.

The second suburban railway was the Hamburg-Altonaer Stadt- und Vorortbahn connecting Hamburg with Altona and Blankenese. The Altona office of the Prussian State Railway established the electric powered railway in 1906.

=== Electricity ===
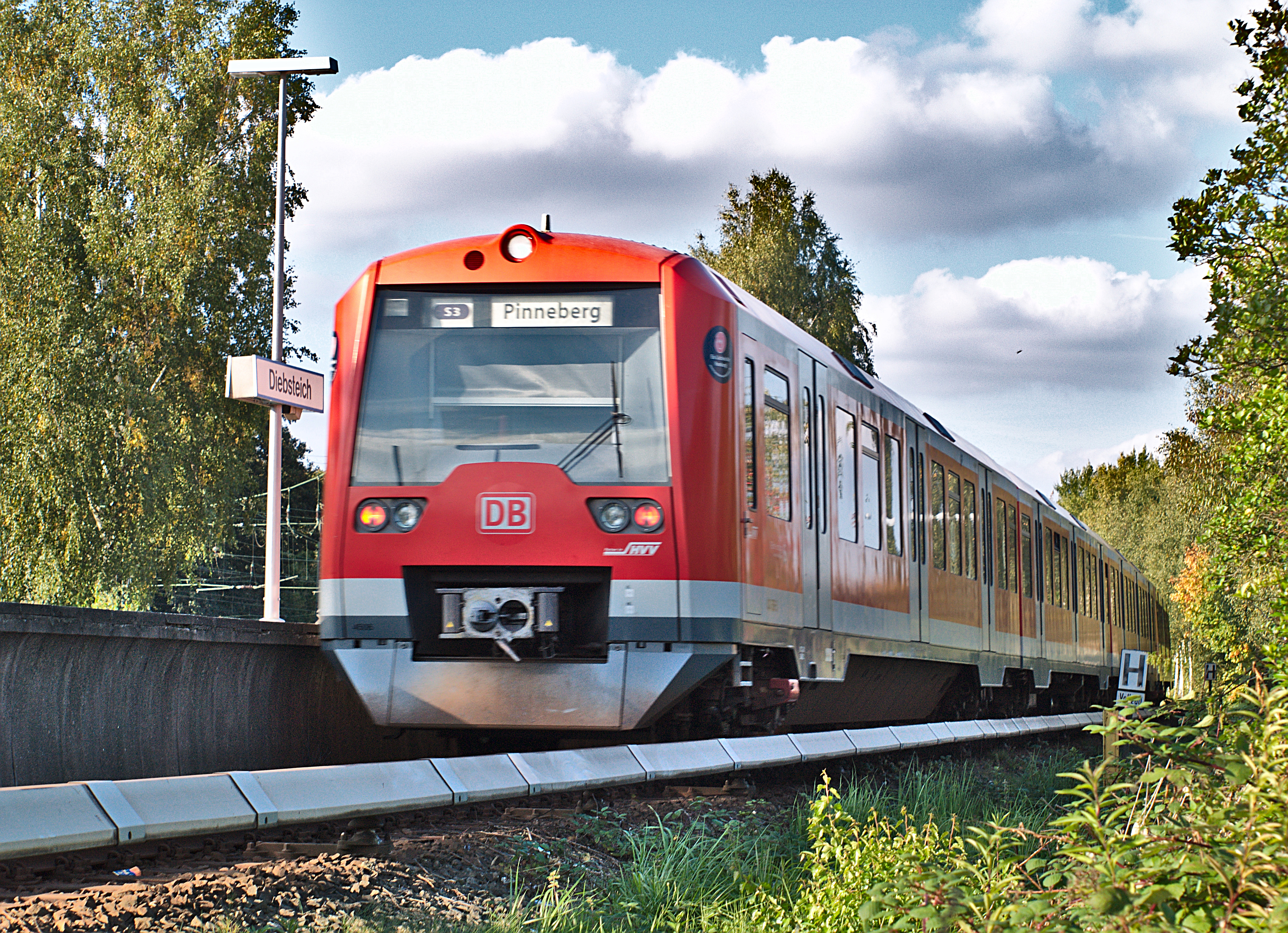
The Hamburg S-Bahn third rail system

The beginning of the 20th century saw the first electric trains, which in Germany operated at 15,000 V on overhead lines. The Berliner Stadt-, Ring- und Vorortbahn instead implemented direct current multiple units running on 750 V from a third rail. In 1924, the first electrified route went into service. The third rail was chosen because it made both the modifications of the rail tracks (especially in tunnels and under bridges) and the side-by-side use of electric and steam trains easier.

To set it apart from the subterranean U-Bahn, the term S-Bahn replaced Stadt-, Ring- und Vorortbahn in 1930.

The Hamburg service had established an alternating current line in 1907 with the use of multiple units with slam doors. In 1940 a new system with 1200 V DC third rail and modern electric multiple units with sliding doors was integrated on this line (on the same tracks). The old system with overhead wire remained up to 1955. The other lines of the network still used steam and later Diesel power. In 1934, the Hamburg-Altonaer Stadt- und Vorortbahn was renamed as S-Bahn.

== Systems by country ==
S-Bahn networks in Austria

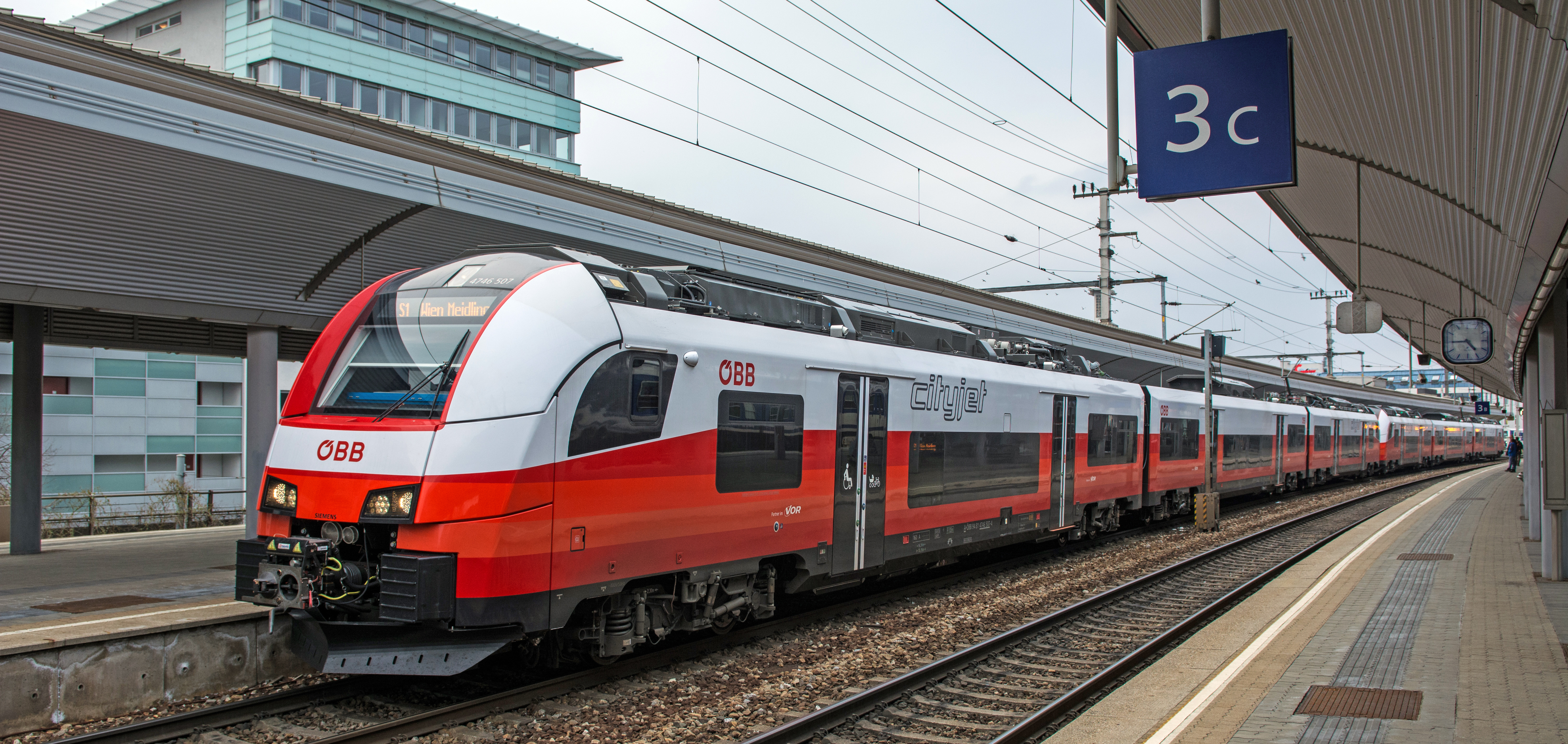
A Siemens Desiro Mainline EMU of the Vienna S-Bahn

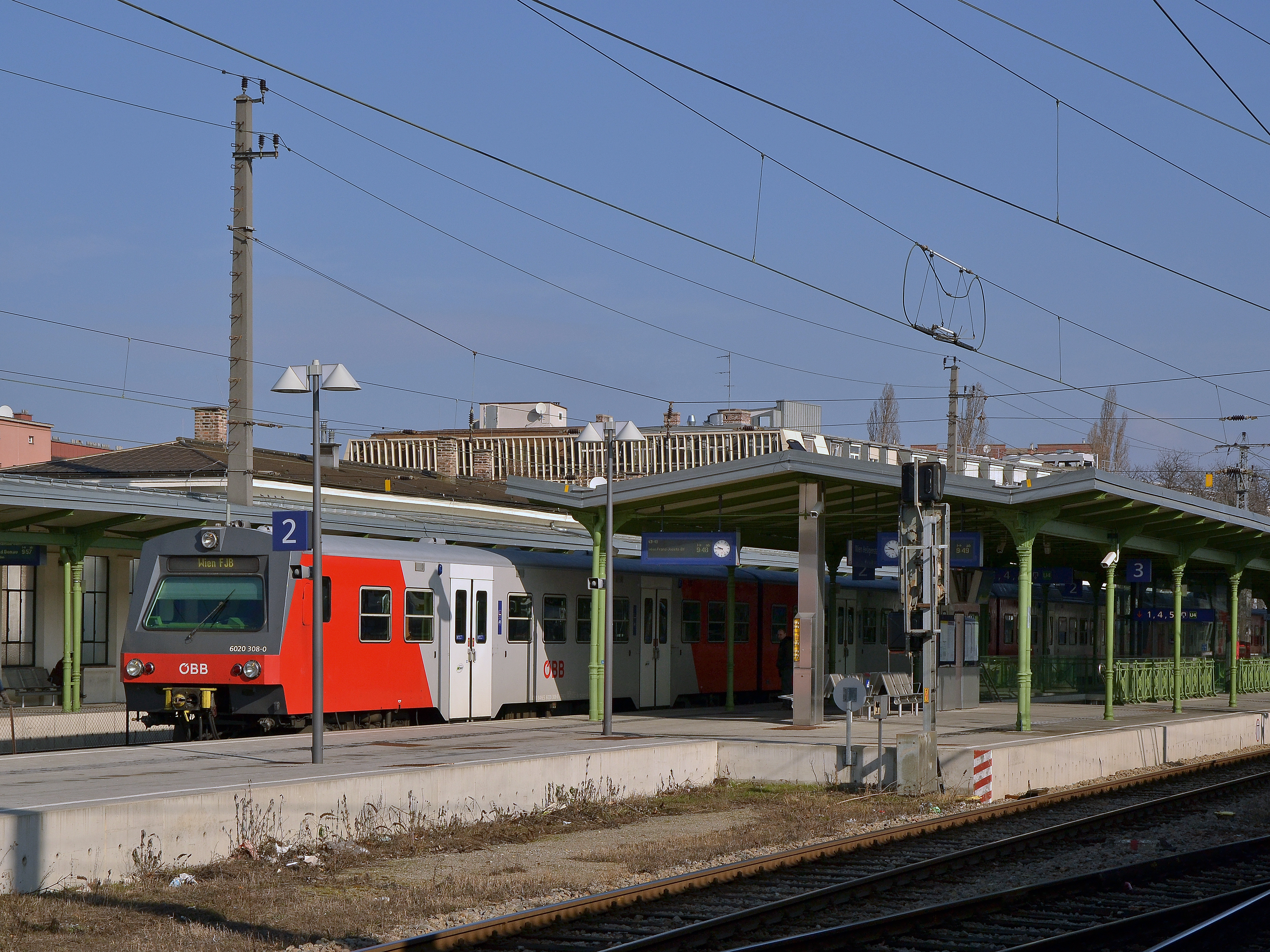
A class 4020 EMU on Vienna S-Bahn line S40

Schematic map of Copenhagen S-train

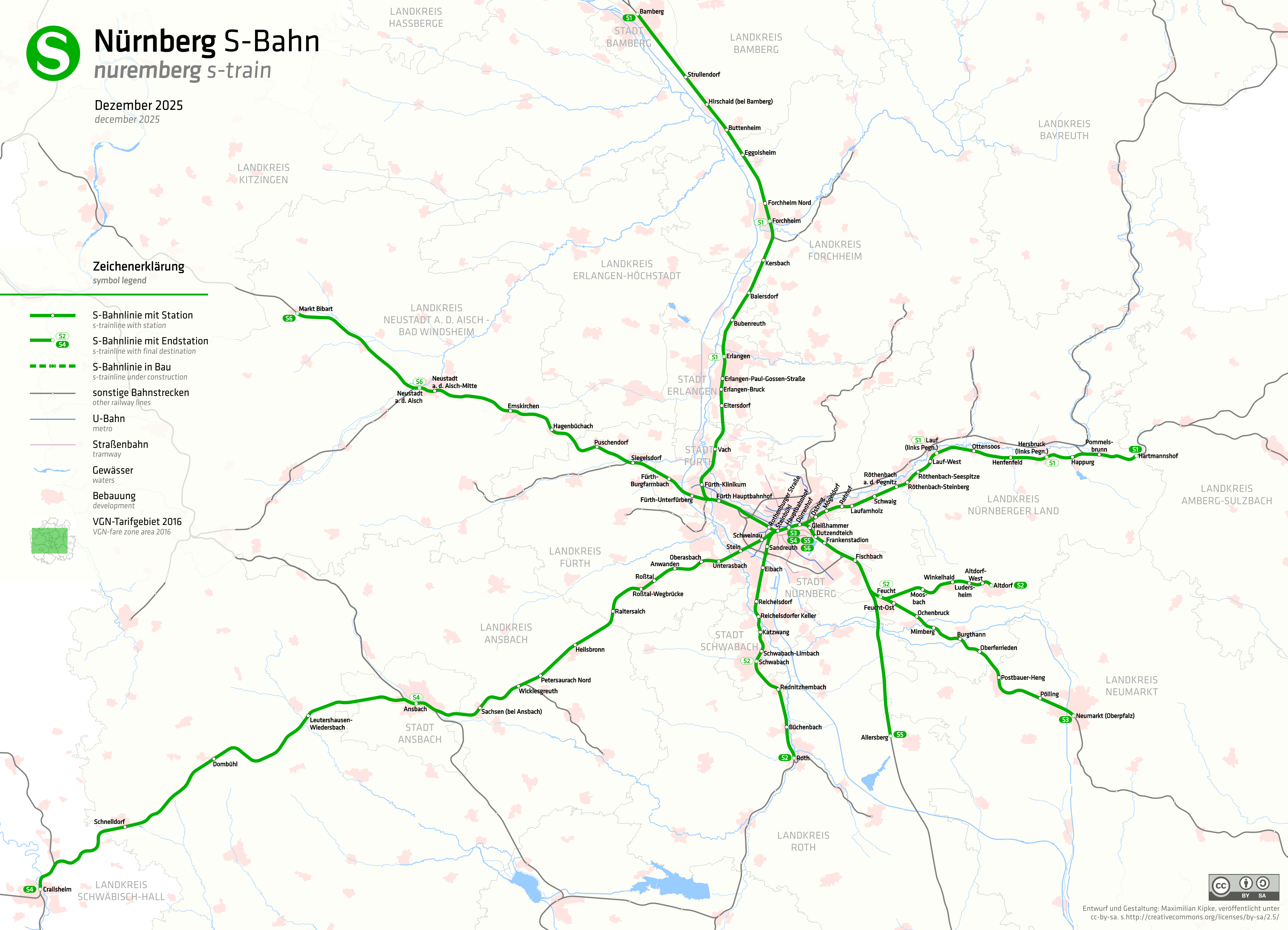
Map of the Nuremberg S-Bahn network

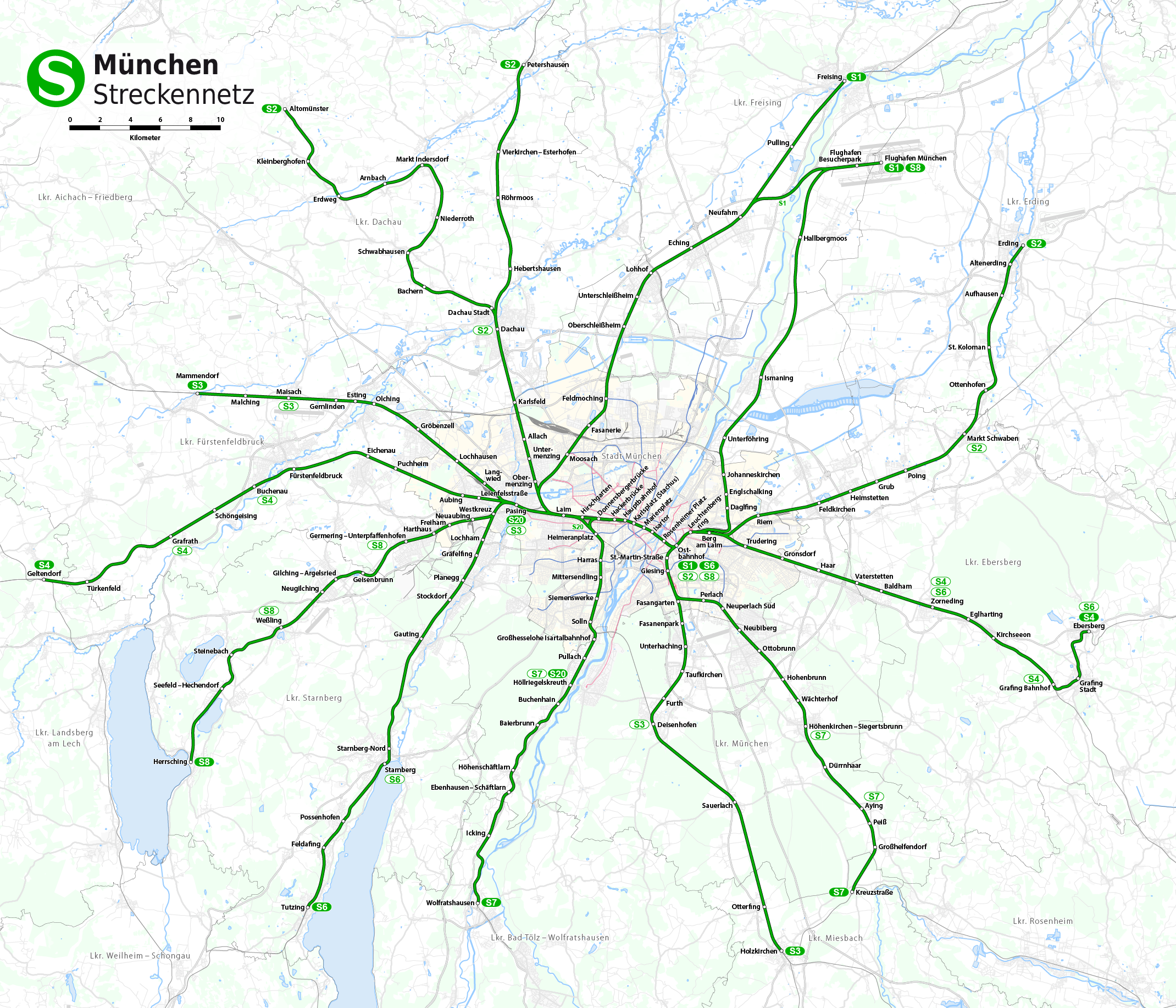
Map of the Munich S-Bahn network

Map of S-Bahn networks in Germany

=== Austria ===
Austrian S-Bahn logo

The oldest and largest S-Bahn system in Austria is the Vienna S-Bahn, which predominantly uses non exclusive rails tracks outside of Vienna. It was established in 1962, although it was usually referred to as Schnellbahn until 2005. The white "S" on a blue circle used as the logo is said to reflect the layout of the central railway line in Vienna. However, it has now been changed for a more stylized version that is used all through Austria, except Salzburg. The rolling stock was blue for a long time, reflecting the logo colour, but red is used uniformly for nearly all local traffic today.

Salzburg S-Bahn logo

In 2004, the Salzburg S-Bahn went into service as the first Euroregion S-Bahn, crossing the border to the neighbouring towns of Freilassing and Berchtesgaden in Bavaria. The network is served by three corporations: the Berchtesgadener Land Bahn (BLB)(S4), the Austrian Federal Railways (German: Österreichischen Bundesbahn / ÖBB)(S2 and S3) and the Salzburger Lokalbahn (SLB)(S1 and S11). The Salzburg S-Bahn logo is only different one, it is a white S on a light blue circle.

In 2006 the regional train line in the Rhine Valley in the state of Vorarlberg has been renamed to Vorarlberg S-Bahn. It is a three lines network, operated by the Montafonerbahn and the ÖBB. It was later expanded. Presently, a frequent service, the S1, operates between Bludenz to Lindau-Reutin (D) via Bregenz. In addition, an hourly service, S3 (ÖBB), connects Bregenz with St. Margrethen (CH), and another service (S2) operates between Feldkirch (A), Schaan (FL) and Buchs SG (CH). The Montafonerbahn runs the S4.

The S-Bahn Steiermark has been inaugurated in December 2007 in Styria, built to connect its capital city Graz with the rest of the metropolitan area, currently the following lines are active: S1, S11, S3, S31, S5, S51, S6, S61, S7, S8 and S9. The network is operated by three railway companies: the Graz-Köflacher Bahn (GKB) (lines: S6, S61 and S7), the ÖBB (lines: S1, S3, S5, S51, S8 and S9) and the Steiermärkische Landesbahnen (StB) (lines: S11 and S31).

In December 2007 as well the Tyrol S-Bahn opened, running from Hall in Tirol in the east to Innsbruck Central Station and Telfs in the west and from Innsbruck to Steinach am Brenner. Class 4024 EMUs are used as rolling stock on this network.

In 2010 the S-Bahn Kärnten was opened in the state of Carinthia and currently consists of 7 lines operated by ÖBB.

The youngest network is the S-Bahn Oberösterreich in the Greater Linz area of the state of Upper Austria, which was inaugurated in December 2016. It is a 5 line system operated by Stern & Hafferl and the ÖBB.

=== Belgium ===
Brussels S train logo

Since 2015, the trains of the Brussels Regional Express Network (French: Réseau Express Régional Bruxellois, RER; Dutch: Gewestelijk Expresnet, GEN) of the NMBS/SNCB belong to train category S and are referred to as S train (Dutch: 'S-trein', French: train S, German: 'S-Züge'). In 2018, local trains of NMBS/SNCB in and around Antwerp, Ghent, Liège and Charleroi changed to the train category S train as well.

=== China ===
There are stopping trains starting with S (which stands for 市郊, suburb) for commuters around big cities, for example, the Beijing Suburban Railway.

=== Czech Republic ===
Czech Esko logo

In the Czech Republic, integrated commuter rail systems exist in Prague and Moravian-Silesian Region. Both systems are called Esko, which is what the letter S is usually called in Czech. Esko Prague has been operating since 9 December 2007 as a part of the Prague Integrated Transport system. Esko Moravian-Silesian Region began operating on 14 December 2008 as a part of the ODIS Integrated Transport system serving the Moravian-Silesian Region. Both systems are primarily operated by České dráhy. Several shorter lines are operated by other companies.

=== Denmark ===
Copenhagen S-tog logo

Copenhagen S-train connects the city centre, other inner and outer boroughs and suburbs with each other. The average distance between stations is 2.0 km, shorter in the city core and inner boroughs, longer at the end of lines that serve suburbs. Of the 86 stations, 32 are located within the central parts of the city. Some stations are located around 40 km from Copenhagen city centre. For this reason the fares vary depending on distances. The one-day passes which the tourists buy are valid only in the most central parts of the S-train system. On weekdays each line has a departure every 10 minutes with the exception of the F-line, on which a train departs every five minutes. Where several lines converge on a common piece of track there could be as many as 30 trains per hour in each direction. On Sundays the seven lines are reduced to four lines, but all stations are served at least every 10 minutes. The three railway stations at Amager have a local service that is the equivalent of the S-trains.

The Copenhagen Metro opened in 2002 as a complement to the already existing S-train system. Copenhagen's S-train system is the only one in the country. Outside Denmark, in cities where both exist, is it far from unusual that a metro system later has been complemented with S-trains. The branch towards Køge (the southernmost S-train station in Copenhagen's S-network) has a rather unique history, as it was built in the 1970s where no previous railway ever had existed.

=== Germany ===
German S-Bahn logo

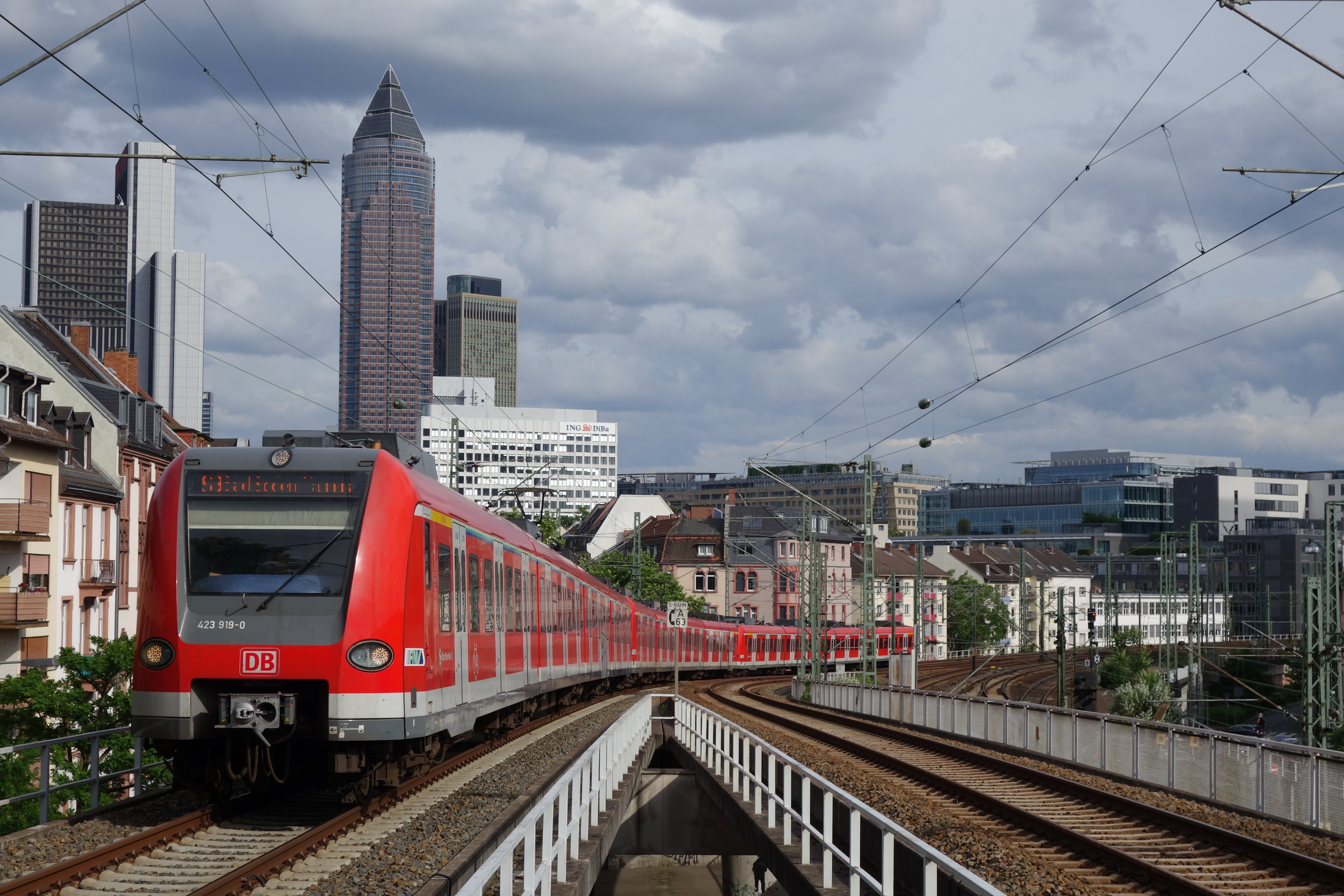
DBAG Class 423 of Rhine-Main S-Bahn approaching the elevated section of Frankfurt West station

The trains of the Berlin and Hamburg S-Bahn systems ran on separate tracks from the beginning. When other cities started implementing their systems in the 1960s, they mostly had to use the existing intercity rail tracks, and they still more or less use such tracks.

The central intercity stations of Frankfurt, Leipzig, Munich and Stuttgart are terminal stations, so all four cities have monocentric S-Bahn networks. The S-Bahn trains use as their core segment a tunnel under the central station and the city centre (e.g. Munich S-Bahn Stammstrecke and the upcoming Zweite Stammstrecke).

The high number of large cities in the Ruhr area promotes a polycentric network connecting all cities and suburbs. The S-Bahn Rhein-Ruhr, as it is called, features few tunnels, and its routes are longer than those of other networks. The Ruhr S-Bahn is the only S-Bahn network to be run by more than one corporation in Germany, and the Salzburg S-Bahn holds a similar distinction in Austria. Most Swiss S-Bahn systems are multi-corporation networks, however.

Most German S-Bahn networks have a unique ticket system, separated from the Deutsche Bahn rates, instead connected to the city ticket system used for U-bahns and local buses. The S-Bahn of Hanover, however, operates under five different rates due to its large expanse.

One S-Bahn system is no longer in operation: the Erfurt S-Bahn which operated from 1976 until 1995 and was an 8.6 km (5.3 mi) single-line diesel-powered system which consisted of four stations from Erfurt Central Station to Erfurt Berliner Straße station in the then newly built northern suburbs of Erfurt.

There are several S-Bahn or S-Bahn-like systems in planning, such as the Augsburg S-Bahn (network plan), the Lübeck S-Bahn (network plan) and the tri-country Bodensee S-Bahn.

The Stadtbahn Karlsruhe (a tram-train network) uses the green "S" logo for stations in the outskirts and has its lines indicated by an "S" in front of the line number, but does not refer to itself as S-Bahn. The logo also can't be found on the trains, contrary to most other systems where it's placed somewhere on the sides or at the front of the trains. A new city-centre tunnel opened at the end of 2021, however the blue U-Bahn logo is not used either for it. To mark those tunnel stations, a yellow U is used, which is unique and can only be found there.

Despite their names, the Ortenau S-Bahn (Offenburg) and the Danube-Iller Regional S-Bahn (Ulm/Neu-Ulm, opened 2020) are Regionalbahn services.

The following networks are currently in operation:

S-Bahn	Area of Responsibility	Authority	Opened	Lines	Kilometrage	Rolling Stock	Company	Expiry of contract
Berlin S-Bahn	Berlin, Potsdam	VBB	1924	16	331 km	480, 481/482, 483/484	S-Bahn Berlin GmbH	2017
Breisgau S-Bahn	Freiburg im Breisgau	RVF	1997 (Note: first electric services started 2019.)	7	50 km	Alstom Coradia Continental, Stadler Regio-Shuttle RS1	DB Regio AG (electric), SWEG (diesel)	
Bremen S-Bahn	Bremen, Bremerhaven, Oldenburg	VBN	2010	4	270 km	Alstom Coradia Continental	NordWestBahn	2021
Dresden S-Bahn	Dresden	VVO	1992	3	128 km	143 + Doppelstockwagen, 146.0 + Doppelstockwagen	DB Regio Südost	2027
Hamburg S-Bahn	Hamburg	HVV	1934	6	144 km	472, 474, 490	DB Regio AG	2033
Hanover S-Bahn	Hanover, Paderborn, Hildesheim, Minden	GVH, nph	2000	9 (+ 1)	385 km	424, 425	DB Regio Nord	2020
Mitteldeutschland S-Bahn	Leipzig, Halle (Saale), Zwickau, Bitterfeld, Wurzen, Borna	MDV, VBB, VMS, VVO	2013 (Note: originally established as two unconnected systems in 1969, connected in 2004 and substantially enlarged in 2013.)	10	802 km	Bombardier Talent 2, 143 + Doppelstockwagen	DB Regio Südost	2025/2030
Mittelelbe S-Bahn	Magdeburg	marego	1974	1	130 km	425	DB Regio Südost	2028
Munich S-Bahn	Munich	MVV	1972	8	434 km	423, 420	DB Regio AG	2017
Nuremberg S-Bahn	Nuremberg, Ansbach, Bamberg, Erlangen, Fürth, Schwabach	VGN	1987	6	320 km	425, Coradia Continental, Talent 2	DB Regio Bayern	2030
Ortenau-S-Bahn	Offenburg, Straßburg	TGO	1998	4	170 km	Stadler Regio-Shuttle RS1	SWEG	
Rhine-Main S-Bahn	Frankfurt, Wiesbaden, Mainz, Darmstadt, Offenbach am Main	RMV	1978	9	303 km	423, 430	DB Regio AG	2029, 2036
RheinNeckar S-Bahn	Mannheim, Karlsruhe, Ludwigshafen am Rhein, Heidelberg, Kaiserslautern	VRN, KVV, HNV, saarVV	2003	7	603 km	425, Siemens Mireo	DB Regio Südwest	2017, 2033
Rhein-Ruhr S-Bahn (Ruhrschnellverkehr); Cologne S-Bahn	Ruhrgebiet (esp. Duisburg, Essen, Bochum, Dortmund); Rheinland (Cologne, Düsseldorf, Wuppertal, Bonn)	VRR VRS	1967 (1932); 1975	14	717 km	420, 422, 423, 424, Stadler Flirt 3XL, Bombardier Talent, Alstom Coradia LINT, Alstom Coradia Continental, Integral	DB Regio NRW, Regiobahn, Abellio Rail NRW	
Rostock S-Bahn	Rostock	VVW	1974	3	91 km	Bombardier Talent 2	DB Regio Nordost	2024
Stuttgart S-Bahn	Stuttgart, Waiblingen, Esslingen am Neckar, Ludwigsburg, Böblingen	VVS	1978	7	215 km	423, 430	DB Regio AG	2028

=== Italy ===
The Milan S Lines is a network consisting of 12 lines beginning with an S, serving the metropolitan area of Milan. The system comprises 13 lines serving 124 stations, for a total length of 403 km. There are 415 daily trips by the trains with a ridership of about 230,000 per day.

The core of the system is the Passante, an underground railway running through the city approximately from the north-west to the south-east where several services interline.

=== Liechtenstein ===
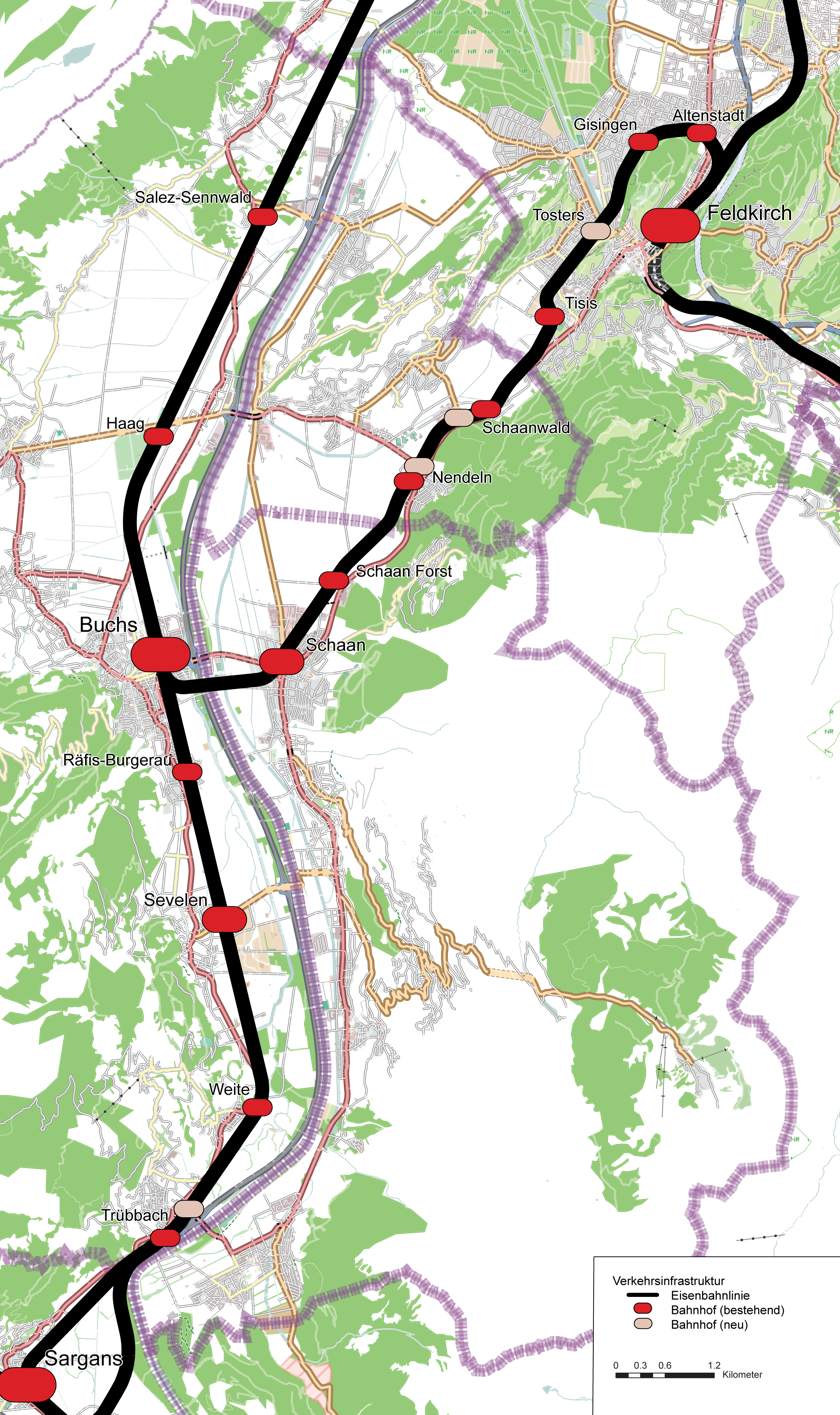
S-Bahn Liechtenstein (currently suspended)

The only railway line passing through the Principality of Liechtenstein is the Feldkirch–Buchs railway line, which connects with the Austrian rail network in Feldkirch and with the Swiss network in Buchs SG. In June 2008, the Swiss canton of St. Gallen, the Austrian state of Vorarlberg, and the Principality of Liechtenstein signed an agreement for a project to upgrade this line (and the surrounding ones) and to increase the rail traffic. The project, named S-Bahn Liechtenstein was approved by Liechtenstein and Austria in a Letter of Intent signed in April 2020 and under that plan, it was to be fully realised by 2027 and would have cost an estimated €187 million. That plan was however rejected by 62.3% of Liechtenstein voters in a referendum on 30 August 2020.

As of the December 2023 timetable change, an S-Bahn service, the S2 of Vorarlberg S-Bahn, operates between Feldkirch (A), Schaan (FL) and Buchs SG (CH). There are three operational railway stations in Liechtenstein along the Feldkirch–Buchs line: Schaan-Vaduz (which serves the capital Vaduz), Forst Hilti and Nendeln. A fourth station, Schaanwald, was closed in 2013.

=== Poland ===
SKM Warsaw logo

Established in 2002, the Rapid Urban Railway functions as a combined rapid transit and commuter rail system within the Warsaw metropolitan area. Operated by the city-owned company Szybka Kolej Miejska Sp. z o.o. and managed by the Public Transport Authority in Warsaw, SKM utilizes shared general railway lines supervised by PKP Polskie Linie Kolejowe. The system serves 55 stations and features 4 key lines - S1, S2, S3, and S4, connecting Warsaw Chopin Airport with the city center, additionally reaching to areas not covered by the metro network.

SKM Tricity logo

The Tricity Rapid Urban Railway is an analogous SKM system serving Gdańsk, Gdynia, and Sopot, providing urban rail transit in the Poland's Tricity.

=== Switzerland ===
S-Bahn is also used in the German-speaking part of Switzerland. Swiss French networks use the term RER with line numbers prefixed with an R, e.g. as R2, except for the Léman Express in Greater Geneva that uses the prefix L followed by the line number ("L" for "Léman-Express"), e.g. L2. S-Bahn-style services in the Italian and Romansh speaking parts of Switzerland also use, like the Milan suburban system, the "S" prefix, although in Italian such networks are called rete celere (lit. 'fast network') instead of S-Bahn.

Berne S-Bahn logo

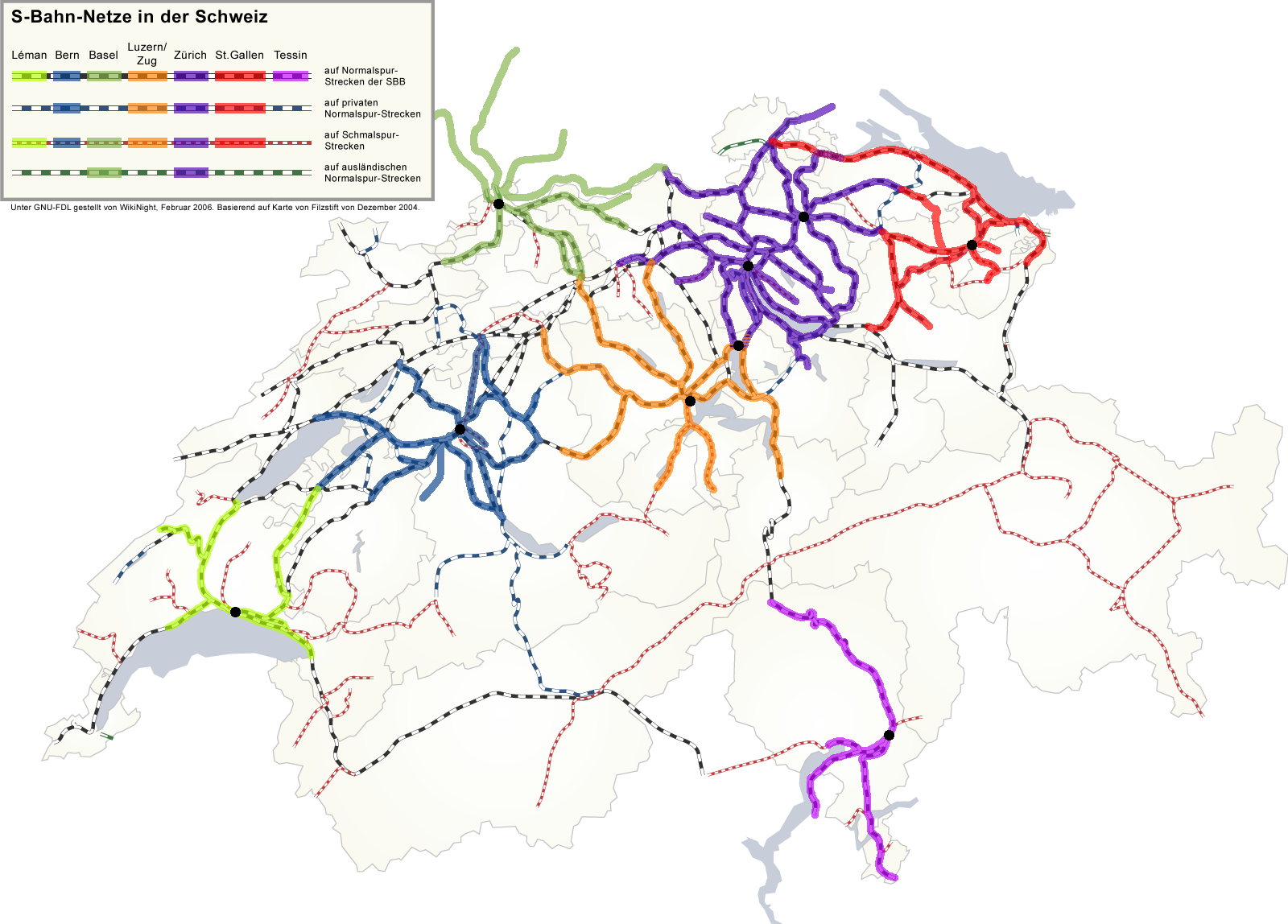
S-Bahn networks of Swiss urban areas (in 2006)

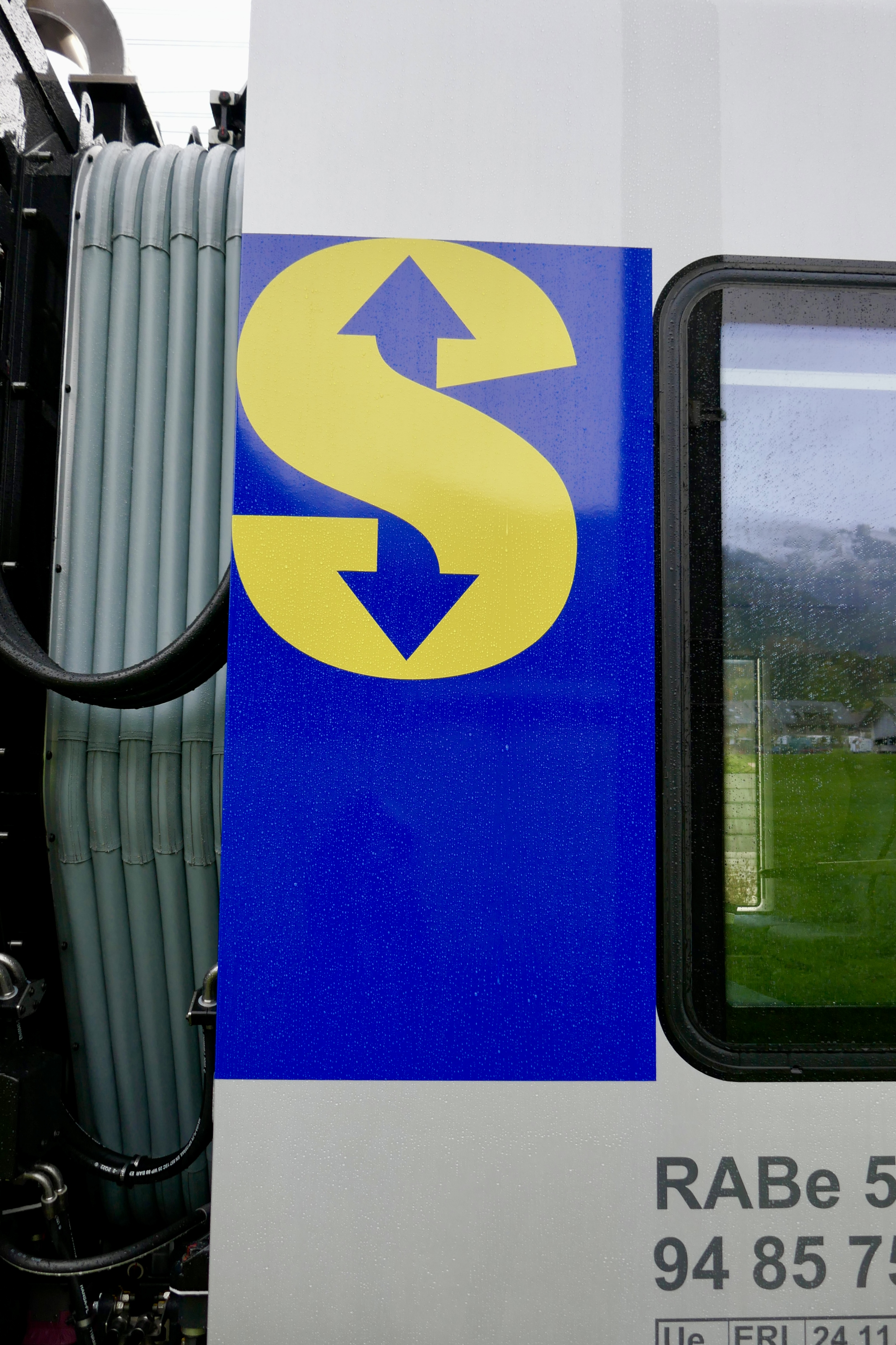
Bern S-Bahn train with logo

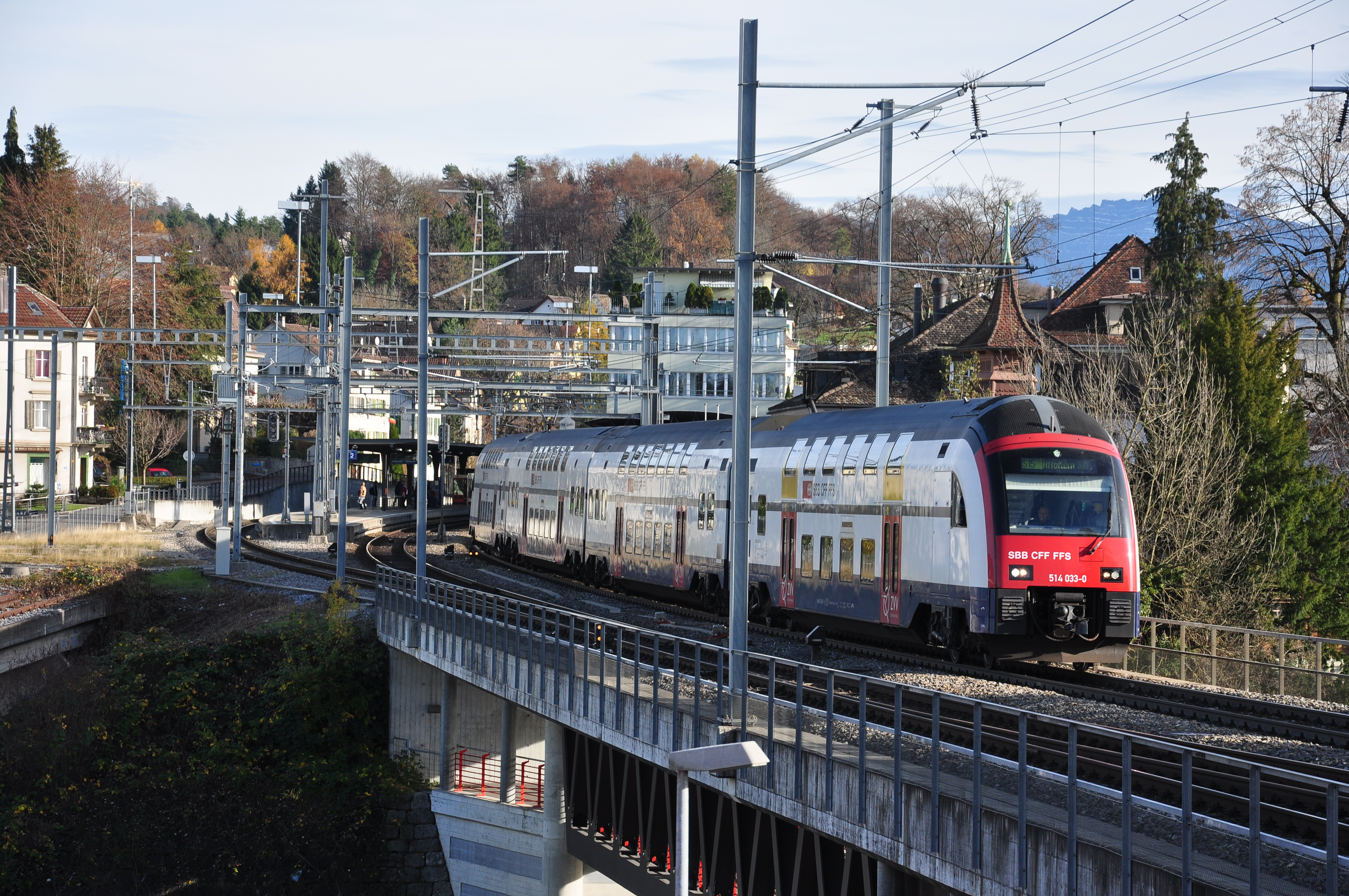
S-Bahn Zurich EMU in Rüti

The oldest network in Switzerland is the Bern S-Bahn, which was established in stages from 1974 onward and has adopted the term S-Bahn since 1995. It is also the only one in Switzerland to use a coloured "S" logo. In 1990, the Zürich S-Bahn, went into service. As of 2022, this network comprises 32 services, covering a large area in Switzerland (and parts of southern Germany). Further S-Bahn services were set up in the course of the Bahn 2000 initiative in Central Switzerland (a collaborative network of S-Bahn Luzern and Stadtbahn Zug), and Eastern Switzerland (S-Bahn St. Gallen).

The Basel trinational S-Bahn services the Basel metropolitan area, thus providing cross-border transportation into both France and Germany. New lines were added to the system in December 2025. A tunnel connecting Basel's two large intercity stations (Basel Badischer Bahnhof and Basel SBB), known as Herzstück Regio-S-Bahn Basel (lit. heart-piece Regio-S-Bahn Basel), is planned for the future.

An international S-Bahn network also existsts across the Swiss-Italian border, in the Swiss Canton of Ticino and the Italian state of Lombardy. Services are operated by Treni Regionali Ticino Lombardia (TILO), a joint venture between Italian railway company Trenord and Swiss Federal Railways (SBB CFF FFS).

The RER Vaud of Lausanne and the Léman Express of Geneva serve the area around Lake Geneva (French: Lac Léman). The Léman express network expands across the Swiss-French border. It is the largest cross-country S-Bahn network of Europe. Léman express was launched with six lines (L1–L6) in December 2019 and is operated by Swiss Federal Railways (SBB CFF FFS) and SNCF. With the 2025 timetable change, a new line (L7) was added.

Another transborder network for the Lake Constance (German: Bodensee) area, connecting up to four nations, is under discussion. This network would extend across the German states Baden-Württemberg and Bavaria, the Austrian state Vorarlberg, the Principality of Liechtenstein (S-Bahn FL.A.CH), and the Swiss cantons of Appenzell Ausserrhoden, Appenzell Innerrhoden, Schaffhausen, St. Gallen and Thurgau. Possible names are Bodensee-S-Bahn and Alpenrhein-Bahn. Presently, the Bodensee S-Bahn only operates services around Lake Constance in Austria, Germany and Switzerland (without Liechtenstein). It includes, among others, the S14 and S44 services of St. Gallen S-Bahn, which both connect Konstanz (D) with Kreuzlingen and Weinfelden (CH). Since 2022, some S7 services continue from Rorschach (CH) to Bregenz (A) and Lindau-Reutin (D). Additional transborder services are planned for the future.

The Chur S-Bahn provides services around Chur, the capital of the alpine Canton of Grisons (Graubünden) in south-eastern Switzerland.

The Aargau S-Bahn is a small network that services stations in the cantons of Aargau, Lucerne and Bern.

The RER Fribourg is a network centered at Fribourg/Freiburg and Bulle in the canton of Fribourg, and extending into the cantons of Neuchâtel and Vaud, which is called S-Bahn in German. As of 2025, the system includes five routes beginning with "S" and two RegioExpress (RE) services.

Two S-Bahn services, one between Schaffhausen and Erzingen (D), running on railway tracks owned by Deutsche Bahn (DB), and one between Schaffhausen and Jestetten (D), opened in 2013. They are operated by SBB GmbH and Thurbo, respectively. Since December 2022, the Schaffhausen–Singen am Hohentwiel line is also serviced by SBB GmbH As of the December 2023 timetable change, the three services of Schaffhausen S-Bahn are numbered S62, S64 and S65 (before the lines were unnumbered, designated only with an "S").

The RER Jura, centered around Porrentruy in the canton of Jura, was launched with the December 2025 timetable change. It consists of four lines (R1, R2, R11, R22).

Additionally, there are services designated "S" that are not part of any formal S-Bahn network. These include the S20, S21, and S22 operated by Swiss Federal Railways in Solothurn or the S27 operated by Südostbahn (SOB) between Siebnen-Wangen and Ziegelbrücke.

Swiss S-Bahn services are operated mostly by the Swiss Federal Railways (SBB CFF FFS) but also by private railway companies, such as Appenzeller Bahnen (AB), BLS AG, Forchbahn (FB), Regionalverkehr Bern-Solothurn (RBS), Rhätische Bahn (RhB), Sihltal Zürich Uetliberg Bahn (SZU), Südostbahn (SOB) or Zentralbahn (ZB).

Rail transport in Switzerland, including S-Bahn systems, is noteworthy for its coordination between services due to the clock-face schedule. Due to the proximity of the various S-Bahn systems in Switzerland, services of one network often offer connections to services of neighboring networks. S-Bahn services are used by commuters and tourists (some services call nearby tourist attractions, such as the Rhine Falls or the Swiss Museum of Transport).

=== United Kingdom ===
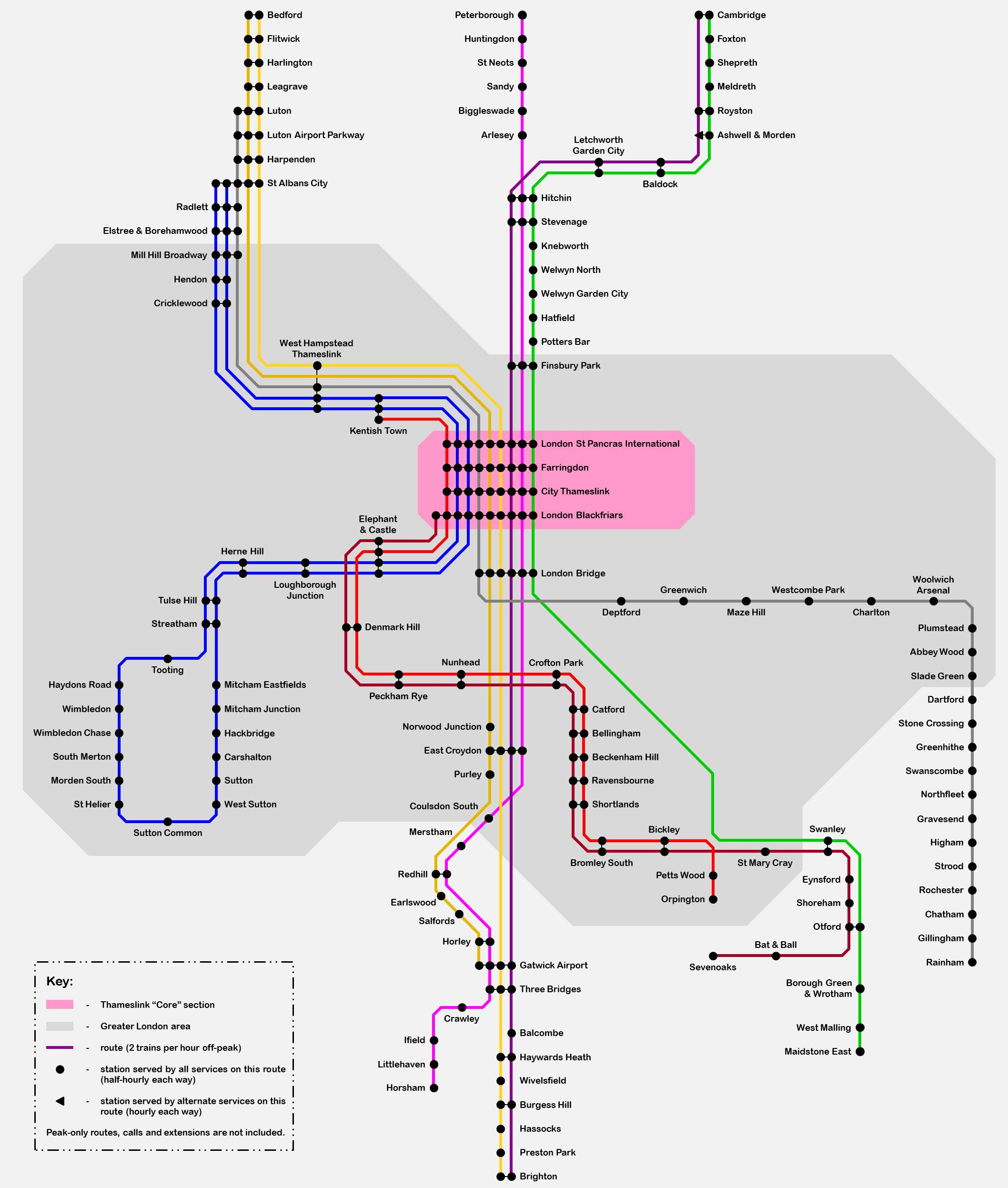
Map of the Thameslink Network

There are two S-Bahn style systems operating in London, the Elizabeth line and Thameslink.

==== Thameslink ====
Thameslink Logo

Thameslink is an S-Bahn style system connecting the north and south of London. It operates at a frequency of 16 trains per hour off-peak and 20 trains per hour on-peak on the core section and services diverge to serve satellite towns and cities such as Luton, Bedford, Cambridge, Horsham and Brighton. It was originally built in 1988 and heavily upgraded in 2018 to increase capacity and begin ATO (Automatic Train Operation).

==== Elizabeth line ====
Map of the Elizabeth line

Thameslink Logo

The Elizabeth line opened in 2022, connecting Reading and Heathrow in the west with Shenfield and Abbey Wood in the east through central London. It operates 16 trains per hour on the central core off-peak. Trains then diverge to serve destinations such as Heathrow Airport, Reading, Shenfield and Abbey Wood. It had already supported more than 150 million journeys in its first year, and TfL later reported 242.9 million customer journeys (about 243 million) in the year ending March 2025.

== See also ==
- Commuter rail
- List of suburban and commuter rail systems
- Train categories in Europe
- U-Bahn
- Urban rail transit
