= Joseph König =

Joseph König may refer to:

- Joseph König (theologian)
- Joseph König (chemist)
