= Singen =

- Town
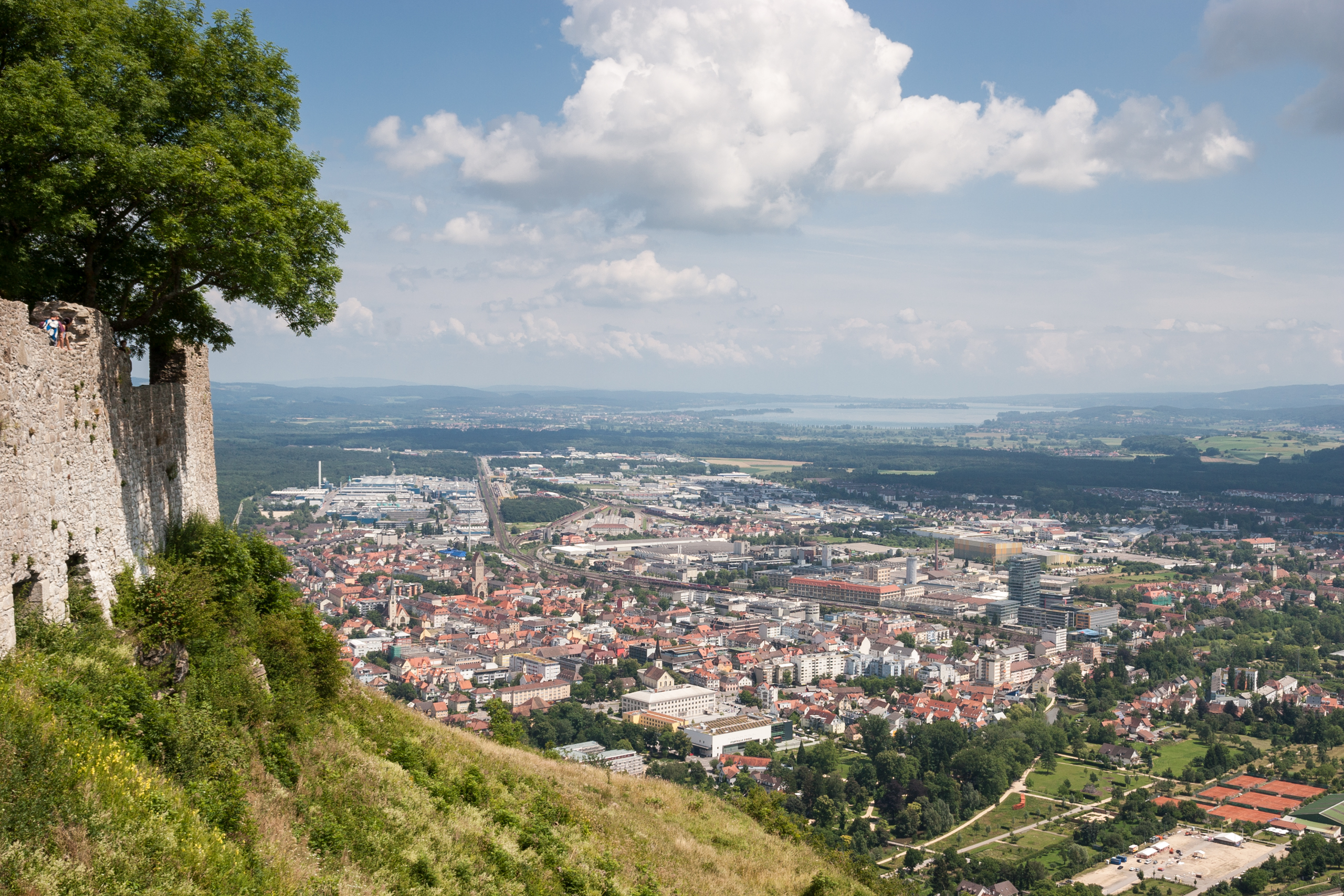
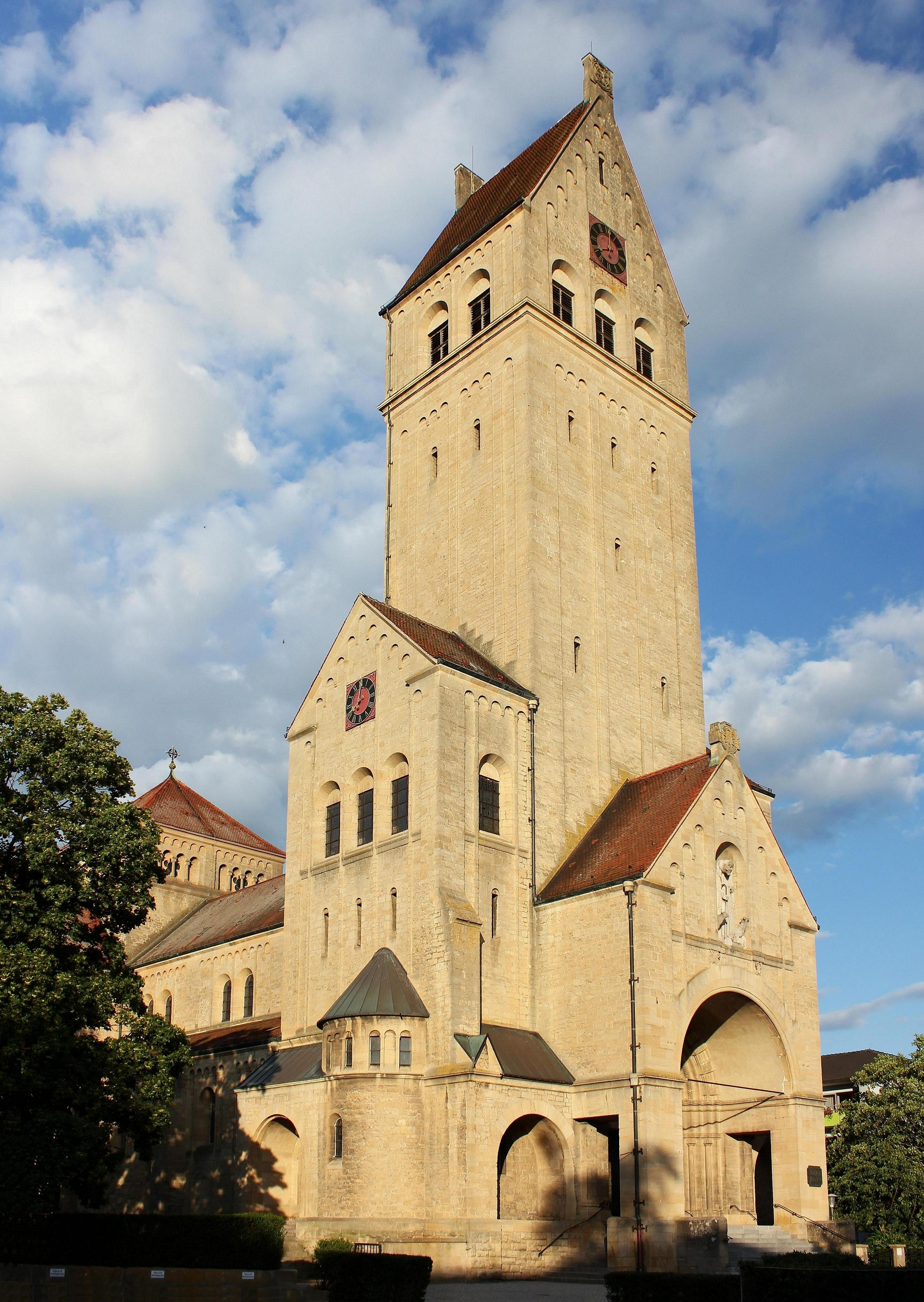
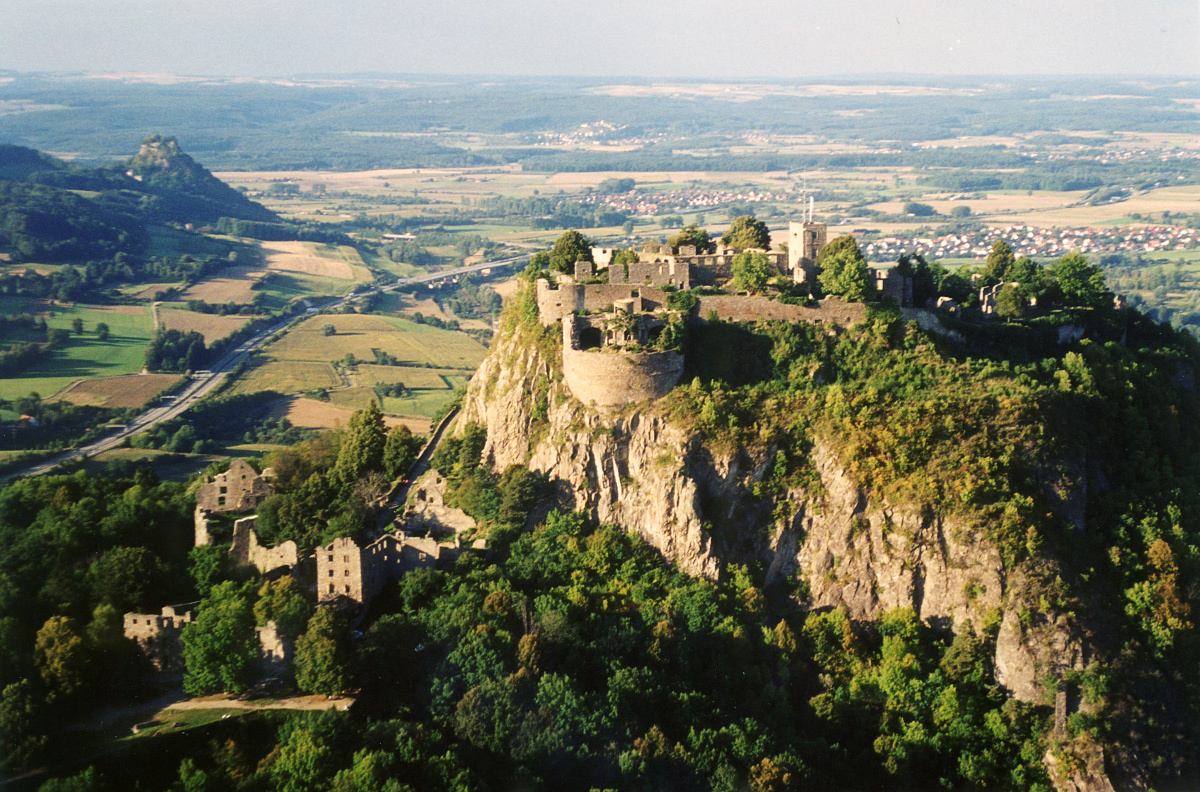
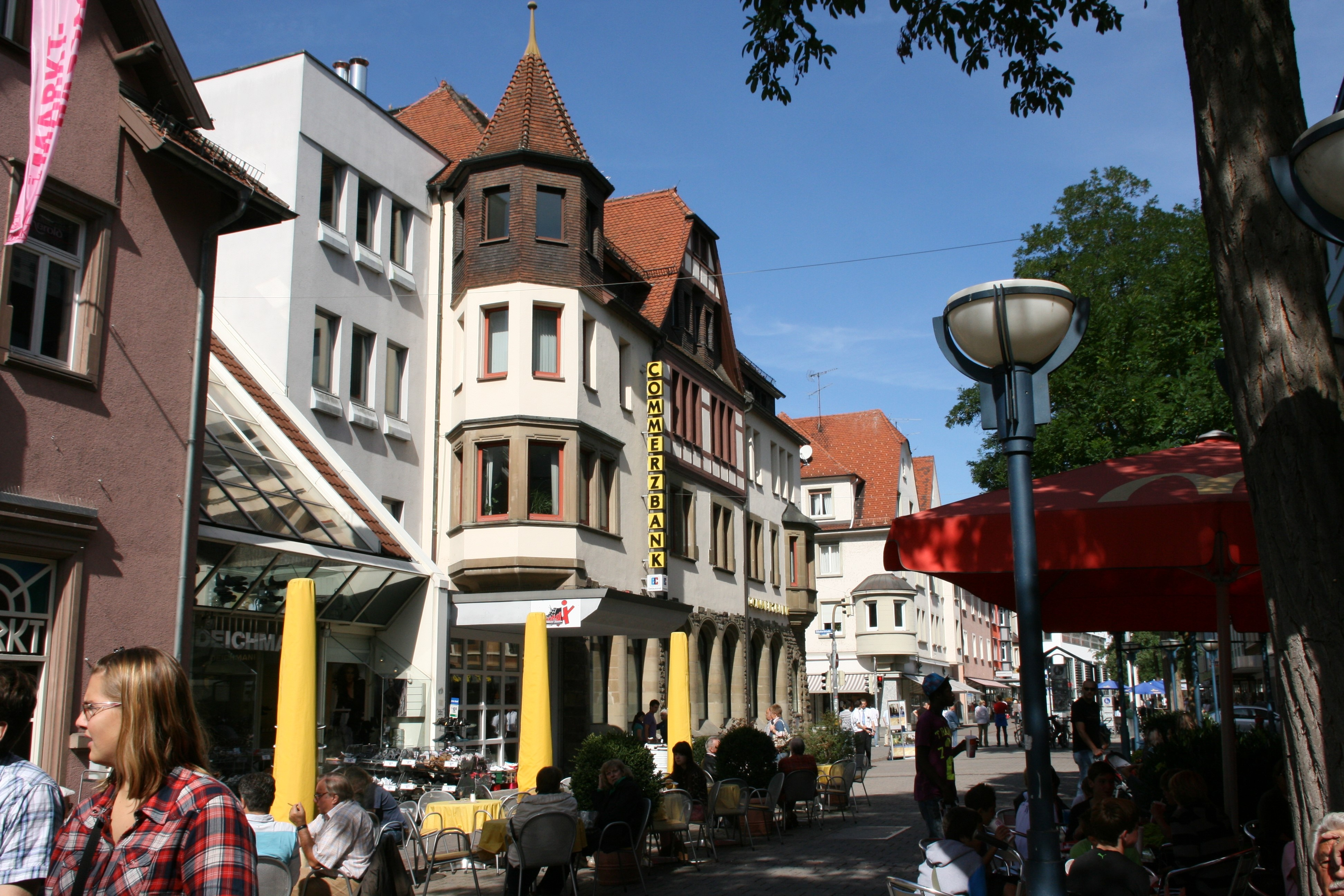
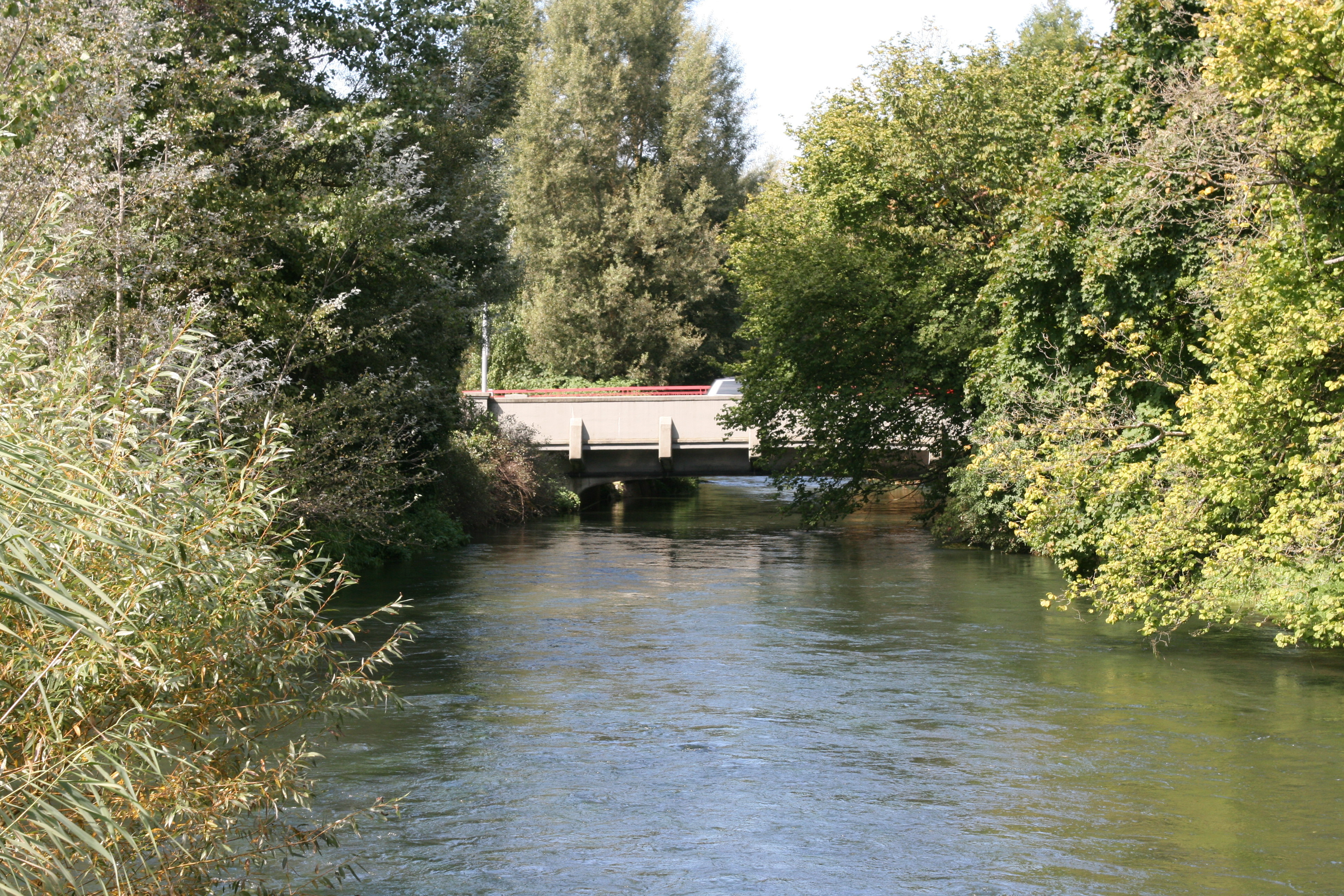
- Clockwise from top: The city seen from Hohentwiel; Hohentwiel Castle; Public park (Stadtgarten) and Radolfzeller Aach; town street; Herz-Jesu church

- Coat of arms
- Interactive map of Singen
- Location within Germany Location within Baden-Württemberg
- Coordinates: 47°45′46″N 8°50′24″E
- Country: Germany
- State: Baden-Württemberg
- Admin. region: Freiburg
- District: Konstanz
- Subdivisions: 7

Government
  - Mayor (2021–29): Bernd Häusler (CDU)

Area
  - Total: 61.77 km^{2} (23.85 sq mi)
- Elevation: 429 m (1,407 ft)

Population (2025-12-31)
  - Total: 48,089
  - Density: 778.5/km^{2} (2,016/sq mi)
- Time zone: UTC+01:00 (CET)
  - Summer (DST): UTC+02:00 (CEST)
- Postal codes: 78224
- Dialling codes: 07731
- Vehicle registration: KN
- Website: www.in-singen.de

Singen (German pronunciation: [ˈzɪŋən]; Low Alemannic: Singe) is an industrial city in the very south of Baden-Württemberg in southern Germany and just north of the German-Swiss border. It lies in the Hegau region near Lake Constance.

== Location ==
Singen is an industrial city situated in the far south of Baden-Württemberg in Germany close to Lake Constance, just north of the German-Swiss border. It is the most important city in the Hegau area.

== Landmarks ==
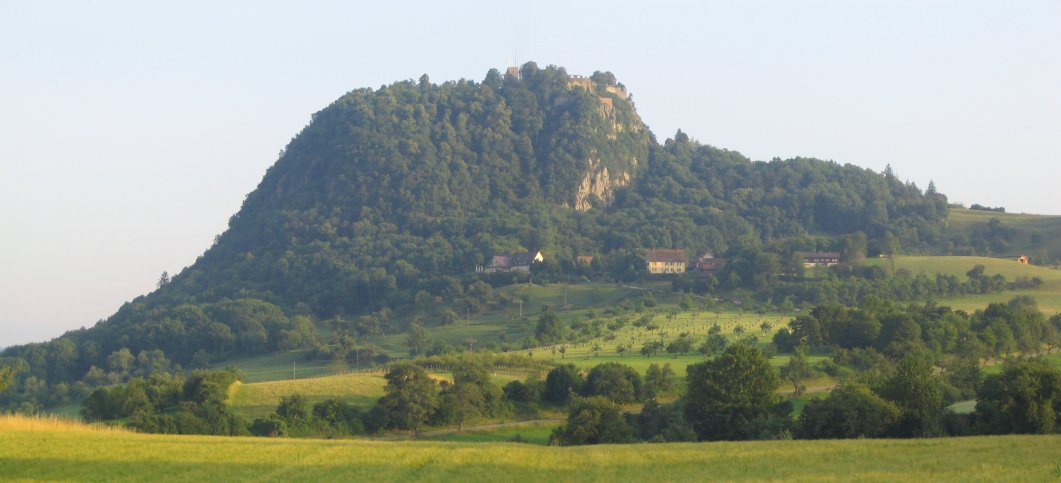
Hohentwiel

The most famous landmark of Singen is Hohentwiel, a volcanic stub on which there are the ruins of a fortress destroyed by French troops during the Napoleonic Wars.

== History ==
=== Early history ===
In the 1950s, a large early Bronze Age burial ground was discovered. This discovery gave its name to the so-called Singen group. It dates from approximately 2300 BC to 2000 BC and was widespread in the area between the Swabian Jura and Lake Constance as well as in Württemberg and Bavarian Swabia. Seven Roman coins date to a period between 341 and 354 AD. A Roman villa has been identified in the suburb of Bohlingen.

=== Middle Ages ===
Singen was first mentioned in documents in 787 as Sisinga. The monastery of St. Gallen, among others, had properties there.

From the 11th century onwards, noblemen were mentioned, who from 1170/80, after their newly built ancestral castle, Hohenfriedingen Castle, called themselves Lords of Friedingen and remained the masters of Singen until 1461.

In 1466 the place passed to the von Fulach family, in 1518 to the von Klingenberg family, and on November 28, 1530 to the von Bodman family, who finally sold it to Austria.

=== Early Modern History ===
In 1571 the Lords of Bodman were the local lords again, then from 1607 the Lords of Reischach and finally Austria again in 1632. They gave Singen to Johann Gaudenz von Rost in 1655, who formed the Singen-Mühlhausen princedom. It was passed through marriage to the Counts of Enzenberg, who built a castle in Singen in the 18th century.

As part of the county of Nellenburg, the village and princedom of Singen belonged to Austria from 1465 to 1805. With the Peace Treaty of Pressburg in 1805, Singen came to district Stockach (in Württemberg) and in 1810 in the border treaty between Württemberg and Baden to the Grand Duchy of Baden. Initially, Singen was a municipality in the Radolfzell district. When it was dissolved in 1872, Singen came to the Konstanz district.

Since the opening of the train station (1863) with the connection to the Baden railway network, Singen developed into an industrial community that expanded significantly, especially after the settlement of Maggi (1887). Therefore, by decree of the Interior Ministry of the Grand Duchy of Baden on September 11, 1899, the municipality of Singen was granted city rights.

=== 20th Century ===
At the beginning of the Nazi dictatorship, the publication of the SPD newspaper “Volkswille”, which was produced in the Thurgauer/Ekkehardstrasse publishing house, was banned in March 1933. The union hall on Schwarzwaldstrasse was confiscated with the ban on unions and the workers' sports clubs that had been active on the Schnaidholz sports field were dissolved. These and other processes of persecution and resistance have been made tangible in a “history trail” since 1989.

A street circuit was constructed in 1991, used by DTM and German Formula Three until 1995.

==== World War II 'Singen route' ====
Singen is notable in military history for the Singen route in World War II. This route into Switzerland was discovered by Dutch naval lieutenant Hans Larive in late 1940 on his first escape attempt from an Oflag (prisoners' camp for officers) in Soest. After being captured at the Swiss border near Singen, the interrogating Gestapo officer was so confident the war would soon be won by Germany that he told Larive the safe way across the border. The officer described how someone could walk to the 'Ramsen salient', where the Swiss border juts into German territory. Larive did not forget and many prisoners later escaped using this route, including Larive himself, Francis Steinmetz, Anthony Luteyn, Airey Neave, Pat Reid and Howard Wardle in their escapes from Colditz Castle when Colditz was used in the war as Oflag IV-C.

== Transport ==
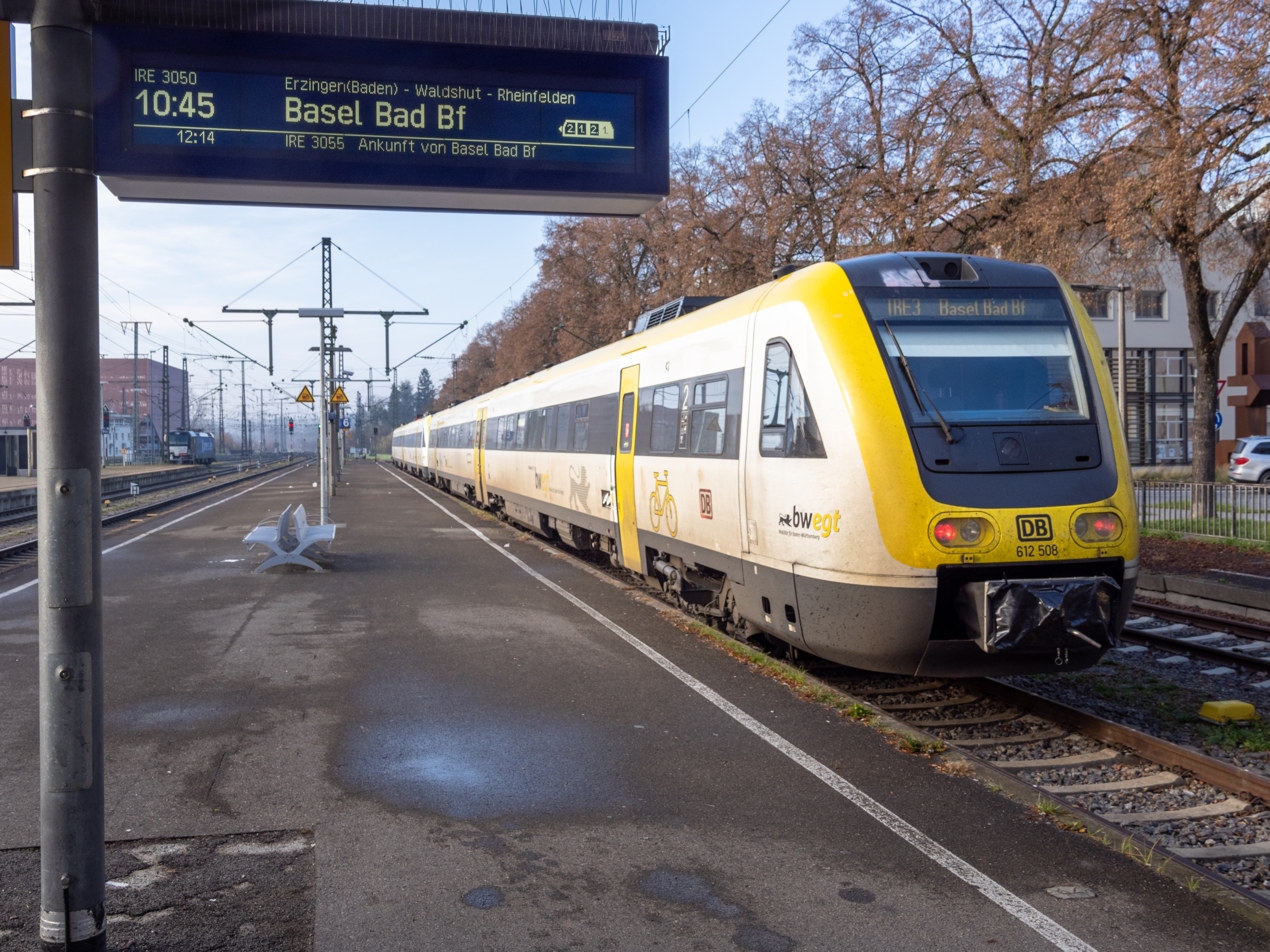
An RE 3 service to Basel Bad Bf at Singen (Hohentwiel) station

Singen (Hohentwiel) is a junction station and important regional train hub. It is the terminus of the Gäu Railway and an intermediate stop on the High Rhine Railway, with direct services to Stuttgart Hbf, Waldshut, Konstanz or Friedrichshafen Stadt and to the Swiss towns of Schaffhausen and Basel. It is also the terminus of the heritage railway to Etzwilen. Between 1913 and 1966, Singen was also the terminus of the now dismantled Randen Railway (Randenbahn) to Beuren-Büßlingen.

The two other railway stations in Singen are Singen-Industriegebiet and Singen-Landesgartenschau; both are served by the Seehas regional train.

The nearest airports are Friedrichshafen Airport, located 69 km (43 mi) and Zurich Airport, located 74 km (46 mi) away from Singen.

== Twin towns – sister cities ==
Singen is twinned with:

- La Ciotat, France (1968)
- Pomezia, Italy (1974)
- Celje, Slovenia (1989)
- Kobeliaky, Ukraine (1993)

== Notable people ==
- Joseph König (1819 at Hausen an der Aach – 1900) a Roman Catholic theologian and Biblical exegete.
- Herbert Haag (1915–2001), Swiss Catholic theologian
- Knut Folkerts (born 1952), former terrorist Red Army Faction, (RAF)
- Beatrix Ruf (born 1960), director and curator of the Kunsthalle Zürich

=== Sport ===
- Reinhard Alber (born 1964), former cyclist, bronze medallist in the team pursuit at the 1984 Summer Olympics
- Annette Klug (born 1969) fencer, gold medallist in the women's team foil at the 1988 Summer Olympics
- Jens Truckenbrod (born 1980), footballer, played almost 500 games
- Aaron Burkart (born 1982), rally driver
- Cédric Soares (born 1991), Portuguese footballer, played over 250 games and 34 for Portugal
