= Böhringen-Rickelshausen station =

Railway station in Radolfzell am Bodensee, Germany

Böhringen-Rickelshausen
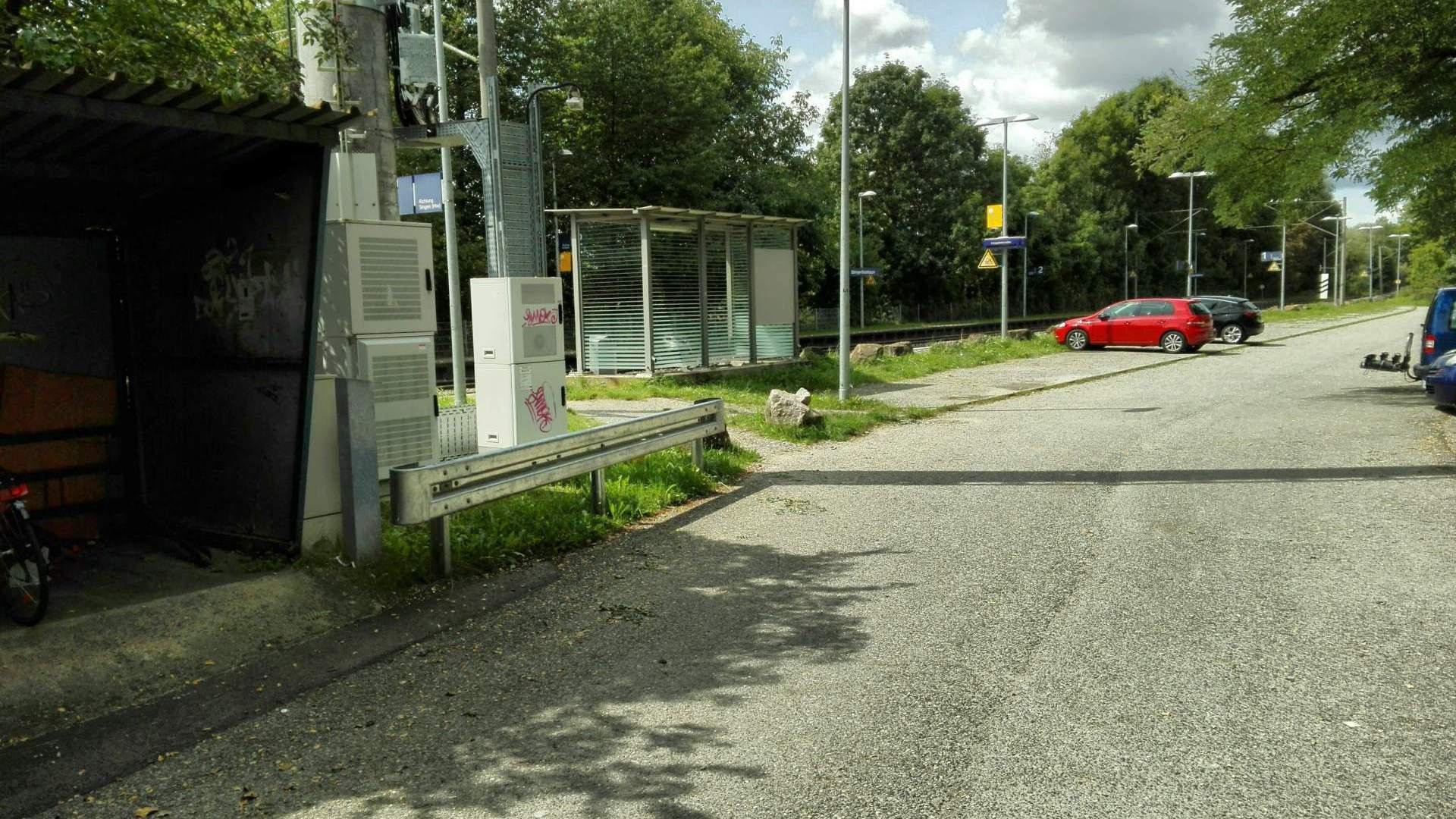
- The station in 2017

General information
- Location: Radolfzell am Bodensee, Baden-Württemberg; Germany
- Coordinates: 47°44′55″N 8°55′36″E
- Owner: DB Netz
- Lines: High Rhine Railway (KBS 720)
- Distance: 390.8 km (242.8 mi) from Mannheim Hauptbahnhof
- Platforms: 2 side platforms
- Tracks: 2
- Train operators: SBB GmbH and DB Regio Baden-Württemberg
- Connections: Südbadenbus and Stadtbus Tuttlingen bus lines

Other information
- Fare zone: 2 and 4 (Verkehrsverbund Hegau-Bodensee)

Services
| Preceding station | DB Regio Baden-Württemberg | Following station |
|---|---|---|
| Singen-Industriegebiet towards Karlsruhe Hbf | RE 2 Limited service | Radolfzell towards Konstanz |
| Preceding station | SBB Deutschland | Following station |
| Singen-Industriegebiet towards Engen | S6 | Radolfzell towards Konstanz |
Location

Böhringen-Rickelshausen station (German: Bahnhof Böhringen-Rickelshausen) is a railway station in the municipality of Radolfzell am Bodensee, in Baden-Württemberg, Germany. It is located on the standard gauge High Rhine Railway of Deutsche Bahn.

== Services ==
As of the December 2020 timetable change, the following services stop at Böhringen-Rickelshausen:

- Seehas S6: half-hourly service between Singen (Hohentwiel) and Konstanz.
- RE 2: some peak time services between Karlsruhe/Villingen and Konstanz.

== See also ==
- Bodensee S-Bahn
- Rail transport in Germany
