= Singen-Industriegebiet station =

Railway station in Singen (Hohentwiel), Germany

Singen-Industriegebiet
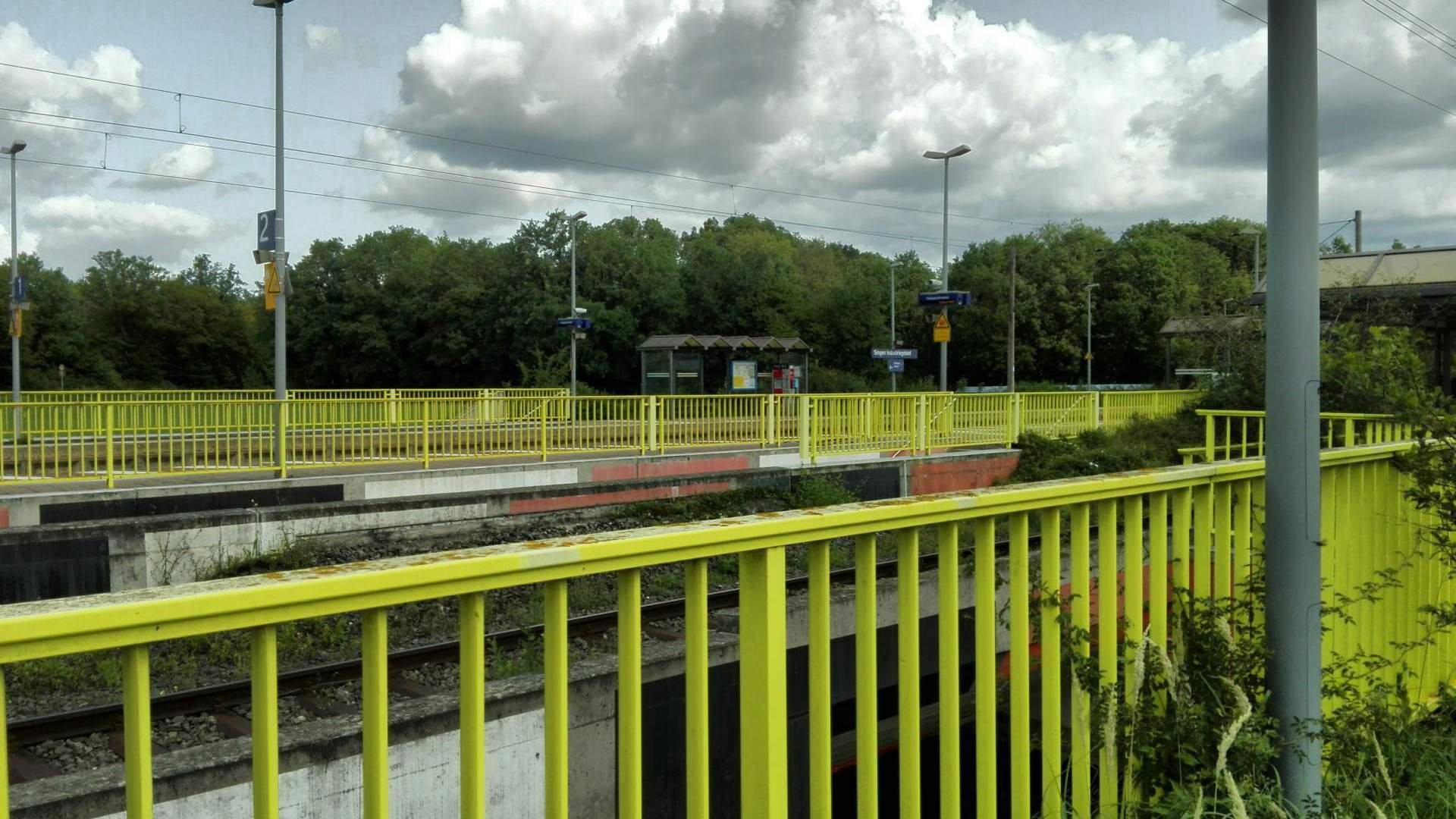
- The station in 2017

General information
- Location: Singen, Baden-Württemberg; Germany
- Coordinates: 47°45′34″N 8°52′20″E
- Owner: DB Netz
- Lines: High Rhine Railway (KBS 720)
- Distance: 386.5 km (240.2 mi) from Mannheim Hauptbahnhof
- Platforms: 2 side platforms
- Tracks: 2
- Train operators: SBB GmbH
- Connections: Stadtwerke Singen and Stadtbus Tuttlingen bus lines

Other information
- Fare zone: 2 (Verkehrsverbund Hegau-Bodensee)

Services
Preceding station	DB Regio Baden-Württemberg	Following station
Singen (Hohentwiel) towards Karlsruhe Hbf	RE 2 Limited service	Böhringen-Rickelshausen towards Konstanz
Preceding station	SBB Deutschland	Following station
Singen (Hohentwiel) towards Engen	S6	Böhringen-Rickelshausen towards Konstanz
Location
- Location within Baden-Württemberg Location within Germany

Singen-Industriegebiet station (German: Bahnhof Singen-Industriegebiet) is a railway station in the municipality of Singen, in Baden-Württemberg, Germany. It is located on the standard gauge High Rhine Railway of Deutsche Bahn.

== Services ==
As of the December 2020 timetable change, the following services stop at Singen-Industriegebiet:

- Seehas S6: half-hourly service between Engen and Konstanz.
- RE 2: some peak time services between Karlsruhe/Villingen and Konstanz.

== See also ==
- Bodensee S-Bahn
- Rail transport in Germany
