= Trunk line 2 (Munich S-Bahn) =

Planned railway tunnel in Munich, Germany

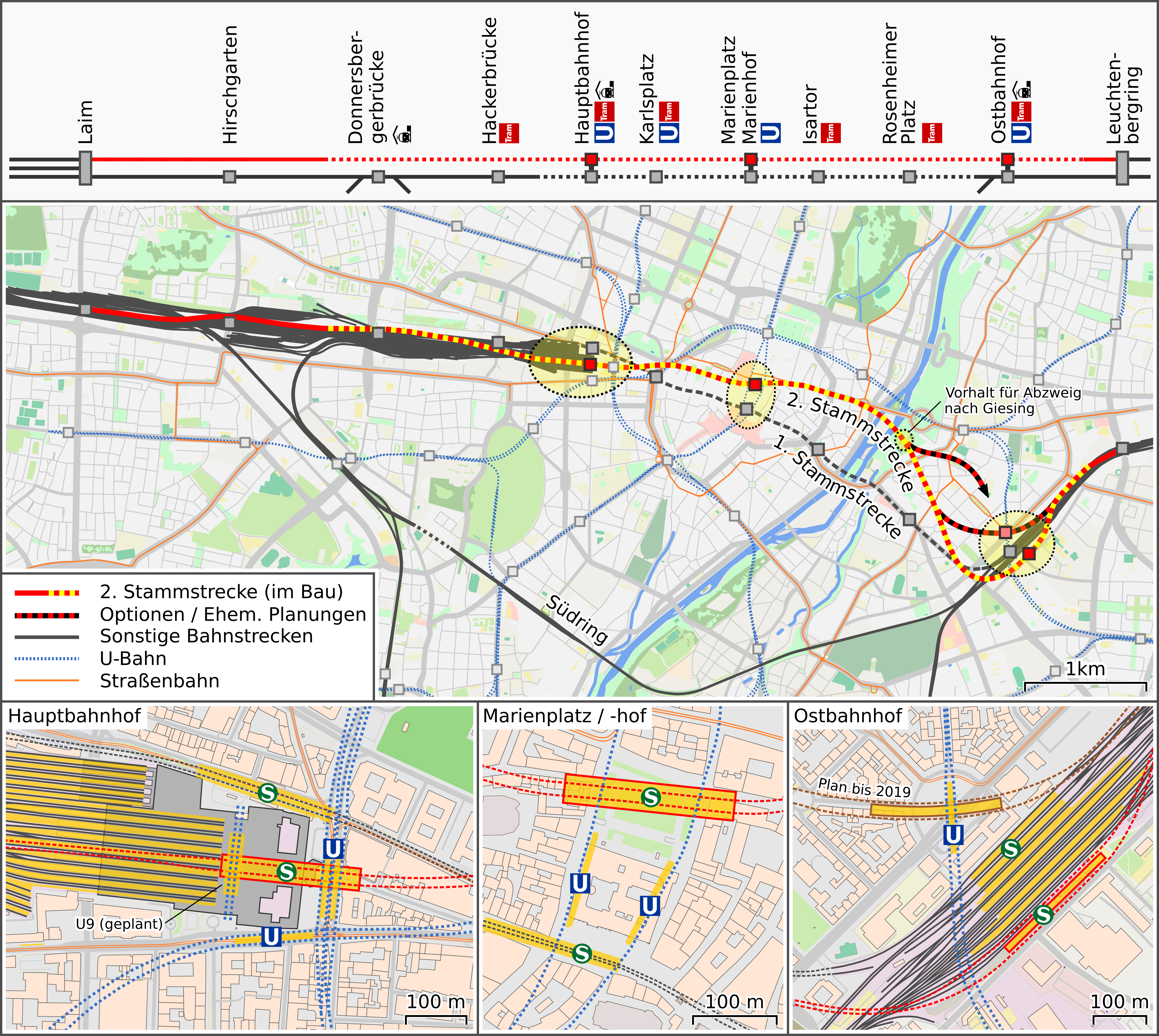

Overview
- Owner: DB Netz
- Locale: Munich, Bavaria, Germany
- Website: www.2.stammstrecke-muenchen.de

History
- Planned opening: 2028

Technical
- Electrification: 15 kV/16.7 Hz AC overhead catenary

Trunk Line 2 (German: Zweite Stammstrecke, lit. 'Second Trunk Line') is an under-construction double track commuter rail tunnel in the Bavarian capital of Munich, Germany.

== Background ==
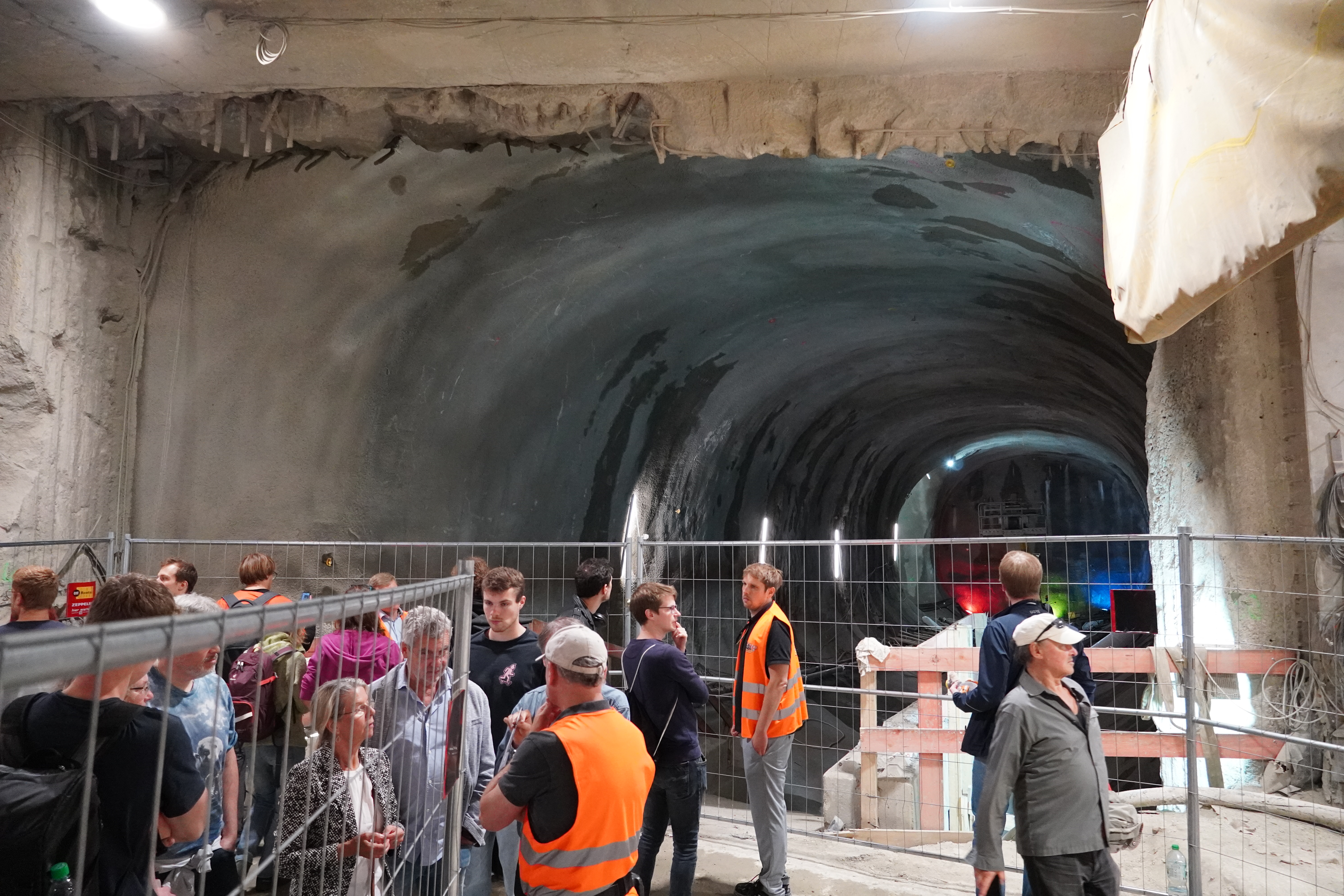
A tunnel that will connect the subway with the S-Bahn, visited on the Day of the open Construction site in 2025

Route map of the future network.

Nearly all lines of the Munich S-Bahn use the Stammstrecke through the city centre in the underground, creating a bottle-neck responsible for long and, consequently, increasingly frequent delays from even the smallest disruptions. The route has been upgraded to its limits to enable shorter headways including by implementing the Spanish solution at busy stations, automatically opening all doors as soon as the train stops (as opposed to the more usual opening of train doors only when a button is pushed) and upgrading signaling. The disadvantage of the current core route is the inability of trains to reroute themselves onto different tracks in the event of disruption.

After years of discussions and studies into different route propositions, a second tunnel through the city centre has been already approved with the funding of €3.85 billion and the completion date of 2026. On 5 April 2017, the ground-breaking ceremony took place to commence the construction.

The second tunnel will be 11.9 kilometres (7.4 miles) in length and run in parallel with the current tunnel in the south on the western portion of Hauptbahnhof and in the north on the eastern portion. It will have three underground stations (Hauptbahnhof, Marienhof, Ostbahnhof), and two surface stations (Laim and Leuchtenbergring). Marienhof, under construction to the north of Marienplatz, will be the only all-new station; other stations will be expanded to accommodate the new tunnel. With focus on express service and shorter travel time, the second tunnel will bypass six current stations between Laim and Ostbahnhof.

Most express S-Bahn lines with limited stops will use the second tunnel: the proposed express S-Bahn routes are S18X (Herrsching-Leuchtenbergring), S21X (Landshut-Leuchtenbergring), S23X (Mering-Flughafen München), and S24X (Buchloe-Leuchtenbergring). Two current S-Bahn routes will be transferred to the second tunnel upon the completion: S1 (Flughafen München/Freising-Ebersberg) and S6 (Tutzing-Leuchtenbergring).
