= Stammstrecke (Munich S-Bahn) =

Munich S-Bahn trunk line

Overview
- Line number: 5540 (Pasing–Hauptbahnhof); 5550 (Hauptbahnhof–Ostbahnhof)
- Locale: Bavaria, Germany

Service
- Route number: 999

Technical
- Line length: 11.4 km (7.1 mi)
- Electrification: 15 kV/16.7 Hz AC overhead catenary
- Operating speed: 120 km/h (75 mph) (maximum)
- Maximum incline: 4.0

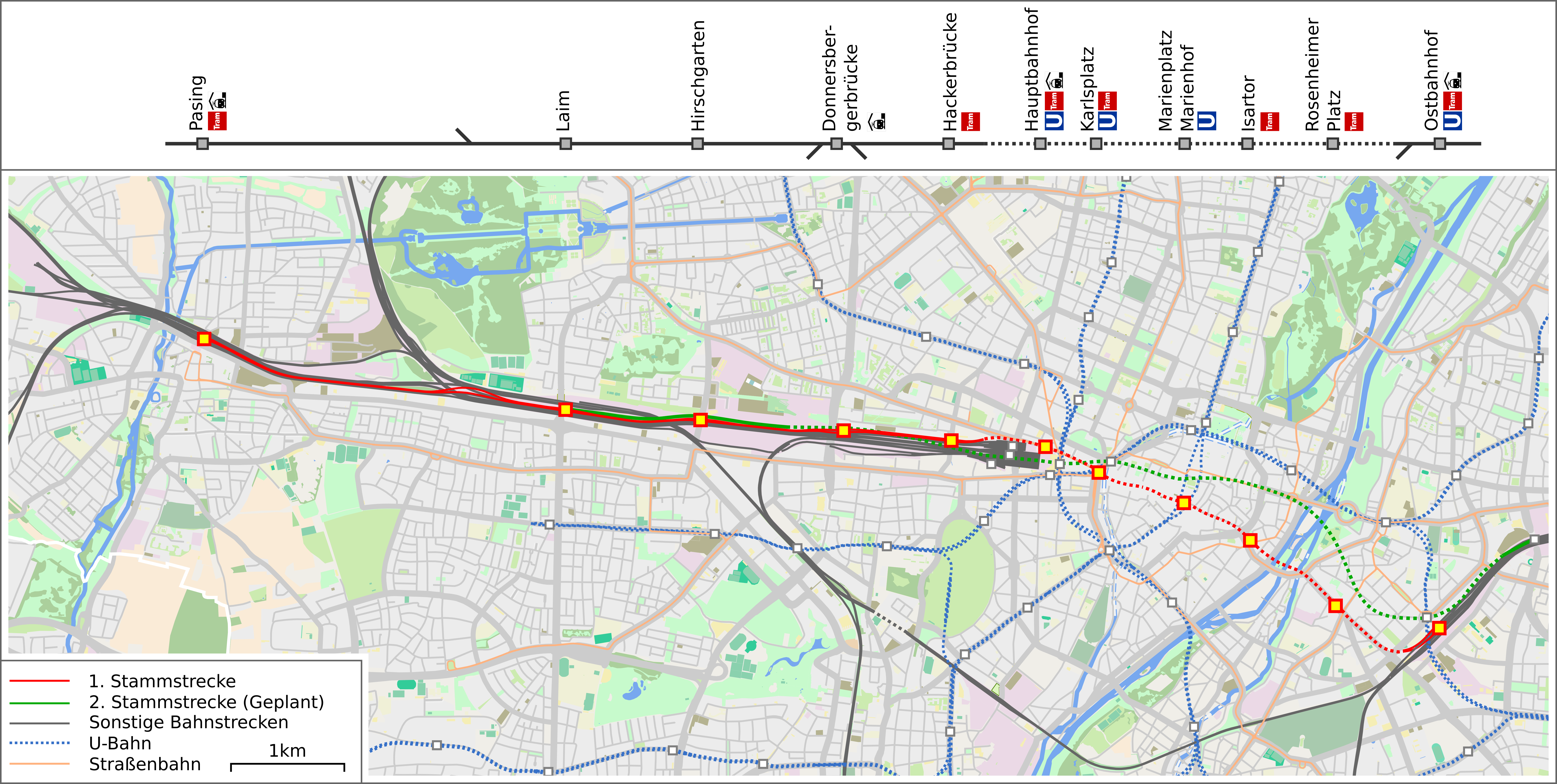

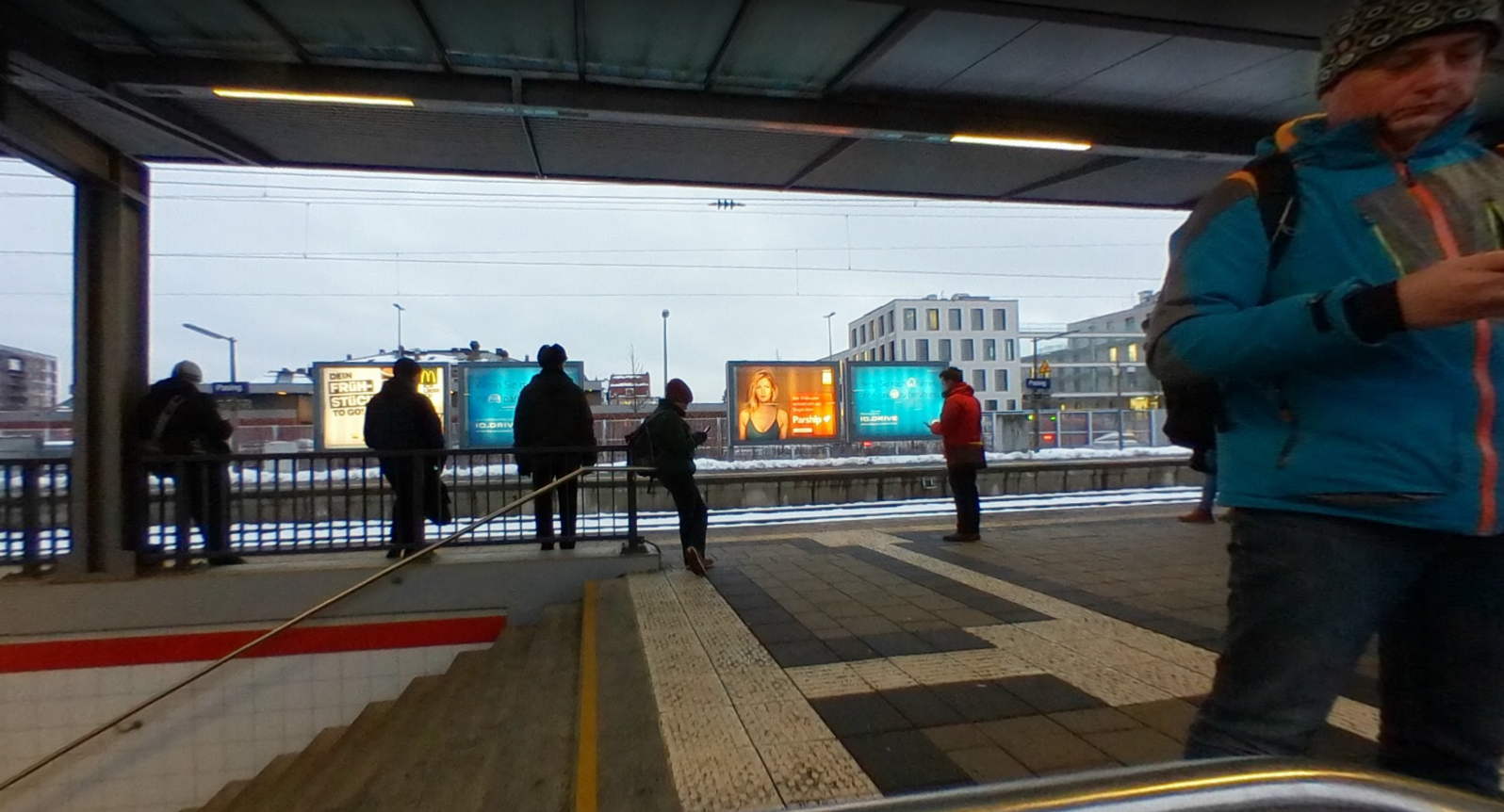
Stammstrecke (Munich S-Bahn) is an underground subway in Bavaria, Germany.

The Munich S-Bahn Stammstrecke is an 11.4-kilometre-long (7.1 mi) portion of the Munich S-Bahn, serving as its core segment where all services meet, running from Munich Pasing station to Munich East station, partly running in a double-track 4.343 km (2.699 mi) rail tunnel connecting München Hauptbahnhof with Munich East station underneath the Altstadt-Lehel and Au-Haidhausen boroughs.

== Background ==
An underground railway line for Munich was first proposed in 1928 in a report on the "relocation of traffic centres". An underground route would allow "direct long distance traffic to and through the city centre".

On 22 May 1938, the first tunnel, which was part of the north–south route, was started in the Lindwurmstraße, between the present-day underground stations Sendlinger Tor and Goetheplatz. In the speech of Julius Dorpmüller, the general director of Deutsche Reichsbahn, the project was called "S-Bahn" for the first time. Due to World War II the construction and plans for the Munich S-Bahn were set aside.

In 1965, the Federal Republic of Germany, the Free State of Bavaria, the state capital of Munich and the Deutsche Bundesbahn signed a contract on the construction of the Munich S-Bahn. The further development was most influenced by a decision made in Rome on 26 April 1966: the International Olympic Committee chose Munich over Detroit, Madrid and Montreal as the location for the 1972 Summer Olympics, resulting in a tight schedule of only six years to complete the Munich S-Bahn network.

On 25 February 1971 the topping-out ceremony could be celebrated in the core route tunnel. In May the first S-Bahn train of the ET 420 series was put into service on the route between Pasing and Gauting. On 1 September 1971 a regular advance service was started on that route.

== Opening ==
On 28 May 1972, the Munich S-Bahn network was finally put into service with 360 kilometres (220 mi) of tracks and 101 trains of the ET 420 series. Town names in the nearby Munich such as Dachau, Tutzing, Erding and Pasing came into the picture. It was the first time a S-Bahn network that size was put into service on a single date. The route S10 to Wolfratshausen (today S7) was operated with conventional push-pull trains from the southern wing of Munich Central Station. It was electrified later and connected to the core route after the construction of a 260-metre (850 ft) tunnel crossing the large number of mainline rail tracks leading to Munich Central Station.

Three months later the German President Gustav Heinemann opened the 1972 Summer Olympics. During the Games there were two additional S-Bahn lines servicing the now-defunct station Olympiastadion (Olympic Stadium). The new S-Bahn system stood the test and transported 3.18 million passengers in 7,138 runs to and from the sports sites in only 17 days.

== Future ==
Due to the overloading of the Stammstrecke, Trunk line 2 is under construction and due to open in 2035.
