= Joseph König (theologian) =

German Roman Catholic theologian and Biblical exegete

Joseph König (7 September 1819, at Hausen an der Aach, Grand Duchy of Baden – 22 June 1900, at Freiburg im Breisgau) was a German Roman Catholic theologian and Biblical exegete.

== Life ==
He was ordained to the priesthood in 1845. In 1847 König was privatdozent, in 1854 extraordinary, and from 1857 to 1894 ordinary, professor of Old Testament literature and exegesis at the University of Freiburg. On the expiration of this term he resigned his professorship.

== Works ==
König's exegetical writings include:

- Die Unsterblichkeitsidee im Buche Job (1855)
- Die Theologie der Psalmen (1857)
- Das alttest. Königtum (programme, 1863)
- Alter u. Entstehung des Pentateuchs (pro-rectoral discourse, 1884)

The editorship of the Freiburger Diözesan-Archiv was entrusted to König, and his period as editor saw many contributions to the history of the major abbeys at Reichenau, St. Gall, and Fulda, several of which were from his own pen. He was known for research work in diocesan history, but it is chiefly in connection with the University of Freiburg, to the history of which institution König contributed many notable studies (see e g. Freiburger Diözesan-Archiv, XXI and XXII), that he is remembered. During the years 1885 to 1889 König's activity centred on the "Necrologium Frib.", a record of the period 1827-87.
