= Outline of Liechtenstein =

Landlocked country in Western Europe

The flag of Liechtenstein

The Coat of arms of the Princely House of Liechtenstein

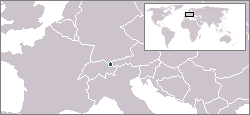
The location of Liechtenstein

An enlargeable map of the Principality of Liechtenstein

The following outline is provided as an overview of and topical guide to Liechtenstein:

Liechtenstein is a tiny, doubly landlocked alpine country located in Western Europe, bordered by Switzerland to its west and by Austria to its east. Mountainous, it is a winter-sport destination. It is also a tax haven. Despite this, it is not heavily urbanised. Many cultivated fields and small farms characterise its landscape both in the north (Unterland) and in the south (Oberland). It is the smallest German-speaking country in the world.

== General reference ==
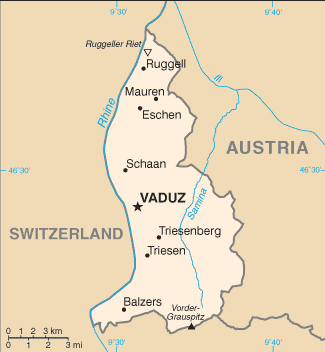
An enlargeable basic map of Liechtenstein

- Pronunciation:
- Common English country name: Liechtenstein
- Official English country name: The Principality of Liechtenstein
- Common endonym(s):
- Official endonym(s):
- Adjectival(s): Liechtenstein
- Demonym(s): Liechtensteiner
- Etymology: Name of Liechtenstein
- ISO country codes: LI, LIE, 438
- ISO region codes: See ISO 3166-2:LI
- Internet country code top-level domain: .li

== Geography of Liechtenstein ==
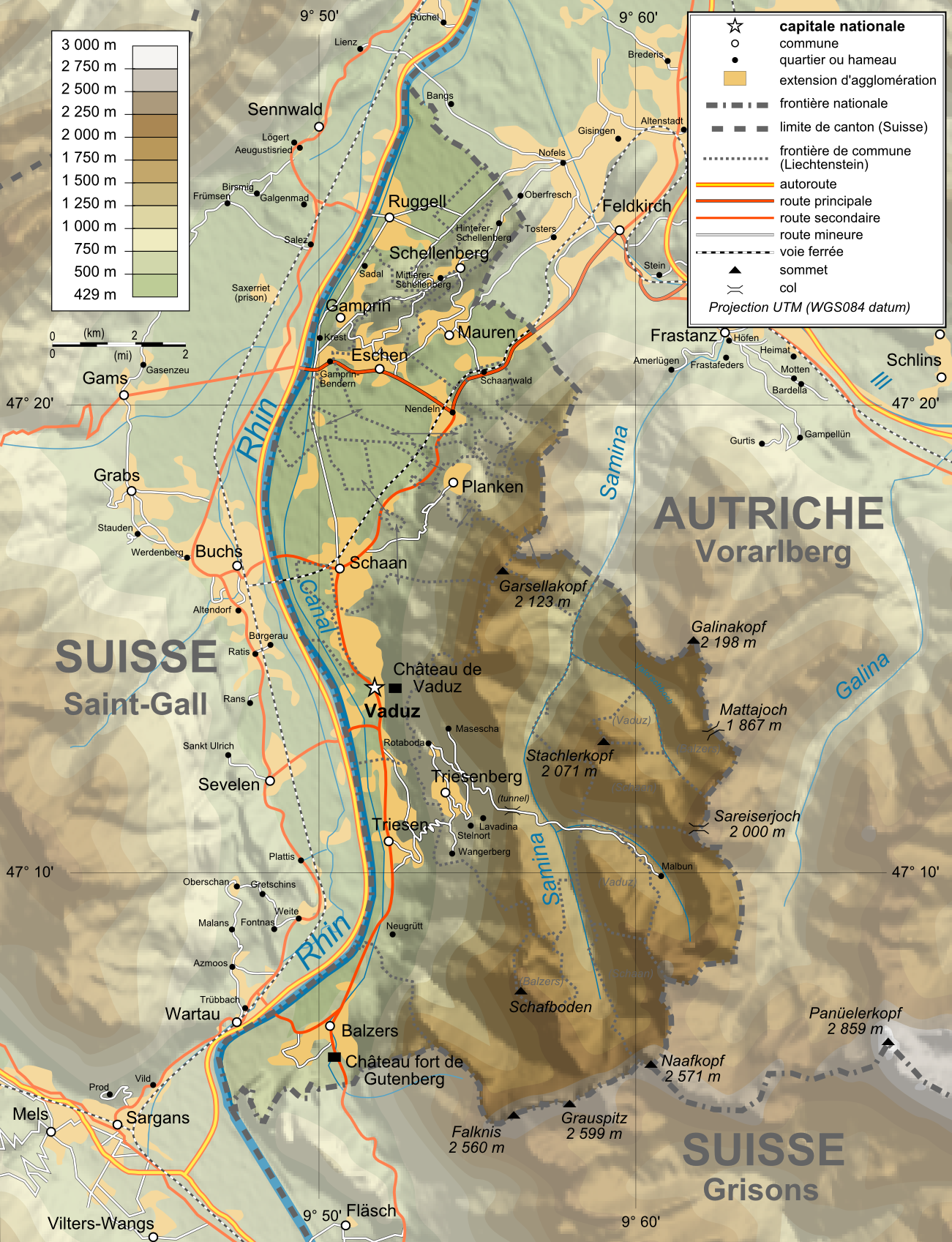
An enlargeable topographic map of Liechtenstein

Geography of Liechtenstein

- Liechtenstein is...
  - a country
    - an alpine country
    - a landlocked country
      - a doubly landlocked country
    - a sovereign state
      - a microstate
        - a European microstate
  - a landlocked country and a European microstate
- Location:
  - Northern Hemisphere and Eastern Hemisphere
  - Eurasia
    - Europe
      - Central Europe
      - Western Europe
  - Time zone: Central European Time (UTC+01), Central European Summer Time (UTC+02)
  - Extreme points of Liechtenstein
    - High: Grauspitz 2,599 m (8,527 ft)
    - Low: Rhine 430 m (1,411 ft)
  - Land boundaries: 76 km

Switzerland 41 km
Austria 35 km

- Coastline: none (Note: Liechtenstein and Uzbekistan are the only two doubly landlocked countries.)

- Population of Liechtenstein: 35,365 (31 December 2007) – 204th most populous country
- Area of Liechtenstein: 160 km^{2}
- Atlas of Liechtenstein

=== Environment of Liechtenstein ===
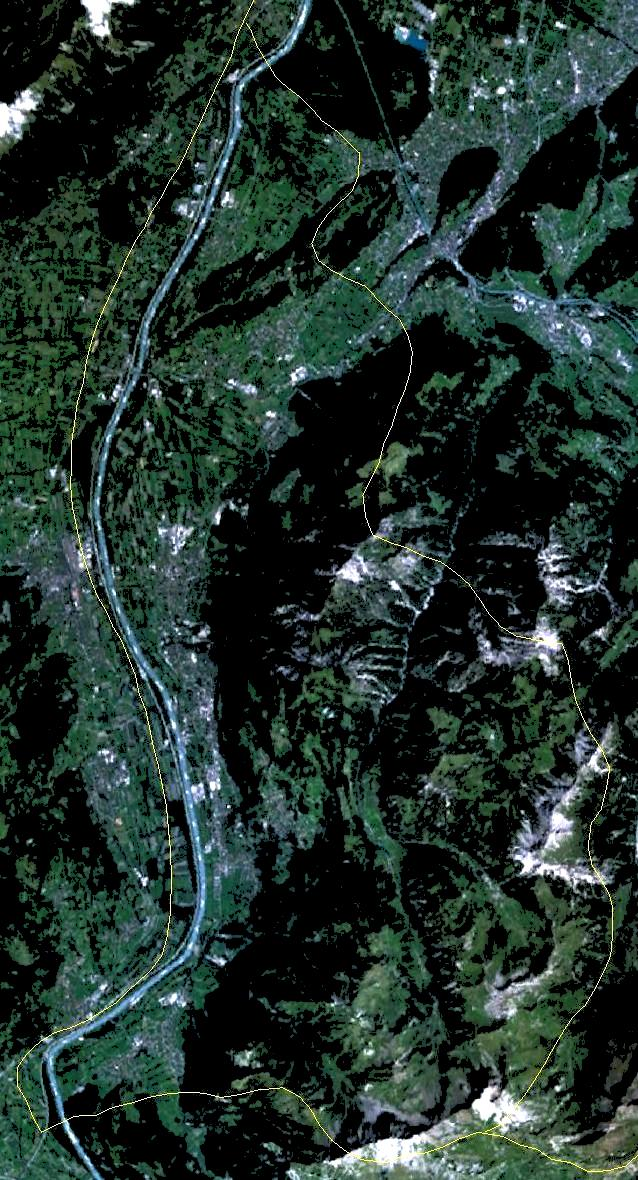
An enlargeable satellite image of Liechtenstein

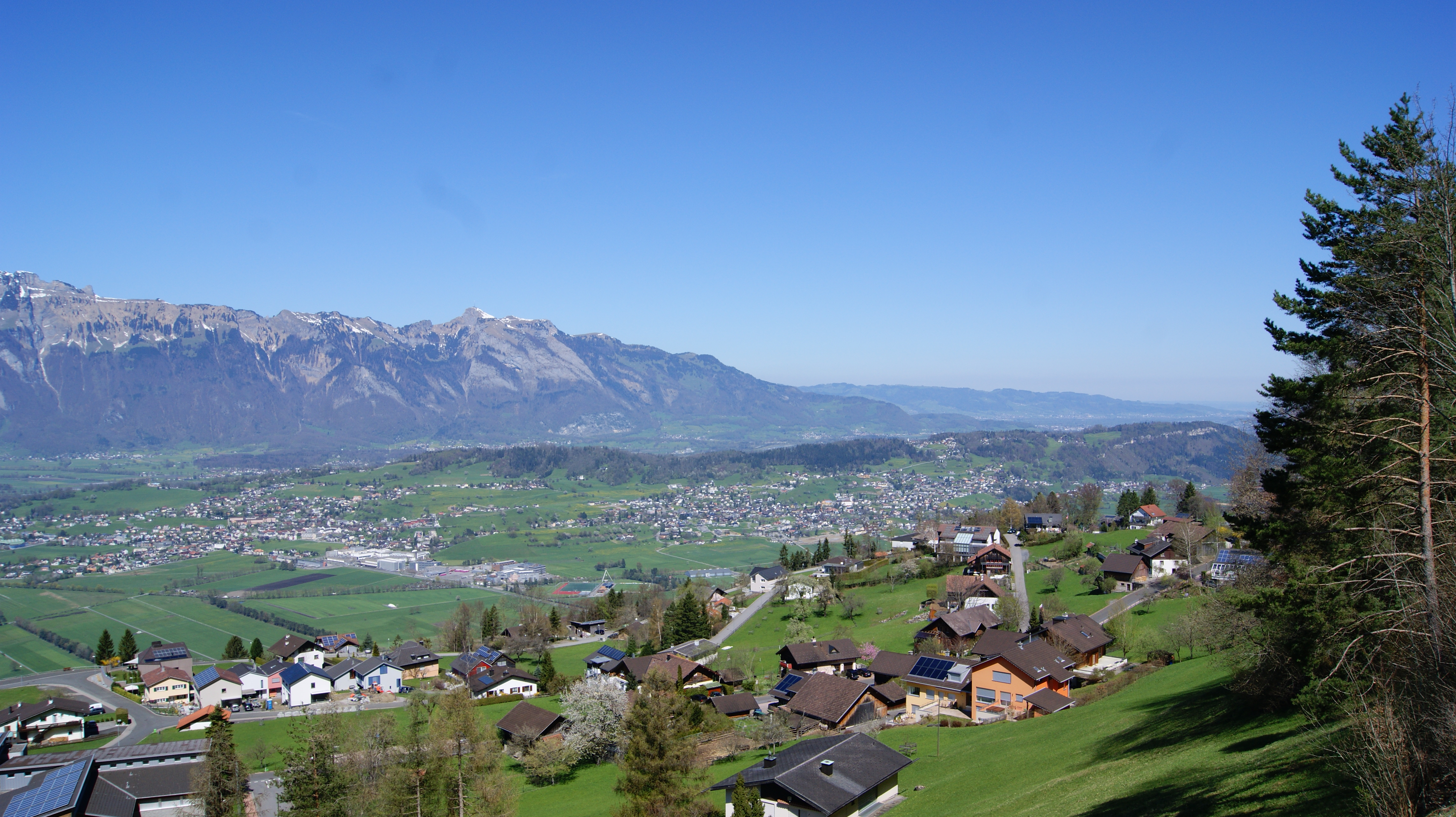
View of Planken, Schellenberg and Mauren

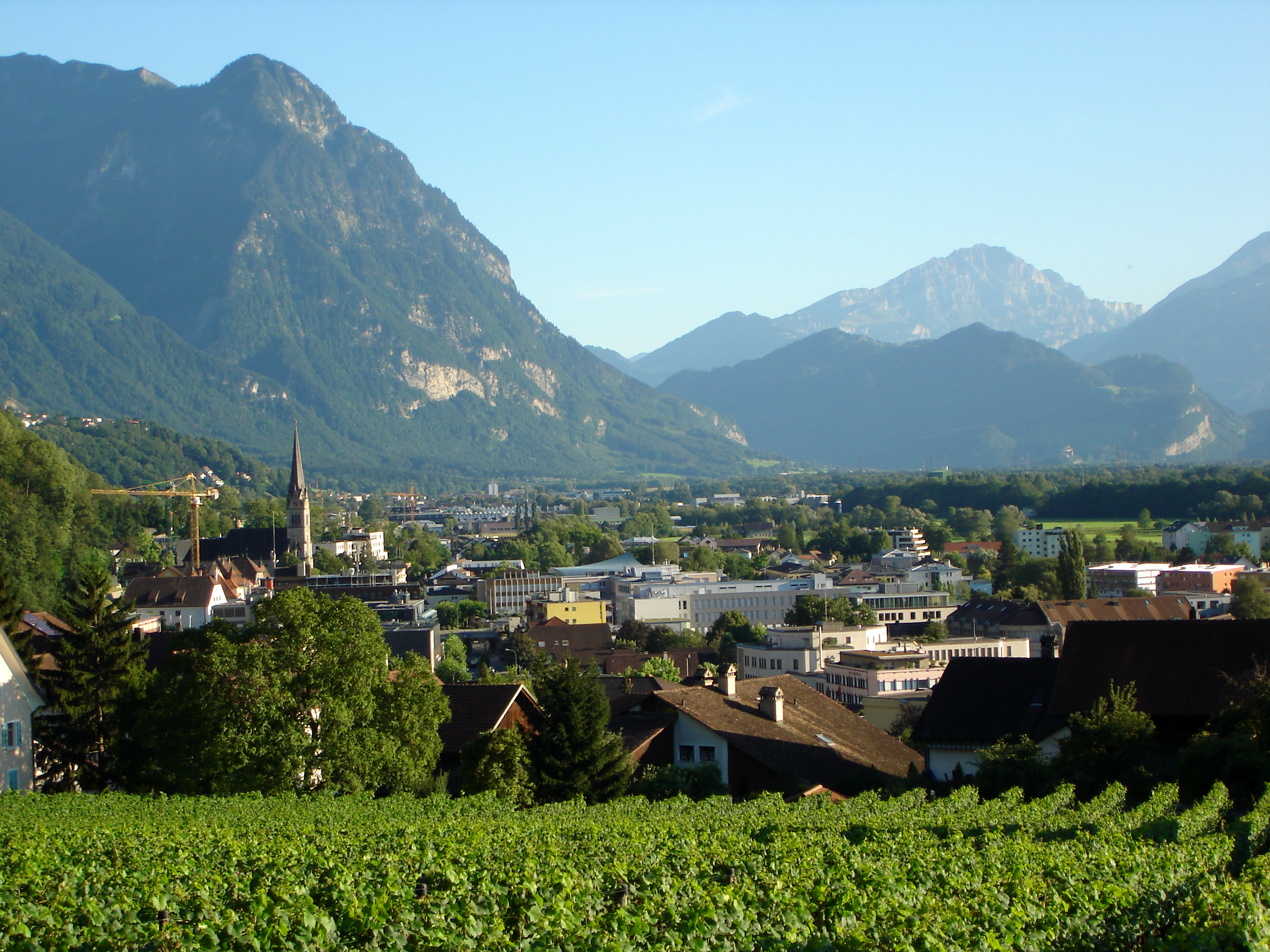
Overlooking Vaduz

- Climate of Liechtenstein
- Renewable energy in Liechtenstein
- Geology of Liechtenstein
- Protected areas of Liechtenstein
  - Biosphere reserves in Liechtenstein
  - National parks of Liechtenstein
- Wildlife of Liechtenstein
  - Fauna of Liechtenstein
    - Birds of Liechtenstein
    - Mammals of Liechtenstein

==== Natural geographic features of Liechtenstein ====
- Glacial alpine valley
  - Alpine Rhine
- Mountains of Liechtenstein
- Rivers of Liechtenstein
- Eschnerberg
- World Heritage Sites in Liechtenstein: None

=== Demography of Liechtenstein ===
Demographics of Liechtenstein

=== Regions of Liechtenstein ===
Regions of Liechtenstein

==== Ecoregions of Liechtenstein ====
List of ecoregions in Liechtenstein

- Ecoregions in Liechtenstein

==== Administrative divisions of Liechtenstein ====
Administrative divisions of Liechtenstein

- Municipalities of Liechtenstein
- Capital of Liechtenstein: Vaduz
- Cities of Liechtenstein

== Government and politics of Liechtenstein ==
Politics of Liechtenstein

- Form of government: parliamentary representative democratic monarchy
- Capital of Liechtenstein: Vaduz
- Elections in Liechtenstein
- Political parties in Liechtenstein
- Taxation in Liechtenstein
  - 2008 Liechtenstein tax affair

=== Branches of the government of Liechtenstein ===
Government of Liechtenstein

==== Executive branch of the government of Liechtenstein ====
- Head of state: Prince of Liechtenstein, Hans-Adam II
- Head of government: Prime Minister of Liechtenstein, Brigitte Haas
- Cabinet of Liechtenstein

==== Legislative branch of the government of Liechtenstein ====
- Landtag of Liechtenstein (unicameral)

==== Judicial branch of the government of Liechtenstein ====
Court system of Liechtenstein

- Supreme Court of Liechtenstein (Oberster Gerichtshof)
  - Princely Superior Court of Liechtenstein (Fürstliches Obergericht)
    - Princely Court of Liechtenstein (Fürstliches Landgericht)

=== Foreign relations of Liechtenstein ===
Foreign relations of Liechtenstein

- Diplomatic missions in Liechtenstein
- Diplomatic missions of Liechtenstein
- Liechtenstein–Switzerland relations
- Liechtenstein–United States relations

==== International organization membership ====
The Principality of Liechtenstein is a member of:

- Council of Europe (CE)
- European Bank for Reconstruction and Development (EBRD)
- European Free Trade Association (EFTA)
- International Atomic Energy Agency (IAEA)
- International Criminal Court (ICCt)
- International Criminal Police Organization (Interpol)
- International Federation of Red Cross and Red Crescent Societies (IFRCS)
- International Olympic Committee (IOC)
- International Red Cross and Red Crescent Movement (ICRM)
- International Telecommunication Union (ITU)
- International Telecommunications Satellite Organization (ITSO)
- Inter-Parliamentary Union (IPU)
- Organization for Security and Cooperation in Europe (OSCE)
- Organisation for the Prohibition of Chemical Weapons (OPCW)
- Permanent Court of Arbitration (PCA)
- United Nations (UN)
- United Nations Conference on Trade and Development (UNCTAD)
- Universal Postal Union (UPU)
- World Confederation of Labour (WCL)
- World Intellectual Property Organization (WIPO)
- World Trade Organization (WTO)

=== Law and order in Liechtenstein ===
Law of Liechtenstein

- Constitution of Liechtenstein
  - 1862 Constitution of Liechtenstein
- Crime in Liechtenstein
- Human rights in Liechtenstein
  - LGBT rights in Liechtenstein
    - Recognition of same-sex unions in Liechtenstein
  - Freedom of religion in Liechtenstein
- Law enforcement in Liechtenstein
  - Capital punishment in Liechtenstein

=== Military of Liechtenstein ===
Military of Liechtenstein

- Command
  - Commander-in-chief: None, Defence is the responsibility of Switzerland
    - Ministry of Defence of Liechtenstein: None, Defence is the responsibility of Switzerland
- Forces
  - None, Defence is the responsibility of Switzerland
- Military history of Liechtenstein
- Military ranks of Liechtenstein

=== Local government in Liechtenstein ===
Municipalities of Liechtenstein

Flag	Postal Code and Name	Population (Dec. 31, 2005)	Area in km^{2}	Towns
Electoral District Unterland
Ruggell	9491 Ruggell	1925	7,4	Ruggell
Schellenberg	9488 Schellenberg	974	3,5	Schellenberg
Gamprin	9487 Gamprin	1436	6,1	Gamprin; Bendern
Eschen	9492 Eschen	4076	10,3	Eschen; Nendeln
Mauren	9493 Mauren	3649	7,5	Mauren; Schaanwald
Electoral District Oberland
Schaan	9494 Schaan	5811	26,8	Schaan
Planken	9498 Planken	366	5,3	Planken
Vaduz	9490 Vaduz	5047	17,3	Vaduz
Triesenberg	9497 Triesenberg	2542	29,8	Triesenberg, Masescha, Silum; Gaflei, Steg, Malbun
Triesen	9495 Triesen	4643	26,4	Triesen
Balzers	9496 Balzers	4436	19,6	Balzers; Mäls
Liechtenstein	Liechtenstein	34905	160,0	

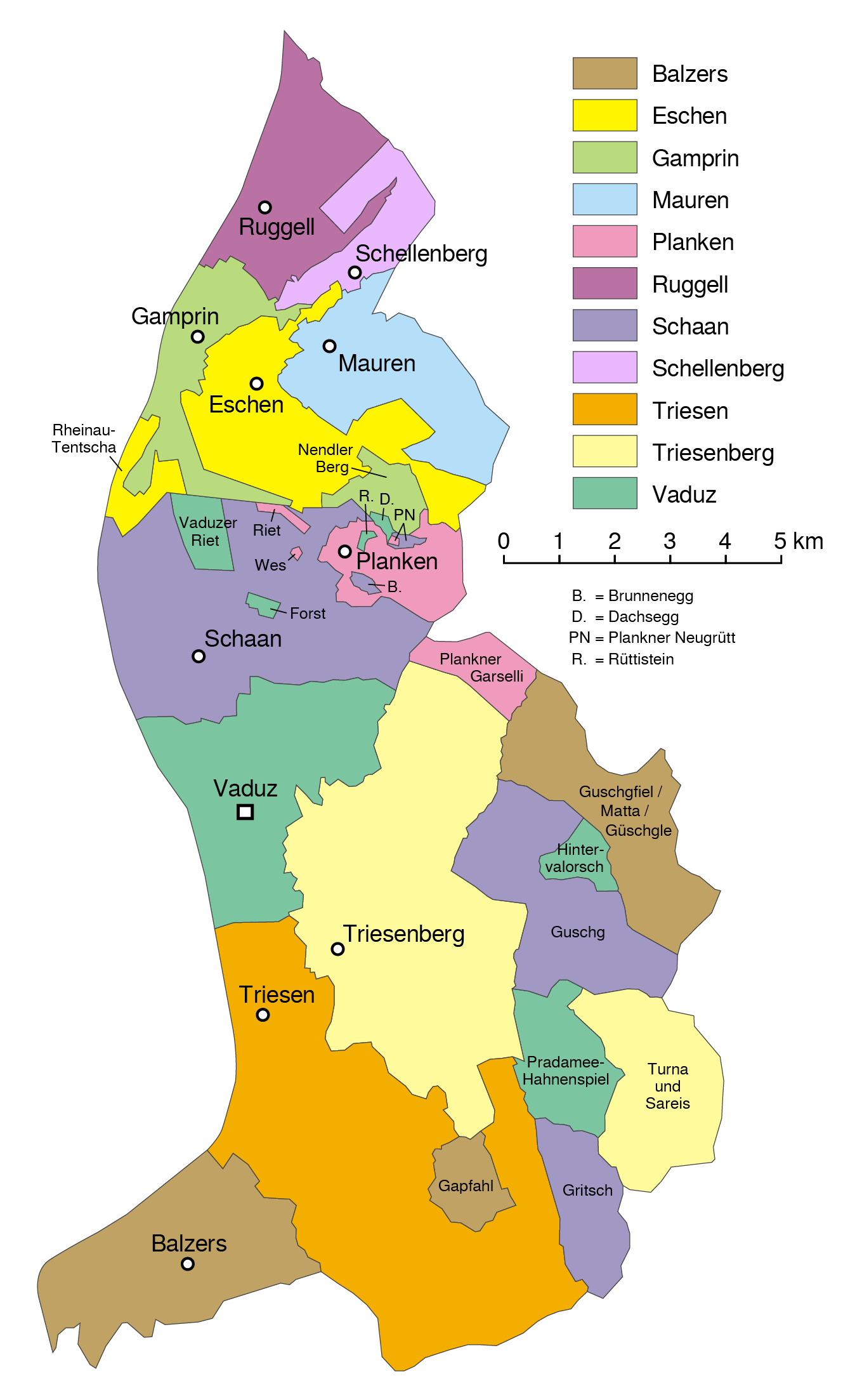

== History of Liechtenstein ==
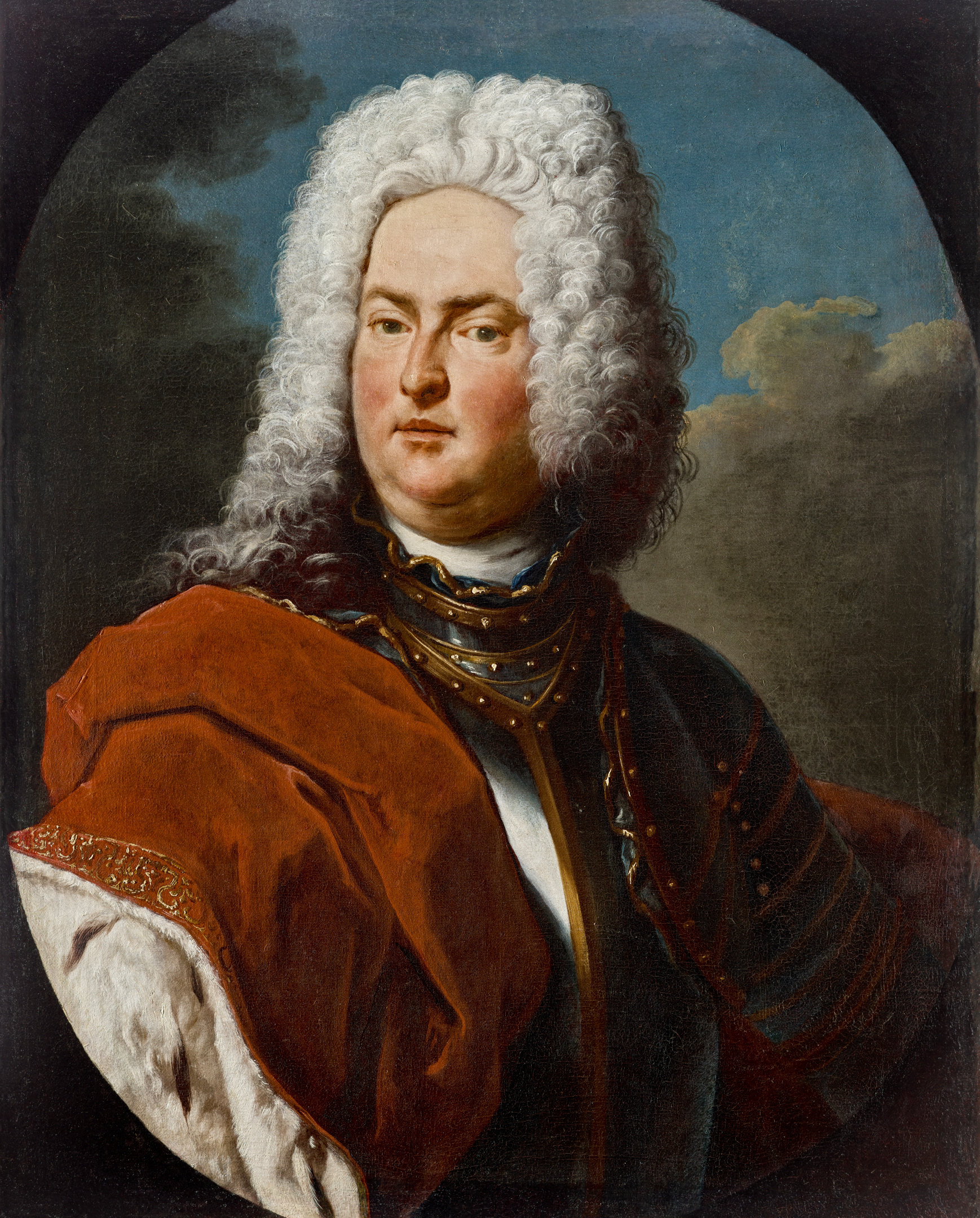
Hans-Adam I, Prince of Liechtenstein acquired the territory of the Principality

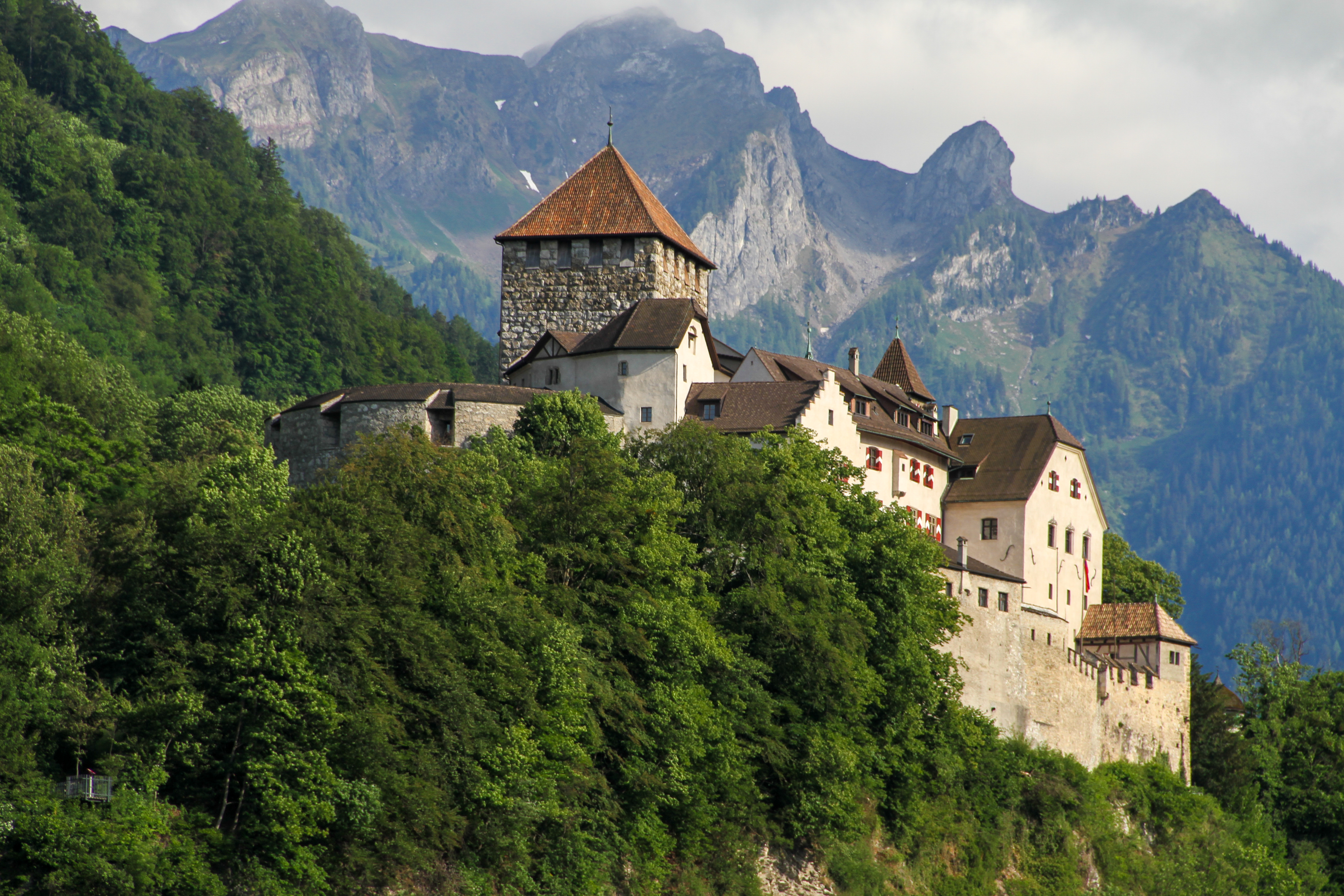
Vaduz Castle, built during the Middle Ages

History of Liechtenstein

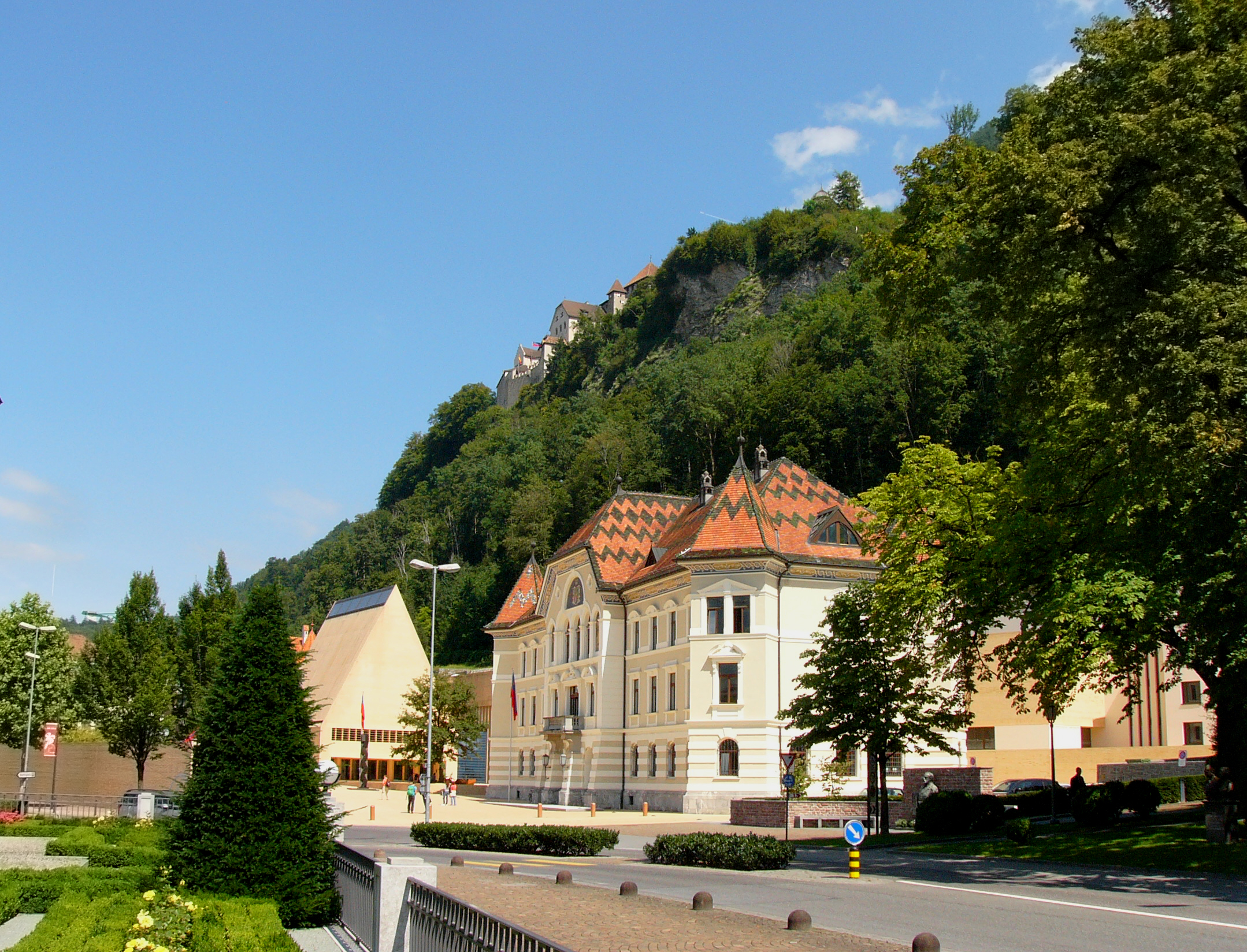
Architecture of Liechtenstein

- Timeline of the history of Liechtenstein
- Current events of Liechtenstein
- Military history of Liechtenstein

== Culture of Liechtenstein ==
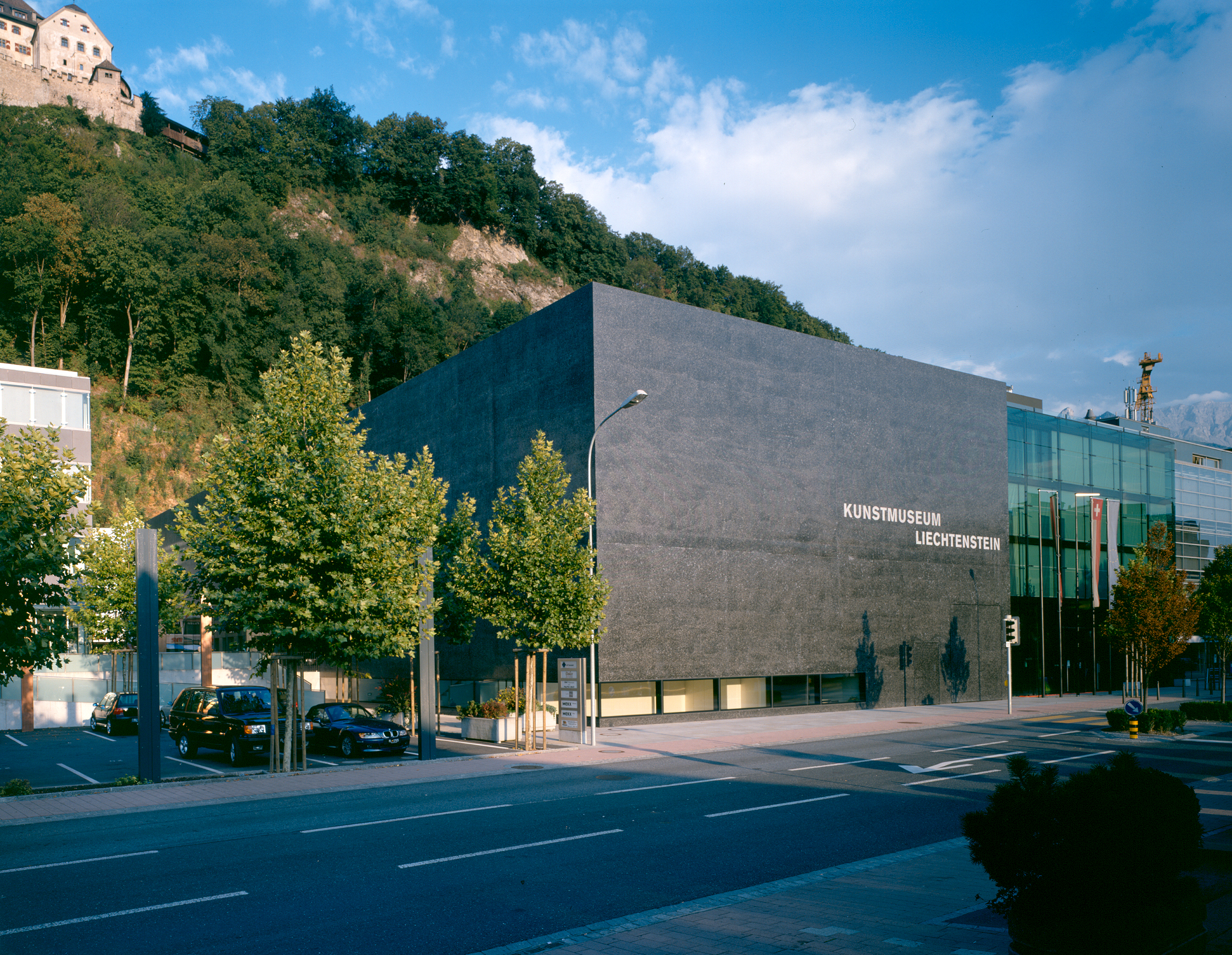
Liechtenstein Museum of Fine Arts in Vaduz

Culture of Liechtenstein

- Architecture of Liechtenstein
  - Castles in Liechtenstein
- Art in Liechtenstein
  - Art in Liechtenstein
  - Cinema of Liechtenstein
  - Literature of Liechtenstein
  - Music of Liechtenstein
  - Theatre in Liechtenstein
- Cuisine of Liechtenstein
  - Liechtenstein wine
- Festivals in Liechtenstein
- Languages of Liechtenstein
- Media in Liechtenstein
  - Television in Liechtenstein
- National symbols of Liechtenstein
  - Coat of arms of Liechtenstein
  - Flag of Liechtenstein
  - National anthem of Liechtenstein
- People of Liechtenstein
- Pfadfinder und Pfadfinderinnen Liechtensteins
- Prostitution in Liechtenstein
- Public holidays in Liechtenstein
- Records of Liechtenstein
- Religion in Liechtenstein
  - Buddhism in Liechtenstein
  - Christianity in Liechtenstein
  - Hinduism in Liechtenstein
  - Islam in Liechtenstein
  - Judaism in Liechtenstein
  - Sikhism in Liechtenstein
- World Heritage Sites in Liechtenstein: None

=== Sports in Liechtenstein ===
Sports in Liechtenstein

- Liechtensteiner National Badminton Championships
- Football in Liechtenstein
- Liechtenstein at the Olympics

== Economy and infrastructure of Liechtenstein ==
Economy of Liechtenstein

- Economic rank, by nominal GDP (2007): 147th (one hundred and forty seventh)
- Agriculture in Liechtenstein
- Banking in Liechtenstein
  - National bank of Liechtenstein
- Communications in Liechtenstein
  - Internet in Liechtenstein
- Companies of Liechtenstein
- Currency of Liechtenstein: Frank/Franc
  - ISO 4217: SUS
- Energy in Liechtenstein
  - Energy policy of Liechtenstein
  - Oil industry in Liechtenstein
- Health care in Liechtenstein
- Mining in Liechtenstein
- Liechtenstein Stock Exchange
- Tourism in Liechtenstein
  - Visa policy of Liechtenstein
- Transport in Liechtenstein
  - Airports in Liechtenstein
  - Rail transport in Liechtenstein
  - Liechtenstein Bus
  - Roads in Liechtenstein

== Education in Liechtenstein ==
Education in Liechtenstein

== See also ==
- Index of Liechtenstein-related articles
- List of Liechtenstein-related topics
- List of international rankings
- Member state of the United Nations
- Outline of Europe
- Outline of geography
