= Index of Liechtenstein-related articles =

This is an index of Liechtenstein related topics.

== 0-9 ==
1928 Liechtenstein embezzlement scandal

1939 Liechtenstein putsch

== A ==
Adolf Heeb
Adrian Hasler
Anna Maria of Liechtenstein
Anton Florian of Liechtenstein

== B ==
Balzers

== C ==
Christian-Social People's Party
Coat of arms of Liechtenstein
Constitution of Liechtenstein
Constitution of the Princely House of Liechtenstein
Count Rietberg

== D ==
Demographics of Liechtenstein
Doubly landlocked
Ducal hat of Liechtenstein
Duke of Troppau

== E ==
Economy of Liechtenstein
Elections in Liechtenstein
Eschen
Evangelical Church in Liechtenstein

== F ==
FC Vaduz
Flag of Liechtenstein
Foreign relations of Liechtenstein
Free List

== G ==
Gamprin
Gemeinden
German National Movement in Liechtenstein
Grauspitz

== H ==
Healthcare in Liechtenstein
Hilti
Holy Roman Empire
House of Liechtenstein

== I ==
The Independents
Islam in Liechtenstein

== J ==
Joseph Johann Adam, Prince of Liechtenstein
Joseph Wenzel I, Prince of Liechtenstein,

== K ==
Klaus Tschütscher
Kunstmuseum Liechtenstein

== L ==
Landtag of Liechtenstein
Languages of Liechtenstein
Law enforcement in Liechtenstein
Liechtenstein
Liechtenstein Army
Liechtenstein Bus
Liechtenstein Castle
Liechtensteiner cuisine
Liechtenstein Football Association
Liechtenstein heraldry
Liechtenstein Homeland Service
Liechtenstein identity card
Liechtenstein Museum
Liechtenstein national football team
Liechtenstein National Museum
Liechtenstein passport
Liechtenstein State Library
Liechtenstein wine
Liechtenstein witch trials
Liechtensteiner cuisine
Liechtensteiners
Liechtensteinische Post

== M ==
Mauren
Monarchy of Liechtenstein
Municipalities of Liechtenstein

== N ==
National Bank of Liechtenstein
National Anthem

November 1918 Liechtenstein putsch

== O ==
Order of Merit of the Principality of Liechtenstein
Orders, decorations, and medals of Liechtenstein

== P ==
Patriotic Union
Planken
Politics of Liechtenstein
Postage stamps and postal history of Liechtenstein
Prince of Liechtenstein
Private University in the Principality of Liechtenstein
Progressive Citizens' Party

== R ==
Rail transport in Liechtenstein
Religion in Liechtenstein
Roman Catholic Archdiocese of Vaduz
Russian Monument (Liechtenstein)
Referendum on Women's Suffrage
Roman Catholic Archdiocese of Vaduz
Ruggell

== S ==
Schaan
Schaan-Vaduz railway station
Schellenberg
Swiss franc

== T ==
Telecommunications in Liechtenstein
Telephone numbers in Liechtenstein
The Independents
Triesen
Triesenberg
Turks in Liechtenstein

== U ==
University of Liechtenstein

== V ==
Vaduz
Vaduz Castle
Vaduz Cathedral
Vehicle registration plates of Liechtenstein

== W ==
Wolfgang Haas
