= Liechtenstein cuisine =

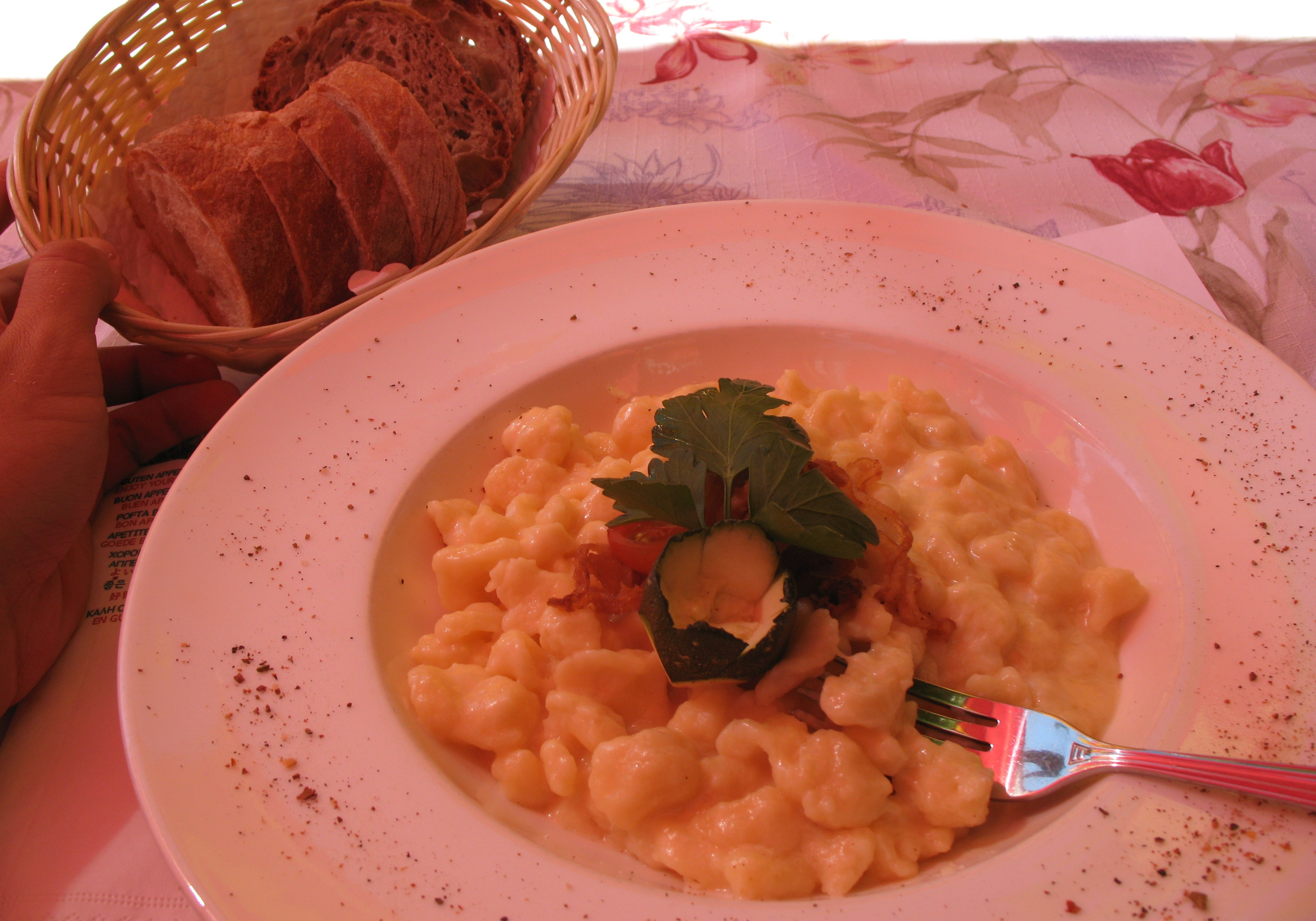
Pasta from the Protector's Garden café in Vaduz

The cuisine of Liechtenstein is diverse, having been influenced by the cuisine of nearby countries, particularly Switzerland and Austria, as well as other countries in Central Europe. Cheeses and soups are integral to Liechtensteiner cuisine, and milk products are also commonplace in the country, due to an expansive dairy industry. Common vegetables include greens, potatoes, and cabbage, while widely consumed meats include beef, chicken and pork. The consumption of three meals a day is commonplace, and meals are often formal.

== Common foods and dishes ==
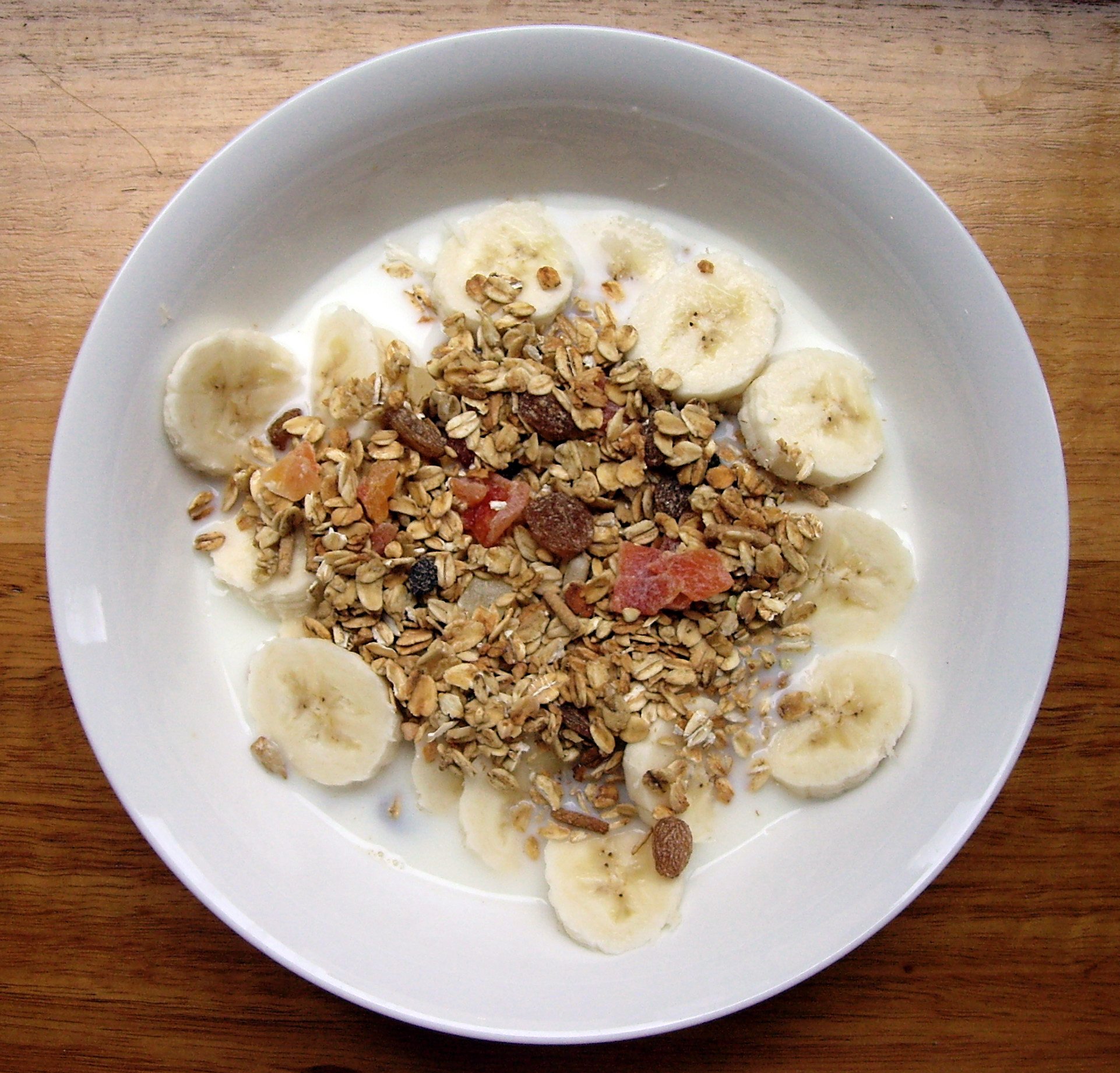
Muesli is a common breakfast dish in Liechtensteiner cuisine

- Asparagus – frequently used
- Bread
- Hafalaab – a soup with ham or bacon and cornmeal dumplings
- Kasknopfl – small dumplings topped with cheese or onions
- Liver
- Muesli – uncooked rolled oats, fruit and nuts that have been soaked in water or juice
- Pastries
- Ribel – a grain
- Rösti – a dish prepared with coarsely grated potato that is fried. It may include regional variations that utilize additional ingredients
- Sandwiches
- Sauerkas – a cheese produced in Liechtenstein
- Schnitzel – a breaded cutlet dish made with boneless meat thinned with a mallet.
- Smoked meats
- Torkarebl – a porridge dish that resembles dumplings
- Wurst – smoked sausages
- Yogurt

== Common beverages ==
- Beer
- Cocoa
- Coffee
- Milk – consumed as a beverage by many Liechtensteiners
- Wine – the country has its own wine industry

== See also ==
- Liechtenstein wine
