= Liechtenstein heraldry =

Liechtenstein heraldry is the form of heraldic art found in the country of Liechtenstein. It does not have a heraldic body of its own, relying on primarily German influences through the ruling house. It follows the German-Nordic tradition.

== National coat of arms ==
The coat-of-arms of the Princely House of Liechtenstein is also used as the great arms of the nation. As the sovereign emblem of the Principality of Liechtenstein, its use is reserved for the members of the Princely House and state authorities. Private individuals may be authorized to use the great arms, if it is in the interest of the State. The arms are a history of the Princely House, and show the many different areas of Europe with which Liechtenstein has been involved, either by conquest or by marriage.

It has been in use since around 1630. It is referred to in blazon as: Quarterly (1) Or an Eagle displayed Sable crowned and armed of the first charged with a crescent trefly Argent ending in crosses (2) Barry of eight Or and Sable charged with crancelin Vert (3) Per pale Gules and Argent (4) Or a maiden eagle displayed Sable the human part Argent crowned and armed of the first (Enty in point chapé) in base Azure a Hunting Horn stringed Or (Overall) An Escutcheon per fess Or and Gules

The whole achievement (entire rendering with supporters) is surrounded by the Princely cloak, or mantle, Purpure and lined Ermine and ensigned with the Princely hat.

== Municipal heraldry ==
Coat of arms of Vaduz, left, and of Schaan, typical, right

Each of the eleven municipalities of Liechtenstein bears a shield, which contain a wide range of heraldic features. The capital municipality, Vaduz, has the most complex, recognising its status as the home of the ruling house. Coats of arms such as that of Schaan are typical, with a two or three colour field and primary charge(s).

== See also ==
- Flag of Liechtenstein
