= Evangelical Church in Liechtenstein =

Protestant denomination in Liechtenstein

Evangelical Church of Liechtenstein
- Evangelische Kirche Liechtenstein
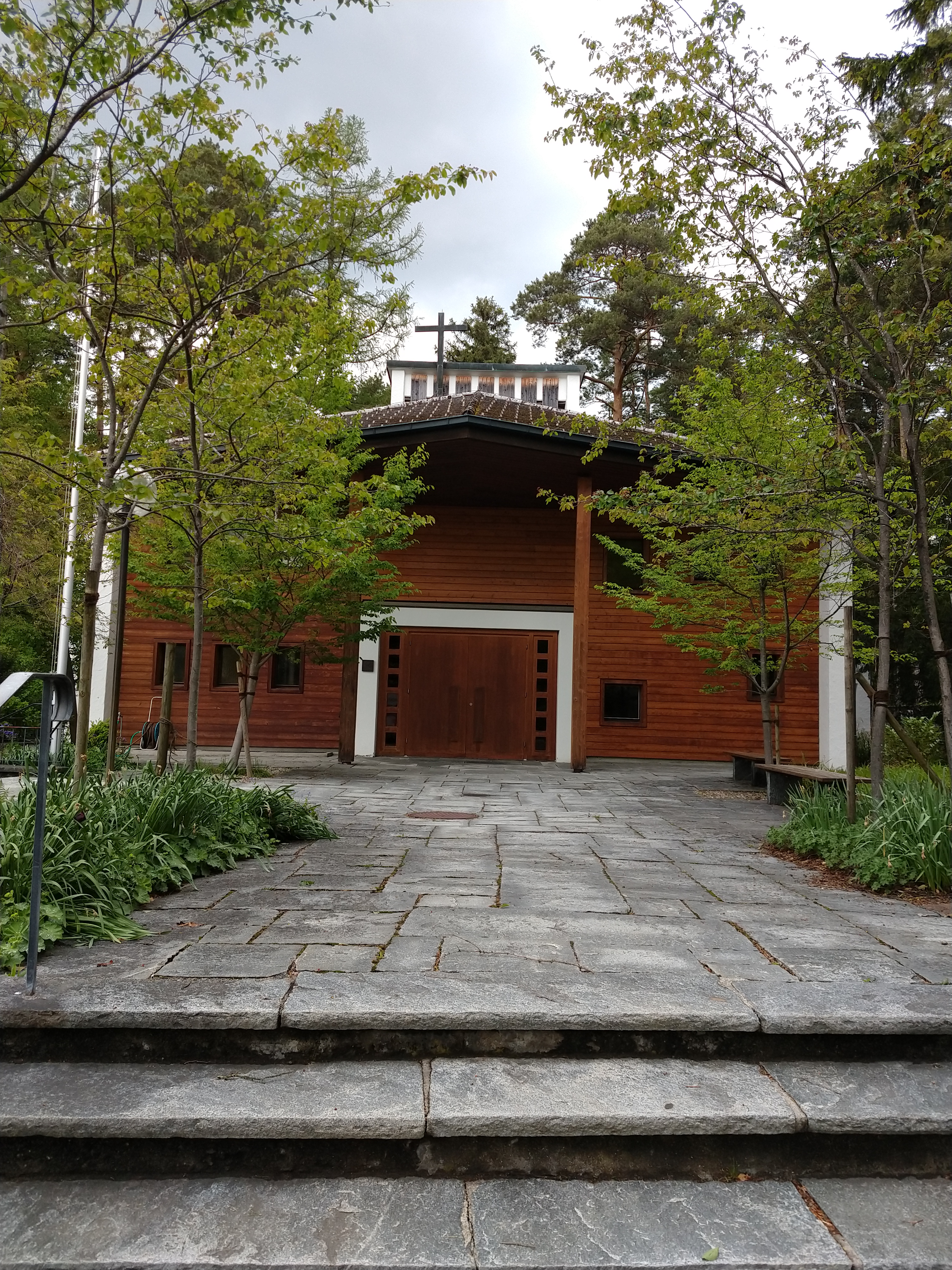
- Classification: Protestant
- Orientation: United Protestant (Lutheran & Reformed)
- Leader: Johannes Jung
- Associations: Protestant Church of Switzerland, Communion of Protestant Churches in Europe
- Region: Liechtenstein
- Headquarters: Vaduz, Liechtenstein
- Origin: 1944
- Merger of: Evangelical Associates of Triesen, Vaduz/Schaan and Eschen/Mauren
- Members: ~2,600
- Official website: https://www.kirchefl.li/

The Evangelical Church in Liechtenstein (Note: German: Evangelische Kirche Liechtenstein) is the united church (Reformed and Lutheran) in Liechtenstein. The church comprises a single parish, located in the Ebenholz neighborhood of Vaduz.

== History ==
Johann II, Prince of Liechtenstein permitted religious freedom in the country in 1880, which saw the formation of religious associations, including a Protestant association for textile workers in Triesenberg.. Two other evangelical associations formed, serving Vaduz/Schaan (1938) and Eschen/Mauren (1943). These three associations merged in 1944, creating the "Association of Evangelicals in the Principality of Liechtenstein". Until 1952, pastors from Switzerland and Austria served the Protestant community, when a part-time parish office was opened, with a full-time office opening in 1958. In 1961, the Association of Evangelicals in the Principality of Liechtenstein became the "Evangelical Church in the Principality of Liechtenstein", and was this was shortened to the current name in 1970.

The church originally met it school buildings and other structures they were permitted to use. In 1958, the Jenny & Spoerry company donated land for the church, and with financing from the church, the principality and Swiss protestant churches, a church building designed by Liechtensteiner architect Franz Hasler was completed in 1963.

== See also ==
- Religion in Liechtenstein
