= Geology of Liechtenstein =

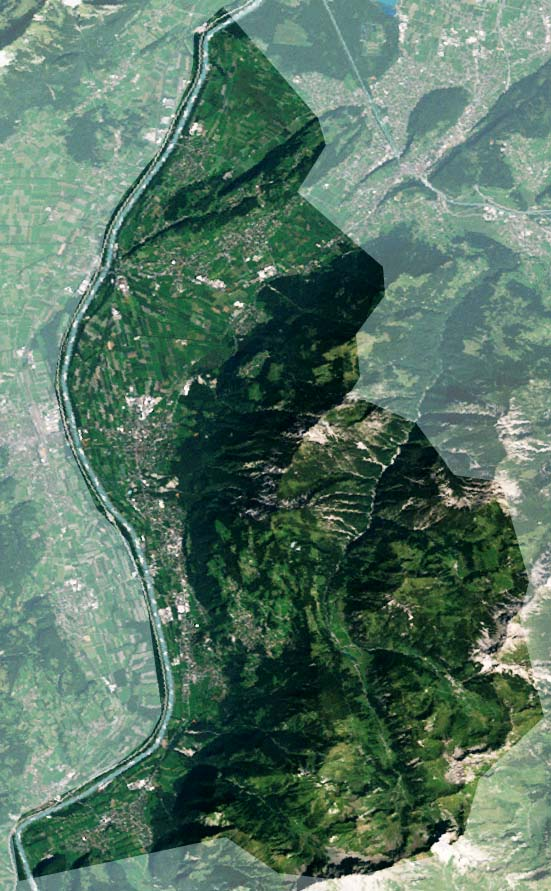
Satellite view of Liechtenstein

The geology of Liechtenstein formed at the intersection of the Eastern and Western Alps. One of the smallest countries in the world, Liechtenstein occupies a wider than average river valley, along the right (east) bank of the Rhine, running north–south. A spur of the Rätikon Mountains flanks the river to the east, while Eschnerberg is a defining topographic high point in the north.

== Stratigraphy and tectonics ==
The Santis-Drusberg Nappe (a nappe formation) crops out in the Schellenberg anticline containing Early Cretaceous marine sediments together with deeper water limestone and foraminifera fossils.

From Dogger to Malm, in the Ultrahelvetic realm the Flascherberg is assembled from limestone and black shale. Geologists divide the Northern Flysch Nappes into the lower Uentschen Nappe and the upper Liechtenstein Flysch. The Southern Flysch Nappe includes the Prattigau Flysch, which "pinches out" near the northern border. The Uentschen Nappe is made up of turbidite sediments from the Maastrichtian, while the Liechtenstein Flysch is geologically similar but younger—from the Paleocene.

These tectonic structures are overlain by the Falknis Nappe, north of the village of Triesen and composed of Jurassic marine sediments. The Lechtal Nappe is the only prominent nappe in the Eastern Alps.

During the last 2.5 million years of the Quaternary, the Rhine Glacier deepened the valley together with the Ill Glacier. Ancient Lake Constance flooded the area, deposited fine lake bed sediments which now cover much of the country's land surface. Major landslides were common into the early Holocene.

== Natural resource geology ==
Liechtenstein has few natural resources, aside from alluvial gravel used by the local concrete industry. Gravel extraction from the river interfered with groundwater flows and was banned after 1972. Historically, peat was extracted in the north of the country, but this has also stopped.
