= List of companies of Liechtenstein =

Liechtenstein is a principality in the Alps and a microstate. Despite its small landmass of only 160 km^{2} and a population of 38,111 Liechtenstein has a very successful industrial sector and a strong banking industry, making the country one of the most prosperous nations in the world. The domestic unemployment rate is 1,7 % and about 54% of all employees employed in Liechtenstein are commuters from neighbouring countries.

== Notable firms ==
This list includes notable companies with primary headquarters located in the country. The industry and sector follow the Industry Classification Benchmark taxonomy.

Notable companies Status: P=Private, S=State; A=Active, D=Defunct
Name	Industry	Sector	Headquarters	Founded	Notes	Status	
Hilcona	Consumer goods	Food products	Schaan	1935	Convenience food	P	A
Hilti	Consumer goods	Home construction	Schaan	1941	Power tools	P	A
Intamin	Industrials	Amusement rides	Schaan	1967	Thrill rides and roller coasters	P	A
Ivoclar Vivadent	Health care	Medical equipment	Schaan	1923	Dental technology	P	A
Jehle	Consumer goods	Automobiles	Schaan	1970s	Sports cars	P	D
LGT Group	Financials	Banks	Vaduz	1920	Fully owned by the private foundation of the prince	P	A
Liechtenstein Bus	Industrials	Transportation services	Schaan	2012	Bus company	P	A
Liechtensteinische Post	Industrials	Delivery services	Schaan	2000	Postal service	P	A
Medixsysteme	Health care	Medical equipment	Ruggell	2002	Aesthetic medicine	P	A
National Bank of Liechtenstein	Financials	Banks	Vaduz	1861	Majority of all shares are state-owned	P	A
Neutrik	Industrials	Electrical components & equipment	Schaan	1975	Connectors	P	A
NTi Audio	Industrials	Electronic equipment	Schaan	2000	Acoustic test instruments	P	A
Oerlikon Balzers	Industrials	Industrial machinery	Balzers	1946	Surface technologies	P	A
INFICON Balzers	Industrials	Industrial machinery	Balzers	2000	Sensor technology, surface technologies	P	A
Orca Engineering	Consumer goods	Automobiles	Schaan	1987	Sports cars	P	D
VP Bank	Financials	Banks	Vaduz	1956	Important activity in investment funds	P	A

== See also ==
- Economy of Liechtenstein
