= Buddhism in Liechtenstein =

In 2020, 0.03% of the population of Liechtenstein were Buddhist; this is approximately 10 people. This could be the smallest Buddhist community in the world.

According to a report in 2006 there were 72 Buddhists in the country (0.22% of the total population as of 2002).

There is only 1 Buddhist centre in Vaduz, the capital of Liechtenstein.

== See also ==
- Religion in Liechtenstein
