= Postage stamps and postal history of Liechtenstein =

A 1921 mint stamp of the Principality of Liechtenstein depicting Gutenberg Castle

This is a survey of the postage stamps and postal history of Liechtenstein.

The Principality of Liechtenstein is a doubly landlocked Alpine microstate in Western Europe, bordered by Switzerland to the west and south and by Austria to the east. Its area is just over 160 square kilometres (62 sq mi), and it has an estimated population of 37,000. Its capital is Vaduz and the biggest town is Schaan.

The postal history of the principality pre-dates introduction of the first postage stamps in 1850. The principality was obliged to use Austrian stamps until 1912 when the first Liechtenstein issues were produced, although these were still issued under Austrian direction. Following the collapse of Habsburg Austria in 1918, Liechtenstein secured postal independence and began issuing its own stamps from July 1920.

== Postal history ==
Liechtenstein is known to have been on the mail route from Milan to Lindau in the 15th century as two postal stations were established at Balzers and Schaan. The Austro-Hungarian Empire established its state post in 1770 and, in 1819, it opened a collecting office in Balzers. This closed two years later because it could not compete with the Milan route but, in 1827, the Austrians reopened it. A second Austrian office was opened at Vaduz in 1845.

The first Austro-Hungarian stamps were issued on 1 June 1850 and were immediately valid for use in Liechtenstein. Additional post offices opened at Nendeln in 1864, at Schaan in 1872, at Triersena in 1890 and at Eschen in 1912. The Nendeln office closed in 1912. Austrian stamps were valid in Liechtenstein until 31 January 1921.

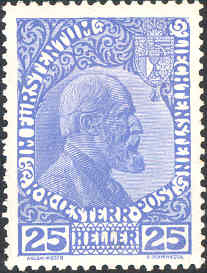
A 1912 stamp of Liechtenstein

== First stamps ==
The first stamps specific to Liechtenstein were issued on 1 February 1912. Although these honoured the reigning Johann II, Prince of Liechtenstein (1840–1929), they were still subject to Austrian mandate and the full inscription on them was K. K. Österr. Post im Fürstentum Liechtenstein (The Imperial and Royal Austrian Post in the Principality of Liechtenstein). The designs and values were done according to the Austrian standard and they were printed by the Austrian Government Works in Vienna. The first three stamps were a green 5 heller, a red 10 heller and a blue 25 heller. There were 100 heller to the Austro-Hungarian krone.

== Postal independence ==
Liechtenstein was reluctantly a nominal partner of the Austro-Hungarians during World War I but, as no fighting took place in the principality, it managed to maintain a de facto neutrality. The Liechtensteiners were determined to assert complete independence of Austria after the Habsburg collapse and establishment of the country's own postal administration service was a high priority. After World War I and the dissolution of Austro-Hungarian Empire, the Post Office became independent, but later was associated with Switzerland. Austrian stamps were officially declared invalid from 1 March 1920, although the 1912 Johann II issue remained valid until 1921.

Liechtenstein's own first definitives, simply inscribed Fürstentum Liechtenstein, were issued in July 1920. The currency on these remained 100 heller = 1 krone but Liechtenstein entered a customs and monetary union with Switzerland in the same year and switched currency to 100 rappen = 1 Swiss franc. The rappen became postal currency in 1921, at first as a surcharge on heller types. Although Liechtenstein's postal administration is independent, in practice it is feasible for it to operate within Swiss postal territory. Therefore, it issues its own stamps but Swiss postal regulations apply.

== See also ==
- Zumstein catalog

== Sources ==
- Gibbons, Stanley (1970). Postage Stamp Catalogue: Europe and Colonies (60th ed.). London: Stanley Gibbons Ltd.
- Gibbons, Stanley (1985). Stamps of the World (15th ed.). London: Stanley Gibbons Publications Ltd. ISBN 0-85259-088-1.
- Gibbons, Stanley (2003). Stamp Catalogue, Part 8: Italy & Switzerland (6th ed.). London: Stanley Gibbons Publications Ltd. ISBN 0-85259-554-9.
- Rossiter, Stuart; Flower, John (1989). The Stamp Atlas. London: MacDonald & Co. ISBN 0-356-18043-3.
