= Liechtensteiner National Badminton Championships =

The Liechtensteiner National Badminton Championships is a tournament organized to crown the best badminton players in Liechtenstein. The first edition of the tournament was held on 22 March 1986.

== Past winners ==
Year	Men's singles	Women's singles	Men's doubles	Women's doubles	Mixed doubles
1986	Armand Jehle	Cornelia Marxer	Armand Jehle; Markus Becker	Cornelia Marxer; Astrid Wanger	Lothar Iser; Astrid Wanger
1987	Armand Jehle	Cornelia Marxer	Armand Jehle; Markus Becker	Cornelia Marxer; Astrid Wanger	Lothar Iser; Astrid Wanger
1988	Armand Jehle	Cornelia Marxer	Günther Schädler; Mario Minder	Cornelia Marxer; Astrid Wanger	Mario Minder; Astrid Wanger
1989	Mario Minder	Astrid Wanger	Günther Schädler; Mario Minder	Cornelia Marxer; Astrid Wanger	Mario Minder; Astrid Wanger
1990	Mario Minder	Myriam Elsensohn	Ernst Bolkart; Roland Hilti	no competition	Mario Minder; Astrid Wanger
1991	Armand Jehle	Astrid Eidenbenz	Thomas Fischer; Günther Schädler	Carolin Frommelt; Astrid Wanger	Thomas Fischer; Astrid Wanger
1992	Armand Jehle	Nadine Velten	Thomas Fischer; Günther Schädler	Andrea Fischer; Silvia Baur	Thomas Fischer; Andrea Fischer
1993	Michel Baumgartner	Nadine Velten	no competition		
1994	Günther Schädler	Nadine Velten	Lothar Iser; Edi Niedhart	Michaela Ritter; Nadine Velten	Roger Jacquat; Patrizia Wanger
1995	Andreas Radl	Claudia Jehle	Lothar Iser; Ralf Iser	Karin Lehmann; Birgit Oehri	Andreas Radl; Karin Lehmann
1996	Günther Schädler	Astrid Eidenbenz	Andreas Radl; Sandro Woodtli	Daniela Kressig; Vreni Altherr	Sandro Woodtli; Georgia Timmermann
1997	Armand Jehle	Anja Buechel	Kilian Pfister; Roger Jacquat	Anja Büchel; Michaela Ritter	Roger Jacquat; Patrizia Wanger
1998	Armand Jehle	Astrid Eidenbenz	Kilian Pfister; Frank Kamsma	no competition	
1999	Günther Schädler	Bettina Kaiser	Kilian Pfister; Frank Kamsma	Bettina Kaiser; Claudia Jehle	Kilian Pfister; Bettina Kaiser
2000	Kilian Pfister	Michaela Ritter	Kilian Pfister; Frank Kamsma	Claudia Jehle; Carolin Schneider	Kilian Pfister; Carolin Schneider
2001	Armand Jehle	Michaela Ritter	Armand Jehle; Bruno Staeheli	Claudia Jehle; Carolin Schneider	Kilian Pfister; Carolin Schneider
2002	Kilian Pfister	Claudia Jehle	Kilian Pfister; Walter Sturm	Astrid Eidenbenz; Claudia Jehle	Kilian Pfister; Nadia Gartmann
2003	Andreas Radl	Michaela Ritter	Roland Hilti; Zeno John	Michaela Ritter; Doris DiMarzio	Zeno John; Michaela Ritter
2004	Kilian Pfister	Daniela Kressig	Andreas Radl; Kilian Pfister	Claudia Jehle; Carolin Schneider	Walter Sturm; Carolin Schneider
2005	Kilian Pfister	Daniela Litscher	Michael Litscher; Roger Jacquat	Claudia Jehle; Carolin Schneider	Kilian Pfister; Doris DiMarzio
2006	Kilian Pfister	no competition	Roland Hilti; Kilian Pfister	Claudia Jehle; Carolin Schneider	Kilian Pfister; Doris DiMarzio
2007	Kilian Pfister	no competition	Roland Hilti; Kilian Pfister	no competition	Zeno John; Carolin Schneider
2008	Kilian Pfister	Nadia Gartmann	Roland Hilti; Kilian Pfister	Nadia Gartmann; Patricia Vögel	Kilian Pfister; Silvie Brouwer
2009	Roland Hilti	no competition	Armand Jehle; Bruno Stäheli	no competition	Michael Litscher; Nadia Gartmann
2010	Roland Hilti	no competition	Michael Litscher; Stanley Wee	Heather Booth; Patrizia Vögel	Stanley Wee; Heather Booth
2011	Michael Litscher	Carolin Schneider	Michael Litscher; Hubert Müller	Marina Wohlwend; Carolin Schneider	Michael Litscher; Nadia Gartmann
2012	Michael Litscher	no competition	Heinz Dünser; Matthias Ebneter	no competition	Michael Litscher; Carolin Schneider
2013	Michael Litscher	no competition	Heinz Dünser; Matthias Ebneter	Marina Wohlwend; Carolin Schneider	Michael Litscher; Nadia Gartmann
2014	Michael Litscher	no competition	Heinz Dünser; Matthias Ebneter	Marina Wohlwend; Carolin Schneider	Michael Litscher; Carolin Schneider
2015	Dominic Mettler	no competition	Dominic Mettler; Marco Langenegger	Daniela Litscher; Carolin Schneider	Heinz Dünser; Nadia Gartmann
2016	Dominic Mettler	no competition	Roland Hilti; Armand Jehle	Fabienne Schädler; Mirianda Frick	Stanley Wee; Carolin Schneider
2017	Dominic Mettler	Mirianda Frick	Dominic Mettler; Marco Langenegger	Mirianda Frick; Carolin Schneider	Dominic Mettler; Carolin Schneider
2018	Marco Langenegger	no competition	Dominic Mettler; Marco Langenegger	Mirianda Frick; Nadia Gartmann	Dominic Mettler; Carolin Schneider
2019	Dominic Mettler	no competition	Dominic Mettler; Marco Langenegger	Carolin Schneider; Rosi Frank	Dominic Mettler; Carolin Schneider
2020	Cancelled due to COVID-19				
2021	Dominic Mettler	no competition	Dominic Mettler; Marco Langenegger	not awarded	Nicola Stäheli; Mirianda Frick
2022	Dominic Mettler	no competition	Dominic Mettler; Marco Langenegger	Nadia Gartmann; Karin Roos	Marco Langenegger; Nicole Eisler
2023	Dominic Mettler	not awarded	Dominic Mettler; Marco Langenegger	not awarded	Mirco Lareida; Nadja Mettler
2024	Dominic Mettler	not awarded	Dominic Mettler; Marco Langenegger	not awarded	Mark Tran; Carolin Schneider
2025	Dominic Mettler	Andrina Castelberg	Dominic Mettler; Marco Langenegger	Carolin Schneider; Nadia Gartmann	Marco Langenegger; Andrina Castelberg
