= Telecommunications in Liechtenstein =

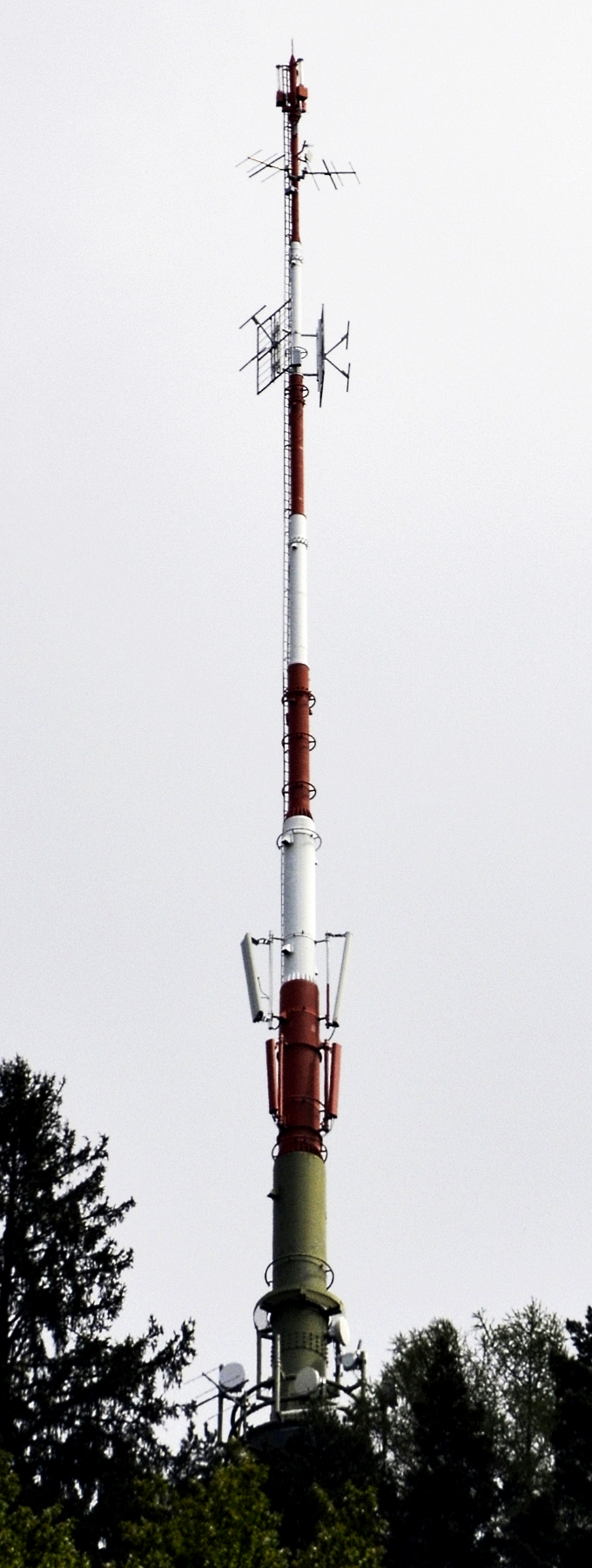
The Erbi transmitter in Vaduz

This article concerns the systems of communications in Liechtenstein. Liechtenstein possesses a number of modern communications systems, some of which are shared with the neighbouring country of Switzerland. The country code and top-level domain for Liechtenstein is .li.

== Telephone and internet ==
Liechtenstein's automatic telephone system is connected to the Swiss telephone networks via cable and microwave radio relay systems. There are approximately 10,000 main line telephones and over 51,000 mobile cellular subscriptions in the country. In April 1999, Liechtenstein ceased to be a part of the Swiss telephone numbering plan, in which the country used the Swiss area code "075", opting instead to have a unique country calling code, "+423". An estimated 97% of the population uses the internet.

== Radio and television ==
There are four FM radio broadcast stations in Liechtenstein serving 21,000 radios. The television broadcast system is linked to the Swiss networks, with the Swiss services serving 12,000 televisions in Liechtenstein.

== General references ==
- "Liechtenstein". The World Factbook. Central Intelligence Agency. 16 September 2025. Archived from the original on August 30, 2025.
