= Religion in Liechtenstein =

Religion in Liechtenstein in 2020
1. Catholicism (Official) (69.6%)
2. Protestantism (8.10%)
3. Other Christian (1.80%)
4. Islam (6.00%)
5. Other religion (1.00%)
6. Undeclared (4.00%)
7. Irreligion (9.60%)

The religion in Liechtenstein is predominantly Catholic, with a minority of Protestants, non-adherents, and adherents of other religions; it also has a small Muslim population, composed mainly of immigrants from countries including Bosnia and Herzegovina and Turkey.

In 2020, 79.5% of the population was Christian (69.6% were Catholic, 8.1% were Protestant Reformed and 1.8% other christian), 6% were Muslim, 9.6% had no religious beliefs, 1% were part of another religion and 4% did not respond. There were also approximately 30 Jews living in the country.

== Overview ==
The Roman Catholic Church, as written in the Constitution of Liechtenstein, is the official state religion of Liechtenstein. The constitution declares that the Catholic Church is "the State Church and as such shall enjoy the full protection of the State." Liechtenstein offers protection to adherents of all religious beliefs, and considers the "religious interests of the people" a priority of the government. In Liechtenstein schools, although exceptions are allowed, religious education in Catholicism or Protestantism is legally required. Tax exemption is granted by the government to religious organizations. According to the Pew Research Center, social conflict caused by religious hostilities is ranked low in Liechtenstein, and so is the amount of government restriction on the practice of religion.

Before 1997, within the Catholic church, the principality was part of the Swiss Diocese of Chur. The Vatican erected the new Archdiocese of Vaduz in 1997; it encompasses the entire territory of the principality. Reforms aimed at diminishing the influence of the Catholic Church on Liechtenstein's government have been supported by Prince Hans-Adam II.

In 2002, 83.9% of Liechtenstein's population were Christian (76% Catholic and 7% Protestant), 4.2% followed Islam, 0.8% followed Orthodox Christianity, and 12% are either non-religious or adherents of other faiths.

Religion	2020	2015	2010	2000	1990	1980
Catholics	69.6%	73.4%	75.9%	78.4%	84.9%	85.8%
Protestants	8.1%	8.2%	8.5%	8.3%	9.2%	10.3%
Christian-Orthodox Churches	1.5%	1.3%	1.1%	1.1%	0.7%	-
Other Christian Churches	0.3%	0.3%	0.3%	0.1%	0.2%	0.8%
Muslims	6.0%	5.9%	5.4%	4.8%	2.4%	1.7%
Other religions	1.0%	0.8%	0.8%	0.3%	0.2%	-
No religion	9.6%	7.0%	5.4%	2.8%	1.5%	-
Undeclared	4.0%	3.3%	2.6%	4.1%	0.9%	-

== Freedom of religion ==
In 2023, the country scored 4 out of 4 for religious freedom from Freedom House.

== See also ==
- Buddhism in Liechtenstein
- Catholic Church in Liechtenstein
- Roman Catholic Archdiocese of Vaduz
- Evangelical Church in Liechtenstein
- Federation of Evangelical Lutheran Churches in Switzerland and the Principality of Liechtenstein
- Islam in Liechtenstein
- History of the Jews in Liechtenstein
