= Liechtenstein wine =

Wine making in Liechtenstein

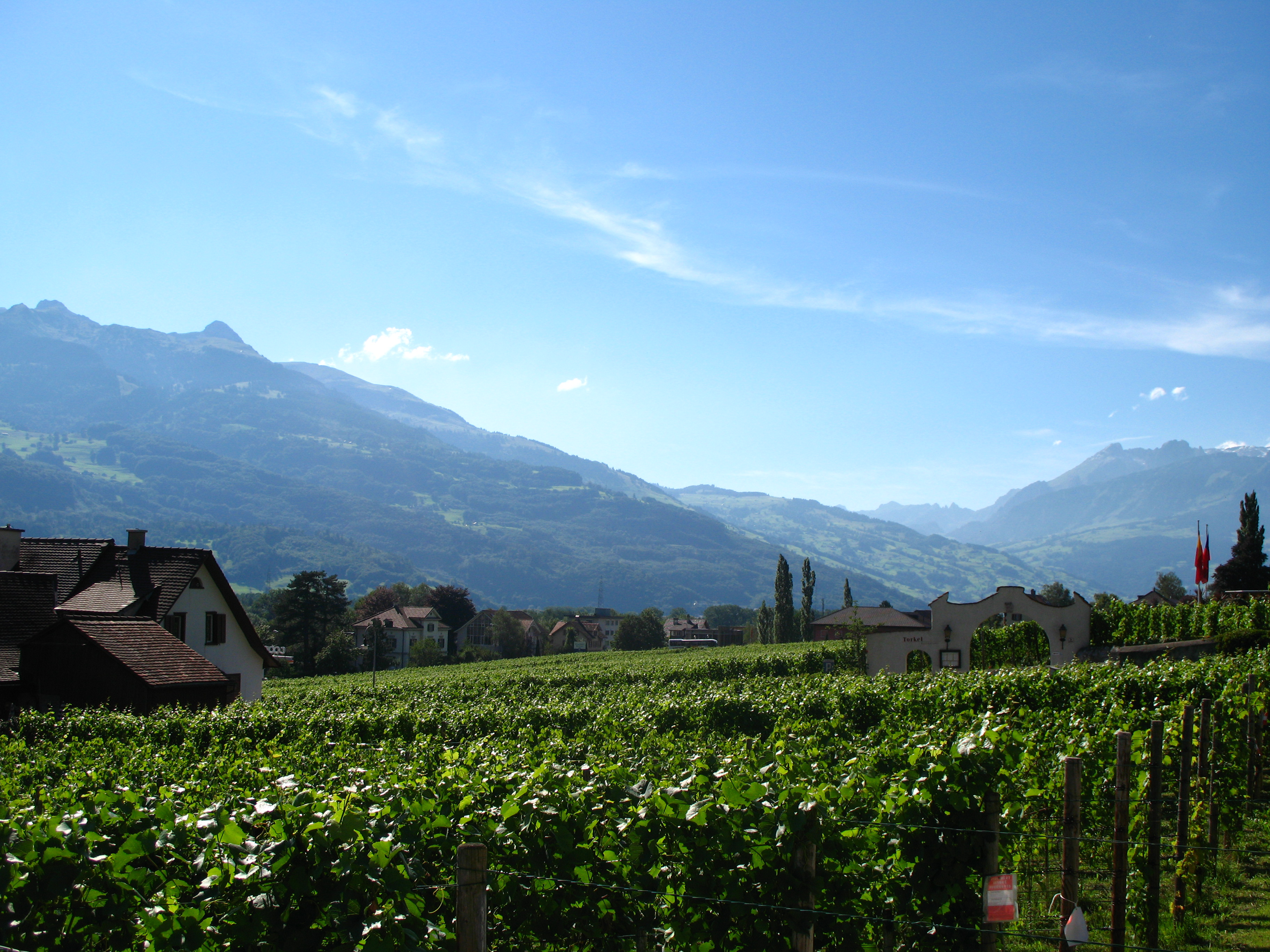
Vineyards near Vaduz

The Principality of Liechtenstein is a producer of wine. The country has a climate ideally suited for the cultivation of wine with mountain slopes facing southwest, calcareous soils and an average of 1,500 hours of sunshine a year. The hot dry wind during the summer months, known as the foehn aids cultivators by having a sweetening effect.

There are over 100 winegrowers in Liechtenstein which produce red and white wines in which despite the small size of the country can produce a significant variety. Liechtenstein is part of the European wine quality system and the international AOC classification.

== History ==
Viniculture in Liechtenstein dates back just over two thousand years. Growing began before Christ by a Celtic tribe that had settled in the area, and during Roman times production increased. After the Romans had been driven out of the area by the Alamanni, production virtually ceased, until the growth of Christianity in the 4th century, when monks encouraged the establishment of new vineyards. During the rule of Charlemagne (742–814), many of the municipalities and monasteries possessed their own vineyards. This time the vineyards surrounding Gutenberg Castle yielded some three thousand gallons of wine a year. Charlemagne did much to alter the method of production, strongly encouraging better hygiene and pressing of the grapes by making it practice for the wine pressers to wash their feet although he was met with considerable opposition.

The grape, Blauburgunder or Pinot noir, was introduced by Henri, duc de Rohan (1579–1638) who strongly encouraged the farmers of the Bündner Herrschaft to cultivate it.

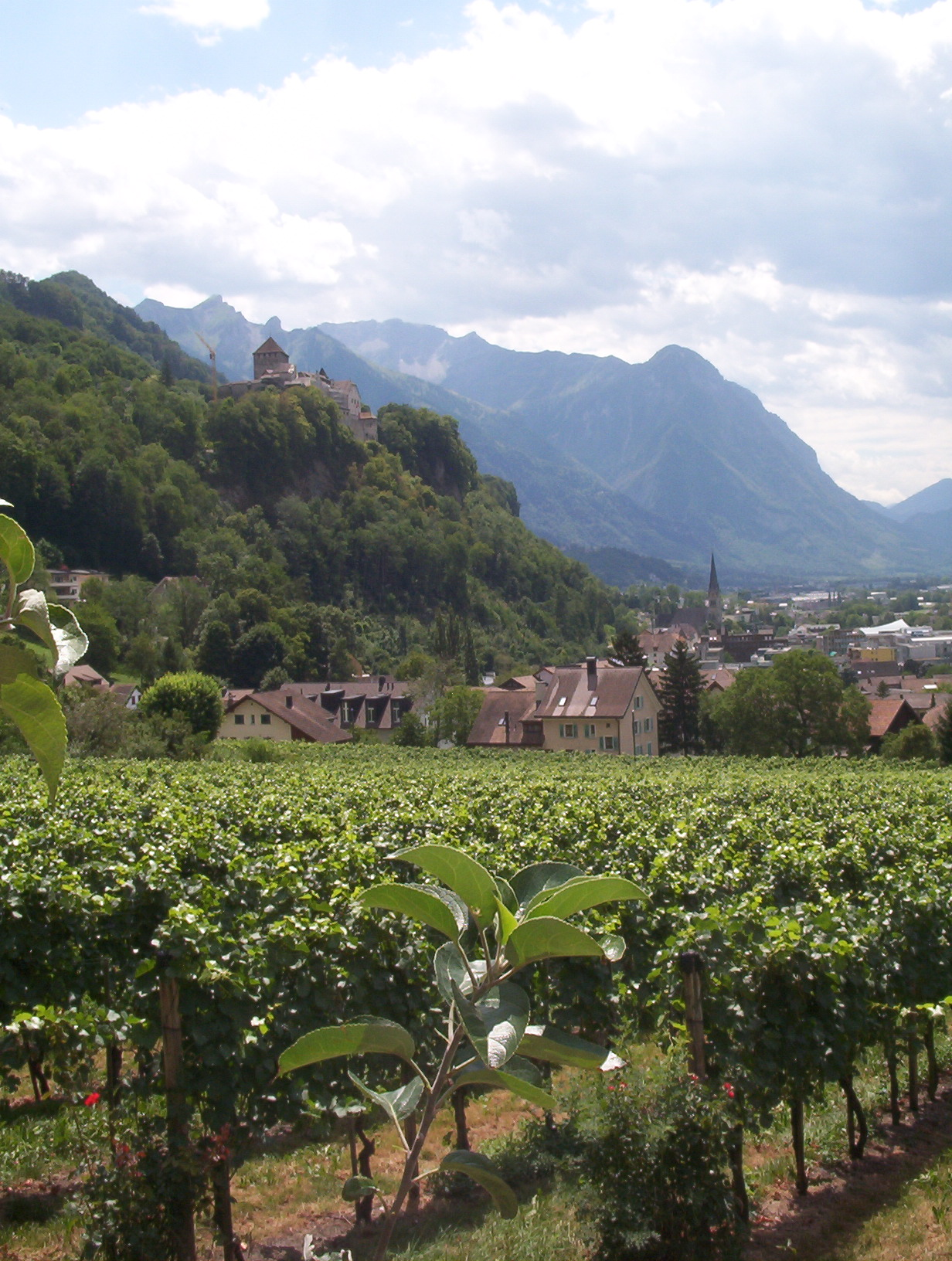
Vineyards near Vaduz

During the latter half of the 19th century, wine was one of Liechtenstein's two main exports, alongside cattle. The wine industry in Liechtenstein reached an all-time peak in 1871 when 320 hectares (790 acres) were designated for wine production. After this point however, the opening of the Arlberg railway saw an increase in foreign competition and in the first half of the 20th century bad harvests and parasites caused the wine industry collapse. Attempts by the government to sustain the industry by introducing compulsory crop spraying after 1890 failed. However, although the industry had declined significantly, viniculture was still important enough in Vaduz that its coat of arms, established on 31 July 1932, pictured bunches of grapes. Since the 1970s there has been a regrowth of viniculture, but as of 2008 only 26 hectares (64 acres) is under cultivation.

Today, the most popular white wines are Chardonnay, Riesling x Sylvaner, and Gewürztraminer, while red wines most produced are Blauburgunder, Zweigelt, and Blaufränkisch. The highest vineyard in the country is the Walser village of Triesenberg at 850 meters (2800 ft), which has seen some successful experimental growth of the French Léon Millot grape variety. Other notable brands are the Zweigelt Selektion Karlsberg Profundo and the FL Premier Brut 1996, a vintage sparkling wine, pressed from Rhine Riesling grapes.

Several places in the country have wine tasting venues. Most notable is the "Hofkellerei des regierenden Fürsten von Liechtenstein", the wine cellars of the Prince of Liechtenstein.

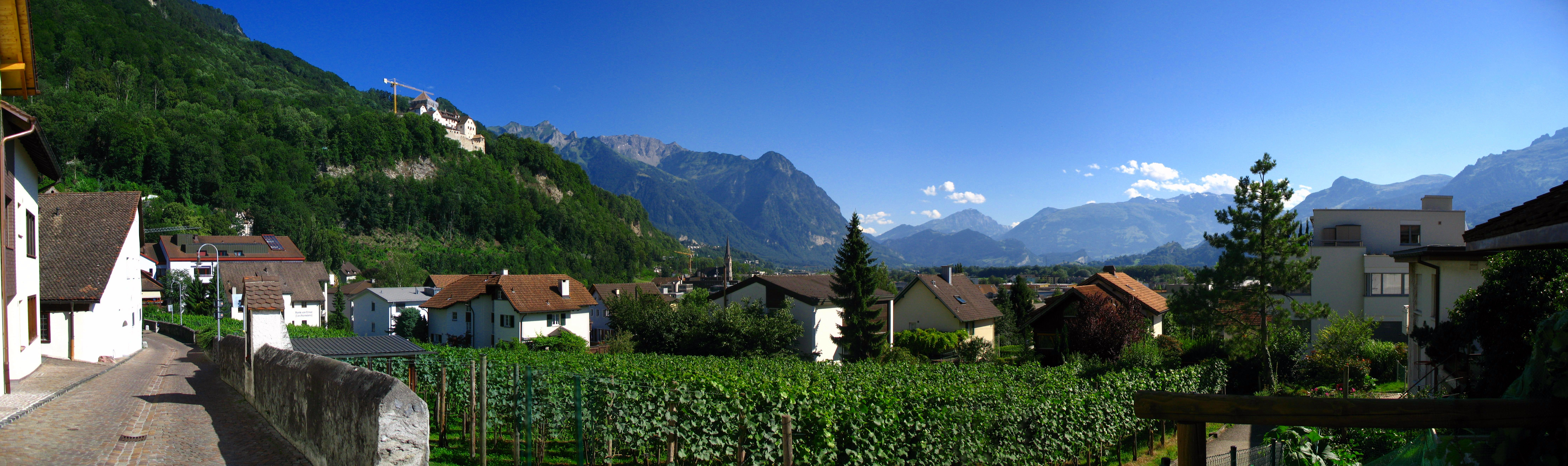

== See also ==
- Winemaking
- Swiss wine
