= Rail transport in Liechtenstein =

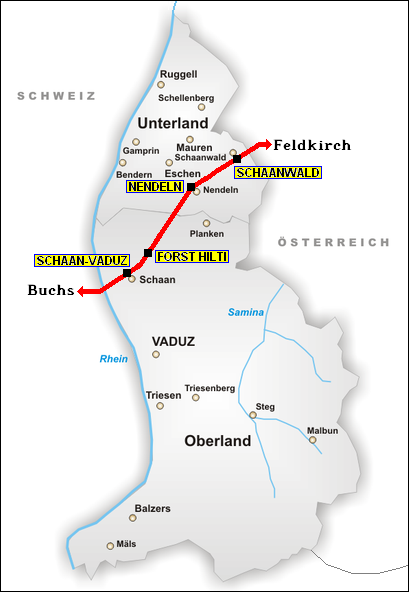
A map of Liechtenstein showing the railway line and the four stations

Liechtenstein's one railway line, the Feldkirch–Buchs railway, is operated by Austrian Federal Railways (ÖBB). As such, it represents an exception to the more usual Liechtenstein practice of cooperating closely with Switzerland, as in the case of the principality's use of the Swiss franc as its currency and its membership of a common customs area with its western neighbour.

The railway line carries international services between Austria and Switzerland, most of which run non-stop through the principality. Only one local train service stops at three of the four stations located in Liechtenstein. The S2 (or R2 when it skips the stops of Gisingen and Tisis in Feldkirch) of Vorarlberg S-Bahn runs 11 times in each direction a day on Workdays (Monday to Friday excluding Austrian Holidays) connecting Buchs SG to Feldkirch. In addition, there are 9 long-distance international trains that pass through Liechtenstein without stopping (Railjet, EuroCity). The line is also used to transport freight.

Plans have been made to double-track this rail line, however, efforts have stalled after the loan to pay for its construction was rejected by a local referendum in 2020. This would have allowed some long-distance international trains to stop at Nendeln station.

== System ==
The rail system of Liechtenstein is small, consisting of one line connecting Austria and Switzerland through Liechtenstein of 9.5 km (5.9 mi). This line links Feldkirch, Austria, and Buchs, Switzerland. It is electrified using the standard system used in both Austria and Switzerland (15 kV with overhead wiring).

== Railway stations ==
Liechtenstein has only three railway stations currently in service on the Feldkirch-Buchs line and one station which is disused.

Currently in operation:

- Schaan-Vaduz (located in Schaan, also serving Vaduz)
- Forst Hilti (located at the headquarters of Hilti, in the northern suburb of Schaan)
- Nendeln (located in Nendeln, a civil parish of Eschen)

These stations are served by a limited number of stopping services between Feldkirch, Austria, and Buchs, Switzerland, provided by the S2 of Vorarlberg S-Bahn: four to five trains each way in the early morning and late afternoon on Mondays to Fridays only. Whilst Railjet and other long-distance international trains also make use of the route, they do not call at the stations in Liechtenstein.

Disused:

- Schaanwald (located in Schaanwald, a civil parish of Mauren)

The station opened in 1902. It was staffed until 1988. Over time the number of trains stopping at the station diminished considerably. From 2010 until 2012 only one train per day stopped here. From 2013 the station has no longer been served.

== Bus links ==
Most public transport in Liechtenstein is bus-operated, including links from Buchs and Sargans railway stations in Switzerland to Vaduz. Liechtenstein Bus is the main operator.

== Gallery ==
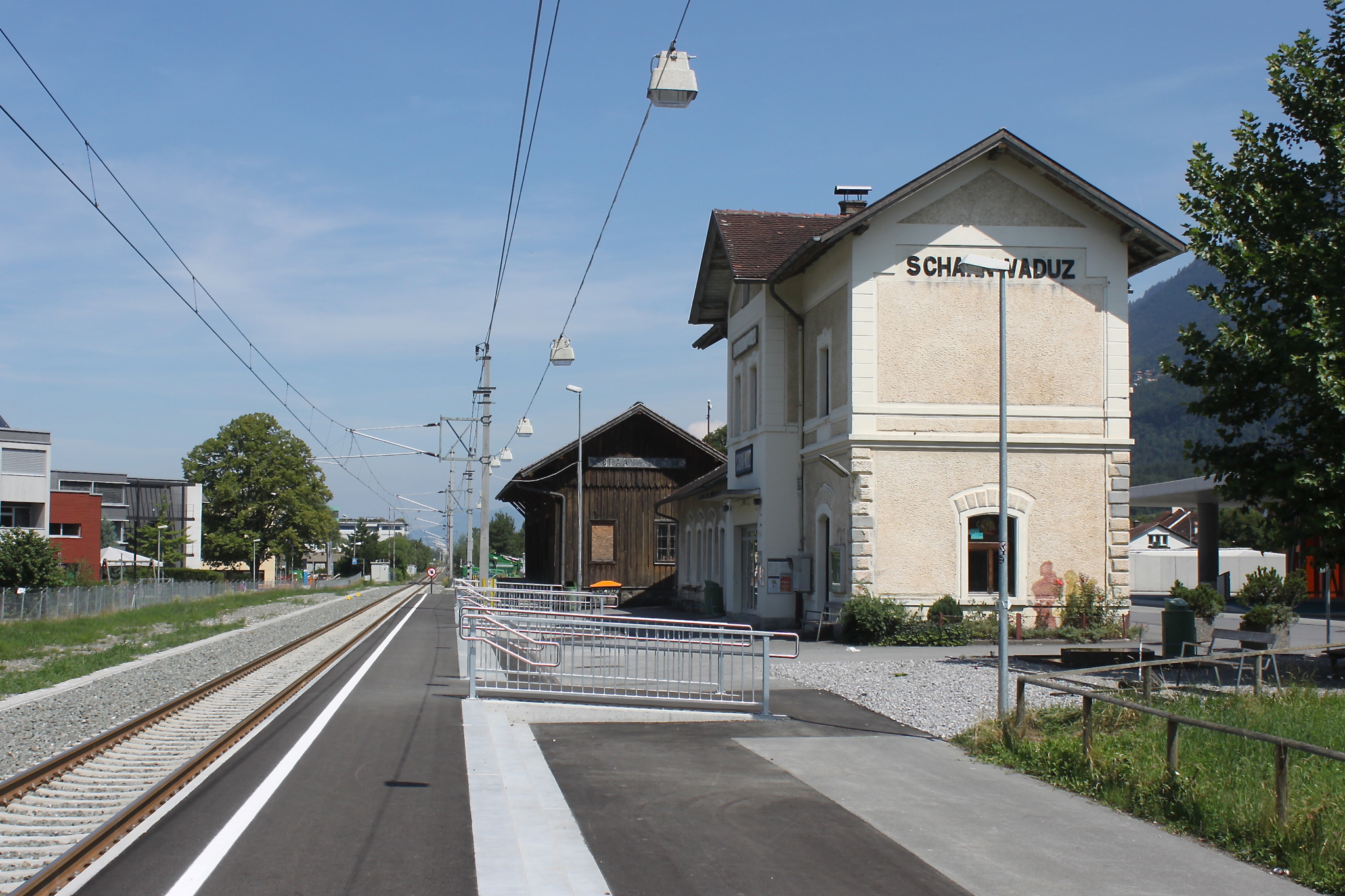
Schaan-Vaduz

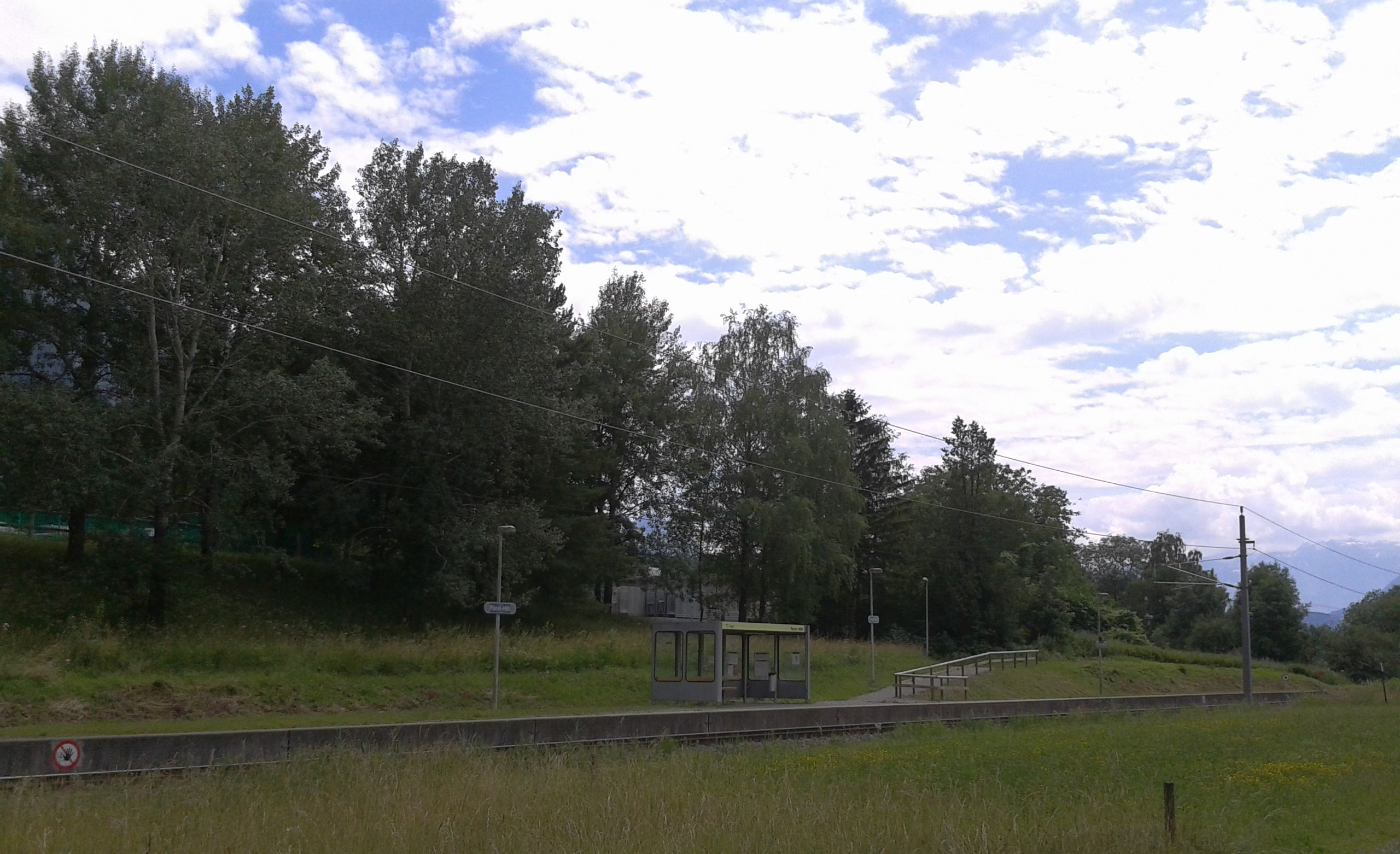
Forst Hilti

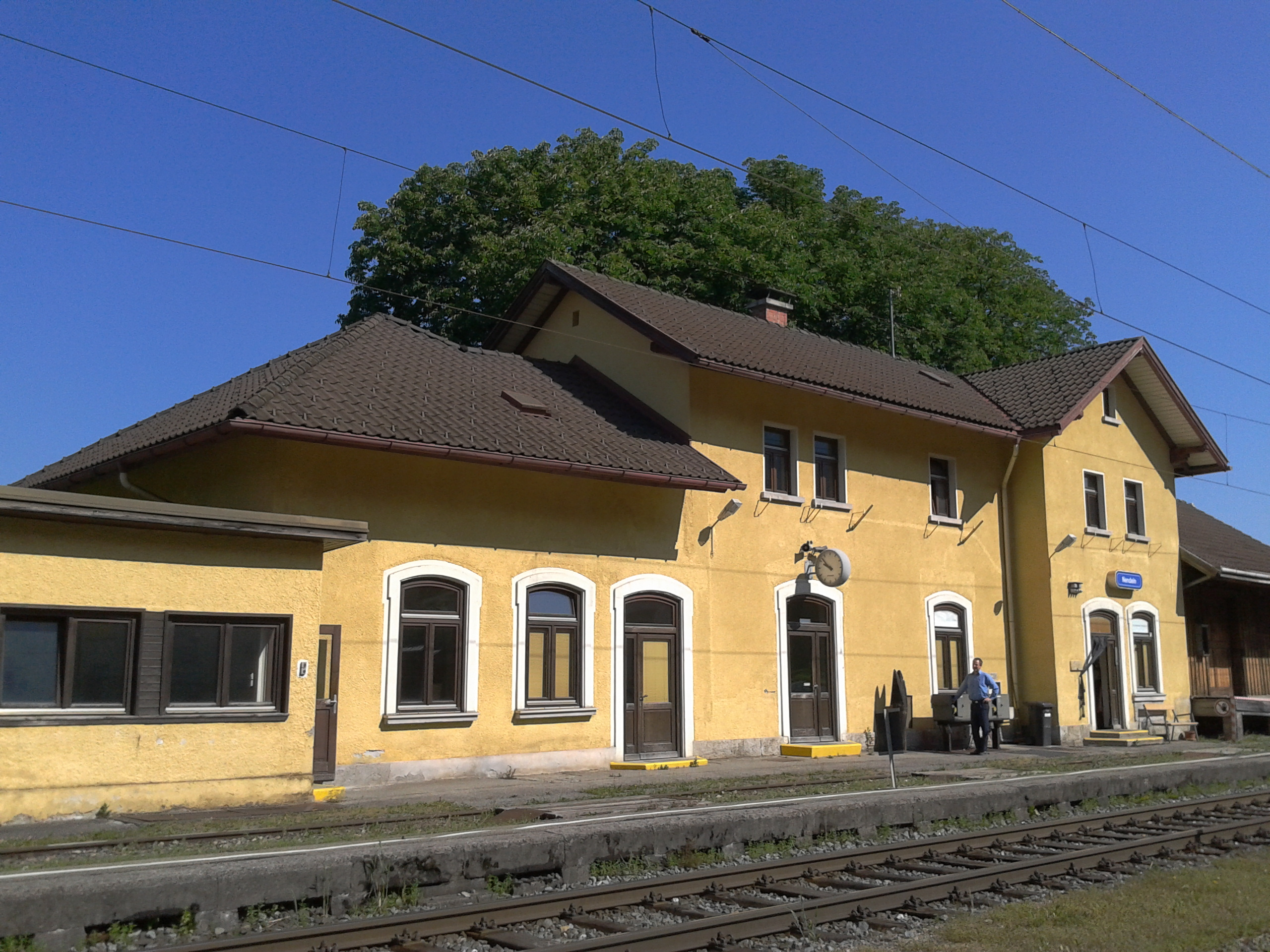
Nendeln

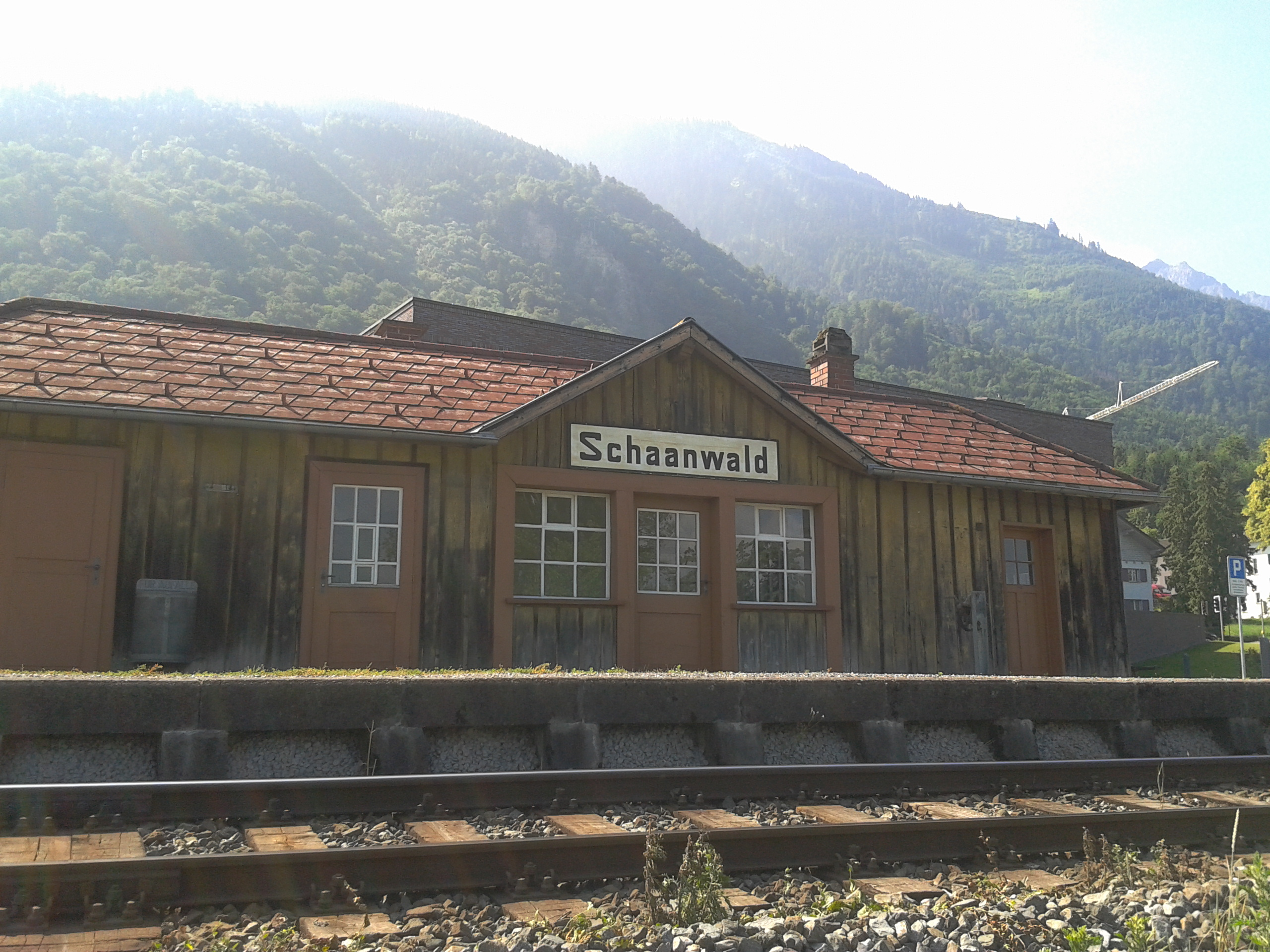
Schaanwald

== See also ==
- Transport in Liechtenstein
- Rail transport in Austria
- Rail transport in Switzerland
