= Nendeln railway station =

Railway station serving Liechtenstein

Nendeln
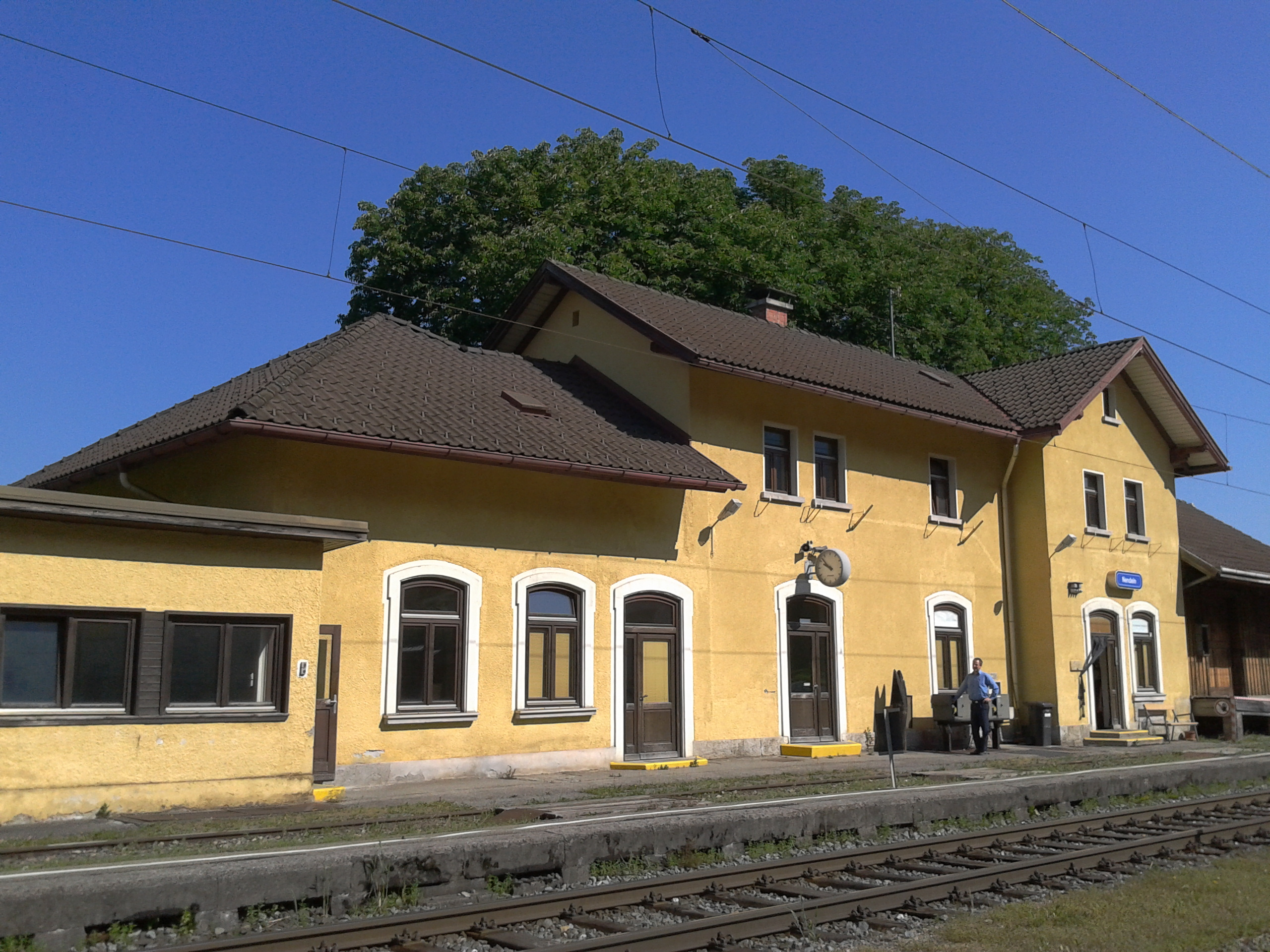

General information
- Location: Sägastrasse 40, 9485 Nendeln; Liechtenstein
- Coordinates: 47.2003°N 9.5408°E
- System: Railway station of Liechtenstein
- Owner: ÖBB
- Line: Feldkirch–Buchs
- Platforms: 2
- Tracks: 3

History
- Opened: 1872

Services
Preceding station	Vorarlberg S-Bahn	Following station
Forst Hilti towards Buchs SG	S2	Tisis towards Feldkirch
Location
- Location within Liechtenstein

Nendeln is one of the four railway stations on the Feldkirch–Buchs railway line serving Liechtenstein. It is located in the village of Nendeln, in Eschen municipality. The station is served by eighteen trains per day, nine in each direction between Austria and Switzerland.

The station is owned and operated by Austrian Federal Railways (ÖBB).

The next station in direction to Feldkirch is Tisis. Until 2013, it used to be Schaanwald, which is now closed.

== Customs ==
When the next station in the direction of Austria (Schaanwald) is not used, which has been the case since 2013, Nendeln is for customs purposes, a border station for passengers arriving from Austria. Liechtenstein is in a customs union with Switzerland. Customs checks may be performed in the station or on board trains by Swiss officials. Systematic passport controls were abolished when Liechtenstein joined the Schengen Area in 2011.

== Services ==
As of the December 2023 timetable change, the following regional train service calls at Nendeln station:

- Vorarlberg S-Bahn S2: on weekdays, eleven trains per day to both Buchs SG and Feldkirch

== Gallery ==
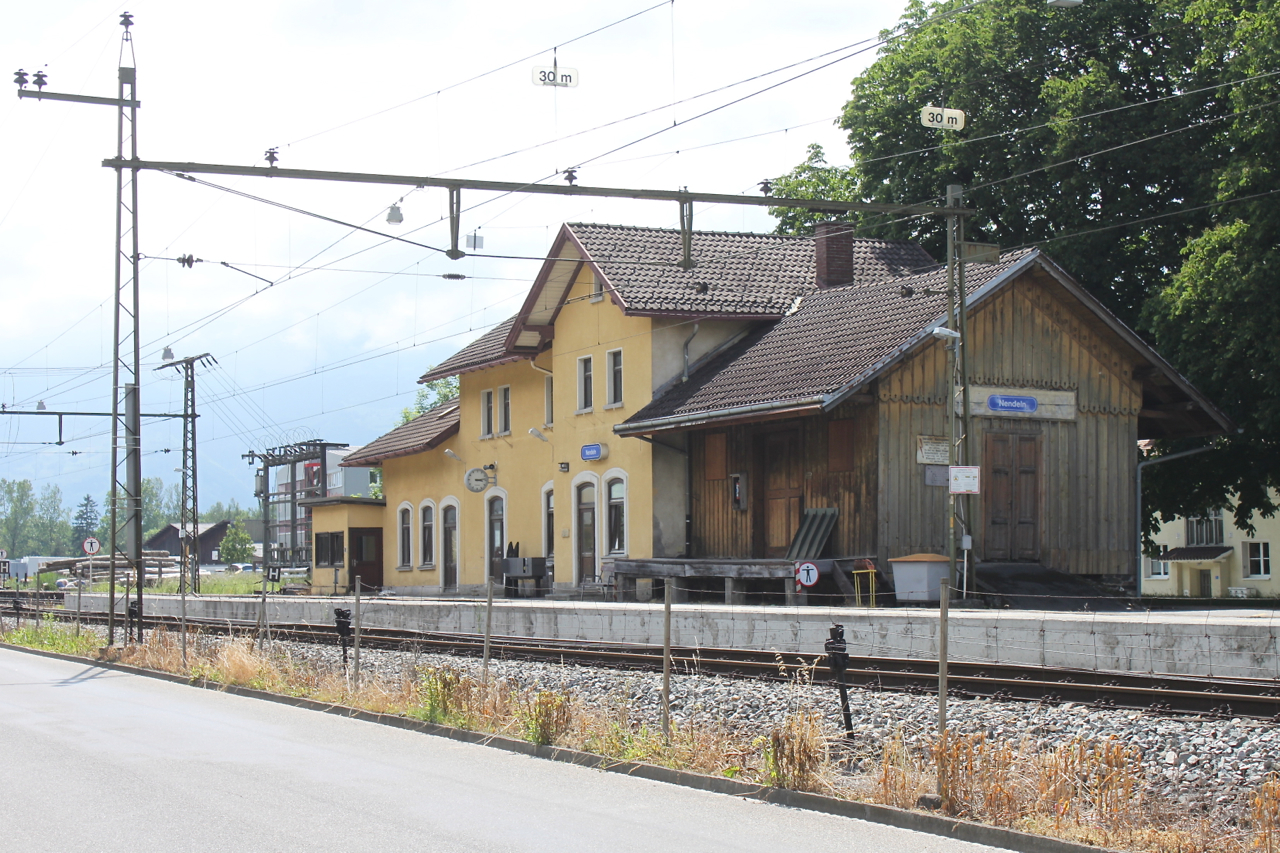
View of the station from the adjacent road

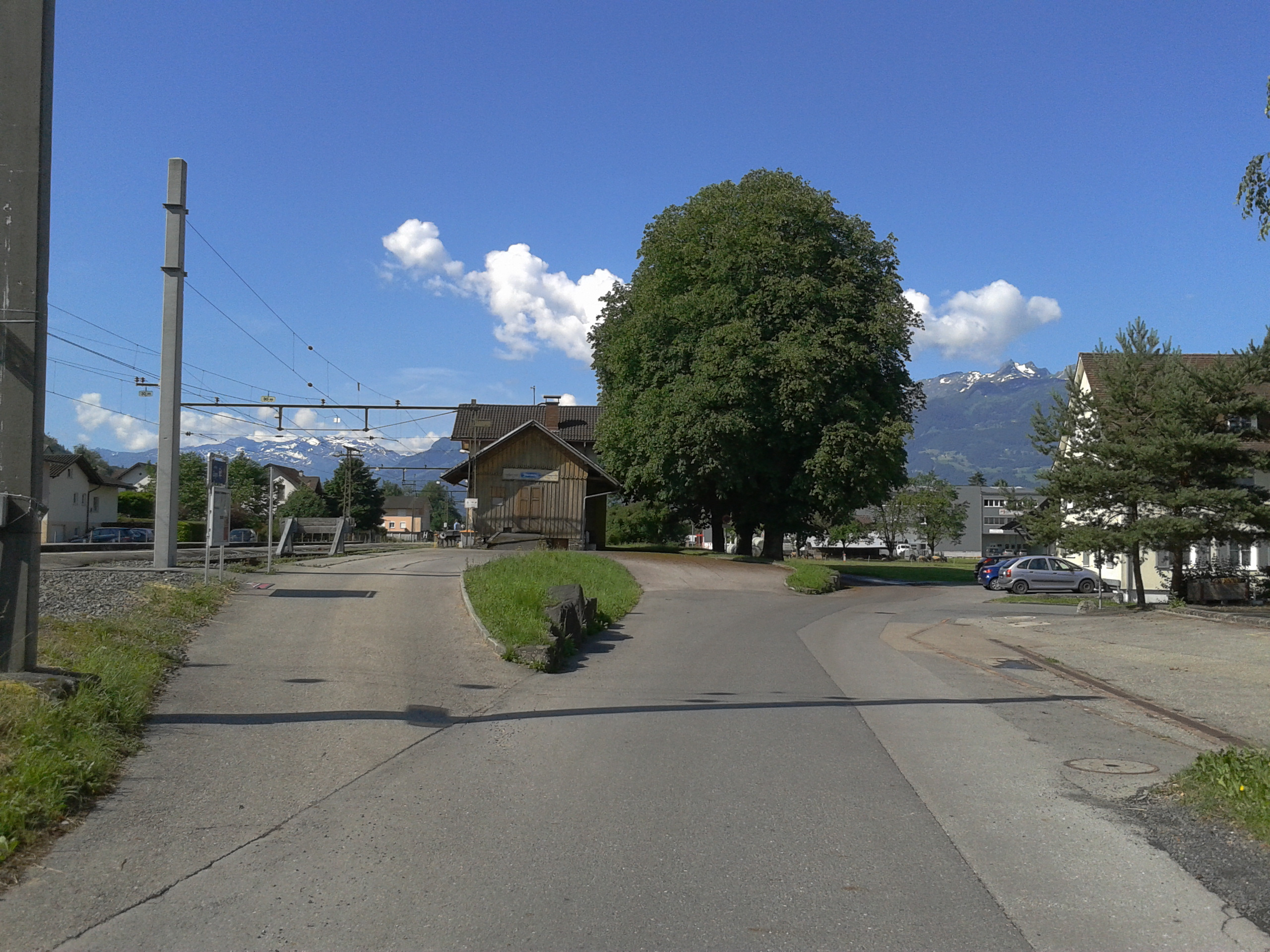
Station entrance

== See also ==
- Schaan-Vaduz railway station
- Forst Hilti railway station
- Schaanwald railway station
- Rail transport in Liechtenstein
- Railway stations in Liechtenstein
