= Feldkirch–Buchs railway =

Railway line linking Austria and Switzerland via Liechtenstein

Feldkirch-Buchs
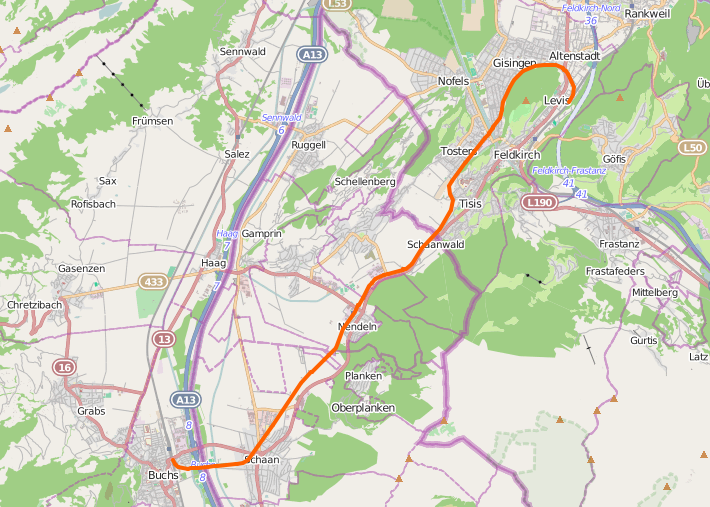
- Map showing the route

Overview
- Line number: 303 01 (ÖBB)

Technical
- Line length: 18.52 km (11.51 mi)
- Track gauge: 1,435 mm
- Electrification: 15 kV 16.7 Hz ~ AC

The Feldkirch–Buchs railway is a 18.52 km (11.51 mi) electrified single track railway line that links Austria and Switzerland passing through Liechtenstein. Owned by the Austrian Federal Railways (ÖBB), it is the only railway line in Liechtenstein.

== History ==
The line opened in 1872 between Switzerland and the Austro-Hungarian Empire, during the opening period of the Vorarlberg Railway, and was electrified in 1926. As of the 2023 timetable change, the line is served by international trains (Railjet, EuroCity) that run non-stop between Feldkirch and Buchs, and the regional train S2 of Vorarlberg S-Bahn that stop at all intermediate stations in Austria and Liechtenstein.

In June 2008, the canton of St. Gallen, the Federal State of Vorarlberg, and the Principality of Liechtenstein signed an agreement for a project to upgrade the line (and the surrounding ones) and to increase the rail traffic. The project, named S-Bahn Liechtenstein was approved by Liechtenstein and Austria in a letter of intent signed in April 2020 and under that plan, it was to be fully realised by 2027 and would have costed an estimated €187 million. That plan was, however, rejected by 62.3% of Liechtenstein voters in a referendum on 30 August 2020.

== Stations ==
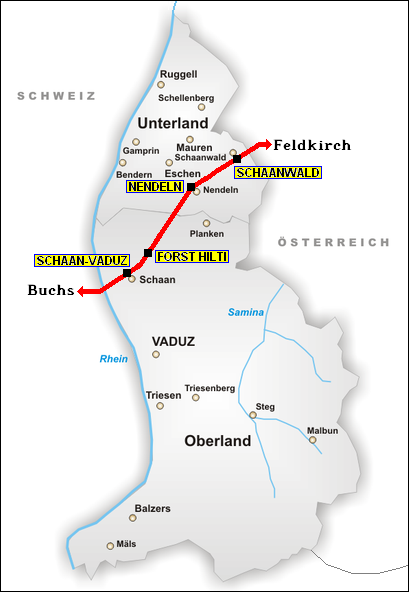
Map

Station	Dist. (km)	Tracks	Location	Country	Notes
Feldkirch	0.00	6	Feldkirch town center (Levis quarter)	Austria	Connections to
Altenstadt	2.13	1	Altenstadt quarter in Feldkirch	Austria	(irregular service)
Gisingen	3.59	1	Gisingen quarter in Feldkirch	Austria	(limited service)
Tisis	7.28	1	Tisis quarter in Feldkirch	Austria	(limited service)
Schaanwald	9.38	1	Schaanwald, a civil parish of Mauren	Liechtenstein	Disused since 2013
Nendeln	11.47	3	Nendeln, a civil parish of Eschen	Liechtenstein	(irregular service)
Forst Hilti	14.12	1	North of Schaan, close to the Hilti AG	Liechtenstein	(irregular service)
Schaan-Vaduz	15.87	2	Schaan, 3.5 km (2.2 mi) from Vaduz	Liechtenstein	(irregular service)
Buchs SG	18.52	5	Buchs	Switzerland	Connections to

== Gallery ==
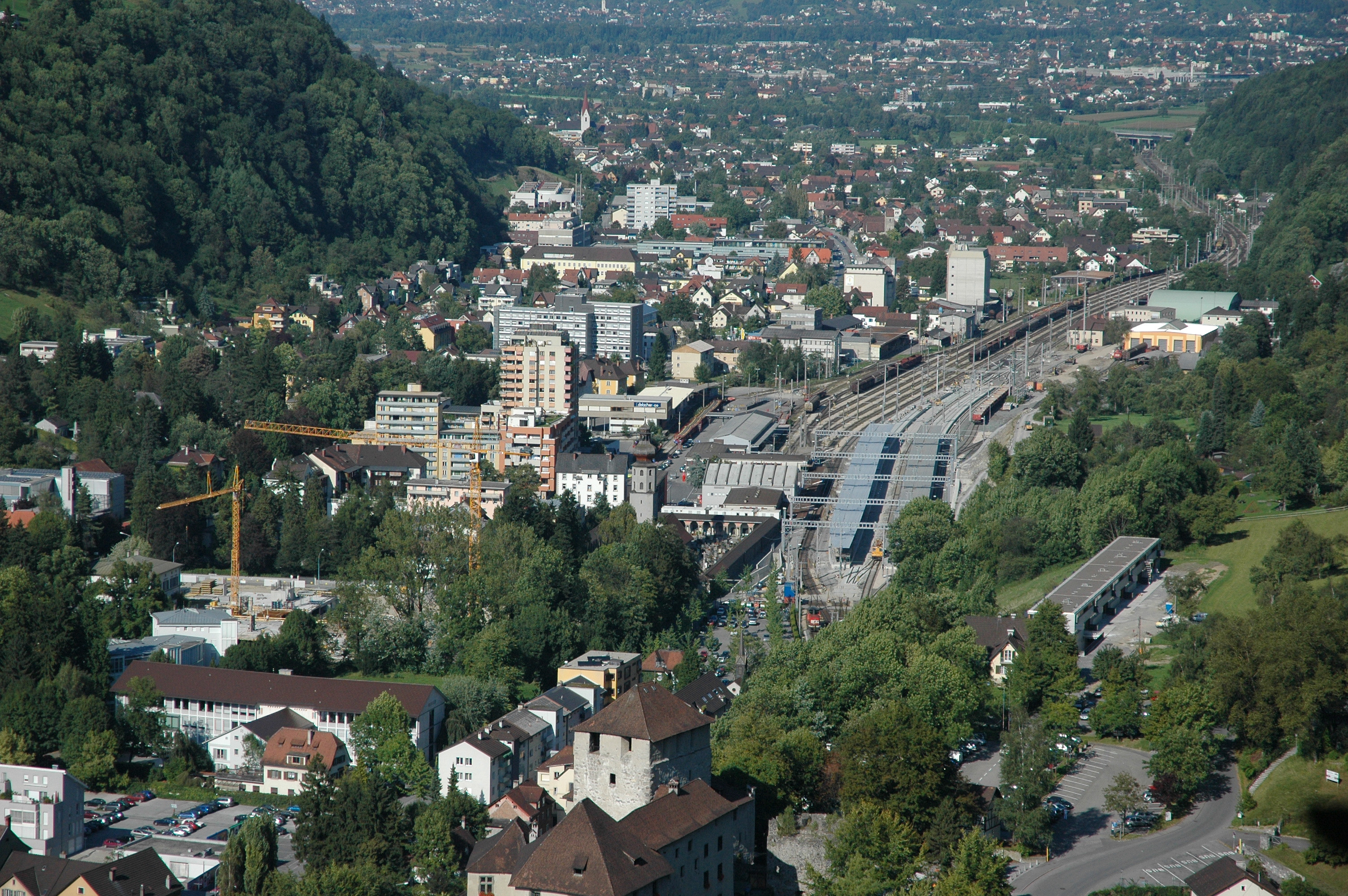
View of Feldkirch town center and its main station

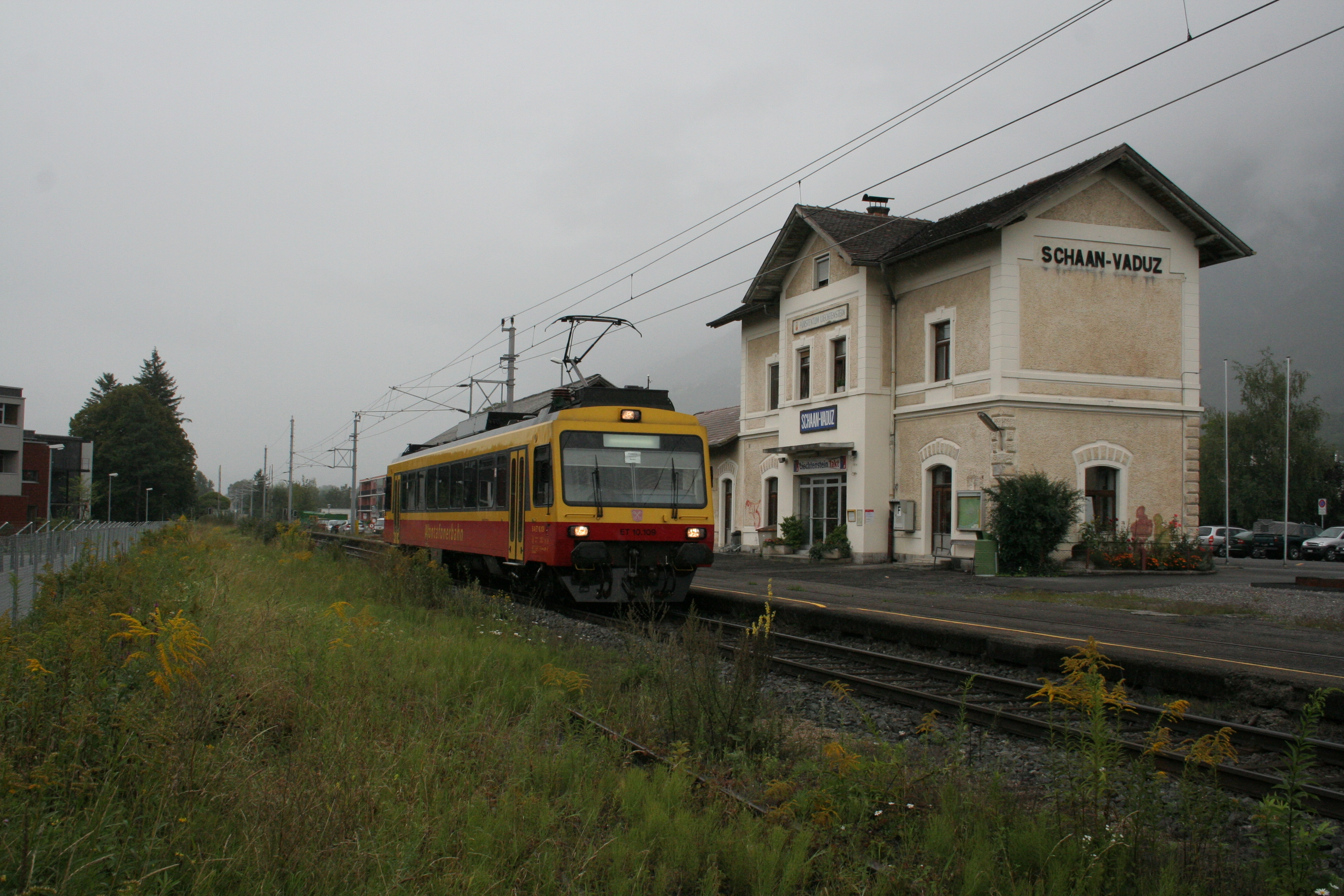
Schaan-Vaduz station

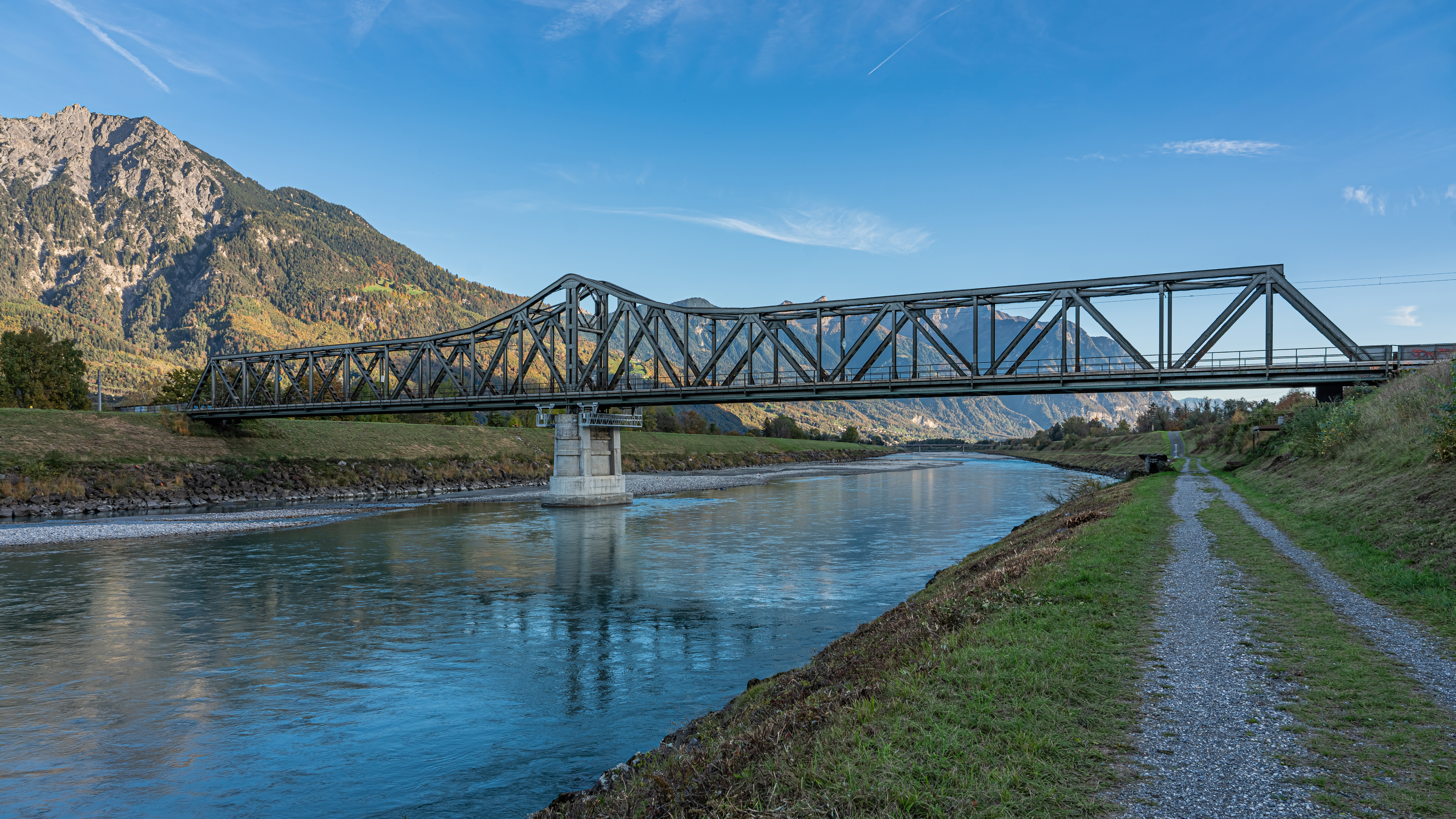
The bridge over the Rhine between Switzerland and Liechtenstein

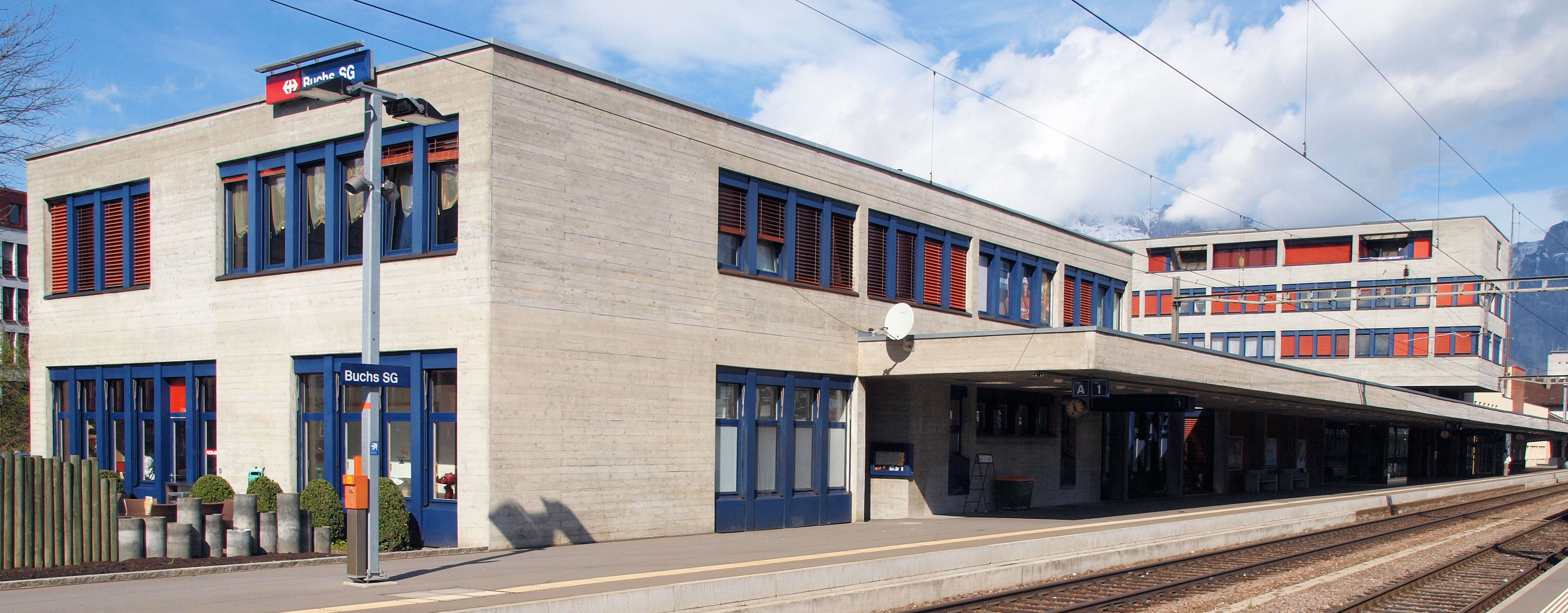
Buchs station

== See also ==
- Rail transport in Austria
- Rail transport in Liechtenstein
