= Forst Hilti railway station =

Railway station serving Liechtenstein

Forst Hilti
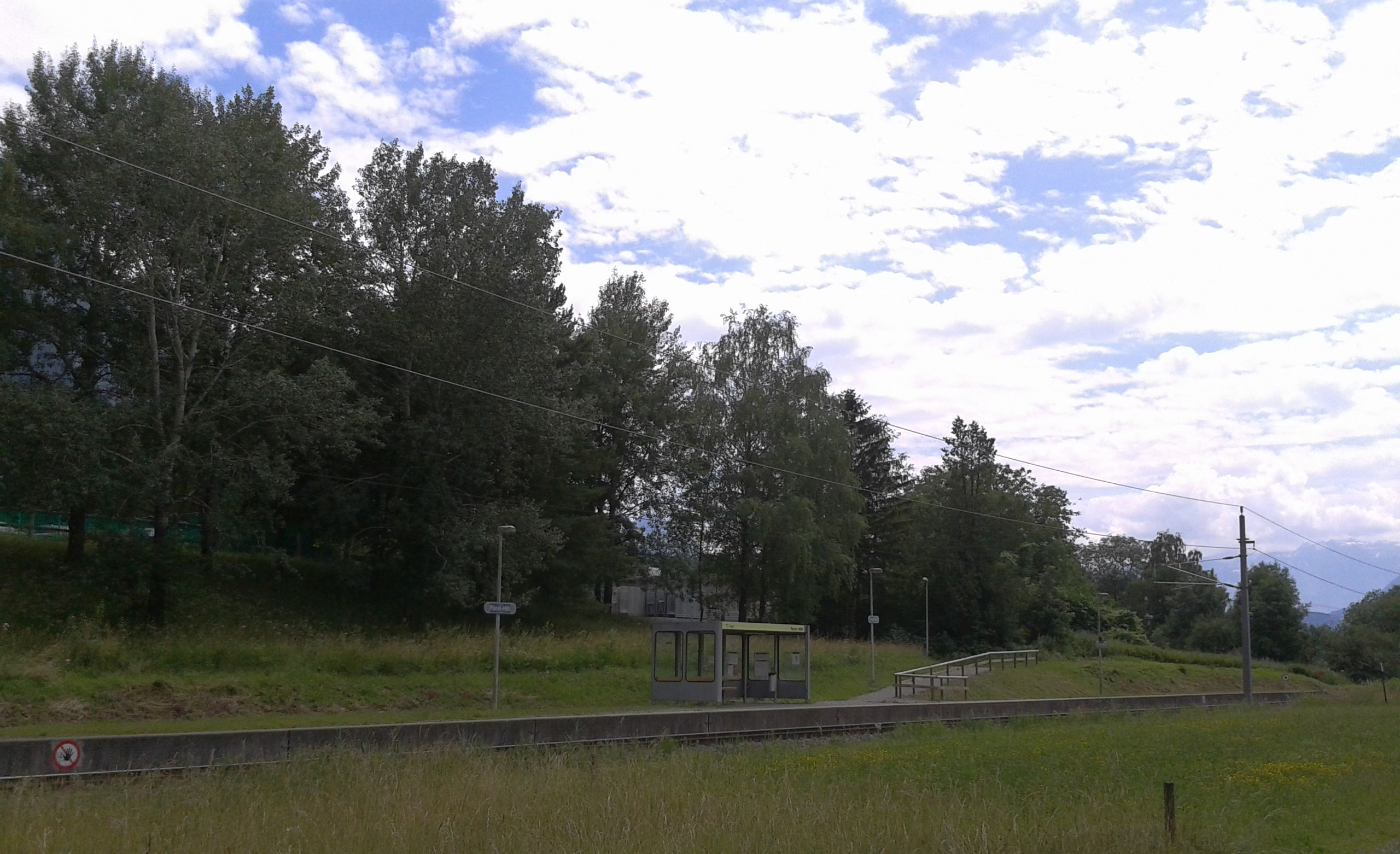

General information
- Location: Hilti Headquarter, 9595 Schaan; Liechtenstein
- Coordinates: 47.1812°N 9.5210°E
- System: Railway station of Liechtenstein
- Owner: ÖBB
- Line: Feldkirch–Buchs
- Platforms: 1
- Tracks: 1

Services
Preceding station	Vorarlberg S-Bahn	Following station
Schaan-Vaduz towards Buchs SG	S2	Nendeln towards Feldkirch
Location
- Location within Liechtenstein

Forst Hilti, also known as Schaan Forst Hilti, is one of four railway stations on the Feldkirch–Buchs railway line serving Liechtenstein. It is located in front of the Hilti Corporation's headquarters, on the outskirts of Schaan. The station is served by 22 trains per day, 11 in each direction between Switzerland and Austria.

The station opened in 2000 and is owned and operated by Austrian Federal Railways (ÖBB).

== Services ==
As of the December 2023 timetable change, the following regional train service calls at Forst Hilti station:

- Vorarlberg S-Bahn S2: on weekdays, eleven trains per day to both Buchs SG and Feldkirch

== See also ==
- Schaan-Vaduz railway station
- Nendeln railway station
- Schaanwald railway station
- Rail transport in Liechtenstein
- Railway stations in Liechtenstein
