= Nendeln =

- Village
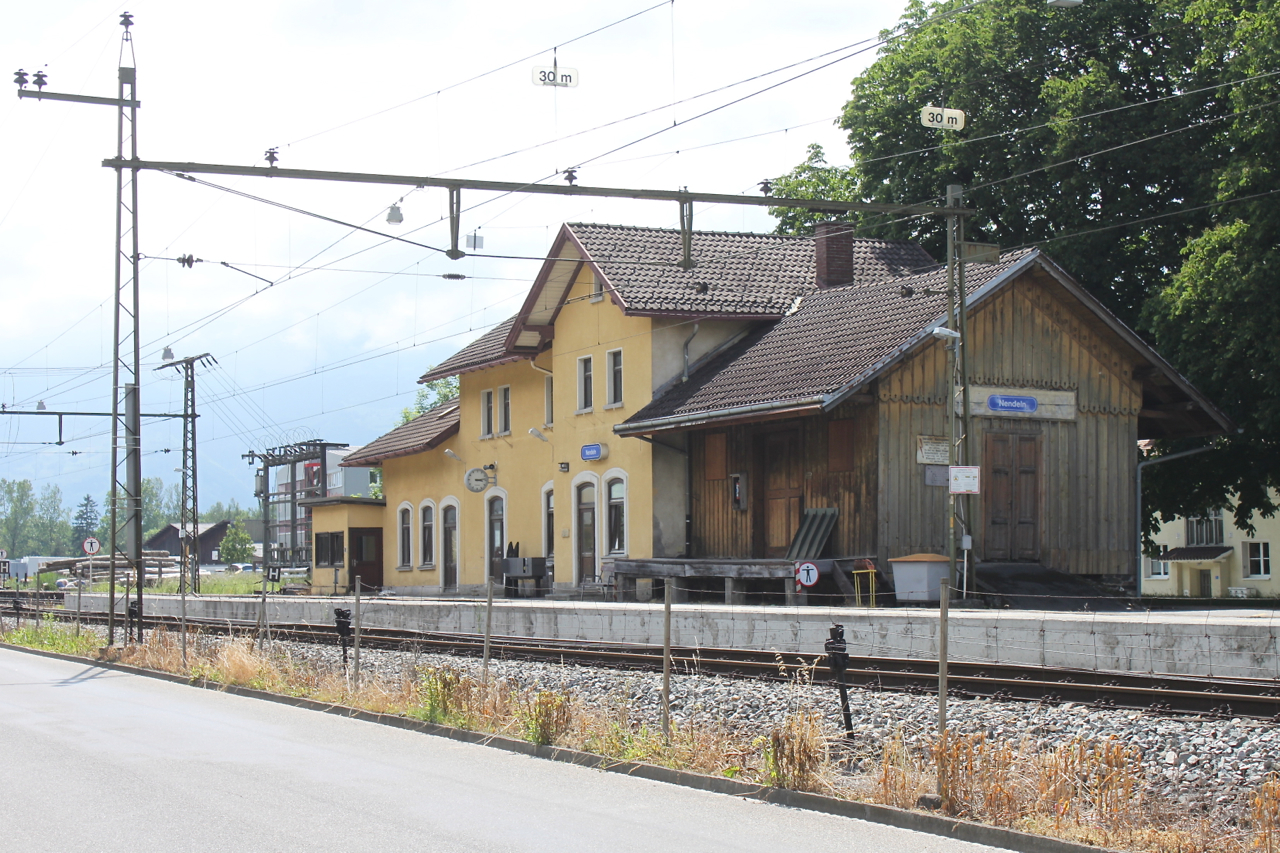
- Nendeln railway station

- Locator map of Nendeln in Liechtenstein
- Coordinates: 47°12′N 9°33′E
- Country: Liechtenstein
- Electoral district: Unterland
- Municipality: Eschen
- Elevation: 450 m (1,480 ft)

Population (2023)
  - Total: 1,407
- Time zone: UTC+1 (CET)
  - Summer (DST): UTC+2 (CEST)
- Postal code: 9485
- Area code: (+423) ...

Nendeln (German pronunciation: [ˈnɛndl̩n]) is a village located in the municipality of Eschen in Liechtenstein. As of 2023, 1,407 people live within Nendeln.

== History ==
Prior to the establishment of the village, the Roman Empire had a presence in the area; villas from that time period have been excavated at Nendeln. The name probably has a Celtic origin.

During the War of the Second Coalition in 1799, the village was burned by invading French troops. It was the starting location of 1939 Liechtenstein putsch, where approximately 40 members of the VBDL began a march towards Vaduz.

== Geography ==
The village is located in north-central Liechtenstein, on the main road Schaan-Schaanwald that links the country with Buchs, Switzerland and Feldkirch, Austria. Villages that are close to Nendeln are Schaanwald, Mauren, Eschen and Planken.

== Transport ==
Nendeln has a railway station on the Feldkirch-Buchs line. The station is served by 22 trains per day, 11 in each direction between Switzerland and Austria. When the next station in the direction of Austria (Schaanwald) is not used, which has been the case since 2013, Nendeln serves as a customs checkpoint, a border station for passengers arriving from Austria. Liechtenstein is in a customs union with Switzerland. Customs checks may be performed in the station or on board trains by Swiss officials. Systematic passport controls were abolished when Liechtenstein joined the Schengen Area in 2011.

== Notable people ==
- Günther Hasler (born 1951), Olympic middle-distance runner
