= Schaan-Vaduz railway station =

Railway station serving Liechtenstein

Schaan-Vaduz
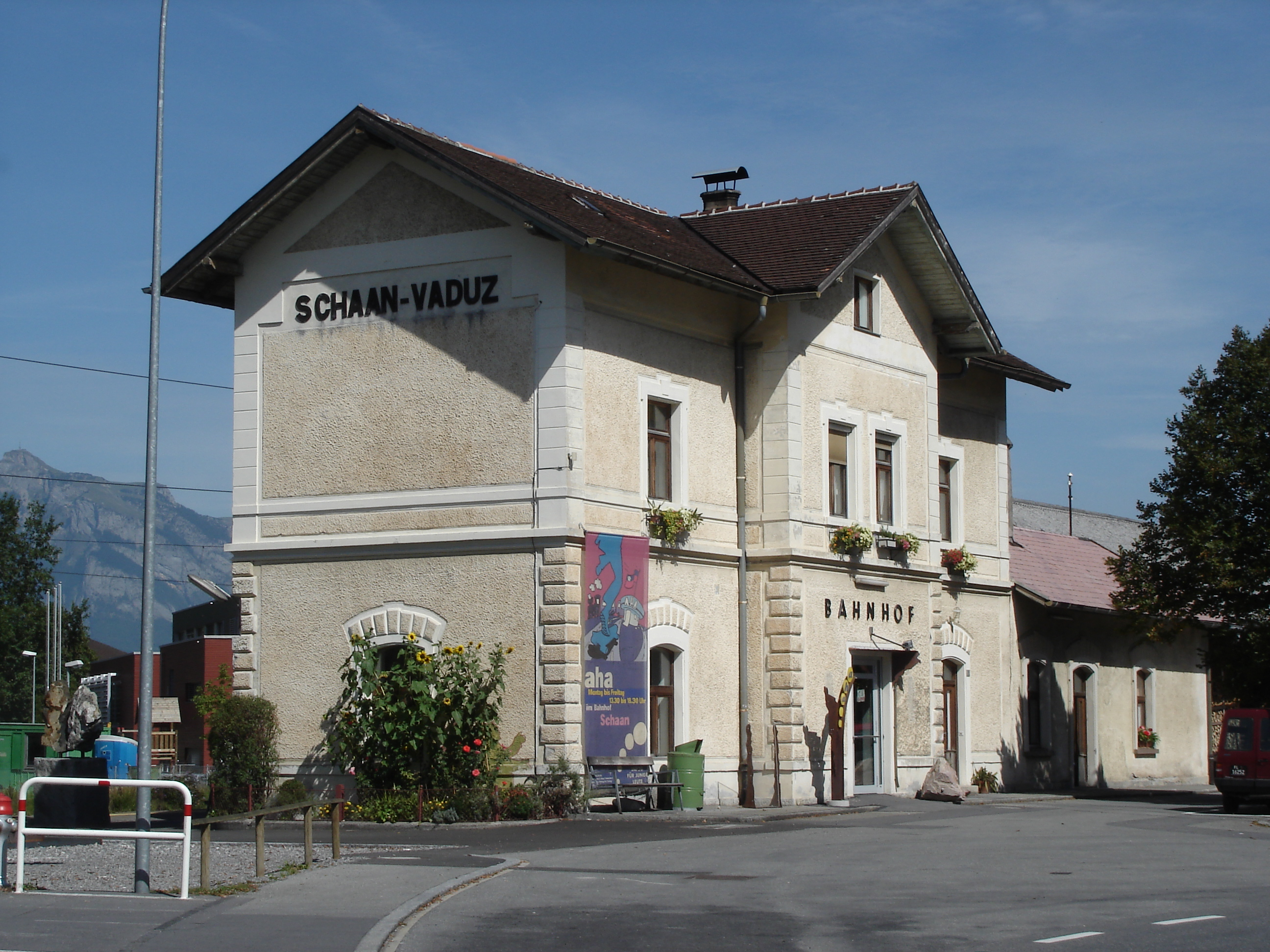

General information
- Location: Postplatz 5, 9595 Schaan; Liechtenstein
- Coordinates: 47°10′07″N 9°30′30″E
- System: Railway station of Liechtenstein
- Owner: ÖBB
- Line: Feldkirch–Buchs
- Platforms: 1
- Tracks: 2

Construction
- Structure type: at-grade
- Parking: yes
- Accessible: yes

History
- Opened: 1872

Services
Preceding station	Vorarlberg S-Bahn	Following station
Buchs SG Terminus	S2	Forst Hilti towards Feldkirch
Location
- Location within Liechtenstein

Schaan-Vaduz is one of the four train stations serving Liechtenstein, located in the town of Schaan, 3.5 km (2.2 mi) from Vaduz. It is owned by the Austrian Federal Railways (ÖBB). The station is served by 22 trains per day, 11 in each direction between Switzerland and Austria.

The station is owned and operated by Austrian Federal Railways (ÖBB).

== Overview ==
Schaan-Vaduz is situated on the international and electrified Feldkirch-Buchs line, between the station of Buchs SG (in Switzerland) and the stop of Forst Hilti (in the northern suburb of Schaan). It is served only by regional trains.

Located in the middle of town, the station is composed of a two-storey building, a wooden shed and a platform serving the first track. The second track has no platform and is rarely used. Located on the platform is the remnants of a rail line, part of a dismantled track system used by freight wagons.

== Services ==
As of the December 2023 timetable change, the following regional train service calls at Schaan-Vaduz station:

- Vorarlberg S-Bahn S2: on weekdays, eleven trains per day to both Buchs SG and Feldkirch

== Gallery ==
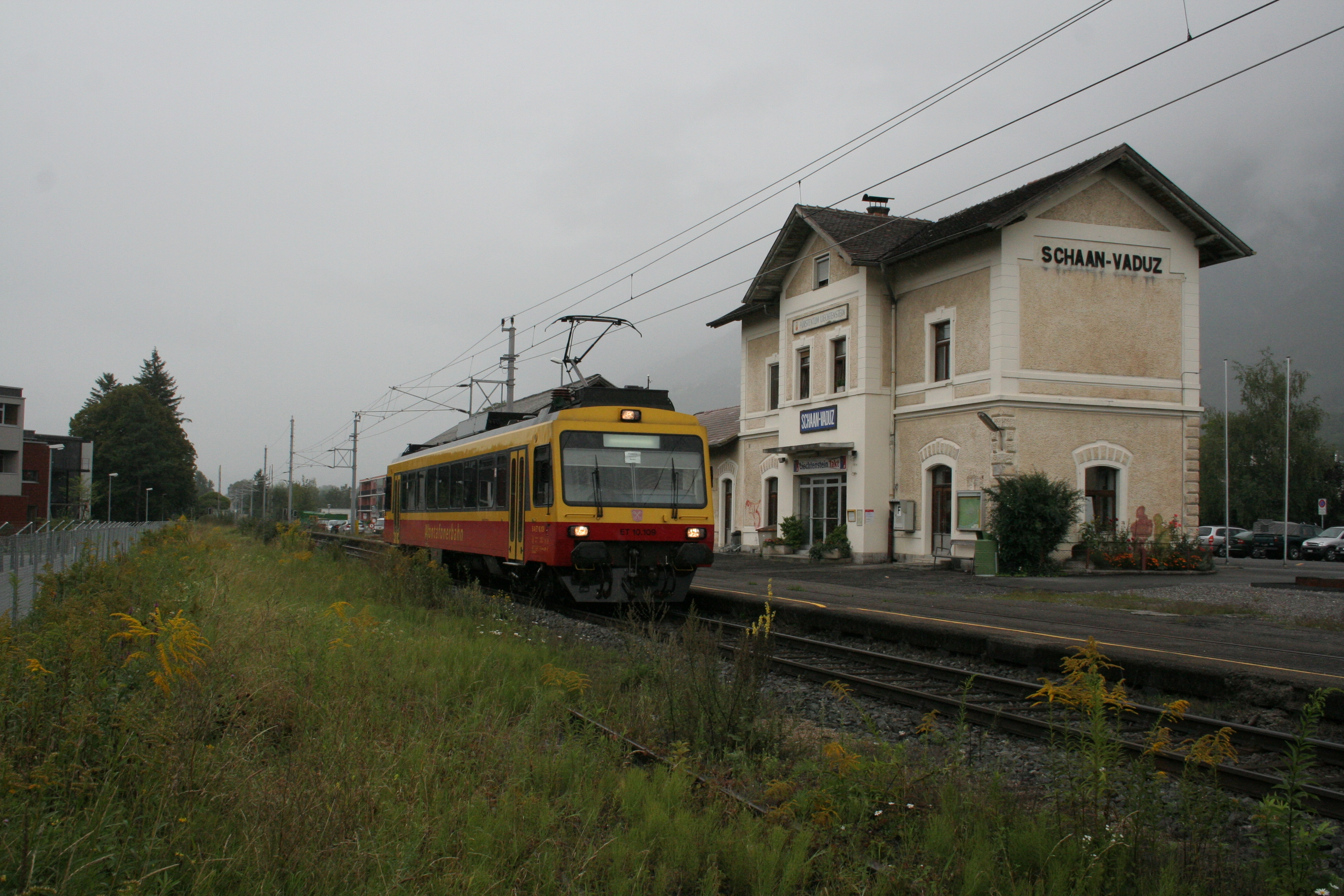
A Montafonerbahn train in Schaan-Vaduz

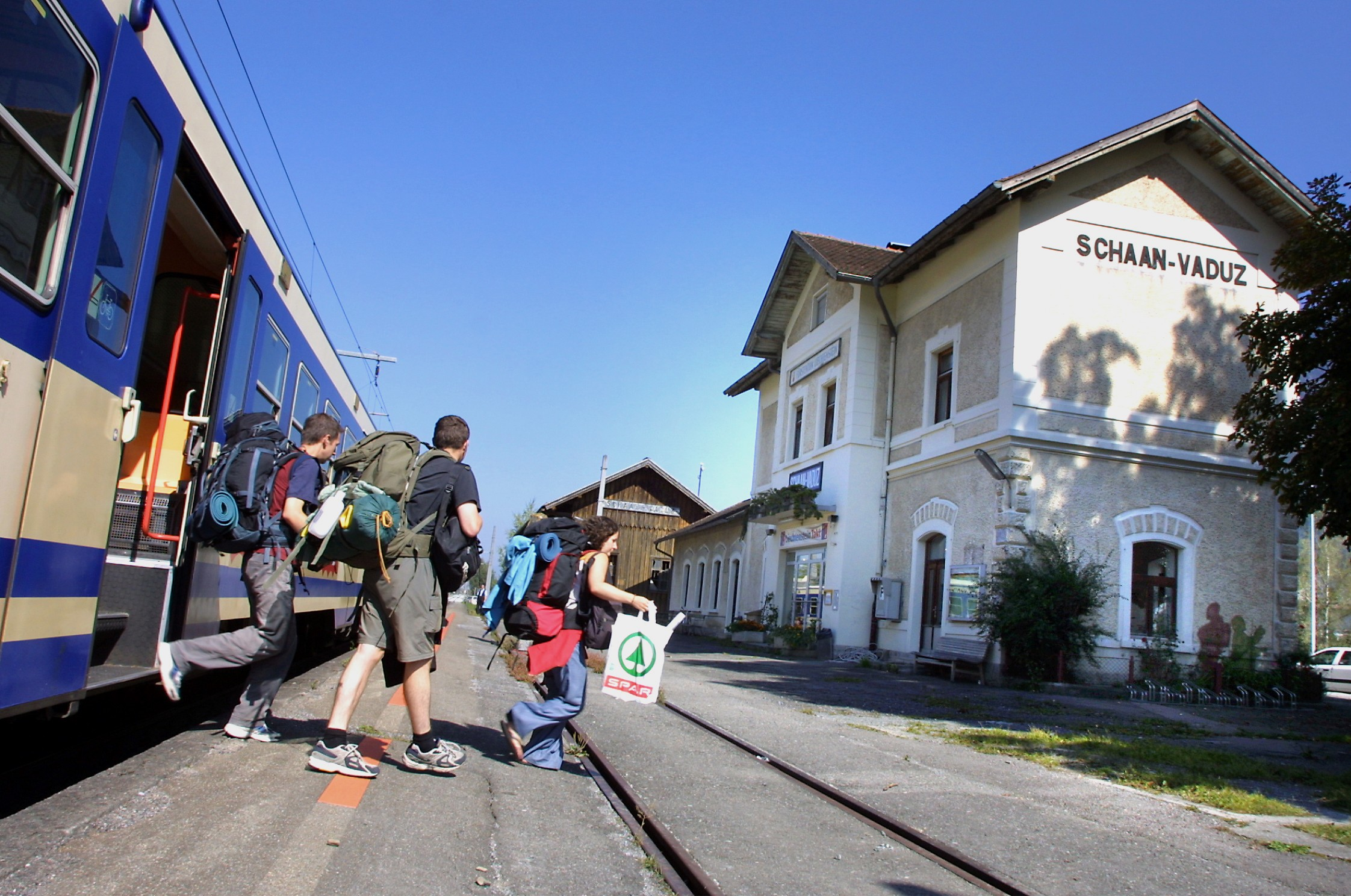
Platform side. In background, the goods depot

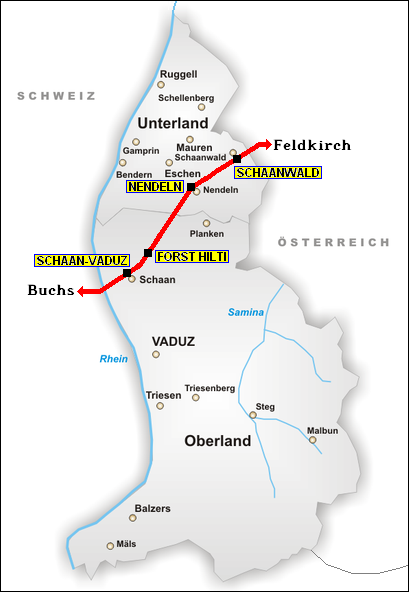
Feldkirch–Buchs railway line and stations in Liechtenstein

== See also ==
- Forst Hilti railway station
- Nendeln railway station
- Schaanwald railway station
- Rail transport in Liechtenstein
- Railway stations in Liechtenstein
