= LIEmobil =

State-owned bus company in Liechtenstein

Verkehrsbetrieb LIECHTENSTEINmobil
- Trade name: LIEmobil
- Type: Bus services
- Founded: As Liechtenstein Bus in 2000; rebranded as LIEmobil on 1 January 2012
- Area served: Whole of Liechtenstein and adjacent parts of Austria and Switzerland
- Revenue: 5.7 million CHF (2024)
- Number of employees: 100 bus drivers, 12 office workers
- Website: liemobil.li/de

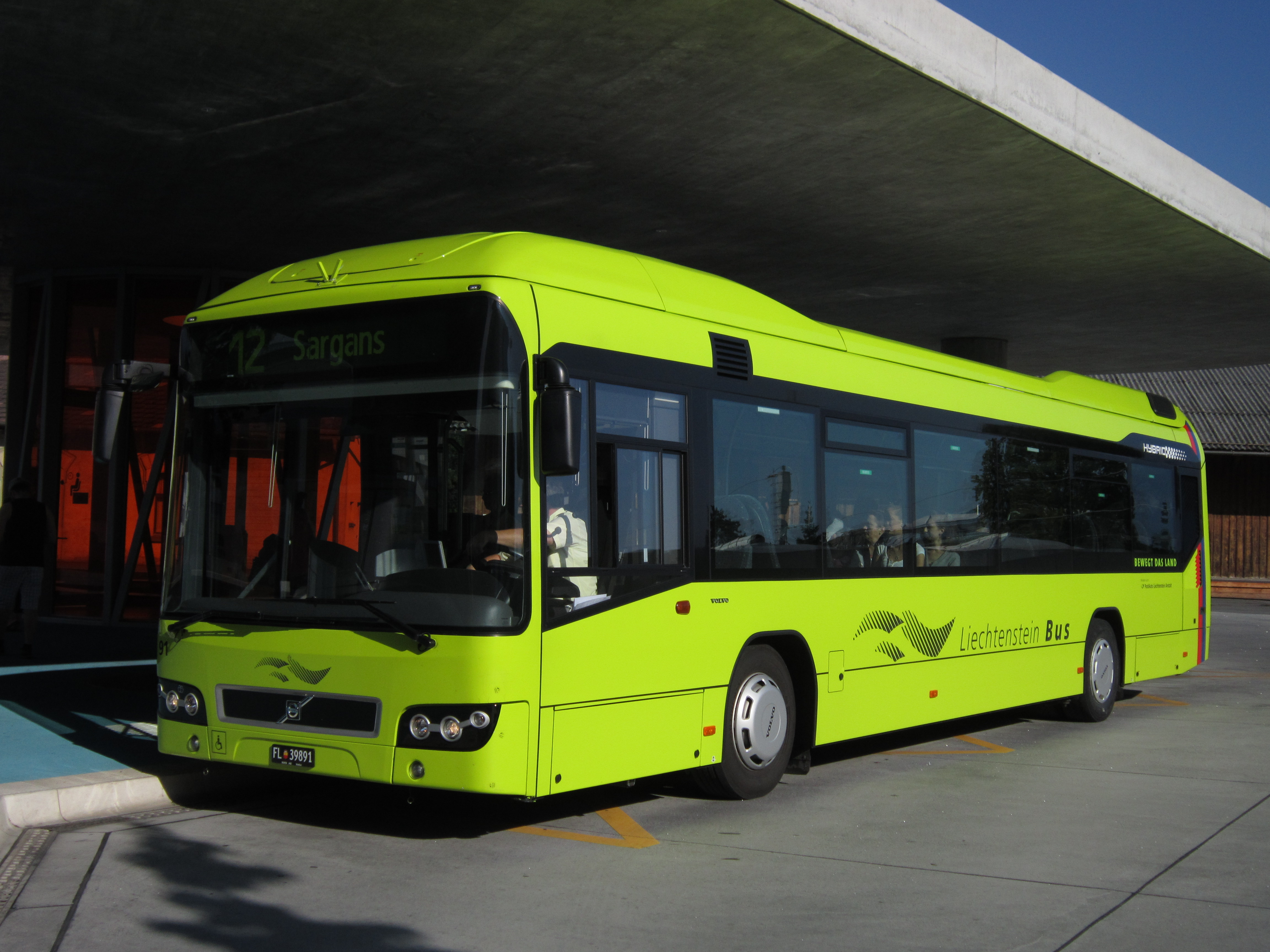
Volvo 7700 Hybrid at Schaan-Vaduz railway station in July 2013

Verkehrsbetrieb LIECHTENSTEINmobil, trading as LIEmobil, is a state-owned bus company in Liechtenstein. It operates the country's primary public transport network, with cross-border routes to neighbouring Austria and Switzerland. Founded in 2000, it was originally known as Liechtenstein Bus Anstalt, or just Liechtenstein Bus, before rebranding in 2012.

== History ==
The first bus service in Liechtenstein began operations on 15 March 1922. The Liechtenstein state established the publicly owned Liechtenstein Bus Anstalt (traded as Liechtenstein Bus) in 2000, which rebranded as LIEmobil on 1 January 2012. Verkehrsbetrieb LIECHTENSTEINmobil was registered as a legally independent institution on the day of the rebrand.

In 2024, LIEmobil recorded its highest yearly number of passengers at 6 million, generating its highest yearly revenue of 5.7 million Swiss francs. This represented a 6.3 percent increase from 2023 and a budget surplus, allowing the company to cover 32.9 percent of its operating costs – more than what was covered by the Liechenstein government.

LIEmobil received criticism in 2025 for having casino print ads on its busses. Critics pointed out that the state-run bus company ran such ads despite Liechtenstein's Federal Gaming Commission of the Office of Economic Affairs banning the advertising of casinos and other gambling-related topics in the country.

== Services ==
The Liechtenstein government owns LIEmobil, which facilitates countrywide public transport. LIEmobil operates 48 busses on 25 bus routes, including 18 daily bus lines, 4 night bus lines, 2 ski bus lines, and 1 cross-border line. Additionally, it runs the Feldkirch–Buchs regional train.

== Organisation ==
LIEmobil employs 100 bus drivers and has 12 office workers.
