= Schaanwald =

- Village
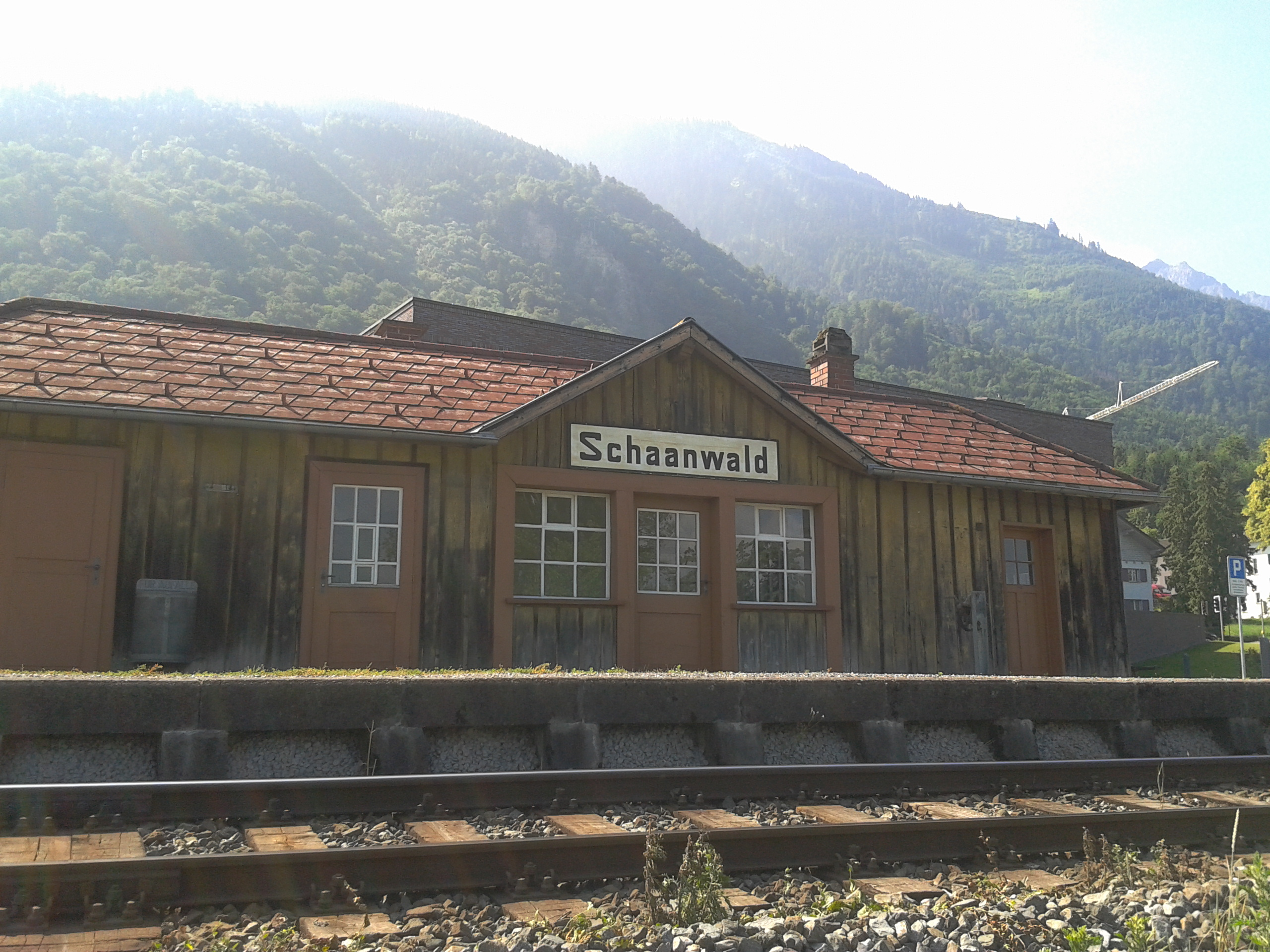
- Schaanwald railway station

- Locator map of Schaanwald in Liechtenstein
- Coordinates: 47°13′N 9°34′E
- Country: Liechtenstein
- Electoral district: Unterland
- Municipality: Mauren
- Elevation: 450 m (1,480 ft)

Population (2003)
  - Total: 1,000 (circa)
- Time zone: UTC+1 (CET)
  - Summer (DST): UTC+2 (CEST)
- Postal code: 9486
- Area code: (+423) ...

Schaanwald (German pronunciation: [ˈʃaːnvalt]) is a village in Liechtenstein, located in the municipality of Mauren.

== History ==
Prior to the establishment of the village, the Roman Empire had a presence here. Villas from that period have been excavated at Schaanwald.

== Geography ==
The village is located in north-central Liechtenstein, close to the Austrian near borders of Feldkirch, on the main road from Schaan that links the country with Buchs (Switzerland) and Feldkirch. The nearest populated areas are Mauren and Nendeln.

== Transport ==
Schaanwald has a train station on the Feldkirch-Buchs line. However, it has not been served since 2013. The station opened in 1902. It was staffed until 1988. Over time, the number of trains stopping at the station diminished considerably. From 2010 until 2012, only one train per day stopped here.

Schaanwald station, when used, is, for customs purposes, a border station for passengers arriving from Austria. Liechtenstein is in a customs union with Switzerland. Customs checks could be performed at the station or on board trains by Swiss officials. Systematic passport controls were abolished when Liechtenstein joined the Schengen Area in 2011.

== Notable people ==
- Melitta Marxer, activist

== Gallery ==
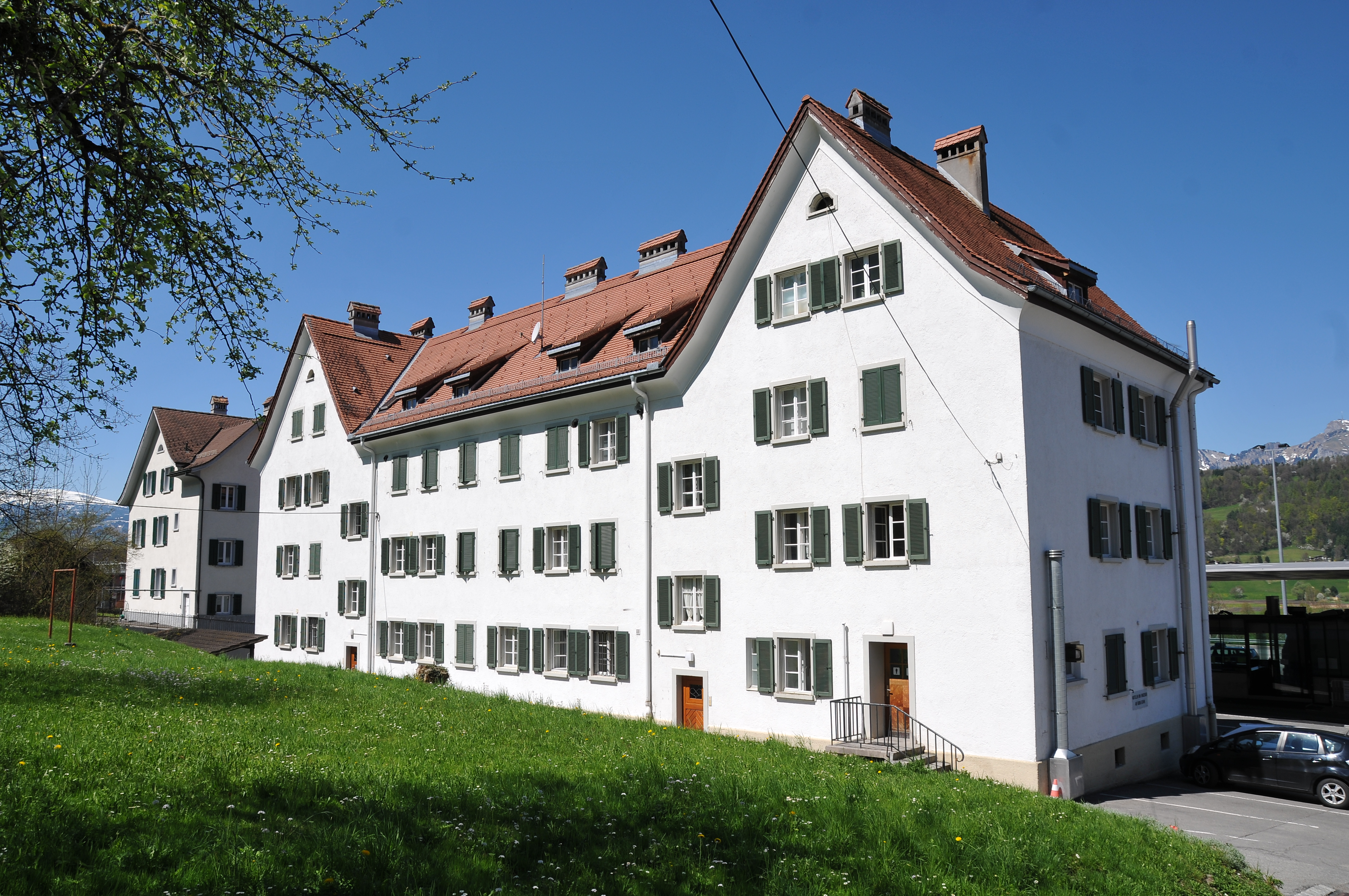
Customs building

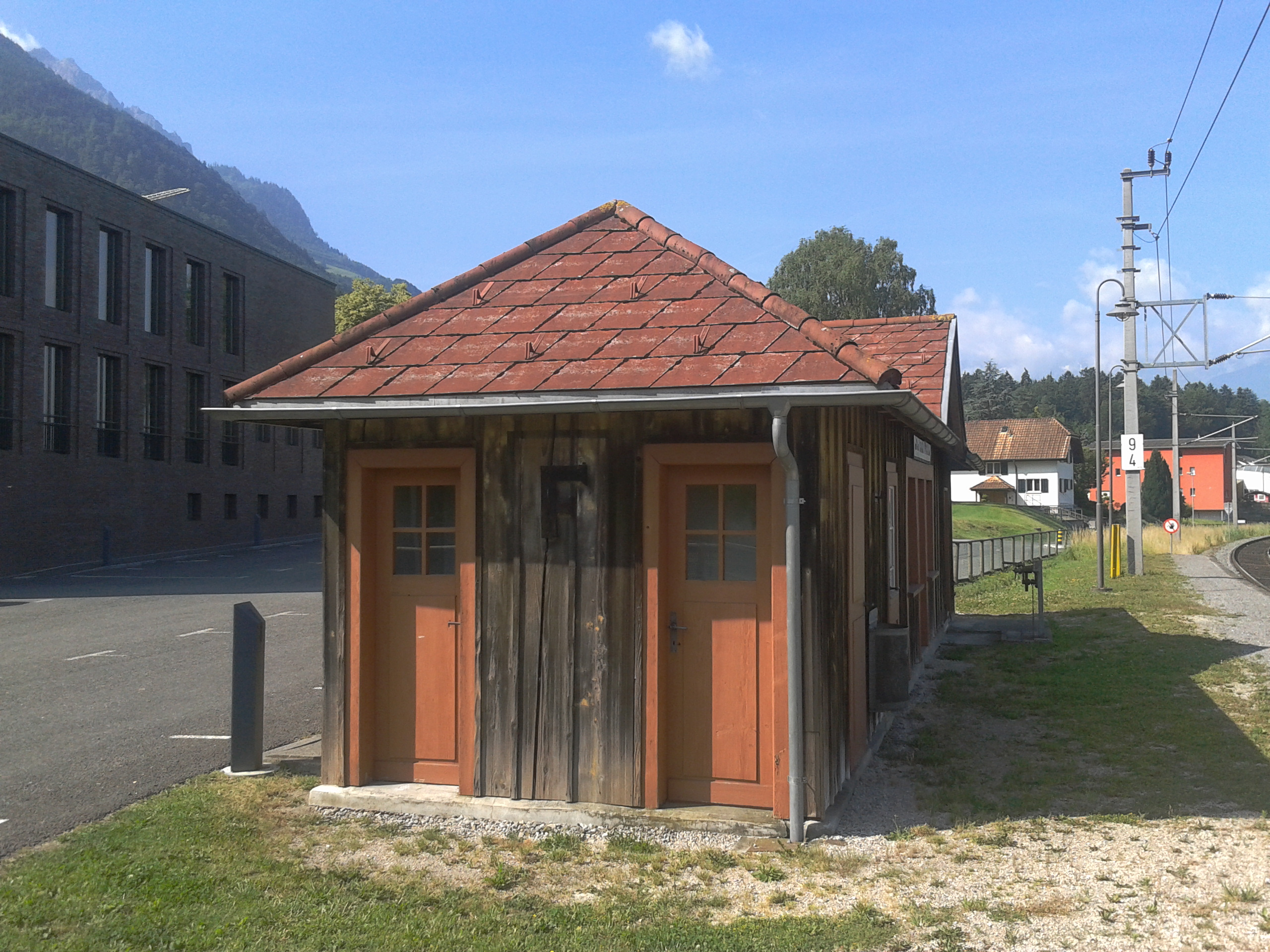
Schaanwald railway station

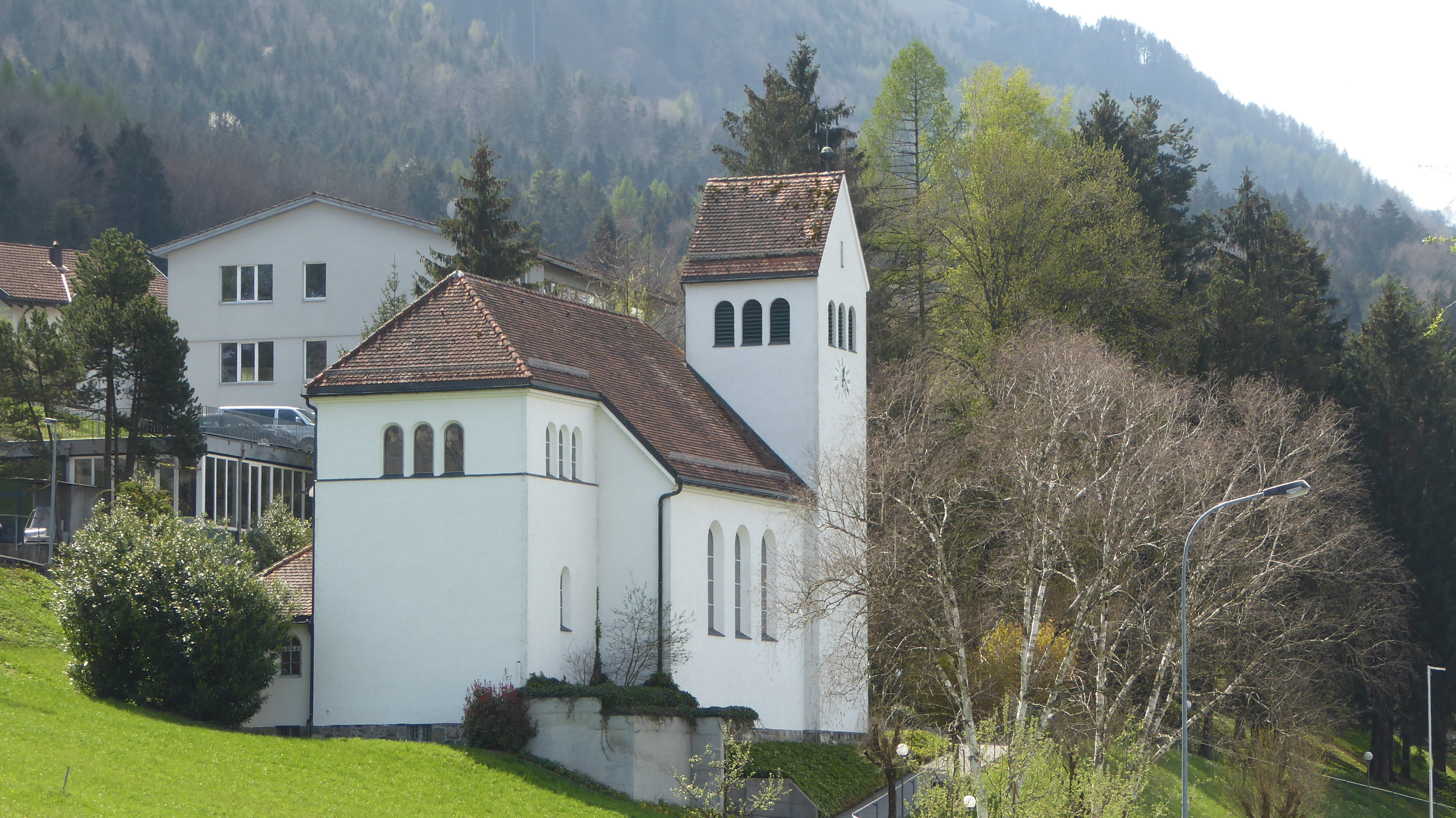
Chapel of Therese von Lisieux
