= Schaanwald railway station =

Railway station serving Liechtenstein

Schaanwald
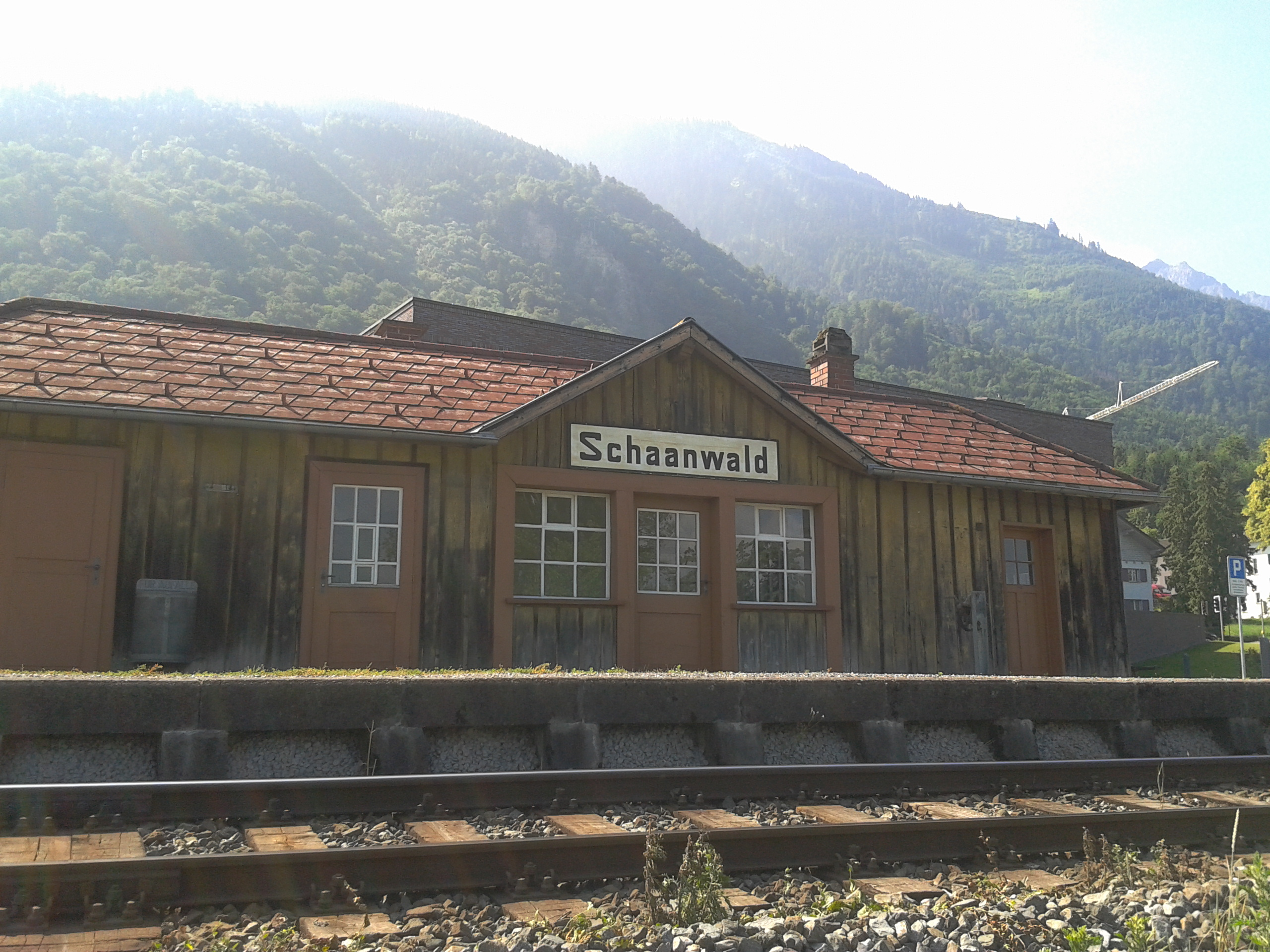

General information
- Location: Bahnweg, Schaanwald; Liechtenstein
- Coordinates: 47.2116°N 9.5616°E
- System: Railway station of Liechtenstein
- Owner: ÖBB
- Line: Feldkirch–Buchs
- Platforms: 1
- Tracks: 1

History
- Opened: 1902
Location
- Location within Liechtenstein

Schaanwald was a railway station in Liechtenstein along the Feldkirch–Buchs railway line. It is one of four railway stations in Liechtenstein and located in the village of Schaanwald in the Mauren municipality. The station is currently disused and not served by any train service.

== History ==
The station opened in 1902 and received a station building in 1928. It was staffed until 1988. Over time, the number of trains stopping at the station diminished considerably. From 2010 until 2012, only one train per day stopped here. Since 2013, the station is no longer served.

== Overview ==
Preceding station	ÖBB	Following station
Nendeln	ÖBB; Feldkirch–Buchs railway	Feldkirch-Tisis

== Customs ==
Schaanwald, when used, is for customs purposes, a border station for passengers arriving from Austria. Liechtenstein is in a customs union with Switzerland. Customs checks may be performed in the station or on board trains by Swiss officials. Systematic passport controls were abolished when Liechtenstein joined the Schengen Area in 2011.

== Gallery ==
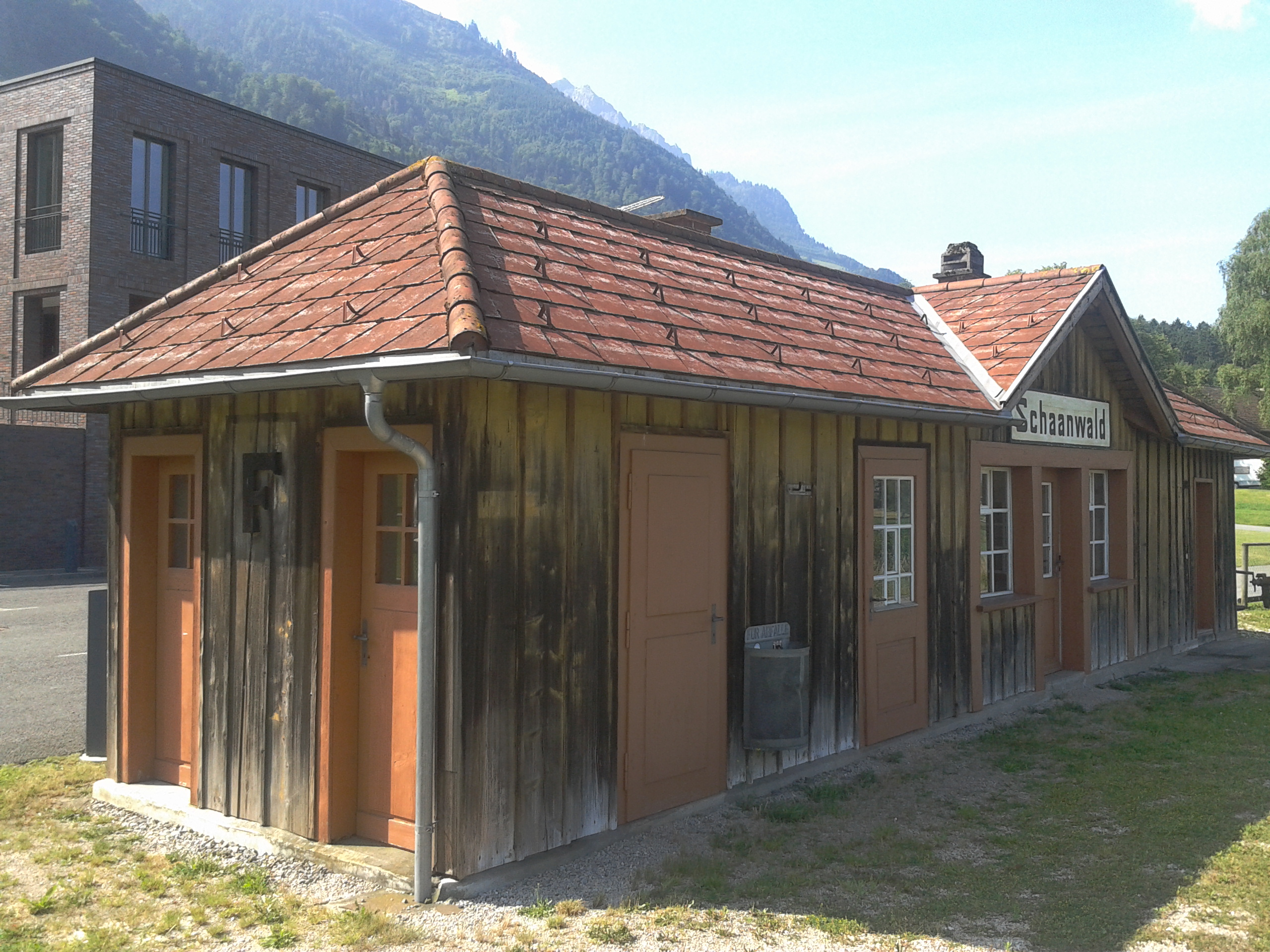
View of the station building

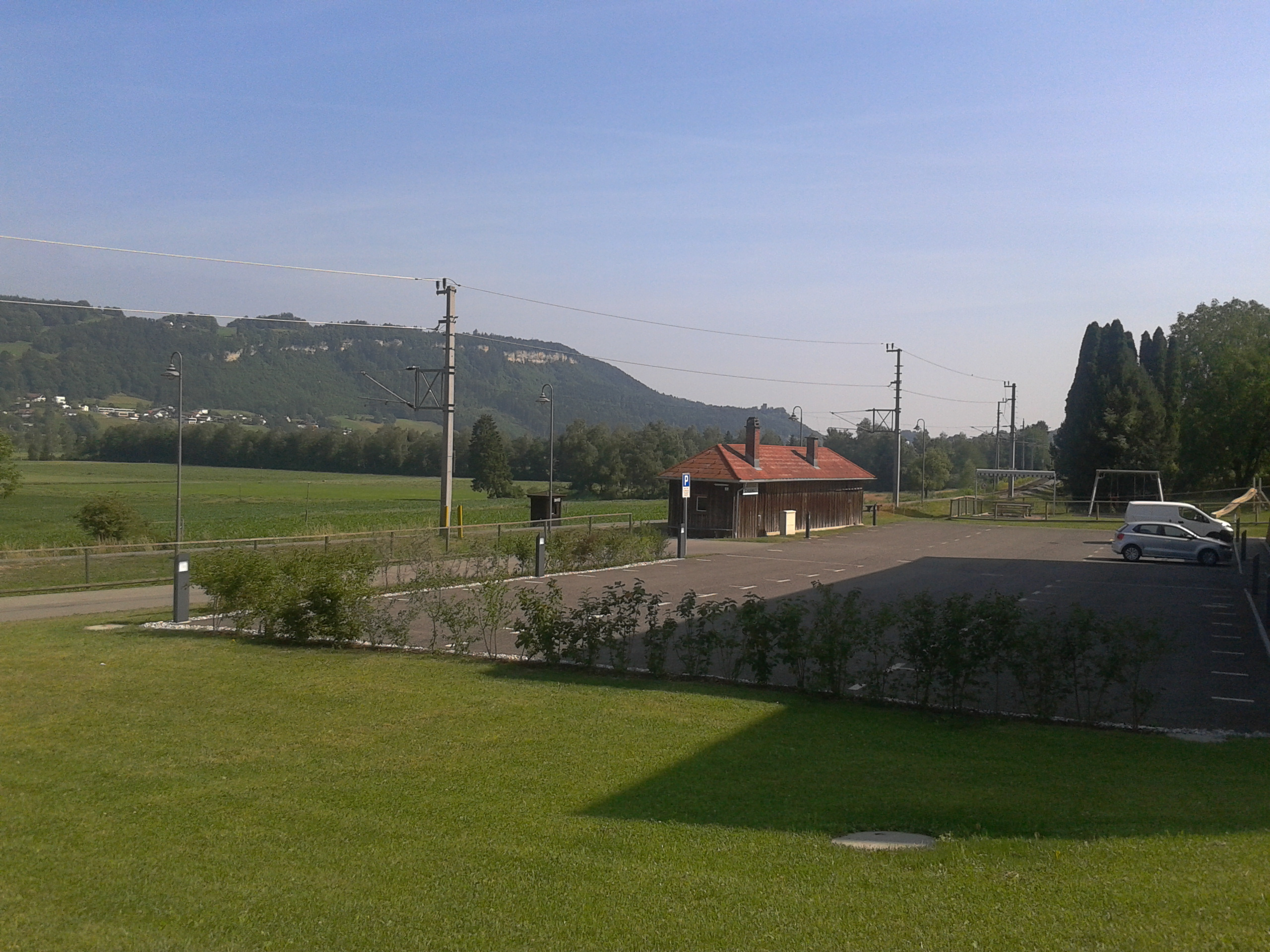
View of the station and car park

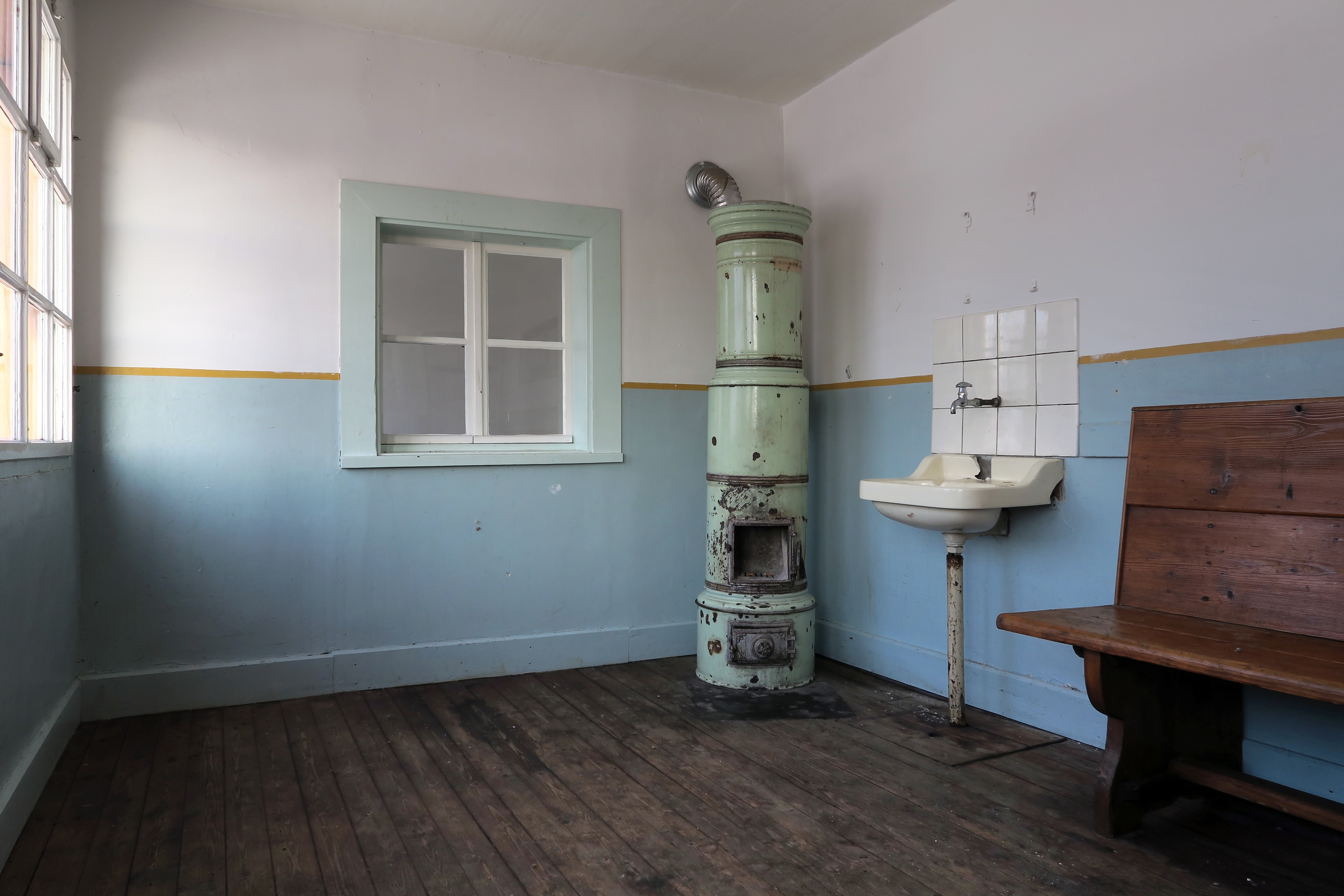
Station interior

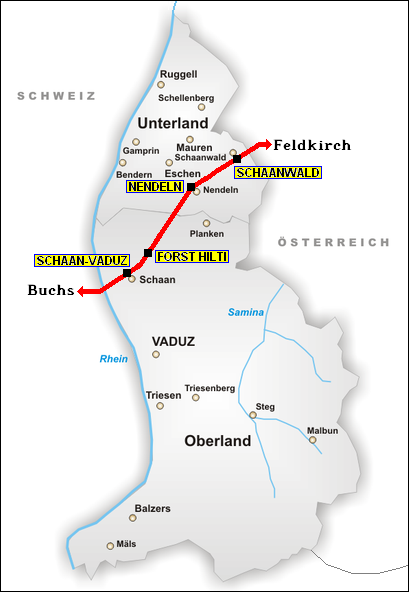
Map of the Feldkirch–Buchs railway

== See also ==
- Schaan-Vaduz railway station
- Forst Hilti railway station
- Nendeln railway station
- Rail transport in Liechtenstein
- Railway stations in Liechtenstein
