= Buchs SG railway station =

Railway station in Buchs, Switzerland

Buchs SG
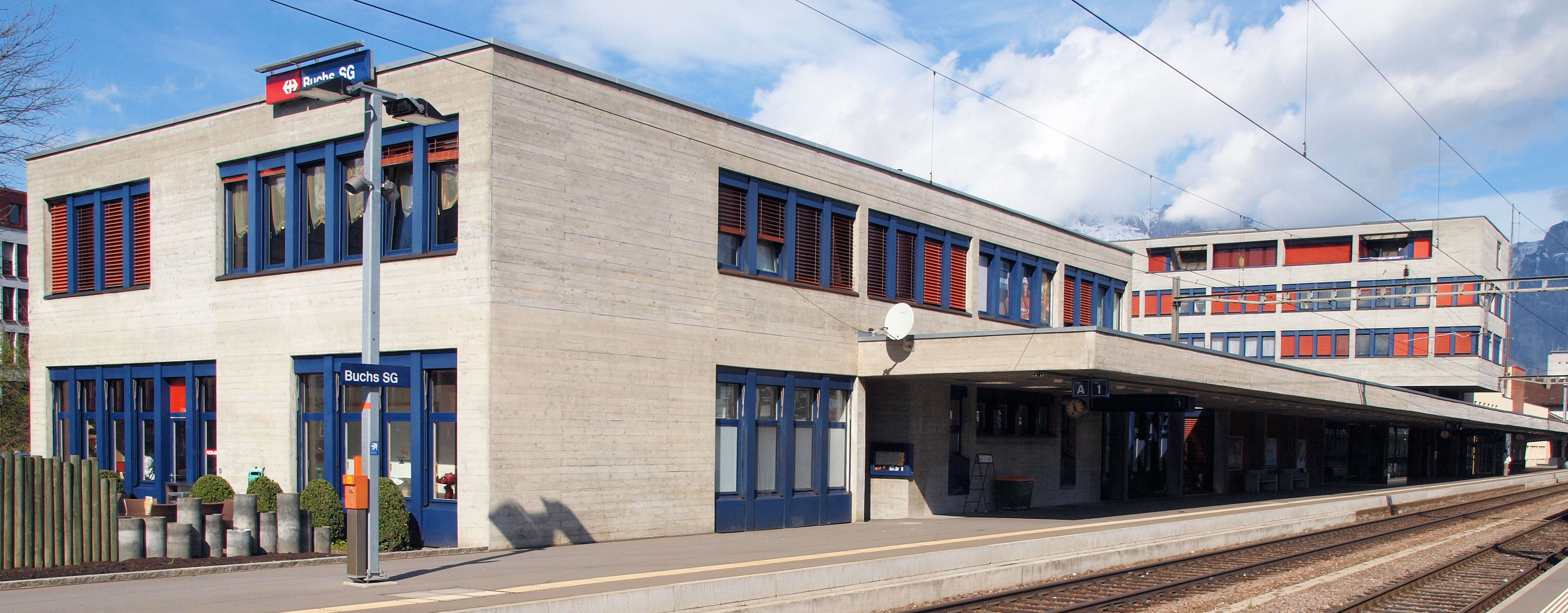
- The station building in 2010

General information
- Location: Buchs; Switzerland
- Coordinates: 47°10′06″N 9°28′43″E
- Owner: Swiss Federal Railways
- Lines: Chur–Rorschach line; Feldkirch–Buchs line
- Train operators: Südostbahn; Swiss Federal Railways; Austrian Federal Railways (ÖBB)
- Connections: Tarifverbund Ostwind
- Bus: Bus Ostschweiz routes 24 300 400 401 403; LIEmobil bus route 12; PostAuto bus route 797

Services
Preceding station	SBB CFF FFS	Following station
Reverses direction	EuroCity (Transalpin)	Feldkirch towards Graz Hbf
Reverses direction	EuroCity (Transalpin)	Sargans towards Zürich Hauptbahnhof
Altstätten SG towards Zürich HB	IR 13	Sargans Terminus
Preceding station	ÖBB	Following station
Sargans towards Zürich HB	Railjet Express	Feldkirch towards Vienna Airport
Sargans towards Zürich HB	Railjet Express	Feldkirch towards Bratislava hl.st.
Sargans towards Zürich HB	Railjet Express	Feldkirch towards Budapest Keleti
Zürich HB Terminus	EuroNight	Feldkirch towards Budapest Keleti
Zürich HB Terminus	EuroNight	Feldkirch towards Praha hl.n.
Zürich HB Terminus	EuroNight	Feldkirch towards Zagreb
Zürich HB Terminus	Nightjet	Feldkirch towards Graz Hbf
Preceding station	Südostbahn	Following station
Altstätten SG towards St. Gallen	IR 13 Alpenrhein-Express	Sargans towards Chur
Preceding station	St. Gallen S-Bahn	Following station
Salez-Sennwald towards Rapperswil	S4	Sevelen towards Sargans
Preceding station	Vorarlberg S-Bahn	Following station
Terminus	S2	Schaan-Vaduz towards Feldkirch
Location
- Location within Switzerland Location within Canton of St. Gallen

Buchs SG railway station (German: Bahnhof Buchs SG) is a railway station in Buchs, in the Swiss canton of St. Gallen (abbreviated to SG). It is an intermediate stop on the Chur–Rorschach line and western terminus of the Feldkirch–Buchs line to Austria and Liechtenstein. It is served by local and long-distance trains. As the station is located just north of the crossing of the Rhine between Switzerland and Liechtenstein, long-distance trains traveling between Zurich and points east must reverse direction.

== Services ==
=== Long-distance trains ===
As of December 2024, the following long-distance services call at Buchs SG:

- EuroCity Transalpin: Single round-trip per day over the Chur–Rorschach and Feldkirch–Buchs lines between Zürich HB and Graz Hauptbahnhof.
- : Hourly service over the Chur–Rorschach line between Zürich HB and Chur, half-hourly service between St. Gallen and Sargans.
- Railjet Express: Four round-trips per day over the Chur–Rorschach and Feldkirch–Buchs lines from Zürich HB to Wien Hauptbahnhof, Budapest Keleti, or Bratislava-Petržalka.
- Nightjet/EuroNight: Overnight trains over the Chur–Rorschach and Feldkirch–Buchs lines from Zürich HB to Graz Hauptbahnhof, Wien Hauptbahnhof, Praha hlavní nádraží, Budapest Keleti, or Zagreb Glavni kolodvor.

=== S-Bahn ===
Buchs SG is served by the St. Gallen S-Bahn and Vorarlberg S-Bahn:

- St. Gallen S-Bahn S4: hourly service between Rapperswil and Sargans via St. Gallen.
- Vorarlberg S-Bahn S2: on weekdays, 11 trains over the Feldkirch–Buchs line to Feldkirch, via Schaan-Vaduz.

=== Bus ===
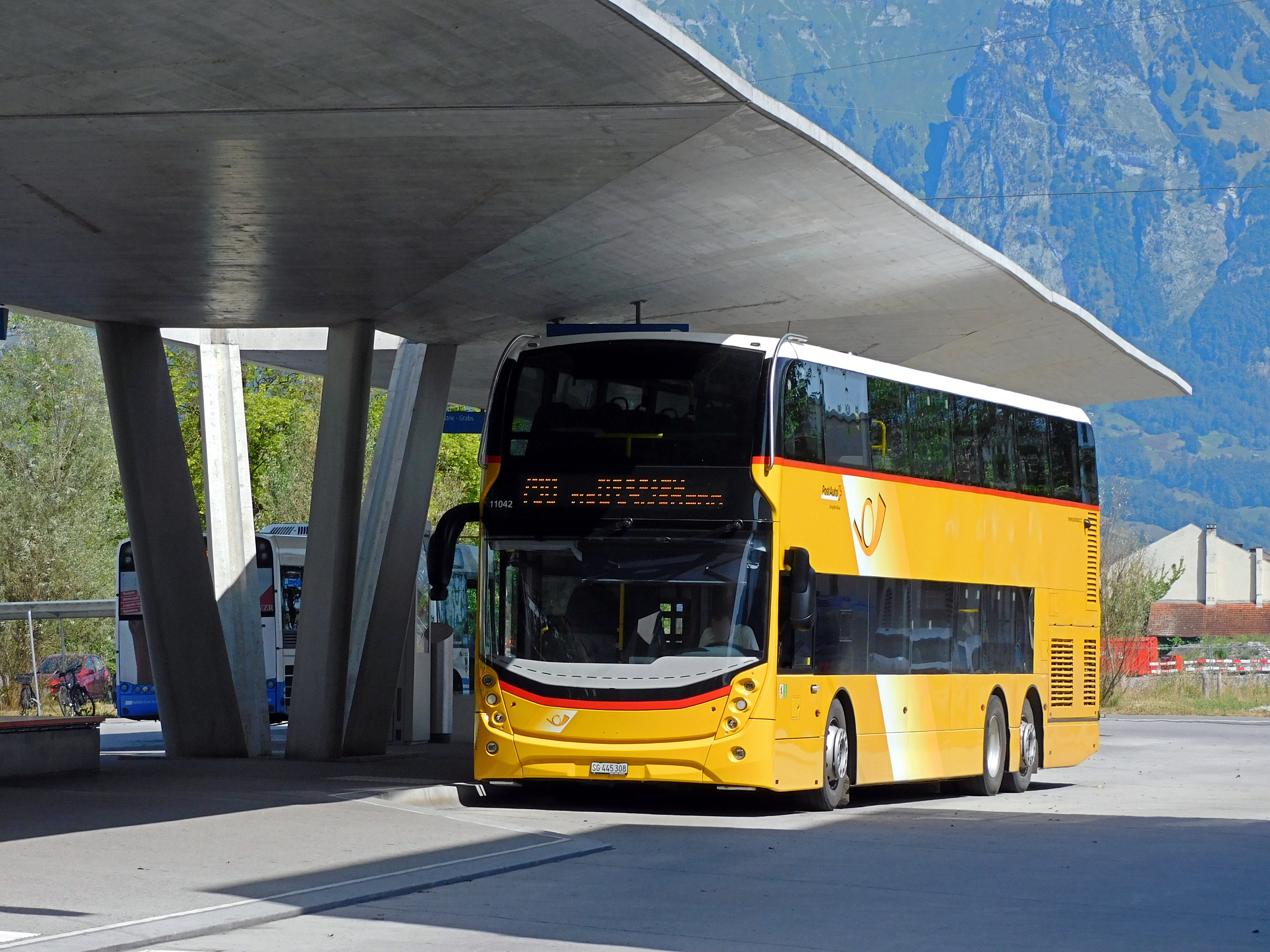
PostAuto bus at the bus terminal

There is a bus terminal in the station forecourt served by several regional routes. Bus Ostschweiz links the railway station with nearby towns on the Swiss side of the Alpine Rhine Valley, while a PostAuto bus route connects it with Wildhaus in Toggenburg. LIEmobil links the station with Schaan in Liechtenstein, with connections to other towns in Liechtenstein and to Feldkirch (Austria).

== Customs ==
Buchs SG is, for customs purposes, a border station for passengers arriving from Austria. Customs checks may be performed in the station or on board trains by Swiss officials. Systematic passport controls were abolished when Switzerland joined the Schengen Area in 2008.

== See also ==
- Rail transport in Switzerland
