= Hilti =

Liechtenstein-based power tools company

Coordinates: 47°10′50″N 9°31′27″E

- Type: Private
- Industry: Manufacturing
- Founded: 1941 (84–85 years ago)
- Headquarters: Schaan, Liechtenstein
- Key people: Martin and Eugen Hilti
- Products: Power tools, anchors, diamond drills, laser products, firestops and fire protection
- Revenue: ▼CHF 6.4 billion (2024)
- Net income: ▲CHF 561 million (2024)
- Number of employees: 34,000 worldwide (2025)
- Website: hilti.com

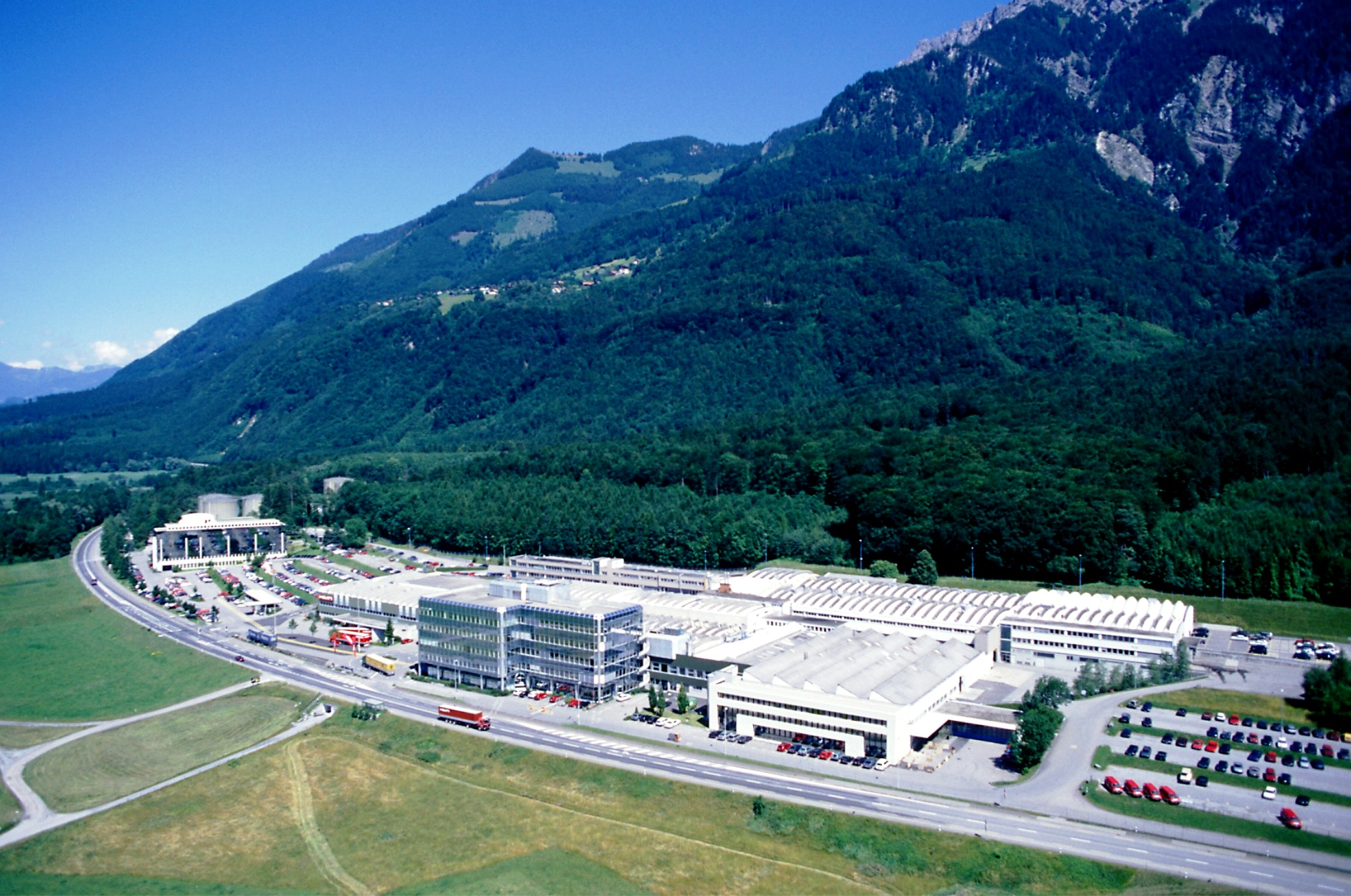
Headquarters of Hilti Corporation in Schaan, Liechtenstein

Hilti Corporation (Hilti Aktiengesellschaft or Hilti AG; also known as Hilti Group) is a Liechtensteiner multinational company that develops, manufactures, and markets products for the construction, building maintenance, energy and manufacturing industries, mainly to the professional end-user. It concentrates mainly on anchoring systems, fire protection systems, installation systems, measuring and detection tools (such as laser levels, range meters and line lasers), power tools (such as hammer drills, demolition hammers, diamond drills, cordless electric drills, heavy angle drills, power saws) and related software and services.

Hilti, a registered trademark of the various Hilti corporate entities, is the family name of the company's founders.

== History ==
=== 1941–1946 ===
In 1941, the Hilti company Maschinenbau Hilti OHG was founded by Martin (1915–1997) and Eugen Hilti (1911–1964), with the opening of a mechanical workshop in Schaan, Liechtenstein. Martin Hilti was trained in mechanical engineering and automotive design at the Wismar Engineering College and was 26 at the time of founding the company. He was also a voluntary Waffen-SS and functionary in the German National Movement in Liechtenstein as editor-in-chief for Der Umbruch. The Martin Hilti Family Trust holds all of Hilti's registered shares as of 2003.

Immediately after its founding, Hilti delivered to the German arms industry. Some of these were goods that were important to the war effort, such as components for tank engines or parts of projectile fuses. Hilti supplied the then arms companies Maybach-Motorenbau in Friedrichshafen and Robert Bosch GmbH in Stuttgart.

=== 1947–1963 ===
After the war, there was a sharp decline in sales and the company was close to bankruptcy. To make ends meet Martin Hilti signed sub-contracts as diverse as grey cast iron parts for the Swiss textile industry, machining eggcups melds, or lighters and pencil sharpeners. In the late 1940s Martin Hilti found a technology that would allow setting nails into concrete or masonry, and he acquired the original designs and the patents rights of what would later become Hilti's Direct Fastening first tool. Although promising, the technology proved to be immature, and required significant development. In the meantime, through the early 1950s, Hilti produced its own line of household products, which included a cigarette lighter, and a water-powered kitchen mixer called "Ello", which enjoyed considerable success. In 1952 Hilti launched its first construction-related product, a manual tool to drive threaded studs into steel. In 1953 the company introduced its first powder-actuated high-velocity fastener that allowed setting nails into concrete, called Perfix.

At this time Hilti opened offices in Italy, Belgium, Poland, Finland, Norway, Germany, Denmark, the Netherlands, Portugal, Austria, France, Australia, Canada, and the USA. In 1963 Hilti was present in 23 countries, with a turnover of over 400 million Swiss francs.

=== 1964–1994 ===
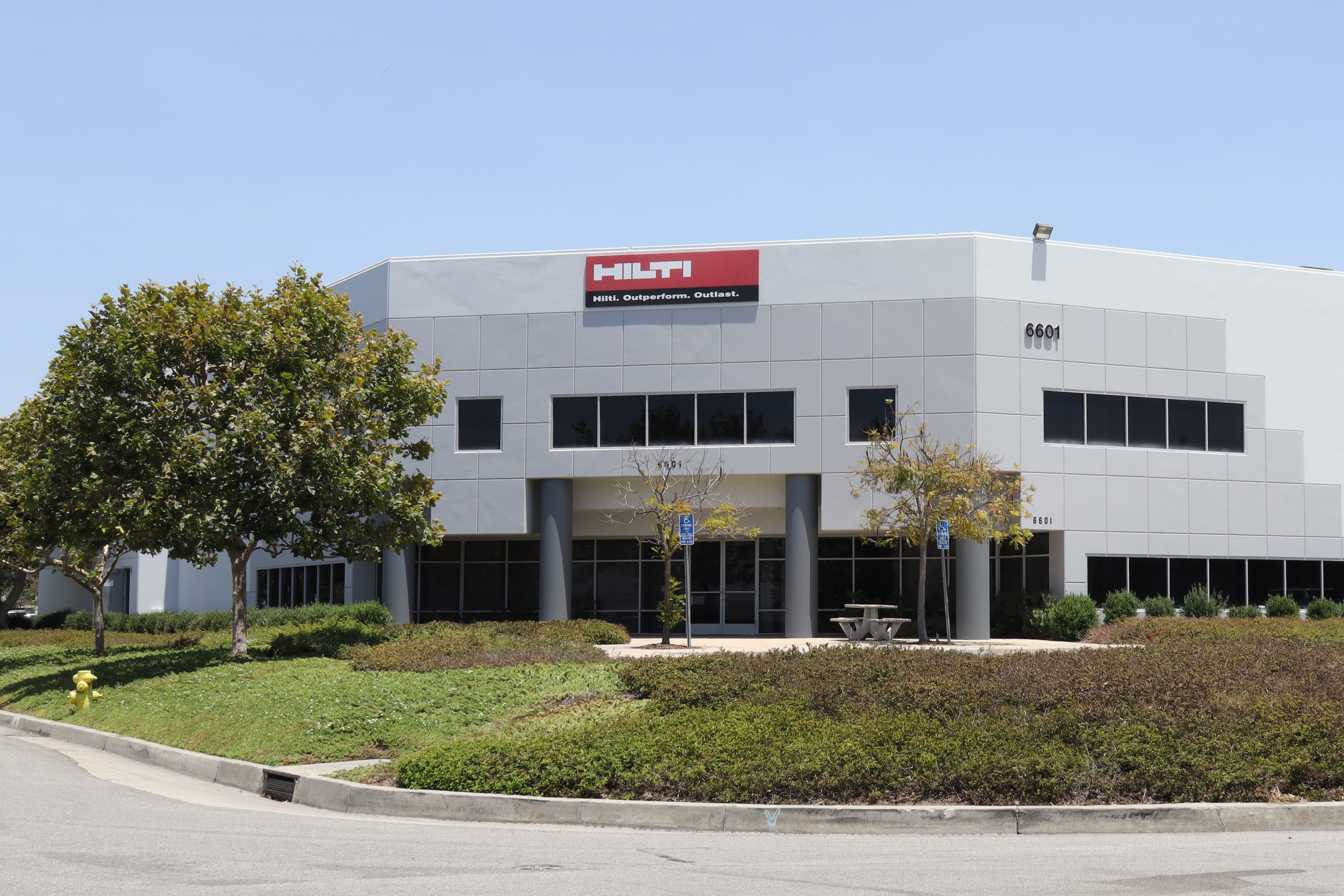
Hilti plant in Cypress, California, United States

In 1964 Hilti started marketing a drill that also had a chiselling function, made by the Kocher Company, in Basel, under the name "Torna 765". After receiving customer feedback Hilti started a product development and improvement project under the name "Torna Entwicklung" (German for "Torna Development"), or "TE" for short, which has since then become the standard name for all Hilti electropneumatic tools. In 1967 the company introduced the TE17, a fully electropneumatic rotary hammer drill which featured a safety clutch, and it was shipped to customers in Hilti's first distinctive red toolbox.

The global expansion continued throughout the 1960s and by 1971, Hilti's global turnover was 376 million Swiss francs across 45 countries, including new production facilities in Austria and in Germany.

In 1974 Hilti started to develop and market anchor bolts, and in 1977 Hilti introduced its first chemical anchor product line. Two more production facilities were opened, a plastic manufacturing plant in Germany purchased in 1975 and a plant in England acquired in 1978. In 1979 the company opened another production facility in Tulsa, Oklahoma, USA, to produce anchors. During the 1980s Hilti formed market region centres for America, Europe, Africa and Asia, to improve the proximity to their customers.

=== 1995–present ===
In 1995 Hilti opened its first Chinese manufacturing plant in Zhanjiang; this plant was expanded to 55,000 square meters in 2005. Another manufacturing plant was opened in Shanghai in 2004. This plant employs 470 people.

== Divisions ==
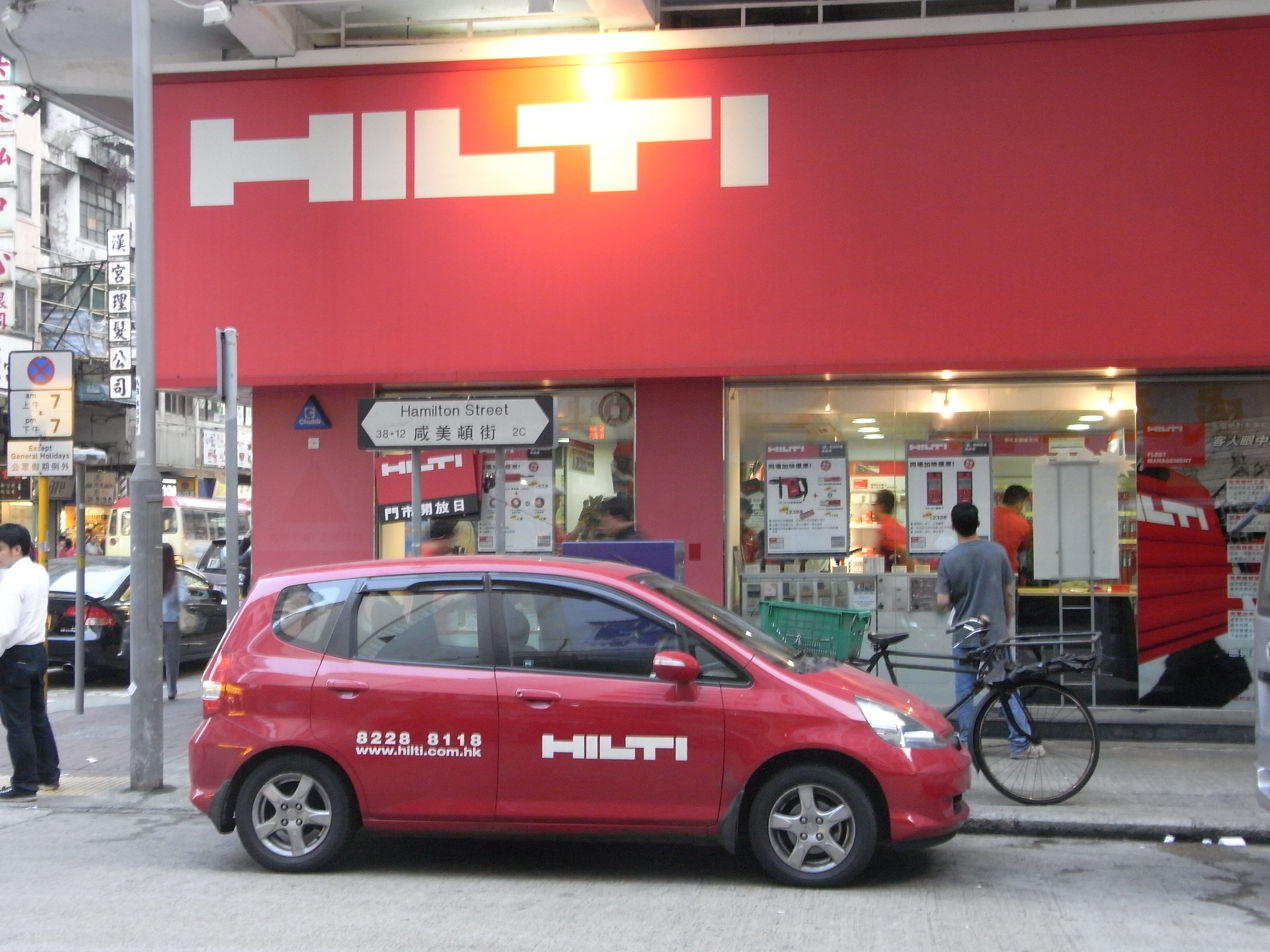
A Hilti store in Hong Kong

Hilti is based in Schaan, Liechtenstein, and is the principality's largest employer. The company employs around 30,000 people worldwide.

=== Hilti North America (HNA) ===
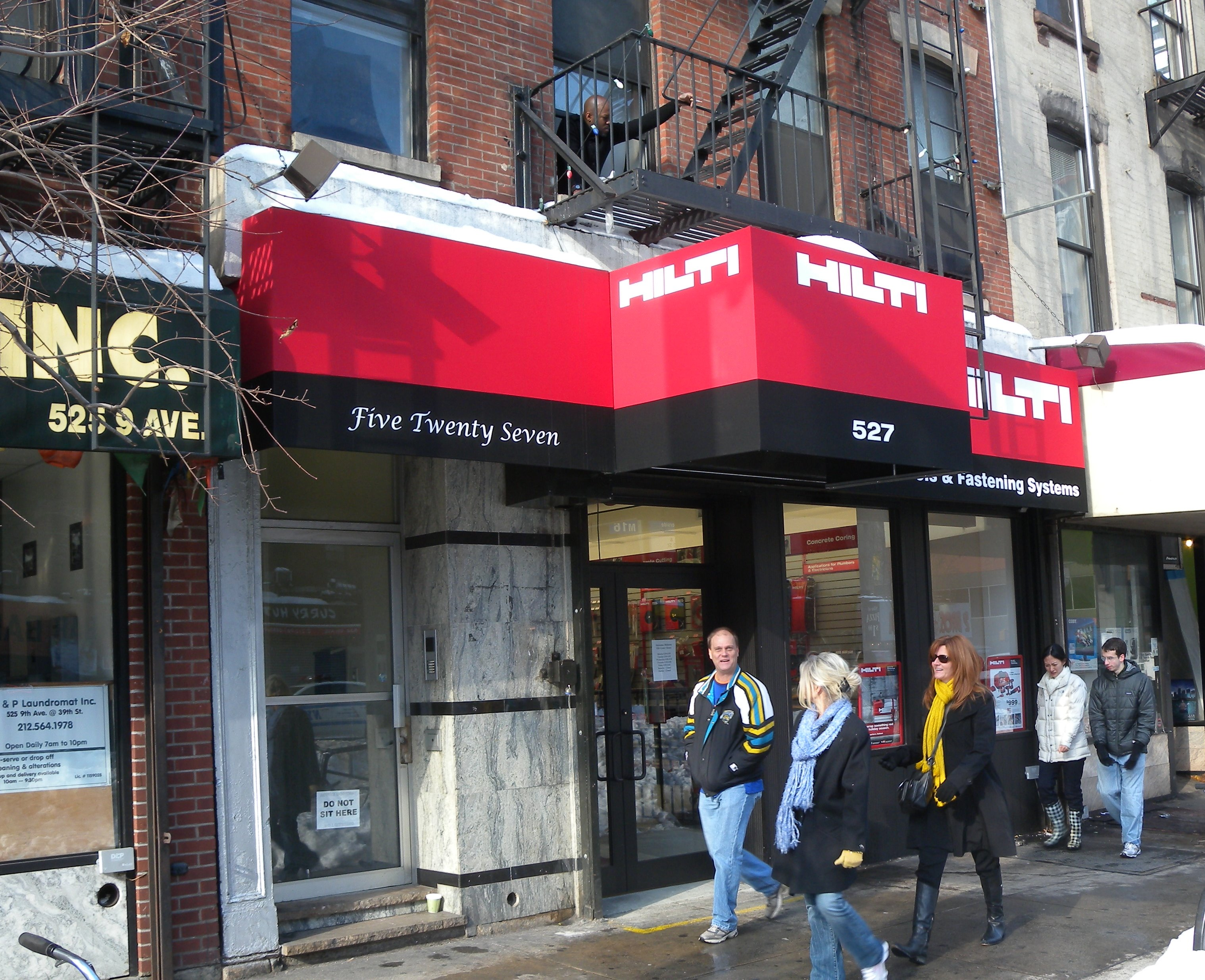
The North American flagship store in New York City

Hilti created its U.S. subsidiary in 1952 and was first headquartered in Stamford, Conn., until 1979, when it moved to Tulsa, Okla., then to Plano, Texas, in 2015 when it opened a research and development center in Irving, Texas. It has over 3,000 corporate employees, and maintains a direct sales force—an unusual strategy devised to readily reach customers—in all 50 states.

HNA developed an employee corporate culture that was later adopted by the entire company worldwide. New employees complete a Basic Training Seminar in Tulsa for two weeks, and on a yearly basis employees complete a survey called GEOS (Global Employee Opinion Survey) in which they give feedback about the company.

== See also ==
- Economy of Liechtenstein
- Forst Hilti railway station
