= Grassmayr Bell Foundry =

Bell foundry in Innsbruck, Austria

- Native name: Glockengießerei Grassmayr
- Type: Limited liability company
- Industry: Bellfounding
- Founded: 1599
- Founder: Bartlmä Grassmayr
- Headquarters: Innsbruck, Austria
- Products: church bells; animal bells; concert bells; bell towers; belfries; chimes
- Services: restoration; replication; metal casting
- Number of employees: approximately 40
- Website: www.grassmayr.at

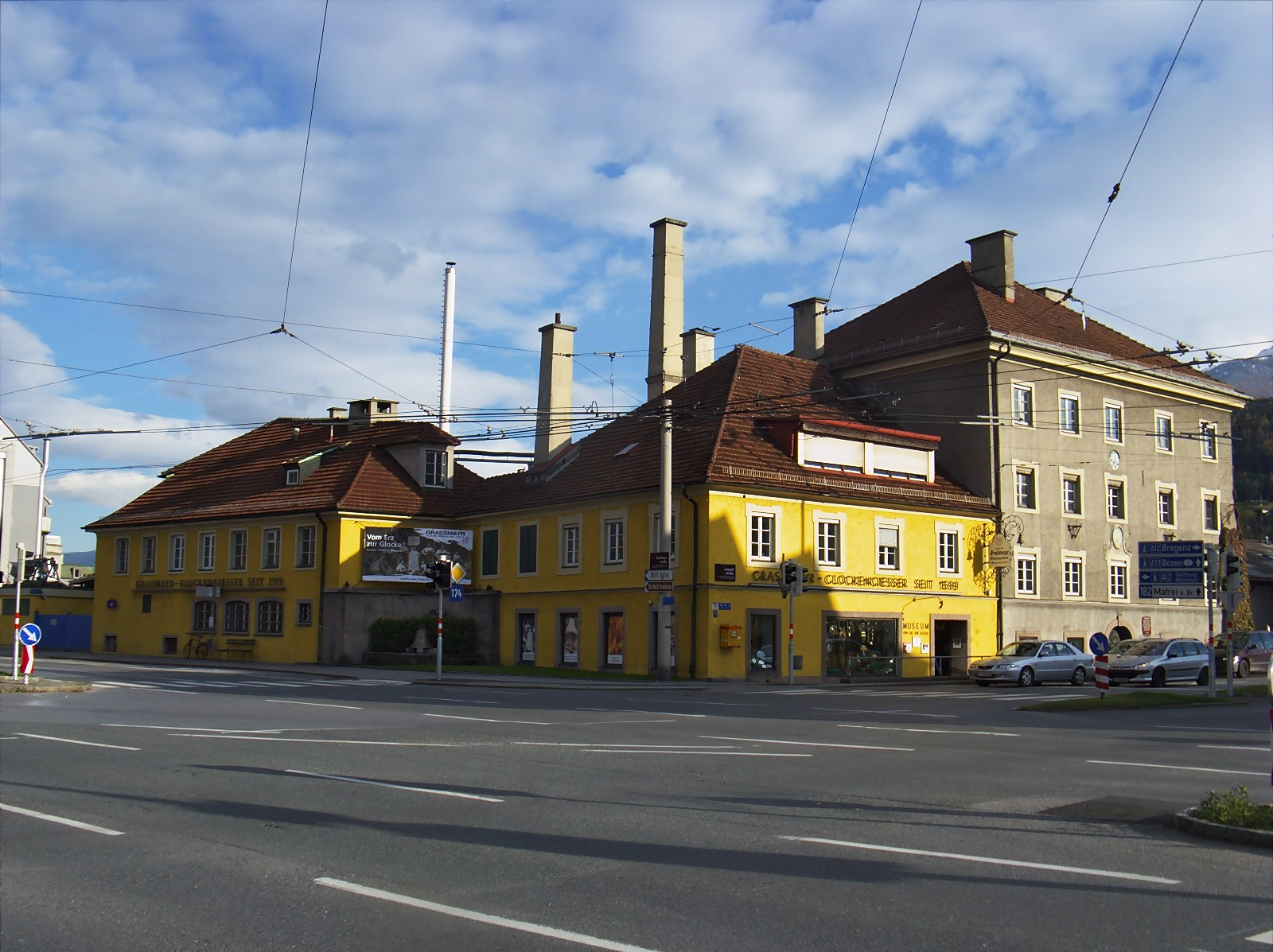
The Grassmayr Bell Foundry in Innsbruck, Tyrol

The Grassmayr Bell Foundry is a maker of church bells founded more than 400 years ago in Innsbruck, Austria. The business was founded by Bartlmä Grassmayr in Habichen, a hamlet in the municipality of Oetz. At present, the company is Austria's oldest family-run business and one of the largest bell manufacturers in the world, having supplied bells for eight religions in more than 100 countries on every continent.

== History ==
Bartlmä Grassmayr founded the company in 1599 in Habichen with the casting of his first bells after an eight-year journey; the company is probably the first bell foundry in Tyrol. He learned the art of bellfounding from the Aachen bell founder Joan von Teer. On 29 March 1595, it was acquired by his father, Hansen Grassmayr and was initially used for the casting of "harbors", the precursor of today's cooking pots.

On 16 May 1601 Bartlmä's son Johann Grassmayr (died 4 April 1683 in Wilten) was born. He continued the family business for many years. He completed the bell foundry apprenticeship with his uncle Jakob Veit Grassmayr in Feldkirch and spent several years as a wandering bell founder.

With the improvement of the transportation system in the country, the company relocated its headquarters to Innsbruck in 1836, where the foundry remains today. Further enterprises were then opened in Feldkirch and Brixen.

At present, Johannes Grassmayr of the 14th generation manages the business.

=== Traditional and modern symbols ===
At least one source has identified the symbols Grassmayr uses as maker's marks on their bells. These include sage leaves, angels and the griffin. A modern addition is the salamander.

== Notable work ==
- The oldest bell in Italy, cast in 1635, is a Grassmayr product.
- The six bells of the Romanian People's Salvation Cathedral were cast by Grassmayr. The largest measured 3.3 meters high by 3.3 meters wide and weighed 25 tons.
- The Innsbruck Cathedral's Mariahilfglocke, the second-largest bell in Tyrol, was cast by Grassmayr in 1846. Seven other bells in the cathedral are also Grassmayr-made.
- The world's largest tubular bell was cast by Grassmayr for the city of Aarhus, Denmark in 2015 as part of its preparations for becoming European Capital of Culture in 2017. The bell is 7.5 meters in length, 80 centimeters in diameter and weighs 3 tons. It is rung every time a baby is born in the city.
- A 15-ton bell was cast by Grassmayr in 2012 for the Greek Orthodox Church of Jerusalem monastery in Mount Tabor, Israel. Measuring almost 3 meters in diameter, the bell was transported by Gebrüder Weiss to Trieste and from there it was sent by ship to Israel.
- Grassmayr cast the 10-ton Mösern Peace Bell on the occasion of the Association of the Alpine States 25th anniversary. It is the largest swinging bell in the Alpine states area. It is rung daily at 5:00 in the afternoon.
- Grassmayr cast a 100-kilogram bell on the occasion of Pope Francis's visit to the Philippines in 2015. A 24-bell carillon was also completed for the Baclaran Church that same year.
- In 2022, Grassmayr cast Bell #9801, a 9801-kilogram memorial bell for Prague.
