= 9801 (disambiguation) =

9801 is the natural number following 9800 and preceding 9802.

9801 may also refer to:

- 9801, an album by singers Wooseok and Lai Kuan-lin
- Bell 9801, a bell in the Czech Republic
- (9801) 1997 FX3, a minor planet
