= Innsbruck Cathedral =

Baroque cathedral in Innsbruck, Austria

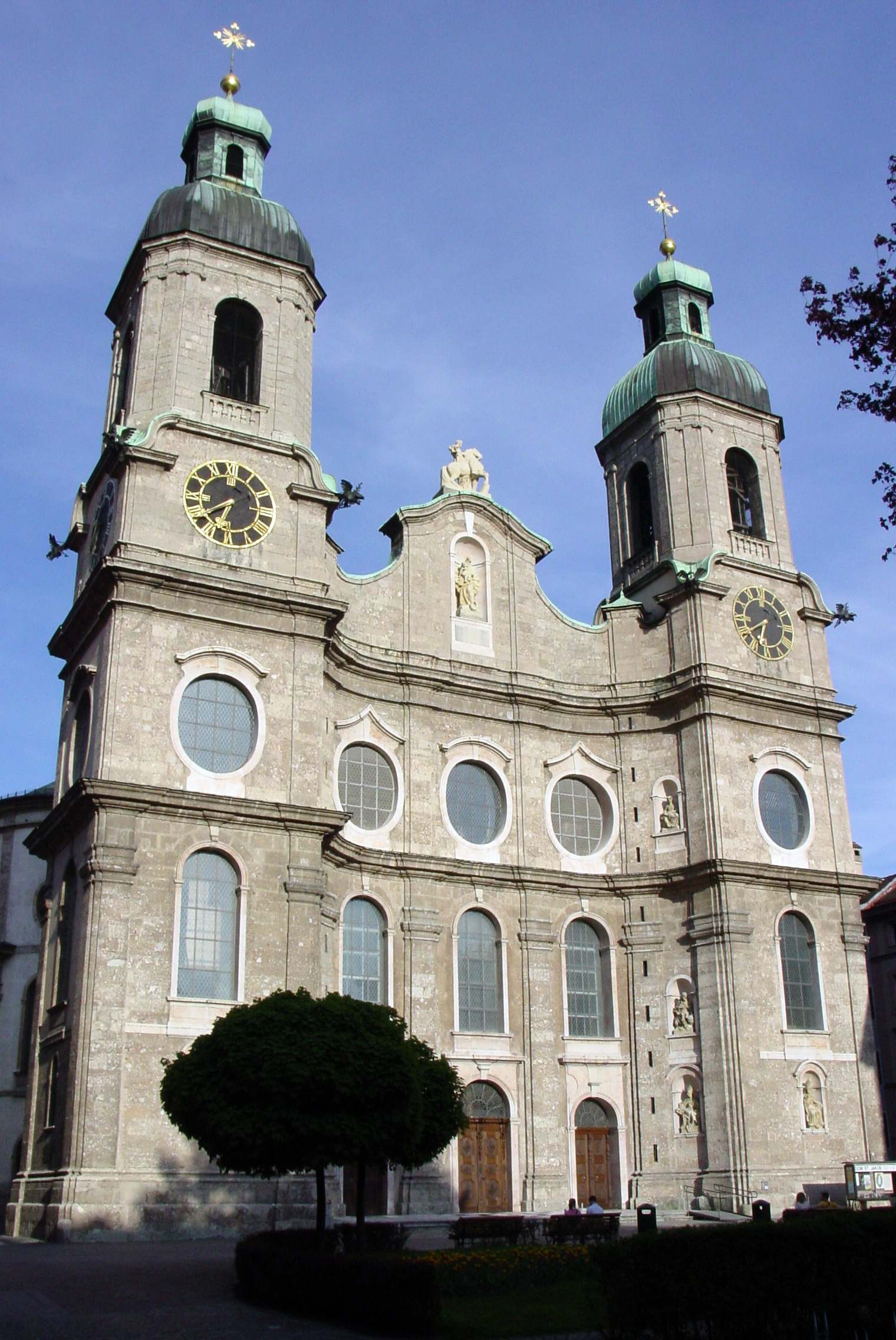
- Innsbruck Cathedral façade

- Location within Austria

Religion
- Affiliation: Catholic Church
- Ecclesiastical or organisational status: Cathedral
- Leadership: Bishop Hermann Glettler
- Year consecrated: 1724
- Status: Active

Location
- Location: Innsbruck, Austria
- State: Tyrol
- Coordinates: 47.2694°N 11.3942°E

Architecture
- Architect: Johann Jakob Herkomer
- Type: Church
- Style: Baroque
- Groundbreaking: 12 May 1717
- Completed: 1724

Specifications
- Direction of façade: West
- Width (nave): 17 metres (56 ft)
- Dome: 1

Website
- www.dibk.at

Innsbruck Cathedral, also known as the Cathedral of St. James (German: Dom zu St. Jakob), is an eighteenth-century Baroque cathedral of the Roman Catholic Diocese of Innsbruck in the city of Innsbruck, Austria, dedicated to the apostle Saint James, son of Zebedee. Based on designs by the architect Johann Jakob Herkomer, the cathedral was built between 1717 and 1724 on the site of a twelfth-century Romanesque church. The interior is enclosed by three domed vaults spanning the nave, and a dome with lantern above the chancel. With its lavish Baroque interior, executed in part by the Asam brothers, St. James is considered among the most important Baroque buildings in the Tyrol.

Innsbruck Cathedral is notable for two important treasures. The painting Maria Hilf (Mary of Succor) by Lucas Cranach the Elder from c. 1530 is displayed above the main altar. It is considered among the most venerated Marian images in Christendom. The cathedral also contains in the north aisle the canopied tomb of Archduke Maximilian III of Austria, Grand Master of the Teutonic Knights, dating from 1620. The cathedral was heavily damaged during World War II, but was fully restored within a few years.

== History ==
The earliest reference to a church at the site of the cathedral dates back to 1180 in a document drawn up between the Counts of Andechs and the Premonstratensian Abbey at Wilton, authorizing the market to be moved from the left to the right bank of the Inn river, signifying the foundation of the old town of Innsbruck. The document specifically mentions an ecclesia in toro in reference to a church. In 1187, the Alte Innbrücke (Old Inn Bridge) was constructed along with the establishment of a market. The name Innsbruck was first used around this time.

Not much is known about this first Romanesque church, only that it was incorporated in Wilten Abbey. Subsequent documents mention the first church, but nothing is known of its appearance or the artistic decoration. In the thirteenth and fourteenth centuries, the church was repeatedly destroyed or damaged by fire and earthquakes, making it necessary to repair and rebuild several times.

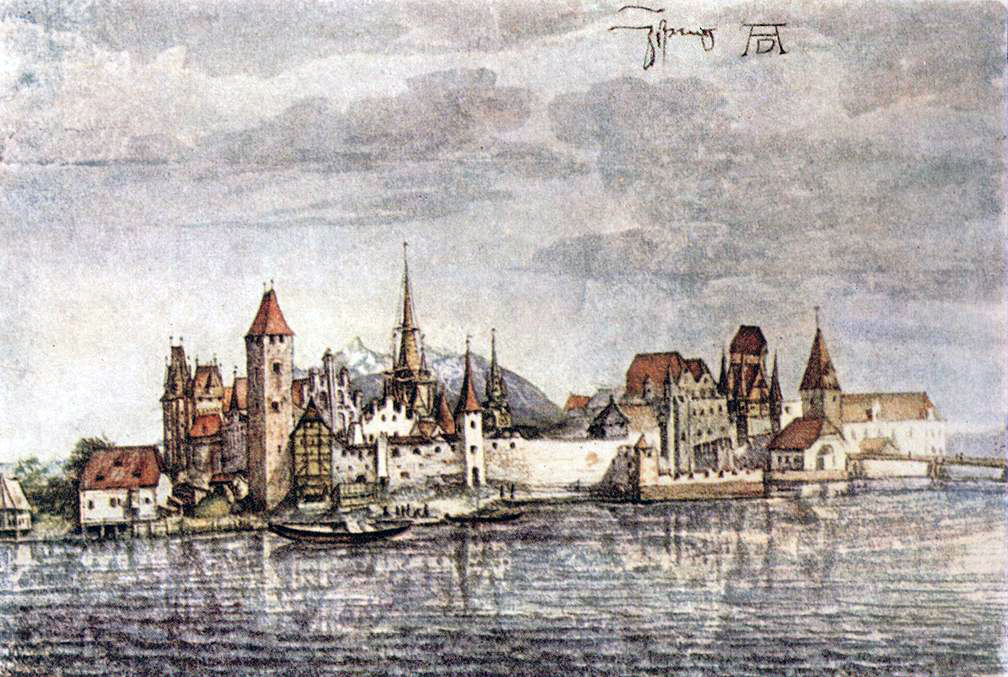
Watercolor of Innsbruck by Albrecht Dürer, 1495

In 1438, Nicholas of Cusa donated significant funds to have the church completely enlarged. In 1472, the first sacristy inventory was conducted, enumerating large quantities of liturgical books, embroidered chasubles, monstrances, and chalices. In 1495, Albrecht Dürer created the first depiction of the church in a watercolor he made while on his way to Venice. The church is shown with a single spire behind the fortified walls of the city. The watercolor is now housed in the Albertina in Vienna.

During this time, St. James was most likely a three-aisled hall church, common at the time throughout southern Bavaria and the Alps. In 1551, St. James was rebuilt again, converted into a single-aisled hall-like church. The renovation included plans to house the tomb of Emperor Maximilian I. Under Archduke Ferdinand II, a number of notable artists worked on the church, including Jörg Ebert of Ravensburg who constructed a new organ in 1567, and Alexander Colyn who created the tabernacle of Obernberg marble in 1571.

In 1643, following a long struggle by the citizens of Innsbruck, St. James became the parish church, independent of Wilten. In 1650, the masterpiece Maria Hilf ("Mary of Succour") by Lucas Cranach the Elder was donated to St. James by Archduke Ferdinand Charles and entrusted to a well known Marien brotherhood. During that period, the citizens of Innsbruck fought to have the old church demolished and replaced with a new one much safer against the many earthquakes that shook the area during that time. The ambitious building project had the support of notable secular and religious leaders. In December 1716, architect Johann Jakob Herkomer and his proposed design was selected, and on 12 May 1717, the foundation stone was laid, and within five months the foundation was completed. On 27 October 1717, Herkomer died suddenly, but he was replaced immediately by his nephew and first foreman, Johann Georg Fischer, who followed his uncle's plans, with only a few minor alterations.

The dome and towers were completed on 16 November 1720, and two years later Cosmas Damian Asam of Munich was selected to decorate the ceiling with scenes from the life of Saint James. Asam was paid 3,500 guilders for his work, and his brother Egid Quirin Asam received 2,400 guilders for the stucco work. The new church was dedicated on 9 September 1724 by Kaspar Ignaz Count Kunigl, Prince Bishop of Brixen. The nobility and parishioners embraced the new building and donated generously to its completion. The imperial family also donated valuable votive gifts. On the occasion of the birth of her eldest son, Empress Maria Theresa donated a silver sculpture of a child in swaddling clothes, as well as festive vestments. The interior was finally completed in 1732.

St. James retained its general appearance throughout the eighteenth and nineteenth centuries. In 1890, Albrecht Steiner von Felsburg was commissioned to undertake significant interior restoration. On 16 December 1944, St. James sustained major damage during the most severe air raid of Innsbruck in World War II. The bombing resulted in the collapse of the vault, the damage of frescos and stucco, and the destruction of altars and paintings. Between 1946 and 1950, extensive restoration of the church took place.

In 1964, St. James was elevated to the status of the Cathedral of the Diocese of Innsbruck. In 1973, on the occasion of the 250th anniversary of St. James' dedication, the façade of the cathedral was renewed. Between 1991 and 1993, comprehensive interior restoration was done to address all remaining war damage. On 24 October 1993 at the conclusion of the restoration, Bishop Reinhold Stecher dedicated the new altar and crypt.

== Exterior ==
Views of the St Jakob’s Cathedral in Innsbruck.

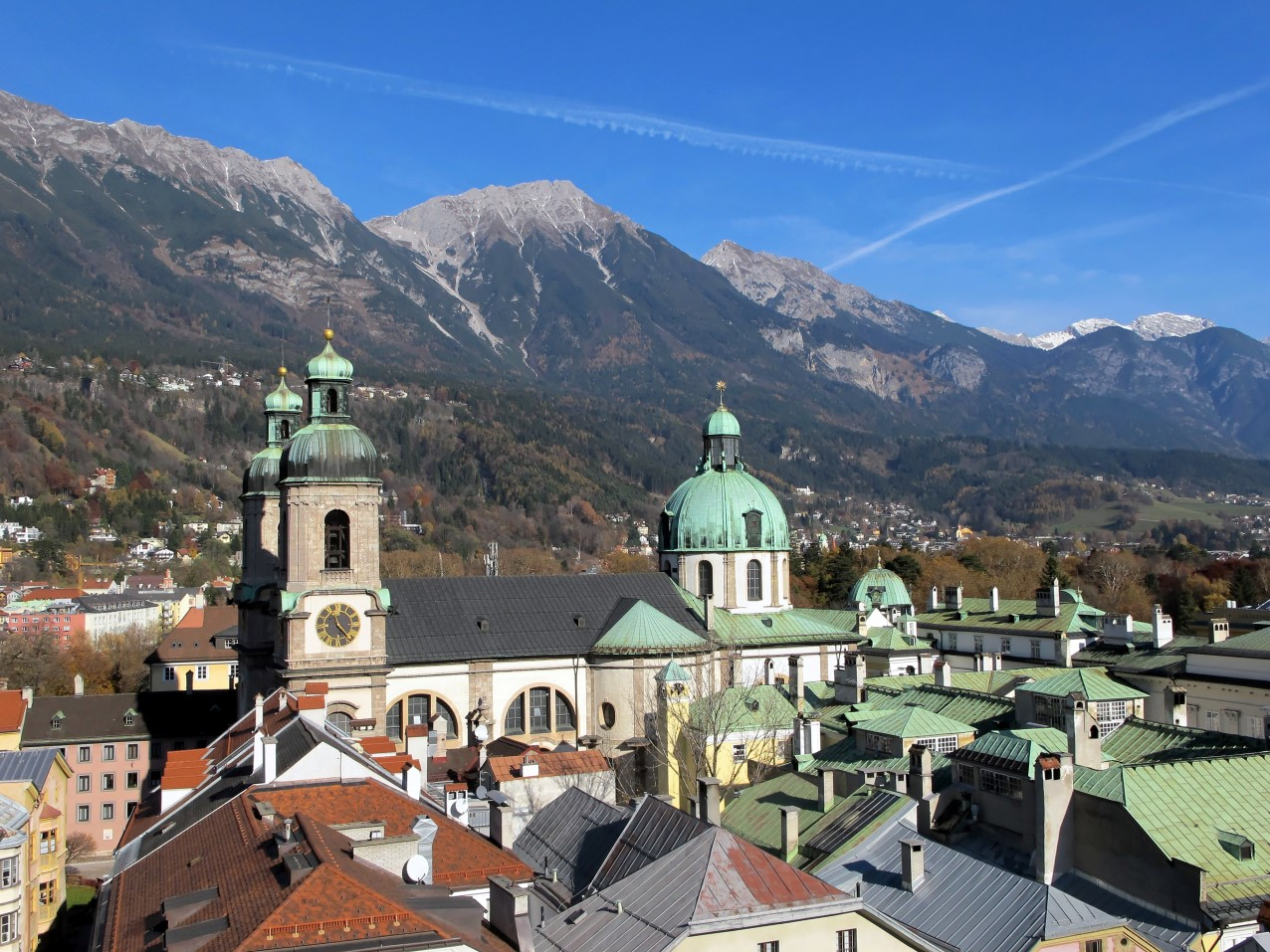
Innsbruck Cathedral and the Karwendel Alps

Innsbruck Cathedral, with its two bell towers and big dome, creates a dominant profile over the Altstadt (Old Town) skyline amidst the many green copper roofs in the town.

The facade, which faces west over the Pfarrplatz, is constructed of Hötting breccia and Hagau marble and is dominated by its two towers. The round arched wall niches in the concave curve of the façade contain limestone statues of saints from the Tyrol: Hartmann, Cassian, Ingenuin, Albuin, Notburga, Romedius, Magdalena of Austria, and Heinrich von Bozen. These statues were created between 1941 and 1960 by Hans Andre, who also created the statue of the Virgin in the façade gable and the equestrian statue of Saint James above it.

The ground plan of the structure is traditional and cruciform with two west towers, a twin-bayed nave, a semicircle transept, and a straight-ended choir, framed by the sacristy and two concluding passages. The nave and transept are covered by saucer domes completely decorated with frescos—the first time in the Tyrol where this decorative technique was used. Another unique element of the building is the placement of the dome above the choir, and not above the crossing which is customary. The architect Herkomer, who was known for bringing together "all the church beauty from German and Latin lands", chose a Renaissance approach by giving the church a unique architectural element that helped create a symbolic focus on the high altar and tabernacle—a focus later enhanced by the inclusion of the painting Maria Hilf.

== Interior ==
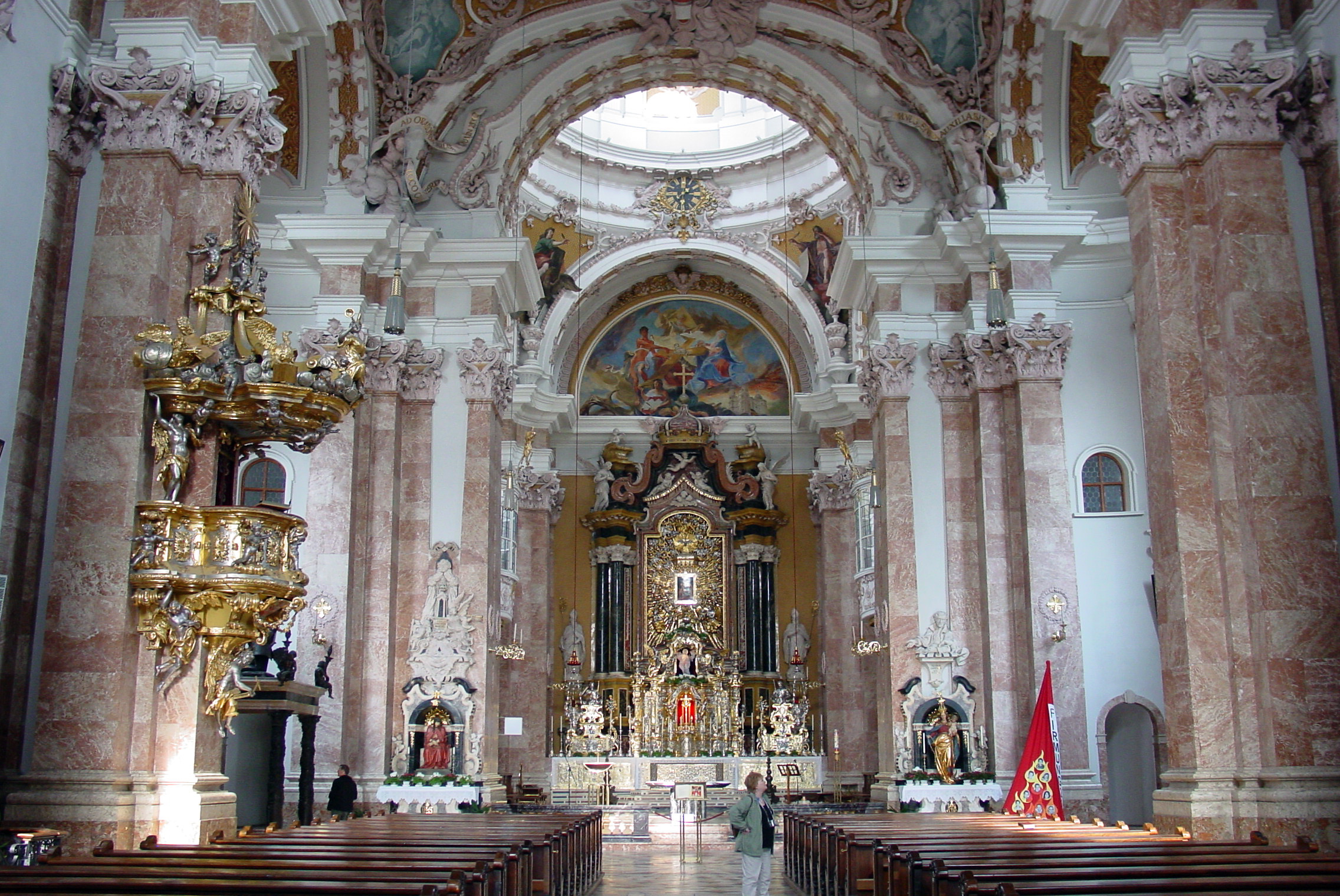
Innsbruck Cathedral interior

The cathedral interior projects a "severe monumentality" based on a series of heavy pillars that create a repeated triumphal arch motif. The pillars support the saucer domes that are in fact mock vaults consisting of flat wooden ceilings with concave moulding that spans the width of the interior. The segmented walls are divided by the pillars with marble lesenes on all sides. The powerful entablature is highly angulated and turns upwards above the windows creating links between the groups of windows.

The high dome illuminates the choir and directs the eye toward the high altar, which takes up the entire width of the choir. The cathedral interior creates a "sweeping spacial unity", unlike the Baroque churches constructed in the Tyrol up to that time, which consisted of a tunnel vaulted nave of elongated multi-sectioned rooms with rows of chapels and galleries lining both sides. Herkomer rejected this partitioned design approach, and for the first time in the province, created an expansive interior with a spacial unity directed toward the domed choir and high altar.

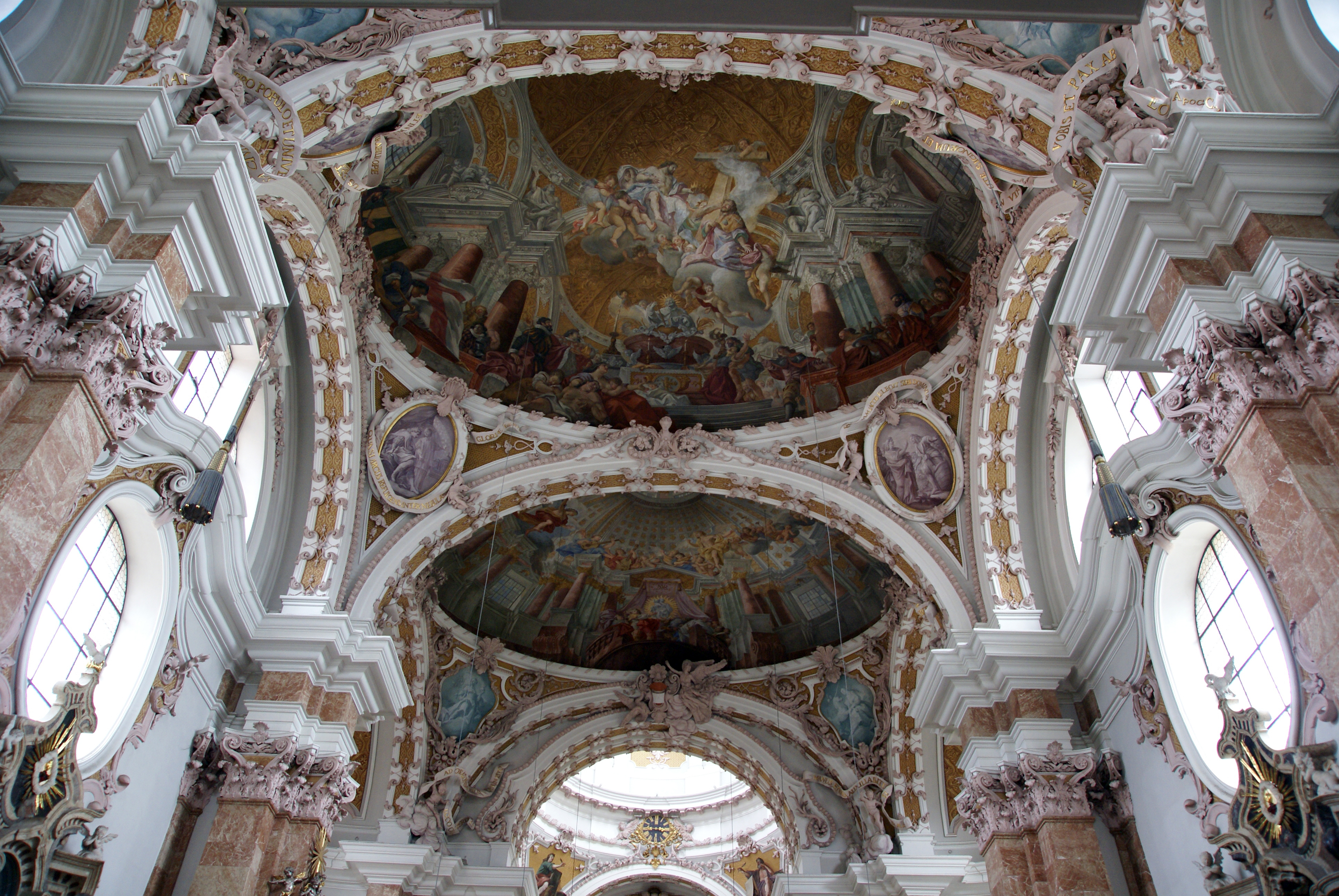
Frescos by Cosmas Damian Asam

The cathedral interior receives its characteristic appearance from the frescos that decorate the vaulting, with their color fully realized by the abundant natural light from the clear windows. The frescos were painted by Cosmas Damian Asam from Bavaria. Trained in Italy, Asam was the first south German artist to employ the technique of optical illusion to project endless space. The cycle of four frescos he created for the cathedral celebrate the life of Saint James, son of Zebedee, the patron of the church. In the main dome, Saint James is presented as a heavenly general with flag in hand, leading the Spanish Christian army against the Moors. The spandrels show the four evangelists, and the side arches feature angels with the attributes of Saint James. In the transept dome, Saint James is shown pointing to a Marian altar, urging the faithful to venerate the Virgin. In the fresco above the nave, the saint is shown interceding on behalf of suffering humanity. In the dome above the organ, the saint is presented as the intercessor for Innsbruck, the Tyrol, Austria, and the Catholic Church. The small spandrel paintings associated with each fresco show allegorical figures that reference the main frescos.

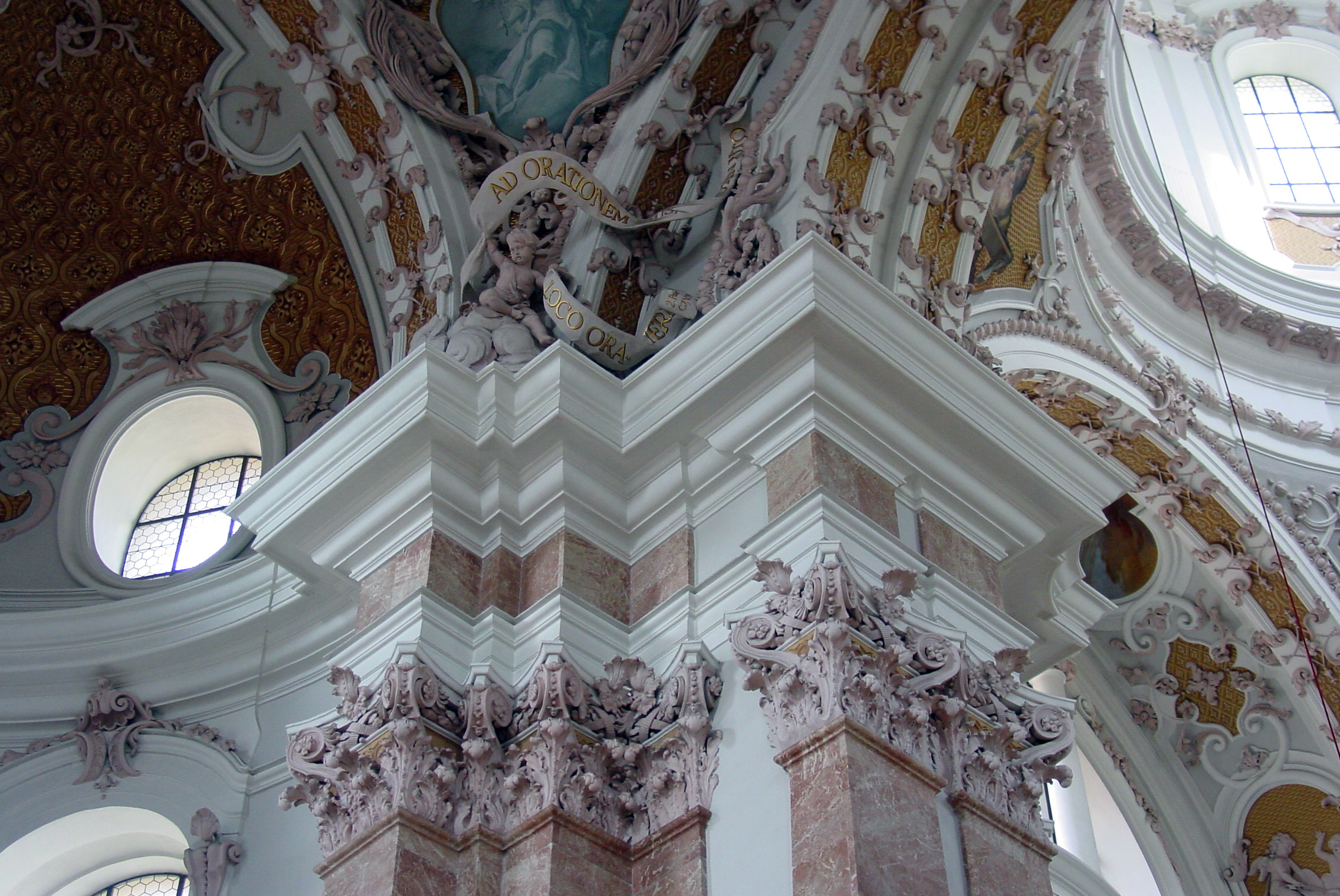
Stucco work by Egid Quirin Asam

The stucco work by the artist's younger brother, Egid Quirin Asam, reflects the visual vocabulary of the Renaissance in both form and color, and supports the dominant presence of the paintings. In concert with the harmony achieved between the frescos and stucco, and between the natural light and color, the design of the floors and walls plays a special supporting role. Consisting of an imaginative display of geometric patterns, the marble floors of the cathedral—considered among the finest in Austria—were designed by Christoforo and Theodoro Benedetti from the Trentino region. They also designed the nine cathedral altars—all made entirely of multicolored Trentino and Veronese marble—as well as the pilasters in the nave, for which they chose Hague marble. The side galleries above the presbytery, with their gilded Rococo ornamentation, were added during the time of Empress Maria Theresa.

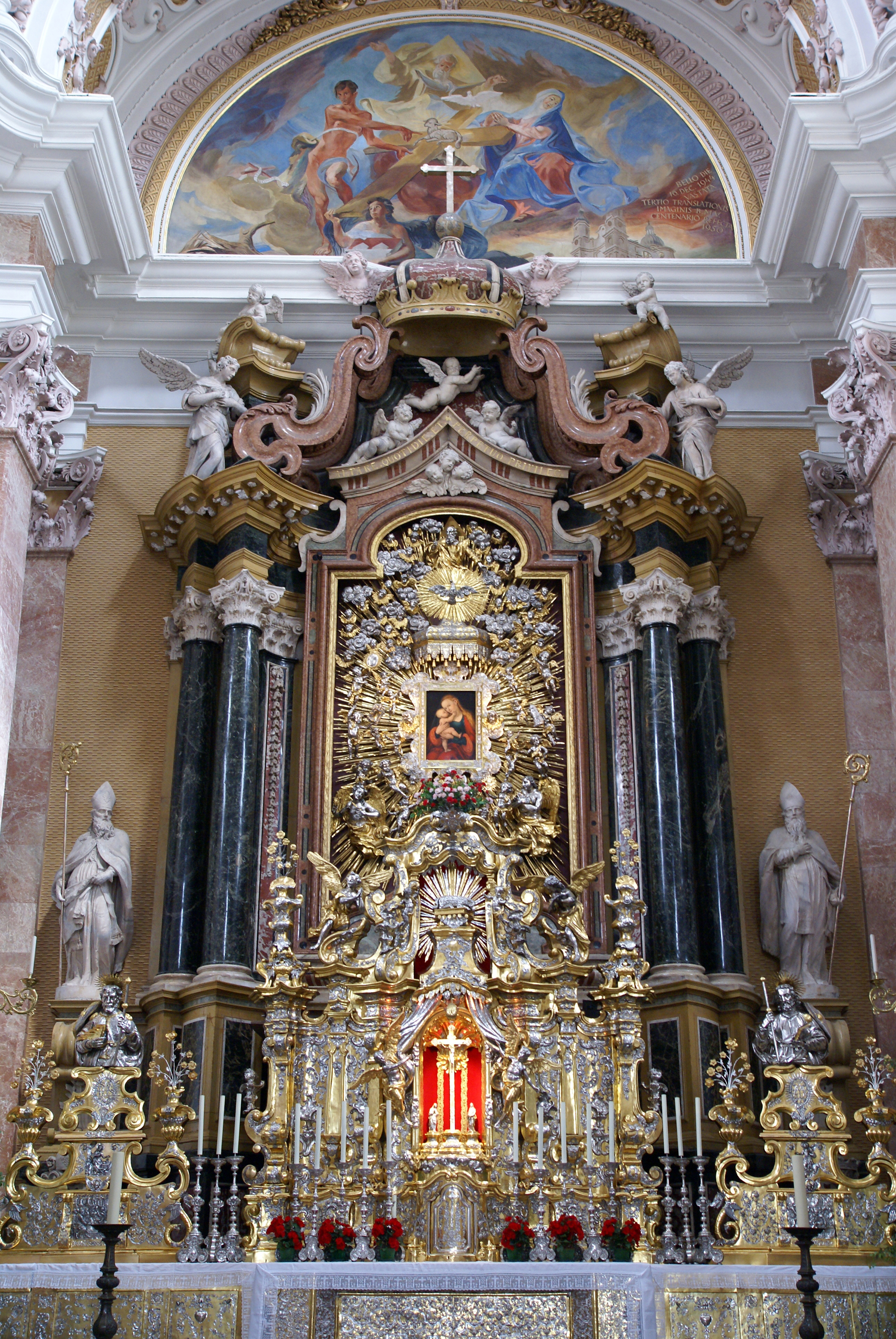
High altar

The cathedral has nine altars: the high altar, six side altars, and two small altars by the chancel arch. The high altar is the showpiece of the cathedral. Donated by Prince Bishop Count Künigl, the high altar is flanked by statues of Saint Ingenuin and Saint Albuin, the patron saints of the diocese of Brixen. (Note: Saint Ingenuin and Saint Albuin were bishops of Säben Abbey from the sixth and tenth centuries respectively.) The magnificent silver altar is one of the most outstanding examples of late Baroque craftsmanship in Austria. Donated by Elector Charles III Philip of the Palatine in 1712, this highly ornate tabernacle frame was enlarged in 1729 and 1750. On occasion it is adorned with silver busts of the church patrons and two Mannerist silver statuettes, created c. 1600 after a model by Hubert Gerhard.

The imposing marble structure of the high altar contains the cathedral's most precious treasure, the painting Maria Hilf (Mary of Succor) by Lucas Cranach the Elder from c. 1530. Originally belonging to a gallery of paintings owned by the Electorate of Saxony in Dresden, this unique image of the Madonna and Child is filled with "the dignity of the Queen of Heaven, the charm of the Virgin and the gentleness of the mother." The painting, which typifies the Baroque veneration of the Virgin Mary, was a gift from John George I, Elector of Saxony to Archduke Leopold V, and has resided in the church since 1650. On workdays, it is framed by Joseph Schopf's 1789 painting of Saint James and Saint Alexius venerating the Virgin Mary. On feast days, the painting is surrounded by silver angels and golden rays. Maria Hilf remains among the most venerated Marian images in Christendom.

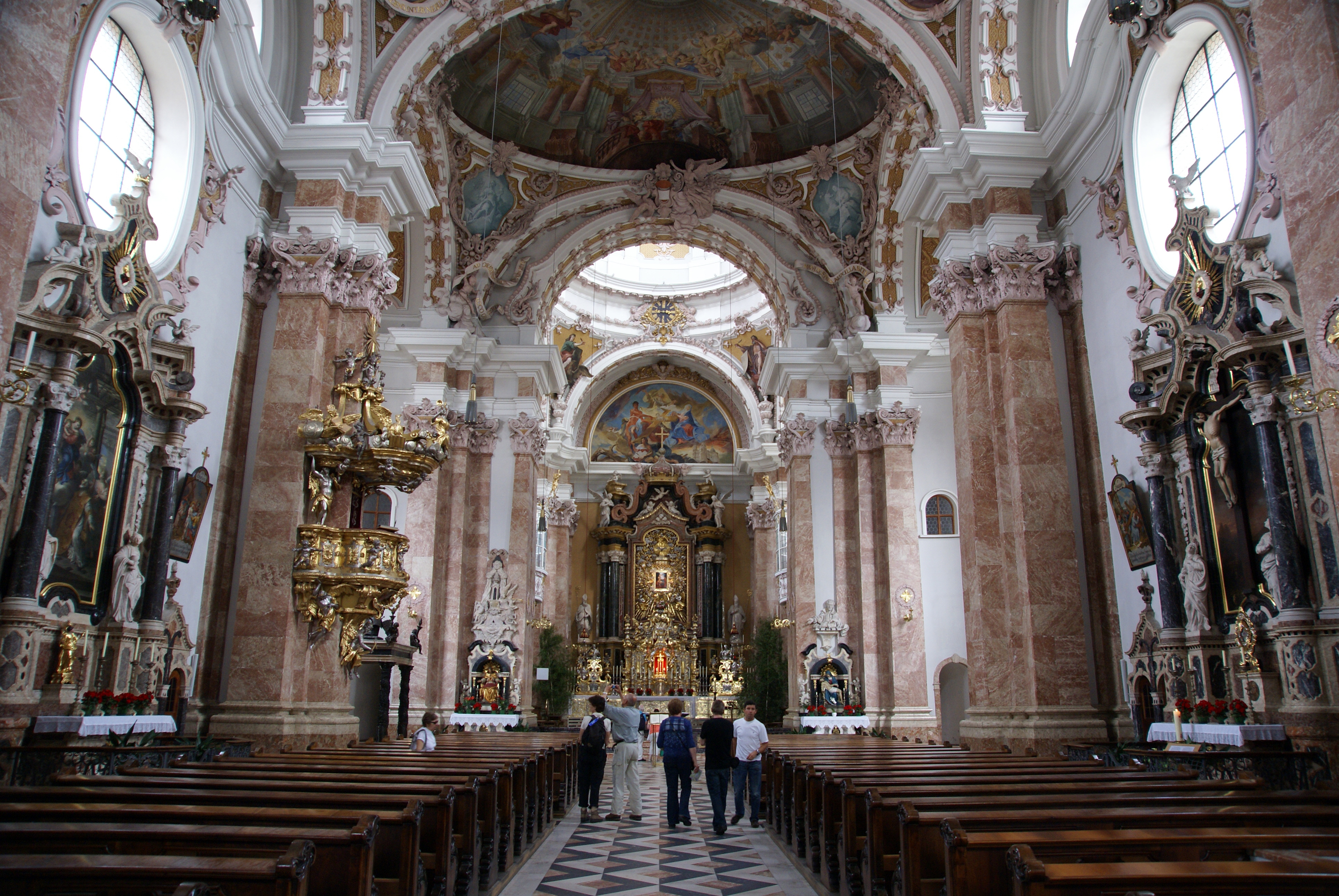
Side altars and pulpit

The cathedral contains six large side altars in the nave and transept—three on each side—that were donated to the church by brotherhoods and private donors. The two altars closest to the entrance in the first bay contain panels by the Brixen court artist Johann Georg Dominikus Grasmair. The north side (left) altar shows Saint Sebastian, the patron protector of the plague who is especially venerated in the Tyrol, flanked by statues of Saint Charles Borromeo and Saint Nicholas. The south altar shows Saint John of Nepomuk, the patron saint of bridges and the second patron saint of the Tyrol. In the second bay, the north altar contains a Baroque painting from 1673 by Egid Schor—an Innsbruck artist who was trained in Rome. The painting, which is from the old parish church, depicts Saint Philip Neri before the Virgin Mary. The painting is framed by marble statues of Saint Catherine of Siena and Saint Barbara, with a gilded statue of Saint Apollonia. The south side altar is dominated by a late Gothic crucifix of high quality, dating to the early sixteenth century. The Baroque statues depicting Mary and John are attributed to Stefan Folger.

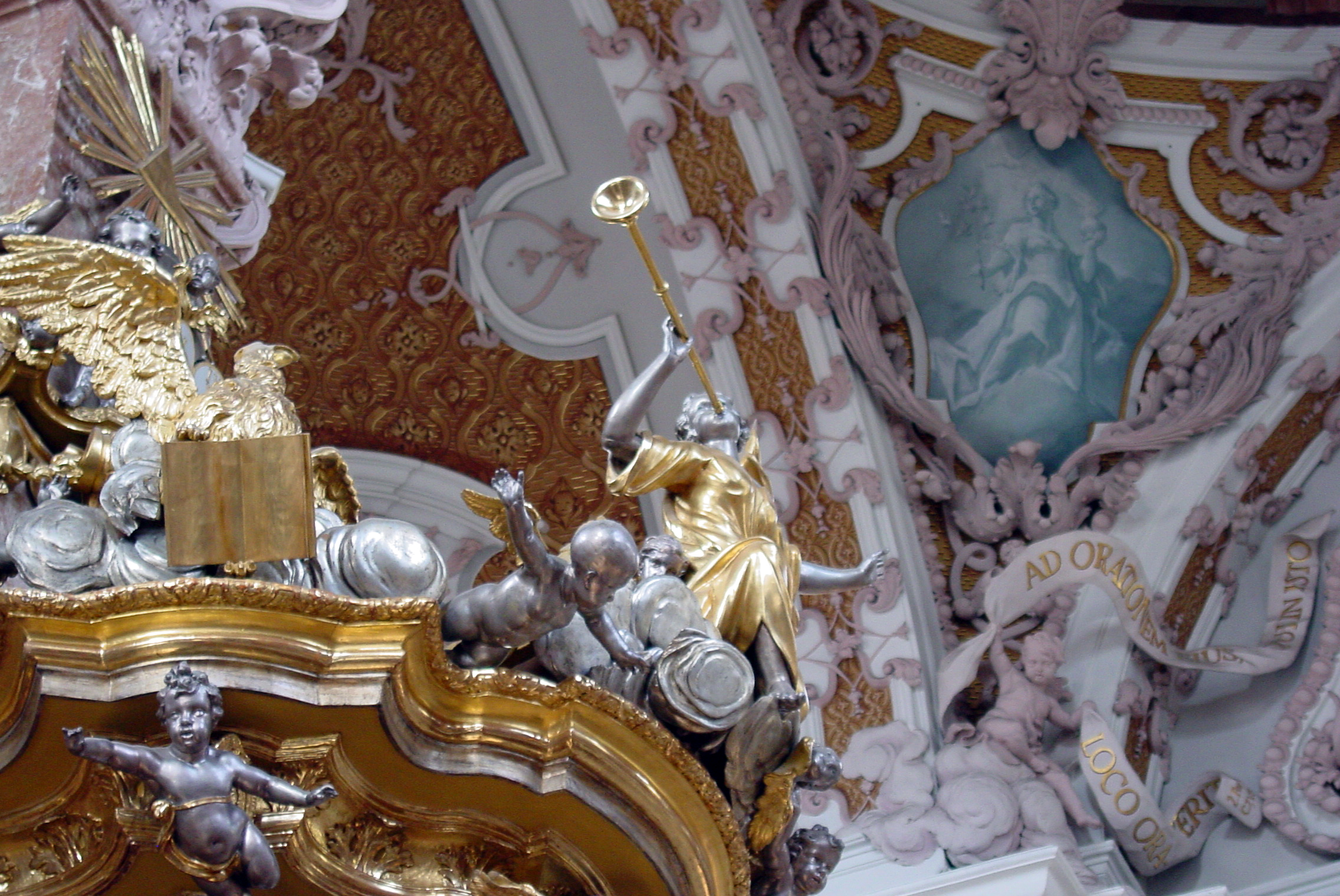
Pulpit sounding board by Nikolaus Moll

The north transept side altar contains a painting of the Assumption of Mary by Grasmair, with statues of Saint Joseph and Saint Joachim. The south transept side altar contains a copy of Grasmair's painting of Saint Anne with the infant Jesus—the original was destroyed during World War II. The two small side altars by the chancel arch contain Nazarene figures created by Dominikus Trenkwalder in 1893. The one on the left side contains a Baroque memorial tablet commemorating Kaspar Ignaz Count Kunigl, Prince Bishop of Brixen, who dedicated the church in 1724; the one on the right side shows Saint Peter Canisius, the patron of the Diocese of Innsbruck who played an important role in clarifying the Catholic faith in Austria during the Counter-Reformation.

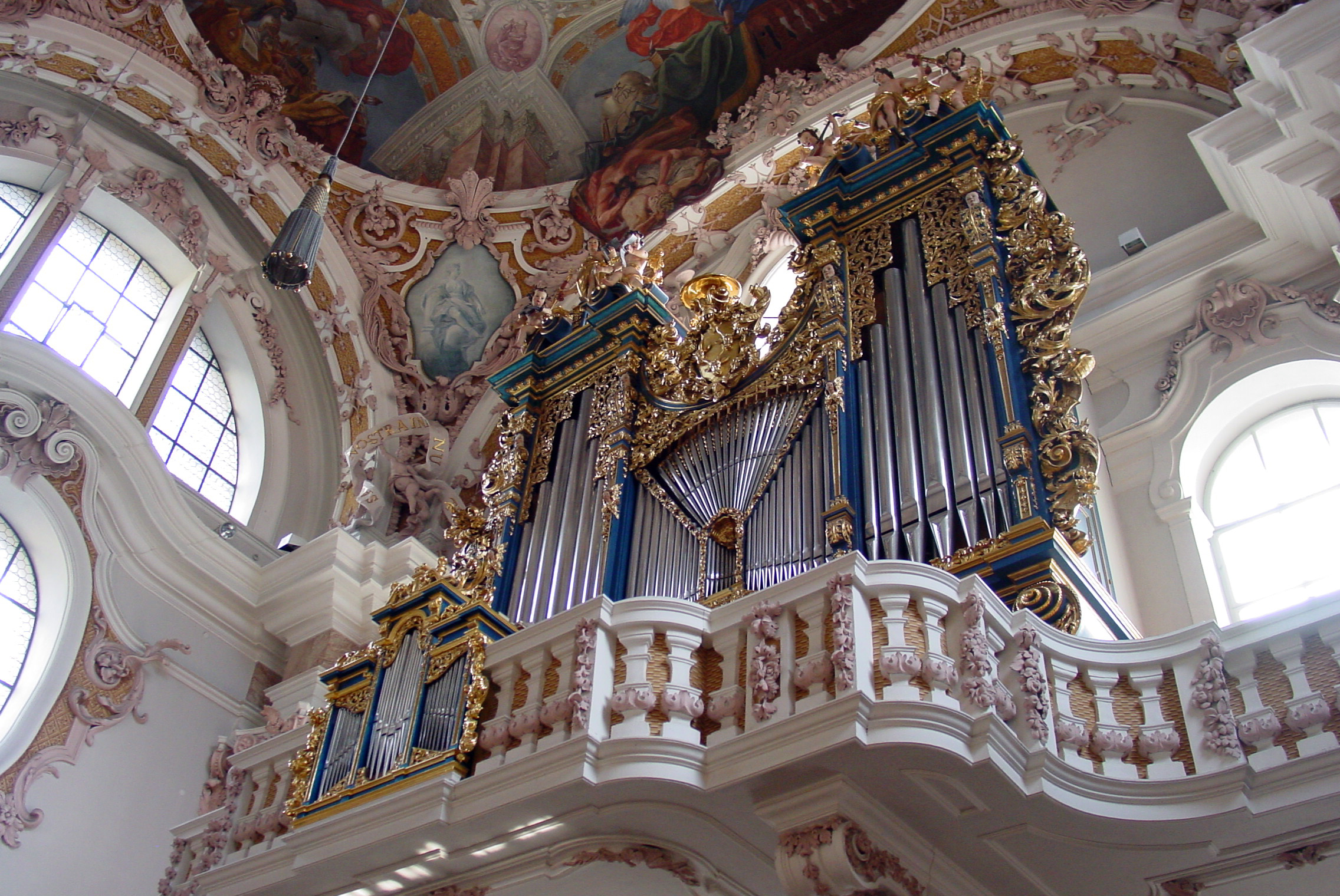
Organ front by Nikolaus Moll

The pulpit by Innsbruck sculptor Nikolaus Moll (Note: Nikolaus Moll's son, Balthasar Ferdinand Moll, sculpted twenty tombs for the Habsburg imperial family in the Imperial Crypt in Vienna, including his masterpiece, the elaborate double sarcophagus in Rococo style of Empress Maria Theresa and her husband Emperor Franz I Stephan on which Moll worked from 1751 to 1772.) is a Baroque masterpiece from 1725. Gilded and silver-plated throughout, the pulpit is adorned by three divine virtues supporting the base, symbols of the four Evangelists, and a host of angels and cherubs on the sounding board. The base of the pulpit displays the Zech-Fieger coat of arms. Moll also carved the magnificent organ front, which dominates the west end of the cathedral. Serving as a pendant to the high altar, the organ's richly gilded casing, with its rigorous carving work and top piece with figure decorations, is regarded as one of the loveliest Baroque organs in the Tyrol. The organ front bears the coat of arms of its donor, Dr. Matthias Tausch.

Completing the cathedral's unified Baroque interior are 14 stations of the cross painted by the Baroque artist Michael Ignaz Mildorfer from Innsbruck. Completed in 1734, these two-meter high works of art originally adorned the walls of the former convent church in Innsbruck.

== Tomb of Archduke Maximilian III ==
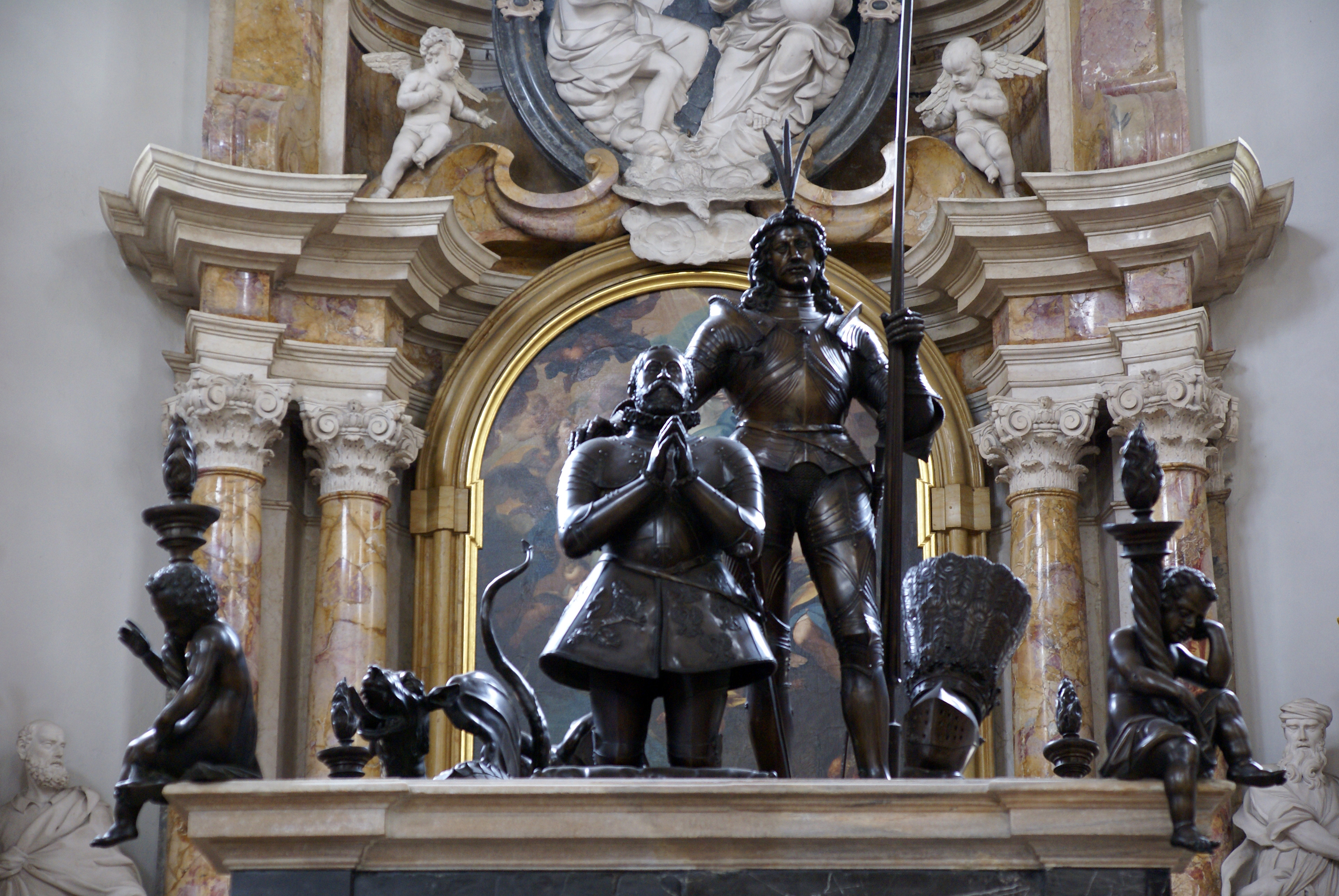
Tomb of Archduke Maximilian III of Austria

In the left arm of the transept stands the canopied tomb of Archduke Maximilian III of Austria, Grand Master of the Teutonic Knights. Commissioned by the ruler of Tyrol, this work of "great artistic and historical significance" was modelled by Hubert Gerhard and Caspar Gras, and cast by Heinrich Reinhard in 1618. In 1629, the tomb was erected in the side chapel of the old parish church. When the church was rebuilt in the early eighteenth century, the canopy was divided into two sections that framed the two sacristy doors. In 1950, as part of the post-war restoration, the two sections were reassembled above the tomb in its present location.

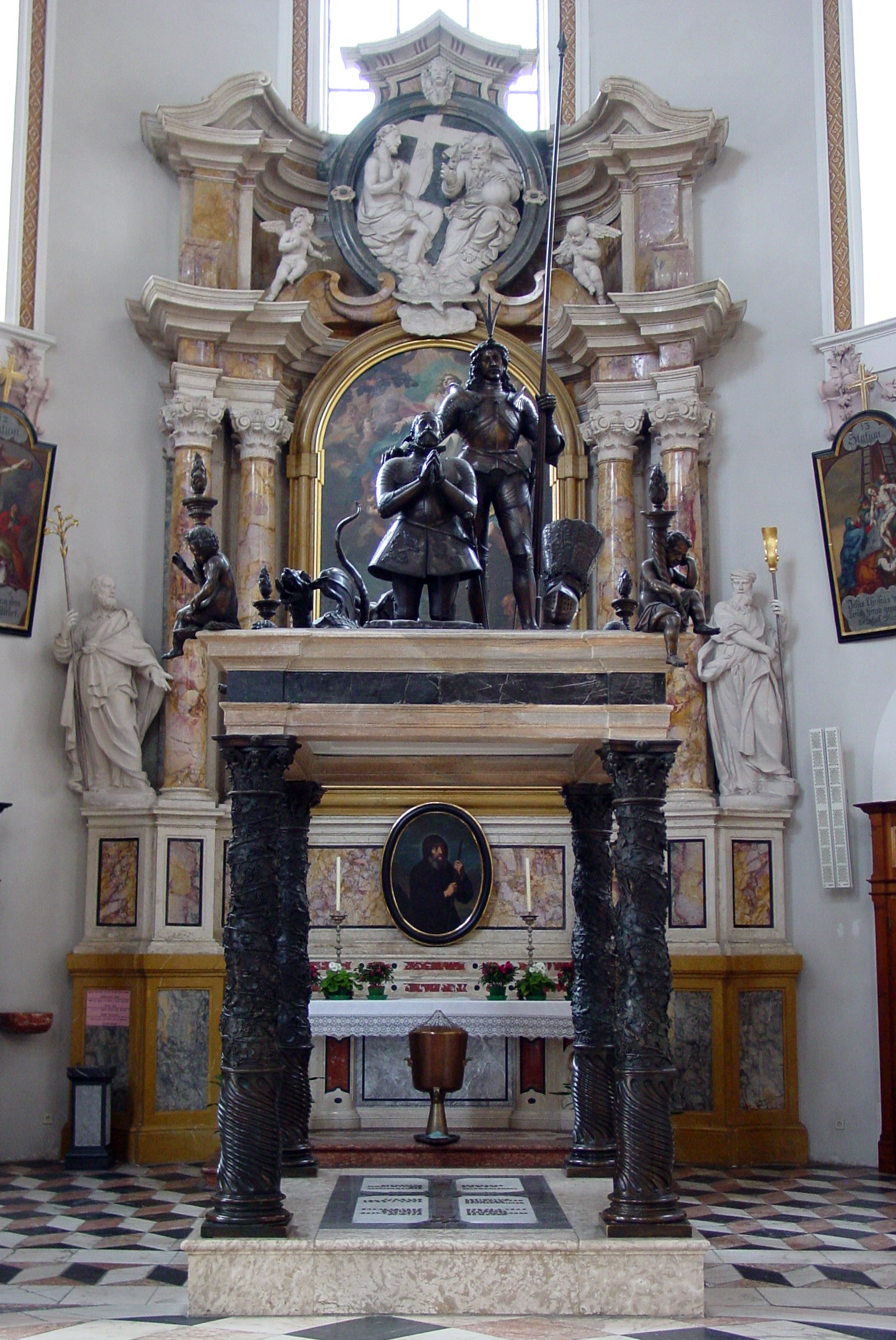
Tomb of Archduke Maximilian III of Austria

Acting as a type of ciborium, the canopy consists of four turned bronze columns, adorned with vine leaves, birds, and small animals. The columns, which have fluted bases and finely cut composite capitals, support a heavy profiled marble entablature, which serves as both an abacus and as a stand for the group of four bronze figures. Dressed in armour, a bareheaded Archduke Maximilian kneels on a cushion with his hands folded in prayer. Saint George stands behind him—his hand resting on the archduke's shoulder. Behind the saint, the slain dragon slithers away. At the two front corners of the entablature are two mourning figures with torches. This group of precisely modelled, immaculately cast bronze figures "exemplify Austrian Mannerist sculpture of the highest quality." The tomb also commemorates the last Grand Master of the Teutonic Order, Archduke Eugen, who was buried here in 1954.

Born at Wiener Neustadt in 1558, Maximilian III was the fourth son of Emperor Maximilian II and Empress Maria of Austria. In 1585, he became the Grandmaster of the Teutonic Order, and thereafter was known by the epithet "the German Master" (der Deutschmeister). In 1587, he was a candidate for the throne of the Polish–Lithuanian Commonwealth, and a portion of the Polish nobility elected him king. As a result of a chaotic election process, however, another candidate was also elected. Maximilian attempted to resolve the dispute by military means, thereby starting the War of the Polish Succession. Although he had considerable support in Poland, his rival attracted more supporters. After a failed attempt to storm Kraków in late 1587, Maximilian was defeated at the Battle of Byczyna in January 1588, and taken captive. He was only released through the intervention of Pope Sixtus V. In 1589, he formally renounced his claim to the Polish crown. In 1595, he succeeded his uncle Ferdinand II as Archduke of Further Austria and Governor of Tyrol, where he proved to be a solid proponent of the Counter-Reformation. Maximilian died at Vienna in 1618, and was buried in the canopied tomb in Innsbruck Cathedral.

== Bells ==
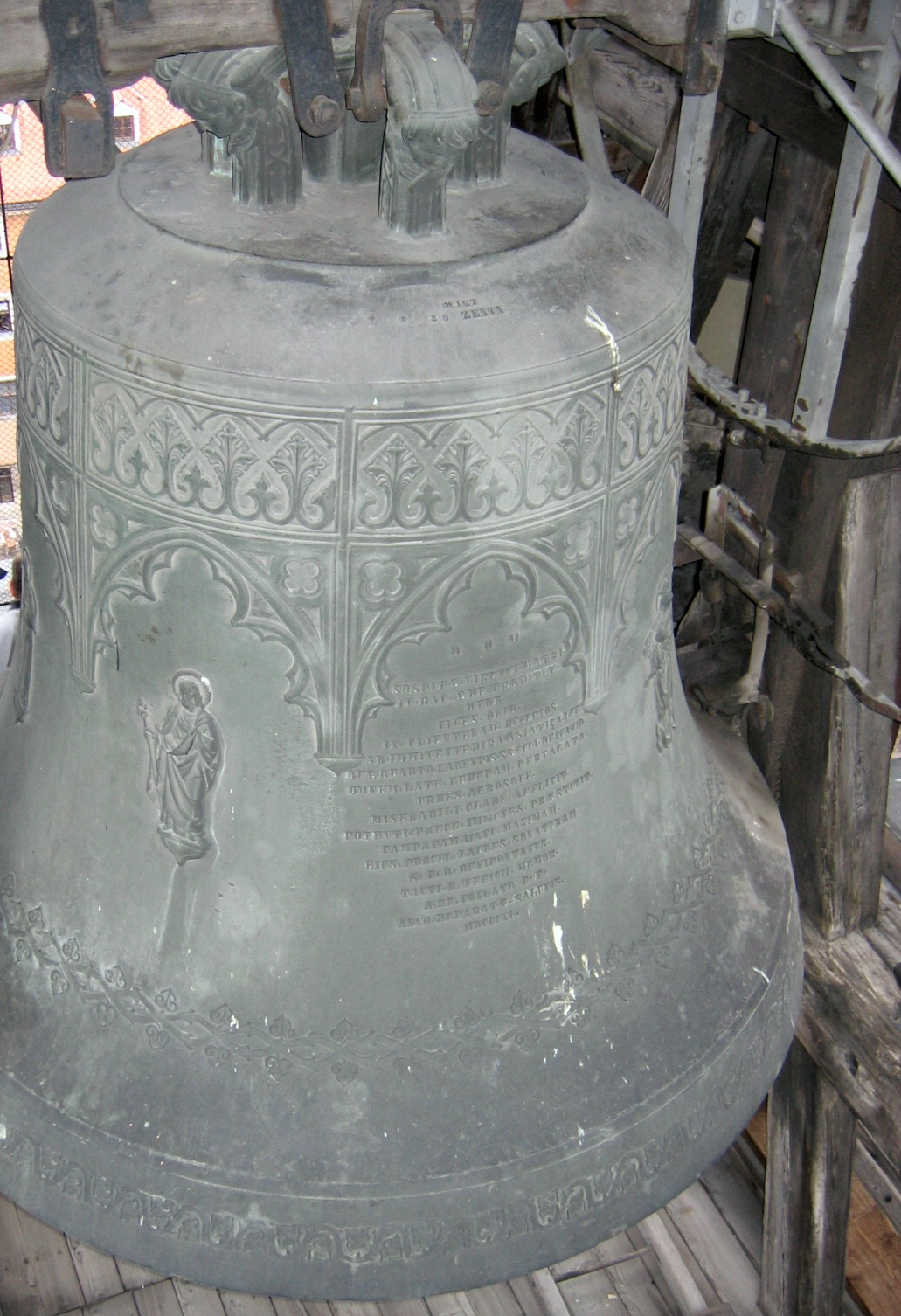
Mariahilfglocke (Große Pfarrglocke), 1846.

The cathedral contains eight bells, the largest bell or bourdon is called the Mariahilfglocke (Große Pfarrglocke) and it is the second largest historic bell in Tyrol. It was cast in 1846 by the Grassmayr Bell Foundry. The Mariahilfglocke has a diameter of 2,210 mm (87 in) and weighs 6,342 kg (13,982 lb). The bourdon is housed in the north tower of the cathedral and tolls every Friday at 3:00 pm to note the hour Jesus died. In 1961 and 1965, seven new bells were cast by Johann Grassmayr from Grassmayr Bell Foundry and acquired by the cathedral for the south tower—six dedicated to various saints and the seventh named Totenglocke (Death knell). Two of the eight bells serve as clock bells, Bell 3 strikes every quarter hour, and the bourdon strikes the number of a full hour. During Angelus, the hour chime is not played. In Austria, the bells are always numbered from largest to smallest, Bell 1 is always the tenor or bourdon.

In 1982, the Innsbruck peace carillon was added to the north tower, consisting of 48 bells, making it the largest and most extensive carillon in Austria. The Innsbruck peace carillon has a total weight of 4,100 kg (9,000 lb) and was cast by the Royal Eijsbouts bell foundry. The peace carillon, which sounds daily around 12:10 pm, is the only carillon in Austria with a range of four octaves. It is part of the War Memorial and Peace Carillons network.

| Bell Number | Bell Name {German} | Bell Name {International} | Weight (kg) |
|---|---|---|---|
| 1 | Mariahilfglocke/Große Pfarrglocke (Bourdon Bell) | Mariahilf Bell/Large Parish Bell | 6342 |
| 2 | Priminus | | 3123 |
| 3 | Josef und Georg | Joseph and George | 1674 |
| 4 | Paulus | Paul | 2121 |
| 5 | Anna und Petrus Canisius | Anna and Peter Canisius | 1020 |
| 6 | Matthäus | Matthew | 475 |
| 7 | Christophorus und Homobonus | Christopher and Homobonus | 356 |
| 8 | Totenglocke | Death knell | 202 |

== Gallery ==
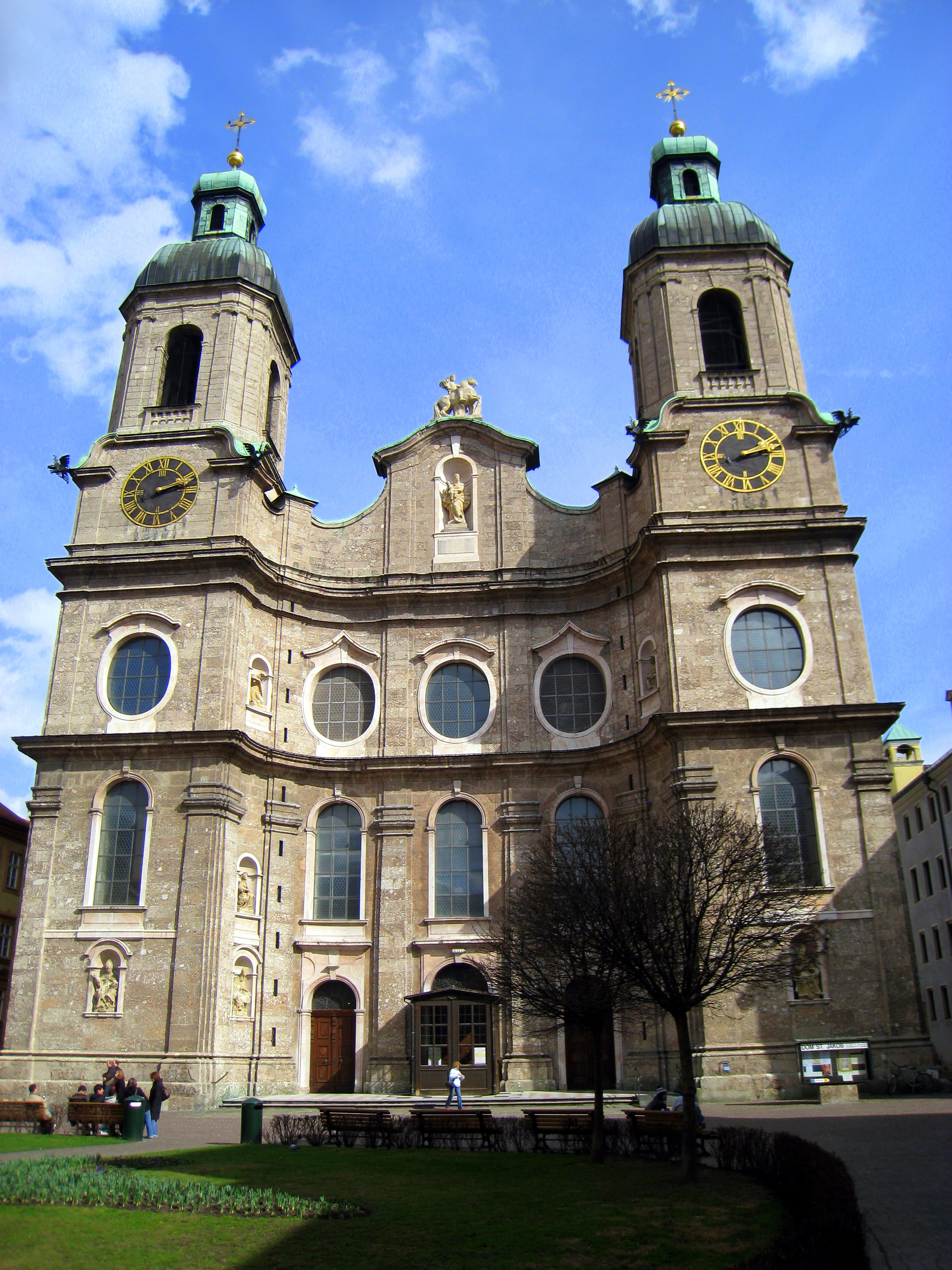
Innsbruck Cathedral

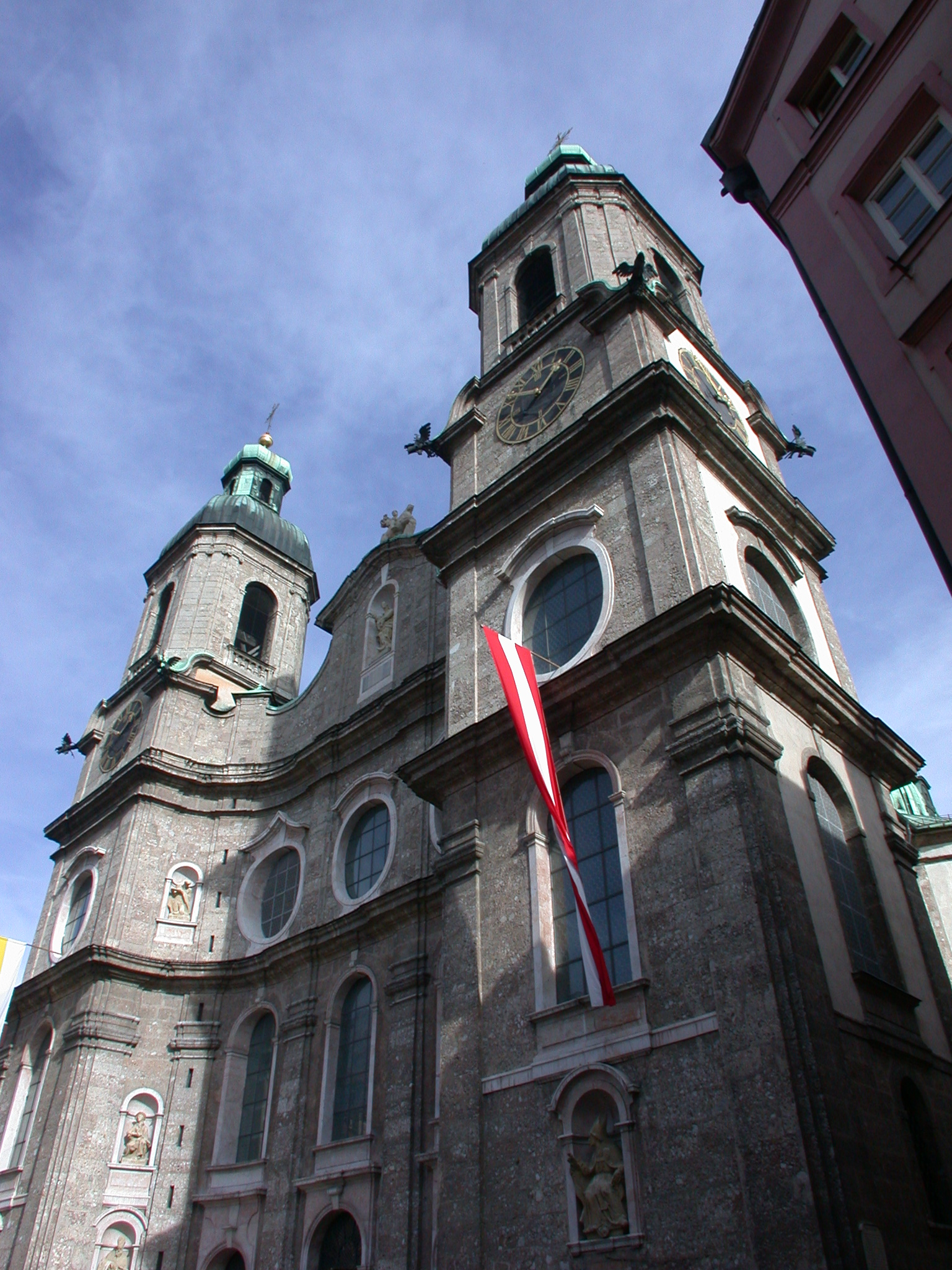
Innsbruck Cathedral

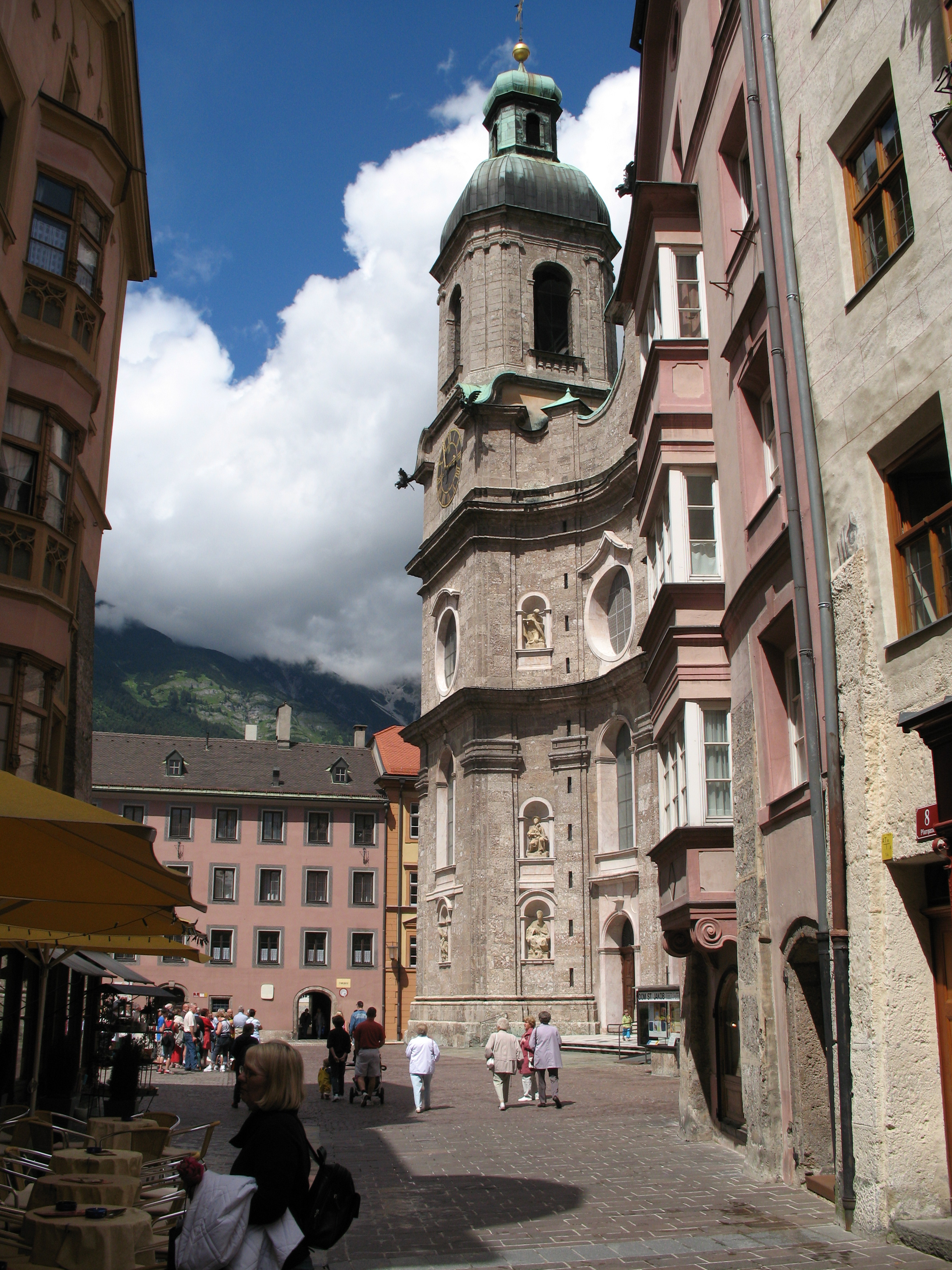
Pfarrgasse

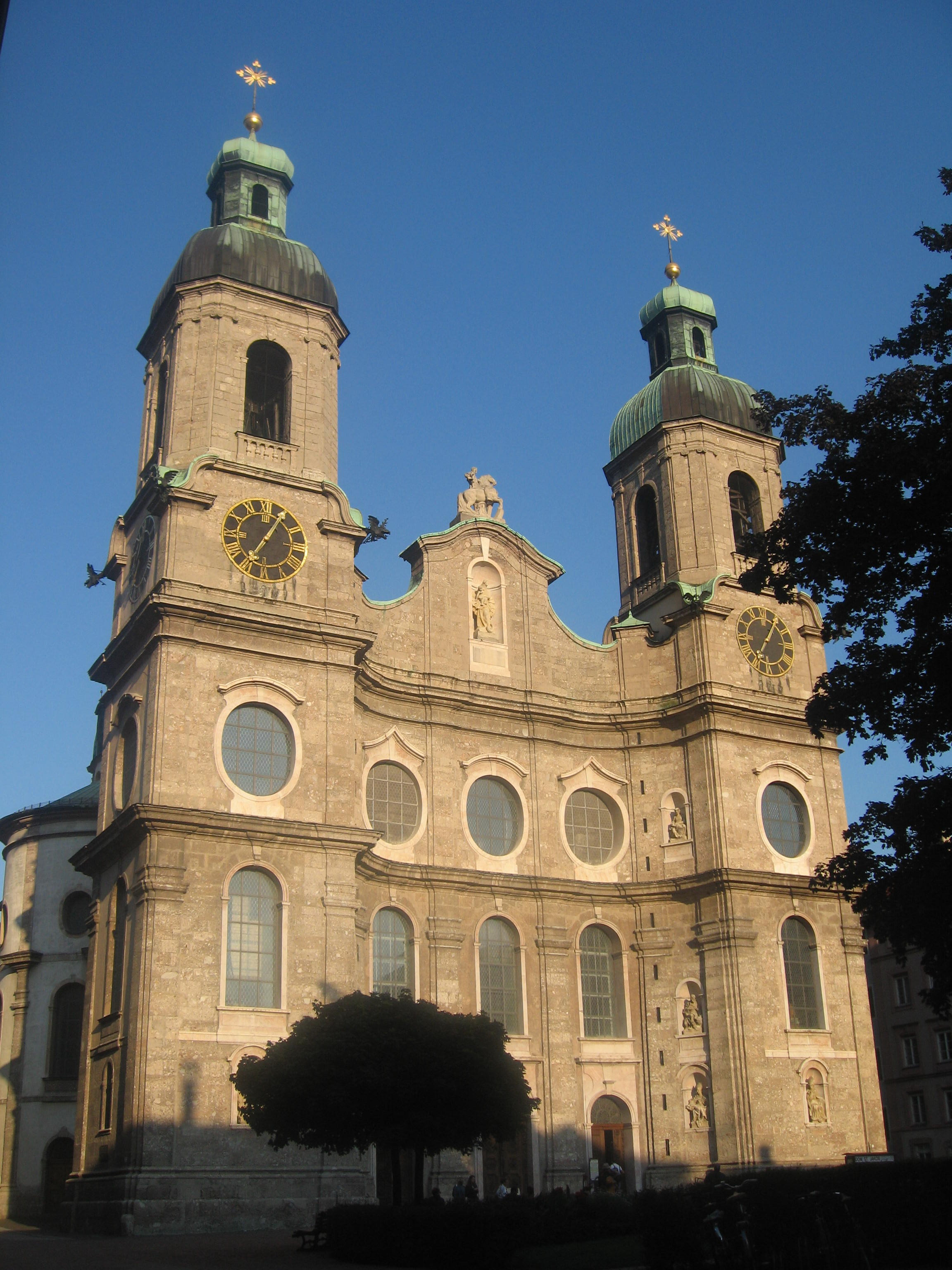
Domplatz

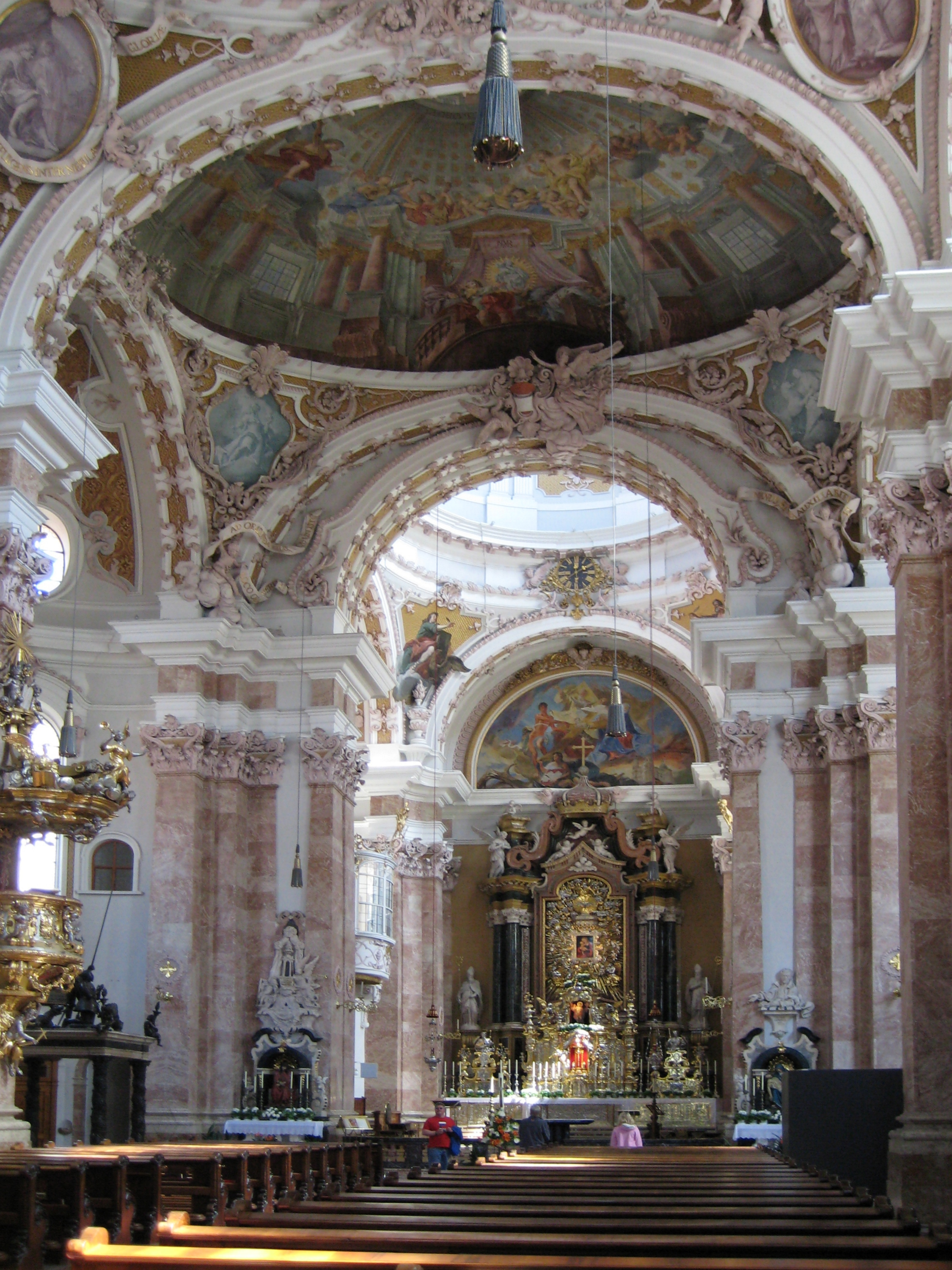
Cathedral interior

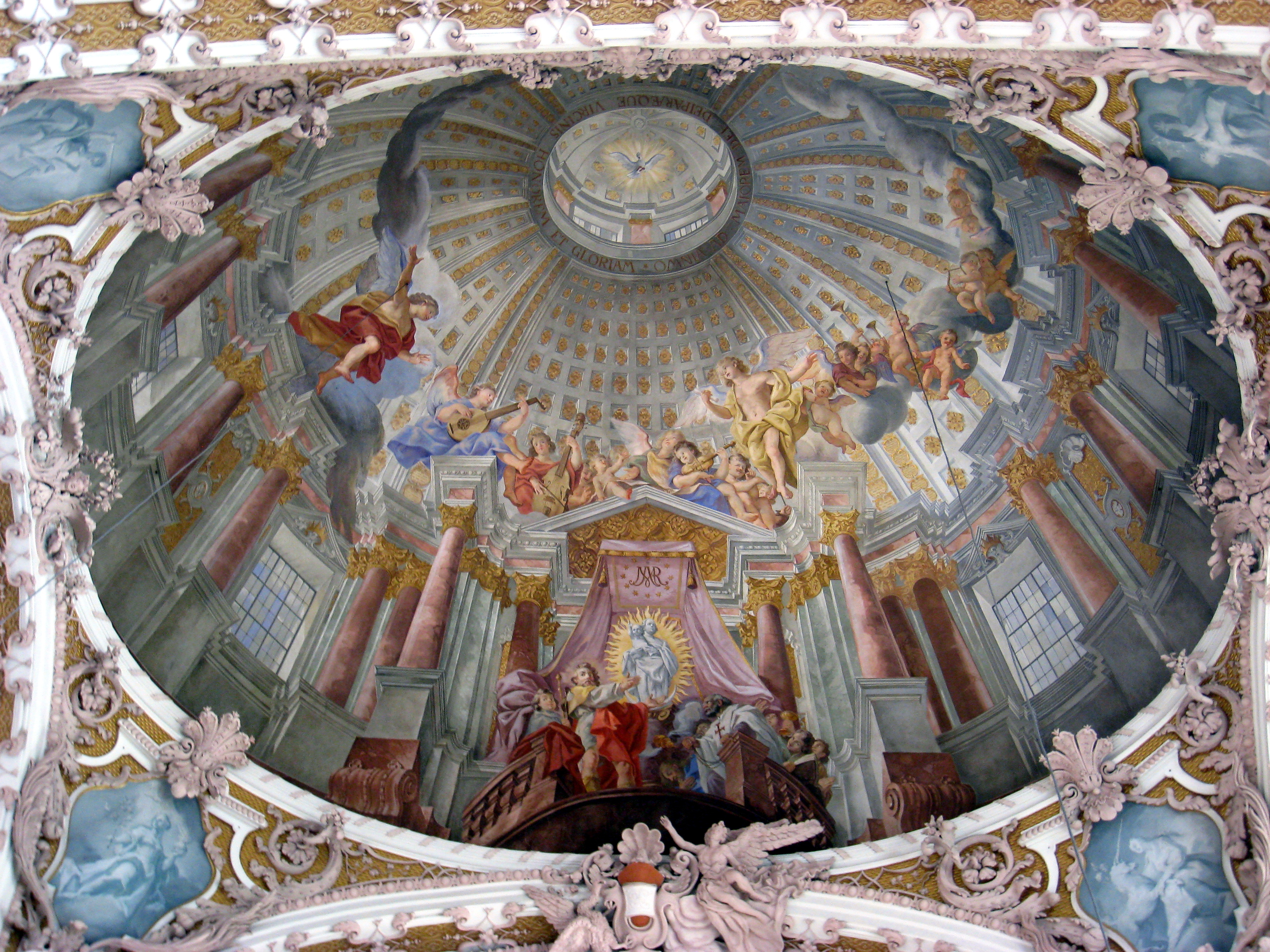
Dome fresco

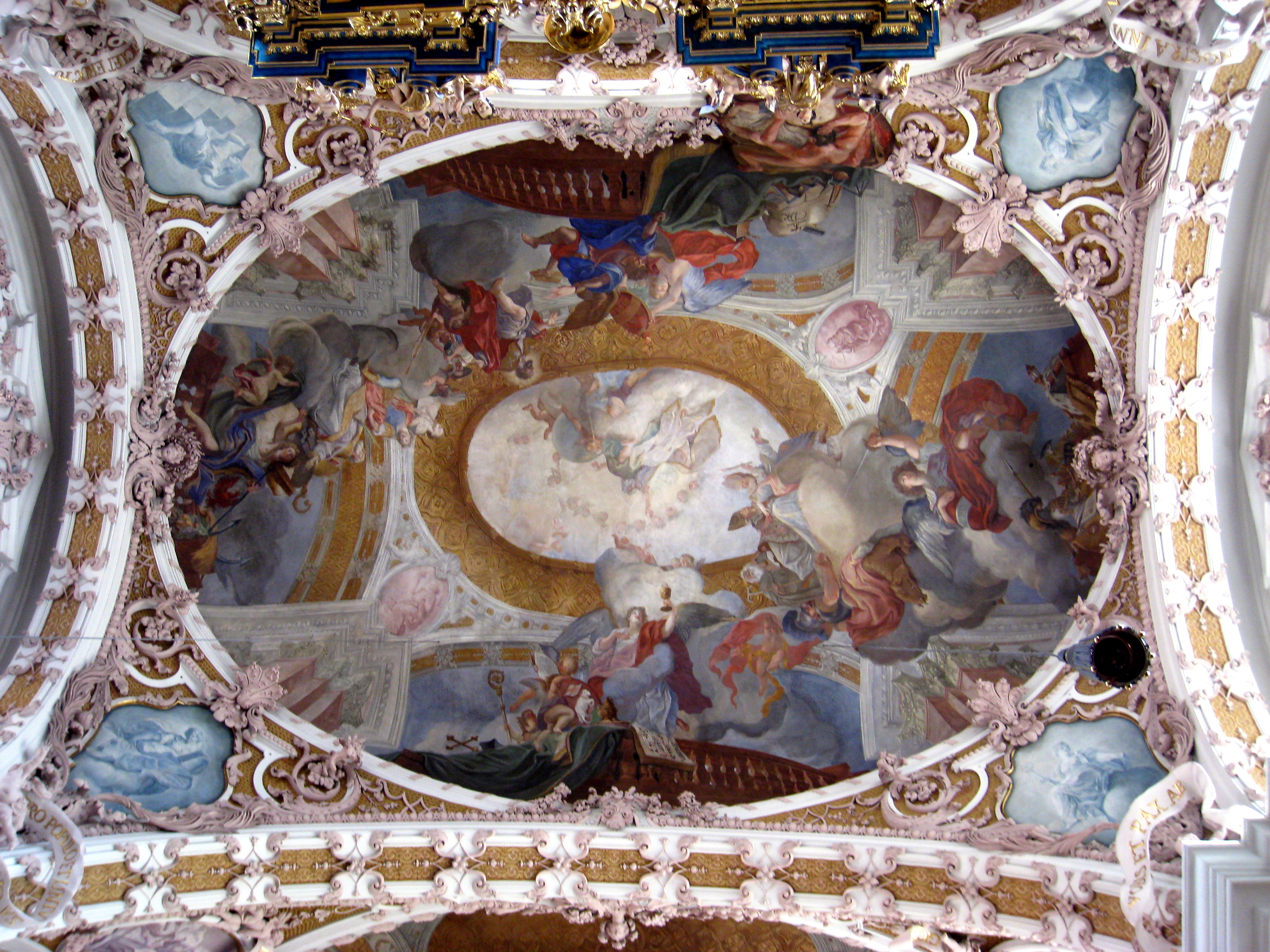
Ceiling frescos

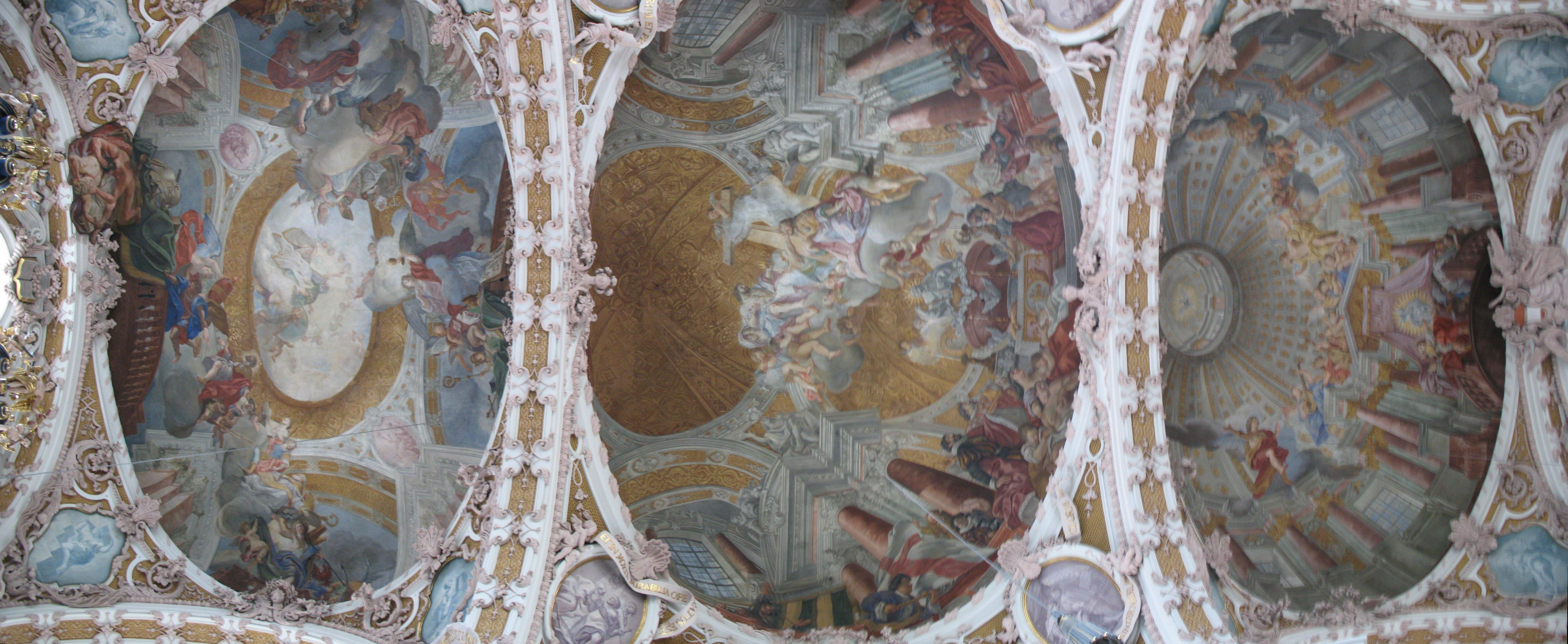
Ceiling frescos

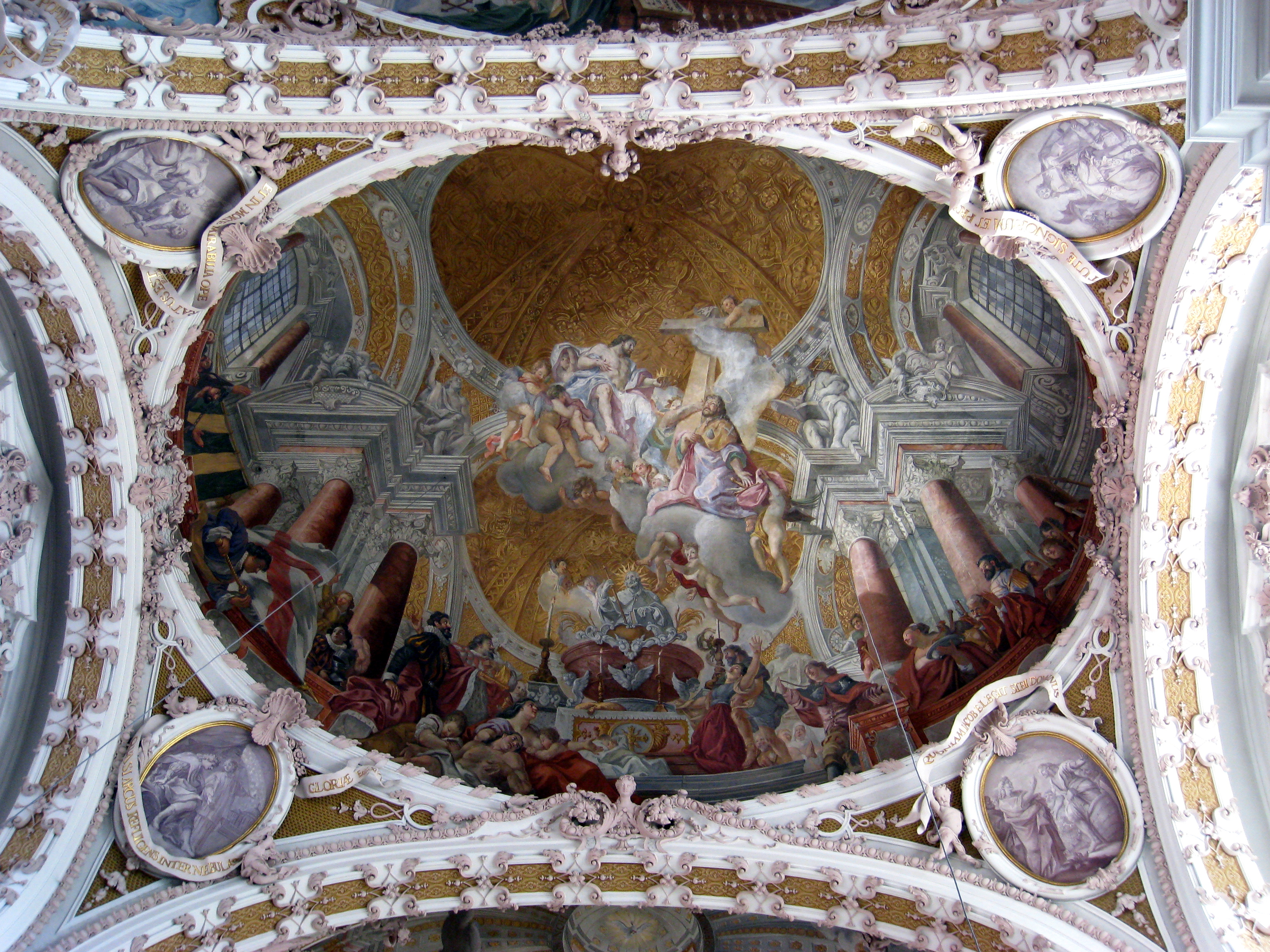
Ceiling frescos

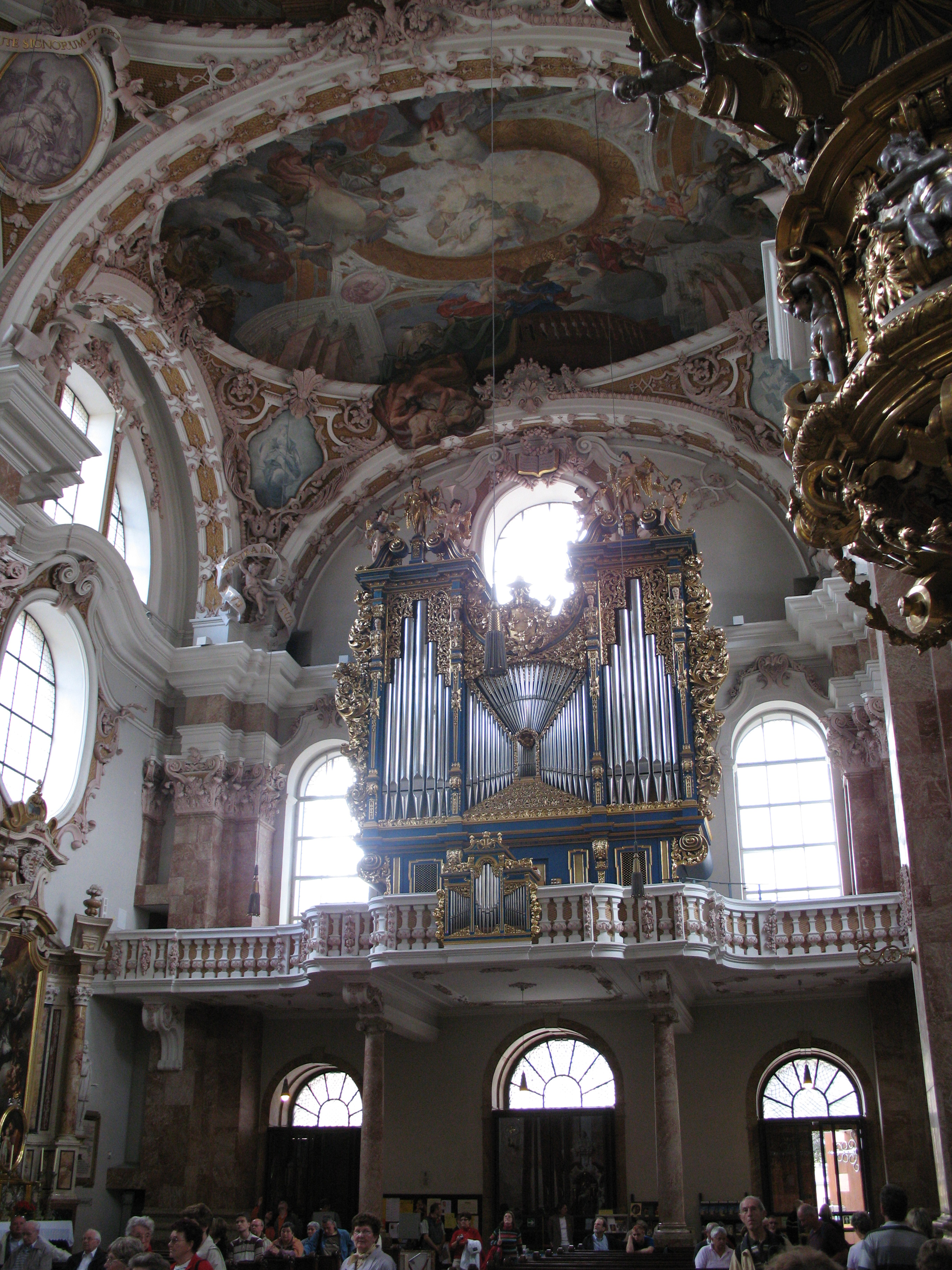
Organ loft

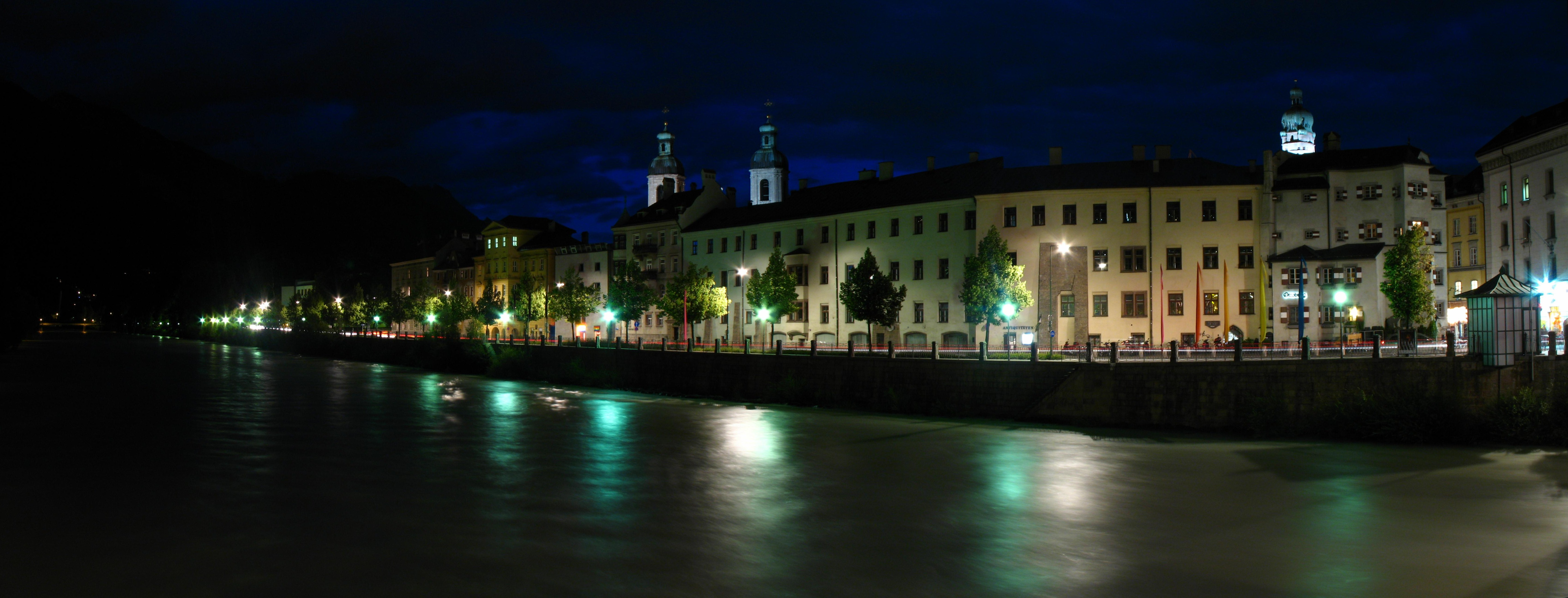
Cathedral towers at night

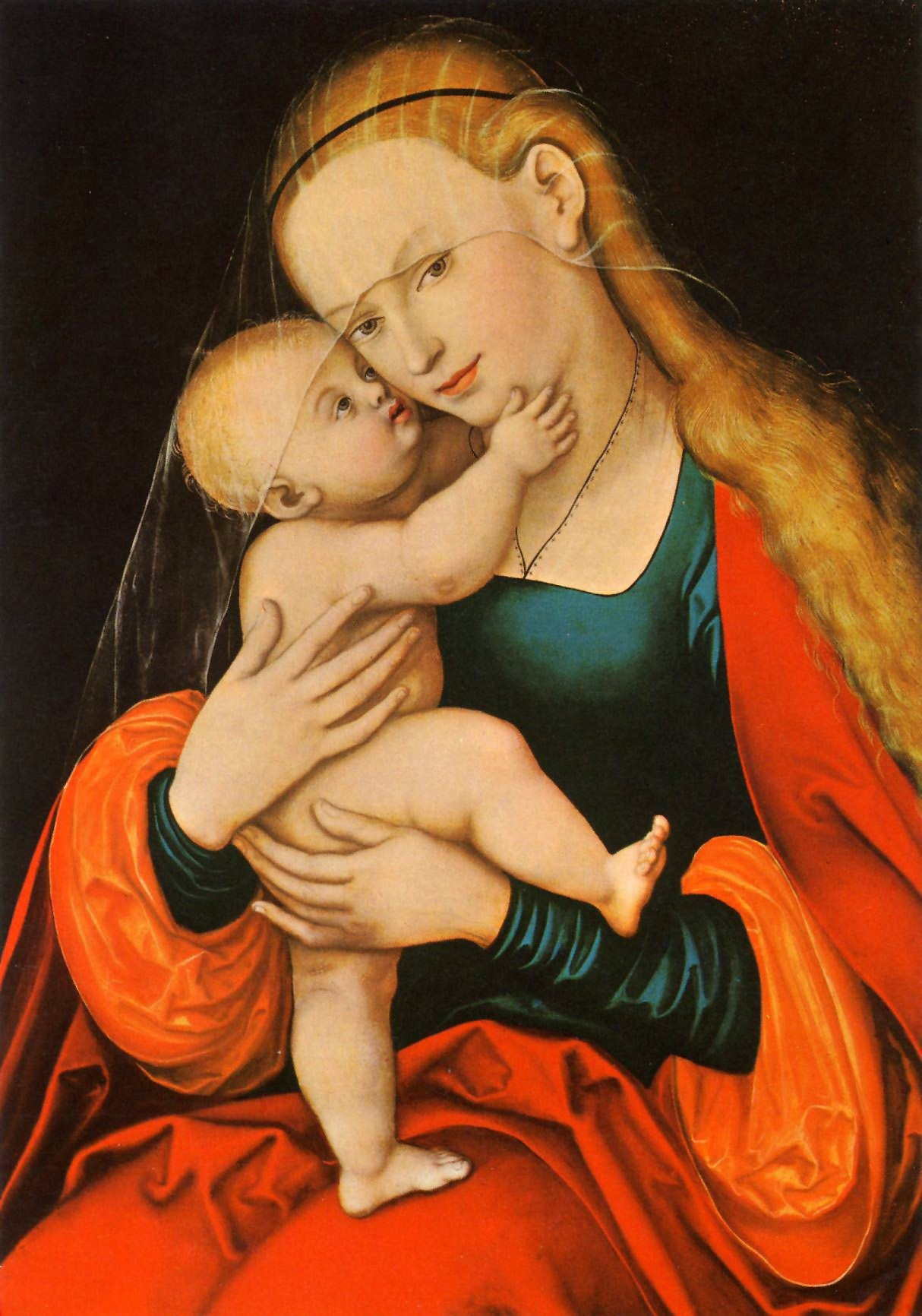
Maria Hilf by Lucas Cranach the Elder, c. 1530

== See also ==
- List of carillons
