= Bombing of Innsbruck in World War II =

Innsbruck, an Austrian city, was annexed by Nazi Germany in 1938. It was bombed 22 times by the Allies in World War II, suffering heavy damage.

== Background ==
The widespread area bombing of Innsbruck began in December 1943 and went on until April 1945. Innsbruck is a main transport hub where four rail lines (Arlbergbahn from the west, Mittenwaldbahn from the north, Westbahn from the east and Brennerbahn from the south), converge. A key function as a railroad supply center for Italy made Innsbruck an important strategic target for the Allies.

Until autumn 1943, Innsbruck was too far away for the Allied air forces. With the establishment of the Fifteenth Air Force (15th AF) in November 1943, the success of "Operation Husky" (the name for the Allied invasion of Sicily) and the subsequent construction of several bases near Foggia in Italy, the city was then in range.

== Timeline ==
Date of raid	Casualties	Damaged buildings	Comments
15 December 1943	259	472	301st Bombardment Group Heavy; 97th Bomb Group – Mission #205
19 December 1943	65	264	301st Bombardment Group Heavy; 97th Bomb Group – Mission #206; 98th Bomb Group
13 June 1944	1	42	484th Bombardment Group Mission #31; 484th Bombardment Group (H) – Mission #31
20 October 1944	28	320	
26 October 1944	1	33	301st Bombardment Group Heavy; 463rd Bombardment Group – Mission #124
15 November 1944	–	4	450th Bombardment Group – Mission #175 – Narrative Report; 461st Bombardment Group (H) – Mission #132; 484th Bombardment Group – Mission #112
16 November 1944	12	168	463rd Bombardment Group – Mission #136
25 November 1944	1	13	
30 November 1944	–	2	
3 December 1944	–	–	461st Bombardment Group (H) – Mission #143; 484th Bombardment Group (H) – Mission #122
7 December 1944	2	28	450th Bombardment Group – Mission #189 – Narrative Report; 461st Bombardment Group (H) – Mission #145; 484th Bombardment Group (H) – Mission #124
15 December 1944	4	95	376th Heavy Bomb Group, – Mission Report by M. R. Gerszewski
16 December 1944	40	798	450th Bombardment Group Mission #194 – Narrative Report
19 December 1944	–	56	
25 December 1944	1	142	450th Bombardment Group – Mission #200 – Narrative Report
29 December 1944	9	265	463rd Bombardment Group – Mission #156
14 February 1945	–	2	
16 February 1945	–	36	
27 February 1945	4	27	
7 April 1945	6	111	
10 April 1945	27	262	No. 205 Group RAF
20 April 1945	1	7	
22 Raids	461	3147	

== History ==
The first two raids, on 15 and 19 December 1943, were unexpected: the residents of Innsbruck did not use the air-raid shelters so there was a high death toll (259 + 65 people killed). During the next six months attacks were suspended by the Allies because of preparations for Operation Overlord in Normandy, in France. In this break the military and urban administration of Innsbruck rearranged the anti-aircraft defenses and expanded the air raid shelters. These shelters were mainly constructed by forced labor from the Arbeitslager Reichenau in Innsbruck. 25 underground shelters with a total length of 11.2 km and space for 28,755 civilians were built in 1944.

The third attack, on 13 June 1944, concentrated on the marshalling yards in Innsbruck. 37 aircraft of the 484th Bomber Group/5th Wing of the 15th Air Force were originally destined for targets in Bavaria (Oberpfaffenhofen near Starnberg, Allach near Munich, Milbershofen near Dachau and Neuaubing near Munich). Due to bad weather conditions and strong air defenses over Munich, Innsbruck was the alternate target. The narrative report of Mission 31 states:

Maybe men had been wounded, but remained heroically at the assigned posts. Approaching the target, for the second time on this mission the formation encountered heavy, intense and accurate anti-aircraft fire. In the face [of] repeated bursts of murderous enemy gun-fire, the group leader kept his remaining force intact and led the formation on a perfect bombing run for a brilliant piece of precision bombing.

The bomber group, with about 350 crew members, suffered heavy losses: four killed, four wounded and 54 missing. 56 tons of bombs killed two civilians, and destroyed the marshalling yards and the Wilten monastery. The bomber crews received a "Presidential Unit Citation".

The 13th attack on Innsbruck, on 16 December 1944, indicated a change in the strategic approach: a higher percentage of delayed-action and incendiary bombs (600 high explosive and 45 delayed-action bombs and 12,000 incendiaries). Innsbruck was no longer treated as a strategic target. The high number of civil buildings destroyed and the high death toll (40 persons killed) indicates "morale bombing".

The 21st attack, on 10 April 1945, was the only night operation. This raid was carried out not by the USAAF but by No. 205 Group RAF. 31 people were killed.

The war ended in Innsbruck on 3 May 1945, when units of the US 103rd Infantry Division entered the city. Before, Gauleiter Franz Hofer had delivered a radio speech and forbidden any resistance. From December 1943 to April 1945, 60 percent of the buildings in Innsbruck were damaged and 461 people were killed.

Besides the marshalling yards, many historic monuments were destroyed, including: the Servitenkloster monastery (1614–1616) and the Bartholomäuskapelle, one of the oldest buildings in Innsbruck (13th century). The Landhaus or old federal state parliament of 1724, city hall, Innsbruck Cathedral (1717–1724), Stift Wilten monastery (1651–1667), the Jesuit Church (1627–1637) and several buildings in the historic center were badly damaged.
