= Bell 9801 =

Memorial bell for Prague cast in 2022

Coordinates: 50°4′20″N 14°24′49″E

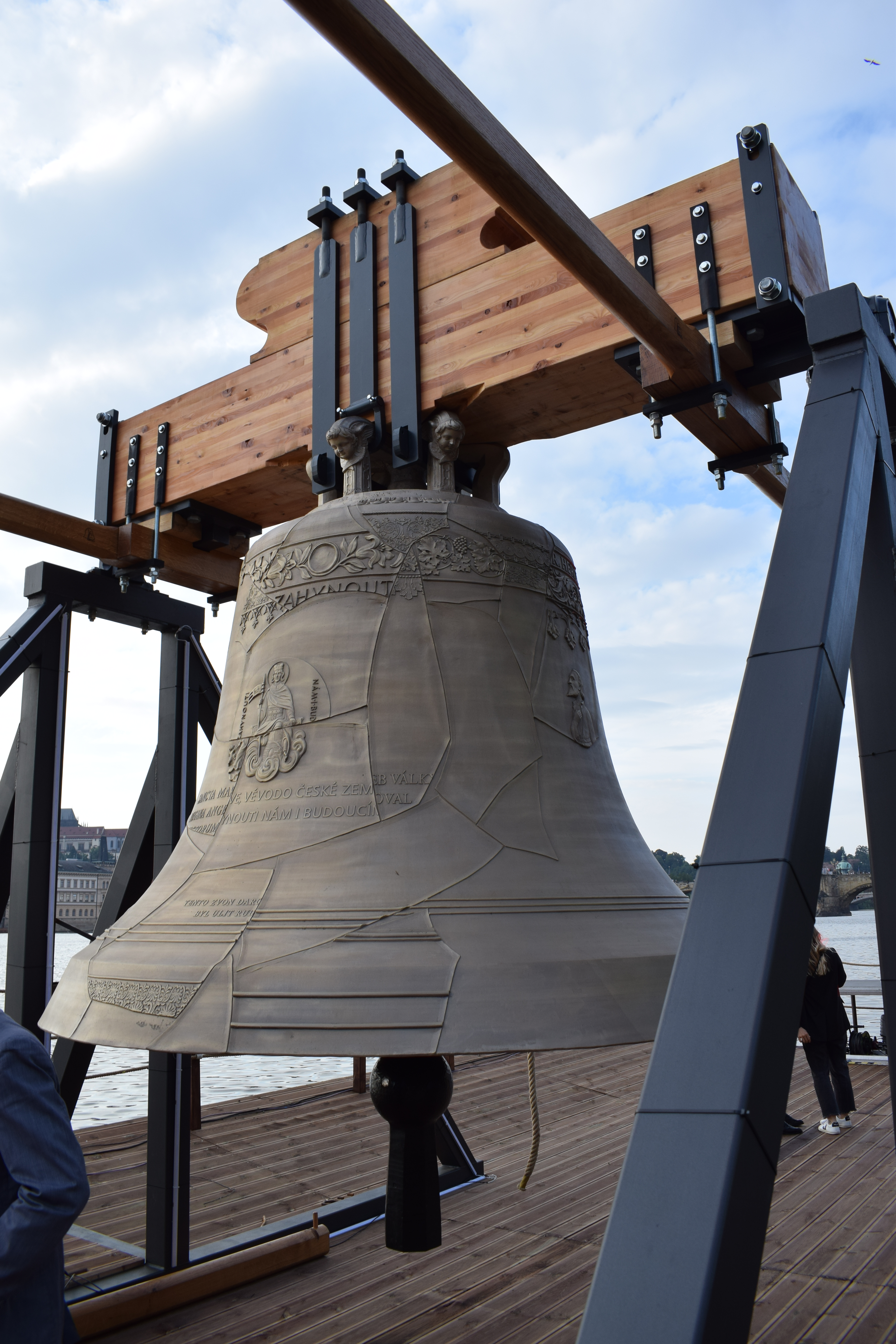
Bell #9801

Bell #9801 is a memorial bell for Prague cast in 2022 in the Grassmayr Bell Foundry. With its weight of 9,801 kg (21,608 lb), it is intended to refer to the 9,801 bells stolen by Nazi Germany during the Second World War in the Protectorate of Bohemia and Moravia for the purposes of the arms industry. The #9801 bell will be placed on Rohanský ostrov, the place where the bells were taken from the Protectorate of Bohemia and Moravia.

== Design ==
The design of the bell is based on a design by Prague bell ringers Kryštof Čižinský and Jakub Kamínek. On one side of the bell there are reliefs which are fragments from the stolen bells. On the other side there is an inscription in Czech. In Czech: Promlouvám hlasem tisíců zvonů, které umlčela válka. – which means I speak with the voice of a thousand bells silenced by war.

The bottom diameter of the bell is 258 cm (102 in). It is 187 cm (74 in) high (without the crown), the head adds another c. 126 cm (50 in). The weight of the heart is about 300 kg (660 lb).
