= Association of the Alpine States =

Association of 10 administrative divisions of Austria, Germany, Italy, and Switzerland

The Association of the Alpine States (German: Arbeitsgemeinschaft Alpenländer, abbr. Arge Alp; Italian: Comunità di Lavoro delle Regioni Alpine) is an association of 10 states, regions, provinces, and cantons of Austria, Germany, Italy, and Switzerland. The members are, from Austria: Salzburg, Tyrol, and Vorarlberg; from Germany: Bavaria; from Italy: Lombardy, South Tyrol, and Trentino; and from Switzerland: Graubünden, St. Gallen, and Ticino.

The association represents 23 million people within the area of about 142,000 km^{2}. It was founded on 12 October 1972 in Mösern, near Telfs in Tyrol.

Administrative division	Country	Capital	Population	Area (km²)	Pop. density	Municipalities
Bavaria	Germany	Munich	12,519,571	70,549.44	177.46	2,056
Graubünden	Switzerland	Chur	193,920	7,105.44	27.29	180
Lombardy	Italy	Milan	9,871,287	23,860.62	413.71	1,544
Salzburg	Austria	Salzburg	531,800	7,156.03	74.31	119
South Tyrol	Italy	Bolzano	511,750	7,399.97	69.16	116
St. Gallen	Switzerland	St. Gallen	486,981	2,025.54	240.42	77
Ticino	Switzerland	Bellinzona	341,652	2,812.2	121.49	135
Trentino	Italy	Trento	534,405	6,206.90	86.10	217
Tyrol	Austria	Innsbruck	708,900	12,640.17	56.08	279
Vorarlberg	Austria	Bregenz	370,200	2,601.12	142.32	96
Total			26,070,466	142,357.43	183.13	4,819

== See also ==
- Alpine states
