= Alpine states =

Countries associated with the region of Alps

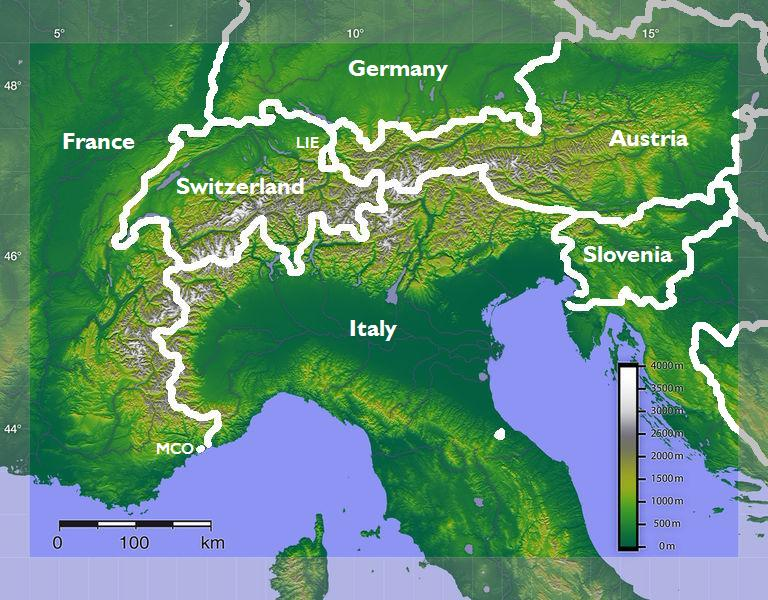
Eight Alpine states with international borders marked

The Alpine states or Alpine countries are eight countries associated with the Alpine region, as defined by the Alpine Convention of 1991: Austria, France, Germany, Italy, Liechtenstein, Monaco, Slovenia, and Switzerland.

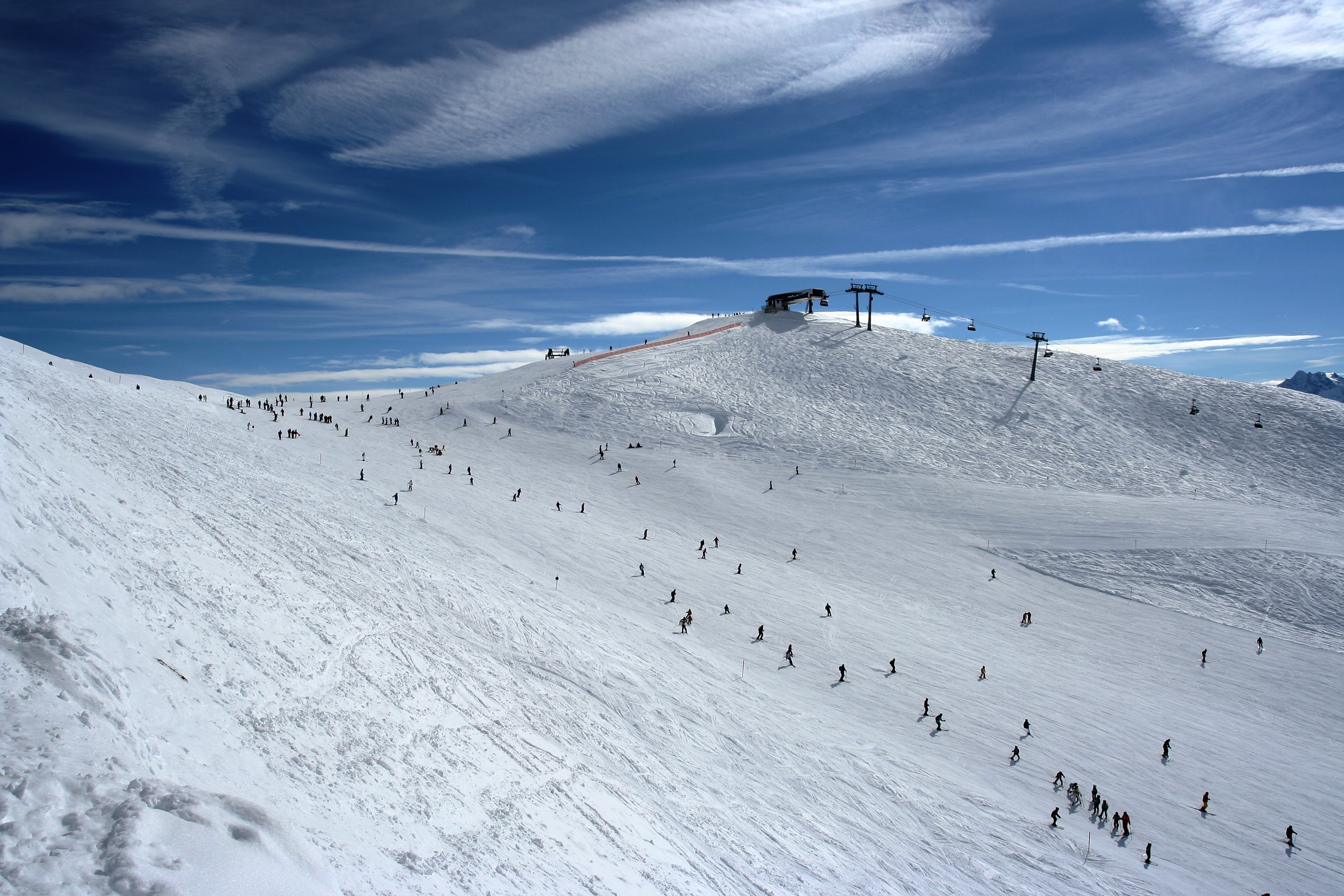
Alpine ski slope in the Zillertal valley, Austria

== Territory ==
The territory includes 83 NUTS 3-level local administrative divisions and about 6,200 municipalities.

In a narrow sense, the term "Alpine states" could be applied to Austria (28.7% of the total area), Italy (27.2%), and France (21.4%), which represent more than 77% of the Alpine territory and more than three quarters of the Alpine population. However, for larger countries like Italy and France, the share of their territory within the Alpine region only amounts to 17% and 7%, respectively. From a strictly national point of view, and with the exception of microstates Liechtenstein and Monaco, the Alps are dominant in only two countries: Austria (65.5% of its territory) and Switzerland (65%).

== Diplomacy ==
The diplomatic status between these countries varies depending on their individual relationships with each other. Many of these countries are members of the European Union (EU) and have close diplomatic ties with each other through this regional organization. The EU has helped to facilitate greater cooperation and integration among the Alpine states in various areas, such as trade, transportation, and environmental policy.

There are also several bilateral agreements and treaties between these countries, covering issues such as border security, trade, and cultural exchange. In addition, these countries work together through various regional and international organizations, including the United Nations and the World Trade Organization.

== See also ==
- Alpine skiing
- Association of the Alpine States
