= 2019 Liechtenstein local elections =

- 24 March 2019 (first round); 14 April 2019 (second round)

The 2019 Liechtenstein local elections were held on 24 March and 14 April to elect the municipal councils and the mayors of the eleven municipalities of Liechtenstein.

== Electoral system ==
The municipal councils (German: Gemeinderat) are composed of an even number of councillors plus the mayor (German: Gemeindevorsteher). The number of councillors is determined by population count: 6 or 8 councillors for population 1,500, 8 or 10 councillors for population between 1,500 and 3,000, and 10 or 12 councillors for population over 3,000.

Councillors were elected in single multi-member districts, consisting of the municipality's territory, using an open list proportional representation system. Voting was on the basis of universal suffrage in a secret ballot. The mayors were elected in a two-round system. As three of the municipalities saw none of the candidates achieving a majority in the first round, a second round was held four weeks later, where the candidate with a plurality were elected as a mayor.

== Mayoral elections results ==
=== Summary ===
Party	First round			Second round			Total Mayors	+/–
Party	Votes	%	Mayors	Votes	%	Mayors	Total Mayors	+/–
Progressive Citizens' Party	6,249	47.4	5	2,837	52.1	2	7	+1
Patriotic Union	5,654	42.9	3	1,902	34.9	1	4	–1
Democrats for Liechtenstein	719	5.5	0	625	11.5	0	0	0
Free List	459	3.5	0	–	–	–	0	0
Independent	91	0.7	0	81	1.5	0	0	0
Invalid/blank votes	1,870	–	–	252	–	–	–	–
Total	15,042	100	8	5,697	100	3	11	–
Registered voters/turnout	17,880	79.6	–	7,649	74.5	–	–	–
Source: Gemeindewahlen, Statistisches Jahrbuch 2020

=== By municipality ===
==== First round ====
Municipality	Electorate	Party	Candidate	Votes	%
Balzers	2,613	Progressive Citizens' Party	Hansjörg Büchel	1,216	61.7
Balzers	2,613	Patriotic Union	Günter Vogt	755	38.3
Eschen	2,275	Progressive Citizens' Party	Tino Quaderer	700	40.1
Eschen	2,275	Democrats for Liechtenstein	Leo Kranz	402	25.2
Eschen	2,275	Patriotic Union	Viktor Meier	395	24.8
Eschen	2,275	Free List	Harry Hasler-Maier	146	9.2
Gamprin	871	Progressive Citizens' Party	Johannes Hasler	544	82.4
Mauren	2,101	Progressive Citizens' Party	Freddy Kaiser	1,091	72.2
Planken	268	Patriotic Union	Rainer Beck	118	50.9
Planken	268	Progressive Citizens' Party	Gaston Jehle	114	49.1
Ruggell	1,258	Progressive Citizens' Party	Maria Kaiser-Eberle	775	80.6
Schaan	3,055	Patriotic Union	Daniel Hilti	1,840	84.4
Schellenberg	633	Progressive Citizens' Party	Norman Wohlwend	402	78.2
Triesen	2,620	Patriotic Union	Daniela Wellenzohn-Erne	779	43.2
Triesen	2,620	Progressive Citizens' Party	Remy Kindle	708	39.2
Triesen	2,620	Democrats for Liechtenstein	Thomas Rehak	317	17.6
Triesenberg	1,712	Patriotic Union	Christoph Beck	1,028	75.5
Vaduz	2,754	Progressive Citizens' Party	Manfred Bischof	748	39.6
Vaduz	2,754	Patriotic Union	Frank Konrad	739	39.1
Vaduz	2,754	Free List	René Hasler	313	16.6
Vaduz	2,754	Independent	Giovanna Gould	91	4.8
Source: Gemeindewahlen, Statistisches Jahrbuch 2020

==== Second round ====
Municipality	Electorate	Party	Candidate	Votes	%
Eschen	2,275	Progressive Citizens' Party	Tino Quaderer	958	60.5
Eschen	2,275	Democrats for Liechtenstein	Leo Kranz	625	39.5
Triesen	1,712	Patriotic Union	Daniela Wellenzohn-Erne	1,010	53.4
Triesen	1,712	Progressive Citizens' Party	Remy Kindle	883	46.6
Vaduz	2,754	Progressive Citizens' Party	Manfred Bischof	996	50.6
Vaduz	2,754	Patriotic Union	Frank Konrad	892	45.3
Vaduz	2,754	Independent	Giovanna Gould	81	4.1
Source: Gemeindewahlen, Statistisches Jahrbuch 2020

== Municipal council elections results ==
=== Summary ===
Party	Votes	%	Seats	+/–
Progressive Citizens' Party	62,547	42.9	55	–3
Patriotic Union	60,739	41.6	50	-1
Free List	14,024	10.4	8	+5
The Independents	3,652	2.9	1	–2
Democrats for Liechtenstein	3,119	2.1	1	New
Total	144,081	100	115	–
Valid ballots	14,135	95.17		
Invalid/blank ballots	717	4.83		
Total	14,852	100		
Registered voters/turnout	20,160	73.67		
Source: Gemeindewahlen, Statistisches Jahrbuch 2020

=== Results by municipality ===
Municipality	Seats	Electorate	Party	Candidates	Votes	%	Seats
Balzers	12	2,613	Patriotic Union	Désirée Bürzle; Martin Büchel; Thomas Wolfinger; Norbert Foser; Bettina Fuchs; Corinne Indermaur-Wille; Karl Malin; Monika Oehri-Vogt	9,057	46.3	5
Balzers	12	2,613	Progressive Citizens' Party	Karl Frick; Christoph Frick; Matthias Eberle; Lukas Frick; Carmen Büchel; Nils Vollmar	8,083	41.3	4
Balzers	12	2,613	Free List	Bettina Eberle-Frommelt	2,440	12.5	1
Eschen	10	2,275	Patriotic Union	Gebhard Senti; Alexandra Meier-Hasler; Mario Hundertpfund; Diana Ritter; Kevin Beck; Anton Wohlwend; Simone Schäpper-Gstöhl; Christoph Kranz	5,726	35.9	5
Eschen	10	2,275	Progressive Citizens' Party	Karin Zech-Hoop; Fredy Allgäuer; Sylvia Pedrazzini-Maxfield; Gerhard Gerner; Tanja Plüss; Sona Zauner; Daniel Marxer; Johannes Krässig	6,593	41.4	4
Eschen	10	2,275	Democrats for Liechtenstein	Simon Schächle; Werner Dolzer	1,836	11.5	1
Eschen	10	2,275	Free List	Harry Hasler-Maier	1,201	7.5	0
Eschen	10	2,275	The Independents	Peter Laukas; Werner Frommelt	584	3.7	0
Gamprin	8	871	Progressive Citizens' Party	Michael Näscher; Thomas Hasler; Dagmar Gadow; Alfred Hasler; Simone Sulser-Hasler; Peter Marxer	2,871	56.7	4
Gamprin	8	871	Patriotic Union	Barbara Kind; Nora Meier; Andreas Oehri; Christian Marxer	2,193	43.3	4
Mauren	10	2,101	Progressive Citizens' Party	Dominik Amman; Christoph Marxer; Martin Beck; Annalis Marte; Martin Lampert; Antje Matt-Marxer; Livia Senti; Mario Meier	7,652	54.5	5
Mauren	10	2,101	Patriotic Union	Patrik Schreiber; Marcel Öhri; Mirjam Posch; Martina Brändle-Nipp; Marcel Senti; Sandro Kaiser	4,778	34.0	4
Mauren	10	2,101	Free List	Andrea Matt	1,610	11.5	1
Planken	6	268	Progressive Citizens' Party	Bettina Petzold-Mähr; Barbara Laukas; Urs Kranz; Alexander Ritter	723	50.2	4
Planken	6	268	Patriotic Union	Elke Kaiser-Gantner; Norbert Gantner Jr.	522	36.3	1
Planken	6	268	Free List	Katja Langenbahn-Schremser	195	13.5	1
Ruggell	8	1,258	Progressive Citizens' Party	Heinz Biedermann; Sibylle Walt; Melanie Egloff-Büchel; Alois Hoop; Nicole Öhri-Elkuch; Christian Büchel	4,230	57.8	4
Ruggell	8	1,258	Patriotic Union	Jürgen Hasler; Cornelia Hanselmann; Benedikt Oehry; Kevin Hasler; Markus Mathis	3,090	42.2	4
Schaan	12	3,055	Patriotic Union	Simon Biedermann; Rudolf Wachter; Caroline Riegler-Rüdisser; Martin Hilti; Gabriela Hilti-Saleem; Magdalena Frommelt; Frederic Frick; Michael Winkler; Ingolf Feger	9,965	40.4	5
Schaan	12	3,055	Progressive Citizens' Party	Alexandra Konrad-Biedermann; Markus Falk; Nikolaus Beck; Melanie Vonbun-Frommelt; Anton Ospelt; Hubert Marxer; Petra Schifferle-Walser; Hans-Jörg Kaufmann	9,389	38.1	5
Schaan	12	3,055	Free List	Andreas Heeb; Alexander Hilzinger; Ute Jastrzab	3,246	13.2	1
Schaan	12	3,055	The Independents	Jakob Quaderer	2,072	8.4	1
Schellenberg	8	633	Progressive Citizens' Party	Elke Desliens; Stephan Marxer; Marco Willi-Wohlwend; Andrea Kaiser-Kreuzer; Jürgen Goop; Esther Ladner	1,899	49.1	4
Schellenberg	8	633	Patriotic Union	Harald Lampert; Christian Meier; Birgit Beck; Arinette De Carlo; Peter Büchel	1,515	39.2	3
Schellenberg	8	633	Free List	Patrick Risch	450	11.6	1
Triesen	10	2,620	Patriotic Union	Eva Johann-Heidegger; Fabian Wolfinger; Max Burgmeier; Rony Bargetze; Matthias Biedermann; Piero Sprenger; Sabrina Feger	8,065	44.8	5
Triesen	10	2,620	Progressive Citizens' Party	Egbert Sprenger; Dominik Banzer; Paul Kindle; Nicole Schurte; Nicole Felix; Heimo Ackermann; Martin Corradini	6,460	35.9	5
Triesen	10	2,620	Democrats for Liechtenstein	Klaus-Dieter Kindle; Markus Sprenger; Raphael Banzer	1,283	7.1	0
Triesen	10	2,620	Free List	Joachim Batliner-Joliat; Jafar Haji Abbassi	1,270	7.1	0
Triesen	10	2,620	The Independents	Ivo Kaufmann	922	5.1	0
Triesenberg	10	1,712	Patriotic Union	Thomas Lampert; Thomas Nigg; Barbara Welte-Beck; Michael Gätzi; Alexandra Roth-Schädler; Marlies Haas; Matthias Beck; Christoph Eberle	6,795	52.1	5
Triesenberg	10	1,712	Progressive Citizens' Party	Reto Eberle; Gertrud Vogt; Armin Schädler; Stephan Gassner; Marco Strub; Fabio Gassner; Jonny Sele; Adrian Gertsch	5,126	39.3	4
Triesenberg	10	1,712	Free List	Corina Vogt-Beck; Sebastian Meier	1,129	8.7	1
Vaduz	12	2,754	Progressive Citizens' Party	Toni Real; Philip Thöny; Priska Risch-Amann; Hannelore Eller-Hemmerle; Ruth Ospelt-Niepelt; Georg Ospelt; Benjamin Fischer; Willy Vogt; Nicole Wäger	9,521	41.6	5
Vaduz	12	2,754	Patriotic Union	Petra Miescher; Antje Moser; Natascha Söldi; Daniela Ospelt; Josef Feurle; Rainer Tschütscher; Philippe Hefti; Patrick Wille; Maylin Roth-Wachter; Martin Gassner; Philip Schädler; Volker Frommelt	9,033	39.5	5
Vaduz	12	2,754	Free List	Stefanie Hasler; Stephan Gstöhl; Rahel Rauter; Manuel Kieber	3,684	16.1	2
Vaduz	12	2,754	The Independents	Bianca Risch	658	2.9	0
