= 2023 Liechtenstein local elections =

- 5 March 2023 (first round); 2 April 2023 (second round)

The 2023 Liechtenstein local elections were held on 5 March and 2 April to elect the municipal councils and the mayors of the eleven municipalities of Liechtenstein.

== Electoral system ==
The municipal councils (German: Gemeinderat) are composed of an even number of councillors plus the mayor (German: Gemeindevorsteher). The number of councillors is determined by population count: 6 or 8 councillors for population 1,500, 8 or 10 councillors for population between 1,500 and 3,000, and 10 or 12 councillors for population over 3,000.

Councillors were elected in single multi-member districts, consisting of the municipality's territory, using an open list proportional representation system. Voting was on the basis of universal suffrage in a secret ballot. The mayors were elected in a two-round system. As two of the municipalities saw none of the candidates achieving a majority in the first round, a second round was held four weeks later, where the candidates with a plurality were elected as mayors.

== Overall results ==
=== Old and new mayors in the municipalities ===
Mayors Outgoing and Incoming
Municipality	Electoral District	Incumbent mayor (2019 election)^{a.}	Elected mayor^{b.}
Eschen	Unterland	Tino Quaderer	Tino Quaderer^{NC}
Gamprin	Unterland	Johannes Hasler	Johannes Hasler^{NC}
Mauren	Unterland	Freddy Kaiser^{DNRA}	Peter Frick
Ruggell	Unterland	Maria Kaiser-Eberle^{DNRA}	Christian Öhri
Schellenberg	Unterland	Norman Wohlwend^{DNRA}	Dietmar Lampert^{SR}
Balzers	Oberland	Hansjörg Büchel^{DNRA}	Karl Malin
Planken	Oberland	Rainer Beck	Rainer Beck
Schaan	Oberland	Daniel Hilti	Daniel Hilti^{NC}
Triesen	Oberland	Daniela Erne	Daniela Erne^{SR}
Triesenberg	Oberland	Christoph Beck	Christoph Beck
Vaduz	Oberland	Manfred Bischof	Petra Miescher
a. Source: Gemeindewahlen2019
b. Source: Gemeindewahlen2023

NC = No Contest (no other candidate running for mayor)
DNRA = Did not run again for mayoral position
SR = Won in the second round of the mayoral election on 02 April 2023.

=== Results by council ===
Council	Electoral District	FBP		VU		FL		DpL		Total	Control
Eschen	Unterland	5*	Steady	4	▼1	0	Steady	2	▲1	11	FBP plurality
Gamprin	Unterland	5*	Steady	4	Steady	0	Steady	0	Steady	9	FBP majority
Mauren	Unterland	6	Steady	4*	Steady	0	▼1	1	▲1	11	FBP majority
Ruggell	Unterland	5*	Steady	4	Steady	0	Steady	0	Steady	9	FBP majority
Schellenberg	Unterland	4	▼1	4*	▲1	1	Steady	0	Steady	9	"Hung" Council
Balzers	Oberland	4	▼1	6*	▲1	1	Steady	0	Steady	11	VU majority
Planken	Oberland	4	Steady	3*	▲1	0	▼1	0	Steady	7	FBP majority
Schaan	Oberland	6	▲1	6*	Steady	1	Steady	0	Steady	13	"Hung" Council
Triesen	Oberland	4	▼1	5*	▼1	1	▲1	1	▲1	11	VU plurality
Triesenberg	Oberland	5	▲1	6*	Steady	0	▼1	0	Steady	11	VU majority
Vaduz	Oberland	6	Steady	5*	Steady	1	▼1	1	▲1	13	FBP plurality
Total		54	▼1	51	▲1	5	▼3	5	▲4	115	Steady
Source: Gemeindewahlen2023

*This includes the mayor, who serves as a member of their respective councils, but are voted for in a separate election.

== Mayoral elections results ==
2023 Liechtenstein mayoral elections
- 5 March 2023 (first round); 2 April 2023 (second round)

11 mayors
- Turnout: 73.9% (first round); 76.2% (second round)
	First party	Second party
Party	VU	FBP
Seats before	4	7
Seats won	8	3
Seat change	▲4	▼4
Percentage	51.5% 50.0%	45.9% 48.2%
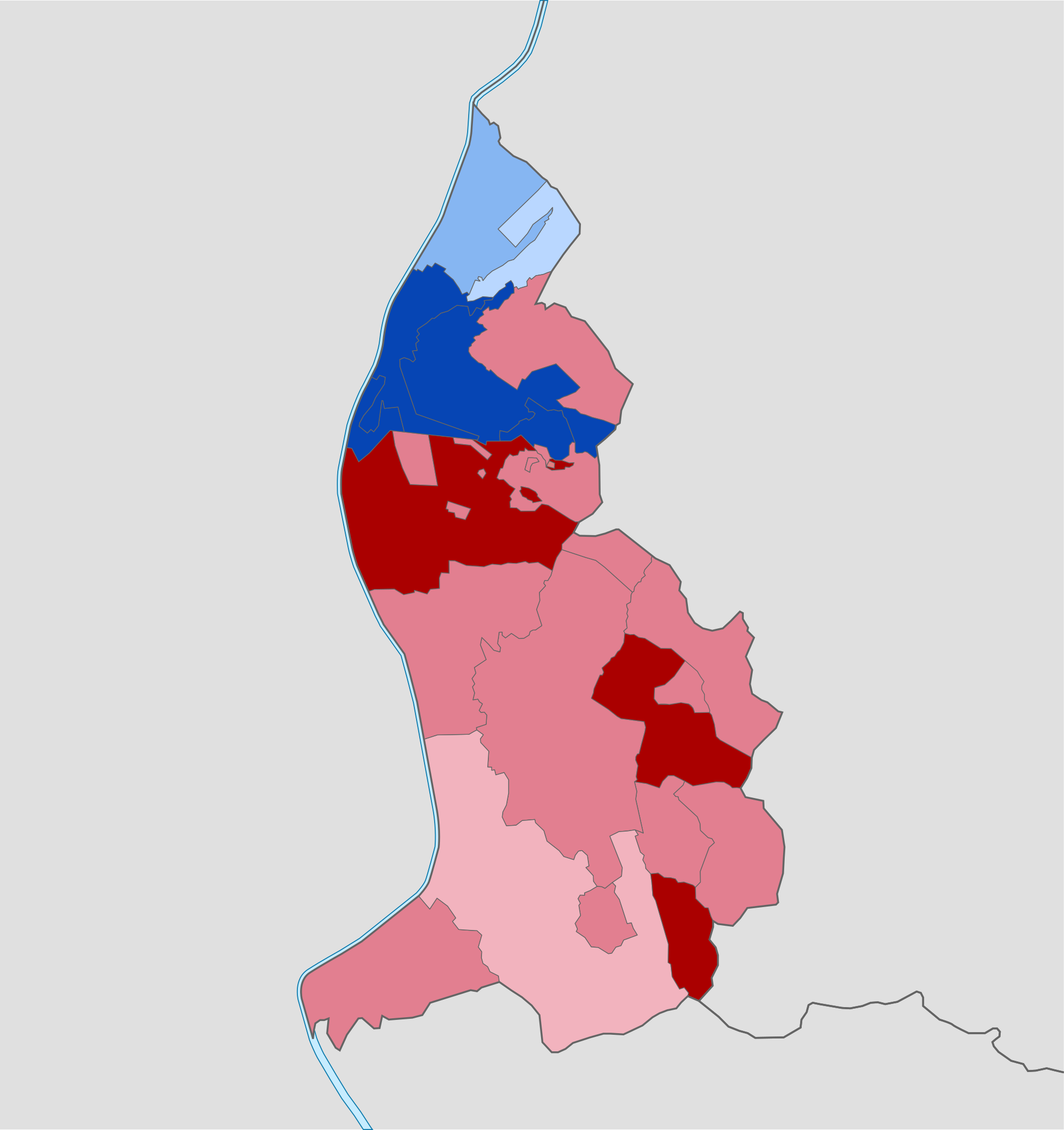

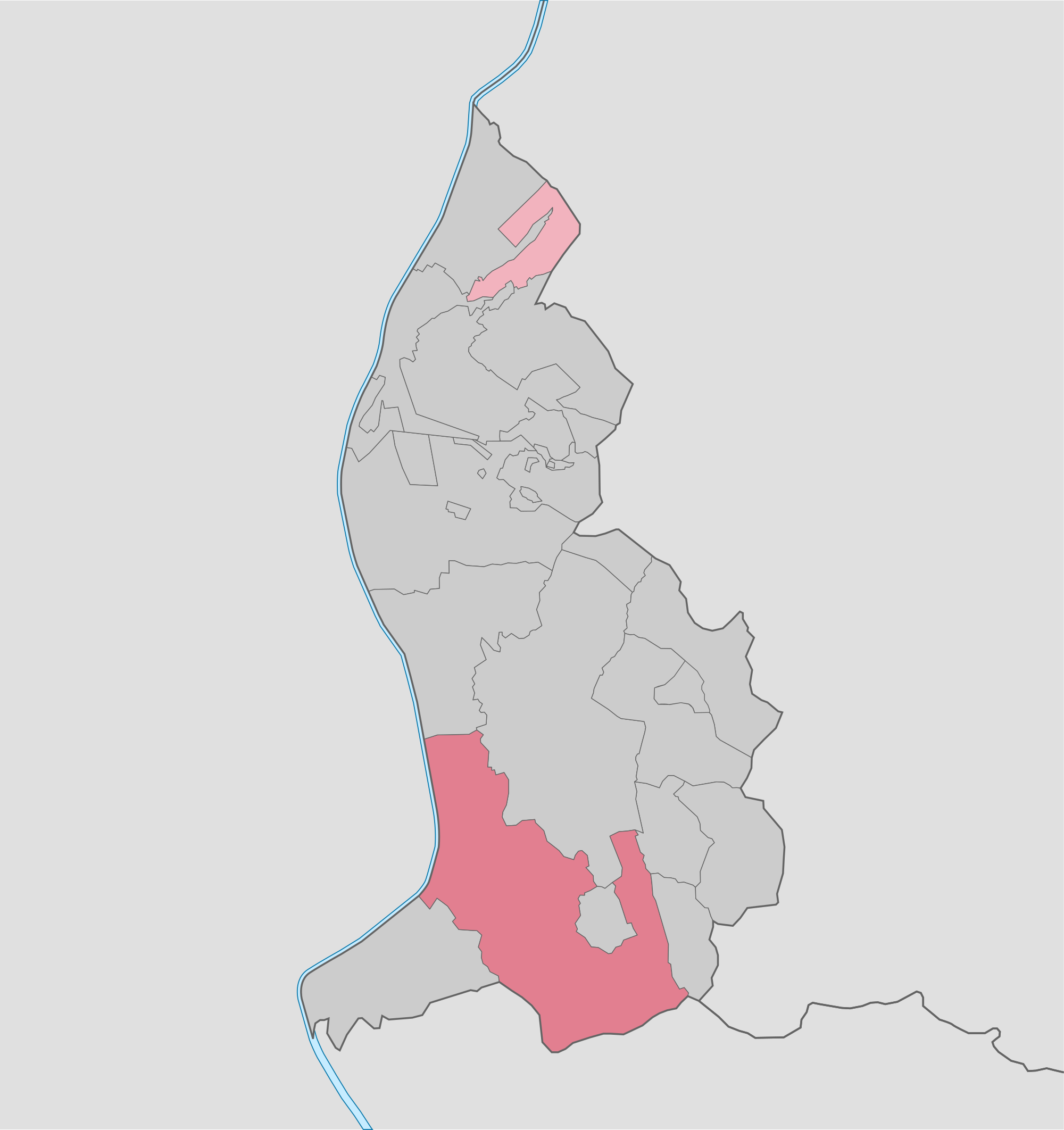
FBP
40–50%
50–60%
60–70%
70–80%
80–90%
90–100%
VU
40–50%
50–60%
60–70%
70–80%
80–90%
90–100%

=== Summary ===
Party	First round			Second round			Total Mayors	+/−
Party	Votes	%	Mayors	Votes	%	Mayors	Total Mayors	+/−
Patriotic Union	7,330	51.51	6	1,238	49.96	2	8	+4
Progressive Citizens' Party	6,536	45.93	3	1,195	48.22	0	3	−4
Young List	267	1.88	0	–	–	–	0	New
Free List	97	0.68	0	45	1.82	0	0	0
Valid votes	14,230	93.25	–	2,478	96.42	–	–	–
Invalid/blank votes	1,330	6.75	–	92	3.58	–	–	–
Total	15,260	100	9	2,570	100	2	11	–
Registered voters/turnout	20,730	73.61	–	3,372	76.22	–	–	–
Source: Gemeindewahlen

=== By municipality ===
==== First round ====
Municipality	Electorate	Party	Candidate	Votes	%
Balzers	2,643	Patriotic Union	Karl Malin	1,127	59.8
Balzers	2,643	Progressive Citizens' Party	Marcel Kaufmann	601	31.9
Balzers	2,643	Young List	Samuel Schurte	157	8.3
Eschen	2,342	Progressive Citizens' Party	Tino Quaderer	1291	80.7
Gamprin	913	Progressive Citizens' Party	Johannes Hasler	534	84.1
Mauren	2,186	Patriotic Union	Peter Frick	897	57.3
Mauren	2,186	Progressive Citizens' Party	Dominik Amman	668	42.7
Planken	264	Patriotic Union	Rainer Beck	131	58.2
Planken	264	Progressive Citizens' Party	Bettina Petzold-Mähr	94	41.8
Ruggell	1,360	Progressive Citizens' Party	Christian Öhri	583	54.6
Ruggell	1,360	Patriotic Union	Mario Wohlwend	484	45.4
Schaan	3,130	Patriotic Union	Daniel Hilti	1,733	82.3
Schellenberg	648	Progressive Citizens' Party	Robert Hassler	221	41.8
Schellenberg	648	Patriotic Union	Dietmar Lampert	211	39.9
Schellenberg	648	Free List	Patrick Risch	97	18.3
Triesen	2,726	Patriotic Union	Daniela Erne	886	48.0
Triesen	2,726	Progressive Citizens' Party	Egbert Sprenger	848	46.0
Triesen	2,726	Young List	Daniel Lochner	110	6.0
Triesenberg	1,683	Patriotic Union	Christoph Beck	808	59.7
Triesenberg	1,683	Progressive Citizens' Party	Mario Bühler	546	40.3
Vaduz	2,835	Patriotic Union	Petra Miescher	1053	55.3
Vaduz	2,835	Progressive Citizens' Party	Manfred Bischof	850	44.7
Source: Gemeindewahlen

==== Second round ====
Municipality	Electorate	Party	Candidate	Votes	%
Schellenberg	648	Patriotic Union	Dietmar Lampert	254	46.4
Schellenberg	648	Progressive Citizens' Party	Robert Hassler	249	45.4
Schellenberg	648	Free List	Patrick Risch	45	8.2
Triesen	2,724	Patriotic Union	Daniela Erne	984	51.0
Triesen	2,724	Progressive Citizens' Party	Egbert Sprenger	946	49.0
Source: Gemeindewahlen

== Municipal council elections results ==
2023 Liechtenstein municipal elections
- 5 March 2023

115 municipal councilors
- Turnout: 73.6%
	First party	Second party	Third party
Party	FBP	VU	FL
Seats before	55	50	8
Seats won	54	51	5
Seat change	▼1	▲1	▼3
Percentage	41.5%	44.9%	7.5%
	Fourth party
Party	DpL
Seats before	1
Seats won	5
Seat change	▲4
Percentage	6.1%
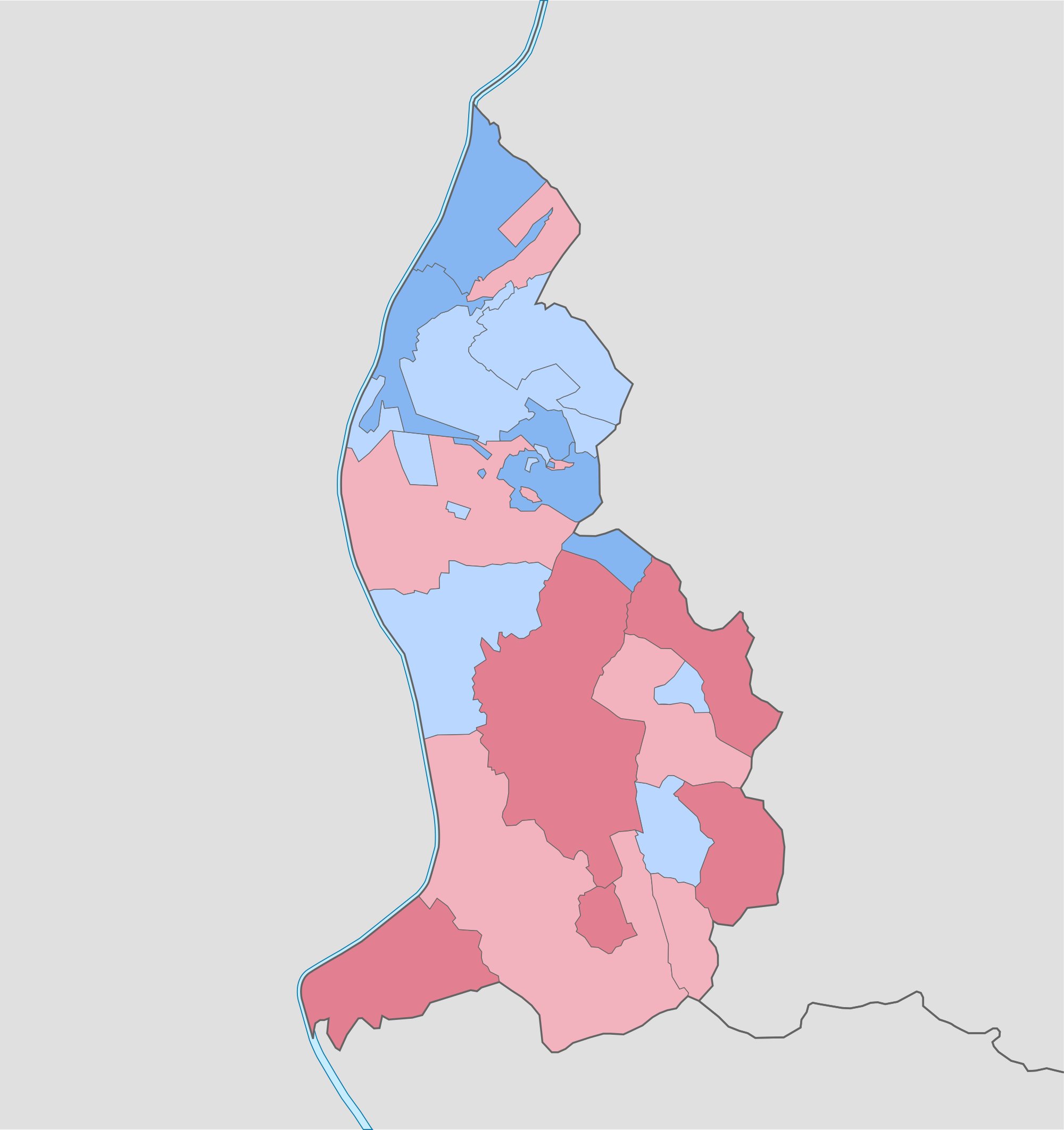
FBP
40–50%
50–60%
VU
40–50%
50–60%

=== Summary ===
1
Party	Votes	%	Seats	+/–
Patriotic Union	65,766	44.90	51	
Progressive Citizens' Party	60,772	41.49	54	−1
Free List	10,954	7.48	5	−3
Democrats for Liechtenstein	8,980	6.13	5	+4
Total	146,472	100	115	–
Valid ballots	14,393	94.32		
Invalid/blank ballots	867	5.68		
Total	15,260	100		
Registered voters/turnout	20,730	73.61		
Source: Gemeindewahlen

=== Results by municipality ===
Municipality	Seats	Electorate	Party	Candidates	Votes	%	Seats
Balzers	10	2,643	Patriotic Union	Arno Sprenger; Désirée Bürzle; Petra Chesi-Schelbert; Richard Vogt; Norbert Foser; Thomas Wolfinger; Michèle Raich-Frick	10,408	55.1	5
Balzers	10	2,643	Progressive Citizens' Party	Matthias Eberle; Markus Tschugmell; Karl Frick; Christoph Frick; Isabelle Wiebach; Lukas Frick; Daniel Brunhart; Ajla Delalic	6,593	34.9	4
Balzers	10	2,643	Free List	Julia Strauss	1,899	10.0	1
Eschen	10	2,342	Progressive Citizens' Party	Fredy Allgäuer; Günter Meier; Sybille Oehry; Gerhard Gerner; Ulrike Charles; Fabienne Mascetti; Manfred Beck	6,502	42.7	4
Eschen	10	2,342	Patriotic Union	Gebhard Senti; Matthias Oberparleiter; Alexandra Meier-Hasler; Matthias Ender; Selma Langthaler; Daniela Reich; Stephan Buob; Angelika Gassner	5,896	38.7	4
Eschen	10	2,342	Democrats for Liechtenstein	Simon Schächle; Katrin Marxer	2,822	18.5	2
Gamprin	8	913	Progressive Citizens' Party	Michaela Maria Näscher; Helmut Hasler; Michael Näscher; Jasmin Kobler; Geraldine Kissling	2,676	55.5	4
Gamprin	8	913	Patriotic Union	Barbara Kind; Martin Oehri; Andreas Oehri; Christian Näff; Alexandra Legéndi	2,148	44.5	4
Mauren	10	2,186	Progressive Citizens' Party	Philipp Kieber; Dominik Matt; Martin Beck; Lorin Oehri-Hoop; David Walser; Sonja Hersche; Sara Marxer-Pino; Martin Breuss	7,143	46.4	6
Mauren	10	2,186	Patriotic Union	Marcel Öhri; Mirjam Gantner-Posch; Yannick Ritter; Corrine Thöny-Gritsch; Mario Marxer; Patrick Potetz	5,845	37.9	3
Mauren	10	2,186	Democrats for Liechtenstein	Eric Gstöhl	1,249	8.1	1
Mauren	10	2,186	Free List	Andrea Matt; Michael Weninger	1,173	7.6	0
Planken	6	264	Progressive Citizens' Party	Stefan Miescher; Adrian Nüesch; Barbara Nigg; Alexander Ritter	745	56.7	4
Planken	6	264	Patriotic Union	Hubert Eberle; Elke Kaiser-Gantner	569	43.3	2
Ruggell	8	1,360	Progressive Citizens' Party	Heinz Biedermann; Christian Büchel; Carmen Reutegger; Fabian Haltinner; Katharina Marxer; Tamara Geistor	4,284	51.6	4
Ruggell	8	1,360	Patriotic Union	Reto Bischof; Patricia Oehri-Eggenberger; Benedikt Oehry; Jürgen Hasler; Shane Hasler; Cornelia Hanselmann	4,012	48.4	4
Schaan	12	3,130	Patriotic Union	Martin Hilti; Marcel Jehle; Gabriela Hilti-Saleem; Jeannine Preite-Niedhart; Marlen Jehle; Caroline Riegler (-Rüdisser); Can Karakoc; Michael Winkler	10,244	43.6	5
Schaan	12	3,130	Progressive Citizens' Party	Laura Frick; Markus Beck; Alexandra Konrad-Biedermann; Anton Ospelt; Melanie Vonbun-Frommelt; Hubert Marxer; Brigitta Wenaweser Egli; Jean-Pierre Sorichilli	10,057	42.8	6
Schaan	12	3,130	Free List	Loris Vogt	3,183	13.6	1
Schellenberg	8	648	Patriotic Union	Christoph Oehri; Christian Meier; Harald Lampert; Birgit Beck; Daniel Brendle	1,988	47.2	3
Schellenberg	8	648	Progressive Citizens' Party	Jonas Grubenmann; Karin Manhart; Esther Kieber; Ewald Kieber; Carolin Schnur; Marc Reschützer	1,733	41.1	4
Schellenberg	8	648	Free List	Eva-Maria Nicolussi Vogt	495	11.7	1
Triesen	10	2,726	Patriotic Union	Fabian Wolfinger; Armin Heidegger; Rony Bargetze; Max Burgmeier; Mario Strohschänk; Seraina Ackermann-Forstinger	7,885	42.5	4
Triesen	10	2,726	Progressive Citizens' Party	Dominik Banzer; Nicole Schurte; Nicole Felix; Kurt Salzgeber; Christian F. Anrig; Nicola Kindle; Christian Blank; Stefan Tschiggfrei	6,277	33.9	4
Triesen	10	2,726	Democrats for Liechtenstein	Pascal Odinga	2,623	14.2	1
Triesen	10	2,726	Free List	Andrea Hoch	1,745	9.4	1
Triesenberg	10	1,683	Patriotic Union	Thomas Lampert; Michael Gätzi; Mirco Beck; Barbara Welte-Beck; Alexandra Roth-Schädler; Birgit Beck-Blum; Jürgen Beck; Christine Lohner	7,271	54.9	5
Triesenberg	10	1,683	Progressive Citizens' Party	Normann Bühler; Reto Eberle; Sonja Gschwend; Manuel Beck; Josef Schädler; German Beck; Birgit Seger	5,240	39.5	5
Triesenberg	10	1,683	Free List	Mario Senn	739	5.6	0
Vaduz	12	2,835	Progressive Citizens' Party	Florian Meier; Priska Risch-Amann; André Rumpold; Ruth Ospelt-Niepelt; Philip Thöny; Christine Tinner-Rampone; Yvonne Ospelt; Urs Kobald	9,522	41.3	6
Vaduz	12	2,835	Patriotic Union	Petra Miescher; Antje Moser; Natascha Söldi; Daniela Ospelt; Josef Feurle; Claudia Bartholdi; Isabella Heeb; Andreas Eberle; Thomas Keller	9,500	41.3	4
Vaduz	12	2,835	Democrats for Liechtenstein	Pascal Büttiker	2,286	9.9	1
Vaduz	12	2,835	Free List	Jakob Becker	1,720	7.5	1
Source: Gemeindewahlen
