= 2015 Vaduz elections =

- 15 March 2015
- Mayoral election
- Turnout: 76.91%
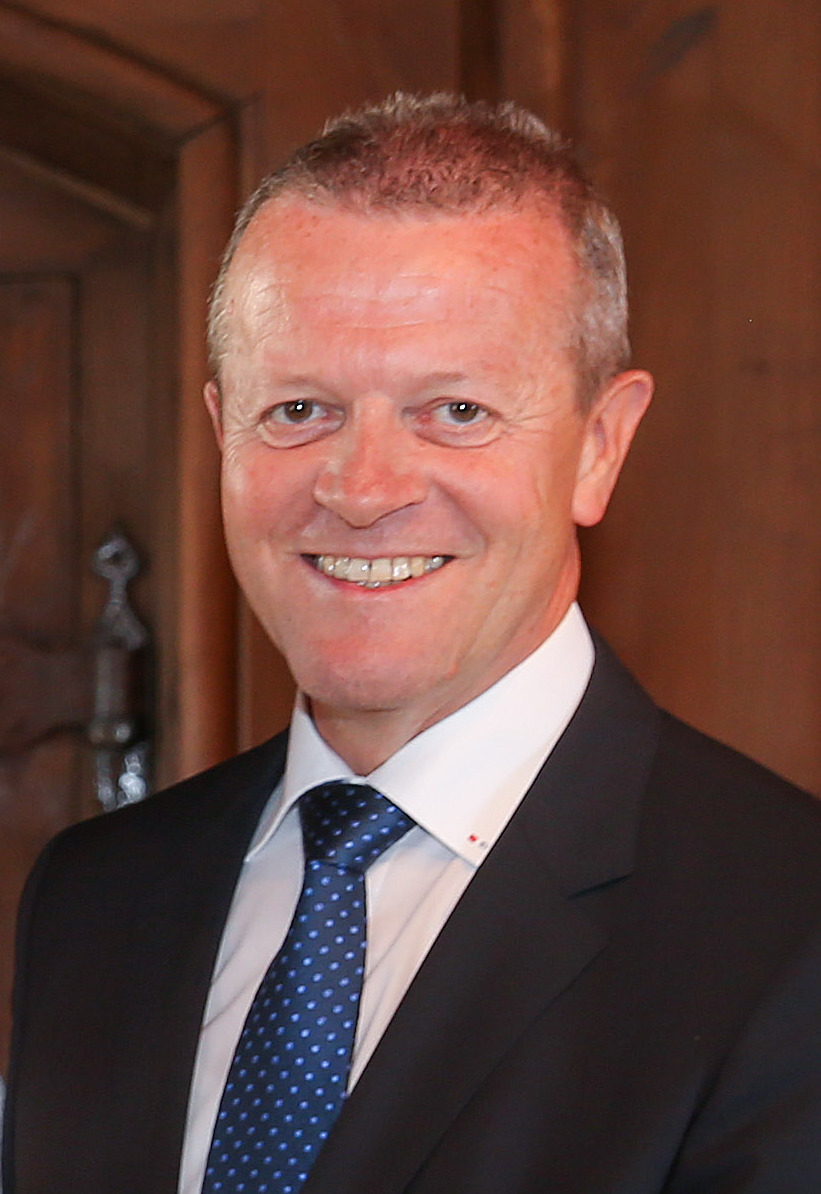
Candidate	Ewald Ospelt	Clemens Laternser
Party	FBP	VU
Popular vote	1130	730
Percentage	60.75%	39.25%
Mayor before election
Ewald Ospelt
FBP
Elected mayor
Ewald Ospelt
FBP
- Municipal Council election
- All 12 seats in the municipal council 7 seats needed for a majority
Party	Vote %	Seats	+/–
Progressive Citizens' Party	49.73	7	+1
Patriotic Union	36.91	5	0
This lists parties that won seats. See the complete results below.

Elections were held in Vaduz on 15 March 2015 to elect the mayor of Vaduz and the Vaduz municipal council. Incumbent mayor Ewald Ospelt of the Progressive Citizens' Party sought re-election for a third term and defeated challenger Clemens Laternser of the Patriotic Union. The FBP gained the majority of the seats in the municipal council, winning seven, whereas the VU won five.

== Background ==
Incumbent mayor Ewald Ospelt was nominated for a third term as mayor, and the FBP presented its candidates for the municipal council on 23 October 2014. The VU nominated Clemens Laternser for mayor and presented its candidates for the municipal council on 22 November.

During a mayoral debate on 19 February 2015, Laternser accused Ospelt of nepotism, which he denied.

== Electoral system ==
The 12-person municipal council is elected by open list proportional representation. Voters vote for a party list and then may strike through candidates they do not wish to cast a preferential vote for and may add names of candidates from other lists.

The mayor is elected by a majority vote. If none of the candidates achieve a majority in the first round, a second round would be held four weeks later, where the candidate with a plurality would be elected as a mayor.

== Results ==
=== Mayoral election ===
Candidate	Party	Votes	%
Ewald Ospelt	Progressive Citizens' Party	1,130	60.75
Clemens Laternser	Patriotic Union	730	39.25
Total		1,860	100.00
Valid votes		1,860	92.63
Invalid votes		44	2.19
Blank votes		104	5.18
Total votes		2,008	100.00
Registered voters/turnout		2,611	76.91
Source: Gemeindewahlen

=== Municipal council election ===
Party	Votes	%	Seats	+/–
Progressive Citizens' Party	11,045	49.73	7	+1
Patriotic Union	8,199	36.91	5	0
The Independents	1,497	6.74	0	New
Free List	1,471	6.62	0	–1
Total	22,212	100.00	12	0
Valid votes	2,008	92.75		
Invalid votes	98	4.53		
Blank votes	59	2.73		
Total votes	2,165	100.00		
Registered voters/turnout	2,611	82.92		
Source: Gemeindewahlen

Seats	Electorate	Party	Candidates	Votes	%	Seats
12	2,611	Progressive Citizens' Party	Toni Real; Philip Thöny; Manfred Ospelt; Manfred Bischof; Hannelore Eller-Hemmerle; Priska Risch-Amann; Thomas Vogt; Tamara Ospelt; Lins Florin; Martin Konrad	11,045	49.7	7
12	2,611	Patriotic Union	Frank Konrad; Patrick Wille; Josef Feurle; Philip Schädler; Antje Moser; Martin Gassner; Hanny Büchel; Alexandra Schädler; Volker Frommelt	8,199	36.9	5
12	2,611	The Independents	Michael Gassner	1,497	6.7	0
12	2,611	Free List	Hannes Schatzmann-Krättli; Richard Brunhart	1,471	6.6	0
Source: Gemeindewahlen
