= 2015 Liechtenstein local elections =

- 15 March 2015

The 2015 Liechtenstein local elections were held on 15 March to elect the municipal councils and the mayors of the eleven municipalities of Liechtenstein.

== Electoral system ==
The municipal councils (German: Gemeinderat) are composed of an even number of councillors plus the mayor (German: Gemeindevorsteher). The number of councillors is determined by population count: 6 or 8 councillors for population 1,500, 8 or 10 councillors for population between 1,500 and 3,000, and 10 or 12 councillors for population over 3,000.

Councillors were elected in single multi-member districts, consisting of the municipality's territory, using an open list proportional representation system. Voting was on the basis of universal suffrage in a secret ballot. The mayors were elected in a two-round system. If none of the candidates achieved a majority in the first round, a second round would have been held four weeks later, where the candidate with a plurality would be elected as a mayor.

== Mayoral elections results ==
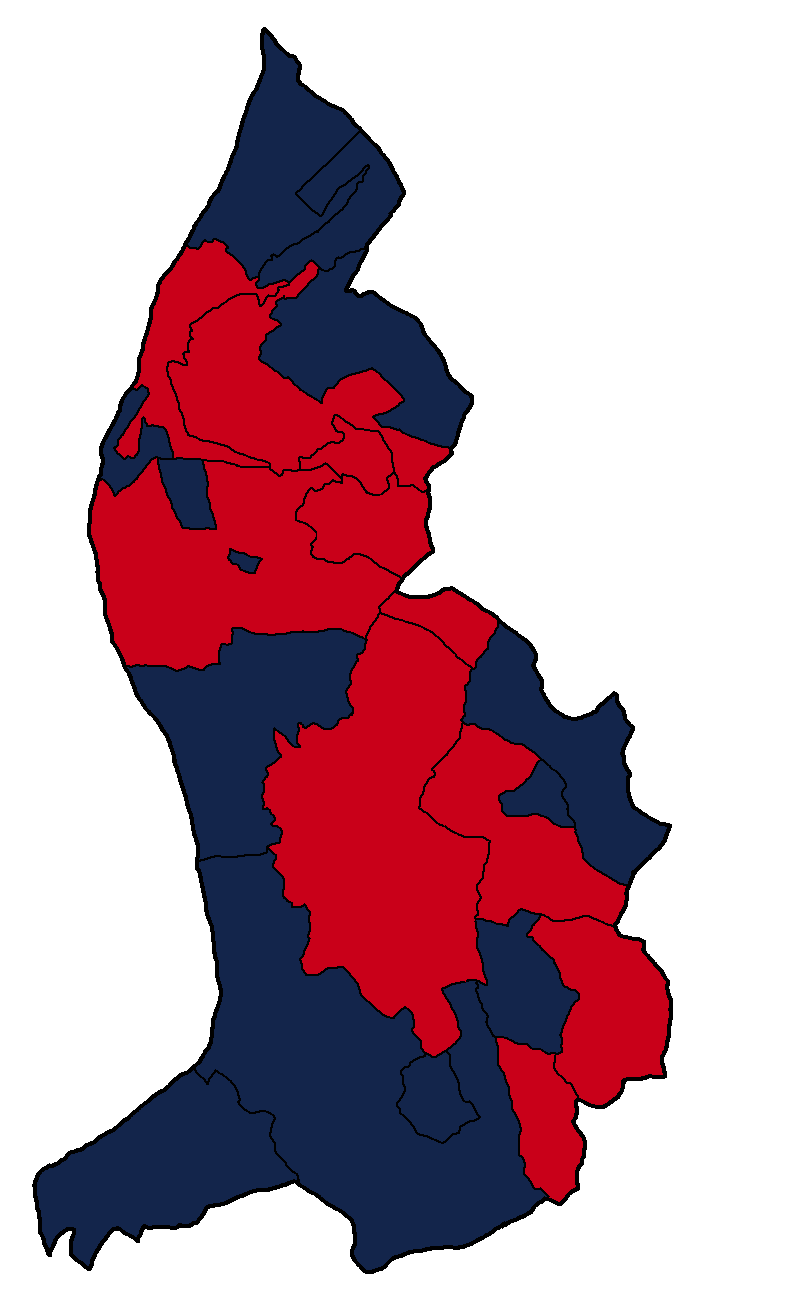
Municipalities by Mayors

=== Summary ===
Party	Votes	%	Mayors	+/–
Progressive Citizens' Party	5,964	48.6	6	▲1
Patriotic Union	6,312	51.4	5	▼1
Invalid/blank votes	2,966	–	–	–
Total	15,242	100	11	0
Registered voters/turnout	19,558	79.7	–	–
Source: Gemeindewahlen, Statistisches Jahrbuch 2016

=== By municipality ===
Municipality	Electorate	Party	Candidate	Votes	%
Balzers	2,619	Progressive Citizens' Party	Hansjörg Büchel	1,136	56.6
Balzers	2,619	Patriotic Union	Patrick Büchel	873	43.4
Eschen	2,182	Patriotic Union	Günther Kranz	1,045	64.1
Gamprin	862	Patriotic Union	Donath Oehri	474	71.9
Mauren	2,007	Progressive Citizens' Party	Freddy Kaiser	1,112	74.2
Planken	245	Patriotic Union	Rainer Beck	146	67.3
Ruggell	1,201	Progressive Citizens' Party	Maria Kaiser-Eberle	489	50.4
Ruggell	1,201	Patriotic Union	Mario Wohlwend	482	49.6
Schaan	2,986	Patriotic Union	Daniel Hilti	1,850	83.2
Schellenberg	585	Progressive Citizens' Party	Norman Wohlwend	387	78.7
Triesen	2,564	Progressive Citizens' Party	Günter Mahl	1,032	57.9
Triesen	2,564	Patriotic Union	Ernst Trefzer	750	42.1
Triesenberg	1,696	Patriotic Union	Christoph Beck	692	50.5
Triesenberg	1,696	Progressive Citizens' Party	Armin Schädler	678	49.5
Vaduz	2,611	Progressive Citizens' Party	Ewald Ospelt	1,130	60.8
Vaduz	2,611	Patriotic Union	Clemens Laternser	730	39.2
Source: Gemeindewahlen, Statistisches Jahrbuch 2016

== Municipal council elections results ==
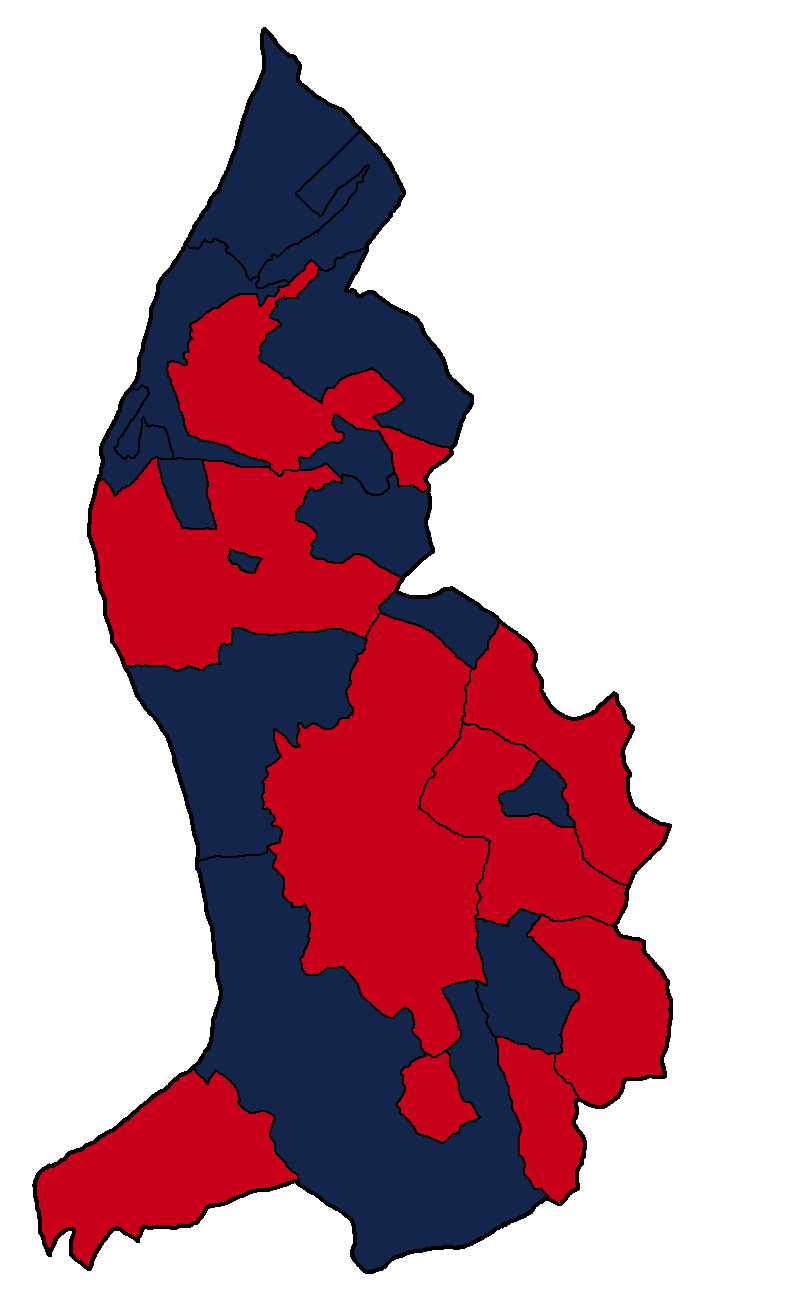
Municipalities by biggest party in each municipality's council

=== Summary ===
Party	Votes	%	Seats	+/–
Progressive Citizens' Party	64,043	44.1	52	–2
Patriotic Union	59,396	40.9	46	0
The Independents	11,248	7.7	3	New
Free List	10,647	7.3	3	–3
Total	145,334	100	104	–
Valid ballots	14,239	–		
Invalid/blank ballots	1,003	–		
Total	15,242	–		
Registered voters/turnout	19,558	79.7		
Source: Gemeindewahlen, Statistisches Jahrbuch 2020

=== By municipality ===
Municipality	Seats	Electorate	Party	Candidates	Votes	%	Seats
Balzers	10	2,619	Patriotic Union	Basil Vogt; Martin Büchel; Roswitha Vogt; Thomas Wolfinger; Martin Lenherr; German Foser; Patrizia Notaro	8,302	41.4	6
Balzers	10	2,619	Progressive Citizens' Party	Marcel Kaufmann; Manuel Frick; Thomas Eberle; Roland Tribelhorn; Fidel Frick; Jenny Vanoni; Jeannette Stocker	8,565	42.7	4
Balzers	10	2,619	The Independents	Pascal Willi	1,619	8.1	0
Balzers	10	2,619	Free List	Jangchen Thogurtsang; Sacha Schlegel	1,564	7.8	0
Eschen	10	2,182	Progressive Citizens' Party	Sylvia Pedrazzini; Fredy Allgäuer; Tino Quaderer; Albert Kindle; Gerhard Gerner; Georg Marxer; Tanja Plüss; Marcus Büchel; Mehmet Koc	5,936	38.5	5
Eschen	10	2,182	Patriotic Union	Jochen Ott; Viktor Meier; Hanno Hasler; Mario Hundertpfund; Renate Marxer; Siglinde Marxer; Werner Bieberschulte; Priska Marxer; Uwe Hoop; Gina Hasler	6,494	42.1	4
Eschen	10	2,182	The Independents	Peter Laukas	2,031	13.2	1
Eschen	10	2,182	Free List	Willy Marxer; Selin Engin	949	6.2	0
Gamprin	8	862	Progressive Citizens' Party	Thomas Hasler; Norman Hoop; Peter Marxer; Otto Kind; Simone Sulser-Hasler; Marion Schwyzer	2,671	53.1	5
Gamprin	8	862	Patriotic Union	Wolfgang Oehri; Dietmar Hasler; Nora Meier; Gilbert Kind; Beatrice Matt	2,361	46.9	3
Mauren	10	2,007	Progressive Citizens' Party	Christoph Marxer; Dominik Amman; Martine Kieber; Martin Beck; Martin Lampert; Nicole Marxer; Philipp Schafhauser; Frank Heeb; Walph Wanger; Nicole Schädler-Marock	7,480	54.1	5
Mauren	10	2,007	Patriotic Union	Patrik Schreiber; Marcel Öhri; Bruno Mayer; Martina Brändle-Nipp; Cristoph Gassner; Sascha Fehr	4,832	35.0	4
Mauren	10	2,007	Free List	Claudia Robinigg-Büchel; Nicole Oberhauser; Akif Özmen; Renate Dey	1,508	10.9	1
Planken	6	245	Progressive Citizens' Party	Josef Biedermann; Urs Kranz; Monika Stahl; Alexander Ritter; Irene Elford-Gantner	746	60.7	4
Planken	6	245	Patriotic Union	Horst Meier; Norbert Gantner	484	39.4	2
Ruggell	8	1,201	Progressive Citizens' Party	Alois Hoop; Melanie Büchel; Esther Büchel; Heinz Biedermann; Mamert Risch; Michael Büchel	4,093	53.2	4
Ruggell	8	1,201	Patriotic Union	Martin Büchel; Marion Gschwenter; Jürgen Hasler; Kevin Hasler	3,595	46.8	4
Schaan	12	2,986	Patriotic Union	Walter Frick; Rudolf Wachter; Simon Biedermann; Martin Hilti; Caroline Riegler-Rüdisser; Reinhold Zanghellini; Rainer Fehr; Hildegard Hasler; Alexander Congiu; Astrid Matt	10,134	40.6	5
Schaan	12	2,986	Progressive Citizens' Party	Markus Falk; Markus Beck; Klaus Beck; Anton Ospelt; Alexandra Konrad-Biedermann; Clarissa Frommelt; Melanie Lampert-Steiger; Cily Marxer-Risch; Klaus Brandl	8,693	34.8	5
Schaan	12	2,986	The Independents	Jakob Quaderer	3,569	14.3	1
Schaan	12	2,986	Free List	Andreas Heeb; Petra Eichele	2,576	10.3	1
Schellenberg	8	585	Progressive Citizens' Party	Andrea Kaiser-Kreuzer; Robert Hassler; Jürgen Goop; Marco Willi-Wohlwend; Jacqueline Gassner; Nicole Bolter; Andreas Hagen	1,962	53.3	4
Schellenberg	8	585	Patriotic Union	Mario Wohlwend; Christian Meier; Harald Lampert; Rebecca Lampert; Caroline Chèvre	1,308	35.5	3
Schellenberg	8	585	Free List	Patrick Risch	410	11.1	1
Triesen	10	2,564	Patriotic Union	Max Burgmeier; Jürgen Negele; Ferdinand Schurti; Daniela Wellenzohn-Erne; Piero Sprenger; Stefan Schädler; Dietmar Wohlwend; Gabriele Eberle	6,992	39.8	5
Triesen	10	2,564	Progressive Citizens' Party	Walter Kindle; Albert Kindle; Paul Kindle; Dominik Banzer; Peter Banzer; Patrick Volle; Helmut Büchel; Carole Diepen-Beck; Paul Schurte; Monika Kindle	7,388	42.0	4
Triesen	10	2,564	The Independents	Ivo Kaufmann	1,913	10.9	1
Triesen	10	2,564	Free List	Monica Derungs-Scherzer; Derya Kesci	1,297	7.4	0
Triesenberg	10	1,696	Patriotic Union	Roger Schädler; Thomas Nigg; Benjamin Eberle; Johann Beck; Matthias Beck; Anuschka Schädler; Karlheinz Frick; Simone Villamar	6,695	49.0	5
Triesenberg	10	1,696	Progressive Citizens' Party	Mario Bühler; Stefan Gassner; Jonny Sele; Edmund Beck; Fabio Gassner; Marco Strub; Marietta Beck; Peter Schädler	5,464	40.0	5
Triesenberg	10	1,696	Free List	Herbert Lageder	872	6.4	0
Triesenberg	10	1,696	The Independents	Johann Beck	619	4.5	0
Vaduz	12	2,611	Progressive Citizens' Party	Toni Real; Philip Thöny; Manfred Ospelt; Manfred Bischof; Hannelore Eller-Hemmerle; Priska Risch-Amann; Thomas Vogt; Tamara Ospelt; Lins Florin; Martin Konrad	11,045	49.7	7
Vaduz	12	2,611	Patriotic Union	Frank Konrad; Patrick Wille; Josef Feurle; Philip Schädler; Antje Moser; Martin Gassner; Hanny Büchel; Alexandra Schädler; Volker Frommelt	8,199	36.9	5
Vaduz	12	2,611	The Independents	Michael Gassner	1,497	6.7	0
Vaduz	12	2,611	Free List	Hannes Schatzmann-Krättli; Richard Brunhart	1,471	6.6	0
