= Ospelt =

Ospelt (German pronunciation: [ˈɔspɛlt]) is a German surname. Notable people with the surname include:

- Alois Ospelt (1907–1967), Liechtenstein politician
- Alois Ospelt (born 1946), Liechtenstein government councillor
- Ewald Ospelt (born 1960), Mayor of Vaduz
- Gustav Ospelt (1906–1990), Liechtenstein entrepreneur and politician
- Hilmar Ospelt (1929–2020), Deputy Prime Minister of Liechtenstein
- Josef Ospelt (1881–1962), Prime Minister of Liechtenstein
- Justin Ospelt (born 1999), Bahamian footballer
- Karlheinz Ospelt (born 1961), Liechtenstein trustee and politician
- Ludwig Ospelt (1882–1949), Liechtenstein politician
- Marco Ospelt (born 1948), Liechtenstein politician
- Meinrad Ospelt (politician, born 1844) (1844–1934), Liechtenstein politician
- Meinrad Ospelt (politician, born 1906) (1906–1983), Liechtenstein politician
- Oskar Ospelt (1908–1988), Liechtenstein sprinter
- Philipp Ospelt (born 1992), Liechtensteiner football striker
- Wolfgang Ospelt (1965–2022), Liechtensteiner former football player
