= 2023 Vaduz elections =

- 5 March 2023
- Mayoral election
- Turnout: 71.11%
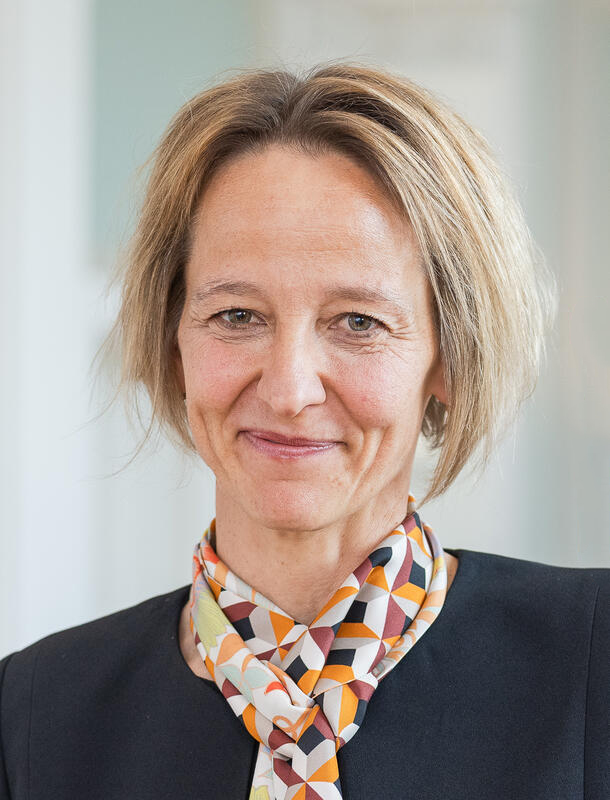

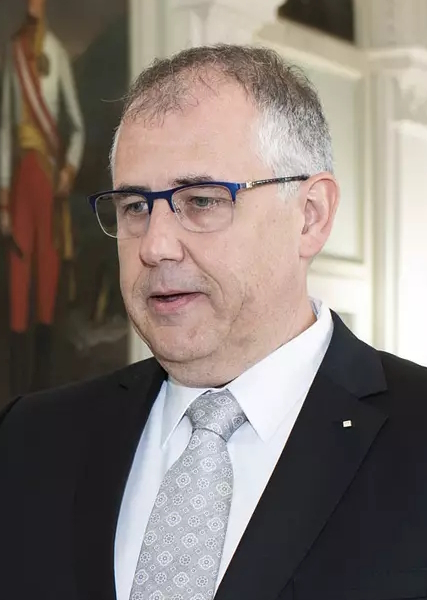
Candidate	Petra Miescher	Manfred Bischof
Party	VU	FBP
Popular vote	1053	850
Percentage	55.33%	44.67%
Mayor before election
Manfred Bischof
FBP
Elected mayor
Petra Miescher
VU
- Municipal Council election
- All 12 seats in the municipal council 7 seats needed for a majority
Party	Vote %	Seats	+/–
Progressive Citizens' Party	41.35	6	+1
Patriotic Union	41.25	4	−1
Free List	9.93	1	+1
Democrats for Liechtenstein	7.47	1	−1
This lists parties that won seats. See the complete results below.

Elections were held in Vaduz on 5 March 2023 to elect the mayor of Vaduz and the Vaduz municipal council. Incumbent mayor Manfred Bischof of the Progressive Citizens' Party lost re-election to challenger Petra Miescher of the Patriotic Union, whereas the FBP won six seats in the municipal council, with the VU winning four. The Free List and Democrats for Liechtenstein both won one seat.

== Background ==
Incumbent mayor Manfred Bischof announced that he was seeking re-election as mayor on 8 April 2022. The VU nominated Petra Miescher for mayor on 26 September, being the first woman nominated for the position. The FBP and VU presented their candidates for the municipal council on 23 November and 31 October respectively.

== Electoral system ==
The 12-person municipal council is elected by open list proportional representation. Voters vote for a party list and then may strike through candidates they do not wish to cast a preferential vote for and may add names of candidates from other lists.

The mayor is elected by a majority vote. If none of the candidates achieve a majority in the first round, a second round would be held four weeks later, where the candidate with a plurality would be elected as a mayor.

== Results ==
=== Mayoral election ===
Miescher defeated Bischof and became the next mayor of Vaduz, assuming the office on 1 May 2023. However, she resigned the office on 24 May 2024 due to ongoing heath issues, and a by-election was held on 25 August the same year.

Candidate	Party	Votes	%
Petra Miescher	Patriotic Union	1,053	55.33
Manfred Bischof	Progressive Citizens' Party	850	44.67
Total		1,903	100.00
Valid votes		1,903	94.39
Invalid votes		29	1.44
Blank votes		84	4.17
Total votes		2,016	100.00
Registered voters/turnout		2,835	71.11
Source: Gemeindewahlen

=== Municipal council election ===
Party	Votes	%	Seats	+/–
Progressive Citizens' Party	9,522	41.35	6	+1
Patriotic Union	9,500	41.25	4	–1
Democrats for Liechtenstein	2,286	9.93	1	+1
Free List	1,720	7.47	1	–1
Total	23,028	100.00	12	0
Valid votes	1,919	95.19		
Invalid votes	70	3.47		
Blank votes	27	1.34		
Total votes	2,016	100.00		
Registered voters/turnout	2,835	71.11		
Source: Gemeindewahlen

Seats	Electorate	Party	Candidates	Votes	%	Seats
12	2,835	Progressive Citizens' Party	Florian Meier; Priska Risch-Amann; André Rumpold; Ruth Ospelt-Niepelt; Philip Thöny; Christine Tinner-Rampone; Yvonne Ospelt; Urs Kobald	9,522	41.3	6
12	2,835	Patriotic Union	Antje Moser; Natascha Söldi; Daniela Ospelt; Josef Feurle; Petra Miescher; Claudia Bartholdi; Isabella Heeb; Andreas Eberle; Thomas Keller	9,500	41.3	4
12	2,835	Democrats for Liechtenstein	Pascal Büttiker	2,286	9.9	1
12	2,835	Free List	Jakob Becker	1,720	7.5	1
Source: Gemeindewahlen
