= 2003 Liechtenstein local elections =

- 2 February 2003

The 2003 Liechtenstein local elections were held on 2 February to elect the municipal councils and the mayors of the eleven municipalities of Liechtenstein.

== Electoral system ==
The municipal councils (German: Gemeinderat) are composed of an even number of councillors plus the mayor (German: Gemeindevorsteher). The number of councillors is determined by population count: 6 or 8 councillors for population 1,500, 8 or 10 councillors for population between 1,500 and 3,000, and 10 or 12 councillors for population over 3,000.

Councillors were elected in single multi-member districts, consisting of the municipality's territory, using an open list proportional representation system. Voting was on the basis of universal suffrage in a secret ballot. The mayors were elected in a two-round system. If none of the candidates achieved a majority in the first round, a second round would have been held four weeks later, where the candidate with a plurality would be elected as a mayor.

== Mayoral elections results ==
=== Summary ===
Party	Votes	%	Mayors	+/–
Progressive Citizens' Party	5,793	47.7	6	▲1
Patriotic Union	5,570	45.8	5	▼1
Free List	195	1.6	0	0
Independents	595	4.9	0	New
Invalid/blank votes	1,329	–	–	–
Total	13,482	100	11	0
Registered voters/turnout	16,903	79.8	–	–
Source: Gemeindewahlen, Statistisches Jahrbuch 2004

=== By municipality ===
Municipality	Electorate	Party	Candidate	Votes	%
Balzers	2,333	Progressive Citizens' Party	Anton Eberle	1,036	56.2
Balzers	2,333	Patriotic Union	Erich Frick	808	43.8
Eschen	1,856	Progressive Citizens' Party	Gregor Ott	1,034	74.2
Eschen	1,856	Patriotic Union	Norbert Goop	360	25.8
Gamprin	657	Patriotic Union	Donath Oeri	380	69.1
Mauren	1,632	Progressive Citizens' Party	Freddy Kaiser	666	52.8
Mauren	1,632	Independent	Andrea Matt	595	47.2
Planken	216	Progressive Citizens' Party	Gaston Jehle	127	66.8
Ruggell	978	Patriotic Union	Jakob Büchel	482	59.7
Schaan	2,700	Patriotic Union	Daniel Hilti	1,110	54.0
Schaan	2,700	Progressive Citizens' Party	Helmut Konrad	945	46.0
Schellenberg	502	Progressive Citizens' Party	Norman Wohlwend	334	76.6
Triesen	2,147	Progressive Citizens' Party	Xaver Hoch	912	59.0
Triesen	2,147	Patriotic Union	Wolfgang Kindle	438	28.3
Triesen	2,147	Free List	Norman Nigsch	195	12.6
Triesenberg	1,542	Patriotic Union	Hubert Sele	964	79.9
Vaduz	2,340	Patriotic Union	Karlheinz Ospelt	1,028	58.2
Vaduz	2,340	Progressive Citizens' Party	Markus Verling	739	41.8
Source: Gemeindewahlen, Statistisches Jahrbuch 2004

== Municipal council elections results ==
=== Summary ===
Party	Votes		Seats	
Party	Votes	%	Total	+/–
Progressive Citizens' Party	64,665	47.7	52	▼3
Patriotic Union	62,229	45.8	46	▲1
Free List	9,590	1.6	7	▲1
Independents	1,212	4.9	1	▲1
Total votes	137,696	100	106	0
Valid ballots	13,039	–	–	–
Invalid/blank ballots	443	–	–	–
Total	13,482	100	–	–
Registered voters/turnout	16,903	79.8	–	–
Source: Gemeindewahlen, Statistisches Jahrbuch 2004

=== By municipality ===
Constituency	Seats	Electorate	Party	Candidates	Votes	%	Swing	Seats	+/–
Balzers	12	2,333	Patriotic Union	Norbert Bürzle; Jürgen Vogt; Patrick Büchel; Alex Vogt; Franz Wille; Albert Vogt; Hanspeter Vogt; Edith Maier-Vogt; Andrea Möhr; Thomas Vogt	11,089	49.3	▼6.5	7	▲1
Balzers	12	2,333	Progressive Citizens' Party	Helmuth Büchel; Adolf Nigg; Peter Frick; Marcel Gstöhl; Stephan Büchel; Ronald Kaufmann; Siegrid Schmid-Vogt; Helene Nüesch-Frick; Sonja Strauss-Fischer	9,213	40.9	▼3.3	4	▼2
Balzers	12	2,333	Free List	Markus Willie; Elisabeth Tellenbach-Frick	2,198	9.8	New	1	New
Eschen	10	1,856	Progressive Citizens' Party	Benno Gerner; Hanni Hoop; Daniel Oehry; Reto Meier; Christoph Allgäuer; Claudio Marxer; René Ritter; Albert Kindle; Pia Hörndlinger; Karl Loacker	7,401	52.1	▲2.5	5	▲1
Eschen	10	1,856	Patriotic Union	Kurt Gerner; Werner Bieberschulte; Michael Gerner; Marlies Amann; Christl Gstöhl; Paul Eberle; Karlheinz Walser; Simon Schächle; Ilse-Karolina Frommelt-Wohlwend; Mary Senti	6,809	47.9	▼2.5	5	▼1
Gamprin	8	657	Progressive Citizens' Party	Erna Näscher-Hasler; Peter Oehri; Thomas Müssner; Monika Büchel; Norman Kind; Christian Gstöhl; Catherine Breuss-Hassler	2,256	53.7	▲3.0	5	0
Gamprin	8	657	Patriotic Union	Vroni Sprecher-Marxer; Wolfgang Oehri; Manuela Jäger; Berno Nigg; Othmar Wohlwend	1,944	46.3	▼3.0	3	0
Mauren	10	1,632	Progressive Citizens' Party	Dietmar Marxer; Doris Wohlwend; Michael Biedermann; Raimund Kieber; Michael Ritter; Walburga Matt; Wolfgang Senti; Simon Meier; Bruno Matt; Paul Kaiser	7,226	57.2	▼3.7	6	0
Mauren	10	1,632	Patriotic Union	Gabi Büchel-Meier; Theo Oehri; Claudia Pfeiffer; Wolfgang Ritter; Jürgen Matt	4,034	31.9	▲1.2	3	0
Mauren	10	1,632	Free List	Ingrid Allaart-Batliner	1,380	10.9	▲2.5	1	0
Planken	6	216	Progressive Citizens' Party	Petra Walter-Wenzel; Gerhard Hermann; Monika Stahl; Patrik Oehri; Adolf Jehle	552	52.0	▲0.7	3	0
Planken	6	216	Free List	Christian Beck; Luzia Walch-Schädler	270	25.4	▲4.3	2	0
Planken	6	216	Patriotic Union	Stefan Gantner; Ralph Beck	240	22.6	▼5.0	1	0
Ruggell	8	978	Progressive Citizens' Party	Robert Walch; Willi Büchel; Maria Kaiser-Eberle; Gerlinde Büchel; Hans Oehri Jr. Leopold Senti; Philippe Lemaire; Marie-Luise Stoffel-Büchel	3,455	55.3	▲2.4	5	0
Ruggell	8	978	Patriotic Union	Peter Biedermann; Martin Oehry; Denise Büchel; Blanca Grassmayr; Carin Vorburger; Norman Hasler	2,793	44.7	▼2.4	3	0
Schaan	12	2,700	Progressive Citizens' Party	Albert Frick; Hubert Hilti; Eugen Nägele; Edith De Boni; Wally Frommelt; Dagobert Oehri; Bruno Walser; Manfred Bischof; Anton Felder; Franco Gerstgrasser; Sigrid Thöny-Bartel; Katharina Strässle	11,274	45.3	▼3.2	6	0
Schaan	12	2,700	Patriotic Union	Jack Quaderer; Rudolf Wachter; Bruno Nipp; Karin Rüdisser-Quaderer; Wido Meier; Werner Frick; Norbert Ritter; Peter Nigg; Ursula Kaufmann; Alexandra Risch; Martin Matt; Judith Davida-Morscher	11,095	44.5	▲3.7	5	0
Schaan	12	2,700	Free List	Daniel Walser	2,543	10.2	▼0.5	1	0
Schellenberg	8	502	Progressive Citizens' Party	Roswitha Goop; Sandra Müller; Edwin Wohlwend; Hansjörg Risch; Markus Hassler; Josef Büchel; Eduard Büchel; Patrik Kaiser	1,962	57.0	▼3.8	4	▼1
Schellenberg	8	502	Patriotic Union	Dietmar Lampert; Edy Hassler; Adrian Wohlwend; Marianne Hasler; Ulrich Lampert; Hannes Clavadetscher; Theo Hasler; Dora Wohlwend	1,478	43.0	▲3.8	4	▲1
Triesen	10	2,147	Patriotic Union	Uwe Bargetze; Gebhard Negele; Marianne Heeb; Eugen Nutt; Peter Strunk; Klaus-Dieter Kindle; Markus Schädler; Marion Kindle; Christl Gassner; Daniel Feger	6,828	44.7	▼4.6	5	0
Triesen	10	2,147	Progressive Citizens' Party	Florin Banzer; Remy Kindle; Marco Sprenger; Ralph Beck; Christa Bechter-Erni; Franz Josef Beck; Beat Spreiter; Dietmar Kieber; Monika Forster-Rehak; Astrid Eidenbenz-Wanger	7,089	46.6	▲5.3	4	0
Triesen	10	2,147	Free List	Edgar Bargetze; Monica D. Bortolotti	1,373	9.0	▼0.6	1	0
Triesenberg	10	1,542	Patriotic Union	Franz Beck; Johannes Biedermann; Walter Schädler; Luzia Büchel; Walter Beck; Anton Schädler; Franz Gassner; Ivo Beck; Günter Frei; Gaudenz Sele	6,200	53.0	▼3.7	5	▲1
Triesenberg	10	1,542	Progressive Citizens' Party	Rainer Schädler; Hanspeter Gassner; Anton Frommelt; Andrea Eberle; Normann Bühler; Karin Beck; Arno Gassner; Alois Beck; Erwin Bühler; Gerhard Elkuch	4,278	36.6	▲2.4	4	0
Triesenberg	10	1,542	Independent	Klaus Schädler; Eugen Beck	1,212	10.4	New	1	New
Vaduz	12	2,340	Progressive Citizens' Party	Emby Schreiber; Norman Marxer; Walter Boss; Susanne Eberle-Strub; Heinz Dörig; Hansrudi Sele; Markus Meier; Hugo Hasler; Ursula Frick; Peter Ospelt; Karin Theiner; Korbinian Gattinger	9,959	46.3	▲2.5	6	▲1
Vaduz	12	2,340	Patriotic Union	Roland Moser; Jürgen Beck; Frank Konrad; Alice Hagen; Waltraud Schlegel-Biedermann; Lorenz Gassner; Wilhelm Gerster; Rony Bargetze; Thomas Zwiefelhofer; Volker Frommelt; Georges Berger; Isabelle Hoop	9,719	45.2	▼2.1	5	0
Vaduz	12	2,340	Free List	Frick Kaspar	1,826	8.5	▼0.4	1	0
Source: Gemeindewahlen, Statistisches Jahrbuch 2004
