= 2019 Vaduz elections =

- Mayoral election
24 March 2019 (first round); 14 April 2019 (second round)
- Turnout: 73.89%
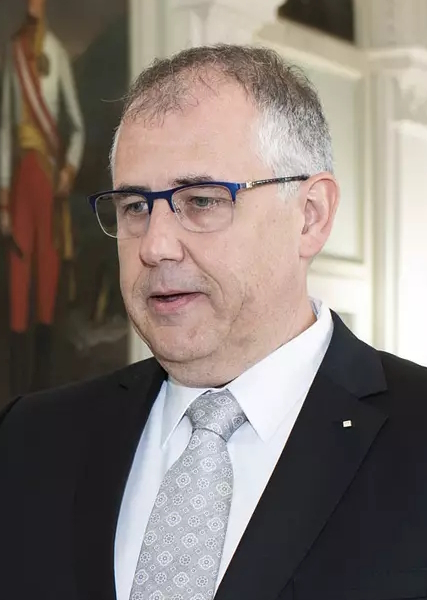

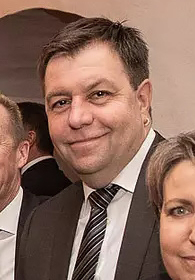
Candidate	Manfred Bischof	Frank Konrad
Party	FBP	VU
Popular vote	996	892
Percentage	50.58%	45.30%
Mayor before election
Ewald Ospelt
FBP
Elected mayor
Manfred Bischof
FBP
- Municipal Council election
- 24 March 2019
- All 12 seats in the municipal council 7 seats needed for a majority
Party	Vote %	Seats	+/–
Progressive Citizens' Party	41.58	6	−1
Patriotic Union	39.45	4	−1
Free List	16.09	2	+2
This lists parties that won seats. See the complete results below.

Elections were held in Vaduz on 24 March and 14 April 2019 to elect the mayor of Vaduz and the Vaduz municipal council. Incumbent mayor Ewald Ospelt did not seek re-election. Manfred Bischof of the Progressive Citizens' Party defeated Frank Konrad of the Patriotic Union, whereas both parties won a joint five seats in the municipal council, with the Free List winning two.

== Background ==
Incumbent mayor Ewald Ospelt was expected to run for a fourth term, but in October 2018 he declared his intention to not do so. The FBP nominated Manfred Bischof, whereas the VU nominated Landtag member Frank Konrad, both in the same month. The FBP presented its candidates for the municipal council on 28 October.

The Free List nominated René Hasler for mayor in August 2018. Giovanna Gould, an artist originally from the United States, ran as an independent candidate. She had previously unsuccessfully ran for a seat in the Landtag of Liechtenstein in the 2013 Liechtenstein general election as a member of The Independents.

== Electoral system ==
The 12-person municipal council is elected by open list proportional representation. Voters vote for a party list and then may strike through candidates they do not wish to cast a preferential vote for and may add names of candidates from other lists.

The mayor is elected by a majority vote. If none of the candidates achieve a majority in the first round, a second round would be held four weeks later, where the candidate with a plurality would be elected as a mayor.

== Results ==
=== Mayoral election ===
Candidate	Party	First round		Second round	
Candidate	Party	Votes	%	Votes	%
Manfred Bischof	Progressive Citizens' Party	748	39.56	996	50.58
Frank Konrad	Patriotic Union	739	39.08	892	45.30
René Hasler	Free List	313	16.55		
Giovanna Gould	Independent	91	4.81	81	4.11
Total		1,891	100.00	1,969	100.00
Valid votes		1,891	93.75	1,969	96.76
Invalid votes		67	3.32	31	1.52
Blank votes		59	2.93	35	1.72
Total votes		2,017	100.00	2,035	100.00
Registered voters/turnout		2,754	73.24	2,754	73.89
Source: Gemeindewahlen, Gemeindewahlen

=== Municipal council election ===
Party	Votes	%	Seats	+/–
Progressive Citizens' Party	9,521	41.58	5	–2
Patriotic Union	9,033	39.45	5	0
Free List	3,684	16.09	2	+2
The Independents	658	2.87	0	0
Total	22,896	100.00	12	0
Valid votes	1,908	94.60		
Invalid votes	82	4.07		
Blank votes	27	1.34		
Total votes	2,017	100.00		
Registered voters/turnout	2,754	73.24		
Source: Gemeindewahlen

Seats	Electorate	Party	Candidates	Votes	%	Seats
12	2,754	Progressive Citizens' Party	Toni Real; Philip Thöny; Priska Risch-Amann; Hannelore Eller-Hemmerle; Ruth Ospelt-Niepelt; Georg Ospelt; Benjamin Fischer; Willy Vogt; Nicole Wäger	9,521	41.6	5
12	2,754	Patriotic Union	Petra Miescher; Antje Moser; Natascha Söldi; Daniela Ospelt; Josef Feurle; Rainer Tschütscher; Philippe Hefti; Patrick Wille; Maylin Roth-Wachter; Martin Gassner; Philip Schädler; Volker Frommelt	9,033	39.5	5
12	2,754	Free List	Stefanie Hasler; Stephan Gstöhl; Rahel Rauter; Manuel Kieber	3,684	16.1	1
12	2,754	The Independents	Bianca Risch	658	2.9	0
Source: Gemeindewahlen

== Aftermath ==
In July 2019, Konrad was convicted of violating official secrecy when during the campaign for mayor when revealed how Bischof and Ospelt voted regarding the purchase of the Engel building in October 2015. Though he appealed the conviction, it was ultimately upheld in 2021 and he was fined 15,600 CHF.
