= 2010 Liechtenstein approach road referendum =

- 14 March 2010
- Referendum on building an approach road for an industrial zone in Schaan

Results
Choice	Votes	%
Yes	6,414	51.89%
No	5,946	48.11%
Valid votes	12,360	96.01%
Invalid or blank votes	514	3.99%
Total votes	12,874	100.00%
Registered voters/turnout	18,670	68.96%
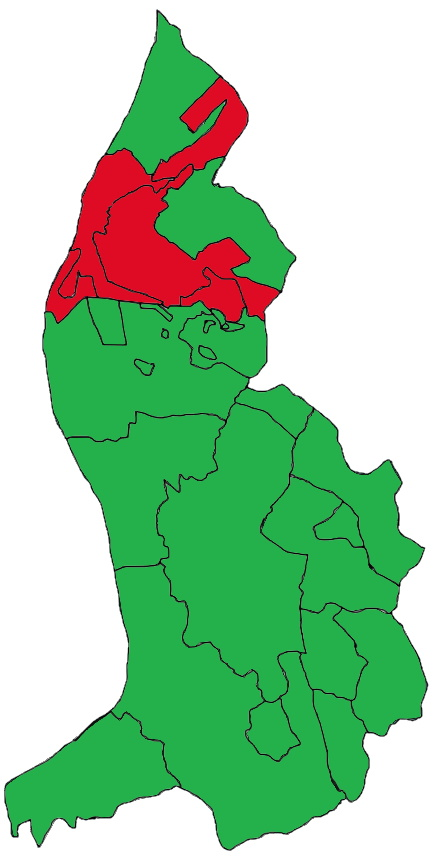
- Results by municipality

A referendum on building an approach road for an industrial zone in Schaan was held in Liechtenstein on 14 March 2010. The proposal was approved by 52% of voters.

== Background ==
On 18 November 2009 the Landtag voted 18–7 to spend 15 million francs on an approach road for an industrial zone in Schaan. The road would be 1.4km long, although 75% of the route was already roadway. A separate cycle and pedestrian path would also be created alongside the road.

The Free List and Transport Club Liechtenstein (VCL) believed it to be the first step in attempts to build a bypass and started an attempt to force a referendum. Between 29 November and 23 December they collected 1,257 signatures, surpassing the requirement of 1,000 in Article 66 of the constitution.

== Results ==
Due to an error in the count, the reported total number of votes was lower than the sum of the valid and invalid votes.

Choice	Votes	%
For	6,414	51.89
Against	5,946	48.11
Invalid/blank votes	517	–
Total	12,874	100
Registered voters/turnout	18,670	68.96
Source: Liechtenstein Government
