= Andrea Matt =

Liechtenstein politician (born 1961)

Member of the Landtag of Liechtenstein for Unterland
- In office 13 March 2005 – 8 February 2009

Personal details
- Born: 29 April 1961 (age 65) Chur, Switzerland
- Party: Free List
- Children: 1

Andrea Matt (born 29 April 1961) is a politician and Liechtenstein who served in the Landtag of Liechtenstein from 2005 to 2009.

== Life ==
Matt was born on 29 April 1961 in Grabs as the daughter of dental technician Egon Matt and Waltraud (née Ritter) as one of five children, including Cornelia Gassner. She attended high school in Vaduz before studying design and communication design in Nuremberg, she received a degree in advertising management. She studied law in Linz and received a certificate as a science journalist in 2011.

From 1986 to 1999 she worked in positions in public relations, customer service, advertising and computer graphics in Switzerland and Germany. From 1999 to 2011, she ran her own graphics and computer-aided design company in Mauren, AM Design AG. She has also been the managing director of the Liechtenstein society for environmental protection.

Matt was a member of the Mauren school board from 2003 to 2007. She was a member of the Landtag of Liechtenstein from 2005 to 2009 as a member of the Free List. During this time, she was a member of the audit committee and the Free List's spokesperson in the Landtag from 2007 to 2009. She unsuccessfully ran for re-election in the 2009 elections, which was referred to by the Liechtensteiner Volksblatt as a "bitter loss".

She was a judge at the Princely High Court from 2010 to 2012. Since 2019, she has been a member of the Mauren municipal council. During this time, she has opposed the construction of a road tunnel from Mauren to Feldkirch.

She lives in Mauren and has one child.
