= Alois Ospelt =

Liechtenstein government councillor (born 1946)

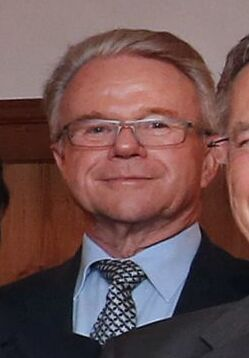
- Ospelt in 2014

Government councillor for Interior, Culture, Sport, Environment, Agriculture and Forestry
- In office 5 April 2001 – 21 April 2005
- Prime Minister: Otmar Hasler
- Deputy: Alex Hermann

Member of the Landtag of Liechtenstein for Oberland
- In office 5 March 1989 – 7 February 1993

Personal details
- Born: 31 January 1946 (age 80) Vaduz, Liechtenstein
- Party: Progressive Citizens' Party
- Spouse: Ruth Wenaweser (m. 1971)
- Relations: Ewald Ospelt (brother)
- Children: 3

Alois Ospelt (born 31 January 1946) is a historian and politician from Liechtenstein who served as a government councillor from 2001 to 2005. He previously served in the Landtag of Liechtenstein from 1989 to 1993.

== Life ==
Ospelt was born on 31 January 1946 in Vaduz as the son of Otto Ospelt and Rosalie (née Kind) as one of five children. From 1962 he studied history and education at the University of Freiburg and the University of Vienna, where he graduated with a doctorate in 1972.

He was a secondary school teacher in Vaduz from 1972 to 1974 and also a research assistance for the Liechtenstein National Archives. From 1974 to 2001 he was the director of the Liechtenstein State Library. He was president of the Historical Association for the Principality of Liechtenstein from 1986 to 1996. As a historian, Ospelt's works have included the economic and administrative history of Liechtenstein.

From 1979 to 1986 he was a member of the Vaduz municipal council as a member of the Progressive Citizens' Party. He was a member of the Landtag of Liechtenstein from 1989 to 1993. During this time, he was the party's spokesman in the Landtag from 1989 to 1991. From 5 April 2001 to 21 April 2005 he was a government councillor in the first Otmar Hasler cabinet. In this position, his roles were the interior, culture, sport, environment, agriculture and forestry.

Ospelt married Ruth Wenaweser on 31 July 1971 and they have three children together. His brother Ewald Ospelt served as the mayor of Vaduz from 2007 to 2019. In January 2026, to mark his 80th birthday, he was made an honorary citizen of Vaduz.

== Honours ==
- Liechtenstein: Commander's Cross with Star of the Order of Merit of the Principality of Liechtenstein (2003)
