= Franz Wachter =

Mayor of Vaduz from 1909 to 1912

Mayor of Vaduz
- In office 1909–1912
- Preceded by: Adolf Real
- Succeeded by: Adolf Real

Personal details
- Born: 3 December 1850 Vaduz, Liechtenstein
- Died: 4 March 1923 (aged 72) Vaduz, Liechtenstein
- Spouse: Mathilda Laternser (m. 1881; died 1921)
- Relations: Johann Alois Schlegel (grandfather)
- Children: 13

Franz Josef Wachter (3 December 1850 – 4 March 1923) was a farmer and politician from Liechtenstein who served as the mayor of Vaduz from 1909 to 1912.

== Life ==
Wachter was born on 3 December 1850 in Vaduz as the son of Thaddäus Wachter and Theresia (née Schlegel) as one of five children. He worked as a butcher and farmer.

He was the Vaduz municipal treasurer from 1879 to 1882 and then a member of the Vaduz municipal council from 1882 to 1885. He was the deputy mayor of the municipality on three occasions; from 1885 to 1891, 1894 to 1897, and finally from 1903 to 1906. He was mayor from 1909 to 1912. During this time, the Vaduz water supply was established in 1910.

He was also the administrator of the Vaduz poorhouse. In 1894, Wachter sold his wife's share of the Gaflei spa resort to Karl Schädler.

Wachter married Mathilda Laternser (14 May 1855 – 27 January 1921) on 21 November 1881 and they had thirteen children together. On 4 March 1923, Wachter was found dead having suffered a gunshot wound. A subsequent investigation determined his death to be a result of a robbery. He was 72 years old.
