= Mario Wohlwend =

Liechtenstein politician (born 1973)

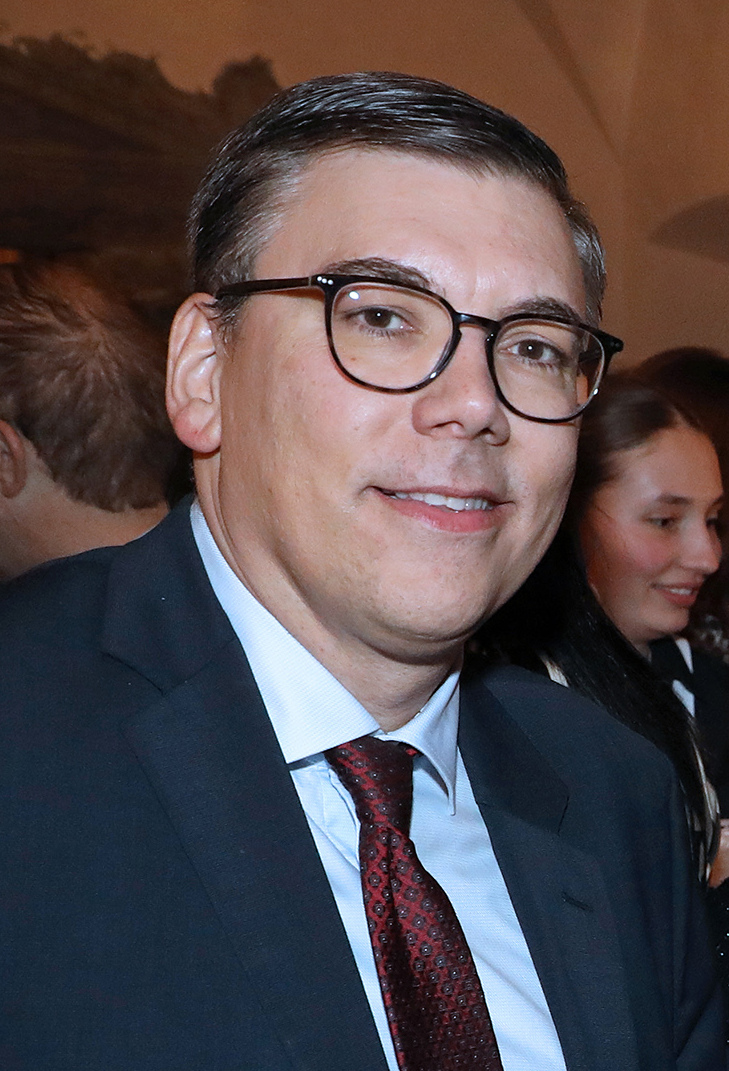
- Wohlwend in 2025

Member of the Landtag of Liechtenstein for Unterland
- In office 5 February 2017 – 9 February 2025

Personal details
- Born: 12 January 1973 (age 53) Chur, Switzerland
- Party: Patriotic Union
- Spouse: Silke Bischof (m. 2000)
- Children: 2

Mario Wohlwend (born 12 January 1973) is a politician from Liechtenstein who served in the Landtag of Liechtenstein from 2017 to 2025. A member of the Patriotic Union (VU), he has served as the party's president since 2026.

== Life ==
Wohlwend was born 12 January 1973 in Chur as the son of Johann Wohlwend and Margrith (née Risch) as one of five children. He attended secondary school in Eschen. He conducted an apprenticeship as a machine draftsman at Hilti in Schaan from 1989 to 1993, and from 1994 to 2000 he worked at as a project manager at Hofag AG in Schaan. Since 2000 he has worked as a trainer for designers at Hilti and since 2001 he has been an examination expert for intermediate and final apprenticeship examinations as a designer.

From 2011 to 2015 he was a member of the Ruggell municipal council as a member of the Patriotic Union. He was the party's candidate for mayor of Ruggell in 2015, but he narrowly lost to Maria Kaiser-Eberle of the Progressive Citizens' Party (FBP). He was a member of the Landtag of Liechtenstein from 2017 to 2025, and he was a member of the audit committee from 2021 to 2025. He was the head of the Liechtenstein delegation to the Inter-Parliamentary Union from 2017 to 2021.

Wohlwend was again the VU's candidate for mayor of Ruggell in the 2023 election, but he lost to Christian Öhri of the FBP. He has been a deputy member of the Landtag since the 2025 elections. Since 24 June 2026, Wohlwend has been president of the VU, succeeding Thomas Zwiefelhofer.

Wohlwend married Silke Bischof on 5 August 2000 and they have two children together. He lives in Ruggell.
