= Wolfgang Ospelt =

Liechtensteiner footballer

Personal information
- Date of birth: 5 January 1965
- Place of birth: Liechtenstein
- Date of death: 4 September 2022 (aged 57)
- Position: Midfielder

Senior career*
Years	Team	Apps	(Gls)
1989–1995	FC Vaduz		

International career
1990–1995	Liechtenstein	10	(0)
- * Club domestic league appearances and goals

Wolfgang Ospelt (5 January 1965 - 4 September 2022) was a Liechtensteiner former association football player. He played as a midfielder. Between 1990 and 1995, Ospelt won 10 caps for the Liechtenstein national football team.
