= Christoph Beck =

Liechtenstein engineer and politician (born 1978)

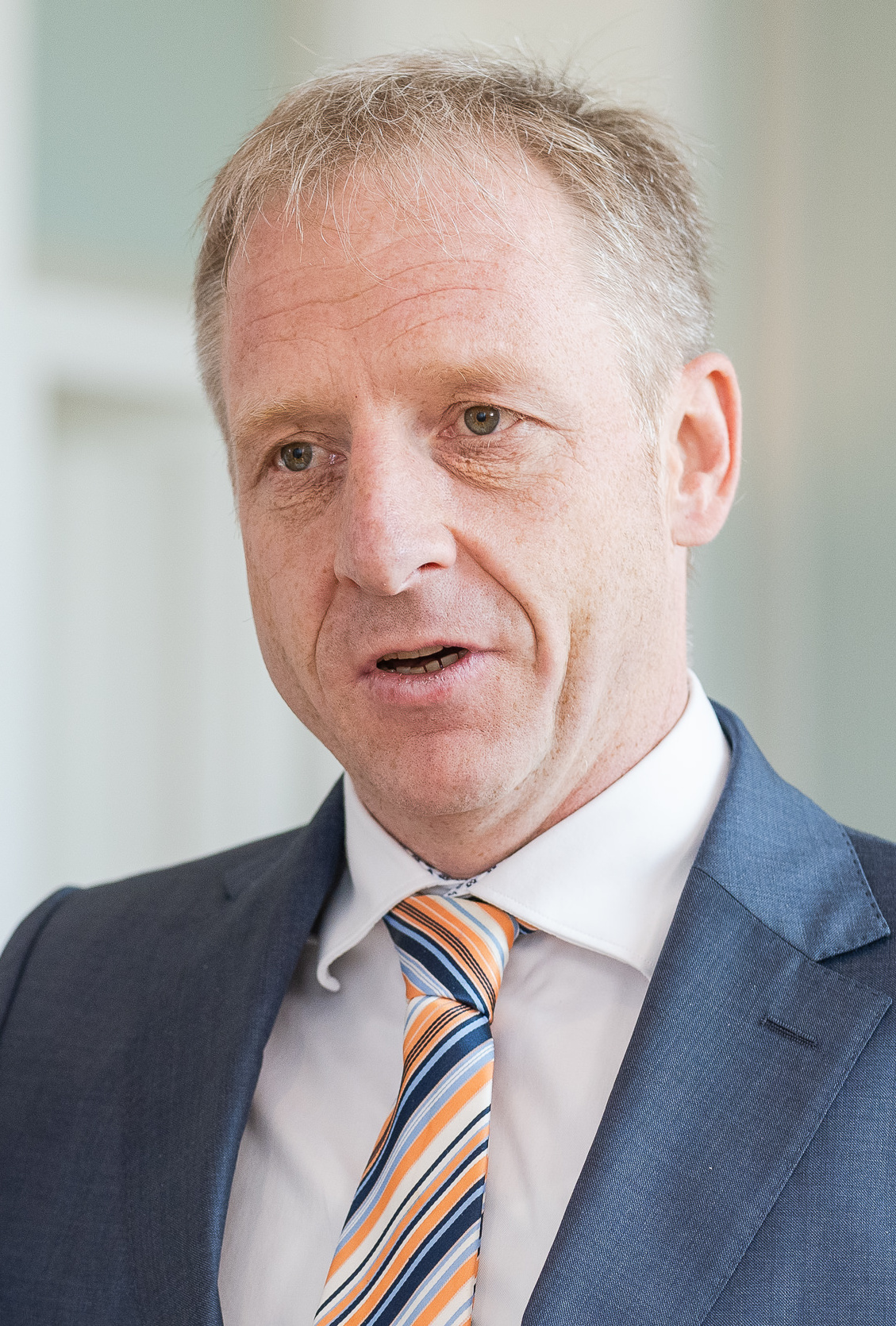
- Beck in 2023

Member of the Landtag of Liechtenstein for Oberland
- In office 3 February 2013 – 5 February 2017

Mayor of Triesenberg
- Incumbent
- Assumed office 1 May 2015
- Deputy: Normann Bühler (2023–); Reto Eberle (2019–2023); Stephan Gassner (2016–2019); Mario Bühler (2015–2016)
- Preceded by: Hubert Sele

Personal details
- Born: 17 October 1978 (age 47) Grabs, Switzerland
- Party: Patriotic Union)
- Spouse: Nadia Maria Marxer (m. 2006)
- Children: 3

Christoph Beck (born 17 October 1978) is an engineer and politician from Liechtenstein who served in the Landtag of Liechtenstein from 2013 to 2017. He has also served as the mayor of Triesenberg since 2015.

== Life ==
Beck was born on 17 October 1978 in Grabs as the son of Erich Beck and Beatrice (née Vogt) as one of three children. He trained as an electrical fitter in Triesen before training as an electrical engineer at IBZ in Zurich; from 2008 to 2010 he conducted postgraduate studies at the University of Liechtenstein. From 1998 to 2003 Beck worked as an electrical fitter and project manager at Elektro Risch AG in Triesen and then as a laboratory technician and hardware developer at Unaxis Balzers AG in Balzers; he later worked as a product manager at Telecom Liechtenstein AG from 2006 to 2010 and as a site manager Etavis Grossenbacher AG from 2011 to 2015, both in Vaduz.

Beck was elected as a member of the Landtag of Liechtenstein in 2013 as a member of the Patriotic Union (VU); during this time, he was a member of the EEA commission and of the Liechtenstein delegation to the Lake Constance Parliamentary Commission. Beck was elected as the mayor of Triesenberg in 2015, narrowly defeating Armin Schädler of the Progressive Citizens' Party (FBP) by a margin of 14 votes. Due to his desire to focus on his duties as mayor, Beck did not seek re-election to the Landtag in the 2017 elections.

As mayor, Beck has supported the construction of a new centre in the municipality; however, the proposed changes were rejected in a local referendum on 22 May 2022. He was re-elected unopposed in 2019, and was again re-elected for a third term in 2023, defeating challenger Mario Bühler of the FBP.

Beck married Nadia Maria Marxer on 6 June 2006 and they have three children together. He lives in Triesenberg.
