= Frank Konrad =

Liechtenstein businessman and politician (born 1967)

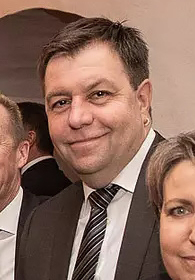
- Konrad in 2019

Member of the Landtag of Liechtenstein for Oberland
- In office 3 February 2013 – 7 February 2021

Personal details
- Born: 9 May 1967 (age 58) Vaduz, Liechtenstein
- Party: Patriotic Union
- Spouse: Ilse Gassner (m. 2007)
- Children: 1

Frank Konrad (born 9 May 1967) is a businessman and politician from Liechtenstein who served in the Landtag of Liechtenstein from 2013 to 2021.

== Life ==
Konrad was born on 9 May 1967 in Vaduz as the son of Josef Konrad and Hedwig (née Isser) as one of three children. He attended school in Vaduz before conducting an apprenticeship at PAV Präzisions Apparatebau Vaduz AG from 1983 to 1987. He worked in numerous metalworking companies in Liechtenstein before founding his own company Friko Mechanik AG in 1998, and he has since been its owner and managing director.

He was a member of the Vaduz municipal council from 2003 to 2016 as a member of the Patriotic Union, when he resigned for professional reasons. He was a member of the Landtag of Liechtenstein from 2013 to 2021. During this time, he was a member of the audit committee from 2017 to 2021.

Konrad ran for mayor of Vaduz in 2019, but was defeated by Manfred Bischof. In July 2019, Konrad was convicted of violating official secrecy when during the campaign for mayor he revealed how Bischof and then incumbent mayor Ewald Ospelt voted regarding the purchase of the Engel building in October 2015. Though he appealed the conviction, it was ultimately upheld in 2021 and he was fined 15,600 CHF.

Konrad married Ilse Gassner, a hairdresser, on 7 June 2007 and they have one child together.
