= 2024 Vaduz mayoral by-election =

2024 Vaduz by-election
- 25 August 2024
- Turnout: 52.2%
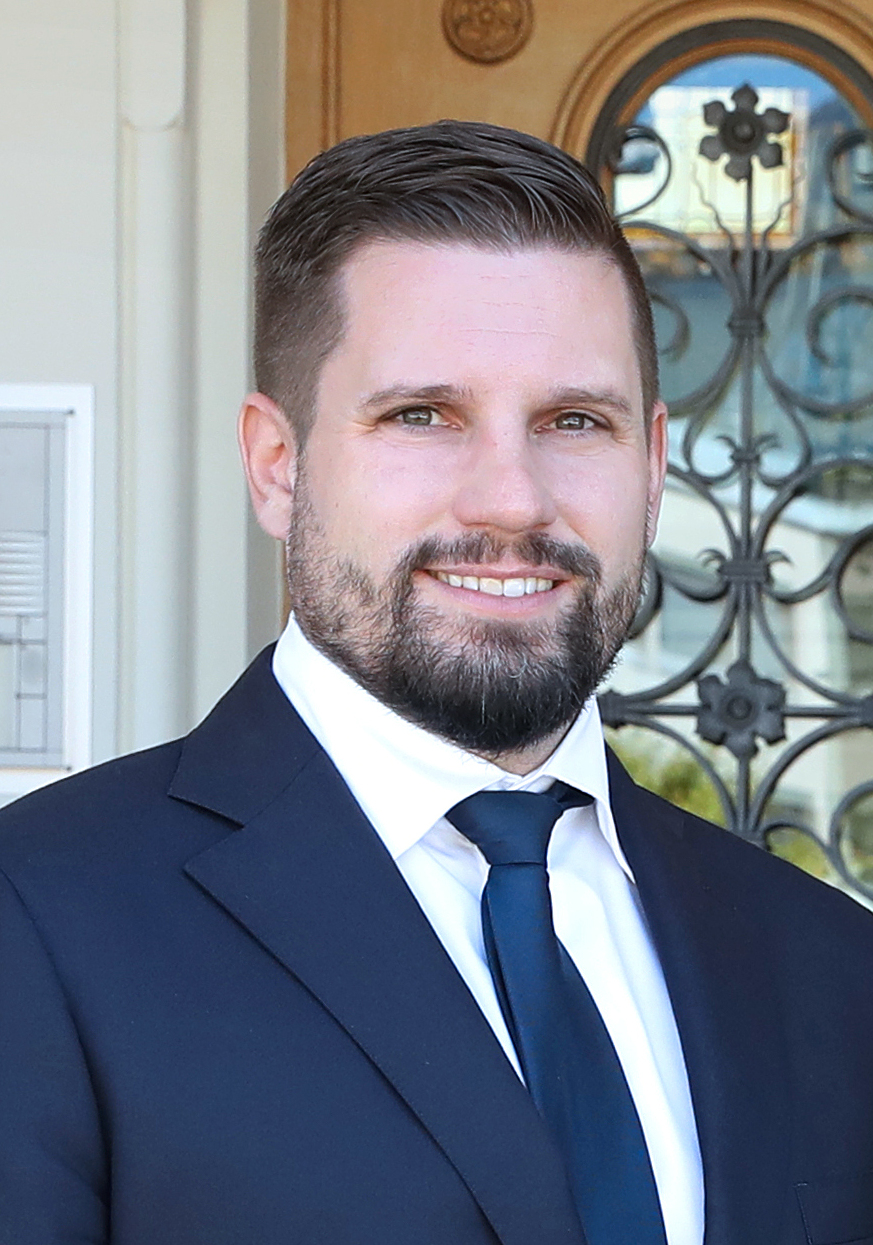
	First party
Leader	Florian Meier
Party	FBP
Popular vote	1397
Percentage	95%
Mayor before election
Florian Meier
FBP
Elected mayor
Florian Meier
FBP

A by-election was held in Vaduz on 25 August 2024 to elect the mayor of Vaduz following the resignation of incumbent mayor Petra Miescher. The result was a win for Florian Meier of the Progressive Citizens' Party (FBP), who was elected to the position unopposed.

== Background and campaign ==
Incumbent mayor of Vaduz, Petra Miescher of the Patriotic Union (VU), resigned on 24 May 2024 due to ongoing health issues. Her deputy Florian Meier, who had already been assuming her responsibilities while Miescher was on sick leave, assumed the position as acting mayor.

The Liechtenstein municipal law states that the responsibilities of mayor are taken over by the deputy mayor "in the event of incapacity". However, it does not have a succession provision in the event of the death, resignation, or permanent incapacitation of a mayor. As such, it was unclear on how the mayoral succession in Vaduz would be decided. Ultimately, the Liechtenstein government, at the request of the Vaduz municipal council, called for a by-election to be held on 25 August 2024 to elect a new mayor.

Meier was nominated as the FBP's candidate for mayor on 20 June. Neither party wanted a campaign period, thus the VU renounced a candidate on the 25th of the same month. Meier was expected to be elected to the position unopposed.

== Results ==
Meier was elected to the position unanimously, receiving 95% of the vote, and became the next major of Vaduz. Voter turnout was 52.2%. He was sworn on 18 September by prime minister Daniel Risch and deputy prime minister Sabine Monauni.

Candidate	Party	Votes	%
Florian Meier	Progressive Citizens' Party	1,397	100.00
Total		1,397	100.00
Source: Gemeinde Vaduz

== See also ==
- 1980 Vaduz mayoral by-election
