= Bettina Petzold-Mähr =

Liechtensteiner politician and former volleyball player

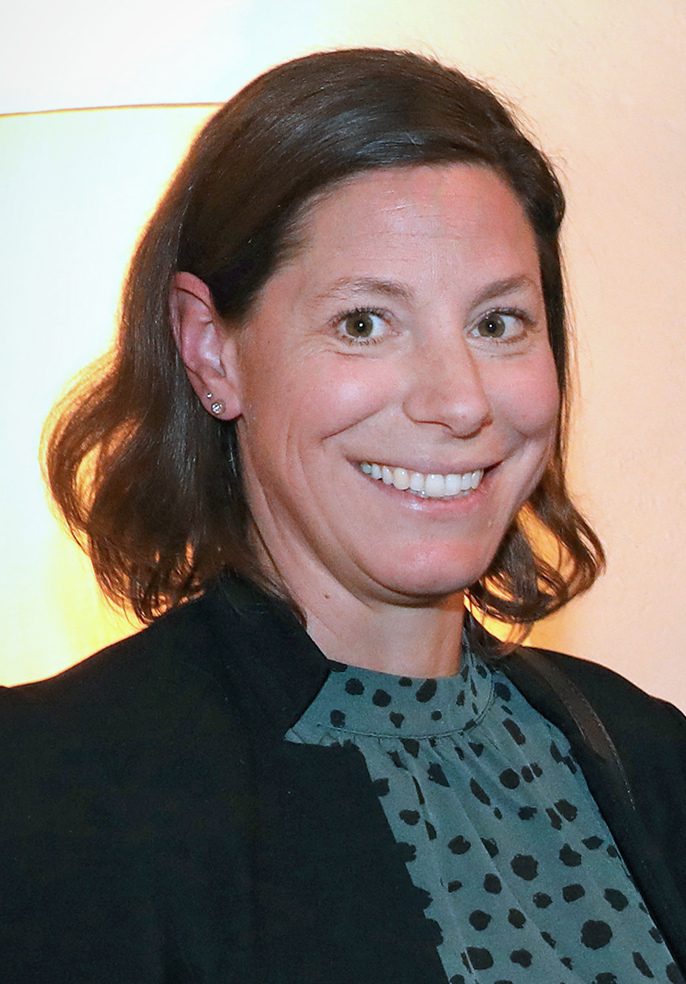
- Petzold-Mähr in 2023

Member of the Landtag of Liechtenstein
- Incumbent
- Assumed office 7 February 2021
- Constituency: Oberland

Personal details
- Born: 20 August 1982 (age 44) Vaduz, Liechtenstein
- Party: Progressive Citizens' Party
- Volleyball career
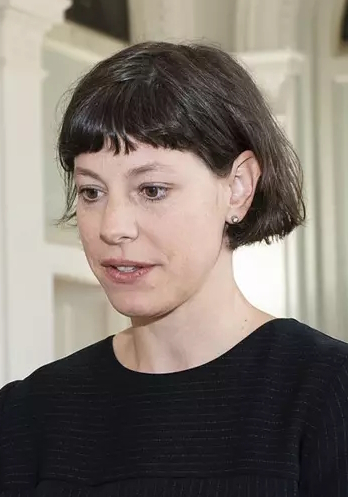

Beach volleyball information
Years	Teammate	Tours (points)
2009	Petra Walser	15

Career
Years	Teams
?	VBC Galina

National team
?	Liechtenstein

Bettina Petzold-Mähr (born 20 August 1982) is a former volleyball player and politician from Liechtenstein who has served in the Landtag of Liechtenstein since 2021.

== Biography ==
Bettina Petzold-Mähr was born on 20 August 1982 in Vaduz, the daughter of Andrea (née Beck) and Anton Mähr, and raised in Planken. She has a brother.

Petzold-Mähr played for the Liechtenstein women's national volleyball team and for the volleyball club VBC Galina. In May 2008, she played for the national team in a match they won against an all-star team from the similarly-named Lichtenstein, a town in the German state of Saxony. She and her partner Petra Walser participated in the 2009 Games of the Small States of Europe, where they almost won the bronze medal before losing both sets at the match to Luxembourg. The two later participated in the August 2009 European Volleyball Confederation Challenger and Satellite tournament in Vaduz, losing both of their matches.

In the 2019 Liechtenstein local elections, Petzold-Mähr was elected to the Planken communal council as the highest-ranked candidate overall (let alone for the FBP), receiving 148 votes. In the 2023 Liechtenstein local elections, she did not run for re-election to the council and instead ran for mayor of Planken, but lost to Patriotic Union incumbent Rainer Beck, receiving only 94 votes (41.8%). She has also served as vice-provost of Planken and as president of the school board.

In October 2020, Petzold-Mähr received the FBP's nomination for the 2021 Liechtenstein general election. She was elected to the Landtag as the sixth-highest-ranked FBP candidate for the Oberland constituency, receiving 3,223 votes. For the 2021-2025 term, she participates in the Landtag's EEA/Schengen and Foreign Affairs Commissions. On 1 September 2022, she held the floor during a Landtag debate on earthquake insurance when a 2.4 earthquake struck the nations' capital, forcing an evacuation of parliament.

Petzold-Mähr also works at the National Bank of Liechtenstein, having done so before being elected to the Landtag. She is married to Ralf Petzold and has two children.
