= Florian Meier =

Mayor of Vaduz since 2024

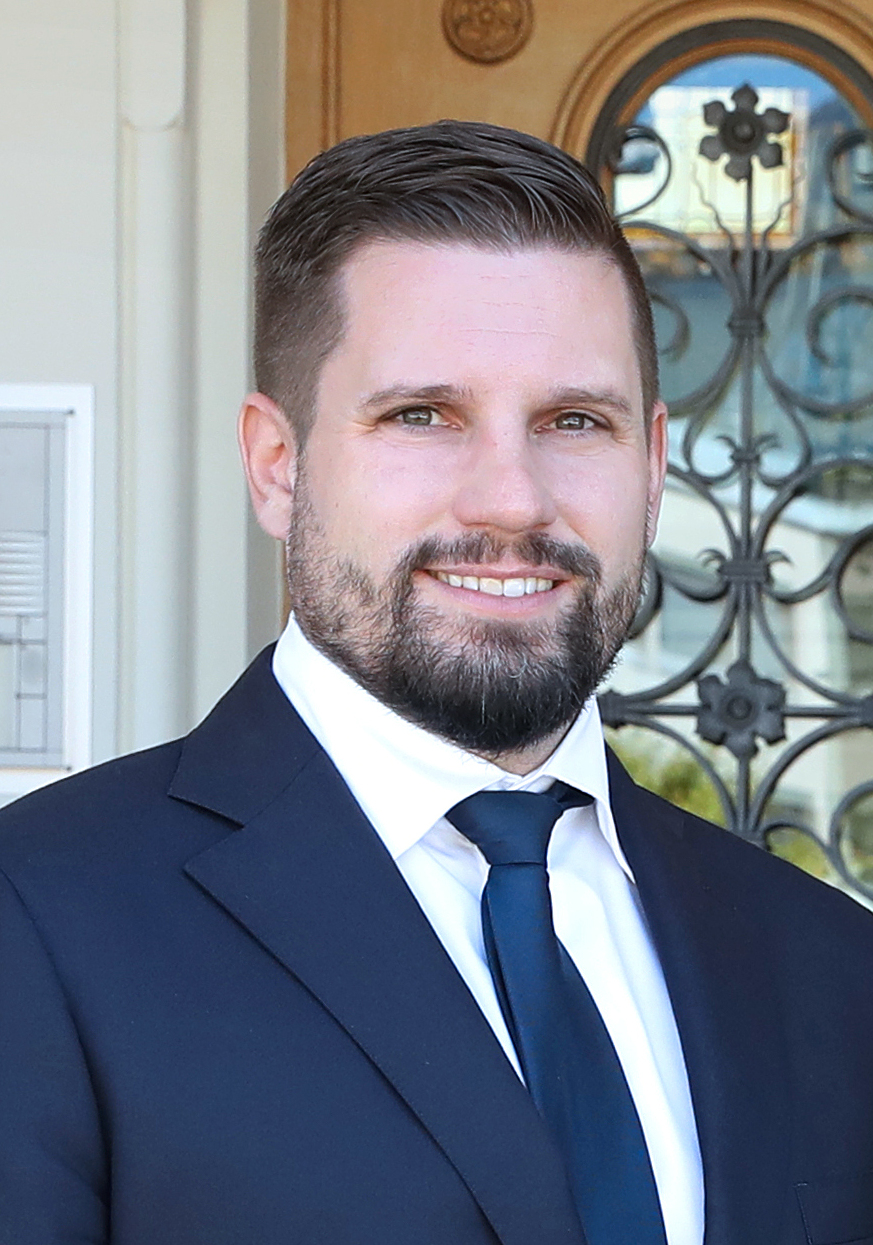
- Meier in 2024

Mayor of Vaduz
- Incumbent
- Assumed office 24 May 2024
- Deputy: Antje Moser
- Preceded by: Petra Miescher

Personal details
- Born: 24 November 1988 (age 36); Vaduz, Liechtenstein
- Political party: Progressive Citizens' Party
- Spouse: Mirjam Negele (m. 2010)
- Relations: Hilmar Ospelt (great-uncle)
- Children: 3

Florian Meier (born 14 November 1988) is a politician from Liechtenstein who has served as the mayor of Vaduz since 2024. He previously served as deputy mayor from 2023 to 2024.

== Life ==
From 2011 to 2024 Meier worked as a police officer in the Liechtenstein National Police. He was deputy mayor of Vaduz from 2023. In January 2024 he was relieved of duty as a police officer in order to step in as mayor for Petra Miescher who was absent on sick leave. Miescher resigned on 24 May 2024 due to ongoing health issues and Meier was placed as acting mayor.

He was elected to the position in his own right in the 2024 Vaduz mayoral by-election on 25 August 2024, where he was elected unanimously with no opposition. He is a member of the Progressive Citizens' Party. He was sworn on 18 September by prime minister Daniel Risch and deputy prime minister Sabine Monauni.

Meier married Mirjam Negele on 29 May 2010 and they have three children together.

== See also ==
- 2024 Vaduz mayoral by-election
