= Rainer Beck =

Mayor of Planken since 2007

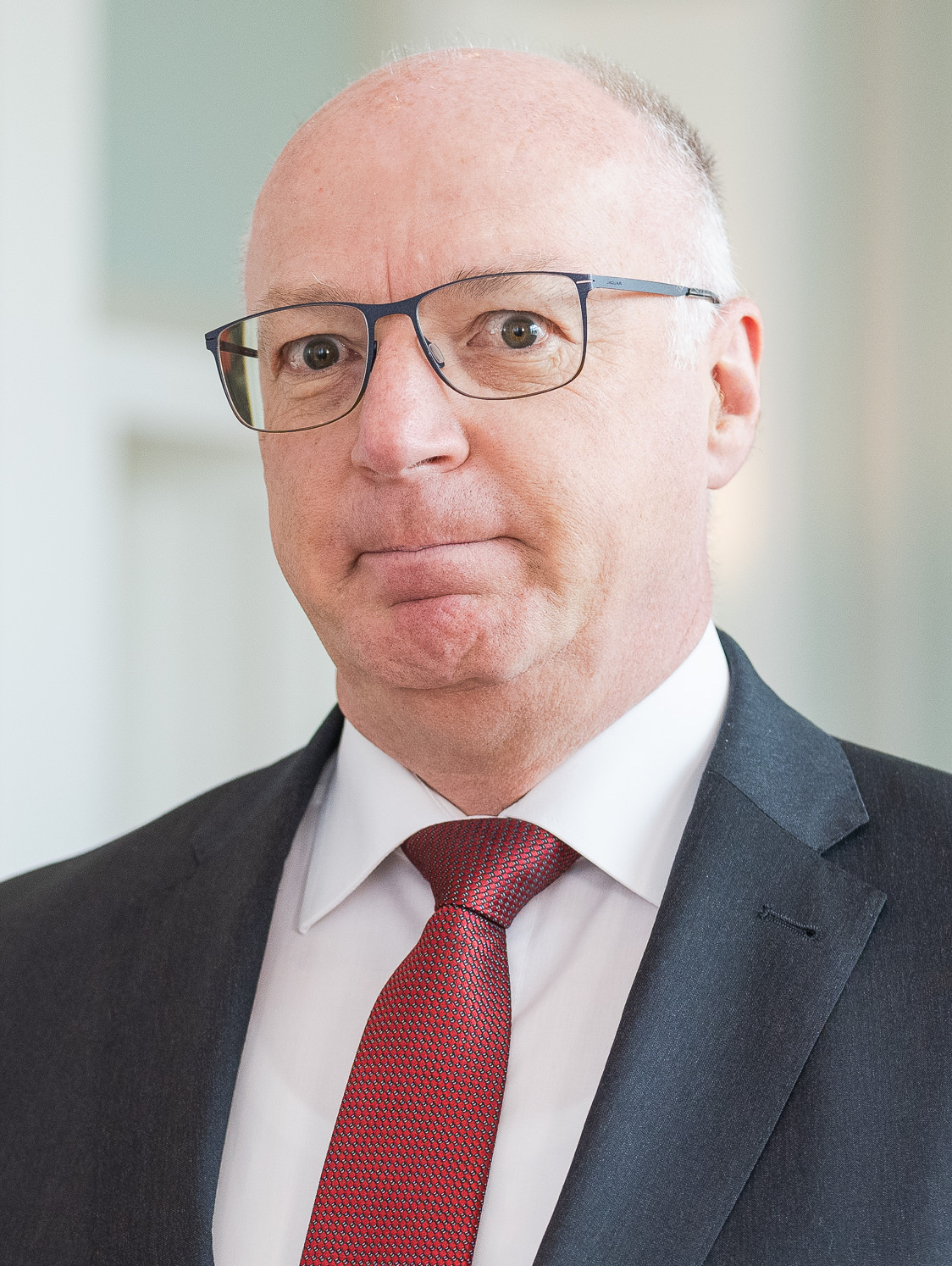
- Beck in 2023

Mayor of Planken
- Incumbent
- Assumed office February 2007
- Deputy: Josef Biedermann (2011–2019); Bettina Petzold-Mähr (2019–2023); Stefan Miescher (2023–)
- Preceded by: Gaston Jehle

Personal details
- Born: 31 August 1967 (age 58) Vaduz, Liechtenstein
- Party: Patriotic Union
- Spouse: Ursula Liechti (m. 2000)
- Children: 2

Rainer Beck (born 31 August 1967) is an accountant and politician from Liechtenstein who has served as the Mayor of Planken since 2007.

== Life ==
Beck was born on 31 August 1967 in Grabs as the son of Paul Beck and Margrith (née Ernst) as one of three children. He attended secondary school in the capital Vaduz before conducting a commercial apprenticeship at Hilti in Schaan. From there, he worked at the National Bank of Liechtenstein from 1986 to 1990 and then as the municipal treasurer of Planken from 1990 to 1995. He became a certified accountant in 1994.

From 1995 to 1996 he was an auditor at VP Bank and then head of financial accounting at Ivoclar in Schaan from 1996 to 2000. He was the head of the Liechtenstein state treasury from 2001 to 2007, being an employee until 2017.

Beck was a member of the Patriotic Union (VU) in Schaan from 1998 to 2005, and now in Planken since 2006. He was elected mayor of the municipality in 2007, defeating Petra Walter-Wenzel of the Progressive Citizens' Party (FBP). He was re-elected unopposed in 2011 and 2015. He faced his first electoral challenge as mayor in 2019 when he was challenged by his predecessor Gaston Jehle of the FBP; Beck defeated Jehle by four votes, the smallest margin of any municipality that year. He was re-elected to a fourth term in 2023, defeating deputy mayor Bettina Petzold-Mähr, though declaring his intention for it to be his last term.

During his time as mayor, a new inn started construction in Planken in 2025, which was narrowly accepted in a community vote in 2023. Beck was a deputy member of the Landtag of Liechtenstein from 2017 to 2021; he again served as a deputy member from March 2023 following the resignation of Philip Schädler, a position which he held until 2025.

Beck married Claudia Lampert on 31 August 2001 and they have three children together. He lives in Planken.
