= Maria Kaiser-Eberle =

Mayor of Ruggell from 2015 to 2023

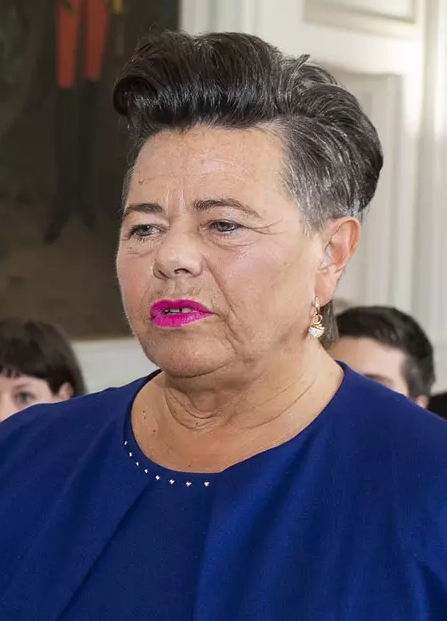
- Kaiser-Eberle in 2019

Mayor of Ruggell
- In office 1 May 2015 – 1 May 2023
- Deputy: Martin Büchel (2015–2019); Jürgen Hasler (2019–2023)
- Preceded by: Ernst Büchel
- Succeeded by: Christian Öhri

Personal details
- Born: Maria Eberle; 17 May 1959 (age 66) Eschen, Liechtenstein
- Party: Progressive Citizens' Party
- Spouse: Willi Kaiser (m. 1986)
- Relations: Johannes Kaiser (brother-in-law)
- Children: 3

Maria Kaiser-Eberle (née Eberle; born 17 May 1959) is a teacher and politician from Liechtenstein who served as mayor of Ruggell from 2015 to 2023.

== Life ==
Eberle was born on 17 May 1959 in Eschen as the daughter of Eugen Eberle and Paulina (née Oehry). She attended primary school in Ruggell before attending the St. Elisabeth Monastery in Schaan. She trained as a kindergarten teacher in Feldkirch from 1970 to 1974, and also received a diploma as a music teacher in 1979. She worked as a kindergarten teacher in Mauren from 1979 to 1988, and then as a music teacher at the Liechtenstein music school from 1979 to 1988. From 1988 to 2015, she was kindergarten and primary school inspector for the Liechtenstein school authority.

Kaiser-Eberle served as a member of the Ruggell municipal council from 2004 to 2011 as a member of the Progressive Citizens' Party, and also the deputy mayor of the municipality from 2007 to 2011. She was elected as mayor of Ruggell in 2015, defeating Mario Wohlwend. Kaiser-Eberle is the first female mayor of Ruggell, and second female Liechtenstein mayor overall, behind Maria Marxer in 1991. She held this position until 2023, when she declined to seek re-election.

She married Willi Kaiser, a teacher and brother of Johannes Kaiser, on 12 July 1986; they have three children. She was a resident of Mauren from 1986 to 2020, when the Ruggell municipal council voted to reinstate her as a citizen of Ruggell.

== Honours ==
- Liechtenstein: Knight's Cross of the Order of Merit of the Principality of Liechtenstein
