= Karlheinz Ospelt =

Liechtenstein trustee and politician (born 1961)

Member of the Landtag of Liechtenstein for Oberland
- In office 7 February 1993 – 11 February 2001

Mayor of Vaduz
- In office February 1995 – February 2007
- Deputy: Norman Marxer (1995–1999); Ewald Ospelt (1999–2003); Mortiz Gassner (2003–2007)
- Preceded by: Arthur Konrad
- Succeeded by: Ewald Ospelt

Personal details
- Born: 11 September 1961 (age 64) Grabs, Switzerland
- Party: Patriotic Union
- Spouse: Daniela Ospelt

Karlheinz Ospelt (born 11 September 1961) is a trustee and politician from Liechtenstein who served in the Landtag of Liechtenstein from 1993 to 2001. A member of the Patriotic Union (VU), he also served as the Mayor of Vaduz from 1995 to 2007.

== Life ==
Ospelt was born on 11 September 1961 in Chur as the son of Karl Ospelt and Elisabeth (née Schreiber) as one of four children. He studied economics in St. Gallen, receiving a licentiate in 1985. From 1987 to 1992 he was a partner and member of the board of directors at a trust firm, and since then he has worked as an independent trustee. He was a judge at the Administrative Complaints Authority (VBI) from 1986 to 1993.

He was a member of the Landtag of Liechtenstein from 1993 to 2001 as a member of the Patriotic Union (VU). During this time, he was also a member of the Landtag's finance committee and the chairman of the audit committee. He was also elected the mayor of Vaduz in 1995, being the first member of the Patriotic Union elected to the position. During his time as mayor, the Haberfeld nature park was redeveloped from 2003 to 2005. He did not seek re-election as mayor in 2007 and was succeeded by Ewald Ospelt.

Ospelt was considered as a candidate for Prime Minister of Liechtenstein in 2013, but he declined to seek election for the position, stating that he had "consciously withdrawn from active politics".

He was president of the board of trustees of the Liechtenstein Old Age and Sickness Assistance Foundation from 1997 to 2007. From 2007 he was a member of the board of directors at Neue Bank in Vaduz, and its president from 2010 to 2020, when he resigned. Ospelt opposed the closing of the Rhine dam in Vaduz to motorized vehicles in April 2019, and was the spokesperson for a popular initiative to have the dam expanded, which was accepted by voters in a local referendum in October 2021.

Ospelt was the vice president of the board of directors at LIEmobil until 2020. In May 2019, while the company's 2018 annual report was being discussed in the Landtag, Thomas Lageder called for Ospelt's resignation, stating that he was "not suitable" for the position due to an alleged conflict of interest between his role as vice president of the board of directors of LIEmobil and his support of private motorized transport. In response, Ospelt called for Lageder's resignation from the Landtag, accusing him of being poorly informed and incompetent.

He is married to Daniela Ospelt, a member of the Vaduz municipal council. She unsuccessfully ran for a seat in the Landtag in the 2025 Liechtenstein general election.

== Honours ==
- Liechtenstein: Knight's Cross of the Order of Merit of the Principality of Liechtenstein (2007)
