= Petra Miescher =

Mayor of Vaduz from 2023 to 2024

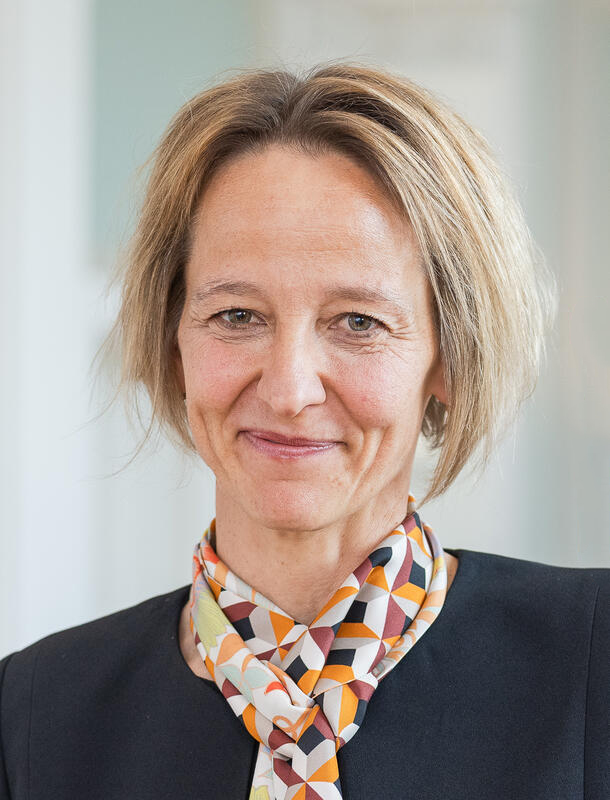
- Miescher in 2023

Mayor of Vaduz
- In office 1 May 2023 – 24 May 2024
- Deputy: Florian Meier
- Preceded by: Manfred Bischof
- Succeeded by: Florian Meier

Personal details
- Born: 29 December 1971 (age 53) Altstätten, Switzerland
- Political party: Patriotic Union
- Spouse: Daniel Miescher (m. 1995)
- Children: 3

Petra Miescher (born 29 December 1971) is a Swiss–Liechtensteiner nurse and politician who served as mayor of Vaduz from 2023 to 2024.

== Life ==
She attended high school in Vaduz, and from 1990 to 1993 she trained as a nurse at the St. Gallen children's hospital. From 1993 to 2023 she worked as a nurse in the same hospital, and also in Sydney from 2009 to 2011. From 2013 to 2018 she was a member of the Liechtenstein Crisis Intervention Team and also a board member of the Safe Liechtenstein Association from 2020 to 2023.

From 2019 to 2023 she was a municipal councillor in Vaduz and was elected mayor of the municipality following the 2023 Liechtenstein local elections as a member of the Patriotic Union. She resigned as mayor on 24 May 2024 due to ongoing health issues. Her role was filled by her deputy Florian Meier, until he was elected mayor in his own right on 25 August 2024.

Miescher married teacher Daniel Miescher on 1 September 1995 and they have three children together.
