= List of mayors of Vaduz =

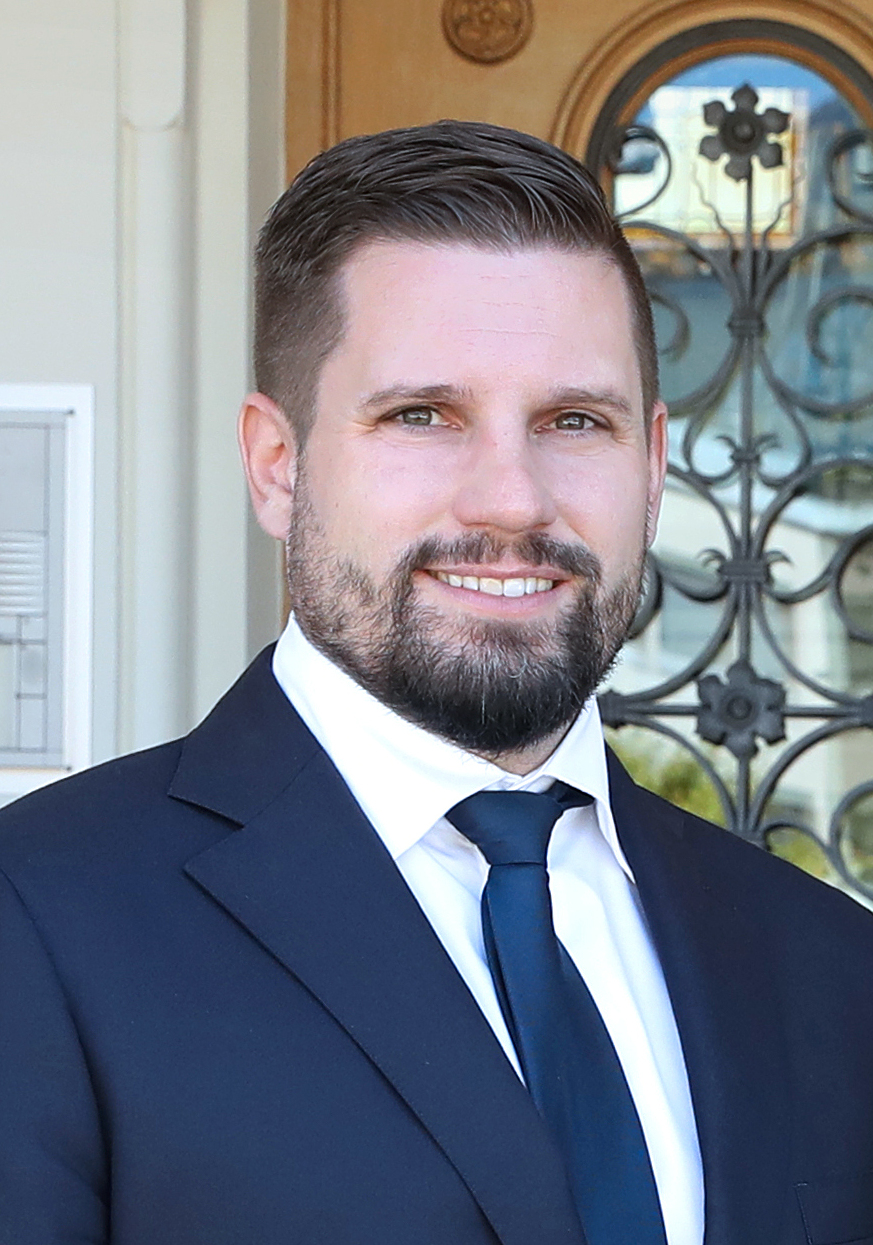
Florian Meier, the incumbent mayor of Vaduz

The mayor of Vaduz is the head of the Vaduz municipal government. The role has existed since the introduction of the Liechtenstein municipal law of 1864.

The incumbent mayor is Florian Meier, elected in the 2024 Vaduz mayoral by-election.

== List of mayors (1864–present) ==
List of mayors (1864–present)
No. (Note: People are numbered according to periods served by the same person. For example, Adolf Real served as mayor in three non-consecutive terms, but is counted only once.)	Image	Name (Birth–Death)	Term	Party	Ref(s)
1		Alois Rheinberger (1836–1901)	1864–1870	—	
2		Josef Amann (1823–1891)	1870–1873	—	
3		Felix Real (1822–1876)	1873–1876	—	
(1)		Alois Rheinberger (1836–1901)	1876–1879	—	
(2)		Josef Amann (1823–1891)	1879–1885	—	
4		Meinrad Ospelt (1844–1934)	1885–1888	—	
(1)		Alois Rheinberger (1836–1901)	1888–1894	—	
5		Reinold Amann (1849–1936)	1894–1897	—	
6		Adolf Real (1858–1916)	1897–1900	—	
7		Alois Seeger (1868–1931)	1900–1903	—	
(6)		Adolf Real (1858–1916)	1903–1909	—	
8		Franz Wachter (1850–1923)	1909–1912	—	
(6)		Adolf Real (1858–1916)	1912–1916	—	
7		Gustav Ospelt (1877–1934)	1916–1921	FBP	
8		Josef Gassner (1873–1943)	1921–1927	FBP	
9		Bernhard Risch (1879–1962)	1927–1930	FBP	
10		Ludwig Ospelt (1882–1949)	1930–1933	FBP	
(9)		Bernhard Risch (1879–1962)	1933–1936	FBP	
(10)		Ludwig Ospelt (1882–1949)	1936–1942	FBP	
11		David Strub (1897–1985)	1942–1966	FBP	
12		Meinrad Ospelt (1906–1983)	1966–1972	FBP	
13		Hilmar Ospelt (1929–2020)	1972–1980	FBP	
14		Arthur Konrad (1934–2025)	1980–1995	FBP	
15		Karlheinz Ospelt (born 1961)	1995–2007	VU	
16		Ewald Ospelt (born 1960)	2007–2019	FBP	
17		Manfred Bischof (born 1973)	2019–2023	FBP	
18		Petra Miescher (born 1971)	2023–2024	VU	
19		Florian Meier (born 1988)	2024–	FBP	

== See also ==
- Vaduz
- 2023 Vaduz elections
