= Ewald Ospelt =

Mayor of Vaduz from 2007 to 2019

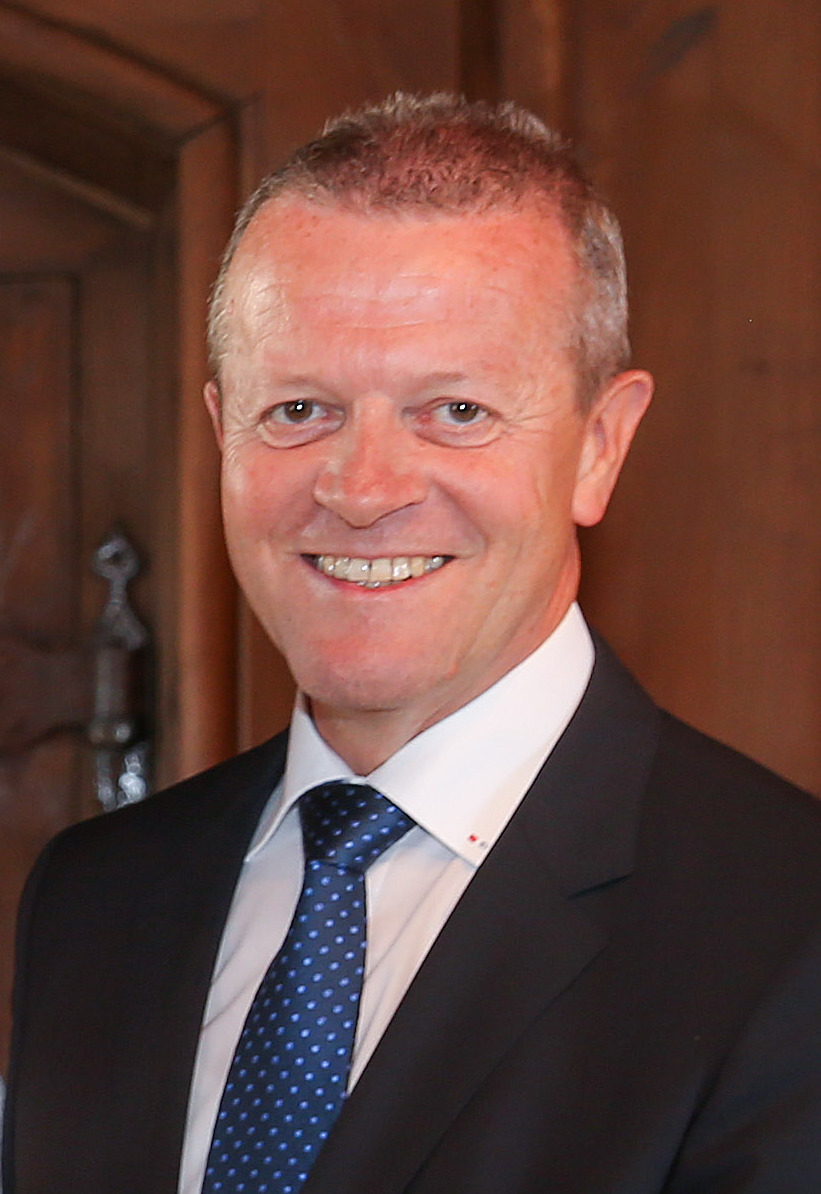
- Ospelt in 2017

Mayor of Vaduz
- In office 2007 – 1 May 2019
- Deputy: Patrick Wille
- Preceded by: Karlheinz Ospelt
- Succeeded by: Manfred Bischof

Personal details
- Born: 21 May 1960 (age 66) Grabs, Switzerland
- Party: Progressive Citizens' Party
- Spouse(s): Jutta Frommelt (m. 1986, divorced) Bettina Kindle (m. 2013)
- Relations: Alois Ospelt (brother)
- Children: 2

Ewald Ospelt (born 21 May 1960) is a politician from Liechtenstein who served as mayor of Vaduz from 2007 to 2019.

== Life ==
Ospelt was born in Grabs, Switzerland. He attended secondary school in Vaduz and from 1976 to 1980 he conducted an apprenticeship as an electrician in Schaan. He won a bronze medal at the electrical WorldSkills in Atlanta in 1981, and became a certified electrical inspector in 1985. From 2001 to 2007 he was head of customer services at the Liechtensteinische Kraftwerke.

From 1995 to 1999 Ospelt was a member of the Vaduz municipal council. From 1999 to 2003 he was deputy mayor of Vaduz, and then mayor from 2007 to 2019. He did not seek re-election in 2019 and was succeeded by Manfred Bischof.

In 2019, Ospelt co-founded Zeitpolster, a retirement provision charity, and he has been its president since.

Ospelt married Jutta Frommelt on 10 May 1986 and they had two children together. He then went on to marry Bettina Kindle on 26 July 2013. His brother Alois Ospelt served as a government councillor from 2001 to 2005.

== Honours ==
- Austria: Grand Decoration of Honour in Gold for Services to the Republic of Austria (2016)
- Liechtenstein: Knight's Cross of the Order of Merit of the Principality of Liechtenstein (2019)
