= Manfred Bischof =

Mayor of Vaduz from 2019 to 2023

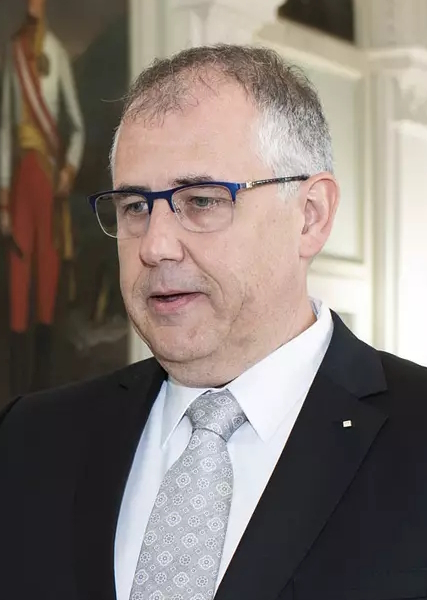
- Bischof in 2019

Mayor of Vaduz
- In office 1 May 2019 – 1 May 2023
- Deputy: Antje Moser
- Preceded by: Ewald Ospelt
- Succeeded by: Petra Miescher

Personal details
- Born: 8 May 1973 (age 52) Grabs, Switzerland
- Party: Progressive Citizens' Party
- Spouse(s): Regula Feurer (m. 1995, divorced) Sandra Mätzler (m. 2013)
- Children: 1

Manfred Bischof (born 8 May 1973) is an engineer and politician from Liechtenstein who served as the mayor of Vaduz from 2019 to 2023.

== Life ==
Bischof was born in Grabs, Switzerland. He attended school in Schaan from 1980 to 1985, and then secondary school in Vaduz. From 1993, he studied electronics and control technology at Eastern Switzerland University of Applied Sciences, where he graduated with an engineer diploma in 1996.

From 1997 to 2009 he worked at Hilti in Schaan. From 2009 to 2013 he worked at the noise and non-ionizing radiation protection at the Liechtenstein office for the environment, and from 2013 to 2019 head of the central services department and deputy head of the office for construction and infrastructure.

From 2013 to 2019 Bischof was a member of the Vaduz municipal council. He was elected as Mayor of Vaduz in 2019, defeating Frank Konrad of the Patriotic Union. He served in this position until 2023, when he lost re-election to Petra Miescher. He unsuccessfully ran for a seat in the Landtag of Liechtenstein in the 2025 Liechtenstein general election.

Bischof married Regula Feurer on 7 November 1997 and they had one child together, but they got divorced at an unspecified time. He then went on to marry Sandra Mätzler on 22 May 2013.

== Honours ==
- Liechtenstein: Knight's Cross of the Order of Merit of the Principality of Liechtenstein (2023)
