= Free List (Liechtenstein) =

Free List Freie Liste
- Abbreviation: FL
- Executive board: Daniel Walser, Isabelle von Salis, Manuela Haldner-Schierscher, Tobias Gassner, Valentin Ritter
- Founded: Autumn 1985
- Headquarters: Fürst-Franz-Josef-Strasse 5; 9490 Vaduz
- Youth wing: Young List
- Ideology: Social democracy Green politics Secularism; Multiculturalism; Constitutional monarchism
- Political position: Centre-left to left-wing
- Colours: Green
- Landtag: 2 / 25
- Mayors: 0 / 11
- Municipal Councils: 5 / 104

Website
- www.freieliste.li

The Free List (German: Freie Liste, FL) is a centre-left to left-wing political party in Liechtenstein. As of 2025, it has two seats in the Landtag of Liechtenstein and is represented in five of the eleven local councils. It was founded in 1985 and describes itself as social-democratic and green.

== History ==
The Free List ran for the first time in the 1986 state elections. In this election, and also in the 1989 election, it was unable to overcome the threshold clause.

In 1993, the Free List overcame the 8% electoral threshold for the first time with over 10% in the state elections and was also able to consolidate in the early elections in the same year with 8.5%, although this remained its worst result since then. Having increased to over 11% in 1997 and falling again somewhat in 2001, FL reached a record 13.0% of the votes in the 2005 election and thus won three out of a total of 25 mandates. In the 2009 elections, it fell to 8.9% and was only able to win one seat. In the 2013 election, its share rose again to over 11%, which in turn brought the party three mandates. In the state elections on 5 February 2017, the party gained 1.5%, but kept the same number of seats.

In the 2021 state election, the Free List gained 12.9%, an increase of 0.3%, but the number of seats held by the party remained the same.

== Policies ==
The central themes of the Free List are sexual equality, social justice, solidarity, environmental protection, good public transport services, and the integration of foreigners. It advocates the introduction of a representative monarchy in the Principality, limiting the veto powers of the monarchs. Secularist, it also criticizes the relation between the state and the Catholic Church in Liechtenstein, as well as the Archdiocese of Vaduz and the Archbishop Wolfgang Haas for their socially conservative attitude.

== Youth wing ==
The Young List (German: Junge Liste, JL) was founded in 2019 as a young party associated with the Free List. In September 2020, the youth organization presented its goals for the first time at the General Assembly of the Free List.

In October 2020, Young List started collecting signatures for a petition with the aim of lowering the voting age in Liechtenstein to 16. In May 2021, JL addressed a corresponding petition to the state parliament, which referred it to the government.

In September 2021, the Young List was constituted as a separate association.

At the general assembly in August 2022, the members Daniel Lochner (from Triesen) and Samuel Schurte (from Balzers) decided to stand as mayoral candidates in the 2023 municipal elections.

According to its own statements, the Young List has around 60 members (as of 2022).

== Electoral history ==
=== Landtag elections ===
Election	Leader		Votes	%	Seats	+/–	Rank	Status
1986			6,582	7.06	0 / 15	New	▲3rd	No seats
1989			12,090	7.56	0 / 25	Steady	3rd	No seats
Feb 1993			16,724	10.38	2 / 25	▲2	3rd	Opposition
Oct 1993			13,447	8.54	1 / 25	▼1	3rd	Opposition
1997			19,455	11.57	2 / 25	▲1	3rd	Opposition
2001	Christel Hilti		16,184	8.76	1 / 25	▼1	3rd	Opposition
2005	Pepo Frick		25,273	13.03	3 / 25	▲2	3rd	Opposition
2009	Wolfgang Marxer		17,835	8.92	1 / 25	▼2	3rd	Opposition
2013	Pepo Frick	Derya Kesci	21,604	11.13	3 / 25	▲2	▼4th	Opposition
2017	Pepo Frick	Derya Kesci	24,595	12.62	3 / 25	Steady	4th	Opposition
2021	Pepo Frick	Conny Büchel Brühwiler	25,943	12.87	3 / 25	Steady	▲3rd	Opposition
2025	Manuela Haldner-Schierscher		22,549	10.87	2 / 25	▼1	▼4th	Opposition
