= List of universities in Switzerland =

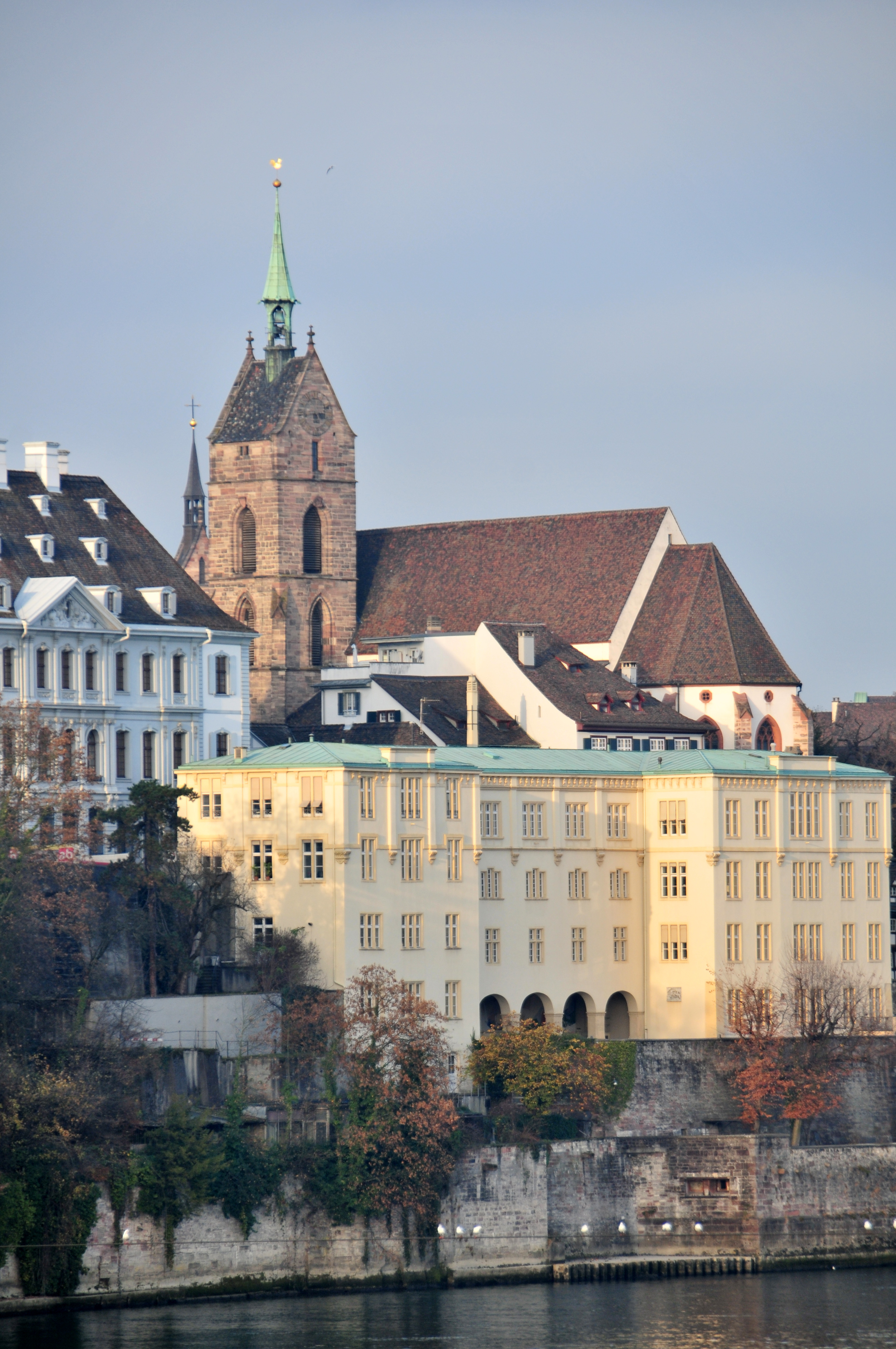
The University of Basel is the oldest institution of higher learning in Switzerland.

This list of universities in Switzerland lists all public and private higher education institutions accredited and coordinated according to the Federal Act on Funding and Coordination of the Swiss Higher Education Sector (short: Federal Higher Education Act, HEdA).

This includes all 12 publicly funded Swiss universities (10 cantonal universities and 2 federal institutes of technology) and a number of public and private Swiss Universities of Applied Sciences and other education institutions as higher education institutions. The Swiss University Conference and its accreditation body the CRUS-OAQ is responsible for their recognition; an accreditation also defines the right to call itself accordingly.

== Universities ==
Locations of the Universities of Switzerland

Institution	Abbreviation	Location	Founded	Language	Type	Enrollment (2024–25)
University of Basel	UNIBAS	Basel	1460	German / English	Public (cantonal)	13,325
University of Bern	UNIBE	Bern	1834	German / English	Public (cantonal)	19,741
University of Fribourg	UNIFR	Fribourg	1889	French / German	Public (cantonal)	9,872
University of Geneva	UNIGE	Geneva	1559	French / English	Public (cantonal)	18,241
University of Neuchâtel	UNINE	Neuchâtel	1838	French / English	Public (cantonal)	4,514
University of Lausanne	UNIL	Lausanne	1537	French / English	Public (cantonal)	17,197
University of Lucerne	UNILU	Lucerne	2000	German / English	Public (cantonal)	4,131
Università della Svizzera Italiana	USI	Lugano	1995	Italian / English	Public (cantonal)	4,749
University of St. Gallen	HSG	St. Gallen	1898	German / English	Public (cantonal)	9,992
University of Zurich	UZH	Zürich	1833	German / English	Public (cantonal)	28,664
Swiss Federal Institute of Technology Lausanne	EPFL	Lausanne	1853	French / English	Public (federal)	14,072
Swiss Federal Institute of Technology Zurich	ETH / ETHZ	Zürich	1855	German / English	Public (federal)	26,198

== Universities of Applied Sciences ==
There are ten public and one private Universities of Applied Sciences (or German: Fachhochschule (FH), French: Haute école specialisée (HES), and Italian: scuola universitaria professionale (SUP)) in Switzerland.

Public

- Bern University of Applied Sciences, BFH (German: Berner Fachhochschule), German-speaking
- Fachhochschule Graubünden, FHGR
- University of Applied Sciences Northwestern Switzerland, FHNW (German: Fachhochschule Nordwestschweiz), German-speaking and English-speaking
- University of Applied Sciences of Eastern Switzerland, OST (German: OST – Ostschweizer Fachhochschule), German-speaking
- University of Applied Sciences and Arts of Western Switzerland, HES-SO (French: Haute école spécialisée de Suisse occidentale), French- and German-speaking in Fribourg only
- Lucerne University of Applied Sciences and Arts, HSLU (German: Hochschule Luzern), German-speaking
- University of Applied Sciences and Arts of Southern Switzerland, SUPSI (Italian: Scuola Universitaria Professionale della Svizzera Italiana), Italian-speaking
- Zurich University of Applied Sciences, ZHAW (German: Zürcher Hochschule für Angewandte Wissenschaften)
- Zurich University of the Arts ZHdK (German: Zürcher Hochschule der Künste)

Private

- Kalaidos University of Applied Sciences (German: Kaleidos Fachhochschule)

== Higher education institutions of art and music ==
- Accademia Teatro Dimitri, Verscio (part of the SUPSI)
- Conservatorio della Svizzera italiana, CSI, Lugano (part of the SUPSI)
- École cantonale d'art de Lausanne (ÉCAL), Lausanne (part of the HES-SO)
- Dipartimento ambiente costruzioni e design, Canobbio (part of the SUPSI)
- HES-SO Valais-Wallis – Edhéa Ecole de design et haute école d'art, Sierre (part of the HES-SO)
- Haute école d'art et de design Genève, HEAD, Geneva (part of the HES-SO)
- Haute école de musique de Genève, HEM, Neuchâtel (part of the HES-SO)
- Haute Ecole de Musique de Lausanne, HEMU, Lausanne, Fribourg, Sion (part of the HES-SO)
- HE-Arc Conservation-restauration, Lausanne (part of the HES-SO)
- Hochschule der Künste, Bern, HKB (part of the BFH)
- Hochschule für Gestaltung und Kunst FHNW (part of the FHNW)
- Hochschule für Musik FHNW (part of the FHNW)
- Hochschule Luzern – Departement Design & Kunst (part of the HSLU)
- Hochschule Luzern – Departement Musik (part of the HSLU)
- La Manufacture – Haute école des arts de la scène, Lausanne (part of the HES-SO)
- Zürcher Hochschule der Künste ZHdK
- Kalaidos Musikhochschule (part of the Kalaidos University of Applied Sciences)

== Universities of teacher education ==
According to diploma recognition by the EDK / CDIP:

- Haute école pédagogique des cantons de Berne, du Jura et de Neuchâtel, HEP-BEJUNE
- Haute école pédagogique du canton de Vaud, HEP Vaud
- Pädagogische Hochschule Wallis | Haute école pédagogique du Valais, HEP-VS | PH-VS
- Haute école pédagogique Fribourg | Pädagogische Hochschule Freiburg, HEP | PH FR
- Hochschulinstitut IVP NMS
- Interkantonale Hochschule für Heilpädagogik Zürich, HfH
- Pädagogische Hochschule Graubünden | Alta scuola pedagogica dei Grigioni | Scola auta da pedagogia dal Grischun, PHGR
- Pädagogische Hochschule Bern, PHBern
- Pädagogische Hochschule Luzern, PH Luzern
- Pädagogische Hochschule Nordwestschweiz, PH FHNW
- Pädagogische Hochschule St. Gallen, PHSG
- Pädagogische Hochschule Schaffhausen, PHSH
- Pädagogische Hochschule Schwyz, PHSZ
- Pädagogische Hochschule Thurgau, PHTG
- Pädagogische Hochschule Zürich, PH Zürich
- Pädagogische Hochschule Zug, PH Zug
- Schweizer Hochschule für Logopädie Rorschach, SHLR
- SUPSI – Dipartimento formazione e apprendimento (Ticino), SUPSI-DFA
- Swiss Federal University for Vocational Education and Training, SFUVET

== Other institutions of the higher education sector ==
- Cesar Ritz Colleges (university of applied sciences institute)
- Franklin University Switzerland, FUS (university institute)
- Graduate Institute of International and Development Studies of Geneva, IHEID (university institute)
- Hochschule für Wirtschaft Zürich, HWZ (university of applied sciences institute)
- Hochschulinstitut Schaffhausen, HSSH (university institute)
- International Institute for Management Development, IMD (university institute)
- Les Roches International School of Hotel Management (university of applied sciences institute)
- Schweizerisches universitäres Institut für traditionelle chinesische Medizin, SWISS TCM UNI (university institute)
- Staatsunabhängige Theologische Hochschule Basel, STH Basel (university institute)
- Stiftung Universitäre Fernstudien Schweiz, Brig (university institute)
- Swiss Business School, SBS (university of applied sciences institute)
- Swiss Federal Institute of Sport Magglingen, SFISM
- Swiss UMEF (university of applied sciences institute)
- Theologische Hochschule Chur (university institute)
- European Institute of Management and Technology (EIMT)
- IPEM Technological University
- Educrest Institute of Early Childhood Education

== International rankings for the public universities ==
=== ARWU ===
In relation to its population size, Switzerland is the country with the highest number of universities among the 100 best of the Academic Ranking of World Universities (2014–2015).

=== Switzerland Top Universities in 2020/21 ===
A list of Switzerland top universities as per three major ranking platforms ARWU (Academic Ranking of World Universities), THE (Times Higher Education) and the QS (Quacquarelli Symonds).

World rankings
University	Location	ARWU (2020)	THE (2020)	QS (2021)
ETH Zurich – Swiss Federal Institute of Technology	Zürich	20	14	6
EPFL (Ecole Polytechnique Fédérale de Lausanne)	Lausanne	83	43	14
University of Zurich	Zürich	56	73	69
University of Basel	Basel	88	92	149
University of Geneva	Geneva	59	149	106
University of Lausanne	Lausanne	101–150	191	169
University of Bern	Bern	101–150	109	114
University of Fribourg	Fribourg	401–500	351–400	601–650
Università della Svizzera Italiana	Lugano	701–800	251–300	273
University of St. Gallen (HSG)	St.Gallen	–	401–500	428
University of Neuchâtel	Neuchâtel	901–1000	401–500	–

== See also ==
- List of largest universities by enrollment in Switzerland
- Education in Switzerland
- Science and technology in Switzerland
- List of colleges and universities by country
- List of colleges and universities
- List of Hospitality Management Schools in Switzerland
