= Swissuniversities =

Umbrella organization of universities and colleges in Switzerland

- Type: Association of universities and colleges
- Headquarters: Bern, Switzerland
- Location: Switzerland
- Members: 36 Swiss universities and colleges
- Official language: English, French, German, Italian
- President: Luciana Vaccaro
- Secretary General: Martina Weiss
- Website: www.swissuniversities.ch

Swissuniversities (stylised as swᴉssunᴉversᴉtᴉes) is the umbrella organization of universities and colleges in Switzerland.

Swissuniversities has 38 member institutions, including the two federal institutes of technology, ten cantonal universities, ten (state-run and private) universities of applied sciences, and sixteen universities of teacher education.

== History ==
The Higher Education Act of 2011 called for the creation of a unified organization for Swiss higher education institutions. This led to the merger of the previous organizations, that is CRUS (universities), KFH (universities of applied sciences), and COHEP (universities of teacher education). Swissuniversities was founded in 2012 and officially began operations on January 1, 2015 when the Higher Education Act went into effect.

== Organization ==
Swissuniversities has the following governing bodies:

- Plenary Assembly
- Three chambers representing universities, universities of applied sciences, and universities of teacher education.
- Executive Board
- Delegations and delegates
- Networks and representatives
- Secretary General's Office

== Responsibilities ==
The main purpose of Swissuniversities is to deepen and promote cooperation and a common voice among higher education institutions in Switzerland. It acts as a common body for every type of Swiss universities and colleges representing their interests at national and international level. Swissuniversities can take on mandates from the federal government as well as lead programs and projects.

Swissuniversities has the following key responsibilities:

- providing input to the Swiss Conference of Higher Education and making proposals on behalf of higher education institutions;
- representing the interests of Swiss universities and colleges at national and international levels;
- taking on mandates from the federal government and leading programs and projects (such as digitalization, open access and data management)
- operating the Swiss ENIC office for recognition of domestic and foreign academic credentials;
- handling applications and admissions for medical studies in Switzerland;
- managing, on behalf of the Swiss Confederation, foreign government grants for a study period abroad offered to Swiss students and/or researchers by approximately 30 countries.

Swissuniversities works closely with the Swiss Conference of Higher Education, the main political body for higher education in Switzerland.

== Member Institutions ==
Swissuniversities has the following members:

=== Universities of Teacher Education ===
- Swiss Federal University for Vocational Education and Training (EHB or SFUVET)
- Pädagogisches Hochschulinstitut NMS Bern (PH NMS Bern)
- University of Teacher Education Berne-Jura-Neuchâtel BEJUNE
- University of Teacher Education Bern (PHBern)
- University of Teacher Education Fribourg (HEP / PH FR)
- University of Teacher Education Valais (HEP-VS / PH-VS)
- University of Teacher Education State of (Vaud HEP Vaud)
- University of Teacher Education Grisons (PHGR)
- University of Teacher Education Lucerne (PH Luzern)
- University of Teacher Education Schaffhausen (PHSH)
- University of Teacher Education Schwyz (PHSZ)
- University of Teacher Education St. Gallen (PHSG)
- University of Teacher Education Thurgau (PHTG)
- University of Teacher Education Zug (PH Zug)
- University of Teacher Education Zurich (PH Zurich)
- Inter-Canton School for Special Education (HfH)

=== Universities of Applied Sciences ===
- University of Applied Sciences of Eastern Switzerland (OST)
- Lucerne University of Applied Sciences and Arts (HSLU)
- Zurich University of Applied Sciences (ZHAW)
- Zurich University of the Arts (ZHdK)
- Bern University of Applied Sciences (BFH)
- University of Applied Sciences Northwestern Switzerland (FHNW)
- University of Applied Sciences Western Switzerland (HES-SO)
- University of Applied Sciences and Arts of Southern Switzerland (SUPSI)
- University of Applied Sciences of the Grisons (FHGR)
- Kalaidos University of Applied Sciences (private school)

=== Federal Institutes of Technology and Cantonal Universities ===
- Swiss Federal Institute of Technology Lausanne (EPFL)
- Swiss Federal Institute of Technology Zurich (ETH Zurich)
- University of Basel
- University of Bern
- University of Fribourg
- University of Geneva
- University of Lausanne
- University of Lucerne
- University of Neuchâtel
- University of St. Gallen
- University of Italian-speaking Switzerland (USI)
- University of Zurich

=== University institutes ===
- Hochschulinstitut Schaffhausen (HSSH)
- IMD - International Institute for Management Development (IMD) (private)
- Graduate Institute of International and Development Studies (IHEID), Geneva (semi-private)
- Schweizerisches universitäres Institut für traditionelle chinesische Medizin (SWISS TCM UNI) (private)
- Stiftung Universitäre Fernstudien Schweiz, Brig / Fondation Formation universitaire à distance, Suisse à Brigue (part of SUPSI)
- Theologische Hochschule Chur
- Universitäre Theologische Hochschule Basel (STH Basel)
