= OAQ =

OAQ may refer to:

- Quito Astronomical Observatory (Observatorio Astronómico de Quito)
- Overall Allotment Quantity
- Ordre des architectes du Québec
- The Swiss Center of Accreditation and Quality Assurance in Higher Education, OAQ
