= PHW =

PHW or phw could refer to:

== Organizations, companies, and universities ==
- PHW Hochschule Wirtschaft Bern, a university in Bern, Switzerland
- Kalaidos University of Applied Sciences, another university in Switzerland
- Public Health Wales, which serves public health in Wales, United Kingdom
- AVE.com, a former Kyrgyz and Emirati airline from 1996 to 2012, by ICAO code
- Pure Home Water, which provides water supply and sanitation in Ghana
- PHW Group, a German meat processing company

== Other uses ==
- Pangasinan Heatwaves, a Filipino professional basketball team
- Hendrik Van Eck Airport, an airport near Phalaborwa, South Africa, by IATA code
- Public History Weekly, a peer-reviewed journal on public history
- Phularwan railway station, a train station in Pakistan
- Yakkha language, spoken in India and Nepal, by ISO 639 code
