= World Solar Challenge 1993 =

Trans-Australian car race

1993 Daido Hoxan World Solar Challenge
- The 3rd edition of the World Solar Challenge
- Host Country: Australia
- Dates run: 7 November 1993
- Start: Darwin, Australia
- Finish: Adelaide, Australia
- Total Distance (km): 3,013

Results
- Winner: Honda (Japan)
- 2nd: Biel College of Engineering (Switzerland)
- 3rd: Kyocera (Japan)

The 1993 World Solar Challenge was the third international solar-powered car race held over 3,000km from Darwin, Northern Territory to Adelaide, South Australia.

It was held from November 7, 1993 with the 'Dream' car from Honda Research and Development winning the event from 1990 winners Biel. Reports suggested Honda's vehicle cost AU$10 million, with Biel spending $3 million, with the total value of entrants estimated at $25 million.

Fifty-one entrants from 13 countries entered the race, which was completed at a record speed of 84.96 km/h, attributed to improvements in aerodynamics, motor efficiency and photovoltaic cells.

It was also supported by several mainstream automotive manufacturers, including Honda, Nissan, Toyota and Kia. Stuttgart University also operated a "semi-trailer sized" solar powered airship called Lotte to Adelaide as part of the event.

== Event sponsor ==
Japanese industrial gas producer Daido Hoxan was the naming sponsor of the event.

== Route ==
The World Solar Challenge runs across approximately 3,000km from Darwin, the capital of the Northern Territory, to Adelaide, the capital of South Australia.

== Results ==
Position	Team	Car	Country	Time (h:m)	Speed (km/h)
1	Honda	Dream	Japan	35:28	84.96
2	Eng. Col. Biel	Spirit of Biel III	Switzerland	38:30	78.27
3	Kyocera	Son of Sun	Japan	42:35	70.76
4	Waseda University	Sky Blue Waseda	Japan	42:50	70.35
5	Aurora	Aurora Q1	Australia	43:00	70.08
6	Toyota	Toyota56	Japan	46:34	64.71
7	Northern Territory University	Desert Rose	Australia	46:50	64.34
8	Cal Poly Pomona	Intrepid	United States	47:21	63.64
9	George Washington University	SunForce I	United States	47:46	63.08
10	Zero 2 Darwin	Be-Pal III	Australia	48:38	61.96
11	University of Michigan	Maize & Blue	United States	49.07	61.35
12	Nissan Motor Company	Sun Favor	Japan	50:21	59.85
13	Cal State LA	Solar Eagle II	United States	50:37	59.53
14	Stanford University	Afterburner	United States	51:38	58.36
15	Philips Solar Kiwi	Solar Kiwi	New Zealand	60:36	49.72
16	Mabuchi Motor	Let's Sunjoy	Japan	60:57	49.44
17	Sofix	Sofix	Japan	64:56	46.41
18	Tokai University	Tokai-51SR	Japan	74:22	40.52
19	Monash University / Melbourne University	Solution	Australia	74:50	40.27
20	Laughing Sun	Evolution93/B	Japan	75:48	39.75
21	Mino Family	Mino Solar III	Japan	76:21	39.47
22	University of Oklahoma	Spirit of Oklahoma	United States	79:37	37.85
23	Sonderborg Tekikum	Solgon Danmark	Denmark	79:43	37.80
24	Ashiya University	Sky-Ace	Japan	79:48	37.76
25	Dripstone High School	Aquila	Australia	81:17	37.76
26	Panda-san	Hosokawa-Go	Japan	84:15	35.77
27	Solar Flair	Solar Flair	UK	84:57	35.47
28	KIA Motors	ConSole to the Future	South Korea	85:27	35.26
29	Team Alarus	Alarus	Australia	86:42	34.76
30	Annesley College	EOS	Australia	87:35	34.48
31	Hokuriku Electric	Hokuden Phoenix	Japan	89:47	33.56

=== Retirements ===
Position	Team	Car	Country	Time (h:m)	Speed (km/h)
32	Hokkaido Auto	Sulis IV	Japan	87:30	32.08
33	Team Doraemon	Solaemon-Go	Japan	79:50	34.77
34	Solar Japan	Mainichi-Go	Japan	80:10	31.73
35	Mitcham Girls High School	ISIS	Australia	80:10	27.39
36	Morphett Vale High School	Photon Flyer	Australia	67:13	31.33
37	University of Puerto Rico	Discovery 500	United States	62:36	30.08
38	Team New England	TNE-II	United States	53:02	28.13
39	Le Soleil	Le Soleil	Japan	56:34	26.38
40	University of Western Ontario	SunStang	Canada	63:51	23.37
41	Team TR50	TR50	UK	71:20	20.92
42	San Diego State University, Suntrakker	SDSU Suntrakker	United States	52:10	20.55
43	Northern Territory Institute of T.A.F.E.	Trader	Australia	37.34	26.22
44	Meadowbank T.A.F.E.	Sunseeker	Australia	26:17	24.05
45	Villanova University	Solarcat III	United States	20:50	15.07
46	JCJS Solar Car	Phi Ohn Sigma II	Japan	21:55	14.33
47	Banana Enterprise	Banana Enterprise	Brazil	16:40	15.12
48	Hama Yumeka		Japan	15:25	15.03
49	Team Heliox		Switzerland	08:23	24.69
50	Team Moscow		Russia	03:35	9.77

== Awards ==
This edition of the event divided entrants into different competition classes based on their photovoltaic cell and battery material, institutional type and vehicle design. Awards were given to the top three place getters in each.

=== Silicon PV/Silver Zinc battery ===
Position	Team	Car	Country
1	Honda	Dream	Japan
2	Eng. Col. Biel	Spirit of Biel III	Switzerland
3	Kyocera	Son of Sun	Japan

=== Silicon PV/Lead-Acid battery ===
Position	Team	Car	Country
1	Team Sofix	Sofix	Japan
2	Team Solar	Solar Flair	UK
3	KIA	ConSole to the Future	South Korea

=== Schools/Private class ===
Position	Team	Car	Country
1	Team Philips	Solar Kiwi	New Zealand
2	Monash University / Melbourne University	Solution	Australia
3	Sonderborg Teknikum	Solvogn Danmark	Denmark

=== Two seater class ===
Position	Team	Car	Country
1	California State Polytechnic University Pomona	Intrepid	USA
2	Stanford University	Sunburner	USA
3	Team Alarus	Alarus	Australia
