= School of Business and Engineering Vaud =

Coordinates: 46.7813°N 6.6473°E

School of Engineering and Management Vaud (HEIG-VD), Switzerland
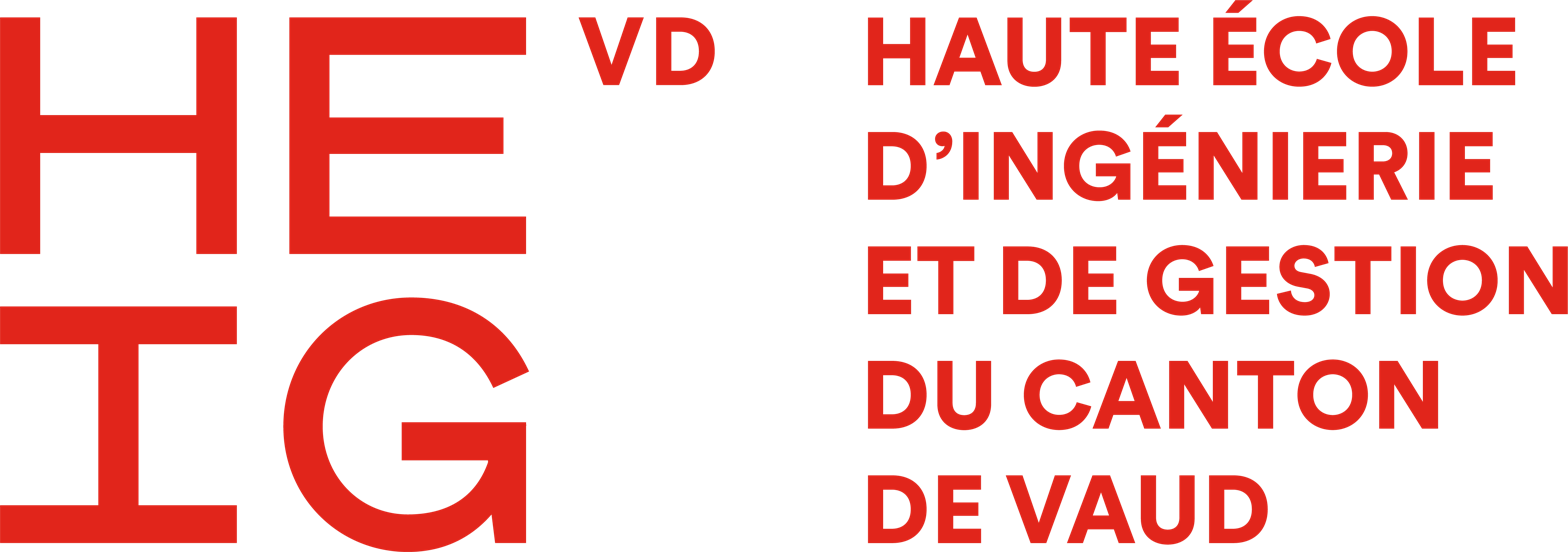
- Type: Public
- Established: 1956 as "Technicum Cantonal Vaudois"
- Affiliation: HES-SO
- Director: Ana Maria Nogareda
- Administrative staff: 640
- Students: 2000
- Location: Yverdon-les-bains, Canton of Vaud, Switzerland
- Campus: Urban
- Website: www.heig-vd.ch

Location: School of Engineering and Management Vaud, Yverdon-les-bains, Switzerland

The School of Engineering and Management Vaud (abbrev. HEIG-VD, in the official French form Haute Ecole d'Ingénierie et de Gestion du Canton de Vaud) is a public university in Yverdon-les-Bains, Switzerland. It was created by the merger of the EIVD (School of Engineering of the State of Vaud) and the HEG-VD (School of Business of the State of Vaud) on August 1, 2004. With its 2000 students, the HEIG-VD is the largest branch of the University of Applied Sciences Western Switzerland (HES-SO). It participates actively in regional, national, and international research and industry development in all areas covered by its teaching.

As of fall 2006, HEIG-VD has been grouped as a larger urban campus of three distinct sites in Yverdon-les-Bains: Route de Cheseaux, Centre St-Roch, and Centre Y-Parc.

== Bachelor programs ==
- Geomatics
- Electrical Engineering
- Systems Engineering
- Microengineering
- Mechanical Engineering
- Computer Science
- Media Engineering
- Business Administration
- Energy and Environmental Techniques

== Master programs ==
Master programs are offered in partnership with other HES-SO members. A portion of the instruction will take place at HEIG-VD and another will take place at other HES-SO universities.

=== Master of Science in Engineering ===
This Master program offers the following majors :

- Civil engineering (CE)
- Computer science (CS)
- Data science (DS)
- Electrical engineering (ElE)
- Information and cyber security (ICS)
- Energy and environment (EnEn)
- Mechanical engineering (ME)
- Microengineering (Mic)

=== Master of Science in Business Administration ===
This master program offers three majors :

- Business in Eurasia
- Entrepreneurship
- Information Systems Management

=== Master of Science in Territorial Development ===
This joint HES-SO-UNIGE Master's program offers advanced training in the fields of urban planning, geomatics, landscape architecture and spatial planning in both the North and the South.

=== Innokick - Integrated Innovation for Product and Business Development ===
This program offers a unique opportunity to explore the world of innovation through an interdisciplinary and immersive curriculum. Designed to train the innovators of tomorrow, this program will enable students to design innovative products and services while addressing current social, economic, and environmental challenges.

== See also ==
- List of largest universities by enrollment in Switzerland
