= Georg Vogt =

Georg Vogt may refer to:

- Georg Vogt (politician, born 1879), Liechtenstein politician
- Georg Vogt (politician, born 1946), Liechtenstein politician
