= AAQ =

AAQ or Aaq may refer to:

- Anapa Airport in Krasnodar Krai, Russia (IATA airport code AAQ)
- Eastern Abenaki language, ISO 939-3 language code aaq
- Dopaminergic cell group Aaq
- The Swiss Agency of Accreditation and Quality Assurance (AAQ)
