= Frank Bodin =

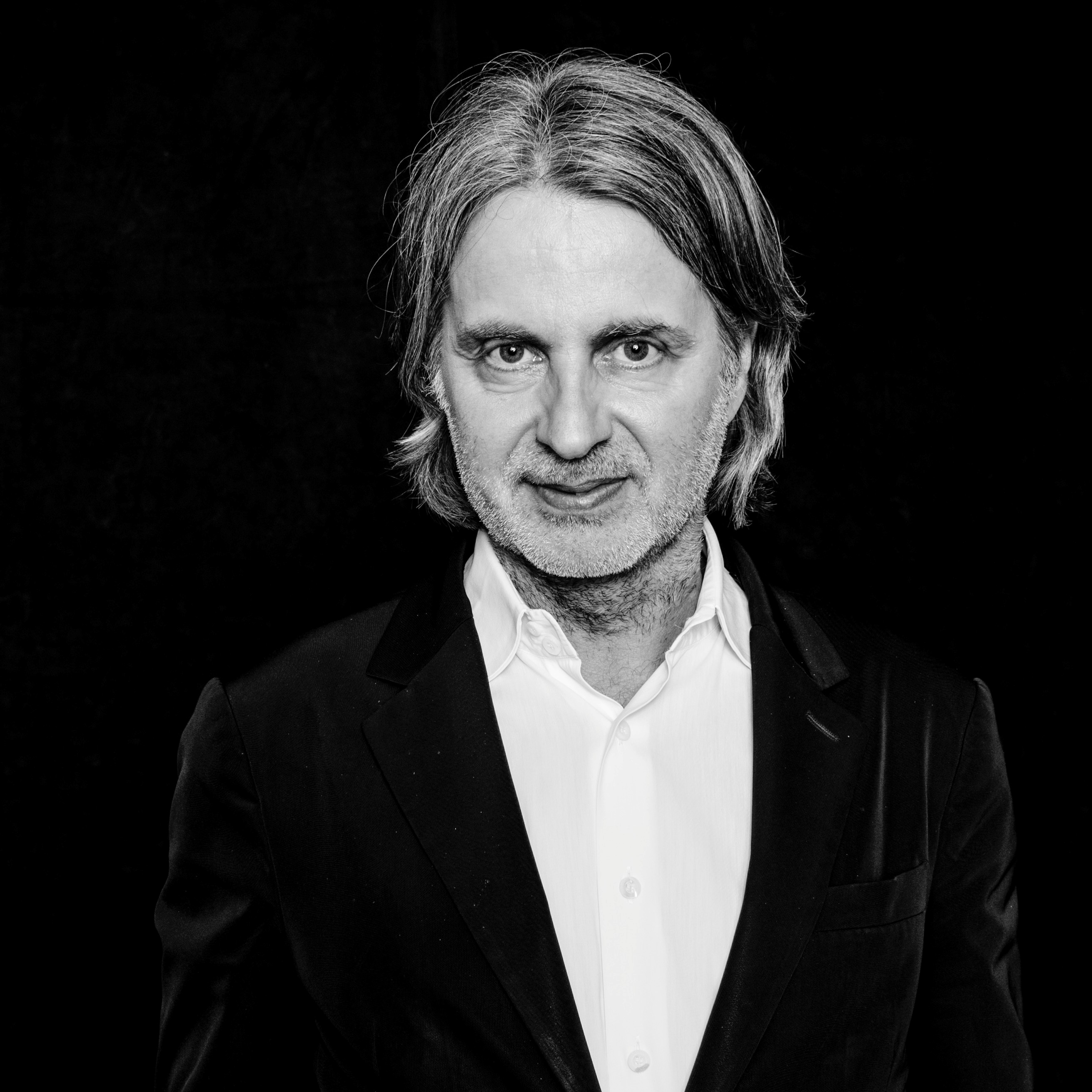
Frank Bodin 2021, portrayed as part of his ADC presidency. Photographer: Tobias Stahel

Frank Bodin (born March 29, 1962) is a Swiss advertising executive and Creative director. He is regarded as one of the leading figures in the Swiss advertising industry and is the author of several books.

== Career ==
Bodin first studied music at the Zurich Conservatory and later law at the University of Zurich. He began his career in 1992 as a copywriter and concept developer at GGK and moved a year later to Aebi/BBDO. In 1994 he gained international attention with the «Cross» campaign for Tibet, later supported by Oliver Stone, Richard Gere, Naomi Campbell, among others. From 1996 to 2001 he was creative director at McCann Erickson Geneva, where he contributed to the agency's turnaround.

As Chairman & CEO of Euro RSCG, later Havas Switzerland (2001 to 2018), he transformed the group into one of Switzerland's leading large agencies. He also held international leadership roles, including restructuring Havas Vienna as CEO (2011 to 2013) and chairing the European and Global Creative Council of the Havas network, operating in 75 countries (2011 to 2016).

Bodin also served as president of Leading Swiss Agencies (2005 to 2016) and of the Art Directors Club Switzerland (2013 to 2022) and is the only individual to have chaired both associations. He initiated the transformation of the former Bund Schweizer Werbeagenturen (BSW) into today's industry association Leading Swiss Agencies (LSA) and reformed the ADC.

In 2019 he founded bodin.consulting, an internationally active boutique agency for strategy, branding and creative marketing communications.

== Board and advisory roles ==
Bodin is chairman of the board of directors of Furrerhugi AG and serves on several advisory boards, including the SwissMediaForum and the Center for Communication at the Zurich University of Applied Sciences in Business Administration (HWZ). He is a trustee of MyHandicap and EnableMe, an ambassador for Cybathlon, and a member of other bodies.

== Awards and honors ==
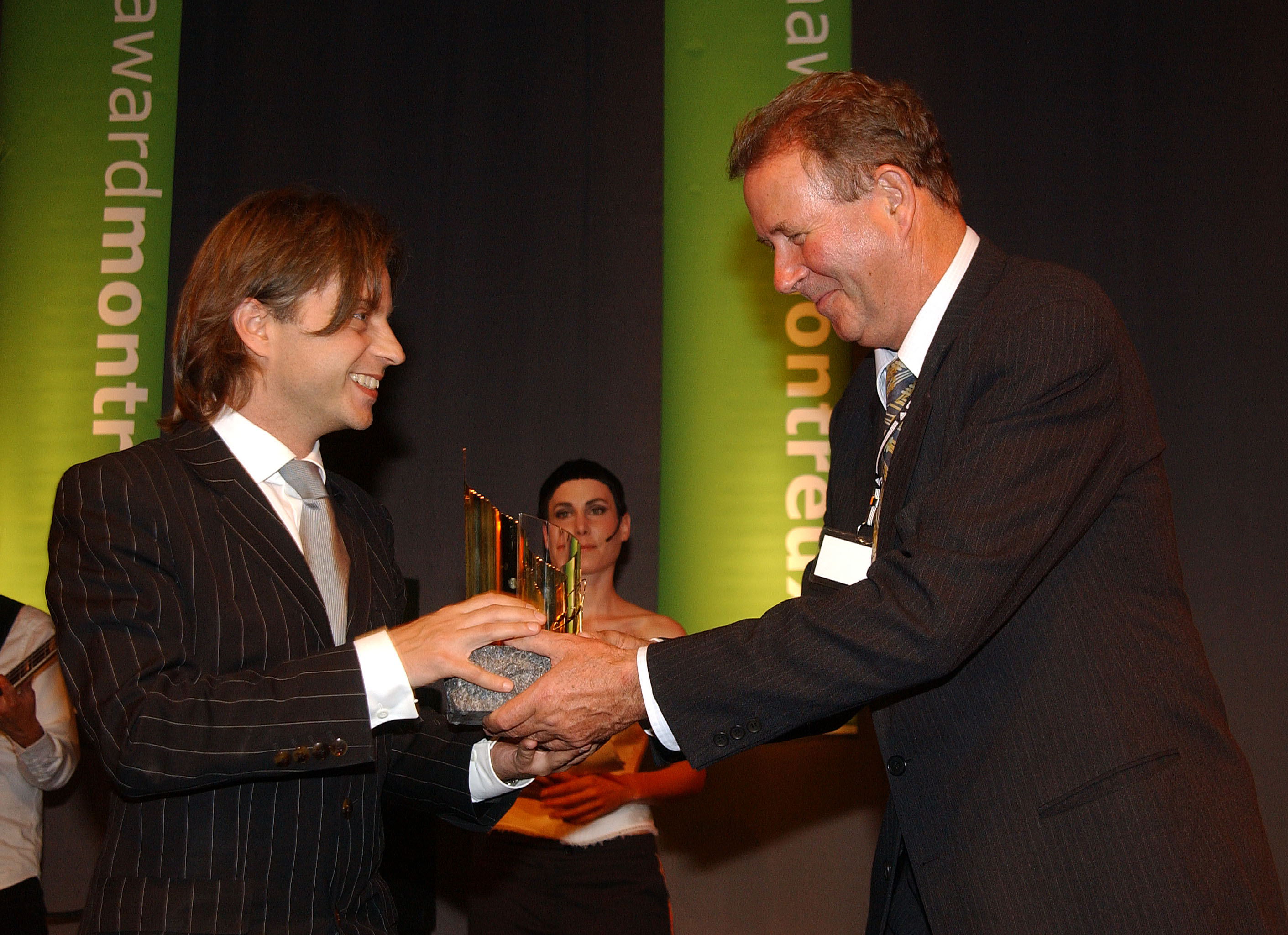
Frank Bodin receiving the Golden Award Montreux in April 2009.

His work received numerous awards at national and international creative competitions. He was named «Advertiser of the Year», «Man of the Year» by Havas Europe, and was inducted into the Art Directors Club Hall of Fame.

== Personal life ==
In his youth Bodin performed in concerts in Switzerland and abroad, including a 1979 performance with the World Youth Orchestra conducted by Yehudi Menuhin. In 1980 he won bronze at the Swiss Fencing Championships. From 1989 to 1991 he worked at the Hamburg State Opera as assistant director under Rolf Liebermann. During this time he also gained early experience as an author and as a freelance copywriter and concept developer for advertising agencies.

In 2007, his composition «Momentum» for string orchestra was premiered by the ⠀⠀Zurich Chamber Orchestra, conducted by Muhai Tang at the Tonhalle Zurich. In 2016 «enCore» for large orchestra was premiered by the Orpheum Foundation Orchestra under Howard Griffiths.

He is the author of several books and articles. His book “Do it, with love,” published in 2015, is now in its ninth edition. He also wrote a prominent advertising column for Kult magazine in the 2000s.

Frank Bodin is the father of four children.

== Bibliography ==
- «Is it Love?» 100 Essential Questions: Verlag Hermann Schmidt (Mainz), 2021, 2. Auflage (ISBN 978-3-87439-962-3)
- «Do it, with love» 100 Creative Essentials: Verlag Hermann Schmidt (Mainz), 2015, 9. Auflage (ISBN 978-3-87439-870-1)
- «Katz und aus – Essenzialismen»: Kontrast, 2004 (ISBN 978-3-906729-32-9)
- «Bilder fürs Ohr – Besser im Radio werben»: IPM, 2003
