= List of mayors of Balzers =

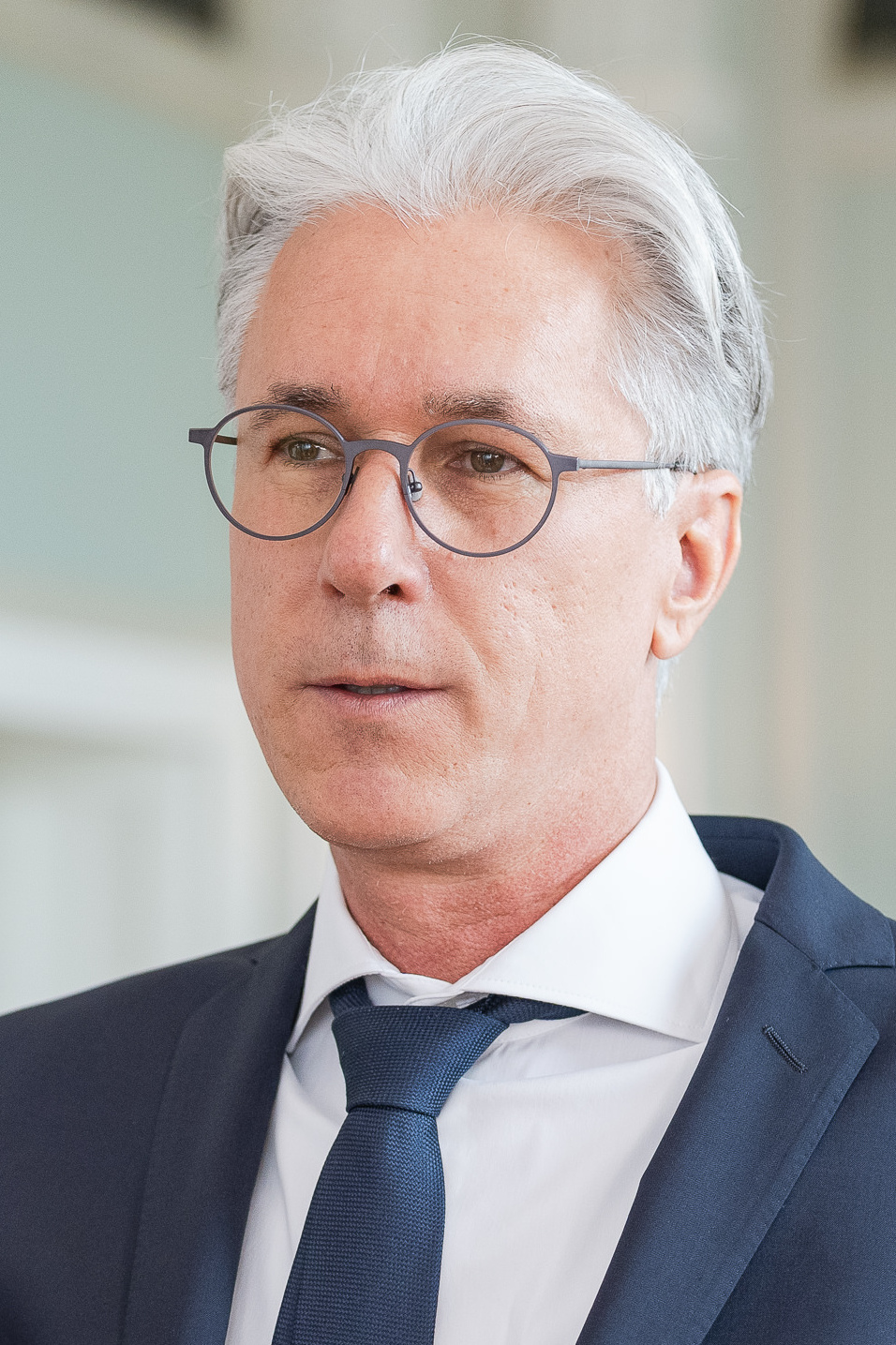
Karl Malin, incumbent mayor of Balzers

The mayor of Balzers is the head of the Balzers municipal government. The role has existed since the introduction of the Liechtenstein municipal law of 1864.

The incumbent mayor is Karl Malin, since 2023.

== List of mayors (1864–present) ==
List of mayors (1864–present)
| No. (Note: People are numbered according to periods served by the same person. For example, Josef Isidor Brunhart served as mayor in three non-consecutive terms, but is counted only once.) | Name | Term | Party | Ref(s) |
|---|---|---|---|---|
| 1 | Franz Anton Kaufmann | 1864–1865 | — | |
| 2 | Johann Georg Büchel | 1865–1867 | — | |
| 3 | Franz Wolfinger | 1867–1870 | — | |
| 4 | Johann Baptist Fritsche | 1870–1873 | — | |
| 5 | Johann Baptist Frick | 1873–1876 | — | |
| 6 | Johann Georg Vogt | 1876–1879 | — | |
| 7 | Baptist Johann Fritsche | 1879–1879 | — | |
| 8 | Franz Vogt | 1879–1882 | — | |
| 9 | Josef Isidor Brunhart | 1882–1885 | — | |
| 10 | Christian Brunhart | 1885–1888 | — | |
| (9) | Josef Isidor Brunhart | 1888–1891 | — | |
| (10) | Christian Brunhart | 1891–1894 | — | |
| (9) | Josef Isidor Brunhart | 1894–1897 | — | |
| 11 | Heinrich Brunhart | 1897–1900 | — | |
| 12 | Elias Vogt | 1900–1903 | — | |
| (11) | Heinrich Brunhart | 1903–1912 | — | |
| 13 | Emil Wolfinger | 1912–1918 | — | |
| 14 | Gebhard Brunhart | 1918–1927 | FBP | |
| 15 | Basil Vogt | 1927–1936 | Christian-Social People's Party | |
| 16 | Georg Vogt | 1936–1939 | FBP | |
| 17 | Alois Wille | 1939–1945 | VU | |
| 18 | Fidel Brunhart | 1945–1960 | FBP | |
| 19 | Walter Brunhart | 1960–1966 | VU | |
| 20 | Emanuel Vogt | 1966–1987 | FBP | |
| 21 | Othmar Vogt | 1987–2003 | VU | |
| 22 | Anton Eberle | 2003–2011 | FBP | |
| 23 | Arthur Brunhart | 2011–2015 | VU | |
| 24 | Hansjörg Büchel | 2015–2023 | FBP | |
| 25 | Karl Malin | 2023– | VU | |

== See also ==
- Balzers
