= HWZ =

HWZ may refer to:

- HardwareZone
- Heidemarie Wieczorek-Zeul, German politician (SPD) and former federal minister
- Zurich University of Applied Sciences in Business Administration (German Hochschule für Wirtschaft Zürich), in Switzerland
