= Karl Malin =

Austrian politician and engineer (born 1965)

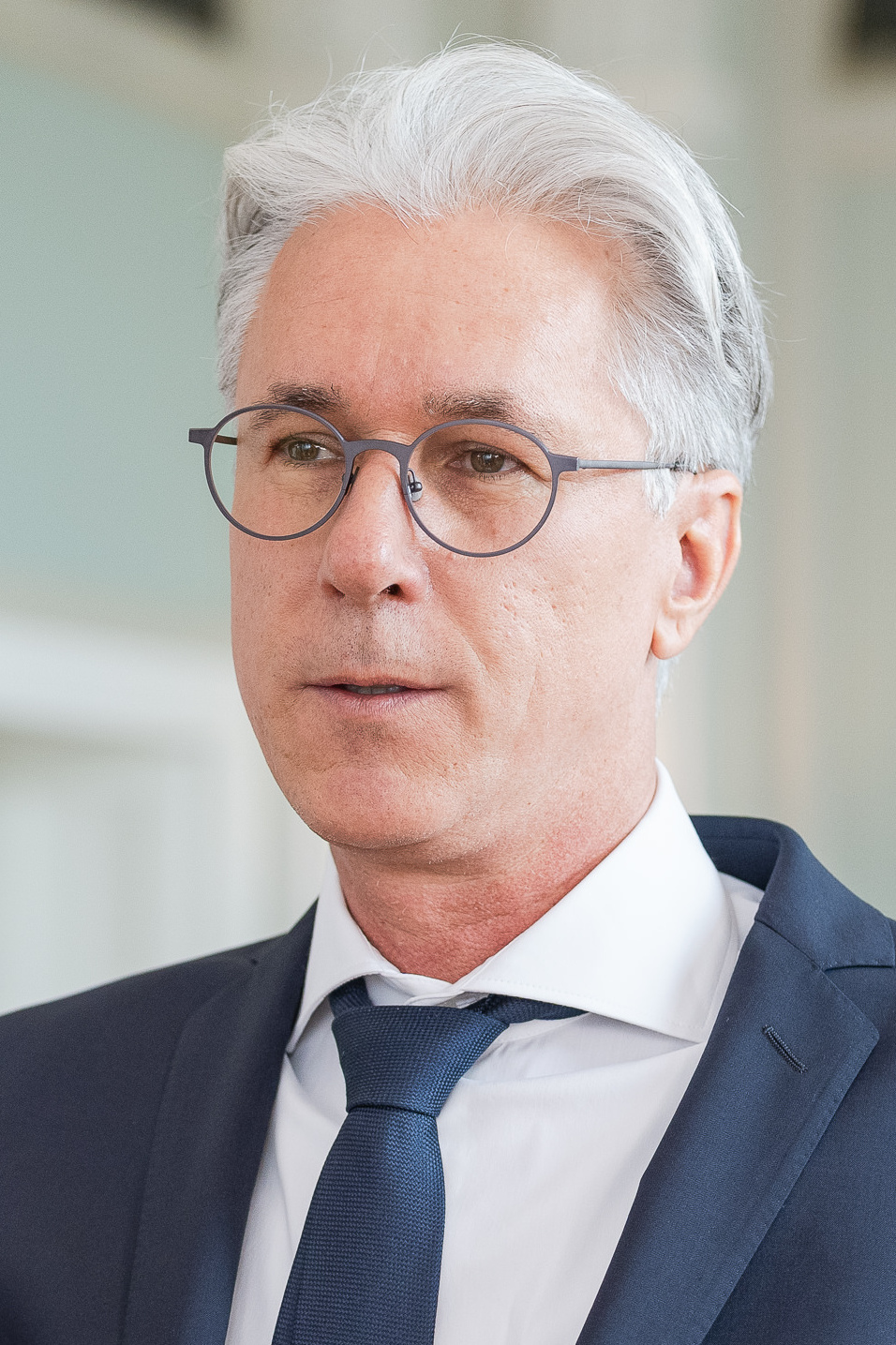

25th Mayor of Balzers
- Incumbent
- Assumed office March 5, 2023

Personal details
- Born: October 25, 1965 (age 60) Bludenz, Austria
- Party: VU
- Education: Chur University of Applied Sciences HTW

Karl Malin (born October 25, 1965) is an Austrian politician and engineer serving as mayor of Balzers, Liechtenstein since 2023.

== Biography ==
Malin was born in Bludenz, Austria in 1965. He studied Civil engineering and Architecture at the Chur University of Applied Sciences, where he graduated with a diploma in engineering.

=== Political career ===
Malin represents the Patriotic union of Liechtenstein. He has been a board member of VU Balzers since 2019. He is also a member of the Balzers environmental commission. He was nominated in 2023 as the Patriotic Union's candidate for the Head of the Balzers municipal government. During the 2023 municipal elections, Malin received 59.8% of the votes and won the position of Mayor of Balzers.
