= Luciana Vaccaro =

Italian-Swiss physicist (born 1969)

Luciana Vaccaro (born August 27, 1969 in Geneva), is an Italian-Swiss physicist. She has held the position of rector of the University of Applied Sciences and Arts of Western Switzerland since October 2013.

== Early life ==
At the age of 3 months, Vaccaro went to live in Naples, Italy. At the age of 10, after her parents separated, she continued to live with her father, a university professor.

== Education ==
She graduated in physics from the University of Naples Federico II in 1996. After an internship at CERN, she then went to study at the Swiss Federal Institute of Technology in Lausanne and obtained a doctorate in microtechnology in November 2000 in the subject of local probe microscopy on lipid membranes, under Fabienne Marquis Weible.

== Career ==
From 2000 to 2006, she was a senior lecturer at the Institute of Nano-Optics of the University of Neuchâtel, at the research centre of René Dändliker. She was responsible for setting up Interreg European Territorial Cooperation projects with France and was in charge of the “Highlights in Microtechnology” summer school project in microtechnology.

From 2006 to 2009, she was responsible for directing an MAS (Master of Advanced Studies) programme at the Institute of Health Economics and Management at the University of Lausanne, and worked on issues regarding university training in health economics.

From 2009 to 2013, she founded and managed the Grant Office at the Swiss Federal Institute of Technology in Lausanne, which aims to help and advise academics seeking research funding.

On 1 October 2013, she became the first female rector at the head of the University of Applied Sciences and Arts of Western Switzerland, which comprises 28 institutions of higher education spread across seven cantons, with more than 20,000 students, including 5,700 in Geneva and 7,800 in the canton of Vaud. The Governing Committee reappointed her in 2017 and 2021, each time for four-year terms.

In 2014, she was appointed president of the board of the Espace des inventions foundation, a science museum located in Lausanne.

She has sat on the Executive Committee of the Swiss National Science Foundation since 2015 as a representative of the Rectors’ Conference of UAS (Universities of Applied Sciences and Arts). She has sat on the Board of Directors of Innosuisse since November 2018, and has been vice-president since April 2019. She was appointed president of the chamber of UAS of Swiss universities in March 2021. In October 2022 she was elected as the new president of Swissuniversities. Her mandate starts in February 2023.

In November 2022, she received the medal of Chevalier de la Légion d'Honneur from the French ambassador in Bern.
