= World Solar Challenge 1990 =

Trans-Australian car race

1990 Hoxan World Solar Challenge
- The 2nd edition of the World Solar Challenge
- Host Country: Australia
- Dates run: November 7, 1990
- Start: Darwin, Australia
- Finish: Adelaide, Australia
- Total Distance (km): 3,028

Results
- Winner: Biel Ingenieurschule
- 2nd: Honda
- 3rd: University of Michigan

The 1990 Hoxan World Solar Challenge was the second international solar-powered car race held in Australia. It covered about 3,000 km (1,900 mi) through the Australian Outback, from Darwin, Northern Territory to Adelaide, South Australia. The event finished at the McLaren Vale.

The race was won by a team from the Swiss Biel Ingenieurschule team (now Berner Fachhochschule) with the car 'Spirit of Biel II' in 46 hours and 10 minutes at an average speed of 65.18 km/h, ahead of entries from Honda and the University of Michigan. 30 cars were entered in the event, five retired.

== Route ==
The World Solar Challenge runs across approximately 3,000 km from Darwin, the capital of the Northern Territory, to Adelaide, the capital of South Australia.

== Results ==
The 1990 event marked the first and only time a Swiss team has won the World Solar Challenge.

Rank	Team	Car	Country	Time (hr:min)	Speed (km/h)
1	Biel College of Engineering	Spirit of Biel II	Switzerland	46.13	65
2	Honda R&D	Dream	Japan	55.00	55
3	University of Michigan	Sunrunner	United States	57.25	53
4	Hoxan	Pheobus III	Japan	57.35	53
5	Western Washington University	Viking XX	United States	58.20	54
6	Australian Energy Research Laboratory	Aurora	Australia	59.90	50
7	University of Maryland	Pride of Maryland	United States	60.71	50
8	Crowder College	Star II	United States	62.96	48
9	Team Barossa	Team Barossa	Australia	63.29	48
10	Cal State LA	Solar Eagle	United States	67.76	44
11	California State Polytechnic University Pomona	Solar Flair	United States	68.03	44
12	Northern Territory University	Desert Rose	Australia	69.61	43
13	Monash University / Melbourne University	Parhelion	Australia	69.81	43
14	Kyocera-Kitami Institute of Technology	Blue Eagle	Japan	71.38	42
15	Star Micronics Pty Ltd.	Solar Star	Australia	80.06	38
16	Simon Co Ltd	CSK Simon 90	Japan	90.94	33
17	Dimitri Lajovic (Alarus)	Alarus	Australia	94.71	32
18	Konawaena High School		United States	96.21	31
19	Dripstone High School	Aquila	Australia	96.57	31
20	Annesley College	EOS	Australia	96.83	31
21	Hirotaka Oyabu	Sofix	Japan	96.83	30
22	Waseda University		Japan	96.83	30
23	Stewart Lister	Solar Kiwi	New Zealand	96.83	29
24	Queens University	Sun Quest	Canada	96.83	26
25	Aisin Seiki Co/AISOL	Aisol	Japan	96.83	25
26	Yamawaki	Ninja	Japan	96.83	22
27	Solar Research Association			96.83	21
28	Semiconductor Energy Lab	Southern Cross II	Japan	96.83	21
29	Helio Det	Helio Det I	Germany	96.83	20
30	Michiro Eguchi	Solar Japan	Japan	96.83	19
31	Sonderborg Teknikum	Grundfos/Solvogn Danmark	Denmark		
32	Morphett Value High School	Photon Flyer	Australia	retired	16
33	Phil Farrand	Holy Cheat	UK	retired	12
34	Nobuaki Hosokawa	Ryu Sei Go	Japan	retired	3
35	Mark Jensen			retired	13
