= Franklin Switzerland =

Private, nonprofit American university in Lugano, Switzerland

- Former names: Franklin University Switzerland, Fleming College
- Type: Private university
- Established: 1969; 57 years ago
- Accreditation: MSCHE, AAQ
- President: David Mills
- Faculty: 54
- Undergraduates: 386
- Location: Lugano, Canton of Ticino, Switzerland; 45°59′51.36″N 8°56′20.4″E
- Colors: Red and White
- Mascot: Falcon
- Website: www.fus.edu

Franklin Switzerland is a private university institute in Lugano, Switzerland. Founded in 1969, Franklin offers Bachelor of Arts and Bachelor of Science degrees accredited in both the United States and Switzerland.

== History ==
Formerly Fleming College, the university was founded in 1969, named after Benjamin Franklin. In 1986 it took residence in its permanent campus on Via Ponte Tresa in Sorengo. In that same year it was accredited as a four-year college by the Middle States Commission on Higher Education. In 2013 Franklin received full institutional accreditation from the Swiss University Conference and became Franklin University Switzerland in 2014.

In 2021, the institution has changed status in Switzerland and has been accredited as University Institute with the name of Franklin Switzerland.

== Academics ==
Franklin Switzerland offers a liberal arts education, focused on international exposure and experiential learning in a culturally diverse environment. The student body and faculty are international. The average class size at Franklin is 16. Four-year bachelor courses at Franklin cost between 117,000 and 220,000 Swiss francs. About half of the around 400 students are American.

In 2024, the Swiss Neue Zürcher Zeitung newspaper (NZZ) reported on deficiencies in Franklin's academic governance. It wrote that several of Franklin's professors had a weak academic record, with one having published nothing for 15 years. Moreover, according to the NZZ, several professors reported being pressured by university leadership into giving unearned passing grades to students from wealthy families, often after an intervention by these families. Franklin denied these allegations.

=== Academic Travel Program ===
The Academic Travel Program is an integrated part of the Franklin Switzerland curriculum and is included in tuition, with supplemental fees required for a few destinations. Academic Travel is a credit-bearing degree requirement in which students study topics relevant to a particular place or places and then go with their class to study on location for two weeks. Travel is led by faculty members and relates to the academic expertise of the individual professor and to his or her knowledge of a given country or area.

== Accreditation ==
Franklin is accredited in Switzerland by the Swiss Accreditation Council AAQ as a university institute. In 2020, the Council rejected Franklin's request for accreditation as a university, and the Swiss Federal Administrative Court rejected Franklin's appeal against that decision in 2023. The institution is required to change its name and branding accordingly by 2026.

Franklin is also accredited in the United States by the Middle States Commission on Higher Education. The institution is authorized to offer bachelor's and master's degrees through the State of Delaware.

== Campus ==
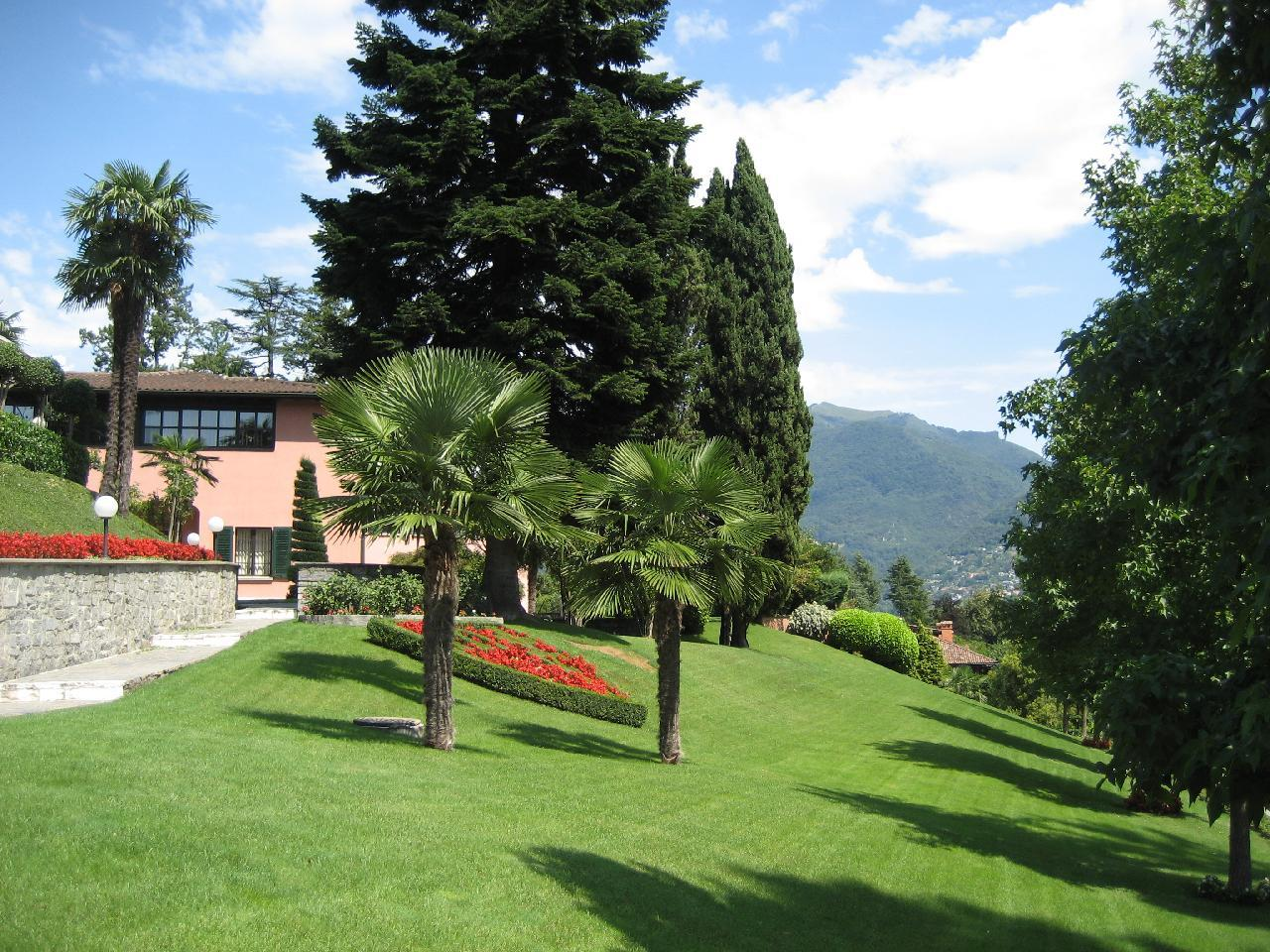
Franklin Switzerland, Kaletsch campus

The main campus (known as Kaletsch Campus), acquired in 1985, is composed of a private villa with attached library, auditorium, and classroom wing, surrounded by a wooded park. Also on this campus is a dining hall called the "Grotto". In 2005 the university acquired an additional campus nearby (known as North Campus), adding administrative, education, athletic, social and residential capacity. The current campus spans 2 hectares (5 acres). The Franklin campus is residential, and is on a hillside overlooking the town of Lugano, in the Italian-speaking canton of Ticino, Switzerland. The most recent building, called "McNeely Center of Ideas & Imagination", is a 6,270 sqm residential and educational space inaugurated in 2023 and designed by Flaviano Capriotti Architetti. The building has won the DNA Paris Design Awards 2024 Architecture/Educational & Sports and the Architecture Masterprize 2024 Educational Buildings

== Partnerships ==
Franklin Switzerland is a partner of the Global Science Film Festival, organized by the Swiss Science Film Academy, which was founded by Swiss scientists and filmmakers. Through this collaboration, Franklin hosts film screenings on campus, helping to raise awareness of the festival in Lugano. These films offer students the opportunity to engage with topics such as sustainability and science through a critical thinking approach.

== Athletics ==
Franklin Switzerland offers students a wide variety of sports and fitness programs, as well as activities to promote a healthy lifestyle. Some on-campus sports facilities include the Tone Athletic Center, two volleyball courts, a basketball court and a soccer field. Organized athletic activities include Men's and Women's Soccer, Men's and Women's Basketball, and Lugano Street Dance. Students are also encouraged to start athletic programs. Student-led activities have included Field Hockey, Yoga, Cross-fit, and Self-Defense. Since 2000-2001 (with an exception of a bye year in 2001–2002) Franklin's men's soccer team has competed in the National Swiss Division (5th League).
