= Zurich University of Applied Sciences =

University system in Switzerland

Zürich University of Applied Sciences
- Zürcher Fachhochschule
- Type: Public University
- Established: 1998; 28 years ago
- Budget: 860.7 million CHF (2020)
- President: Thomas D. Meier; Jean-Marc Piveteau; Walter Bircher; Jacques Bischoff
- Faculty: 4,016 (2020)
- Students: 23,926 (2020)
- Location: Zürich, Winterthur and Wädenswil, Canton of Zürich, Switzerland
- Campus: Urban
- Website: www.zfh.ch

The Zurich University of Applied Sciences (German: Zürcher Fachhochschule, ZFH) is a governing body composed of four separate universities (Fachhochschule). It is located in the city of Winterthur, with facilities in Zürich and Wädenswil, is the second largest university in Switzerland after the University of Zurich.

As of 2024, the Zürcher Fachhochschule encompasses four universities, covering such fields of study as architecture and civil engineering, health, linguistics, life sciences and facility management, applied psychology, social work, engineering and management and law.

== Universities ==
- Zurich University of Applied Sciences/ZHAW (German: Zürcher Hochschule für Angewandte Wissenschaften, ZHAW)
- Zurich University of Applied Sciences in Business Administration (German: Hochschule für Wirtschaft Zürich, HWZ)
- Zurich University of the Arts (German: Zürcher Hochschule der Künste, ZHdK)
- Zurich University of Teacher Education (German: Pädagogische Hochschule Zürich, PHZH)

== History ==
The Zürcher Fachhochschule was founded in 1998.

=== History of the Zurich University of Applied Sciences (ZHAW) ===
The Zurich University of Applied Sciences (ZHAW) was founded in September 2007, when the previously independent institutions Zurich University of Applied Sciences Winterthur, University of Applied Sciences Wädenswil, the School of Social Work and the School of Applied Psychology in Zurich merged. The former Zurich University of Applied Sciences Winterthur was itself made up of schools with long histories: the Technikum Winterthur was founded in 1874 as Switzerland's largest engineering school, and the Höhere Wirtschafts- und Verwaltungsschule was established in 1968. Both schools were the first of their kind in Switzerland.

== Programmes ==
A total of 36 Bachelor, 24 consecutive Master degree programmes and one Doctor of Business Administration (with a partner university) are currently offered. The general language of courses is German (Hochdeutsch). Notably all lectures at the School of Management and Law's bachelor programme in International Management are held in English, as are courses for exchange students. Generally, there is an increasing use of English observed in many other programmes.

== Facilities ==
The university has buildings scattered throughout the cities of Winterthur and Zurich, as well as campus-like facilities in Wädenswil. Despite the fact that the schools and institutes are not all centrally located, students are rarely (if ever) required to relocate to other venues. Eight libraries are available for use by members of the university, as are the six on-location canteens.

== Student life ==
Apart from dealing with all issues relevant to studies at universities connected to the Zürcher Fachhochschule, the university student association (VSZHAW) organises student parties and sells study materials and laptop computers in its own shop. The Academic Sports Association (ASVZ) offers a wide range of sports facilities to students. Among many other student groups, there is also a section of the Erasmus Student Network in Winterthur.

== Notable alumni ==
- Karin Keller-Sutter, head of the Federal Department of Finance
- Peter Voser, CEO of Royal Dutch Shell

== See also ==
- List of largest universities by enrollment in Switzerland
