= Georg Vogt (politician, born 1879) =

Liechtenstein politician (1879–1943)

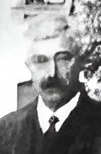
- Vogt in 1931

Member of the Landtag of Liechtenstein for Oberland
- In office 3 February 1936 – 4 April 1939
- In office 15 July 1928 – 13 March 1932

Mayor of Balzers
- In office 1936–1939
- Deputy: Heinrich Andreas Brunhart
- Preceded by: Basil Vogt
- Succeeded by: Alois Willie

Personal details
- Born: 25 November 1879 Balzers, Liechtenstein
- Died: 15 May 1943 (aged 63) Balzers, Liechtenstein
- Party: Progressive Citizens' Party

Georg Vogt (25 November 1879 – 15 May 1943) was a politician from Liechtenstein who served in the Landtag of Liechtenstein from 1928 to 1932 and again from 1936 to 1939. He also served as the mayor of Balzers from 1936 to 1939.

He worked as a construction worker in Switzerland and then as a farmer in Balzers. He was a member of the Balzers municipal council from 1915 to 1927 and again from 1933 to 1936.

== Bibliography ==
- Vogt, Paul (1987). 125 Jahre Landtag (in German). Vaduz: Landtag of the Principality of Liechtenstein.
