= PHW Hochschule Wirtschaft Bern =

PHW Business School Bern
- PHW Hochschule Wirtschaft Bern
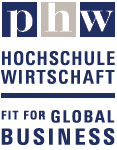
- Type: Private business school
- Dean: Prof. Peter K. Link
- Location: Bern, Switzerland
- Colors: blue and white
- Website: www.phw-bern.ch

PHW Business School Bern is a private business University of Applied Sciences in the Swiss Plateau that can be completed with diplomas recognized by the Swiss federal government.

== Organisation ==
The PHW Business School Bern is part of the Federal Council approved Kalaidos University of Applied Sciences.

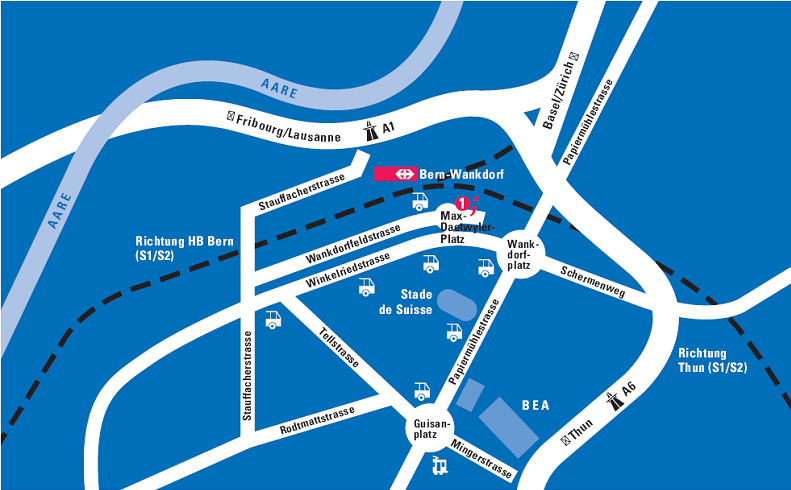
Accessibility and location PHW Business School Bern.

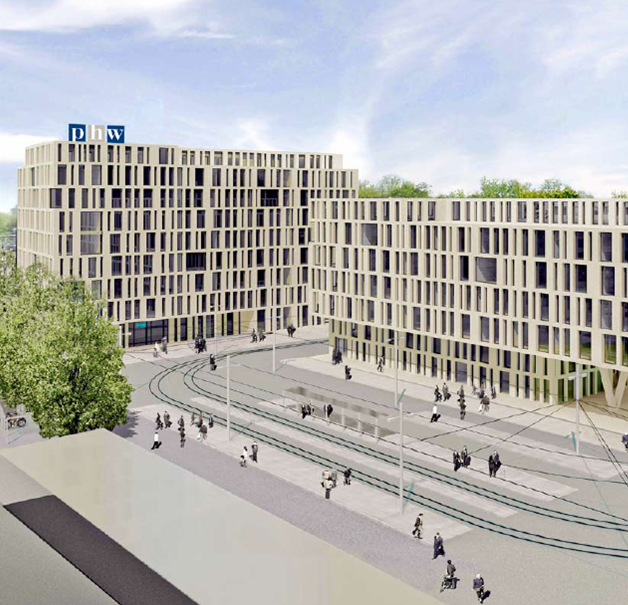
Building PHW Business School Bern.

== Programs ==
PHW Berne offers Bachelor and Master programs as well postgraduate courses and custom business seminars.

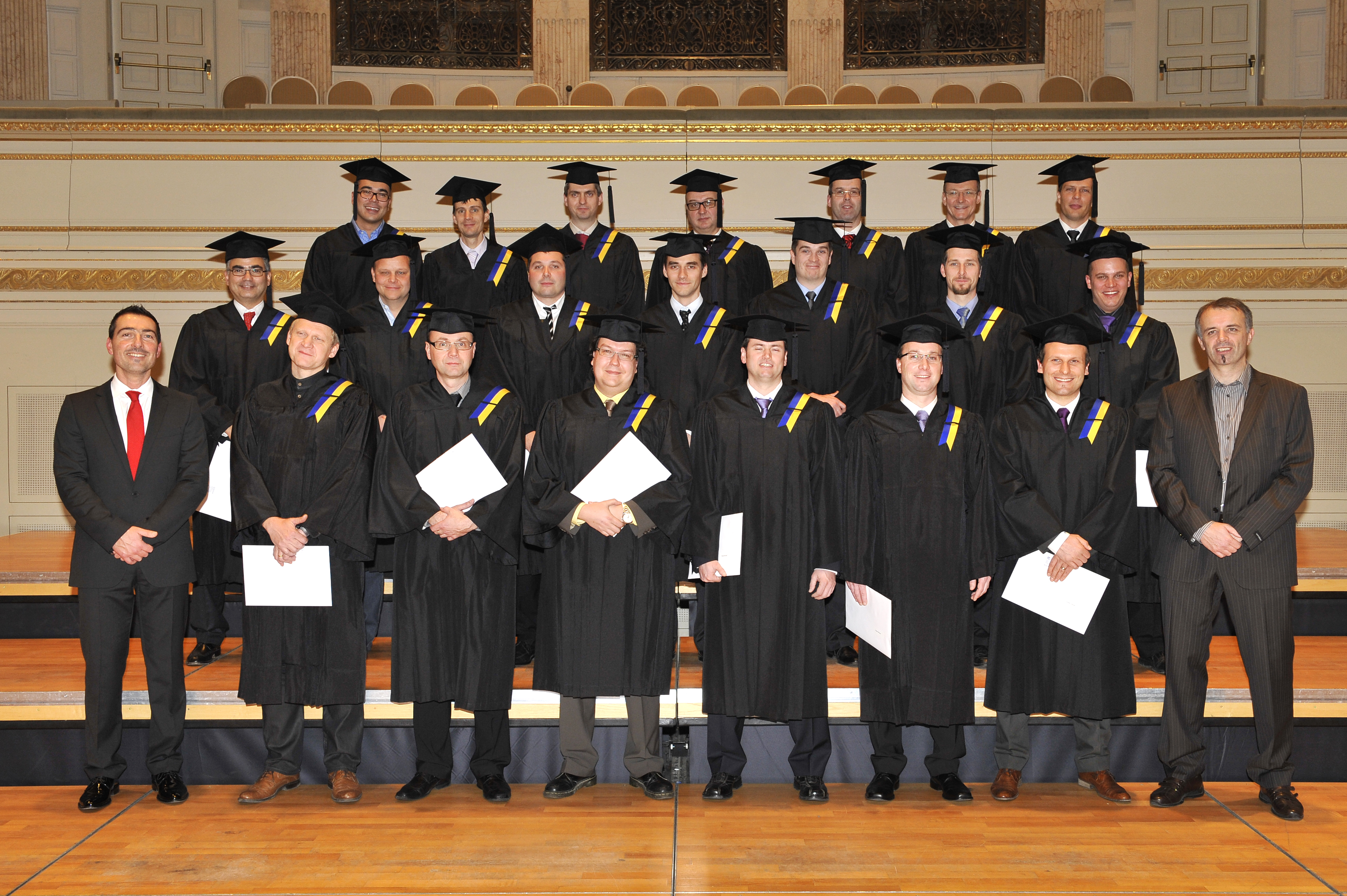
Graduation ceremony PHW Business School Bern.

== See also ==
- List of largest universities by enrollment in Switzerland
