= Overall Allotment Quantity =

Under the marketing allotment provisions of the sugar program authorized by the 2002 farm bill (P.L. 107-171, Sec. 1403), the Overall Allotment Quantity (OAQ) is the amount of domestically-produced sugar that processors of sugar cane and refiners of sugar beets can sell into the U.S. market during a fiscal year. The 2002 farm bill requires USDA to set the OAQ using the following formula:

(estimated sugar consumption + reasonable carryover or ending stocks) minus (1,532,000 short tons + carry-in or beginning stocks).

What USDA decides is a reasonable carryover stock level is closely watched by the sugar industry because of its influence on prices. Sugar production in excess of the OAQ (sometimes referred to as "blocked stocks") cannot be marketed.
