= Pädagogische Hochschule Bern =

Coordinates: 46.9536°N 7.4239°E

Pädagogische Hochschule Bern (PH Bern, English: Bern University of Teacher Education) is the training institution for teachers in the Swiss canton of Bern. It has been operational since September 1, 2005, and was created by merging various teacher training and continuing education institutions. In addition to training and continuing education, the PHBern conducts research and development as well as media education and offers services. With over 3,000 students (as of 2021), the PHBern is one of the largest teacher training colleges in Switzerland.

== Education ==
The PHBern trains teachers for all levels of elementary school as well as for secondary level II. It also trains special education teachers. The diplomas of the PHBern are EDK-recognized and therefore valid throughout Switzerland.

The library of the University of Bern and the PHBern in the University Center von Roll, Fabrikstrasse 8.

Different admission requirements apply depending on the course of study. The PHBern conducts its own preparatory courses or entrance examinations in order to introduce people without a gymnasiale Maturität to a degree program.

In cooperation with other universities, the PHBern offers three Master's programs in subject didactics:

- Joint Master Didactics of Sport
- Master of Didactics of Nature, Man, Society and Sustainable Development (NMG + NE)
- Master of Didactics of Textile and Technical Design (TTG - D)

== Research at the PHBern ==
The central tasks of the PHBern also include research, development and evaluation. The aim is to link research, teaching and school practice. The results of the research, development and evaluation projects support school and teaching practice and help to improve the education and training of teachers.

The research and development projects are financed with funds from the PHBern or through third-party funding. In addition, the PHBern conducts contract research and evaluations for third parties. Research results are made accessible to the public as well as to professional practice through various event formats and publications.
