= Swiss University Conference =

The Swiss University Conference (SUC) is the joint organisation of the cantons and the Swiss Confederation for university coordination and quality control.

== Formal basis and history ==
The legal basis for the organization was laid down, on the one hand, in the University Funding Act of 8 October 1999 and, on the other, in the Intercantonal Convention on Coordinating University Policy of 9 December 1999. With Switzerland signing the Bologna declaration leading to a comprehensive reform of structures; the Swiss University Conference is in charge of leading out the legal doctrine for the introduction of the Bologna Reform at the universities. It succeeded the former University Conference on 1 January 2001 under the Cooperation Agreement between the Federal Government and University Cantons on Matters Relating to Universities.

Since 1 January 2015, with the entry into force of the Federal Act on Funding and Coordination of the Swiss Higher Education Sector (Higher Education Act of 30 September 2011), the Swiss University Conference includes the seven universities of applied sciences (in addition to the ten universities and the two institutes of technology). Its German, French and Italian names were changed from Schweizerische Universitätskonferenz, Conférence universitaire suisse and Conferenza universitaria svizzera to Schweizerischen Hochschulkonferenz, Conférence suisse des hautes écoles and Conferenza svizzera delle scuole universitarie.

== Organisation before 2015 ==
=== Roles ===
It has the power to enforce a number of decisions in defined areas and has the following tasks:

- Issuing directives on the length of studies and recognition of previous studies and qualifications binding on the partners to the agreement;
- Awards project-specific grants;
- Periodical assessment of how National Centers of Competence in Research are allotted with respect to distribution of tasks among universities throughout Switzerland;
- Recognition of academic bodies and courses;
- Issuing directives on evaluation of teaching and research;
- Issuing directives on knowledge transfer in research.

Further, the conference makes recommendations on cooperation, on plans for the future and on balanced division of tasks within the universities; it informs parties affected by current projects and consults them.

=== Administrative structure ===
The Swiss University Conference consists of the nine ministers of public education of the cantons with universities, two representatives of cantons without a university, the Secretary of State for Education and Research and the President of the ETH Board. The President of the Rectors' Conference of the Swiss Universities also has a seat in a consultative capacity as do the director of the Federal Office for Professional Education and Technology, the vice-director of the State Secretariate for Education and Research and the secretary general of the Swiss University Conference. Day-to-day business of the conference is cared for by its general secretariat, which also assists various commissions such as: the Conference of Chief officers at the ministerial departments for university education, the Agency for University Buildings as well as the steering committees for equal opportunities, for the Consortium for University Libraries and for cost calculation.

=== Accreditation role ===
A close partner of the Swiss University Conference is the Rectors' Conference of the Swiss Universities (CRUS), which is entrusted with supervision of academic affairs. The accreditation process is conducted by the Body of Accreditation and Quality Assurance (OAQ).

== Organisation since 2015 ==
Since 2015, the Swiss University Conference includes the universities of applied sciences and is chaired by the Federal Councillor heading the Federal Department of Economic Affairs, Education and Research. It includes the cantonal ministers in charge of education. It also has a smaller council including only the cantons with a higher education institution.

The conference is in charge of coordination and quality control.

== See also ==
- List of universities in Switzerland
