= List of Swiss universities by enrollment =

This is a list of Swiss universities and other higher education institutions according to the size of their student population recognized by the Federal Higher Education Act, HEdA.

== Universities and higher education institutions in Switzerland by size ==
The following list ranks Swiss higher education institutions by their student population. Higher education in Switzerland is divided into three main sectors: traditional universities (Universitäre Hochschulen), universities of applied sciences and arts (Fachhochschulen), and universities of teacher education (Pädagogische Hochschulen).

=== Methodology and Scope ===
Student numbers refer to the most recent official data available for each institution (2024-2025) and include students enrolled in degree programmes (Bachelor, Master, and PhD), excluding continuing education (CAS, DAS, MAS), in line with Swiss Federal Statistical Office (BFS) methodology. For large networks such as HES-SO and SUPSI, the data reflects consolidated degree-seeking students. Data may refer to different academic years depending on institutional reporting practices.

Rank	Institution	Type	Total students	Year	Remarks
1	University of Zurich	University	28,664	2025	Official institutional data
2	ETH Zurich	University	26,198	2025	Official institutional data
3	HES-SO	University of Applied Sciences and Arts	21,195	2025	Official institutional data
4	University of Bern	University	19,741	2025	Official institutional data
5	University of Geneva	University	18,241	2025	Official institutional data
6	University of Lausanne	University	17,197	2025	Official institutional data
7	Zurich University of Applied Sciences (ZHAW)	University of Applied Sciences and Arts	14,619	2025	Official institutional data
8	University of Applied Sciences Northwestern Switzerland (FHNW)	University of Applied Sciences and Arts	14,527	2025	Official institutional data
9	EPFL	University	14,072	2025	Official institutional data
10	University of Basel	University	13,325	2024	Official institutional data
11	University of Fribourg	University	9,872	2024	Official institutional data
12	University of St. Gallen	University	9,987	2024/25	Official institutional data
13	Lucerne University of Applied Sciences	University of Applied Sciences and Arts	8,451	2024	Degree students only
14	Bern University of Applied Sciences	University of Applied Sciences and Arts	7,891	2024	Degree students only
15	SUPSI	University of Applied Sciences and Arts	6,121	2024/25	Excluding FFHS and DFA
16	University of Applied Sciences of Eastern Switzerland (OST)	University of Applied Sciences and Arts	5,150	2024	Official institutional data
17	Università della Svizzera italiana (USI)	University	4,749	2025	Official institutional data
18	Zurich University of Teacher Education	University of Teacher Education	4,611	2024	Degree students only
19	University of Neuchâtel	University	4,442	2024	Official institutional data
20	École hôtelière de Lausanne	University of Applied Sciences and Arts	4,031	2024	Official institutional data
21	University of Teacher Education, State of Vaud	University of Teacher Education	3,854	2024	Degree students only
22	Kalaidos University of Applied Sciences	University of Applied Sciences and Arts	3,522	2024	Official institutional data
23	University of Lucerne	University	3,446	2024/25	Official institutional data
24	HWZ University of Applied Sciences in Business Administration	University of Applied Sciences and Arts	3,391	2024	Official institutional data
25	Pädagogische Hochschule Bern	University of Teacher Education	3,149	2024	Degree students only
26	Swiss Distance University of Applied Sciences	University of Applied Sciences and Arts	2,982	2024	Official institutional data
27	UniDistance Suisse	University institution	2,448	2024/25	Official institutional data
28	University of Applied Sciences of the Grisons	University of Applied Sciences and Arts	2,380	2024	Official institutional data
29	University of Teacher Education Lucerne	University of Teacher Education	2,156	2024	Official institutional data
30	Zurich University of the Arts	University of Applied Sciences and Arts	2,125	2024	Official institutional data
31	Swiss Federal University for Vocational Education	University of Teacher Education	1,914	2024	Official institutional data
32	St. Gallen University of Teacher Education	University of Teacher Education	1,452	2024	Official institutional data
33	Graduate Institute of International and Development Studies	University institution	1,141	2024	Postgraduate degree students
34	University of Teacher Education BEJUNE	University of Teacher Education	912	2024	Official institutional data
35	Thurgau University of Teacher Education	University of Teacher Education	842	2024	Official institutional data
36	University of Fribourg Institute of Teacher Education	University of Teacher Education	718	2024	Degree students only
37	University of Teacher Education Valais	University of Teacher Education	641	2024	Official institutional data
38	University of Geneva Institute of Teacher Education	University of Teacher Education	584	2024	Degree students only
39	University of Teacher Education Fribourg	University of Teacher Education	562	2024	Official institutional data
40	Department of Education and Learning SUPSI	University of Teacher Education	498	2024/25	Degree students only
41	University of Teacher Education of Grisons	University of Teacher Education	422	2024	Official institutional data
42	Schwyz University of Teacher Education	University of Teacher Education	414	2024	Official institutional data
43	Franklin University Switzerland	University institution	405	2025	Degree students only
44	University of Teacher Education Zug	University of Teacher Education	392	2024	Official institutional data
45	Teacher Training University Schaffhausen	University of Teacher Education	238	2024	Official institutional data
46	Pädagogisches Hochschulinstitut NMS Bern	University of Teacher Education	218	2024	Official institutional data
47	Theological Faculty of Lugano	University institution	182	2024/25	Official institutional data
48	Theological Faculty of Chur	University institution	62	2024	Official institutional data

== See also ==
- Education in Switzerland
- Science and technology in Switzerland
- List of colleges and universities by country
- List of colleges and universities
- List of universities in Switzerland
