= Zurich University of Applied Sciences in Business Administration =

Coordinates: 47.3778°N 8.5328°E

University of Applied Sciences in Business Administration Zurich
- HWZ Hochschule für Wirtschaft Part from Zurich University of Applied Sciences
- Type: Private University
- Established: 1986 (1874)
- President: Prof. Matthias Rüegg
- Administrative staff: 600
- Students: 2'500
- Location: Zurich, Canton of Zurich, Switzerland
- Campus: Urban
- Website: http://www.fh-hwz.ch

The University of Applied Sciences in Business Administration Zurich (HWZ, German: Hochschule für Wirtschaft Zürich) is the oldest and biggest part-time university for economics and Business Administration in Switzerland and is a part of the Zurich University of Applied Sciences.

== History ==
It was founded in 1986 as the part-time HWV Zurich (University for Economics and Administration) by the KV Switzerland and the Juventus Schools Foundation of Zurich.

== Location ==
The HWZ is situated in the modern “Sihlhof” right in the heart of Zurich, 3 minutes from the main railway station.

== Keys ==
- Accredited by the Federal Office for Professional Education and Technology (OPET)
- Private and independent
- Full suite of courses: bachelor, masters, doctorate and other courses
- International academic network and partners from the business world
- Practical work by the students and lecturers
- Active Alumni Association with more than 2,500 members

== See also ==
- List of largest universities by enrollment in Switzerland
