= Zurich University of Applied Sciences/ZHAW =

University in Zurich, Switzerland

ZHAW Zurich University of Applied Sciences
- ZHAW Zürcher Hochschule für Angewandte Wissenschaften
- Type: Public University
- Established: 1874; 152 years ago as Technikum Winterthur; 2007; 19 years ago
- Affiliations: AACSB
- President: Prof. Dr. Regula Jöhl
- Administrative staff: 3,729
- Students: 14,995
- Location: Winterthur, Zurich and Wädenswil, Canton of Zurich, Switzerland; 47°29′49″N 8°43′48″E
- Campus: Urban
- Website: www.zhaw.ch

The ZHAW Zurich University of Applied Sciences (German: Zürcher Hochschule für Angewandte Wissenschaften, ZHAW) located in the city of Winterthur, with facilities in Zurich and Wädenswil, is one of the largest University of Applied Sciences in Switzerland.

The university has eight departments, covering architecture and civil engineering, health, linguistics, life sciences and facility management, applied psychology, social work, engineering and management and law.

== History ==
The ZHAW Zurich University of Applied Sciences was founded in September 2007, when the previously independent institutions Zurich University of Applied Sciences Winterthur, University of Applied Sciences Wädenswil, the School of Social Work and the School of Applied Psychology in Zurich merged. The former Zurich University of Applied Sciences Winterthur was itself made up out of schools with long histories: the Technikum Winterthur was founded in 1874 as Switzerland's largest engineering school, and the Höhere Wirtschafts- und Verwaltungsschule was established in 1968. Both schools were the first of their kind in Switzerland.

== Programmes ==
A total of 34 bachelor's and 20 consecutive master's degree programmes are currently offered.. The general language of courses is German (Hochdeutsch). Notably all lectures at the School of Management and Law's bachelor programme in International Management are held in English, as courses for exchange students are. Generally, there is an increasing use of English observed in many other programmes.

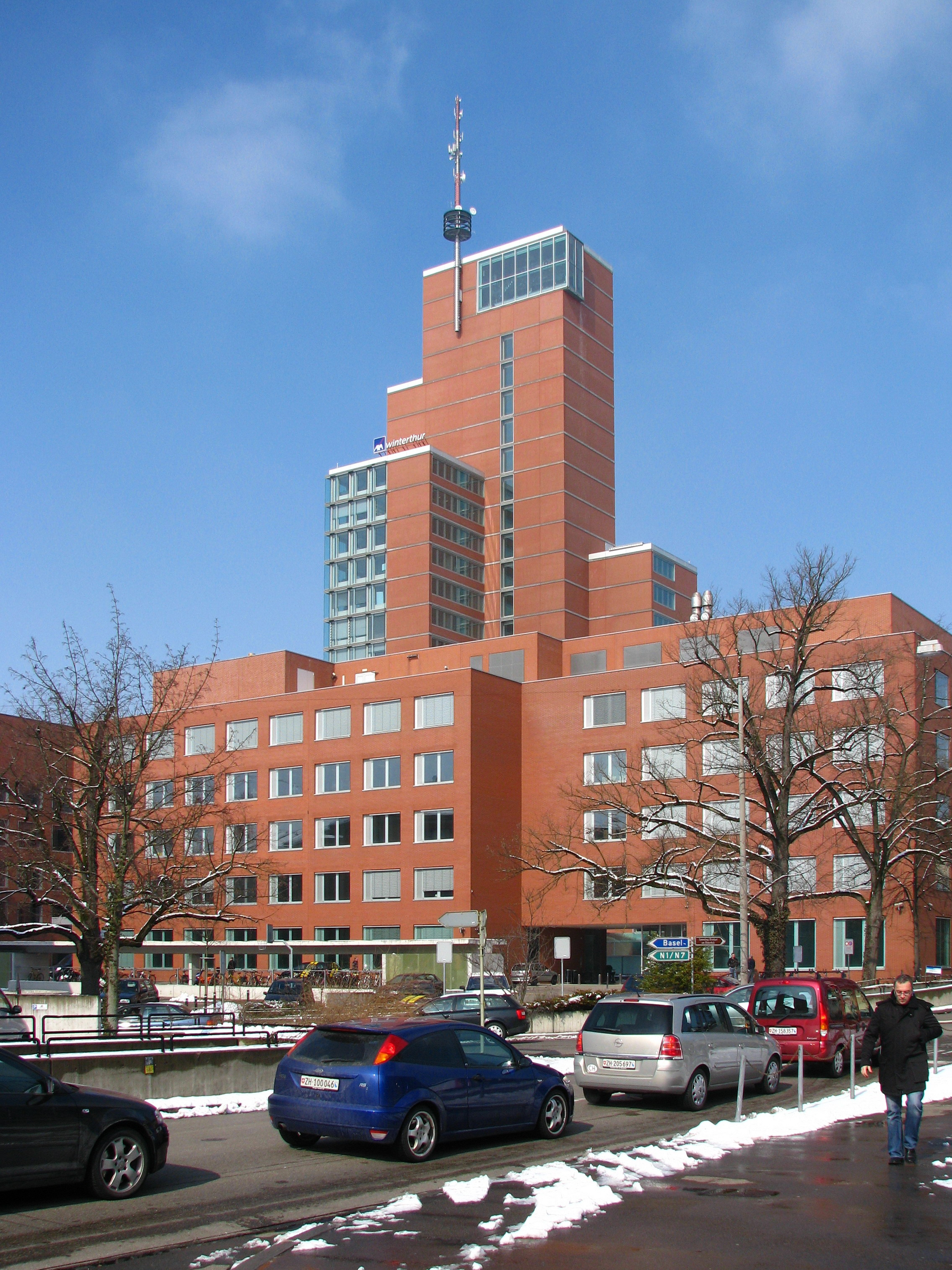
Red Tower, Winterthur

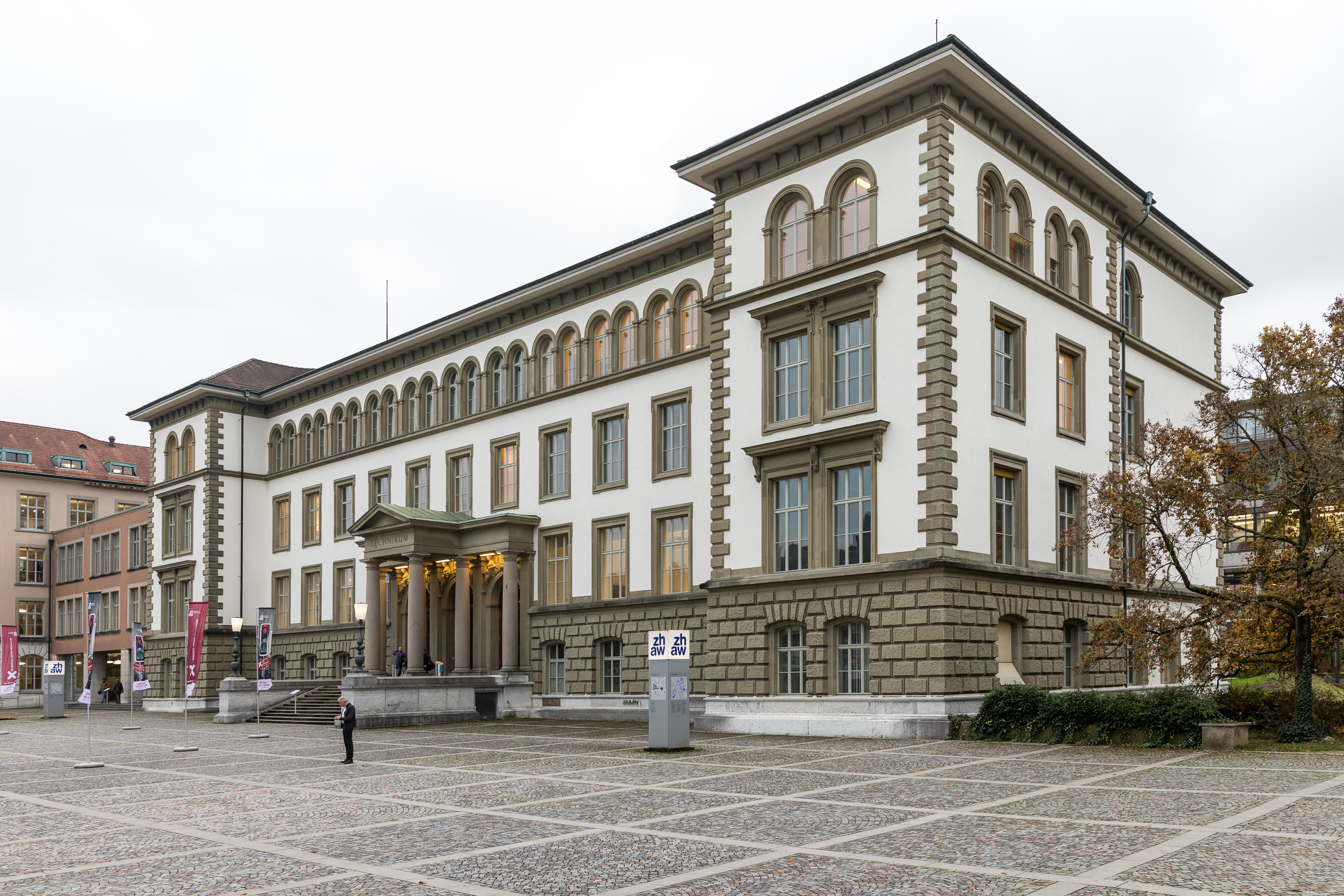
School of Engineering

- School of Applied Linguistics: The School of Applied Linguistics is further divided into the Institute of Multilingual Communication (IMK), the Institute of Applied Media Studies (IAM), and the Institute of Language Competence (ILC). The Institute of Language Competence offers a Bachelor or Arts in Language and Integration – German as a Foreign/Second Language. The Institute of Applied Media Studies offers a Bachelor of Arts in communication, with specialisation in journalism and organisational communication. The Institute of Multilingual Communication offers a bachelor's degree in multilingual communication, with specializations in multilingual communication, multimodal communication and technical communication. The school offers a Master of Arts in Language and Communication, with specialisations in conference interpretation, Strategic Communication Management, Multilingual Communication Management, and Linguistic Diversity Management.
- School of Applied Psychology offers a bachelor's degree and master's degree in applied psychology.
- School of Architecture, Design, and Civil Engineering offers a bachelor's degree and master's degree in architecture and a bachelor's degree in civil engineering.
- School of Engineering offers a master's degree in science in engineering and bachelor's degree in aviation, computer science, medical informatics, data science, electrical engineering, engineering and management with specialisations in industrial engineering and business mathematics, enterprise computing, mechanical design and engineering, mechanical engineering informatics, materials and process engineering, systems engineering / mechatronics and transportation systems.

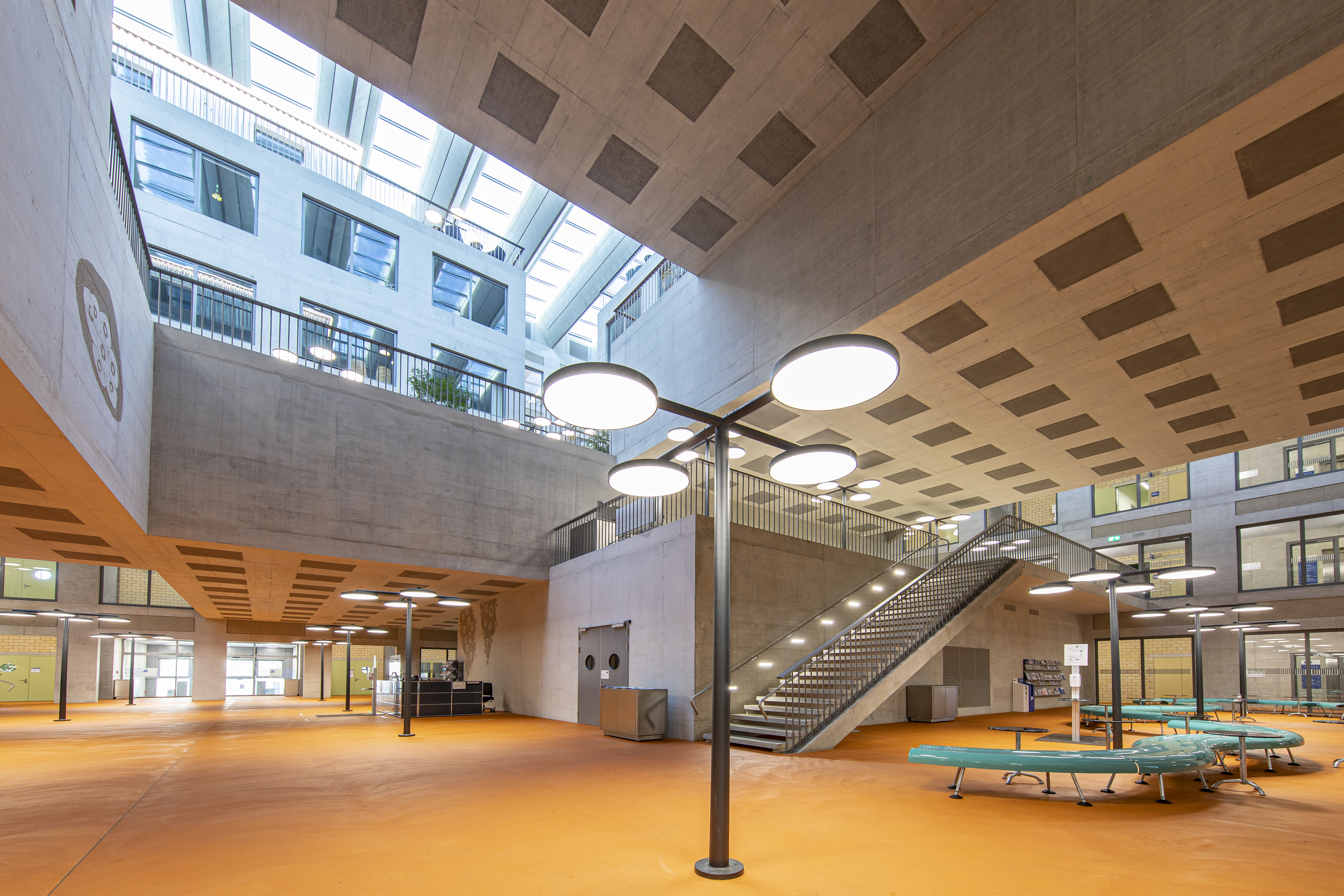
School of Health Sciences

- School of Health Sciences offers a master's degree in nursing, physiotherapy and an international master in occupational therapy as well as a bachelor's degree in midwifery, nursing, occupational therapy, physiotherapy and health promotion and prevention. Furthermore there is a PhD programme «Care and Rehabilitation Sciences» in collaboration with the University of Zurich.
- School of Life Sciences and Facility Management offers master's degrees in facility management and life sciences. Bachelor's degrees are offered in biotechnology, chemistry, food technology, environmental engineering and facility management.

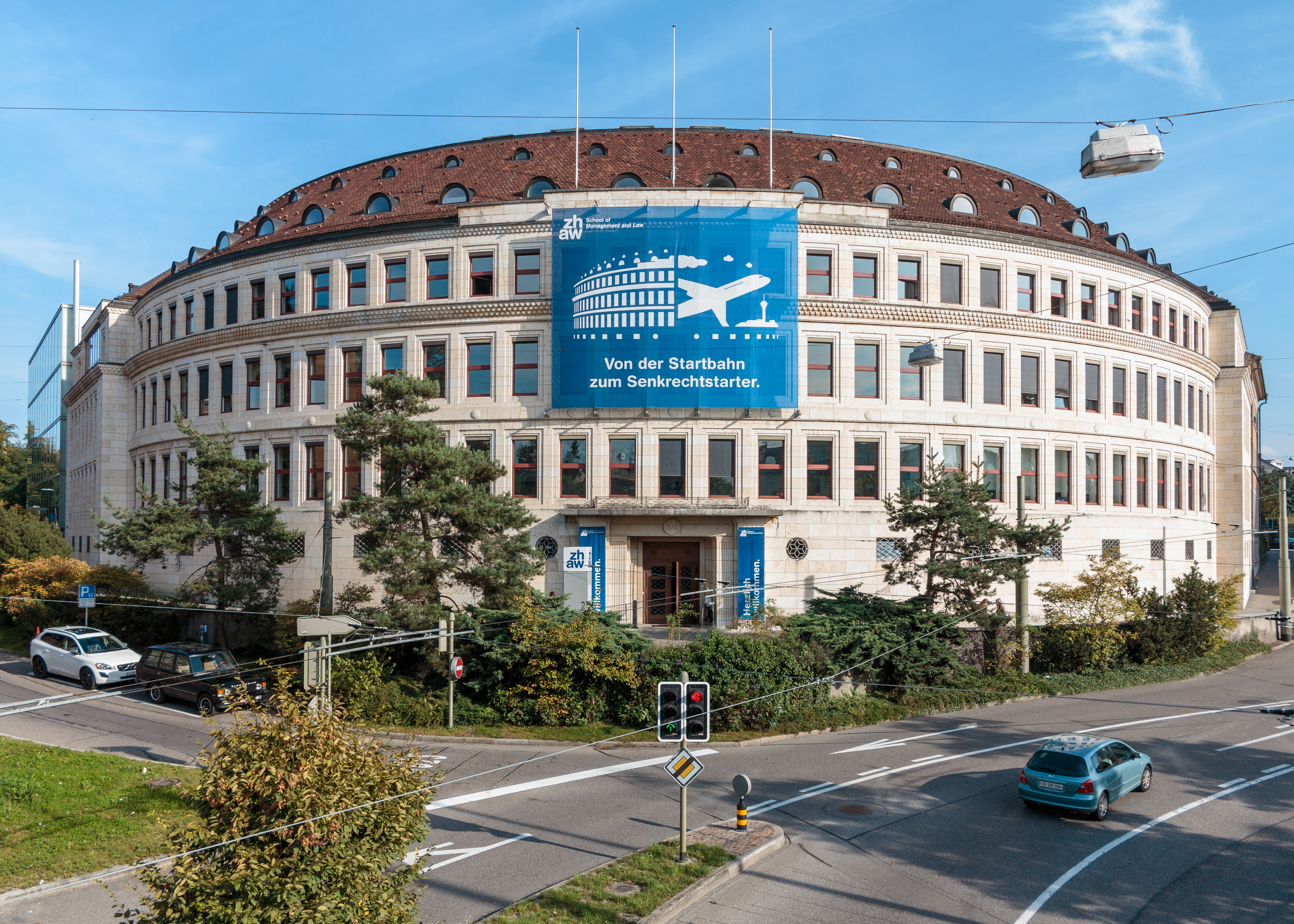
School of Management and Law, Winterthur

- School of Management and Law offers master's degrees in accounting and controlling, banking and finance, business administration, business information technology, international business, and management and law. It also offers bachelor's degrees in business administration, business information technology, business law, and international management. The best students can be invited to join the International Honor Society Beta Gamma Sigma. The School's MSc International Business was ranked 64th in the 2020 Financial Times Ranking.
- School of Social Work offers both a bachelor's and master's degree in social work.

== Partner universities (selection) ==
- University of Technology Sydney (Australia)
- Christ University, Bengaluru (India)
- Technische Universität Wien (Austria)
- Technische Universität Graz (Austria)
- UQAM - Université du Québec à Montréal (Canada)
- Århus Universitet (Denmark)
- Københavns Universitet (Denmark)
- Roskilde Universitetscenter (Denmark)
- Syddansk Universitet (Denmark)
- University of Helsinki (Finland)
- ESSCA École de Management (France)
- ESC Rennes School of Business (France)
- Ecole de Management Strasbourg (France)
- Université Paris Dauphine (France)
- Humboldt-Universität zu Berlin (Germany)
- Hochschule für Wirtschaft und Recht Berlin (Germany)
- Universität Witten/Herdecke (Germany)
- Universität Bielefeld (Germany)
- Universität Leipzig (Germany)
- Corvinus University of Budapest (Hungary)
- Technological University Dublin (Ireland)
- LUISS Guido Carli (Italy)
- Università degli studi di Modena e Reggio Emilia (Italy)
- Warsaw School of Economics (Poland)
- Kraków University of Economics (Poland)
- PSB Paris School of Business
- Jagiellonian University of Kraków (Poland)
- Saint-Petersburg State University (Russia)
- University of Cape Town (South Africa)
- Göteborgs universitet (Sweden)
- Koç University (Turkey)
- Sabanci University (Turkey)
- Cass Business School (Great Britain)
- University of Leicester (Great Britain)
- London Metropolitan University (Great Britain)
- Baruch College, CUNY (United States)
- California State University (United States)
- Boston University (United States)
- University of California (United States)
- Konkuk University (South Korea)
- Indus Business Academy, Bangalore (India)

== See also ==
- List of largest universities by enrollment in Switzerland
- Zurich University of Applied Sciences
