= Balzers =

- Municipality
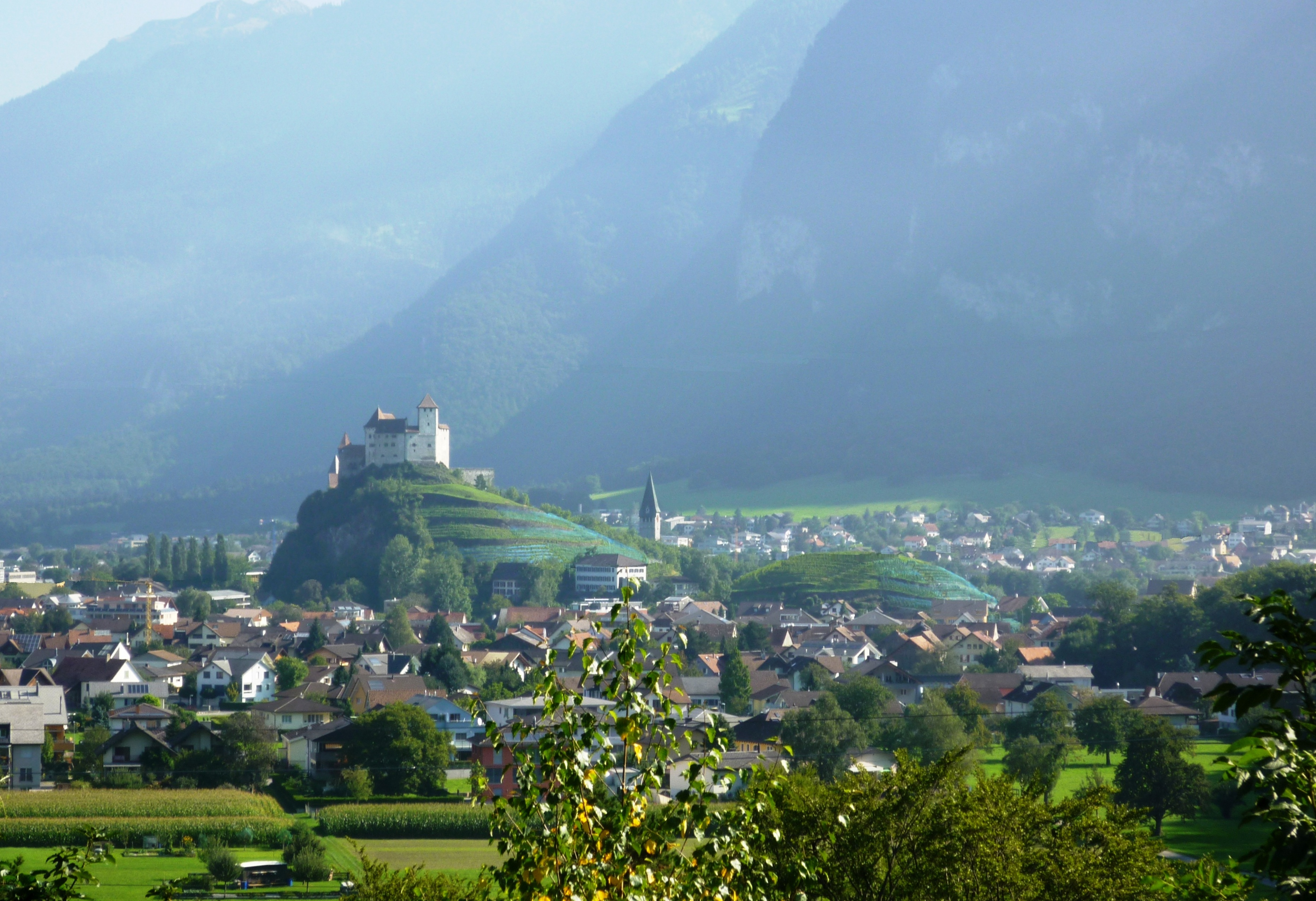
- Balzers and Gutenberg Castle in early September 2010

- Flag Coat of arms
- Interactive map of Balzers
- Coordinates: 47°04′N 9°30′E
- Country: Liechtenstein
- Electoral district: Oberland
- Villages: Mäls

Government
  - Mayor: Karl Malin (VU)

Area
  - Total: 19.73 km^{2} (7.62 sq mi)
- Elevation: 472 m (1,549 ft)

Population
  - Total: 4,806
  - Density: 243.6/km^{2} (630.9/sq mi)
- Time zone: UTC+1 (CET)
  - Summer (DST): CEST
- Postal code: 9496
- Area code: 7003
- ISO 3166 code: LI-01
- Website: www.balzers.li

Balzers (Swiss Standard German pronunciation: [ˈbaltsərs]) is a municipality and village located in southern Liechtenstein. In 2024, the village had a population of 4,806. The main part of the village is situated along the east bank of the Rhine.

== Geography ==
The municipality of Balzers consists of the villages of Balzers and Mäls, between which lies Gutenberg Castle. The municipality also contains two exclaves: one containing the alpine pasture of Gapfahl, located west and above the Valüna, and one along the western border of the country, containing the forest reserve of Zegerberg and the alpine pastures of Guschgfiel, Matta, and Güschgle. Guschgfiel and Matta are part of Balzers alpine cooperative (Alpgenossenschaft Balzers), while Gapfahl and Güschgle are part of Mäls alpine cooperative (Alpgenossenschaft Mäls). Zegerberg, a former alpine pasture now operated as the "Garsälli/Zegerberg" forest reserve, is owned by Bürgergemeinde (citizens' community) Balzers.

To the west of Balzers is the Rhine river, where it borders the Wartau and Sargans municipalities of the Swiss canton of St. Gallen. To the south, Balzers borders the Fläsch and Maienfeld municipalities of the Swiss canton of Graubünden. To the north and east, Balzers borders the Liechtenstein municipality of Triesen.

The municipality and its residents also own forest, pastureland, and the ruins of Grafenberg Castle in the neighboring Swiss canton of Graubünden. Ellhorn mountain was part of Balzers until 1949, when it was ceded to Switzerland; in return Balzers received an equally sized area and a significant reduction in Principality's wartime debt owed to Switzerland. The national government also compensated the municipality 412,000 Fr. for the loss of the Ellhorn.

== History and culture ==
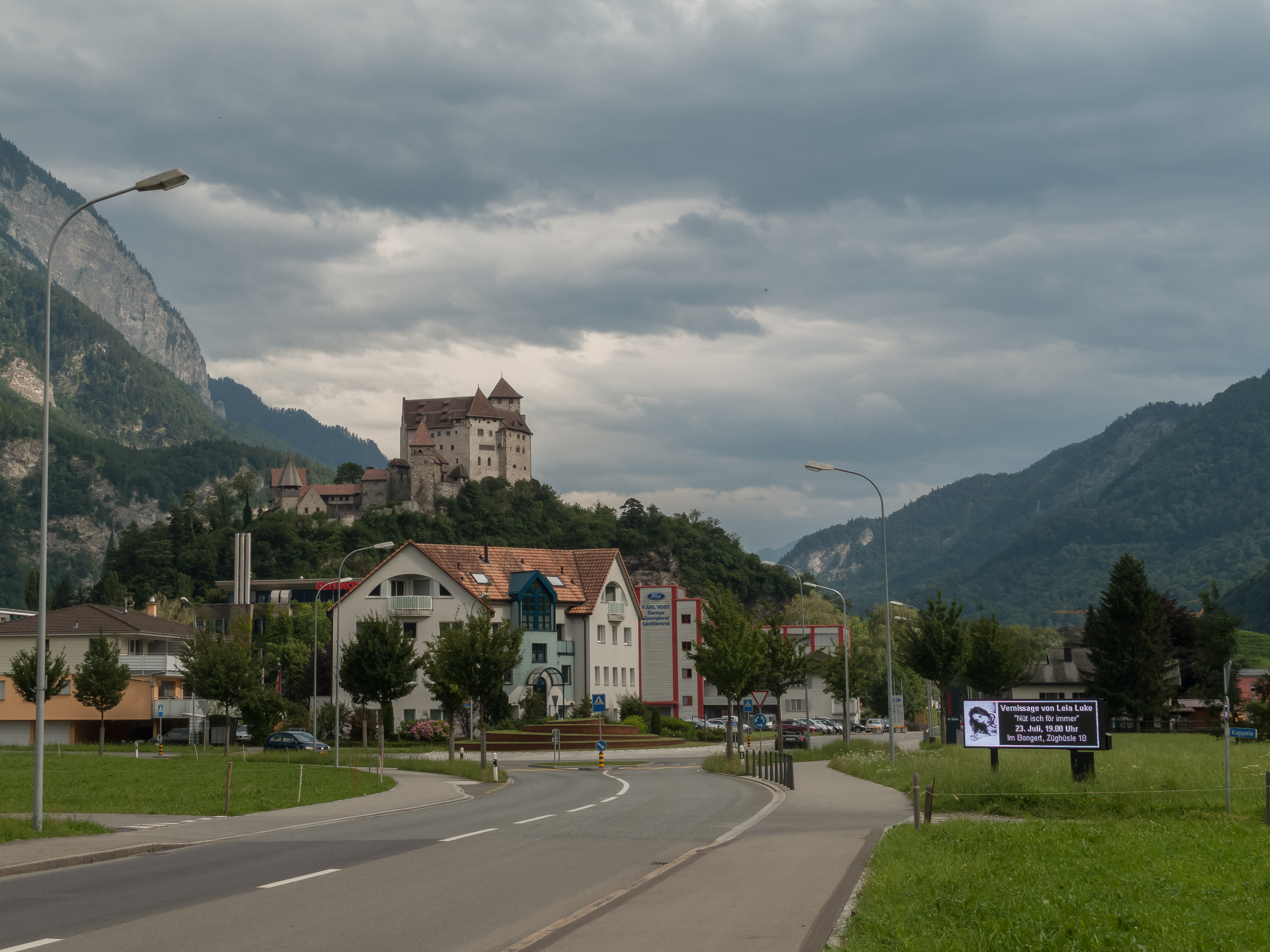
Balzers, entry (direction to Trübbach)

Historically, the present-day form of the village consists of two different villages, the actual Balzers in the east and Mäls in the west. Not visible to the unaware, the division still persists in the local village culture, where it manifests in half-serious local competition. Some customs, such as the "Funken", a springtime ritual with pre-Christian origins involving a huge bonfire, are still being practised by each separately. The location was first mentioned in 842 as Palazoles. The name originates from Latin palatiola, meaning small palace.

Balzers is the home of the Gutenberg Castle, which was built around 1200 on a rocky hill between Balzers and Mäls. The castle belonged to the House of Habsburg from the 14th to the 19th century.

In 1799, during the War of the Second Coalition, French troops encamped in Balzers for 20 days. In October 1799, the Russian troops led by Alexander Suvorov marched through Balzers after his unsuccessful Swiss campaign.

Much to the dismay of Balzers' population, the strategically important Ellhorn mountain was ceded to Switzerland in 1949, in exchange for an equally sized area. To the south of Balzers is also the St. Luzisteig Pass, which contains a Swiss Army training area.

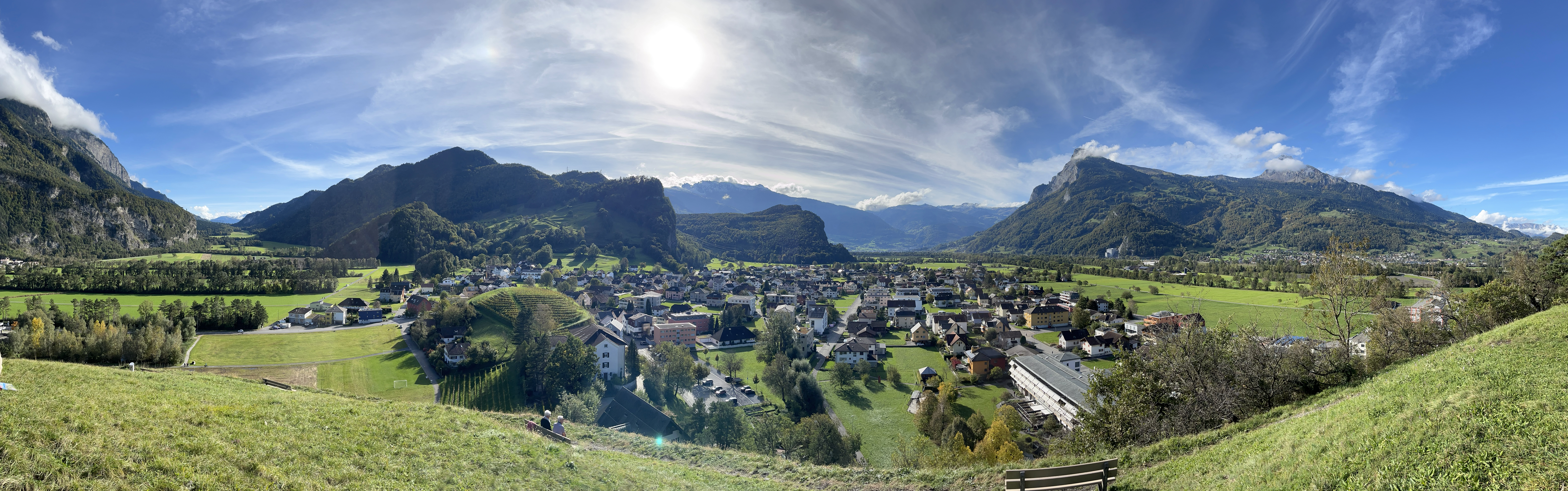
Balzers seen from Gutenberg Castle, looking towards the Swiss city of Sargans.

== Politics ==
Balzers is locally administered by the mayor and a 11-person municipal council, elected every four years since 1975. The incumbent mayor is Karl Malin, since 2023.

=== Last election ===
| Party | Votes | % | Seats | +/– |
|---|---|---|---|---|
| Patriotic Union | 10,408 | 55.07 | 6 | +1 |
| Progressive Citizens' Party | 6,593 | 34.88 | 4 | –1 |
| Free List | 1,899 | 10.05 | 1 | 0 |
| Total | 18,900 | 100.00 | 11 | 0 |
| Valid votes | 1,890 | 93.38 | | |
| Invalid votes | 70 | 3.46 | | |
| Blank votes | 64 | 3.16 | | |
| Total votes | 2,024 | 100.00 | | |
| Registered voters/turnout | 2,643 | 76.58 | | |
Source: Gemeindewahlen

== Transport ==
A ferry operated in Mäls until Balzers' first Rhine bridge was built out of wood in 1870–1871. A concrete bridge was built in 1967–1968. The wooden bridge burned down in 1972; in its place is now a concrete pedestrian bridge from 1975.

=== Heliport ===
Balzers has a heliport available for charter flights (IATA: -, ICAO: LSXB) (47.06812°N 9.48118°E). It is operated by the company Rhein-Helikopter AG, founded in 1983. The heliport has no border-control facilities; therefore, the only flights permitted to use it are those heading to and from elsewhere within the Schengen Area.

| Aircraft | Year implemented | Type | In service | Role |
|---|---|---|---|---|
| Ecureuil AS 350 | 2005, 2008, and 2012 | B3 | 3 | Used for transporting people |
| Guimbal Cabri G2 | 2011 | | 1 | Purchased for a new pilot training program, started April 2011 |
| Kaman K-Max | 2006 | 1200 | 1 | Used for transporting cargo |

The nearest passenger airports are St. Gallen-Altenrhein Airport, located 60 km (37 mi) north and Zurich Airport, located 107 km (66 mi) north west of Balzers.

== Economy ==
=== Oerlikon Balzers ===
The headquarters of the major thin film coating, solar and vacuum technology company Oerlikon Balzers is located in Balzers.

== Sports ==
FC Balzers plays in Swiss 1. Liga. They play at the Sportplatz Rheinau, a stadium with a capacity of 2,000.

== Notable people ==
- Xaver Frick (1913 in Balzers – 2009) Olympic track and field athlete and cross-country skier. He competed in track sprinting events in the 1936 Summer Olympics in Berlin and cross-country skiing at the 1948 Winter Olympics in St. Moritz. Frick is the only Liechtenstein athlete to date to have competed in both the Summer and Winter Olympic Games. He was awarded a Golden Laurel in 2003 by the government of Liechtenstein for outstanding contributions to sport.
- Andrea Willi (born 1955), Minister of Foreign Affairs (1993–2001).
- Christine Wohlwend (born 1978), politician.
