= University of Applied Sciences and Arts of Western Switzerland =

University in Switzerland

- Haute école spécialisée de Suisse occidentale Fachhochschule Westschweiz
- Type: Public University
- Accreditation: Swiss Accreditation Council
- Location: Switzerland; 47.3625°N 7.3522°E
- Website: www.hes-so.ch

The University of Applied Sciences and Arts of Western Switzerland (French: HES-SO Haute école spécialisée de Suisse occidentale) is situated in Western Switzerland. It is formally accredited by the Swiss Accreditation Council. The university is divided into six faculties: Design and Fine Arts; Business, Management and Services; Engineering and Architecture; Music and Performing Arts; Health; and Social Work.

== The University of Applied Sciences and Arts and its schools ==
The HES-SO University of Applied Sciences and Arts of Western Switzerland (HES-SO Haute école spécialisée de Suisse occidentale) has 28 institutions of higher education. Its various study streams and research activities fall into six faculties: Design and Fine Arts; Business, Management and Services; Engineering and Architecture; Music and Performing Arts; Health; and Social Work.

Various Bachelor, Master, MBA degrees are awarded by affiliated schools.

=== HE-ARC ===
- HE-Arc Conservation-restauration
- Haute école de gestion (HEG-Arc)
- HE-Arc Ingénierie
- HE-Arc Santé

=== HES-SO Fribourg ===
- Haute école d'ingénierie et d'architecture de Fribourg (HEIA-FR)
- Haute école de gestion Fribourg (HEG-FR)
- Haute école de santé Fribourg (HEdS-FR)
- Haute école de travail social Fribourg (HETS-FR)

=== HES-SO Genève ===
- Haute école d'art et de design de Genève (HEAD)
- Haute école du Paysage, d'Ingénierie et d'Architecture (Hepia)
- Haute école de gestion Genève (HEG Genève)
- Haute école de santé Genève (HEdS-GE)
- Haute école de travail social Genève (HETS-GE)
- Haute école de musique (HEM)

=== HES-SO Valais-Wallis ===
- École cantonale d'art du Valais (ECAV)
- Haute école de gestion & Tourisme (HEGT)
- Haute école de travail social Valais (HETS-VS)
- Haute école de santé Valais (HEdS-VS)
- Haute école d'ingénierie Valais (HEI-VS)

=== Hautes écoles vaudoises de type HES ===
- Haute école d'ingénierie et de gestion du canton de Vaud (HEIG-VD)
- École cantonale d'art de Lausanne (ECAL)
- Haute école de la santé - La Source
- Haute école de la santé Vaud (HESAV)
- Haute école de travail social et de la santé (HETSL)
- Haute école de musique de Lausanne (HEMU)

=== Hautes écoles associées à la HES-SO par une convention ===
- Haute école de viticulture et oenologie de Changins
- École hôtelière de Lausanne (EHL)
- Haute école des arts de la scène - La Manufacture

== Master's degree ==
The university also offer numerous Master's degrees. Most applied master's degree courses take place in multiple affiliated schools while the central courses are given on the Lausanne Campus. Selected programs:

- Master of Arts HES-SO/BFH in Architecture (Jointmaster)
- Master of Arts HES-SO en Travail social (avril or novembre)
- Master of Science HES-SO in Life Sciences
- Master of Science HES-SO Integrated Innovation for Product and Business Development (Innokick)
- Master of Science HES-SO in Engineering (MSE), with 3 possible orientations:
  - Technologies industrielles (TIN)
  - Technologies énergétiques (TE)
  - Technologies de l'Information et de la Communication (TIC)
- Master of Science HES-SO en Ingénierie du territoire
- Master UNIL-HES-SO in Nursing Sciences (MSc SI)
- Master UNIL-HES-SO in Health Sciences (MSc Sa)
- Master of Science HES-SO en Business Administration, with 3 possible orientations:
  - Entrepreneurship
  - Management des Systèmes d'information
  - Management et Ingénierie des services

== See also ==
- List of largest universities by enrollment in Switzerland
