= Kalaidos University of Applied Sciences =

University in Switzerland

- Motto in English: We place particular emphasis on customer orientation, practical relevance and quality.
- Type: Privately owned
- Established: 1997; 29 years ago
- Rector: José Gomez
- Total staff: 927
- Location: Zurich, Bern, Geneva, Lausanne, Switzerland; 47.415367°N 8.543868°E
- Website: www.kalaidos-fh.ch/de-CH

The Kalaidos University of Applied Sciences Switzerland (Kalaidos UAS) is a University of Applied Sciences in Switzerland with the departments of Business and Management, Law, Health, Music and Applied Psychology. It was founded in 1997 and today is one of ten accredited Swiss Universities of Applied Sciences, being the only privately owned one. It has 4’307 students, 150 employees, 1000 lecturers (as of December 31, 2024) and around 12’000 graduates. Kalaidos UAS is a foundation, which is a institutionally accredited University of Applied Sciences under Swiss law.

== History ==
Kalaidos UAS was founded in 1997 under the names "PHW Private Hochschule Wirtschaft” and “AKAD Hochschule für Berufstätige” as a monodisciplinary University of Applied Sciences with business degree programs. On April 6, 2005, the Swiss Federal Council granted the Kalaidos University of Applied Sciences Foundation approval to establish and operate the Kalaidos University of Applied Sciences. This approval is based on the Federal Law of October 6, 1995 on Universities of Applied Sciences and the Ordinance on Universities of Applied Sciences (FHSV) of September 11, 1996 and, in particular, on the results of a multi-year peer review process in which compliance with university standards at Kalaidos UAS was reviewed and confirmed. In 2013, the Federal Council decreed the federal accreditation of the University of Applied Sciences on the basis of the Higher Education Act (HEdA), which was passed in 2011 and came into force on January 1, 2015. The renewal of accreditation is due in 2021/2022. With this, the Federal Council confirms the recognition of Kalaidos UAS as a private University of Applied Sciences with several departments.

On 1 April 2025, a new structural and process organisation came into effect at Kalaidos University of Applied Sciences. It focuses on the fourfold mission of teaching, continuing education, services, and applied research and development. The organisation is primarily based on fields of activity: the field of teaching encompasses all degree programmes (bachelor's and master's programmes), while the field of continuing education and services covers continuing education and service offerings. Another key element of the reorganisation was the introduction of the Vice-Rectorate for Applied Research & Development. The previous departments have been reorganised into Schools that offer education and continuing education programmes and services and conduct research. In addition to the Kalaidos Business School, these include the Kalaidos School of Applied Psychology, the Kalaidos Law School and the Careum School of Health.

Kalaidos UAS is audited and supervised by the Swiss Accreditation Council on behalf of the federal government and, as a private university, receives no financial subsidies from the state. It is operated by the Kalaidos Education Group, which has been part of the Klett Group since 2019.

Kalaidos UAS is a member of Swissuniversities, the Rectors' Conference of Swiss Universities.

The word "Kalaidos" derives from the Greek language and means "beautiful image."

== Departments and Schools ==
Kalaidos UAS has five departments with part-time degree programs. Full-time study programs are not offered.

- The Department of Economics, with its Kalaidos Business School, offers various degree programmes in the field of business administration at the Institutes of Management and Leadership, Law and Taxes, and Distance Learning. In addition, there are numerous international collaborations with universities, companies, and educational partners from the fields of business, administration, and health.
- The Department of Health with the Kalaidos School of Health was established in 2006 and has undergone several restructurings since then. Today, various degree programmes and continuing education programs for nursing professions are offered.
- Kalaidos University of Music was founded in 2011.
- The Department of Law, Kalaidos Law School, offers a Bachelor and Master of Law as well as various advanced training courses in the field of law, such as tax law, value added tax, compliance, risk management, paralegal and labour and social security law.
- The Department of Applied Psychology with the Kalaidos School of Applied Psychology offers a Bachelor's degree programme and a consecutive Master's degree programme with two specialisations in business psychology and clinical psychology.

== Research ==
The mandatory performance mandate for Kalaidos University of Applied Sciences includes applied research and development. Consequently, the five departments have respective responsible research departments. The researchers are responsible for practical research and development and teach the research methods to the students.

== Alumni ==
- Sergey Belyavskyi, Pianist
- Laetitia Noemi Hahn, Pianist, taught by Grigory Gruzman
- Nuron Mukumi, Pianist

== See also ==
- Website of Kalaidos University of Applied Science (German)
- List of Swiss universities by enrollment
- Website der Alumni Kalaidos Fachhochschule (German)
- https://www.studyinswitzerland.plus/university/kalaidos-uas/
