= Bern University of Applied Sciences =

Vocational university in Switzerland

- Berner Fachhochschule
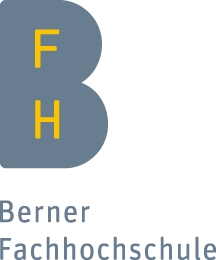
- Type: Public university
- Established: 1997; 29 years ago
- Affiliations: Swissuniversities European University Association
- Rector: Sebastian Wörwag
- Administrative staff: 2,482 (equivalent to 1,652 full-time) of which professors: 915 (equivalent to 580 full-time) (31 December 2019)
- Students: 7,188 (31 December 2019)
- Location: Bern, Biel, Burgdorf, Magglingen, Zollikofen, Switzerland; 47.1583°N 7.2772°E
- Website: http://www.bfh.ch/

The Bern University of Applied Sciences (BUAS, German: Berner Fachhochschule BFH, French: Haute école spécialisée bernoise HESB) is a public vocational university in Switzerland with a strong national and international profile. It comprises six departments and also incorporates the Higher Technical School of Wood, which is affiliated to the Department of Architecture, Wood and Civil Engineering.

== Locations ==
BFH is currently spread across 26 locations in Bern, Biel, Burgdorf, Magglingen and Zollikofen. In 2012, the Grand Council of the Canton of Bern decided to bring together the Department of Architecture, Wood and Civil Engineering and the Department of Engineering and Information Technology onto a single campus in Biel. The launch of the Biel/Bienne campus is scheduled for autumn 2023. The Health Professions, Social Work and Business departments and Bern University of the Arts will likely move to a shared campus in Bern in autumn 2026.

== Departments ==
The Departments of the Bern University of Applied Sciences include:

- Architecture, Wood and Civil Engineering
- Health Professions
- Business
- School of Agricultural, Forest and Food Sciences HAFL
- Bern University of the Arts
- Social Work
- Engineering and Information Technology
- Swiss Federal Institute of Sport Magglingen SFISM

As well as Bachelor and master's degree programmes, BFH offers continuing education, applied research and development and other services.

The sports, agriculture, forest science, automotive engineering, nutrition and dietetics, literary writing and medical informatics degree programmes are unique in German-speaking Switzerland or throughout the whole of Switzerland.

== Persons ==
- 1898–1938: Johann Friedrich Jungen (1873–1952), drawing teacher
- 1953–1993: Marc-André Houmard (1928–2014), Director of the wood technical school in Biel
- 2005–2017: Maurus Schifferli (* 1973), Lecturer for Urban Open Spaces
- Jonas Ulmer (* 1983), Architecture student
- 2006: Raphael Zuber (* 1973), Guest Lecturer in Architecture

== Growth ==
The following table shows how student numbers at the Bern University of Applied Sciences have grown since the university was founded in 1997.

Year^{1}	Bachelor studies	Master studies	Diploma programmes^{2}	Continuing education^{3}	Total
1997					800
2000					4190
2005			3893	940	4831
2006			4255	868	5123
2007	3454	62	256	557	4952
2008	3944	372	20	479	4935
2009	4835	663	32	593	5673
2010	4734	883	5	715	6337
2011	4938	975	0	506	6419
2012	5127	1100	0	497	6724
2013	5284	1090	0	401	6775
2014	5477	1121	0	559	7157
2015	5528	1136	0	151	6851
2016	5609	1255	0	179	7043
2017	5642	1249	0	203	7094
2018	5'689	1'281	0	220	7'190
2019	5'603	1'376	0	209	7'188

^{1} Figures as of 31 December
^{2} Degree programmes prior to the Bologna Reform (which introduced Bachelor/Master's degree programmes)
^{3} Only MAS/EMBA students (not including CAS/DAS students). From 2014 onwards, non-matriculated MAS/EMBA students are also included in the statistics for BFH's areas of activity.

== See also ==
- List of largest universities by enrollment in Switzerland
