= University of Applied Sciences of the Grisons =

University of applied sciences in Switzerland

- Type: Public university
- Established: 1963; 63 years ago
- Affiliation: Swissuniversities
- Rector: Jürg Kessler
- Total staff: 299 (2020)
- Students: 2313 (2020)
- Location: Chur, Switzerland
- Website: www.fhgr.ch

The University of Applied Sciences of the Grisons (formerly the Chur University of Applied Sciences HTW until September 3, 2019; German: Fachhochschule Graubünden) is a university of applied sciences in Switzerland, active in teaching, further education, research, and services. Since January 1, 2020, it has been an independent university of applied sciences.

== History ==
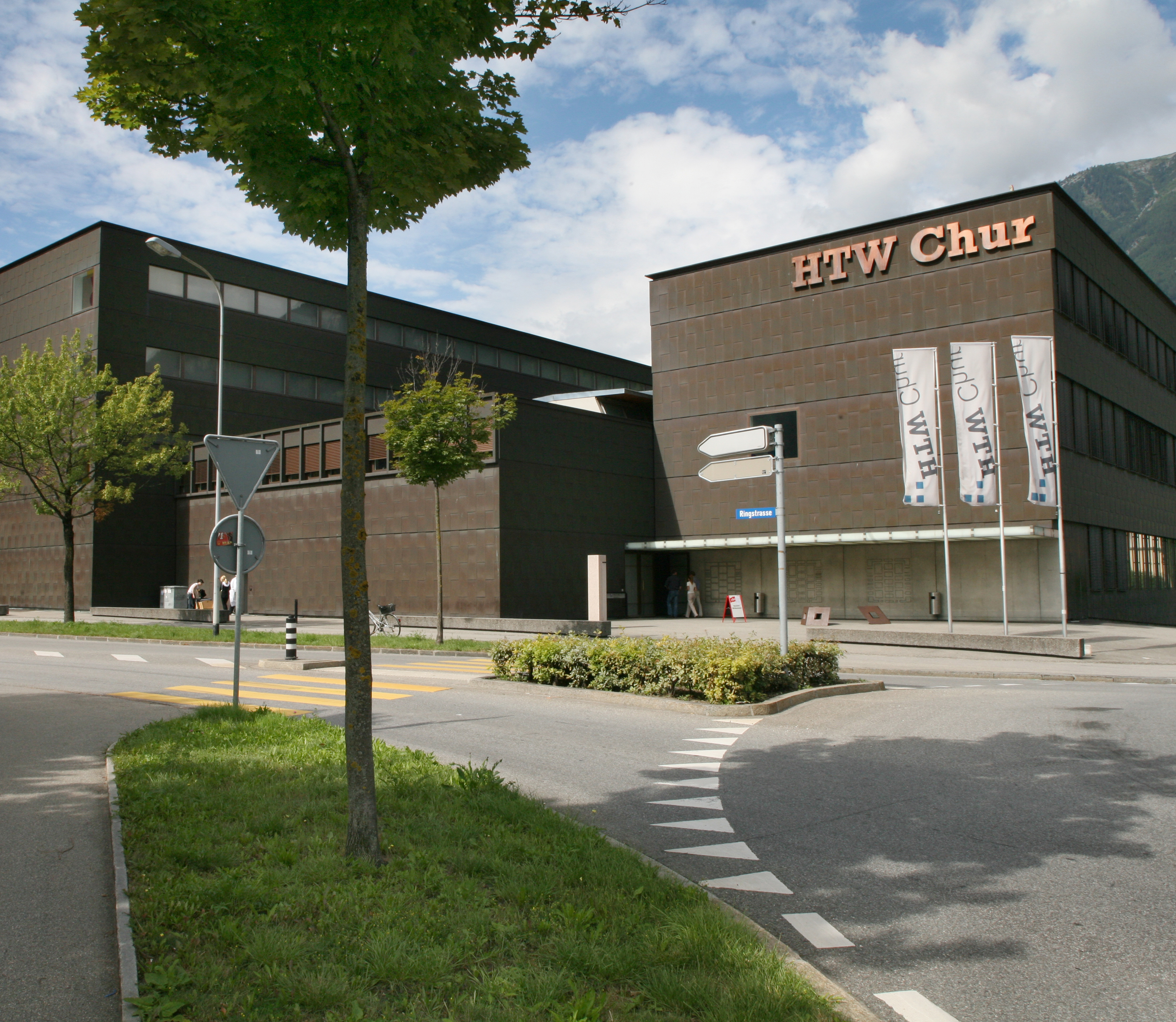
Location A

The University of Applied Sciences of the Grisons was founded in 1963 as the Evening Technical College Chur. In 1972, it was officially recognized as a Higher Technical Institute by federal decree. Several years later, they also introduced business-related study programs. The first full-time study programs were offered in 1990.

In 1991, the field of Business Administration established its own school, the University of Applied Sciences for Business and Administration (HWV), while the Higher Technical Institute, by then named the University of Technology and Architecture (HTA), was also in existence. In October 1997, both schools attained the status of a University of Applied Sciences.

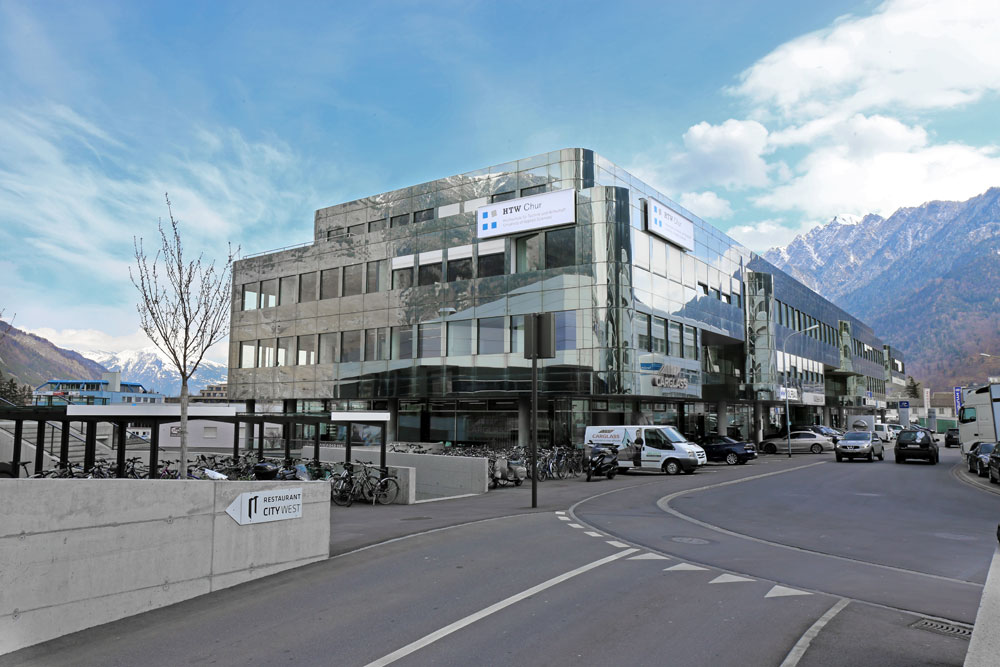
HTW Chur Standort E/F

With the establishment of seven University of Applied Sciences institutions in Switzerland in 2000, the areas of technology and business merged. This led to the creation of the University of Applied Sciences for Technology and Economics (HTW Chur), which was part of the University of Applied Sciences of Eastern Switzerland until the end of 2019.

As of January 1, 2020, the University of Applied Sciences of the Grisons became the eighth public University of Applied Sciences in Switzerland, receiving funding eligibility from the Federal Council. Consequently, it separated from the University of Applied Sciences of Eastern Switzerland. There are plans to build a university center in Chur by 2027, pending approval from the voting population of Grisons.

In August 2021, scientists at the University of Applied Sciences of the Grisons announced that they had calculated the number Pi to precisely 62.8 trillion digits, setting a world record at that time.

== Teaching and further education ==
The University of Applied Sciences of the Grisons offers bachelor's and master's degree programs as well as further education courses in architecture, civil engineering, Digital Science, management, multimedia production, technology, tourism, and digital supply chain management. The University of Applied Sciences of the Grisons has over 2000 students.

Development of student numbers
Year	Bachelor	Master	Further training	Total
2020	1780	156	377	2313
2019	1688	133	361	2182
2018	1567	127	363	2057
2017	1339	108	271	1718
2016	1181	101	313	1595
2015	1080	96	295	1471

== Architecture ==
The school building of the University of Applied Sciences of the Grisons – Location A was built in 1993 according to plans by the Chur architects Jüngling & Hagmann in collaboration with Branger & Conzett. Photographically, the school building was documented in 1993 by Christian Kerez and in 2019 by Ralph Feiner.

== Awards ==
1994: Auszeichnungen für gute Bauten Graubünden
