= Swiss Agency of Accreditation and Quality Assurance =

Swiss educational accreditation organization

Logo of Swiss Agency of Accreditation and Quality Assurance (AAQ)

Swiss Agency of Accreditation and Quality Assurance (AAQ) (formerly: Swiss Center of Accreditation and Quality Assurance in Higher Education or OAQ) (French: Organe d'accréditation et d'assurance qualité des hautes écoles suisses) is an organization that carries out institutional accreditation procedures in Swiss higher education institutions in accordance with the Federal Act on Funding and Coordination of the Higher Education Sector (HEdA).

AAQ is responsible for reviewing the quality of teaching and research in Swiss Universities, Swiss Universities of Applied Sciences and Swiss Universities of Teacher Education. It carries out quality assurance of education and internal services procedures. When accrediting an institution, AAQ follows the procedures in accordance with the guidelines approved by the Swiss University Conference (SUC).

== History ==
Founded in 2001, the OAQ was renamed Agency for Accreditation and Quality Assurance (AAQ), as a consequence of the entry into force of the Federal Act on Funding and Coordination of the Swiss Higher Education Sector (Higher Education Act, HEdA 414.20) on January 1, 2015.

- 2001: Official creation of the OAQ. OAQ was part of the Swiss Accreditation Council (SAR) which selected the director of the OAQ.
- 2006: OAQ was granted full membership of the European Association for Quality Assurance in Higher Education (ENQA) in December.
- 2007: Agreement on mutual recognition of accreditation results between the Commission des titres d'Ingénieur (CTI) and the Swiss Center of Accreditation and Quality Assurance in Higher Education (OAQ) is signed in Barcelona.
- 2011: ENQA's committee renews OAQ membership.
- 2015: OAQ is renamed AAQ.

== International recognition ==
AAQ is a member of the ENQA. The latest external review of the AAQ for the renewal of the agency's ENQA membership and renewal of EQAR registration was undertaken in November 2020.

It is part of the founding members of ECA and listed by the European Quality Assurance Register for Higher Education (EQAR).

== Standard procedure ==
OAQ's evaluation and accreditation procedures are made out of 3 main steps being Auto-evaluation, External evaluation and Publication.
