= Flintobox =

Indian toy manufacturing company

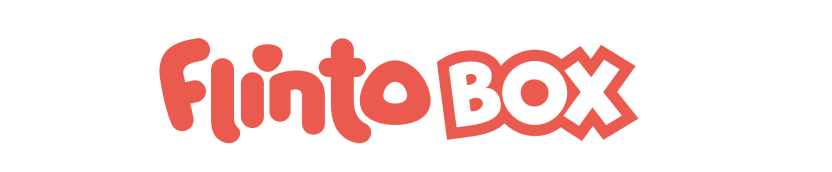
- Industry: Education Toys
- Founded: September 2013
- Founders: Arunprasad Durairaj, Vijaybabu Gandhi, Shreenidhi Srirangam
- Headquarters: Chennai, India
- Area served: India
- Products: Activity Boxes for Children
- Services: E-commerce Subscription Boxes
- Website: flintobox.com

Flintobox is an India-based company that produces STEAM-based educational activity boxes for children. Based on a new theme every month, Flintobox designs resources for Early Child Development. The company follows a subscription operational model and delivers the boxes straight to the child's doorstep.

== History ==
Flintobox was founded by Arunprasad Durairaj, Vijaybabu Gandhi, and Shreenidhi Srirangam. They are also the co-founders of Flintoclass. As young parents, they realised the growing trend of screen addiction in children and the urgent requirement for activities to get their children engaged with. The idea of Flintobox was then born. After a few test runs, they invested their savings of close to Rs. 10 lakh to establish the business in September 2013.

In October 2014, they raised US$300,000 from leading angels GSF Global, Globevestor (USA), AECAL (Germany), and Mauj Mobile. Mauj Mobile already owns three app platforms, namely, AppyStore, Gamesbond and Mobango. The investment primarily went into scaling marketing, operations, and product development capabilities. The company began operations with designing products for 4-8 year olds and is currently catering to 2-12 year olds.

The third and fourth round of funding was for Rs.2cr in 2015 and Rs.6.2cr in 2016 respectively, and was led by Ashwin Chadha - a leading Angel Investor, and Globevestor with participation from existing investors. In 2017, Series-A funding was done by Lightbox and they invested Rs.45cr along with existing investors. InnoVen Capital, Asia's leading venture debt and specialty lending firm, made a debt investment of INR 60 million in 2018. In 2020, Pre-Series B funding of $7.2 million, was led by Lightbox Ventures.

The name Flintobox originates from flint, a sedimentary rock, which can generate sparks when struck against steel.

== Membership ==
Flintobox offers three subscription plans, which customers can upgrade or cancel at any point of time. There are 3-month, 6-month, and 12-month subscriptions available. The company looks at teaching children several age-appropriate concepts and build 16 developmental skills over the period of their subscription. Currently, Flintobox has more than 10 lakh subscribers.

Subscribers of Flintobox also receive a digital feed of parenting tips, engaging activity ideas and downloadable worksheets to do with children through the Free Flintobox App.

== Product ==
Flintobox started off in 2013 with products for 4-8 year olds. Each box contains 3-4 play based activities that bring about overall development of the child. It is educational and is designed by child development experts to make learning more engaging and healthy for kids. Each month has a new theme based on which all the activities are designed. Flintobox has a tie-up with International Institute of Information Technology in Hyderabad to design developmental games that can help with a child's motor skills, creative thought process, and overall psychological development.

Flintobox targets at getting four main activities inside every box that makes a child create, explore, play, read, and sometimes a bonus activity is included.

In December 2015, Flintobox announced that it was expanding its product line to include products for children between the ages of 2-3 and 3–4. The new products have 3-5 activities inside each box. The boxes have toys themed around topics like wildlife, vegetables, coloring, outer space, numbers, and others - all aimed at 16 developmental needs in children. At the end of 2016, Flintobox began producing activity kits for 8-12 year olds that deals with everyday science concepts and experiments.

At present, Flintoboxes are shipped across India. The concepts are ideated and designed in-house, but manufacturing is generally done by suppliers. Bengaluru and Chennai contribute to over 30 percent of Flintobox's revenue.

== Promotion ==
Flintobox operates on a complete ecommerce model. There are no offline stores. Orders and purchases are made through the company's website and app.

== Awards and recognition ==
Flintobox was awarded the "Coolest Startup of 2014" by Business Today, the "Best Education Startup of 2014" by the Confederation of Indian Industries (CII), the Wharton India Startup Competition 2015 and also the best subscription boxes of 2014 by Kidstoppress. In 2017, it won the Best Start-Up award by TiECON Chennai. In 2018, it bagged three awards including Innovative Learning Solution by Global Edfest, Academics' Choice 'Brain Toy' Award, as well as Academics' Choice 'Mind Spring' award.
