= Nikil =

Nikil is a masculine given name. Notable people with this name include the following:

- Nikil Dutt, Indian academic
- Nikil Jayant (born 1945), Indian-American engineer
- Nikil Saval, American journalist
