= IEEE Transactions on Computer-Aided Design of Integrated Circuits and Systems =

- Discipline: Computer-aided design
- Language: English
- Edited by: Rajesh K. Gupta

Publication details
- History: 1982–present
- Publisher: Institute of Electrical and Electronics Engineers
- Frequency: Monthly
- Impact factor: 3.6 (2025)

Standard abbreviations
- ISO 4: IEEE Trans. Comput.-Aided Des. Integr. Circuits Syst.

Indexing
- CODEN: ITCSDI
- ISSN: 0278-0070 (print); 1937-4151 (web)
- LCCN: 82646745
- OCLC no.: 7677291

Links
- Journal homepage; Online archive

IEEE Transactions on Computer-Aided Design of Integrated Circuits and Systems (sometimes abbreviated IEEE TCAD or IEEE Transactions on CAD) is a monthly peer-reviewed scientific journal covering the design, analysis, and use of computer-aided design of integrated circuits and systems. It is published by the IEEE Circuits and Systems Society and the IEEE Council on Electronic Design Automation (Institute of Electrical and Electronics Engineers). The journal was established in 1982 and the editor-in-chief is Rajesh K. Gupta (University of California, San Diego). According to the Journal Citation Reports, the journal has a 2025 impact factor of 3.6.

== Past editors-in-chief ==
- Rajesh K. Gupta (2018–2022)
- Vijaykrishnan Narayanan (2014–2018)
- Sachin Sapatnekar (2010–2014)

== See also ==
- Electronic design automation
