= Sandeep Shukla =

Indian computer scientist

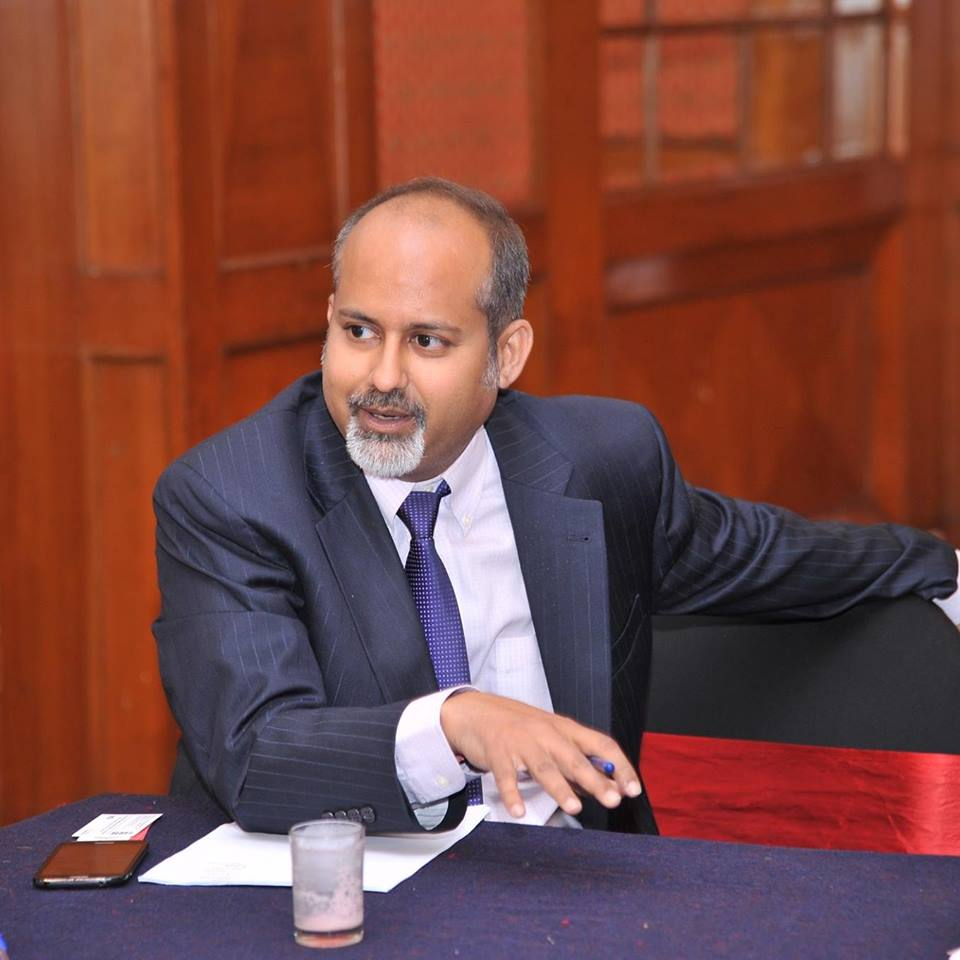
- Prof. Sandeep Shukla
- Born: India
- Known for: System security
- Awards: IEEE Fellow, ACM Distinguished Member
- Scientific career
- Institutions: Indian Institute of Technology, Kanpur
- Website: security.cse.iitk.ac.in/node/96

Sandeep Kumar Shukla is currently the director of International Institute of Information Technology, Hyderabad (IIITH). He took charge as the director of IIITH on 20 August 2025, succeeding Prof. P. J. Narayanan after a tenure of 12 years. Prof. Shukla was previously the Poonam and Prabhu Goel Chair Professor and previous head of Computer Science and Engineering Department, Indian Institute of Technology, Kanpur, India. He has been the Editor-in-Chief of ACM Transactions on Embedded Systems, and associate editor for ACM transactions on Cyber Physical Systems. Previously, he was also the joint director of C3i centre at IIT Kanpur along with Manindra Agrawal.

== Education ==
Shukla obtained his B.E. degree from Jadavpur University in 1991. After graduation, he immigrated to the United States where he attended University at Albany, SUNY for three years. There he was awarded an M.S. degree in 1995 and a Ph.D. in 1997.

== Career ==
He was a faculty member at Virginia Tech, Arlington, Virginia between 2002 and 2015.

== Awards and honors ==
In 2012, he was elected an ACM Distinguished Member. In 2014, he was named an IEEE Fellow "for contributions to applied probabilistic model checking for system design".

== Bibliography ==
- Nano, Quantum and Molecular Computing Implications to High Level Design and Validation, Springer Publishing, 2004, ISBN 9781402080685
- Formal Methods and Models for System Design A System Level Perspective, Springer Publishing, 2004, ISBN 9781402080524
- SystemC Kernel Extensions for Heterogeneous System Modeling A Framework for Multi-MoC Modeling & Simulation, Springer Publishing, 2004, ISBN 9781402080883
- Ingredients for Successful System Level Design Methodology, Springer Publishing, 2008, ISBN 9781402084720
- Fundamental Problems in Computing, Springer Publishing, 2009, ISBN 9781402096884
- Metamodeling-Driven IP Reuse for SoC Integration and Microprocessor Design, Artech House Publishing, 2009, ISBN 9781596934245
- Synthesis of Embedded Software, Springer Publishing, 2010, ISBN 9781441964007
- Low Power Hardware Synthesis from Concurrent Action-Oriented Specifications, Springer Publishing, 2010, ISBN 9781441964816
- Low Power Design with High-Level Power Estimation and Power-Aware Synthesis, Springer Publishing, 2012, ISBN 9781461408727
- Parallelizing High Level Synthesis, G. Singh, Sumit Gupta, Sandeep Shukla, Rajesh K. Gupta, The CRC Handbook of EDA for IC Design, Edited by Grant Martin, Luciano Lavagno, and Lou Scheffer
- An Introductory Survey of Networked Embedded Systems, H. Patel, Sumit Gupta, Sandeep Shukla, Rajesh K. Gupta, The Industrial Information Technology Handbook, edited by Richard Zurawski, CRC Press, 2003.
- Design Issues for Networked Embedded Systems, Sumit Gupta, H. Patel, Sandeep Shukla, Rajesh K. Gupta, The Embedded Systems Handbook
