= Luca Benini =

Computer scientist and educator

- Education: Stanford University (Ph.D., 1997); University of Bologna (Laurea, 1994)
- Occupations: Computer scientist and educator
- Scientific career
- Fields: Embedded system; Integrated circuit; Machine learning; Computer architecture
- Workplaces: ETH Zurich; University of Bologna
- Thesis: Automatic synthesis of sequential circuits for low power dissipation (1997)
- Doctoral advisor: Giovanni De Micheli; Teresa Meng

Luca Benini is a computer scientist who is a Professor of Electronics at University of Bologna and the Chair of Digital Circuits and Systems at ETH Zurich.

== Biography ==
Benini received Laurea in Electrical engineering from University of Bologna in 1994 and in 1997, he received his PhD on the same topic from Stanford University under the supervision of Giovanni De Micheli and Teresa Meng.

Benini has served as a Chief Architect of the Platform 2012 project at STMicroelectronics in Grenoble, France from 2009 to 2013.

He was awarded the Fellow of ACM (2016) for his contributions to the design of low power multi- processor systems. He also became a Fellow of the IEEE (2007) for his contributions to design technologies for low power design of integrated circuits and systems. Benini is also a member of HiPEAC.

In 2019, a team of researchers from ETH Zurich and the University of Bologna led by Benini developed a nano-drone named PULP Dronet, which is only few centimeters in diameter and light-weight, capable of operating indoors and outdoors. In 2019, Benini joined LowRISC C.I.C. as a board member and serves in the board of directors.

== Publications ==
=== Selected publications ===
- Benini, L., & De Micheli, G. (2002). Networks on chips: A new SoC paradigm. computer, 35(1), 70–78.
- Bertozzi, D., Jalabert, A., Murali, S., Tamhankar, R., Stergiou, S., Benini, L., & De Micheli, G. (2005). NoC synthesis flow for customized domain specific multiprocessor systems-on-chip. IEEE transactions on parallel and distributed systems, 16(2), 113–129.
- Benini, L., & De Micheli, G. (2000). System-level power optimization: techniques and tools. ACM Transactions on Design Automation of Electronic Systems (TODAES), 5(2), 115–192.
- Ye, T. T., De Micheli, G., & Benini, L. (2002, June). Analysis of power consumption on switch fabrics in network routers. In Proceedings of the 39th annual design automation conference (pp. 524–529).
- Bertozzi, D., & Benini, L. (2004). Xpipes: A network-on-chip architecture for gigascale systems-on-chip. IEEE circuits and systems magazine, 4(2), 18–31.
