= Nano-Tera =

Nano-Tera official banner

Nano-Tera.ch was a Swiss national research program launched in 2008 to promote applications of nanotechnology in areas such as health, security, and the environment. Created by the ETH Board and the Swiss University Conference on behalf of the Swiss federal government, the initiative aimed to consolidate Swiss research efforts in emerging technologies and improve national competitiveness. Federal officials described the program as a means to strengthen research capacity and anticipated private-sector participation.

The program concluded in 2017 after nine years of operation. It was supported by over CHF 120 million in federal funding and more than CHF 150 million from institutional and industry partners. One of its stated goals was to revitalize engineering research and education, particularly at Swiss universities.

A 2019 book published by Springer describes Nano-Tera.ch as a Swiss federal program that advanced system and device technologies in health, environment, and energy.

== Scope ==
The Nano-Tera.ch initiative aimed to develop new applications of nanotechnology in the areas of health, security, and the environment. The program sought to miniaturize sensors and devices using nanotechnology and microtechnology, while also enhancing their capacity to process large volumes of data. According to executive committee chair Giovanni De Micheli, the initiative also aimed to demonstrate the societal relevance of engineering, stating: “We would like to show that engineering is not just sitting behind a computer. It's about creating systems that can have an impact on society”.

Patrick Aebischer, then-president of the École Polytechnique Fédérale de Lausanne (EPFL), publicly described the program's aim as anticipating future technologies. He stated, “We want to anticipate what future products will be with this programme,” and noted that the initiative hoped to attract industrial partners through the potential for widespread product use.

The Nano-Tera.ch program also raised questions about the privacy implications of monitoring technologies. Boi Faltings, head of the artificial intelligence laboratory at EPFL, acknowledged these concerns, noting: “There are new technologies being developed that deal with data without revealing the source of that information. The aim is not to identify individuals, but to answer overall questions".

== Applied research ==
The Nano-Tera.ch program focused on three main application areas: wearable embedded systems, ambient systems, and remote systems. Wearable systems were designed to collect physiological data and interface with information networks, with applications in health monitoring, elderly support, and personal safety. Ambient systems aimed to integrate sensors and intelligence into buildings and the environment to support monitoring and interaction. Remote systems included the development of autonomous technologies such as nano-satellites, intended for environmental and disaster monitoring.

Several high-profile research projects emerged from Nano-Tera, including the following:

In 2012, researchers at ETH Zurich developed a compact infrared device capable of detecting tiny traces of cocaine in saliva. The project, created as part of the Nano-Tera.ch research initiative, responded to concerns that standard police roadside drug tests can produce “negative or preliminary positive results, which are sometimes wrong and not recognised by the courts.” ETH professor Markus Sigrist led a team working on an optical sensor to measure cocaine concentrations, with the aim of creating a platform that could be marketed by an industrial partner.

In 2013, EPFL researchers developed the IronIC chip, a miniature implantable device for real-time blood analysis. Funded by Nano-Tera.ch, it includes sensors, a radio transmitter, and an external power patch. Designed for uses such as monitoring chemotherapy patients and detecting drug levels, it transmits data via smartphone and showed reliability comparable to standard lab tests.

In 2017, Swiss researchers developed Envirobot, a robotic eel equipped with sensors to detect water pollution. Funded by the Nano-Tera.ch program, the project involved four institutions and demonstrated the robot's ability to map changes in water conductivity during tests in Lake Geneva.

== Research impact ==
Over its nine-year duration, Nano-Tera supported 127 research projects and 61 educational initiatives, involving over 1,600 participants from more than 40 Swiss research institutions. The program led to nearly 1,600 peer-reviewed publications and over 2,000 conference presentations. It trained more than 360 PhD students, who, as of 2019, were reported to be mainly active in the Swiss and European industrial landscape. Nano-Tera also resulted in 67 patent applications and received 77 awards.

== See also ==
- Science and technology in Switzerland
