= Nilam Sawhney =

Indian civil servant

Nilam Sawhney IAS
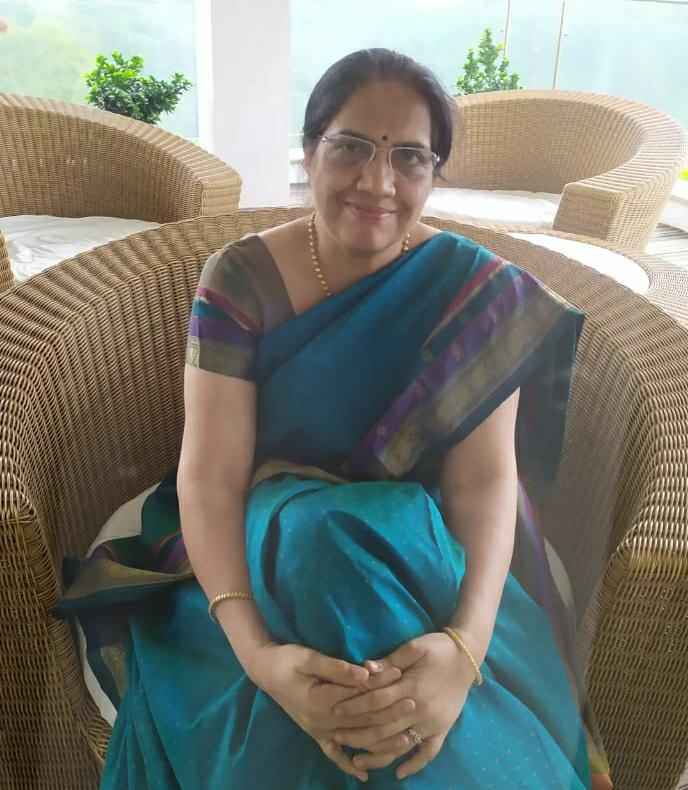

State Election Commissioner of Andhra Pradesh
- In office April 2021 – March 2026

Chief Secretary of Andhra Pradesh
- In office November 2019 – 1 January 2021

Secretary of Ministry of Social Justice and Empowerment
- In office May 2018 – November 2019

Secretary of Central Vigilance Commission
- In office May 2015 – May 2018

Personal details
- Born: 2 June 1960 (age 66)
- Spouse: Ajay Prakash Sawhney
- Occupation: IAS officer
- Profession: Civil servant

Nilam Sawhney (born 2 June 1960) is currently serving as chief election commissioner of Andhra Pradesh. She served as the first woman Chief Secretary of the newly formed state of Andhra Pradesh, India, from November 2019 to January 2021. She is a 1984 batch Indian Administrative Service (IAS) officer of Andhra Pradesh cadre. She previously held the position of Secretary of Union Ministry of Social Justice and Empowerment from 2018 to 2019 and before this served as the Secretary of Central Vigilance Commission in the Government of India from 2015 to 2018.

== Early life and education ==
Sawhney hails from New Delhi, India. She earned her Masters of Science Physics degree with first division from University of Delhi.

== Career ==
Sawhney has served in various key positions for both the Government of India and the Government of Andhra Pradesh.

=== Chief Secretary of Andhra Pradesh ===
Sawhney assumed office as the first woman Chief Secretary of Andhra Pradesh in November, 2019. She has since been known for her proactive style of governance and rapid implementation of policies aimed at social development of the state. She has aided the creation of major initiatives such as large scale revamping of the public health systems, creation of institutional transparency for pension schemes through e-governance and e-disbursement initiatives and creation of Rythu Bharosa Centres for agricultural amenities. As the Chief Secretary of the state during the COVID-19 crisis, she has thus far managed to maintain one of the highest per capita testing in the country in the state and large scale surveillance of symptoms in the population through five rounds of statewide door to door surveys and significant decentralisation and expansion of testing facilities to keep the pandemic in check.

=== Secretary of Union Ministry of Social Justice and Empowerment ===
Sawhney worked as secretary of Ministry of Social Justice and Empowerment from May 2018 to November 2019. While in office, she headed the group of secretaries for welfare setup by the honorable prime minister of India to drive policy framework creation towards focused goals on social welfare. She drafted policy aimed at ensuring basic human rights such as right to work with dignity and right to life for those economically and socially vulnerable classes who were pushed into or chose manual scavenging as a job, despite known dangers. Several programmes, policies and welfare measures, including the legislative and programmatic interventions, were introduced and implemented aimed at ending manual scavenging and providing alternate means of work during her tenure. During her stint as Secretary she also worked on policies aimed at eradicating AIDS, drug abuse and human trafficking in India proactively over the next decade through massive education, de-stigmatisation, drug rehabilitation and societal integration programs. During her term, the Ministry of Social Justice and Empowerment was also responsible for a paradigm shift in laws relating to reservation and preservation of equality in the country, with a shift in focus to economically weaker sections, pushing through a constitutional amendment to guarantee the reservation of 10% of public sector quotas for economically weaker sections of society.

=== Secretary of Central Vigilance Commission ===
Sawhney worked as Secretary of Central Vigilance Commission (CVC) from May 2015 to May 2018. As Secretary of CVC, she played a major role in streamlining the proceedings of graft and corruption charges, bringing down average times for pending cases to be completed by more than 2 years. Of note, was her work in strengthening current strategies while also re-balancing them at the same time from largely punitive deterrence focused systems to ones that focused more on preventive vigilance, through dedicated institutional mechanisms to identify and punish the corrupt necessarily complemented by the need to deter wrongdoing and for the inculcation of ethical values in order to ensure that individuals as well as organisations act with integrity. During her term, there was notable increase in the Commission's emphasis on the importance of preventive vigilance in government organisations as well as the public outreach and awareness initiatives of the commission.

=== Principal Secretary of Andhra Pradesh Department of Women & Child Development & Social Welfare ===
Sawhney joined the Department of Women & Child Development & Social Welfare, Government of Andhra Pradesh in February 2012 and served in this top post at the department till May 2015.

==== Child development and mothers` welfare ====
She focused on child health and emphasised the need to promote optimal infant and young child feeding practices in order to reduce malnutrition. She led awareness campaigns on the advantages of breastfeeding, malnutrition and anemia, leading to an improvement in infant and young child feeding indicators, as well as general health of women. Highlighting the issue of malnutrition among children during the first two years of life and permanence of the damage thus done, she led key interventions initiated at the state level under the integrated child development services which include addition of meaningful food models along with intensified health & nutrition education.

The following schemes were run by her department during her tenure as principal secretary:

- Introduction of acceptable fortified Take Home Ration for the children of 7 months to 3 years
- Supervised feeding of malnourished children - identification of malnourished child is based on measurement of weight for age as well as weight for height along with medical check-up of malnourished children.
- Introduction of one wholesome meal in the afternoon in place of Take Home Ration for pregnant and lactating mothers. In addition to full meal, eggs, milk and extra oil are also provided. Regular weight monitoring and supervised administration of IFA are ensured for pregnant women. This effort also helped in increasing fetal weight and hence better outcome at birth.
- Capacity building on skilled infant and young child feeding counseling through counseling courses.
- In place of one Nutrition and Health Day per month, two are being conducted. One is exclusively for growth monitoring of children and pregnant women and the other is for other health services

Sawhney also pushed for India wide adoption of certain key recommendations which yielded good results in the State, such as organising two Nutrition and Health days and having convergence at the grass roots level and further emphasised on the institutionalisation of the convergence actions at the grassroots level during her tenure.

=== Vice Chairman and Managing Director of Andhra Pradesh Industrial Development Cooperation ===
Sawhney served as the Vice Chairman And Managing Director of Andhra Pradesh Industrial Development Cooperation, Government of Andhra Pradesh from June 2011- February 2012.

=== Joint Secretary of Union Ministry of Rural Development ===
Sawhney served as the Joint Secretary at Union Ministry of Rural Development for five years from August 2005 to August 2010. During this term she also had the opportunity to be a member of the committee in the working groups for the eleventh five-year plan (2007-2012) for Social Protection Policy and the National Social Assistance Programme and Associated Programme, setup by the planning commission of India. Of particular note was her role in guiding the world's largest public housing project (by number of houses built from 1985 to 2020) under the Indira Awaas Yojana (IAY) (later run as Pradhan Mantri Awas Yojana), with more than 9 million houses (pukka) permanent settlements - modern houses built under IAY scheme from 2005 to 2010 alone during her tenure and more than 30 million built till 2020 (under IAY from 1985 to 2015 and PMAY from 2015 to 2020).

She also played a major role in kick-starting one of the largest direct social benefits schemes in the world under the umbrella of The National Social Assistance Programme divided into five parts—the Indira Gandhi National Old Age Pension Scheme, the Indira Gandhi National Widow Pension Scheme, the Indira Gandhi National Disability Pension Scheme, the National Family Benefit Scheme and the Annapurna scheme in which below poverty line families without breadwinners get wheat and rice. During her term as Joint Secretary, successful running and expansion of these schemes while facing the twin challenges of wading through red tape in bureaucracy and lackluster implementation brought these schemes to international recognition as well as catapulting the stories of implementation hurdles and challenges in the naxalism affected areas across India into limelight.
