= Swiss Federal Laboratories for Materials Science and Technology =

Swiss federal research institute

Coordinates: 47.4022°N 8.6113°E

The Swiss Federal Laboratories for Materials Science and Technology (Empa; German: Eidgenössische Materialprüfungs- und Forschungsanstalt, French: Laboratoire fédéral d’essai des matériaux et de recherche, Italian: Laboratorio federale di prova dei materiali e di ricerca, Romansh: Institut federal da controlla da material e da perscrutaziun,) is a Swiss research institution for application-oriented materials science and technology. It has three locations – Dübendorf, St. Gallen and Thun. As part of the ETH Domain, it is assigned to the Federal Department of Economic Affairs, Education and Research (EAER). For more than 100 years since its foundation in 1880, Empa has been a material testing institute. Since the late 1980s, it has increasingly transformed into an interdisciplinary research institute for materials and technologies.

== Research ==
Under the vision “Materials and Technologies for a Sustainable Future”, Empa has set itself the goal of developing solutions to priority problems facing industry and society, for example in the areas of energy, the environment, mobility, health and safety. In doing so, it is guided by the UN's Sustainable Development Goals and the needs of Swiss industry and society. Its research focus areas are nano-structured materials and technologies, the built environment, energy, resources and emissions, and health and performance.

The change from materials testing to research institution is also reflected in the name: Since 1988, Empa has officially been called the Swiss Federal Laboratories for Materials Testing and Research. Since 2001, the change in strategy has become increasingly visible: the number of scientific publications rose from 67 in 2001 to around 870 in 2022. The number of projects funded by the Swiss National Science Foundation (SNSF) increased from 5 to over 100 during the same period, the number of doctoral students from 16 to more than 280; in addition, there are more than 230 bachelor and master students and interns. Third party funding also increased, from 34 million Swiss francs in 2000 to more than 60 million Swiss francs (2022), of which 49 million Swiss francs were raised through research proposals and nearly 11 million Swiss francs through services and consulting. Empa is currently involved in 76 ongoing projects of the EU framework programs and almost 90 projects of Innosuisse, the Swiss agency for innovation promotion. The annual budget in 2022 was around CHF 107 million in direct federal funding and more than CHF 60 million in acquired third party funding.

Empa's activities focus on application-oriented research and development, often in close partnership with industrial partners. This is also expressed in its slogan: “Empa - The Place where Innovation Starts”. Empa pursues a multidisciplinary approach - scientists and engineers from numerous disciplines work together on most projects. It also supports the two Swiss Federal Institutes (ETH) in Zurich and EPFL in Lausanne, as well as Swiss universities and universities of applied sciences, in their teaching activities and is involved in organizing scientific conferences and training and further education events through the Empa Academy. Conferences, lecture series, seminars and teaching events are aimed at scientists, experts from industry and business, but also at the general public, for example in the wissen2go event series.

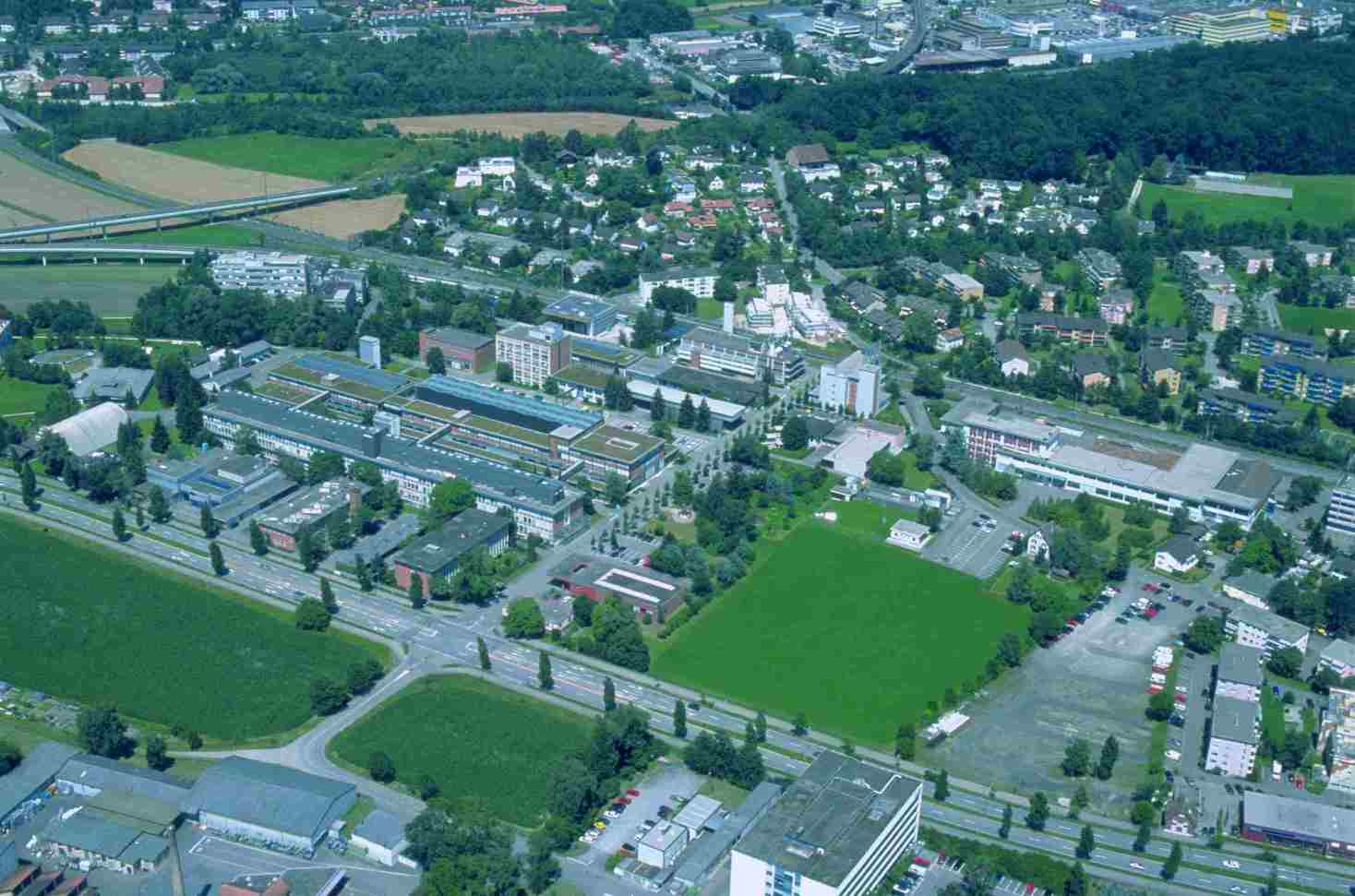
Empa premises in Dübendorf near Zurich

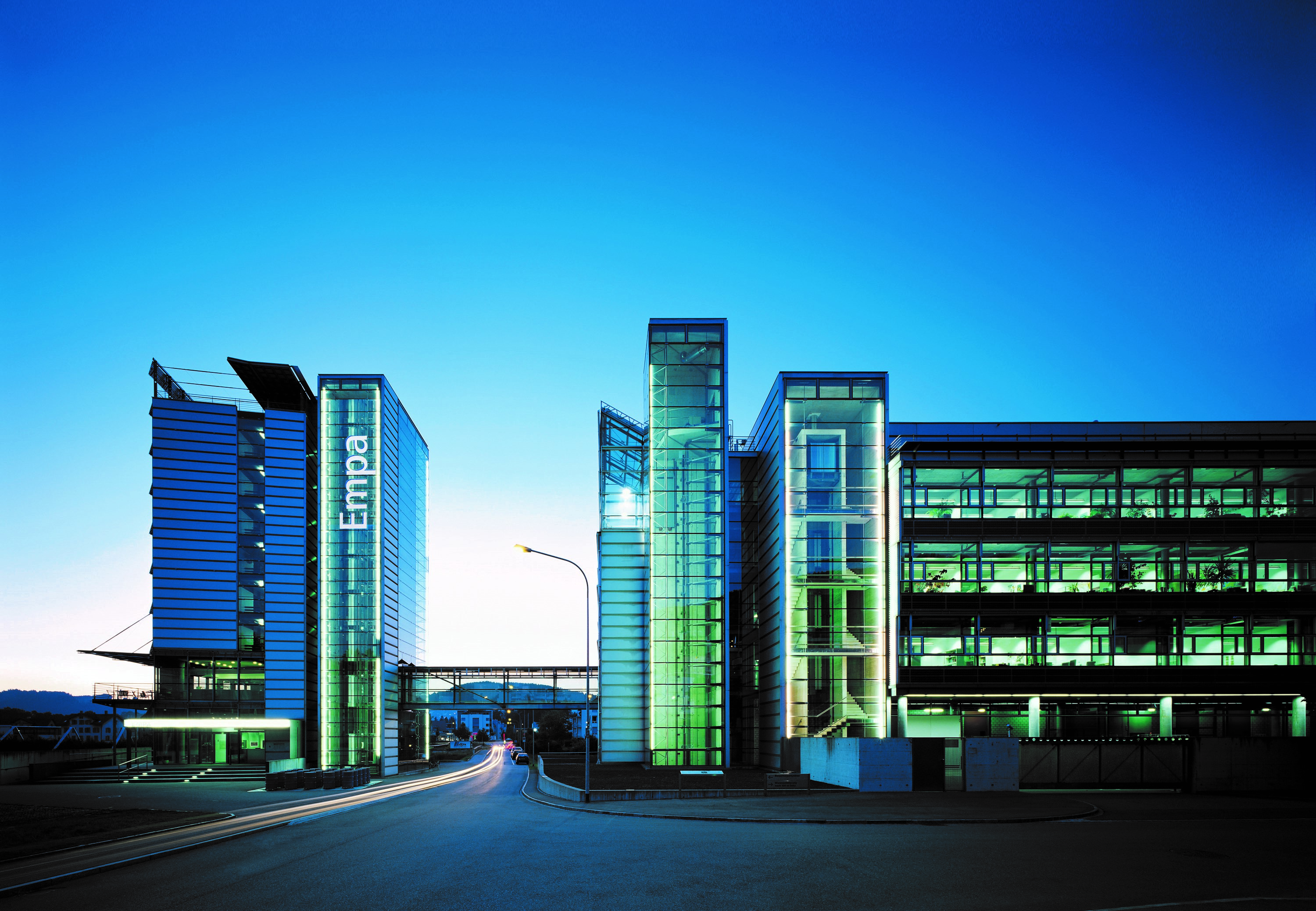
Empa premises in St. Gallen

== Directors ==
Term of office	Director
1880-1901	Ludwig von Tetmajer
1901-1924	François Schüle
1924-1949	Mirko Roš
1949-1969	Eduard Amstutz
1969-1988	Theodor H. Erismann
1989-2001	Fritz Eggimann
2001-2009	Louis Schlappbach
2009-2022	Gian-Luca Bona
since June 2022	Tanja Zimmermann

== History ==
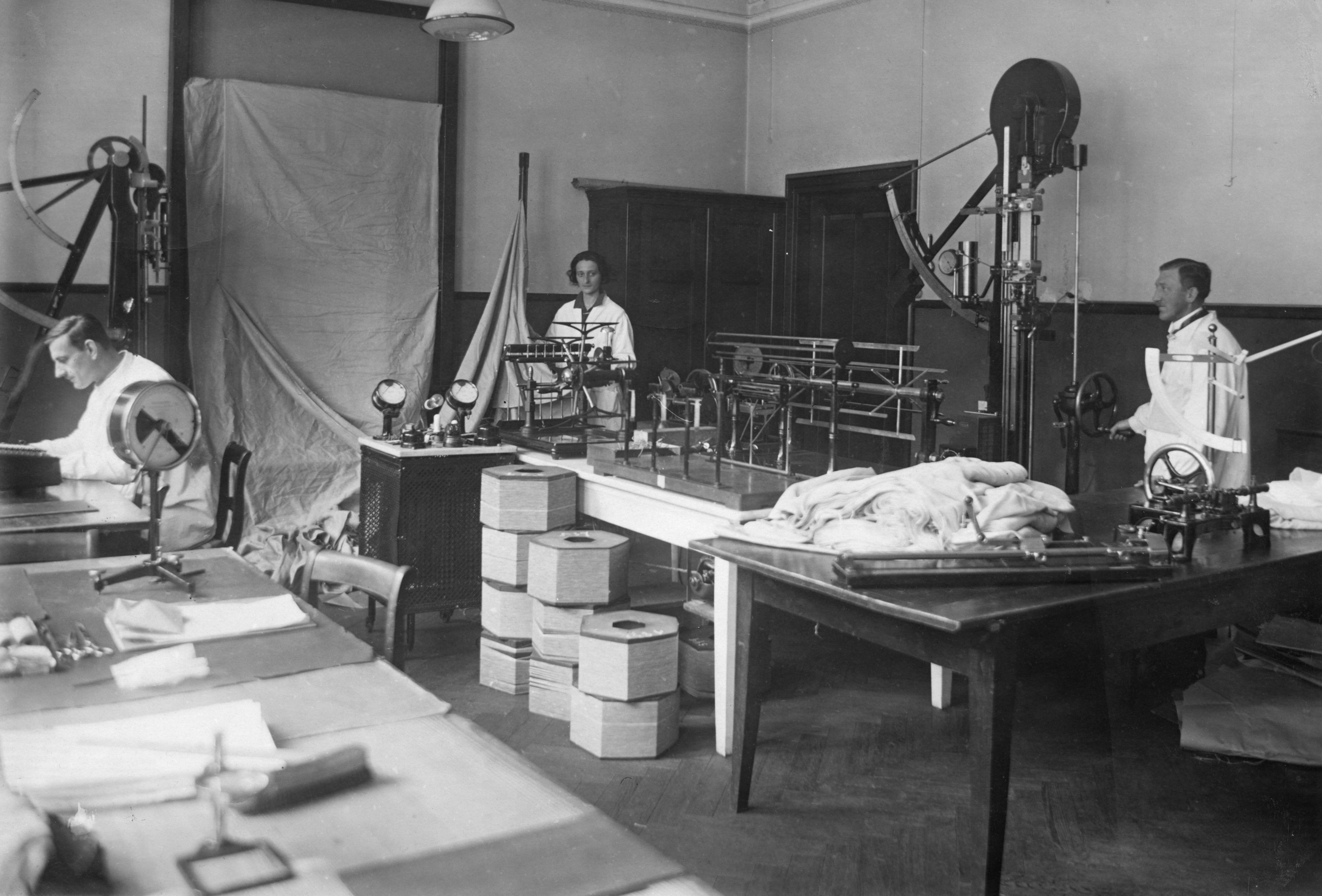
Laboratory of the Swiss Experimental Station in St. Gallen, approx. 1930

In 1880, the Institute for the Testing of Building Materials began its activities. Ludwig von Tetmajer, professor of building materials science, was its first director. It is housed in the Polytechnic in Zurich (today's ETH Zurich).

In 1891, Tetmajer was commissioned to clarify the cause of the collapse of the Münchenstein rail bridge built by Gustave Eiffel. In a short time, he succeeded in showing that Euler's hyperbola, which had been used until then, could only be used in the elastic range of the steel under discussion.

In 1895, the name Swiss Federal Laboratories for Materials Testing was used for the first time.

In 1937, the Swiss Textile Testing Institute in St. Gallen, which had been expanded in 1911, was added. Empa was given a new name: Swiss Federal Laboratories for Materials Testing and Research for Industry, Building and Commerce.

In 1962, Empa moved from Zurich to the suburb of Dübendorf. The focus there is on structural and civil engineering, safety engineering, surface technology, metallic materials, material composites, non-destructive testing, chemical analyses, exhaust gas and outdoor air testing, building services, building physics, acoustics and noise abatement.

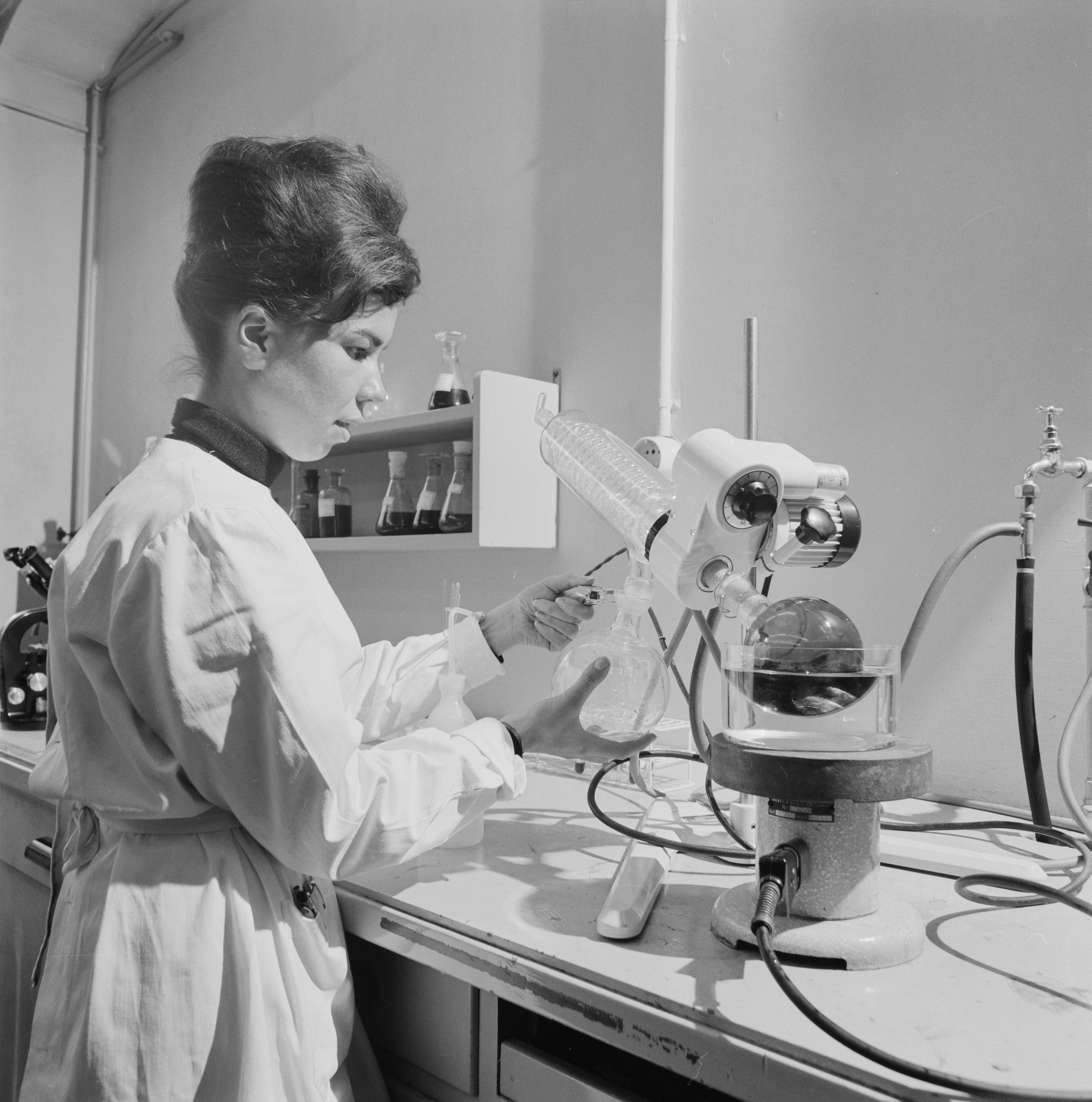
Employee of Empa in St. Gallen, 1964

1988 marked a change in the direction of research. From then on, Empa was called the Swiss Federal Laboratories for Materials Testing and Research.

In 1996, Empa moved into the new building Im Moos at the St. Gallen site. Its activities focus on clothing physiology, personal protection systems, functional fibers and textiles, biocompatible materials, material and image modeling, and technology risk assessments.

In 2001, Empa focused even more strongly on research and innovative developments; however, knowledge transfer and services remained an important part of the portfolio. An international research commission is set up to evaluate Empa's research activities at regular intervals.

In 2003, nanotechnology came to Empa. The new nanotech@surfaces laboratory works on nanostructures, nanotubes as electron sources, and quasicrystalline layers. In Dübendorf, the Functional Polymers department was created.

2004, another new laboratory was established in Dübendorf: Nanoscale Materials Science. It focuses on the development and analysis of nanostructured surfaces and coatings.

In 2005, Empa founded the International PhD School Switzerland – Poland together with the Warsaw University of Technology and the AGH University of Science and Technology in Krakow. This cooperation with the new EU member states has intensified within the framework of the so-called “cohesion billion”, Switzerland's contribution to the EU's eastward expansion, for example through numerous joint research projects and joint events such as the Swiss-Polish Science & Technology Days, which were held in Warsaw for the first time in 2010.

Also in 2005, Empa celebrated its 125th anniversary together with 13,000 visitors under the motto “Research that inspires”.

In 2008, Empa founded the business incubator glaTec in Dübendorf, which is intended to promote and support the establishment of innovative start-up companies in the Empa environment. It is the counterpart to “tebo”, which has existed at Empa in St. Gallen since 1996. Empa also significantly expanded its activities in photovoltaics. In addition, international cooperation with the world's leading materials research institutes was expanded through the establishment of WMRIF (World Materials Research Institute Forum), including the Japanese National Institute for Materials Science (NIMS), the US National Labs and various EU materials research laboratories.

In 2010, Empa agreed new partnerships with various industrial partners in the areas of fuel cells, medtech applications and sustainable mobility concepts. In addition, activities within five “Research Focus Areas” were aligned even more stringently with Empa's core task of translating research and technology into marketable innovations.

In 2011 and 2012, Empa participated extremely successfully with almost 25 projects in the special measures against the strength of the Swiss franc financed by the Commission for Technology and Innovation (CTI) – now Innosuisse – which are intended to strengthen the innovative power and thus the competitiveness of Swiss companies.

In 2014, the Swiss government initiated a priority program to promote energy research; eight different competence centers (Swiss Competence Centers for Energy Research, SCCER) are to better network Swiss universities and research institutions in the field of energy research and promote synergies. Empa has taken on the leadership of one of these eight centers as a “Leading House” in the field of Future Energy-Efficient Buildings & Districts (FEEB&D), with the aim of reducing the energy consumption of the Swiss building stock by a factor of five by the year 2050.

In 2014, the groundbreaking ceremony was held for NEST, a building concept designed to accelerate the transfer of new materials and technologies and bring products in the construction and energy sectors to market more quickly. Empa operates the research and innovation building jointly with Eawag. NEST consists of a central backbone and three open platforms on which individual research and innovation modules — so-called “units” — are installed according to a plug and play principle. After the creation of the "backbone" of the NEST by 2015, construction on the first modules could begin. On May 23, 2016, the building was opened with two modules already installed. In subsequent years, additional units were steadily added; by the end of 2022, eight modules were in operation. Each of these building modules was realized together with research and industry partners. On the research side, ETH Zurich, EPF Lausanne, Lucerne University of Applied Sciences and Arts, and Karlsruhe Institute of Technology (KIT), for example, have used the NEST platform to date. The thematic focus of most of the units is on resource and energy efficiency — be it with cycle-compatible concepts and materials, with new (intelligent) energy concepts, or with new digital planning and construction methods that optimize the use of materials.

Another demonstration and technology transfer platform in the mobility sector was presented back in 2015: move. This makes it possible to develop mobility concepts without fossil fuels and to test them in practice — from electromobility to hydrogen and synthetic fuels. The energy source is electricity from photovoltaic systems or hydroelectric power plants that fluctuates greatly over time and is not needed in the grid. This is then converted by the electrolysis of water first into hydrogen and in a further step into methane (power-to-gas concept).

As part of the opening of NEST, a third demonstration platform, the ehub (Energy Hub), went into operation in 2016. As a kind of control center, the ehub coordinates and controls the energy flows between NEST and move with the various energy users and sources and thus simultaneously connects the mobility sector with the building sector (so-called sector coupling). The ehub is thus intended to ensure an optimized energy supply, especially under the sign of temporally highly fluctuating energy sources such as solar and wind power. Therefore, the platform also has intermediate storage and conversion technologies for the different energy sources.

In 2016, Empa opened its Coating Competence Center, where tailor-made surface technologies and advanced manufacturing (AM) processes are to find their way from the research laboratories to marketable industrial applications. The center houses diverse coating facilities for hard coatings, flexible photovoltaics and organic electronics, as well as 3D printers for metallic materials and biocomposites. The facilities are close to industry in terms of process technology, but have modifications that allow researchers to perform detailed process analysis. The aim is to facilitate thereby the upscaling of new technologies and processes for Swiss industry.

With very similar objectives, the ETH Domain launched the strategic research area “advanced manufacturing (AM)” in 2017 under the leadership of Empa, which is intended to support Swiss industry in specifically exploiting the potential of digitalization and developing AM technologies. This gave rise in 2019 to the AM-TTC Alliance, the umbrella organization of Swiss technology transfer centers in the field of AM. The first such center to emerge in 2019 was the Swiss m4m Center in Bettlach, which develops processes for manufacturing 3D-printed implants in collaboration with the medtech sector. At the beginning of 2023, the network comprised three more TT centers.

Also in 2019, Empa stepped up its research activities in the battery sector and, among other things, entered into a strategic partnership with the Fraunhofer Society to create the basis for a production-ready next generation of traction batteries for electric cars.

In the same year, the Sustainability Robotics Lab was established at Empa in Dübendorf in cooperation with Imperial College London to develop novel materials for robotic systems used in environmental monitoring and in the maintenance of infrastructures that are difficult to access.

In 2021, the national innovation platform Switzerland Innovation included the Innovation Park East, right next to the Empa site in St. Gallen, in its network. In 2022, Empa's start-up incubator, Startfeld, merged with Innovation Park East. In Dübendorf, Empa has laid the foundation stone for its new research campus co-operate, which is consistently geared to minimizing greenhouse gas emissions.

Also in 2022, Empa strengthened and expanded its research activities in the field of quantum technology, including a grant of 15 million Swiss francs from the Werner Siemens Foundation to develop further carbon nanomaterials for future quantum technologies. Also in 2022, Empa decided to concentrate its research activities in four main research areas in the future

- Nanoscale Materials and Manufacturing Technologies
- Built Environment
- Health
- Energy, Resources and Emissions

In 2023 started the project Mining the Atmosphere that tries to find industrial applications for the captured atmospheric CO2

In 2025, Empa’s Concrete and Asphalt Laboratory won the Building Award for developing innovative concrete incorporating biochar-based carbon pellets that replace conventional aggregates. The technology could enable carbon-neutral or carbon-negative concrete while maintaining performance, offering a promising approach to reducing construction-sector emissions.

== See also ==
- Science and technology in Switzerland
- NaOH Summer winter heat storage

=== Associated institutions ===
- Swiss National Supercomputing Centre
- Eawag
- Paul Scherrer Institute
