= Ajay Prakash Sawhney =

Indian civil servant

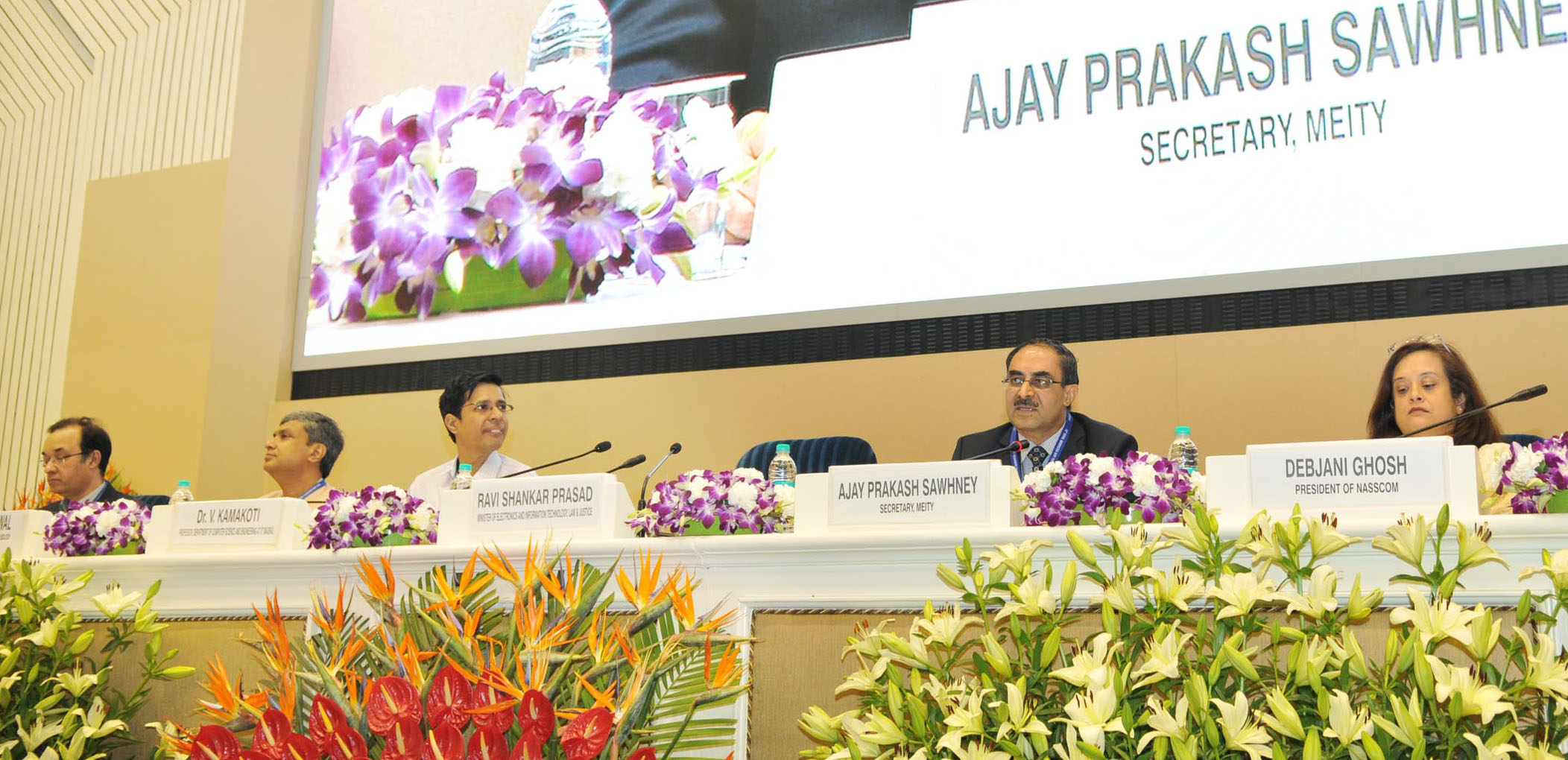
- Shri Ajay Prakash Sawhney speaking at the Plenary Session on "Artificial Intelligence for Effective Governance"

Secretary to the Government of India, Ministry of Electronics and Information Technology
- Preceded by: Aruna Sundararajan
- Succeeded by: Alkesh Kumar Sharma ,IAS officer

Personal details
- Born: 4 February 1962 (age 64)Delhi, India
- Spouse: Nilam Sawhney
- Occupation: Retd.IAS officer
- Profession: Civil servant

Ajay Prakash Sawhney (born 4 February 1962) is a retired 1984 batch Indian Administrative Service (IAS) officer of Andhra Pradesh cadre. He has served as the Secretary to the Government of India, at the Ministry of Electronics and Information Technology.

== Education ==
Mr. Ajay Sawhney studied Engineering in the Indian Railways Institute of Mechanical & Electrical Engineering (IRIMEE)

== Career ==
Sawhney has served in various key positions for both the Government of India and the governments of his cadre. Between 1999 and 2005, as Special officer for IIIT Hyderabad and Secretary IT for the state government, Ajay Prakash Sawhney came to the limelight through his success in shaping the conceptual model and development of IIIT Hyderabad. As secretary, IT, at Department of Information Technology in the Andhra Pradesh State Government, he was also credited for roping in large amounts of investment from firms such as Microsoft, Wipro, TCS leading up to an era of unprecedented growth in the IT infrastructure of Hyderabad. During the period 2010 to 2012, when Ajay was appointed the CEO of the National e-Governance Division, he laid the initial groundwork for building the Aadhaar card system and also integrating digital payments in government portals and schemes such as BHIM and UPI. He was on also given the additional charge of the post of Secretary, Department of Telecommunications till 14 October 2018.

=== Secretary -IT ===
Ajay Sawhney was appointed as the Secretary to the Government of India - Ministry of Electronics and Information Technology. His work on National Policy on electronics was a starting stone for Electronics reforms in this sector. He has been vocal about right usage of social media channels in India. His initial work in 2010-2012 as the CEO of the national e-governance programme had served as the starting point for formulation of the Aadhar card system and digital payments in government portals and schemes. As Secretary to the Government of India - Ministry of Electronics and Information Technology, he has formulated policies that have led to exponential growth in digital payments in India. He has widely been credited for playing a major role in easing policy and encouraging the digital India initiative and the make in India initiative through policy reform, this has helped transform India into an electronics manufacturing hub for the largest mobile and consumer electronics companies of the world.
