= Tanja Zimmermann =

Swiss professor and wood scientist (born in 1967)

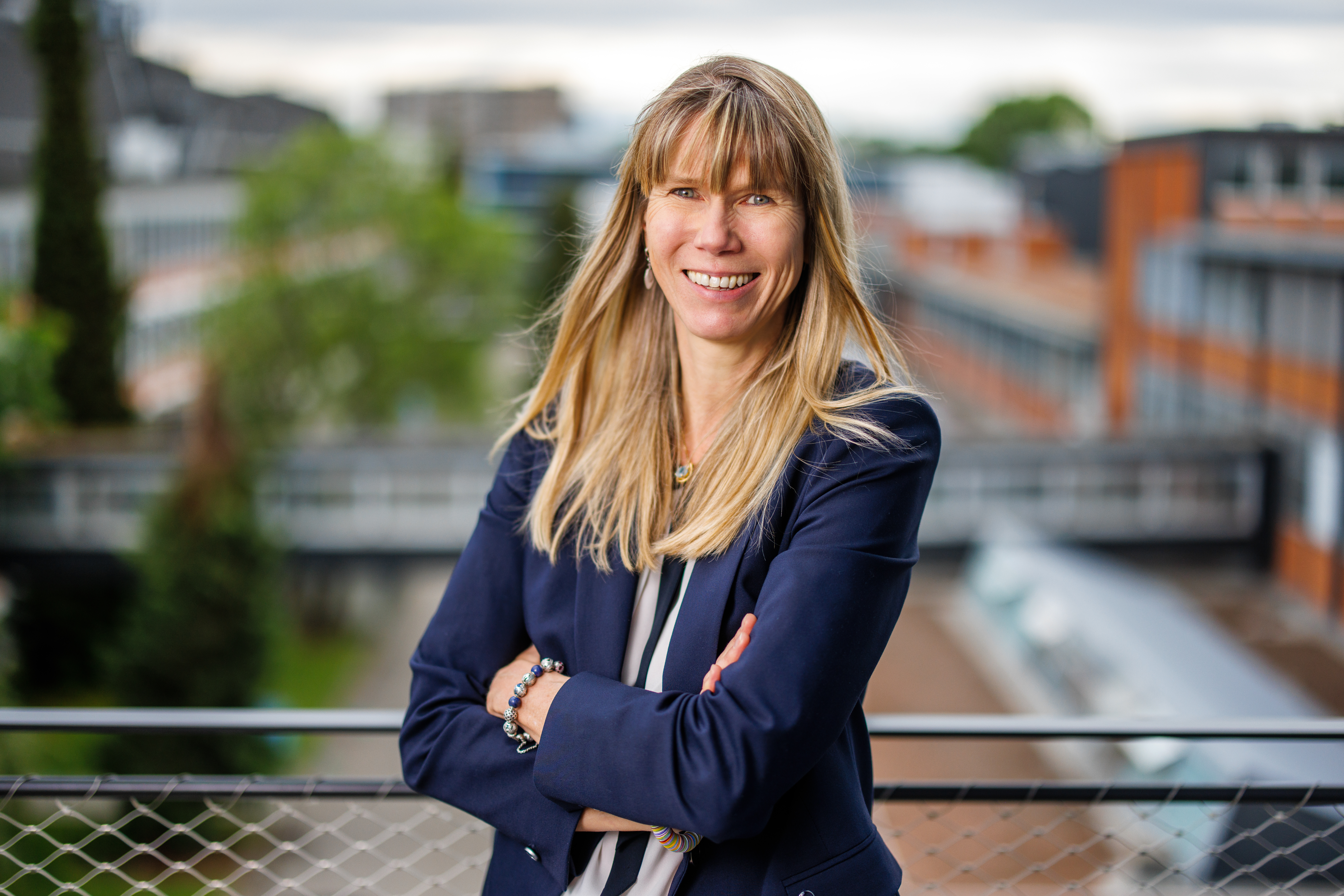
- Born: August 10, 1967 (age 59); Hamburg
- Education: University of Hamburg
- Occupations: EMPA Director; researcher; educator; materials scientist; wood scientist
- Years active: Since 1992

Tanja Zimmermann (born August 10, 1967) is a Swiss materials scientist and wood researcher, professor of materials science and technology at the School of Engineering at EPFL and the Department of Materials at ETH Zurich, who is an elected fellow (FIAWS) of the International Academy of Wood Science.

Since 2022, Zimmermann serves as the director of the Swiss Federal Laboratories for Materials Science and Technology (EMPA) in Switzerland. On 28 January 2026, she was re-elected as EMPA director for the term 2026-2030.

== Biography ==
Zimmermann was born in 1967 in Hamburg.

She pursued her studies in wood science and technology at the University of Hamburg in the years 1987–1992. She completed her MSc at EMPA, working upon the analysis and characterization of the surfaces of spruce wood. In the years 1994-2000, she worked as a research scientist at the wood department of Empa. During the period 2002-2006, she did her PhD studies on cellulose-based materials at Empa, in collaboration with the University of Hamburg.

Between 2010 and 2022, she served as the head of the Functional Materials Department, serving also as a co-head at the Research Focus Area Sustainable Built Environment at EMPA. Her research interests are focused on functionalised wood, cellulose-based materials with upgraded properties, and in addition, on adhesives and biodegradable products for sensor and energy uses.

She possesses over 100 publications in scientific journals, in the research area of wood science and technology. She has more than 8,000 international citations at Google Scholar.

In cooperation with her team members, Zimmermann has won several innovation awards, like the "Swiss Green Economy Symposium Award," the "Cadre d’Or" from Baukader Schweiz for the achievements in wood construction, and an award for the best innovative environmental technology at the Pollutec exhibition in Lyon.

== Recognition ==
- Fellowship, The International Academy of Wood Science (2010)
- SDG Award 2020, Swiss Green Economy (2020)
- Elected director of EMPA (2022)
