= Science and technology in Switzerland =

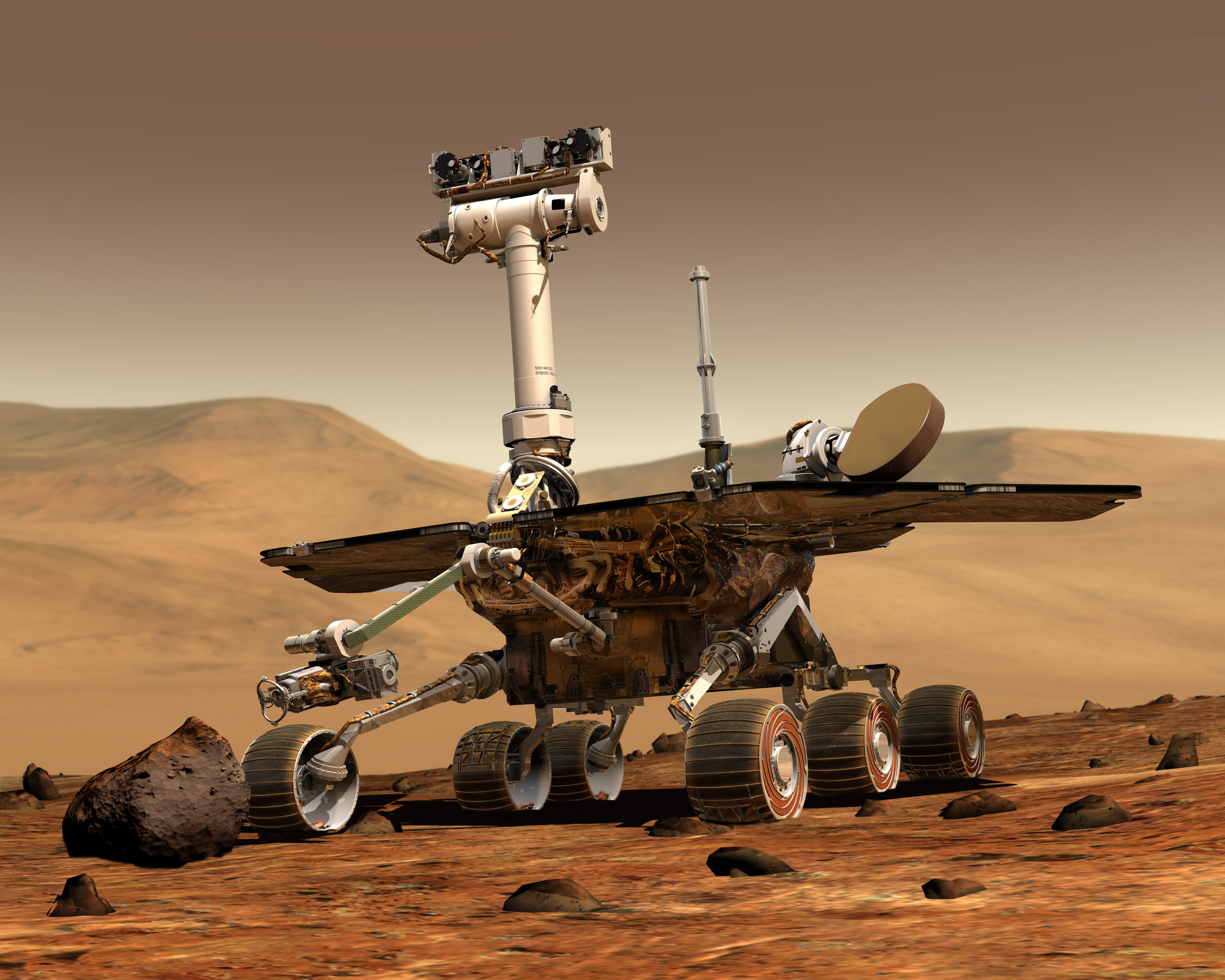
The still active NASA's Mars Exploration Rovers are powered by Swiss-built motors.

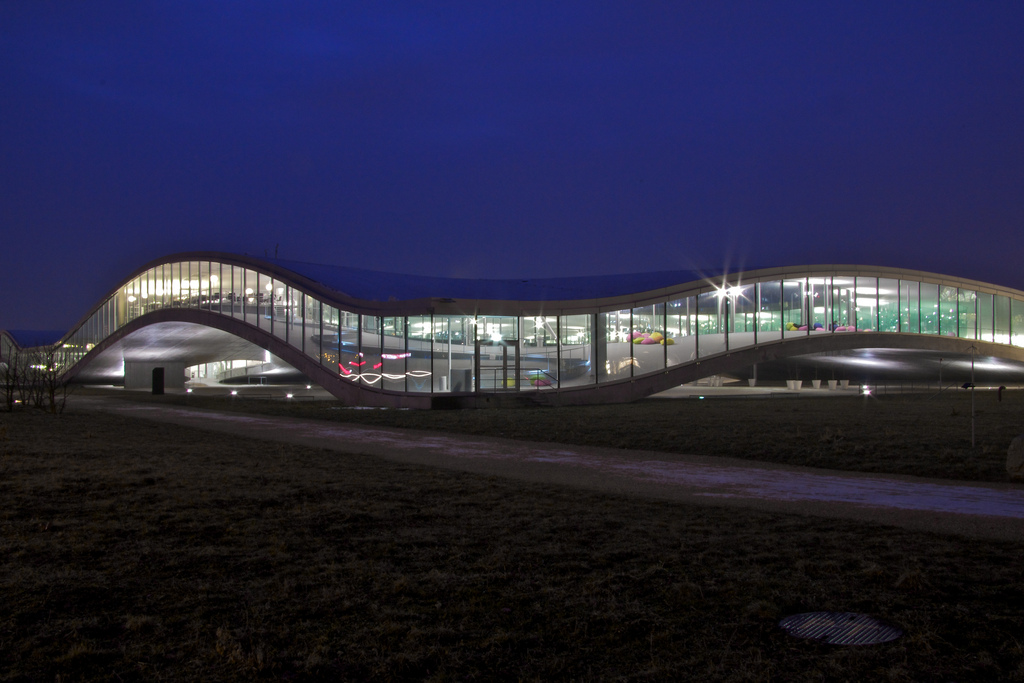
The Learning Center of the École Polytechnique Fédérale de Lausanne (EPFL). A famous building of the Lausanne campus.

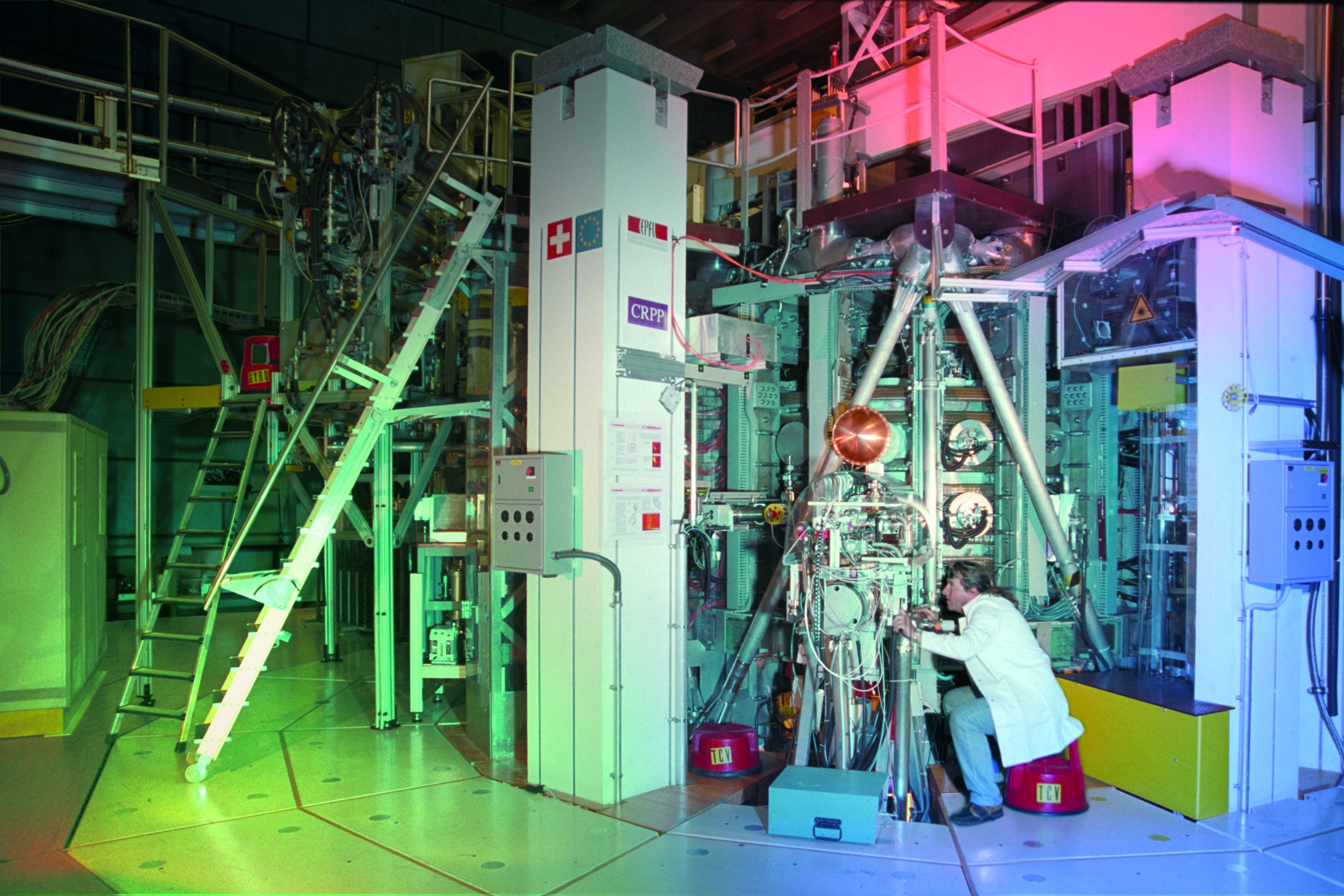
The Tokamak à configuration variable research fusion reactor at the École Polytechnique Fédérale de Lausanne

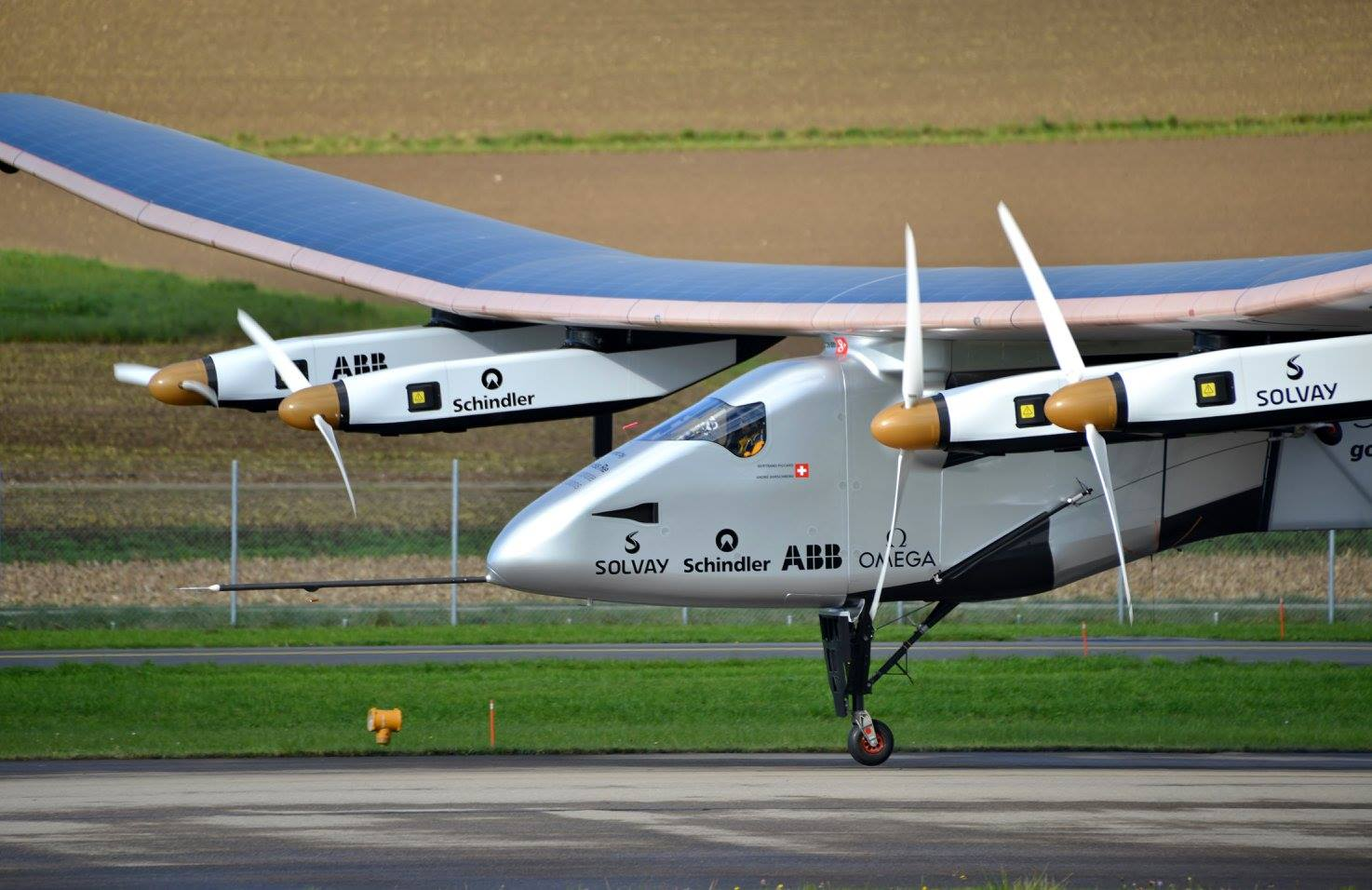
The Swiss solar aircraft Solar Impulse 2 achieved the longest non-stop solo flight in history and was the first to perform a solar-powered aerial circumnavigation of the globe between 2015 and 2016.

Science and technology in Switzerland play an important role in the Swiss economy, which has very few natural resources that are available in the country. The Swiss National Science Foundation, mandated by the Federal government, is the most important institute for promoting scientific research.

The raw output of scientific research from Switzerland consistently ranks within the top 20. Switzerland was ranked 1st in the Global Innovation Index in 2026, the same position as 2025, 2024, 2021, 2020, 2019 and 2013.

== Institutions ==
=== Universities ===
The first university, the University of Basel, was founded in 1460 and today the country has twelve universities.

- University of Basel, Basel
- University of Bern, Bern
- University of Fribourg, Fribourg
- University of Geneva, Geneva
- University of Neuchâtel, Neuchâtel
- University of Lausanne (UNIL), Lausanne
- University of Lucerne, Lucerne
- University of Lugano, Lugano
- University of St. Gallen (HSG), St. Gallen
- University of Zurich, Zürich
- Swiss Federal Institute of Technology Zurich (ETH Zurich), Zürich
- Swiss Federal Institute of Technology in Lausanne (EPFL), Lausanne

=== Research institutes ===
- Agroscope Changins-Wädenswil (ACW)
- Agroscope Liebefeld-Posieux (ALP)
- Agroscope Reckenholz-Tänikon (ART)
- European Organization for Nuclear Research (CERN)
- Swiss National Supercomputing Centre (CSCS), Manno
- Swiss Center for Electronics and Microtechnology (CSEM)
- Paul Scherrer Institute (PSI)
  - Swiss Light Source
- Swiss Federal Laboratories for Materials Science and Technology (EMPA)
- Swiss Federal Institute of Aquatic Science and Technology (EAWAG)
- Swiss Federal Institute for Forest, Snow and Landscape Research (WSL)
- Swiss Federal Institute for Vocational Education and Training (SFIVET)
- Swiss Graduate School of Public Administration (IDHEAP)
- Idiap Research Institute
- Dalle Molle Institute for Artificial Intelligence Research (IDSIA)
- Nano-Tera
- Swiss Institute of Comparative Law
- Kurt Bösch University Institute (IUKB)
- Federal Institute of Metrology (METAS)
- Federal Office of Meteorology and Climatology (MeteoSwiss)
- Swiss Institute of Bioinformatics (SIB)
- Swiss Finance Institute
- International Institute for Management Development (IMD)
- Graduate Institute of International and Development Studies (IHEID)
- Sempach Bird Observatory
- Swiss Institute of Allergy and Asthma Research
- Swiss Nanoscience Institute
- Friedrich Miescher Institute for Biomedical Research
- Campus Biotech
- Research Institute of Organic Agriculture

=== Museums ===
- The Swiss Science Center Technorama is a unique Science museum in the municipality of Winterthur in the canton of Zürich.

=== Researchers ===
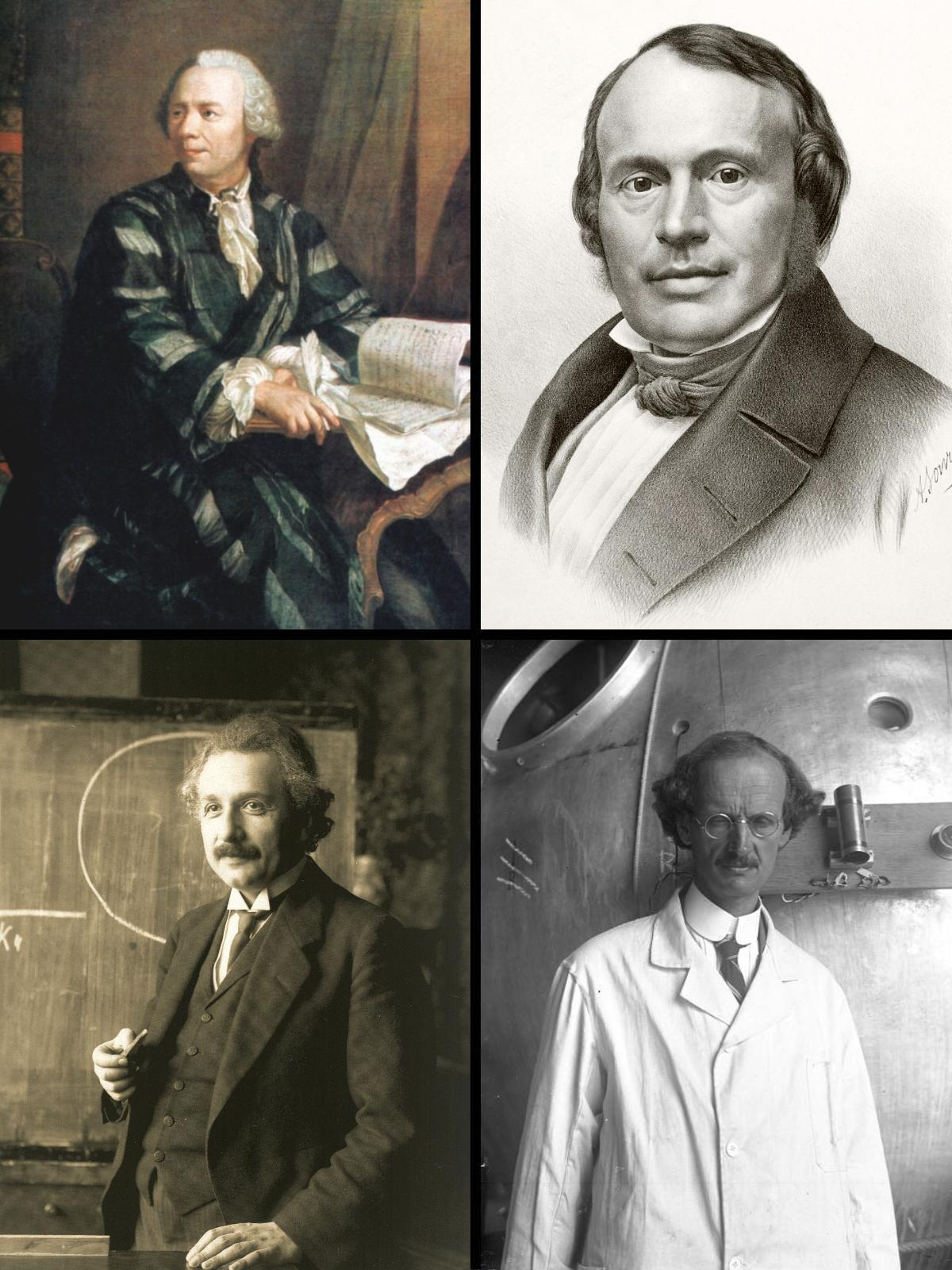
Some famous Swiss scientists: Leonhard Euler, Louis Agassiz, Albert Einstein and Auguste Piccard

With 57% of its researchers coming from other countries, Switzerland is the country with the world highest proportion of foreign researchers.

== Scientific ==
=== Astronomy and space program ===
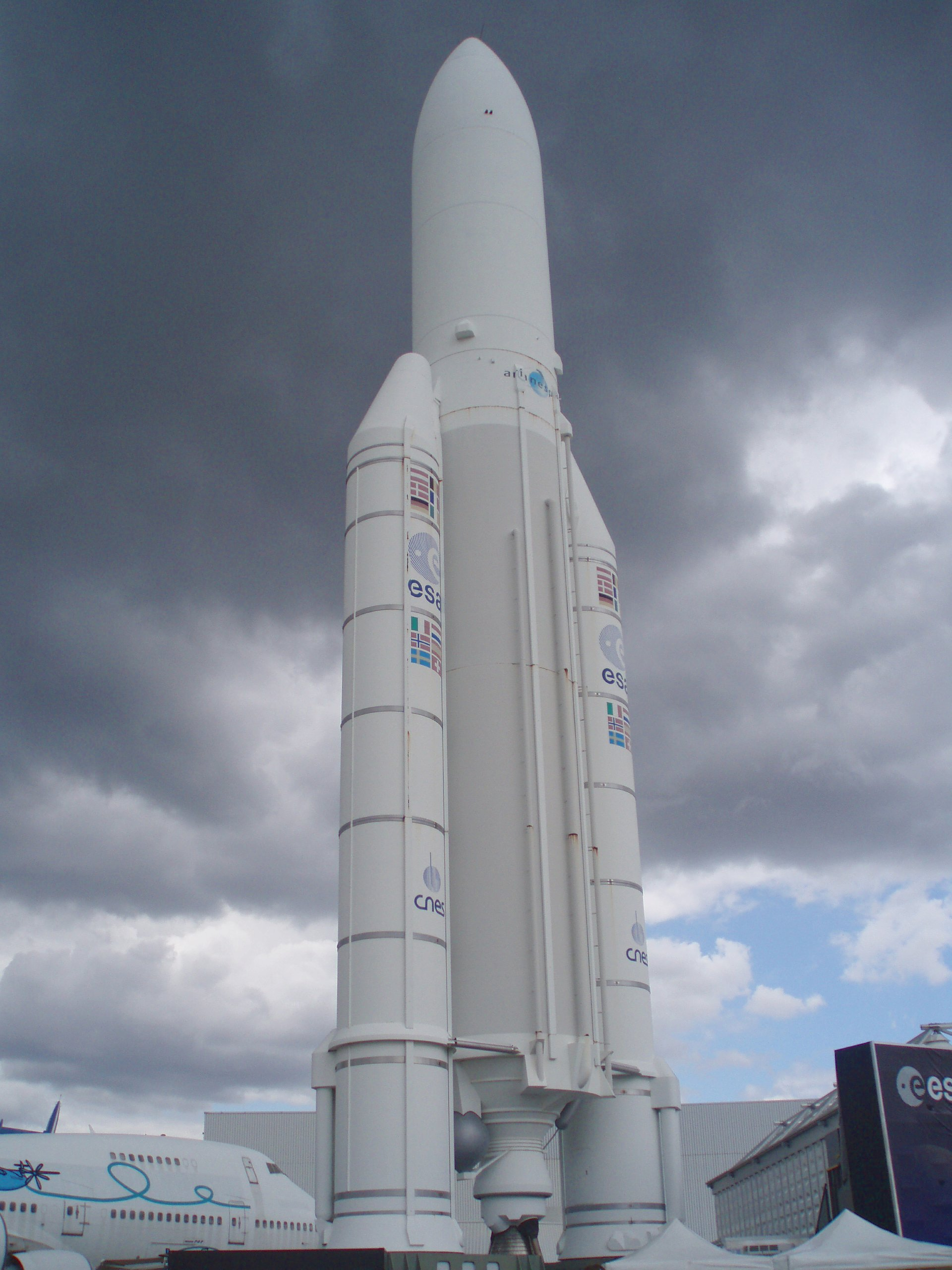
Oerlikon Space supplies the payload fairings for the Ariane 5 launcher.

Switzerland Space Agency, the Swiss Space Office, has been involved in various space technologies and programs. In addition it was one of the 10 founders of the European Space Agency in 1975 and is the seventh largest contributor to the ESA budget. In the private sector, several companies are implicated in the space industry such as RUAG Space (payload fairings) or Maxon Motors (mars rovers).

Claude Nicollier is a Swiss Astronaut and flew several missions with the United States space program.

In the field of astronomy, Michel Mayor discovered in 1995, 51 Pegasi b, the first extrasolar planet orbiting a sun-like star.

=== Mathematics ===
Leonhard Euler is considered to be the preeminent mathematician of the 18th century and one of the greatest of all time. A statement attributed to Pierre-Simon Laplace expresses Euler's influence on mathematics: "Read Euler, read Euler, he is the master of us all." Euler made important discoveries in fields as diverse as calculus and graph theory. He also introduced much of the modern mathematical terminology and notation, particularly for mathematical analysis, such as the notion of a mathematical function.

The Bernoulli family produced many notable scientists (Bernoulli number, Bernoulli's principle, Bernoulli's rule...).

=== Physics ===
Albert Einstein (naturalized in 1901) was one of the greatest physicists of all time. He is known for his theory of relativity and specifically mass–energy equivalence, expressed by the equation E = mc^{2} and also contributed in many other areas (cosmology, solid state physics). Einstein was named "Person of the Century" by Time.

More recently, in 1987, Karl Alexander Müller received the Nobel prize for his work on High-temperature superconductivity.

Furthermore, the CERN (European Organization for Nuclear Research) is located in Switzerland near Geneva.

=== Engineering ===
EPFL professor Aude Billard stated that nearly a quarter of the top 20 robotics labs in the world are located in Switzerland, despite the country having only eight million inhabitants, in a 2022 interview with Swissinfo.

New Swiss supercomputer dubbed "Alps" has been ranked 6th in the world based on its performance (2024).

=== Artificial Intelligence (AI) ===
According to one EPFL source, globally, 4 out of the 20 top labs in the field of AI are located in Switzerland. In 2025, the Swiss Federal Institute of Technology in Lausanne and Zurich provided an alternate open source platform for AI LLM language development by using the Alps supercomputer.

==== National research and coordination ====
According to Switzerland's State Secretariat for Education, Research and Innovation (SERI), artificial intelligence (AI) is considered an enabling technology and a focus area for education, research, and innovation. ETH Zurich and EPFL coordinate AI-related activities through dedicated research centers, with over 150 professorships at the two institutions linked to the field. In 2017, the two universities jointly established the Swiss Data Science Center (SDSC) to support AI and data science in academia and industry, joined by the Paul Scherrer Institute in 2021.

==== Public and institutional support ====
The Swiss National Science Foundation supports AI research through national research programs. Institutions such as the Idiap Research Institute and the Artificial Intelligence Platform of the Swiss Academy of Engineering Sciences contribute to technical development and public dialogue on AI. In 2020, the federal government adopted guidelines for the use of AI within the Federal Administration, developed by an interdepartmental working group led by SERI.

==== Swiss AI Initiative ====
The Swiss AI Initiative was launched in December 2023 with support from ETH Zurich and EPFL. It is coordinated by the Swiss National AI Institute (SNAI). The initiative is backed by computing resources, funding from the ETH Domain, and involvement from multiple academic institutions in Switzerland. Its activities include research on large-scale AI models and domain-specific applications, with an emphasis on open science.

==== Swiss National AI Institute (SNAI) ====
In October 2024, ETH Zurich and EPFL announced the creation of the Swiss National AI Institute (SNAI) to strengthen national collaboration in artificial intelligence research, education, and innovation. The initiative aims to advance transparency, trust, and open-source development in AI, and will involve over 70 professors from across Switzerland. Researchers plan to develop Switzerland’s first large national AI model and expand training opportunities for AI specialists. According to Swissinfo, SNAI will be supported by the ETH Zurich Board, ETH Zurich, EPFL, and third-party funding sources.

==== Regulation and policy developments ====
In 2025, Switzerland announced plans to introduce new artificial intelligence regulations aimed at enhancing transparency, protecting user rights, and mitigating risks, according to an article by Swissinfo. The government also proposed a law targeting disinformation and harmful content on digital platforms. In parallel, Swiss federal institutions announced plans to develop domain-specific large language models for areas such as healthcare, education, and science. Beginning March 1, 2025, limited deployment of autonomous vehicles was approved on designated road segments in certain cantons.

==== European alignment ====
In February 2025, the Swiss Federal Council announced plans to ratify the Council of Europe’s Convention on Artificial Intelligence and to implement it through sector-specific regulation. The goal is to support innovation, protect fundamental rights, and promote public trust in AI. The framework will combine binding legal measures with non-binding instruments such as industry standards. A draft bill and implementation plan are expected by the end of 2026.

==== Digital Switzerland Strategy ====
On 13 December 2024, the Federal Council adopted the updated Digital Switzerland Strategy for 2025, setting national priorities for digital transformation. The 2025 focus areas include artificial intelligence, particularly its legal context and use in the Federal Administration, as well as cybersecurity and the promotion of open-source software in public administration. For each focus area, the Confederation convenes advisory board meetings with representatives from business, science, politics, public authorities and civil society.

==== Emerging research hubs ====
Launched in Davos in 2022, Lab42 is a research laboratory focused on advancing human-level AI. Described as a politically neutral initiative, it brings together international scientists and uses challenges like the ARCathon to study abstraction and reasoning in AI. The lab was founded by neuroscientist Pascal Kaufmann and is supported by public institutions, private donors, and the municipality of Davos.

=== Chemistry ===
In the field of chemistry Germain Henri Hess is known for his discovery of the Hess's law. Albert Hofmann discovered the Lysergic acid diethylamide (LSD). Paul Hermann Müller received the Nobel prize for his discovery of the insecticidal qualities of DDT.

=== Biological and earth sciences ===
Friedrich Miescher was a Swiss physician who was the first researcher to isolate and characterize Nucleic acid (DNA). Today, a research institute in Basel (the Friedrich Miescher Institute, FMI) is named after him. Emil Theodor Kocher (Nobel Prize in Physiology or Medicine 1909) was known for his work in the physiology, pathology and surgery of the thyroid. The neurologist Walter Rudolf Hess (Nobel Prize in Physiology or Medicine 1949) mapped the areas of the brain that were responsible for the control of several vital bodily functions. The biochemist Werner Arber (Nobel Prize in Physiology or Medicine 1978) is known for his discovery of restriction endonucleases which are essential for all modern biotechnology. The Swiss born Edmond H. Fischer (Nobel Prize in Physiology or Medicine 1992) discovered how reversible phosphorylation works as a switch to activate proteins. Rolf M. Zinkernagel (Nobel Prize in Physiology or Medicine 1996) is famous for his work on the immune system.

=== Psychology ===
Carl Jung (1875–1961) was a Swiss psychiatrist and the founder of Analytical Psychology. Jung is considered the first modern psychiatrist to view the human psyche as "by nature religious" and make it the focus of exploration.

== See also ==
- Swiss National Science Foundation
- Swiss Federal Institutes of Technology Domain
- Swiss Innovation Park
- Education in Switzerland
- List of universities in Switzerland
- Swissnex
- Health Valley

== Notes and references ==
- Swiss technology powers Mars mission, Swissinfo.ch
- Oerlikon Space
