= Tajana Rosing =

American computer scientist and computer engineer

Tajana Šimunić Rosing is an American computer scientist and computer engineer specializing in embedded systems, cyber-physical systems, and smart city infrastructure, including the reliability of these systems and the control of their temperature and energy usage. She is a professor in the Department of Computer Science and Engineering at the University of California, San Diego, where she directs the System Energy Efficiency Lab and holds the Fratamico Endowed Chair.

== Education and career ==
Rosing graduated from Northern Arizona University in 1992, earned a master's degree in electrical and computer engineering from the University of Arizona in 1993, and became an engineer at Altera and then HP Labs.

While working at HP Labs, she became a graduate student at Stanford University, earning a master's degree there in 2000 and a Ph.D. in 2001. Her doctoral dissertation Energy Efficient System Design and Utilization was supervised by Giovanni De Micheli. In 2005, she moved from HP Labs to the University of California, San Diego.

== Recognition ==
The University of California, San Diego gave Rosing the John J. and Susan M. Fratamico Endowed Chair in the Jacobs School of Engineering in 2016. Rosing was named an IEEE Fellow in 2018, "for contributions to power and reliability management of Systems-on-Chip". She was named a 2021 ACM Fellow "for contributions to power, thermal, and reliability management".
