= Nikil Dutt =

American computer scientist

- Born: Gangtok, Sikkim, India
- Education: University of Illinois at Urbana–Champaign (Ph.D 1989), Pennsylvania State University (MS 1983)
- Awards: IEEE Fellow, ACM Fellow
- Scientific career
- Fields: Computer science, embedded system
- Workplaces: University of California, Irvine
- Website: www.ics.uci.edu/~dutt/

Nikil Dutt is a Distinguished Professor of Computer Science at University of California, Irvine, United States. Professor Dutt's research interests are in embedded systems, electronic design automation, computer architecture, optimizing compilers, system specification techniques, distributed systems, and formal methods.

== Early life and education ==
Born and raised in Gangtok, Sikkim, India, Dutt received his Ph.D. in computer science from the University of Illinois at Urbana-Champaign in 1989. He received a B.E.(Hons) in mechanical engineering from the Birla Institute of Technology and Science, Pilani, India in 1980, an M.S. in computer science from the Pennsylvania State University in 1983.

== Career ==
In 1989, he joined UC-Irvine as an assistant professor of computer science. He is affiliated with Center for Embedded Computer Systems (CECS), California Institute for Telecommunications and Information Technology (Calit2), the Center for Pervasive Communications and Computing (CPCC), and the Laboratory for Ubiquitous Computing and Interaction (LUCI).

His research has been recognized by Best Paper Awards and Best Paper Award Nominations at several conferences. Dutt has served as associate editor of Association for Computing Machinery's Transactions on Embedded Computer Systems (TECS) and of IEEE Transactions on VLSI Systems (TVLSI).

He was a keynote speaker at several conferences. Dutt served as editor-in-chief of ACM Transactions on Design Automation of Electronic Systems (TODAES) from 2004 to 2008.

== Awards ==
In 2007, he was selected as an ACM Distinguished Member and in 2008 an IEEE Fellow. In 2014, Dutt was elected an ACM Fellow for contributions to embedded architecture exploration, and service to electronic design automation and embedded systems.

== Books ==
- High-Level Synthesis: Introduction to Chip and System Design, Kluwer Academic Publishers, 1992
- Memory Issues in Embedded Systems-on-Chip: Optimizations and Exploration, Kluwer Academic Publishers, 1999
- Memory Architecture Exploration for Programmable Embedded Systems, Kluwer Academic Publishers, 2003
- SPARK: A Parallelizing Approach to the High-Level Synthesis of Digital Circuits, by Sumit Gupta, Rajesh K. Gupta, Nikil Dutt, Alex Nicolau, Kluwer Academic Publishers, 2004
- Functional Validation of Programmable Embedded Architectures: A Top-Down Approach, Springer-Verlag, 2005
- On-chip Communication Architectures: Current Practice, Research and Future Trends, Morgan Kaufmann/Elsevier Systems-on-Silicon Series, 2008
- Processor Description Languages: Applications and Methodologies, Morgan Kaufmann/Elsevier Systems-on-Silicon Series, 2008.

== Personal life ==
He lives in Irvine, California with his family.
