= AppyStore =

Indian education company

- Industry: Education
- Founded: 2014
- Headquarters: Mumbai, Maharashtra, India
- Website: AppyStore Website

AppyStore is a comprehensive learning videos and games app for kids up to the age of 8 years. The platform developed by Mauj Mobile, a mobile value-added services (VAS) provider curates content to help in child development by leveraging technology. Mauj is funded by Sequoia Capital, Westbridge Capital and Intel Capital.

== Background ==
AppyStore was launched in 2014 as a platform providing content for kids between the ages of 1.5 and 6 years. AppyStore subsequently extended its services for kids up to 8 years of age. The company operates on a subscription-based model and claims to have 5,000 learning games and videos segregated in 18 learning areas developed to help children gain optimal skills and qualities.

According to an article published in Business Standard, the application is claimed to be one of the top 5 apps that help to enhance the logical and imaginative capabilities of children.

AppyStore was awarded the Best app for kids by Google Play in December 2017.

== Service ==
The company provides content via a website and an Android app. The website and android app provide learning games, rhymes, phonics, reading, stories, science, numbers, maths, logic videos comprising puzzles, worksheets, videos and fun activities and the premium subscription also includes physical worksheets which are home delivered. This content is educational and has been handpicked by teachers and experts with an understanding of the major areas of child development milestones for children up to 8 years of age.

The mobile application also allows parents to track the progress of their child on the basis of the number of videos viewed.
