= International Institute of Information Technology, Hyderabad =

Public engineering institution in Hyderabad, Telangana

- Motto: Research That Matters
- Type: Deemed University
- Established: 1998; 28 years ago
- Affiliations: UGC, NAAC, AICTE
- Chairman: Ashok Jhunjhunwala
- Director: Sandeep Shukla
- Faculty: 130
- Students: 1,909
- Undergraduates: 1,350
- Postgraduates: 391
- Doctoral students: 168
- Location: Hyderabad, Telangana, 500032, India; 17.4456°N 78.3497°E
- Campus: Urban; 66 acres (270,000 m^{2})
- Language: English
- Colors: Dark Cerulean
- Nickname: IIITians (Triple 'I' Tians)
- Mascot: Jagruti – The Banyan Tree
- Website: www.iiit.ac.in

The International Institute of Information Technology Hyderabad (IIIT-Hyderabad or IIIT-H) is a deemed university, founded as a non-profit public-private partnership (N-PPP) (non-governmental) institute, located in Hyderabad, India. It is one of the first IIITs in India established under this model (alongside IIIT Bangalore) and is considered the leading institution among IIITs in India which are some of the most elite universities in the country.

The institute is also known for supporting major Olympiad training programs and is held responsible for pathways toward the International Olympiad in Artificial Intelligence (IOAI) for India, and training Indian candidates.

== History ==
IIIT Hyderabad was founded in 1998 under the public-private partnership Deemed University model by the Ministry of Human Resource Development of the Government of Telangana and NASSCOM, with the state government supplying a grant of land and buildings. As special officer for IIIT Hyderabad and the Secretary of IT for the state government, Ajay Prakash Sawhney shaped the concept and was responsible for and overseeing the initial development of the institute. Rajeev Sangal, former director of Indian Institute of Technology (BHU) Varanasi designed the syllabus and served as the first director of the institute until 10 April 2013.

The institution was founded as the Indian Institute of Information Technology Hyderabad as a foundation for the 20 Indian Institutes of Information Technology under the same model, which was renamed to International Institute of Information Technology Hyderabad in 2001, when it attained a status of a deemed university..

The institute celebrated its Silver Jubilee on 2 September 2023. The main celebrations were held from 1 to 3 September, with many earlier events throughout the previous year, including a special fire-side chat with former chief minister of Andhra Pradesh Nara Chandra Babu Naidu and the honouring of esteemed people associated with the history of the institute.

== Academics ==
IIIT Hyderabad’s academic model emphasizes early and sustained engagement in research alongside formal coursework, enabling undergraduate and postgraduate students to contribute to high-impact research outputs and peer-reviewed publications. Its curriculum offers flexibility, strong theoretical grounding, and project-based learning, with faculty granted significant autonomy in course design to respond quickly to technological advances and research developments.

Academic activities are organized through departments, centres, and advanced laboratories spanning areas such as computer science and engineering, electronics and communication engineering, computational natural sciences, computational linguistics, bioinformatics, cognitive science, spatial informatics, artificial intelligence, and semiconductor technologies. The institute’s research centres routinely publish hundreds of papers annually, with citation counts at many centres increasing significantly year over year, reflecting growth in scholarly impact.

IIIT Hyderabad has achieved recognition in national rankings and academic surveys. In the 2025 National Institutional Ranking Framework (NIRF), the institute was placed 38th among engineering colleges in India and within the top 100 overall, showing improvement over previous years. It has also been rated highly in independent surveys, including being ranked among India’s top private engineering institutions by Education World and other national rankings.

The institute’s students and faculty have a record of awards and competitive success at national and international venues, including best paper awards at IEEE and ACM conferences, innovation contest prizes, and competitive programming achievements such as participation and honors at the ACM International Collegiate Programming Contest (ICPC) World Finals. Faculty members have been recognized with prestigious honors such as election as Fellows of professional academies for contributions to engineering and education.

== Admissions ==
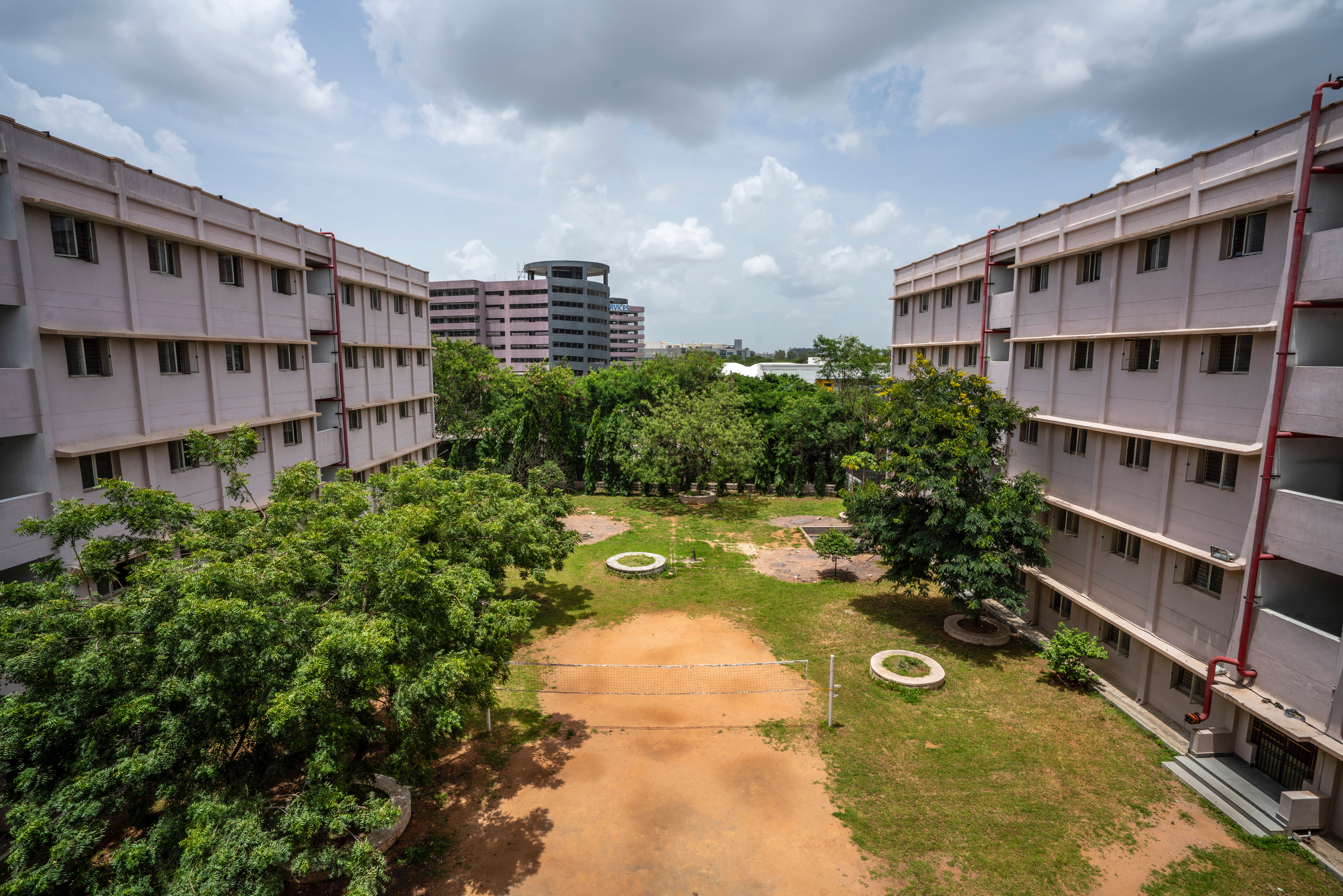
IIITH Boys Hostel

Admission to undergraduate programs is based on one of five acceptance modes: Joint Entrance Examination (Main) (JEE (Main)), the institute's own Undergraduate Engineering Entrance Examination (UGEE) and interview, representing India in the International Olympiads at class XI and XII (including the International Olympiad in Informatics (IOI), International Physics Olympiad (IPhO), International Chemistry Olympiad (IChO), International Biology Olympiad (IBO), International Astronomy Olympiad (IAO), International Mathematical Olympiad (IMO), and International Linguistics Olympiad (IOL) / Paninian Linguistics Olympiad (PLO)), Direct Admissions for Students Abroad (DASA), and lateral entry admissions to dual-degree programs through the Lateral Entry Entrance Examination (LEEE) and interview.

Admissions for postgraduate studies are on the basis of the Postgraduate Entrance Exam (PGEE) conducted by IIIT Hyderabad. Admissions to the MSIT programme at this institute are based on a test conducted every year from April to May.

=== Rankings ===
University and college rankings

General – international
- Times (World) (2023): 501-600

General – India
- NIRF (Overall) (2023): 101–150
- NIRF (Universities) (2024): 74

Engineering – India
- NIRF (2024): 47

The institute was ranked 74th among universities in India by the NIRF in 2024, and 47th among engineering colleges It is in the 501-600 band in the Times Higher Education ranking.
