= Rajesh K. Gupta =

- Citizenship: USA
- Education: Stanford University; UC Berkeley; Indian Institute of Technology, Kanpur
- Spouse: Neelam Gupta
- Children: Yash Gupta, Anand Gupta, Hersh Gupta
- Scientific career
- Fields: embedded systems Electronic design automation sensor networks
- Workplaces: University of California, San Diego; University of California, Irvine; University of Illinois, Urbana-Champaign; Intel Corporation (MPG), Santa Clara, CA.
- Doctoral advisor: Giovanni De Micheli

Rajesh K. Gupta (born 1961) is a computer scientist and engineer, currently the Qualcomm Professor in Embedded Microsystems at University of California, San Diego. His research concerns design and optimization of cyber-physical systems (CPS). He is a Principal Investigator in the NSF MetroInsight project and serves as Associate Director of the Qualcomm Institute (also known as California Institute for Telecommunications and Information Technology). His research contributions include SystemC and SPARK Parallelizing High-level Synthesis. Earlier he led NSF Expeditions on Variability in Microelectronic circuits.

He was the inaugural co-director of the UC San Diego Halıcıoğlu Data Science Institute along with Cognitive Science professor Jeffrey Elman. In addition, he chaired the Computer Science and Engineering department at UC San Diego until 2016, during a time of extraordinary growth in computer science nationwide.

He holds INRIA International Chair at the French international research institute in Rennes, Bretagne Atlantique. He is a Fellow of the IEEE, a Fellow of the Association for Computing Machinery and a Fellow of the American Association for the Advancement of Science. In 2019 he received the IEEE W. Wallace McDowell Award for his "seminal contributions in design and implementation of Microelectronic Systems-on-Chip and Cyberphysical Systems." He also served on the Engineering and Computer Science jury for the Infosys Prize, from 2014 to 2018.

== Education ==
Gupta received a BTech (1984) in Electrical Engineering from IIT Kanpur, an MS (1986) in EECS from UC Berkeley, and a PhD (1994) in Electrical Engineering from Stanford.

== Books ==
- SPARK: A Parallelizing Approach to the High-Level Synthesis of Digital Circuits, by Sumit Gupta, Rajesh K. Gupta, Nikil Dutt, Alex Nicolau, Kluwer Academic Publishers, 2004
- High-Level Verification, Methods and Tools for Verification of System-Level Designs, by Sudipta Kundu, Sorin Lerner, Rajesh K. Gupta
- Co-Synthesis of Hardware and Software for Digital Embedded Systems, by Rajesh Kumar Gupta
- Formal Methods and Models for System Design by Rajesh Gupta, Paul Le Guernic, Sandeep Kumar Shukla, Jean-Pierre Talpin
- From Variability Tolerance to Approximate Computing in Parallel Integrated Architectures and Accelerators by Abbas Rahimi, Luca Benini, Rajesh K. Gupta
