= Lycée Pareto =

Italian international school in Lausanne, Switzerland

Coordinates: 46.2968°N 6.1665°E

Lycée Pareto (Italian: Liceo Scientifico "V. Pareto" bilingue bilculturale or Liceo Pareto) is a private Italian international school in Lausanne, Switzerland. It serves upper secondary (senior high school/sixth form college) level students.

It was founded by Professor Comini in 1948. At the end of the 2002–2003 school year it moved to its current facility.

== Accreditation ==
Lycée Pareto's (upper) secondary education (Middle and High School) is not approved as a Mittelschule/Collège/Liceo by the Swiss Federal State Secretariat for Education, Research and Innovation (SERI).
