= Education in Switzerland =

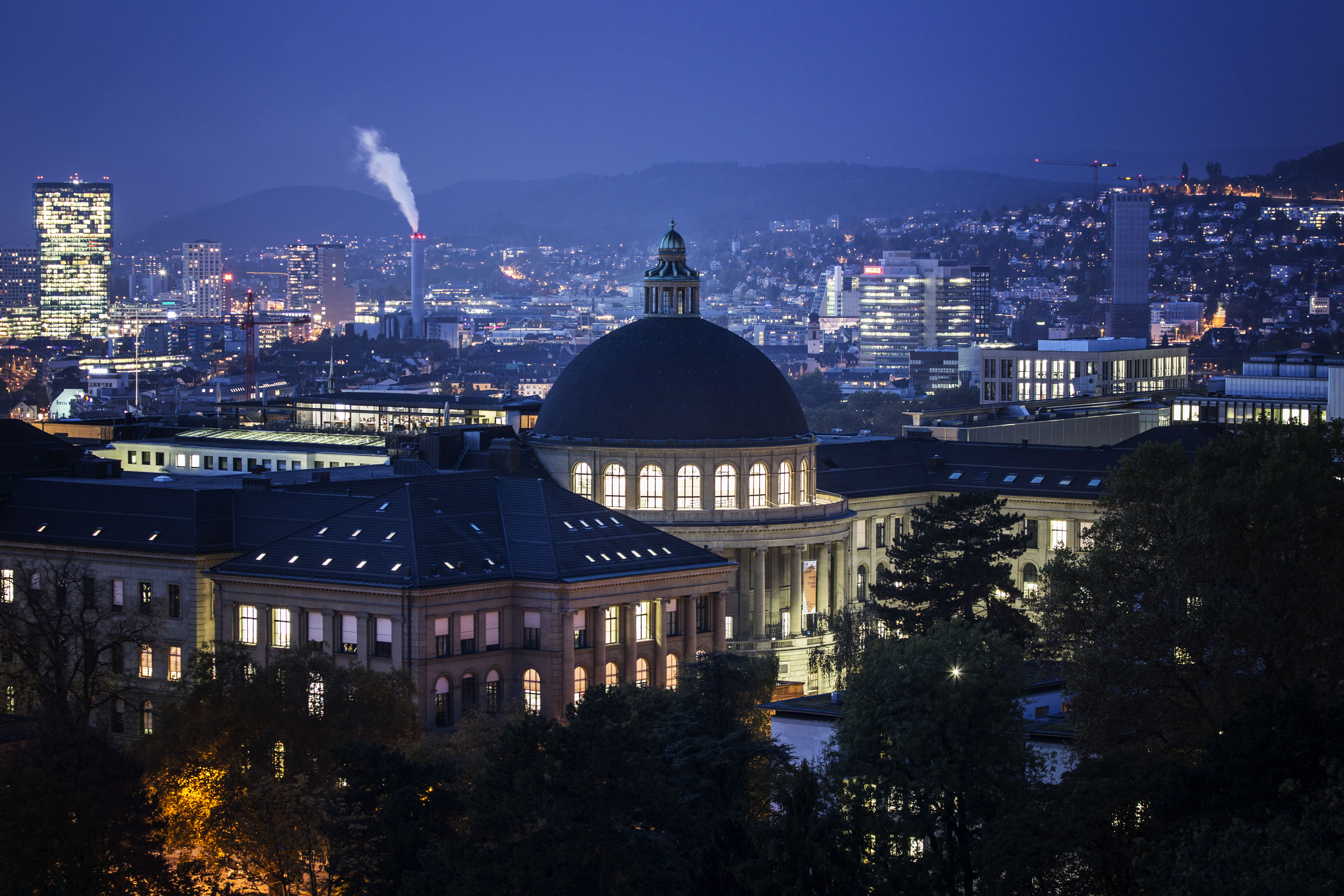
The Zentrum campus of the ETH Zurich at night

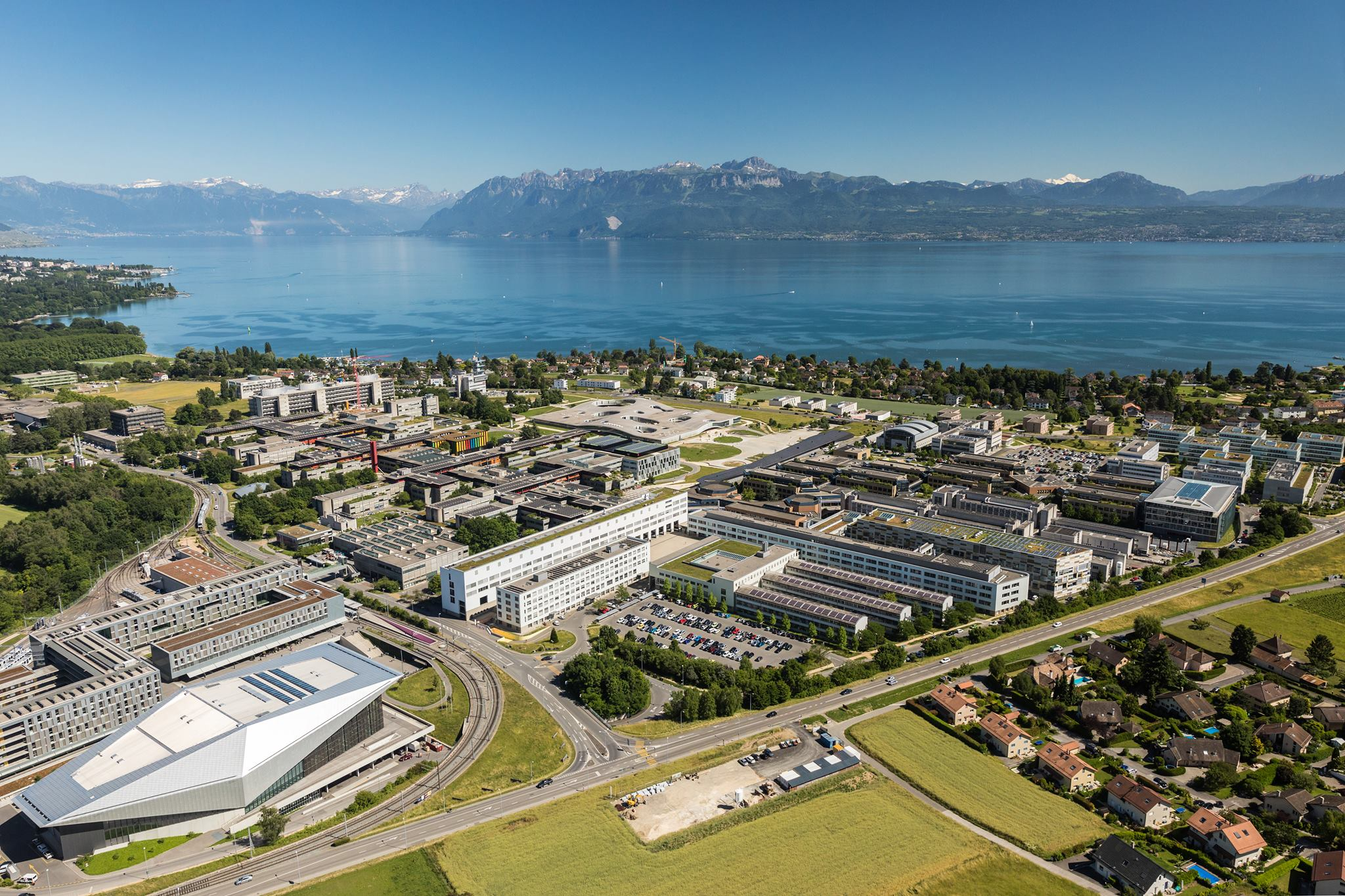
The campus of the École polytechnique fédérale de Lausanne (EPFL) and the University of Lausanne, at the shores of Lake Geneva

The education system in Switzerland is very diverse, because the constitution of Switzerland delegates the authority for the school system mainly to the cantons. The Swiss constitution sets the foundations, namely that primary school is obligatory for every child and is free in state schools and that the confederation can run or support universities.

The minimum age for primary school is about six years in all cantons but Obwalden, where it is five years and three months. After primary schools, the pupils split up according to their abilities and intentions of career paths. 90% of students complete upper secondary education.

The first university in Switzerland was founded in 1460 in Basel, with a faculty of medicine. This place has a long tradition of chemical and medical research in Switzerland. In total, there are 12 universities in Switzerland; ten of them are managed by the cantons, while two federal institutes of technology, ETH in Zürich and EPFL in Lausanne, are under the authority of the State Secretariat for Education, Research and Innovation. In addition, there are seven regional associations of Universities for Applied Sciences (Fachhochschulen) which require vocational education and a special Berufsmatura, or a Fachmatura (a graduation by a Fachmittelschule) to study. Switzerland has a high rate of foreign students in tertiary education including one of the highest in the world of doctoral level students.

Many Nobel Prizes have been awarded to Swiss scientists. More recently Vladimir Prelog, Heinrich Rohrer, Richard Ernst, Edmond Fischer, Rolf Zinkernagel, Didier Queloz, Michel Mayor, Kurt Wüthrich, and Jacques Dubochet have received Nobel Prizes in the sciences. In total, 113 Nobel Prize winners stand in relation to Switzerland and the Nobel Peace Prize has been awarded nine times to organizations residing in Switzerland. Geneva hosts the world's largest particle physics laboratory, the CERN. Other important research centers are the Empa and Paul Scherrer Institute which belong to the ETH domain.

== Primary ==
Simplified Swiss education system

The obligatory school system usually includes primary education (Primarschule in German, école primaire in French, scuola primaria / elementare in Italian and scola primara in Romansh) and secondary education I (Sekundarschule or Sekundarstufe I in German, secondaire I in French and scuola secondaria / media in Italian and scola secundar in Romansh). Before that, children generally go to Kindergarten, with one or two years is required in most cantons. In the Canton of Ticino, an optional, third year is available for three-year-old children. In some German speaking cantons kindergarten and the first one or two years may be combined into a Grundstufe or Basisstufe where they are all taught together in a single class. In French speaking cantons kindergarten is combined into a four-year cycle primaire 1 or cycle 1 which is followed by a four-year cycle primaire 2 or cycle 2 which completes their primary school.

The minimum age for primary school is about six years in all cantons but Obwalden, where it is five years and three months. The cantons Thurgau and Nidwalden allow five-year-olds to start primary school in exceptional cases. Primary school continues until grade four, five or six, depending on the school/canton. Any child can take part in school if they choose to, but pupils are separated depending on whether they speak French, German or Italian.

At around age 11–12, depending on which canton in Switzerland the child goes to school in, there could be a screening exam to decide how to separate the students for secondary school. Some cantons have a system of examination in the second semester of the final year of primary school, some cantons have an exam in second semester and continuous evaluation in both first and second semesters. In some cases, parents or legal guardians of the child are also asked for their recommendations (see Indicator C below) along with a self-evaluation done by the child. Parents' recommendation in combination with child's self-evaluation is called the third indicator (Indicator C) for evaluating the student, the first being teacher's evaluation (Indicator A), the second the results of tests (Indicator B) held in first semester. The fourth criterion is the final exam that takes place in the middle of the second semester of the final year primary school (usually held before Easter Break).

== Secondary ==
At the end of primary school (or at the beginning of secondary school), pupils are separated (see Indicator C for Fribourg under Primary School) according to their capacities and career-intentions in several (often three) sections for a period of 2–3 years (Sekundarschule) in either Pre-higher secondary school section, General section, or Basic section (Basic may be called Realschule in German or Classe d'exigence de base in French). Students who aspire for an academic career enter Mittelschule (also named Gymnasium, or Kantonsschule, a public school by the canton/state) to be prepared for further studies and the Matura (normally obtained after 12 or 13 years of school usually at the age of 18 or 19). Students intending to pursue a trade or vocation complete three to four additional years before entering Vocational Educations which are regulated by federal law and are based on a cooperation of private business offering educational job-positions and public schools offering obligatory school-lessons complementary to the on-the-job education. This so-called "dual system" splitting academic and vocational training has its continuation in the higher education system. While the academic training leads to the matura and free admission to universities, successfully completed vocational education gives access to third level of practical education, the Höhere Fachschule (Schweiz). If in addition to the vocational training the Berufsmaturitätsschule is completed the Fachhochschule may be visited instead. Rather recently introduced is a third, middle path via the Fachmittelschule which leads to a direct access to a Fachhochschule after a successful graduation of a Fachmatura. In some cantons, students with a Fachmatura may also get access to universities after a successful additional year. In the science literacy, mathematics and reading assessment of PISA, 15-year-old students in Switzerland had the 10 highest average score of 81 countries.

In the lower second level, there are several different teaching and school models that may exist. Some cantons define a specific model, while others allow the individual municipalities to determine which model to follow.

2015 Matura completion rates per canton and gender
Canton	Gender	Total matura %	Gymnasium matura %	Berufsmatura %	Fachmatura %
Switzerland	Total	37.5%	20.1%	14.7%	2.7%
Switzerland	Female	42.1%	23.7%	14.0%	4.5%
Switzerland	Male	33.1%	16.7%	15.4%	1.0%
Zürich	Total	36.3%	19.7%	15.8%	0.8%
Zürich	Female	39.7%	23.4%	15.0%	1.3%
Zürich	Male	33.1%	16.2%	16.6%	0.4%
Bern	Total	35.4%	17.9%	16.3%	1.2%
Bern	Female	40.2%	22.6%	15.6%	2.1%
Bern	Male	30.7%	13.5%	17.0%	0.3%
Lucerne	Total	31.1%	18.6%	11.0%	1.5%
Lucerne	Female	35.4%	21.7%	11.0%	2.7%
Lucerne	Male	26.9%	15.5%	11.0%	0.4%
Uri	Total	29.7%	14.7%	13.1%	1.9%
Uri	Female	30.1%	12.7%	13.3%	4.1%
Uri	Male	30.0%	17.0%	13.0%	-%
Schwyz	Total	32.9%	17.9%	13.6%	1.5%
Schwyz	Female	36.0%	21.0%	12.2%	2.8%
Schwyz	Male	29.8%	14.8%	14.8%	0.2%
Obwalden	Total	33.8%	18.2%	15.1%	0.4%
Obwalden	Female	40.7%	22.0%	17.8%	0.8%
Obwalden	Male	27.3%	14.4%	12.9%	-%
Nidwalden	Total	31.3%	16.1%	14.3%	0.9%
Nidwalden	Female	35.3%	22.4%	11.1%	1.8%
Nidwalden	Male	28.1%	11.0%	17.1%	-%
Glarus	Total	27.0%	11.7%	13.7%	1.6%
Glarus	Female	31.4%	15.4%	13.3%	2.7%
Glarus	Male	22.8%	8.2%	14.2%	0.4%
Zug	Total	42.2%	21.4%	17.9%	2.9%
Zug	Female	45.9%	23.4%	18.4%	4.2%
Zug	Male	38.8%	19.6%	17.4%	1.8%
Fribourg	Total	45.4%	22.6%	17.2%	5.5%
Fribourg	Female	50.4%	26.9%	14.5%	9.0%
Fribourg	Male	40.4%	18.7%	19.7%	2.1%
Solothurn	Total	30.7%	14.7%	12.3%	3.8%
Solothurn	Female	34.3%	15.7%	12.3%	6.4%
Solothurn	Male	27.2%	13.7%	12.3%	1.3%
Basel-Stadt	Total	48.4%	32.1%	10.6%	5.6%
Basel-Stadt	Female	54.3%	37.2%	9.8%	7.3%
Basel-Stadt	Male	42.4%	27.1%	11.5%	3.9%
Basel-Landschaft	Total	46.3%	23.1%	17.4%	5.8%
Basel-Landschaft	Female	53.0%	27.7%	15.4%	9.8%
Basel-Landschaft	Male	39.8%	18.6%	19.3%	1.9%
Schaffhausen	Total	34.4%	15.4%	16.1%	2.9%
Schaffhausen	Female	40.0%	19.9%	15.5%	4.6%
Schaffhausen	Male	29.0%	11.1%	16.7%	1.1%
Appenzell; Ausserrhoden	Total	32.4%	17.5%	13.4%	1.5%
Appenzell; Ausserrhoden	Female	34.4%	18.4%	13.3%	2.7%
Appenzell; Ausserrhoden	Male	30.8%	16.7%	13.6%	0.5%
Appenzell; Innerrhoden	Total	30.0%	14.4%	14.6%	0.9%
Appenzell; Innerrhoden	Female	34.8%	19.2%	14.7%	0.9%
Appenzell; Innerrhoden	Male	26.0%	10.4%	14.6%	1.0%
St. Gallen	Total	30.5%	14.0%	14.6%	1.8%
St. Gallen	Female	34.0%	16.3%	14.1%	3.6%
St. Gallen	Male	27.2%	11.9%	15.1%	0.2%
Graubünden	Total	37.8%	18.6%	17.0%	2.2%
Graubünden	Female	41.7%	20.9%	16.9%	3.9%
Graubünden	Male	34.1%	16.5%	17.1%	0.6%
Aargau	Total	34.2%	15.8%	15.7%	2.8%
Aargau	Female	38.9%	19.7%	14.4%	4.8%
Aargau	Male	30.0%	12.3%	16.9%	0.8%
Thurgau	Total	29.8%	13.2%	14.7%	1.9%
Thurgau	Female	34.9%	16.9%	14.3%	3.7%
Thurgau	Male	25.1%	9.7%	15.1%	0.3%
Ticino	Total	50.5%	27.5%	20.8%	2.1%
Ticino	Female	55.6%	31.1%	21.2%	3.2%
Ticino	Male	45.6%	24.1%	20.4%	1.1%
Vaud	Total	36.8%	24.2%	9.8%	2.7%
Vaud	Female	41.3%	27.3%	9.4%	4.6%
Vaud	Male	32.4%	21.2%	10.2%	1.0%
Valais	Total	37.1%	16.1%	14.8%	6.2%
Valais	Female	42.8%	18.8%	13.9%	10.1%
Valais	Male	31.4%	13.6%	15.7%	2.1%
Neuchâtel	Total	46.3%	24.4%	19.5%	2.4%
Neuchâtel	Female	52.8%	29.0%	20.2%	3.6%
Neuchâtel	Male	40.2%	20.1%	18.7%	1.4%
Geneva	Total	45.8%	28.9%	10.6%	6.4%
Geneva	Female	50.6%	33.1%	8.6%	8.9%
Geneva	Male	41.2%	24.9%	12.5%	3.9%
Jura	Total	39.3%	22.2%	13.8%	3.3%
Jura	Female	50.9%	29.0%	16.5%	5.4%
Jura	Male	29.8%	16.8%	11.6%	1.4%

=== Separated model ===
Pupils are allocated to institutionally separate school types, according to their performance levels. The structure is based on the principle of equal capacities among pupils. Generally, each school type has its own adapted curricula, teaching material, teachers and, in some cases, its own range of subjects. In general, there are 2 to 3 school types (4 in a minority of cantons), the names of which vary. In the structure with 2 school types, a distinction is made between the performance-based group at basic level (with the least demanding requirements), and the performance-based group at advanced level. In the structure with 3 school types, there is a performance-based group at basic level, a performance-based group at intermediate level and a performance-based group at advanced level. The requirements of the performance-based group at advanced level are the most demanding and this school type generally prepares pupils for transfer to the matura schools.

=== Cooperative model ===
The cooperative model is based on core classes with different performance requirements. Each pupil is assigned to a core class according to his or her performance level. The pupils attend lessons in certain subjects in differentiated requirement-based groups (whereby the core classes are mixed).

=== Integrated model ===
The integrated model does not use different school types or core classes. Pupils with different performance levels attend the same class and mixing is maintained. In certain subjects, teaching occurs on differentiated requirement-based levels.

== International education ==
As of March 2016, the International Schools Consultancy (ISC) listed Switzerland as having 103 international schools. ISC defines an 'international school' in the following terms "ISC includes an international school if the school delivers a curriculum to any combination of pre-school, primary or secondary students, wholly or partly in English outside an English-speaking country, or if a school in a country where English is one of the official languages, offers an English-medium curriculum other than the country's national curriculum and is international in its orientation." This definition is used by publications including The Economist.

Switzerland was the birthplace of the International Baccalaureate in 1968 and 50 schools in Switzerland offer one or more of the IB programmes (Primary, Middle Years, Diploma and Career-related Programmes).

== Tertiary ==
Tertiary education depends on the education chosen in secondary education. For students with a matura, university is the most common one. Apprentices who attended a vocational high school will often add a Fachhochschule or a Höhere Fachschule to their curriculum.

There are 14 public and generic universities in Switzerland, 10 of which are maintained at cantonal level and usually offer a range of non-technical subjects. Of the remaining 4 institutions, 2 are run by the Swiss Confederation and are known as "Swiss Federal Institutes of Technology".

Switzerland is well known for its advanced business education system. A number of world-class universities and MBA programmes, such as the International Institute for Management Development, HEC Lausanne, University of St. Gallen, Kalaidos FH and University of Zurich belong to that category. All of them are also registered in the Financial Times ranking. See also the list of universities in Switzerland.

Switzerland has a high rate of international students. In 2013, 16.9% of the total tertiary enrollment in Switzerland came from outside the country, a rate that is the 10th highest of the 291 countries included in the UNESCO Institute for Statistics. This rate was just higher than Austria (16.8) and just lower than the United Kingdom (17.5). However, due to the much smaller tertiary system in Switzerland their 47,000 foreign tertiary enrollments are dwarfed by much larger countries such as the United States (740,000), the United Kingdom (416,000), France (228,000) and Germany (196,000). Many international students attend Swiss universities for advanced degrees. In 2013 masters programs enrolled about 27% foreign students (fourth highest rate) and doctoral programs were 52% foreign (second behind Luxembourg).

Switzerland also has a high rate of PhD students and inhabitants with doctoral degrees. In 2014 Switzerland had the highest rate of inhabitants (2.98%) with doctoral degrees in the world. In 2010, with 2.5%, Switzerland had the second-highest rate of inhabitants with doctoral degrees in Europe. In 2008, the number of students graduating with a PhD was 3209 (up from 2822 in 2000) of which 45% were foreigners (up from 31% in 2000).

2015 University enrollment
University	License/ Certificate	Bachelor	Master	Doctorate	Continuing Education	Other	Total
University of Basel	3	6,588	3,363	2,691	694	82	13,421
University of Bern	1	7,869	4,424	2,647	1,566	155	16,662
University of Fribourg	125	5,729	3,000	1,325	197	133	10,509
University of Geneva	237	7,831	4,561	2,503	976	283	16,391
University of Lausanne	206	7,157	4,178	2,175	204	183	14,103
University of Lucerne	58	1,436	954	325	57	15	2,845
University of Neuchâtel	91	2,166	1,376	614	37	40	4,324
University of St. Gallen	15	4,163	3,010	684	593	300	8,765
University of Zurich	746	13,513	5,938	5,076	700	77	26,050
University of Lugano	0	1,370	1,114	275	197	7	2,963
EPF Lausanne	0	4,720	2,552	2,058	195	383	9,908
ETH Zurich	229	8,704	5,270	4,021	405	115	18,744

2015 University subjects studied
University	Social Sciences	Economics	Law	Physical and Natural Sciences	Medicine and Pharmacy	Engineering and Technical Sciences	Interdisciplinary and other
University of Basel	4,098	1,463	1,285	2,349	2,936	0	1,290
University of Bern	5,965	2,387	1,960	2,276	3,419	0	655
University of Fribourg	5,400	1,334	1,728	1,407	363	0	277
University of Geneva	7,924	1,496	1,957	1,963	2,497	0	554
University of Lausanne	4,911	2,831	1,938	1,868	1,968	0	587
University of Lucerne	1,295	131	1,344	0	0	0	75
University of Neuchâtel	2,049	420	824	735	122	1	173
University of St. Gallen	539	7,272	840	0	0	0	114
University of Zurich	10,706	3,393	3,702	4,286	3,872	0	91
University of Lugano	855	1,026	0	281	0	801	0
EPF Lausanne	0	68	0	3,872	0	5,804	164
ETH Zurich	205	0	0	6,721	469	11,175	174

== Educational rankings ==
In 1995 Switzerland took part in the Trends in International Mathematics and Science Study (TIMSS) assessment. TIMSS is an international assessment of the mathematics and science knowledge of fourth- and eighth-grade students around the world. It was developed by the International Association for the Evaluation of Educational Achievement (IEA) to allow participating nations to compare students' educational achievement across borders. In 1995, Switzerland was one of forty-one nations that participated in the study. They did not participate in later studies. Among 8th graders, Switzerland ranked 15th overall, 8th in math and 25th in science.

A National Center for Education Statistics (NCES) study that used the TIMSS assessment among 12th graders found similar results. The Swiss students were in their upper secondary education and were attending either a gymnasium, general education, teacher training or advanced vocation training. In math, the Swiss scored a 540 (the average score was 500), and were 3rd out of 21. Their science score was 523, which was 8th out of 21. In physics, they scored 488 (the average was 501) and were tied for 9th place out of 16. The advanced mathematics score was 533 which was 3rd out of 16.

The World Economic Forum's Global Competitiveness Report for 2010-11 ranked Switzerland as first overall. Under the fifth pillar of the report, Higher education and training, the Swiss had a score of 5.79, which is the fourth highest among all the countries surveyed.

== Cantonal school systems ==
While compulsory schooling in Switzerland is between 9 and 11 years long, many of the specifics of the system vary by canton. In most cases, kindergarten lasts 1 to 2 years, primary level lasts 6 years, and the lower secondary level 3 years. In Ticino, there is a third, non-mandatory, kindergarten year, primary lasts 5 years, followed by 4 years of lower secondary. In some German speaking cantons kindergarten and the first one or two years may be combined into a Grundstufe or Basisstufe where they are all taught together in a single class. In the French speaking cantons (FR, GE, JU, NE, VD, VS) kindergarten is combined with primary to create 2 primary levels, each 4 years long. In 17 cantons, it is compulsory to attend pre-school. In almost all cantons, the municipalities are obliged to provide at least one year of pre-school classes.

This table shows the school system for 2017/2018 and how the lower secondary schools are organized:

Canton	Total Years Required	Years of Kindergarten required	Years of Kindergarten offered	Length of Primary School	Length of mandatory Secondary School	Combined Kindergarten and early Primary Classes (Basisstufe)?	Separate Secondary Schools?	Cooperative Secondary Schools?	Integrated Secondary Schools?	Students attending Compulsory Schools (2014/15)	Students attending non-Compulsory Secondary Schools (2014/15)
Zürich	11	2	2	6	3	No	Yes	No	No	154,800	62,194
Bern	11	2	2	6	3	Yes	Yes	Yes	Yes	106,365	46,486
Lucerne	10	1	2	6	3	Yes	Yes	Yes	Yes	42,526	21,397
Uri	10	1	2	6	3	No	Yes	Yes	Yes	3,951	980
Schwyz	10	1	2	6	3	No	Yes	Yes	No	16,827	4,500
Obwalden	10	1	1	6	3	No	No	Yes	Yes	4,016	1,156
Nidwalden	10	1	2	6	3	No	No	Yes	Yes	4,280	1,069
Glarus	11	2	2	6	3	Yes	Yes	Yes	Yes	4,277	1,396
Zug	10	1	1	6	3	No	No	No	Yes	13,759	4,860
Fribourg	11	0	0	8	3	No	Yes	No	Yes	39,818	12,789
Solothurn	11	2	2	6	3	No	Yes	No	No	27,883	8,537
Basel-Stadt	11	2	2	6	3	No	Yes	No	No	17,635	11,155
Basel-Landschaft	11	2	2	6	3	No	Yes	No	No	31,139	11,555
Schaffhausen	11	2	2	6	3	No	No	No	Yes	8,186	2,880
Appenzell Ausserrhoden	9	1	2	6	2	No	Yes	Yes	Yes	5,892	1,476
Appenzell Innerrhoden	10	1	2	6	3	No	Yes	Yes	Yes	1,907	151
St. Gallen	11	2	2	6	3	No	No	No	Yes	57,482	25,396
Graubünden	9	0	2	6	3	No	Yes	Yes	No	19,503	7,552
Aargau	11	2	2	6	3	No	Yes	No	No	73,999	24,530
Thurgau	11	2	2	6	3	Yes	Yes	No	No	29,991	8,448
Ticino	11	2	3	5	4	No	Yes	No	No	38,268	16,712
Vaud	11	0	0	8	3	No	Yes	No	No	94,827	37,732
Valais	11	0	0	8	3	No	Yes	No	No	36,692	14,527
Neuchâtel	11	0	0	8	3	No	Yes	No	No	21,185	8,937
Geneva	11	0	0	8	3	No	Yes	No	No	56,943	26,424
Jura	11	0	0	8	3	No	Yes	No	No	8,807	3,301

== Education demographics ==
During the 2008/09 school year there were 1,502,257 students in the entire Swiss educational system. In kindergarten or pre-school, there were 152,919 students (48.6% female). These students were taught by 13,592 teachers (96.0% female) in 4,949 schools, of which 301 were private schools. There were 777,394 students (48.6% female) in the obligatory schools, which include primary and lower secondary schools. These students were taught by 74,501 teachers (66.3% female) in 6,083 schools, of which 614 were private. The upper secondary school system had 337,145 students (46.9% female). They were taught by 13,900 teachers (42.3% female) in 730 schools, of which 240 were private. The tertiary education system had 234,799 students (49.7% female). They were taught by 37,546 teachers (32.8% female) in 367 schools.

== See also ==
- Juvenile crime in Switzerland
- Johann Heinrich Pestalozzi - introducer of the "head, hand and heart" principle of education
- List of universities in Switzerland
- List of largest universities by enrollment in Switzerland
- Science and technology in Switzerland
