= Liceo Vermigli =

Location
- 2nd Floor and 3rd Floor, Erismannstrasse 6, 8004 Zürich; Zürich; Switzerland
- Coordinates: 47°23′38″N 08°29′18″E

Information
- Website: liceo-vermigli.com

Liceo linguistico e scientifico "Pier Martire Vermigli" (Italian pronunciation: [liˈtʃɛːo liŋˈɡwistiko e ʃʃenˈtiːfiko ˌpjɛr ˈmartire verˈmiʎʎi]) is a private Italian international liceo (upper secondary school) in Zürich, Switzerland. It is on the second and third floors of the "Casa d'Italia" facility, which also houses the Scuola statale primaria e dell'infanzia/Scuola Italiana di Zurigo, a primary school operated by the Italian government; and the Scuola media paritaria "Enrico Fermi", which is a private Italian lower secondary school.

It was founded in 1978.

== Accreditation ==
=== By Swiss authorities ===
The Liceo linguistico e scientifico "Pietro Martire Vermigli" upper secondary education program is recognised as a Mittelschule, by the bureau for gymnasial and vocational education (Mittelschul- und Berufsbildungsamt), administration of education (Bildungsdirektion), canton of Zürich and by the Swiss Federal State Secretariat for Education, Research and Innovation (SERI).

=== By Italian authorities ===
The Italian Ministry of Foreign Affairs designates Liceo Vermigli as an overseas Italian school.
