= École française de Lausanne-Valmont =

Coordinates: 46.5352427°N 6.6554754°E

Location
- Lausanne; Switzerland

Information
- School type: International School
- Religious affiliation(s): Catholic Church
- Established: 1963; 62 years ago
- Age: 3 to 18
- Enrollment: c.400 (2016)
- Language: French

École française de Lausanne-Valmont is a Catholic French international school in Lausanne, Switzerland. It serves levels maternelle (preschool) through terminale, the final year of lycée (sixth form college/senior high school). The Marcelline Sisters of Milan established the school in 1963. As of 2016 it has over 400 students.

== Accreditation ==
École française VL's (upper) secondary education (Middle and High School) is not accredited as a Mittelschule/Collège/Liceo by the Swiss Federal State Secretariat for Education, Research and Innovation (SERI).
