= Swiss Space Office =

National space program of Switzerland

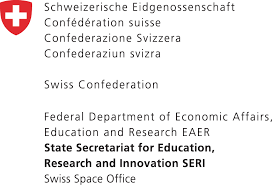
Logo

The Swiss Space Office (SSO) is the federal government's competence centre for national and international space matters. In its role it cooperates closely with other federal offices and is responsible for the preparation and implementation of the policy and strategic orientations of the space domain in Switzerland. The SSO is part of the State Secretariat for Education, Research, and Innovation. The Head of the SSO is Catherine Kropf.

The SSO ensures international cooperation in the space sector and promotes contacts with foreign partners. It represents Swiss interests in international organisations and international cooperation programmes. The most important instrument for implementing Swiss space policy is the participation of Switzerland in European Space Agency (ESA) programmes and activities. State Secretary Prof. Dr. Martina Hirayama and Catherine Kropf lead the delegation to ESA at ministerial, respectively delegate level.

Switzerland is a founding member of the European Space Agency, and has actively participated in European space development since 1960. The Swiss Space Office opened in 1998. The role of the SSO expanded to cover all aspects of space policy in 2000, when the new national constitution came into force.

According to the International Astronautical Federation (IAF), the SSO is "the Swiss federal government's competence centre for national and international space matters. It promotes and coordinates Swiss activities in space research and utilisation. Swiss space policy and the new federal legislation on space operations are being developed under the leadership of SERI." The SSO office in Bern is responsible for the secretariat of the Federal Commission for Space Affairs (CFAS), and the Interdepartmental Coordination Committee for Space Affairs (IKAR).

== Budget ==
The SSO manages two guarantee credit lines that are approved by Swiss Parlament as part of the "Dispatch on the Promotion of Education, Research and Innovation".

The R&D related space budget based on the 2026 Budget of the Swiss Confederation amounts to CHF 195 million ($214 million) for ESA and CHF 6,9 million for national activities.

In 2026, Switzerland contributed EUR 203 million ($232 million) or around 3.7% to ESA's budget.

The discrepancy between ESA payments and the national budget are explained by hedging operations carried out in accordance with federal requirements.

== Heads of the Swiss Space Office ==
Name	Start dat	End date	References
Catherine Kropf	2026	in office	
Renato Krpoun	2016	2026	
Daniel Neuenschwander	2009	2016	
Daniel Fürst	2007	2009	
Marc Berschi	2005	2007	
Patrick Piffaretti	2002	2005	
Peter Creola	1998	2002	

== Swiss Astronauts ==
Switzerland does not have its own astronaut corps, but participates in the ESA European Exploration Envelope Programme (E3P) and thus also in the astronaut corps of ESA. The Swiss Space Office (SSO) contributes to the governance of the programme through the ESA Council and the ESA Human Spaceflight Microgravity and Exploitation Programme Board (PB‑HME).

ESA Astronaut Claude Nicollier is of Swiss nationality and has been on several missions with the United States space program in the 1990s and is also a member of the European Astronaut Corps. By 2007 he had retired from Swiss space missions to become a professor at EPFL. In 2022 Swiss national Marco Sieber was selected by ESA as career astronaut and In April 2024 he completed his astronaut training.

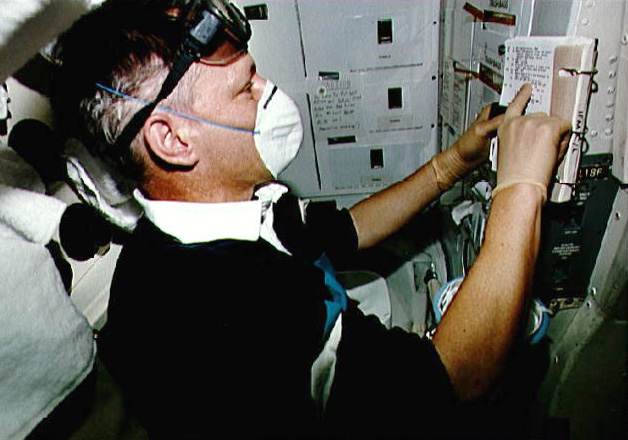
Claude Nicollier performs maintenance on STS-46 in 1992

=== Astronautic space missions ===
U.S.-Swiss Space Shuttle missions:

- STS-46 in 1992. European Retrievable Carrier EURECA Atlantis
- STS-61 in 1993. Hubble Servicing Mission 2 Endeavour
- STS-75 in 1996. TSS-1R Italian mission Columbia
- STS-103 in 1999. Hubble Servicing Mission 3A Discovery

== Examples of Swiss space technology and research ==
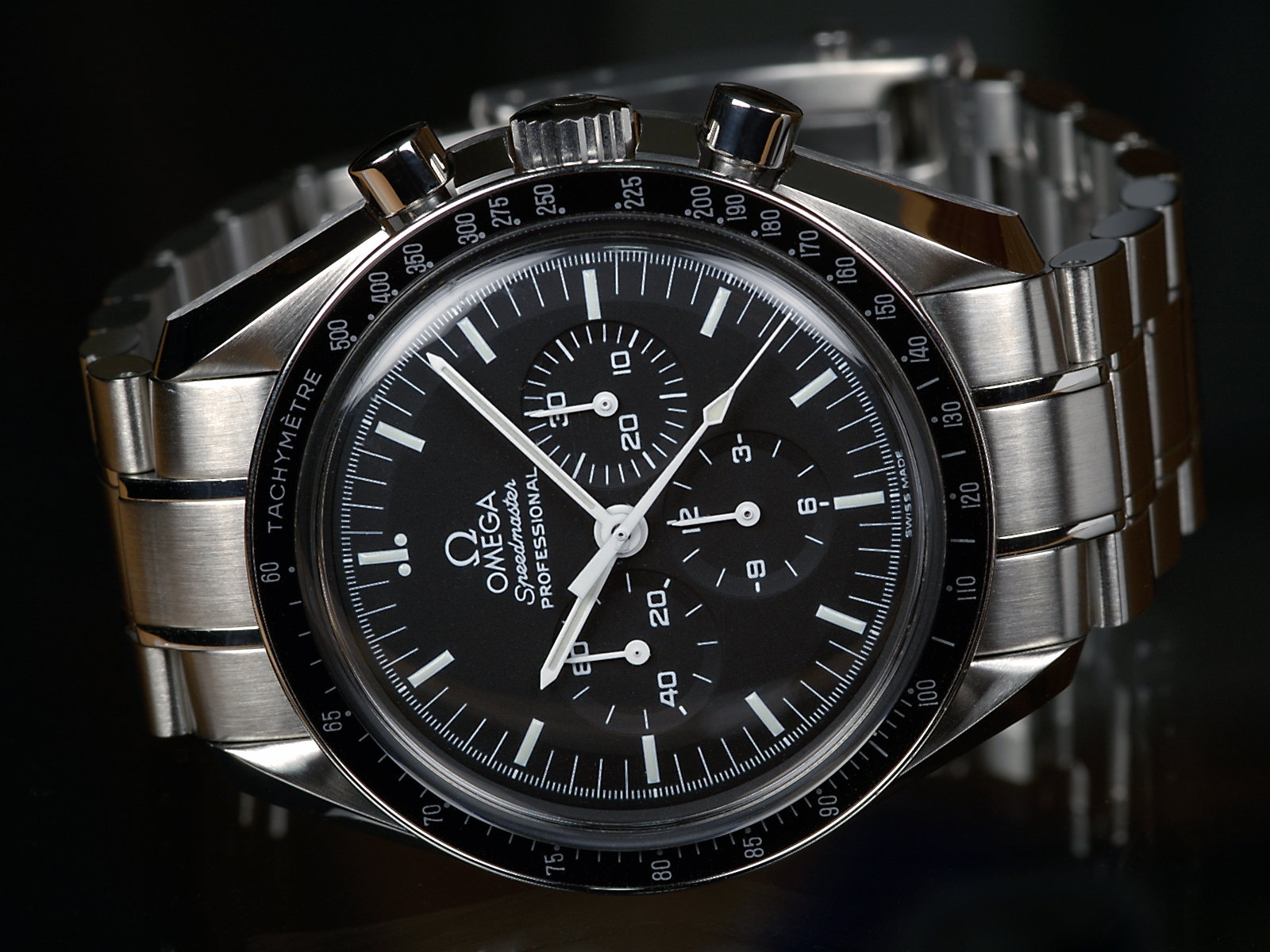
After elaborate testing, the Swiss Omega Speedmaster Professional watch became certified for NASA space missions in 1965 and was used by the first astronauts on the Moon

Selected examples of Swiss contributions to space exploration and technology.

- Omega Speedmaster, worn by Buzz Aldrin on the Moon during the Apollo 11 mission, and standard equipment for NASA astronauts.
- Solar sail (SWC experiment) developed at University of Bern used by the Apollo Program to measure solar wind on the Moon.
- ESA Ariane rocket and Vega rocket uses Swiss payload fairings from Beyond Gravity.
- Genesis probe sample return analyzed at Federal Institute of Technology at Zurich.
- NASA Mars Pathfinder rover used Swiss Maxon motors.
- University of Neuchatel contributed to the Mars Phoenix (spacecraft).
- University of Bern developed an ultra stable light source for testing NASA's TESS space telescope.
- CHEOPS (CHaracterising ExOPlanets Satellite) space telescope developed at the University of Bern.
- The Colour and Stereo Surface Imaging System (CaSSIS) is a high-resolution, 4.5 m per pixel (15 ft/pixel), colour stereo camera on board ESA's Trace Gas Orbiter developed at the University of Bern.
- The HummingSat telecommunication satellite.

== Offices ==
- Headquarters: State Secretariat for Education, Research and Innovation, Einsteinstrasse 2, 3003 Bern, Switzerland.

== See also ==
- List of government space agencies
- Geneva Observatory
- Science and technology in Switzerland
- Zimmerwald Observatory
