= Istituto Leonardo da Vinci =

Istituto Leonardo da Vinci or Istituto di Istruzione Superiore Leonardo da Vinci (IIS Leonardo da Vinci) may refer to:

Schools in Italy:

- Istituto Leonardo da Vinci Analisi in Florence
- Istituto Statale d'Istruzione Superiore Leonardo da Vinci - Cologno Monzese
- Istituto di Istruzione Superiore Leonardo da Vinci - Fiumicino
- Istituto di Istruzione Superiore “Leonardo da Vinci” - Carate Brianza

Schools outside of Italy:

- Istituto Leonardo da Vinci in Lugano, Switzerland
