= Istituto Leonardo da Vinci (Switzerland) =

Coordinates: 46.0005005°N 8.9443611°E

Istituto Leonardo da Vinci (LdV) is a private Italian international school located in Lugano, Switzerland. It serves levels scuola primaria (primary school) through liceo (senior high school/sixth form college).

== Accreditation ==
LdV's (upper) secondary education (Middle and High School) is not approved as a Mittelschule/Collège/Liceo by the Swiss Federal State Secretariat for Education, Research and Innovation (SERI).
