= Euresearch =

Swiss national association

- Founded: 2001, Switzerland
- Type: Nonprofit organisation
- Legal status: Association; Commercial Register Number: CH-035.6.033.770-8
- Headquarters: Bern, Switzerland
- President: Edwin Charles Constable
- Vice-President: Antonella Santuccione Chadha
- Director: Francesco Kienzle
- Website: https://www.euresearch.ch/

Euresearch is a non-profit organisation that provides a Swiss guide to European research and innovation. It was founded in 2001 and become a Swiss association in 2004. In 2026, Euresearch celebrates its 25th anniversary.

Euresearch is federally funded and mandated by the State Secretariat for Education, Research and Innovation (SERI) to provide information and advisory services on the European Union (EU) Framework Programmes for Research and Innovation (FPs) to researchers and innovators in public institutions and the private sector in Switzerland.

Euresearch has been active since FP6 and the mandate from SERI has been renewed several times. Euresearch was evaluated in 2010 and 2015.

== Services ==
Euresearch provides services for all the stages of the EU funding process. Services include individual consultation, training and events, and publications such as factsheets and a monthly newsletter.

== Organisation ==
Euresearch is made up of the Network Office in Bern and Regional Offices located at Swiss universities, federal institutes of technology and universities of applied sciences. The EU FP National Contact Points for Switzerland, who specialise in topics and areas of the EU FPs, are located at the Network Office. The Regional Offices have advisors who know the specifics of their own institution and company advisors who provide support to businesses.

== Association bodies ==
The Euresearch Association comprises three bodies:

1. Euresearch Association Members
2. Euresearch Association Board
3. Euresearch Management Board

=== Euresearch association members ===
Association members are the Swiss universities, federal institutes of technology, universities of applied sciences and other organisations who host a Euresearch office and/or pay a membership fee. Each member nominates a representative, who serves a four-year term. The composition of members is:

==== Universities ====
- University of Basel
- University of Bern
- University of Fribourg
- University of Geneva
- University of Lausanne
- University of Lugano
- University of Neuchâtel
- University of Lucerne
- University of St. Gallen
- University of Zurich

==== Federal institutes of technology ====
- Swiss Federal Institute of Technology Zurich
- Swiss Federal Institute of Technology Lausanne

==== Universities of applied sciences ====
- Bern University of Applied Sciences
- University of Applied Sciences and Arts of Southern Switzerland
- University of Applied Sciences of the Grisons
- University of Applied Sciences and Arts Northwestern Switzerland
- Eastern Switzerland University of Applied Sciences
- Lucerne University of Applied Sciences and Arts
- University of Applied Sciences and Arts of Western Switzerland
- Zurich University of Applied Sciences

===== Other organisations =====
- Swiss National Science Foundation
- Swissmem

=== Euresearch Association Board ===
The Association Board is the executive body of Euresearch and consists of 10-12 members elected by the Association members. Board members serve a four-year term.

=== Euresearch Management Board ===
The Management Board is the operational body of Euresearch and consists of the director, vice-director and representatives from the offices.
