= Gerd Folkers =

Swiss pharmaceutical scientist

Prof. Dr.rer.nat. em. Gerd Folkers
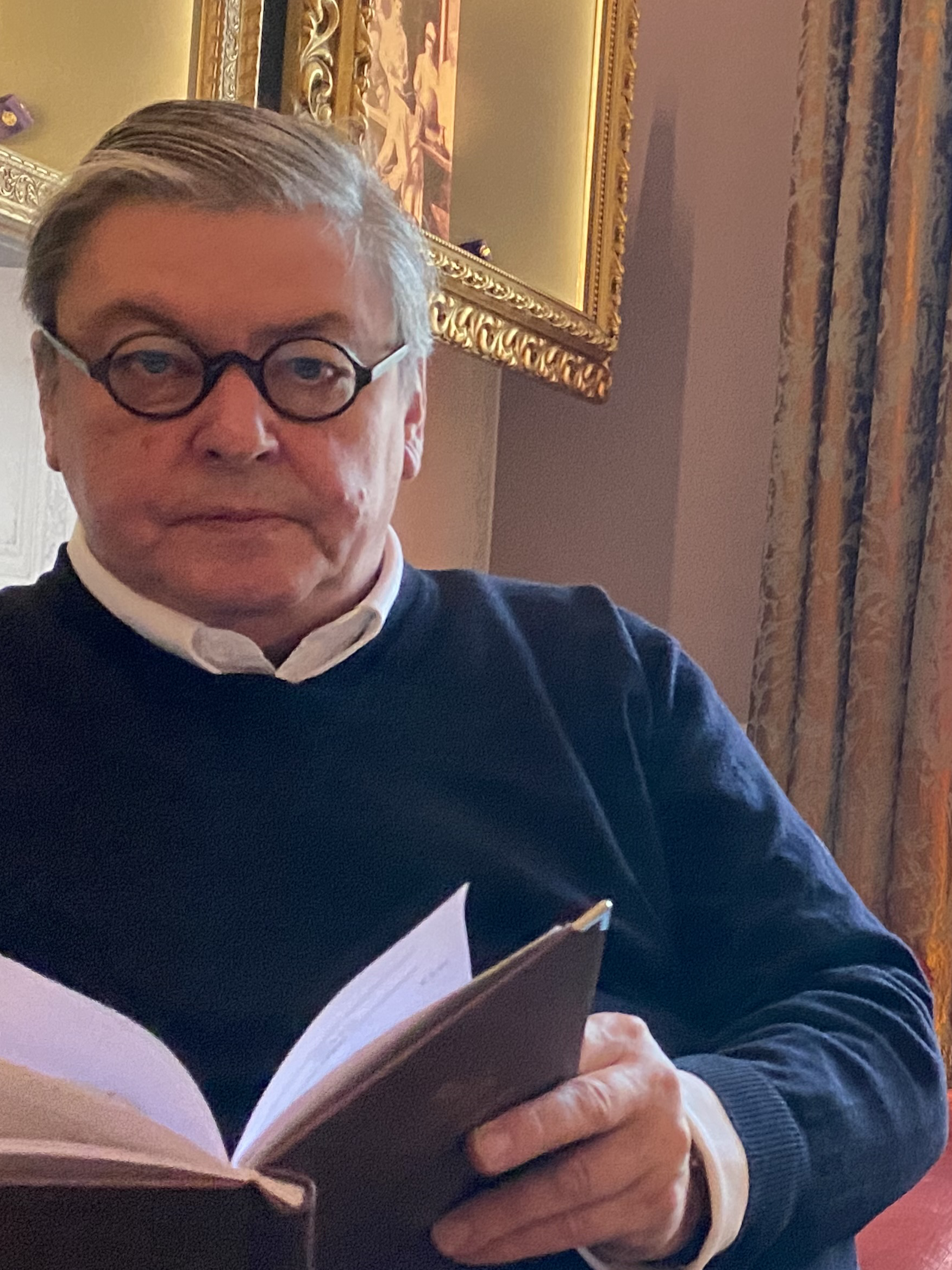
- Folkers in 2022
- Born: Gerd Folkers; 25 March 1953 (age 73); Andernach, Germany
- Education: University of Bonn
- Known for: Computer-aided drug design, transdisciplinarity, science policy advisory
- Spouse: Stefanie Rousek Folkers
- Children: 1
- Awards: Reichstein Medaille (2013), Phoenix Pharmazie Wissenschaftspreis (1996, 2001), Emil Votocek Medal (2012)
- Scientific career
- Fields: Pharmaceutical chemistry, science studies, molecular design
- Workplaces: ETH Zurich, Collegium Helveticum, University of Tübingen
- Thesis: Struktur-Wirkungs-Untersuchungen an Pyrrolo-Pyrimidinen (1980)
- Doctoral advisor: H. J. Roth
- Website: www.gerdfolkers.com

Gerd Folkers (born 25 March 1953) is a German–Swiss pharmaceutical scientist, science theorist and professor emeritus of Pharmacy and Science Studies at ETH Zurich. He is recognized for his contributions to computer-aided molecular design and his later work in the philosophy and sociology of science. He served as the Director of the center for advanced studies Collegium Helveticum from 2004 to 2015 and as President of the Swiss Science Council (SSC) from 2016 to 2019.

== Early life and education ==
Folkers was born in Andernach, Germany. He completed his secondary education at the Kurfürst Salentin Gymnasium in 1973. From 1973 to 1977, he studied pharmaceutical sciences at the University of Bonn, passing the state examination in 1978. He earned his doctorate (Dr. rer. nat.) in 1980 with a dissertation on the structure-activity relationships of pyrrolopyrimidines under the supervision of H. J. Roth. In 1989, he completed his Habilitation in pharmaceutical chemistry at the University of Tübingen, focusing on the molecular mechanisms of antiviral agents.

== Career ==
Folkers began his academic career as a research assistant in Bonn and later at the University of Tübingen (1983–1991). During this time, he conducted research stays at the University of Bern with H.-D. Höltje, Texas A&M University, and Birkbeck, University of London, where he specialized in protein crystallography and computer aided molecular design.

In 1991, he was appointed Professor of Pharmaceutical Chemistry at ETH Zurich. Under his leadership, the chair became a center for structure-based drug design. In 2004, he transitioned to the leadership of the Collegium Helveticum, the institute of advanced studies shared by ETH Zurich and the University of Zurich. In 2015, he was appointed Professor of Science Studies at ETH Zurich's Department of Humanities, Social and Political Sciences. Together with Lino Guzzela, he co-founded and led the Critical Thinking ETH, an initiative fostering critical thinking and an open debating culture in science. He retired as professor emeritus in 2018.

=== Policy and Advisory Roles ===
- Swiss Science Council (SSC): Appointed by the Federal Council as a member in 2012, he served as President from 2016 to 2019, advising the government on education, research, and innovation policy.
- Swiss National Science Foundation (SNSF): Member of the National Research Council from 2003 to 2011.
- Novartis Research Foundation: Served as President of the Board of Trustees (until 2025).

== Research and scientific work ==
Folkers' early research was instrumental in establishing computer-aided molecular design (CAMD) in Switzerland, particularly for personalized cancer therapies. However, his later work at the Collegium Helveticum focused on the "Theory of the Experiment" and the role of intuition and visualization in scientific discovery. He has been a vocal proponent of "Critical Thinking" in university curricula, arguing that scientists must understand the historical and social context of their data.

Together with the Swiss photographer Hans Danuser, Folkers initiated the restoration of the Villa Garbald, situated in Castasegna and designed by Gottfried Semper, and its reuse as remote convention center by the ETH Zürich. He directed the Cortona Week (2015–2017), an international retreat for doctoral students focused on the integration of science, art, and spirituality. He also founded and edited the ETH Zurich's multidisciplinary magazine 42, paralleling the “Critical Thinking Initiative” and exploring the limits of scientific knowledge.

== Author, illustrator and novelist ==
Since transitioning to emeritus status in 2018, Folkers has increasingly focused on literary and philosophical narratives that bridge the gap between material history, social observation, and the natural sciences.

In Faustmanns Hypsometer (2022), he uses a historical instrument from his own collection to explore the epistemological shift from physical, haptic measurement to digital abstraction, reflecting on how tools shape human perception of reality.

His 2023 work, Linie 13, a sketchbook, documents reflections on Zurich’s urban landscape and society and the "normality" of everyday life through the lens of a recurring tram commute.

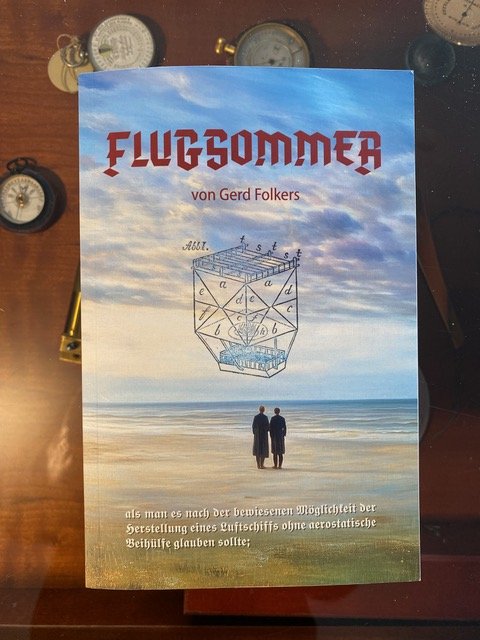
Cover of Flugsommer (2025)

In Flugsommer (2025), Folkers further expands his literary repertoire with a narrative which puts the Biedermeier period into perspective. The novella describes the historically documented rivalry between two young men over the financing of their flying machine. The story is set in Nuremberg in 1835.

== Personal life ==
Folkers is married to Stefanie Rousek Folkers; the couple has one daughter. He is a bibliophile with a significant collection of early science fiction and historical scientific texts. His interest in the "material culture of science" extends to a collection of 19th-century measuring instruments, which he uses to study the evolution of accuracy and perception in research.

== Awards and honours ==
- 2012: Emil Votocek Medal, University of Chemistry and Technology, Prague.
- 2013: Reichstein Medaille, Swiss Academy of Pharmaceutical Sciences (SAPHW).

== Selected publications ==
- Wernery, Jannis; Atmanspacher, Harald; Kornmeier, Jürgen; Candia, Victor; Folkers, Gerd; Wittmann, Marc (2015-01-01). "Temporal Processing in Bistable Perception of the Necker Cube". Perception. 44 (2): 157–168. doi:10.1068/p7780. ISSN 0301-0066.
- Pospisil, Pavel; Ballmer, Patrick; Scapozza, Leonardo; Folkers, Gerd (2003-01-01). "Tautomerism in Computer‐Aided Drug Design". Journal of Receptors and Signal Transduction. 23 (4): 361–371. doi:10.1081/rrs-120026975. ISSN 1079-9893.
- Folkers, Gerd; Trumpp-Kallmeyer, Susanne; Gutbrod, Oliver; Krickl, Sabine; Fetzer, Jürgen; Keil, Günther M. (1991-10-01). "Computer-aided active-site-directed modeling of the Herpes Simplex Virus 1 and human thymidine kinase". Journal of Computer-Aided Molecular Design. 5 (5): 385–404. doi:10.1007/bf00125660. ISSN 0920-654X.
- Sieroka, Norman; Otto, Vivianne I.; Folkers, Gerd (2018-10-15). "Guest Editorial: Critical Thinking in Education and Research—Why and How?". Angewandte Chemie International Edition. 57 (51): 16574–16575. doi:10.1002/anie.201810397. ISSN 1433-7851.
- Folkers, Gerd; Guzzela, Lino. "The Future of Universities in a Digital Era". www.diplomaticourier.com.
- Folkers, Gerd; Folkers, Laura (2016-12-12). "On computable numbers". Infozine. S1: 41–42. doi:10.3929/ethz-a-010745043.
- Folkers, Gerd (2016-10-10), "On Re-Positioning", The Power of Distributed Perspectives, De Gruyter, pp. 189–214, ISBN 978-3-11-049335-1
- Folkes, Gerd (2013). ""Economization" in Science". “Economization” in Science and of Science Itself: Changes to the Game. Swiss Science and Technology Council. p. 42. ISBN 978-3-906113-05-0.
