= Swiss Science Council =

- (in German) Schweizerische Wissenschaftsrat, SWR (in French) Conseil suisse de la science, CSS (in Italian) Consiglio svizzero della scienza, CSS

Agency overview
- Headquarters: Bern
- Employees: 11
- Agency executive: President Sabine Süsstrunk
- Parent department: State Secretariat for Education, Research and Innovation
- Website: wissenschaftsrat.ch

The Swiss Science Council (SSC) is an independent scientific advisory body of the Federal Council of Switzerland. Founded on March 26, 1965, the SSC advises the Swiss federal government on all issues relating to science, higher education, research and innovation policy. Between 2000 and 2013, the advisory body was called Swiss Science and Technology Council, and from 2014 to 2017 Swiss Science and Innovation Council (SSIC). Since 2018, it has returned to its original name.

The SSC is administratively attached to the State Secretariat for Education, Research and Innovation.

== Organization ==
The SSC is an extra-parliamentary commission, as formulated in Articles 54 and 55 of the Federal Law on the Promotion of Research and Innovation.

The council consists of a maximum of 15 members (scientists and innovators from various disciplines). As of 2021, Sabine Süsstrunk acts as SSC president. The administrative office of the SSC includes scientific advisors, an information service and administrative staff. The office is led by Lukas Zollinger.

== Tasks ==
The SSC advises the federal government in order to fostering the "continuous optimisation of the framework conditions for the flourishing development of the Swiss education, research and innovation landscape". The council regularly publishes reports and studies on current science policy issues.

It issues statements on individual projects or problems in the field of education, research and innovation (ERI) on behalf of the Federal Council of Switzerland or on its own initiative and also acts as an evaluation body. The Information Service compiles information on topics in the area of ERI in Switzerland and abroad.

The Working Programme 2024–2027 is focusing on the following thematic areas: "Facing the Challenges of our Time", "Governance of Education, Research and Innovation in an (Inter-)national Context", and "Research and Innovation of the Future". The Working Programme also includes evaluations, reviews and impact assessments.

== Presidents ==
- Max Imboden (1965–1968)
- Karl Schmid (1969–1972)
- Hugo Aebi (1973–1978)
- Gerhard Huber (1979–1982)
- Peter Saladin (1983, ad interim)
- Bernhard Schnyder (1984–1987)
- Verena Meyer (1988–1999)
- Gottfried Schatz (2000–2003)
- Susanne Suter (2004–2011)
- Astrid Epiney (2012–2015)
- Gerd Folkers (2016–2020)
- Sabine Süsstrunk (2021–present)

== See also ==
- Science and technology in Switzerland
