= Sabine Süsstrunk =

Computer scientist

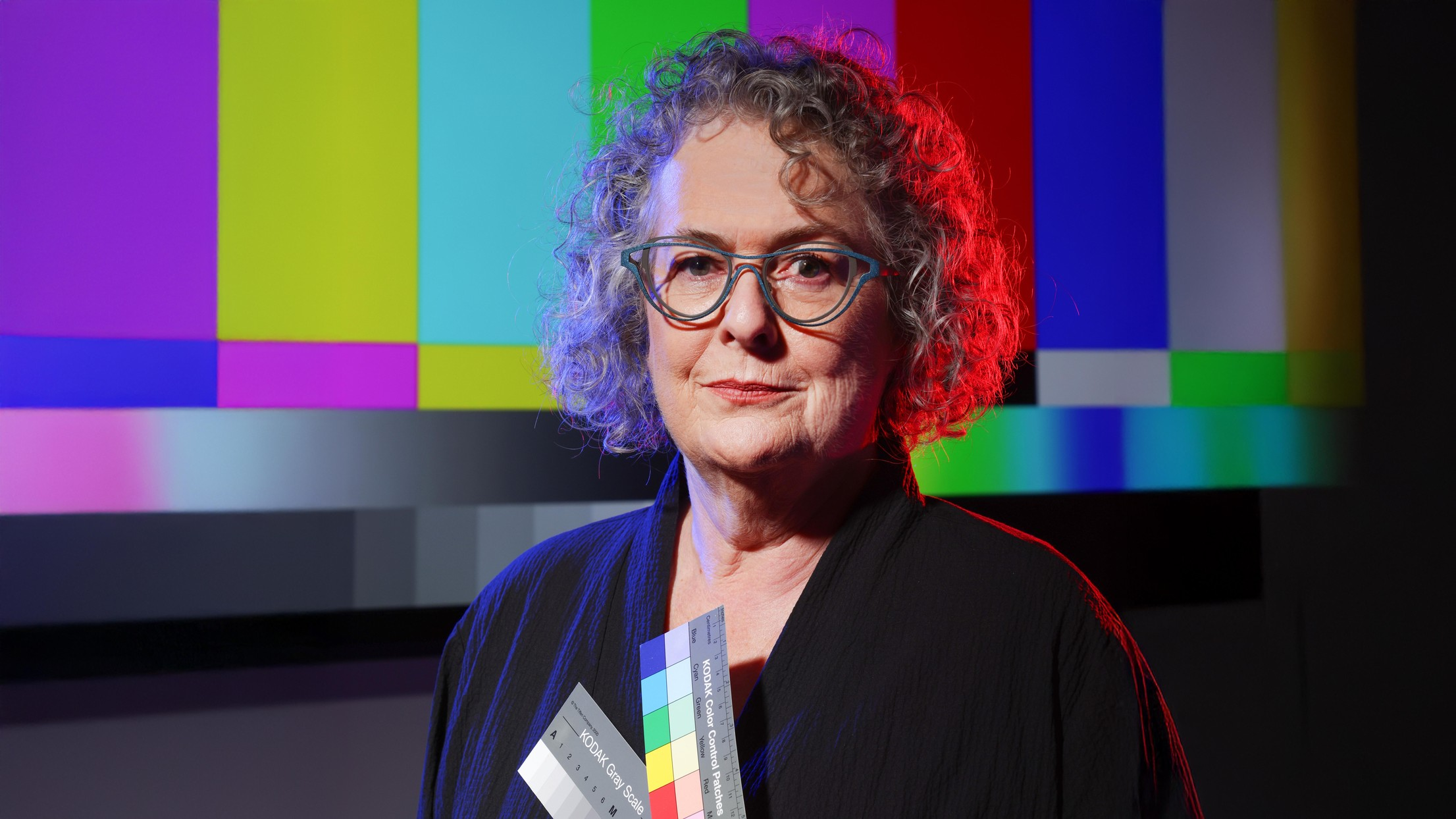
Süsstrunk in 2025

Sabine Süsstrunk is a computer scientist and professor at Ecole Polytechnique Fédérale de Lausanne (EPFL) in Switzerland, where she leads the Images and Visual Representation Lab and serves as Dean in the School of Computer and Communication Sciences. Her research areas are in computational imaging and computational photography, color image processing (including spectral sensitivity) and computer vision, and image quality and computational aesthetics. She is a fellow of the Institute of Electrical and Electronics Engineers and Society for Imaging Science and Technology and received the Society of Imaging Science and Technology and International Society for Optics and Photonics 2013 Electronic Imaging Scientist of the Year Award.

From 2015 to 2020, Süsstrunk was the first director of the Digital Humanities Institute in the College of Humanities at EPFL, and the first director of the Master of Science in the Digital Humanities program. In 2025, Süsstrunk was appointed Dean of the School of Computer and Communication Sciences, succeeding Rüdiger Urbanke.

From 2016 to 2020, Süsstrunk was a member of the Foundation Council and Executive Committee of the Swiss National Science Foundation. Furthermore, she acted as President of the EPFL WISH Foundation (2014-2018) where she is still member of the board. On January 1, 2018, she joined the Board of Directors of the Swiss Broadcasting Corporation. As of 2021, Süsstrunk is the president of the Swiss Science Council.
