= Hans Danuser =

Swiss artist and photographer (1953–2024)

Hans Danuser (19 March 1953 – 26 August 2024) was a Swiss artist and photographer. His first major work, the cycle In Vivo, brought him international fame, therein he broke several societal taboos with respect to genetic research and nuclear physics. Since the 1990s, in addition to his photographic studies, Danuser has focused increasingly on transdisciplinary (research) projects in the arts and sciences.

== Oeuvre ==
Danuser had been invited to contribute to international events such as the biennales in Venice and Lyon. He is one of the first photographers to have taken the conceptually compelling step of presenting his large-format tableaux on the floor in a museum exhibition. In the 1980s Danuser embarked on his cycle In Vivo, completing it in 1989. Contemporaneously he produced architectural photographs in the project Partituren und Bilder/Scores and Pictures. In 1990 Danuser won the competition for the large-scale design of the walls at the University of Zurich-Irchel, which led to the Institutsbilder (1992). He later completed another project in an architectural context, the Schiefertafel Beverin (2000–2001). The Frozen Embryo Series, made in the 1990s, a follow-up of In Vivo, also prefigured two ongoing works, The Erosion Project and Entscheidungsfindung – Decision taking.

== Biography ==
Danuser was born in Chur on 19 March 1953. After working in Zürich for the German advertising and fashion photographer Michael Lieb from 1972 to 1974, Danuser began experimenting with light-sensitive emulsion at the ETH Zurich.

- 1979–1989: work on the cycle In Vivo
- 1980s and 1990s: working in Zürich and New York
- 1986: Artist in residence in Los Alamos.
- Since the 1990s: large-format series of photographs as installations in space and transdisciplinary projects in the arts and sciences.
- Spring 2009: first Visiting Artist at the Centre for Studies in the Theory and History of Photography at the Institute of Art History of the University of Zurich and subsequently visiting professor at the ETH Zurich.

In collaboration with Swiss-German pharmaceutical scientist Gerd Folkers, Danuser established the Fondazione Garbald to oversee the restoration of the Villa Garbald. Located in Castasegna and designed by the German architect Gottfried Semper, the villa was subsequently repurposed as a remote seminar and convention center. Today, the facility serves primarily as a retreat for ETH Zürich.

Danuser was primarily based in Zürich.

Danuser died on 30 August 2024, at the age of 71.

== Series and projects ==
=== Out of Paradies ===
The series of works consists of found and staged stencil paintings, created by means of paint-spray cans on different supports, at the intersection of public and private space. They have been photographed since the 1980s in various cities in Europe and the United States. The ephemeral in the existence of the stencil images on physical substrates is taken up by Danuser's photography and transformed by means of digital image processing and sublimation printing technique on aluminum, into images that in their brilliantly reflective appearance, suggest ephemeral and digital screen surfaces (Peer 2019).

- Out of Paradies (1980s–2019)

=== Matographs – The-One-Million-Pound-Project ===
The Matographs – The-One-Million-Pound-Projekt (work in progress) was developed with the research departments of Ciba-Geigy (today Novartis), Basel, and Bayer Werke / Agfa Gevaert, Leverkusen (today AGFA). By patenting "matographs," a new photographic process, Danuser pursued the goal of being able to "process [a] substrate with color according to [his] ideas before coating it with a photographic black-and-white emulsion (Sadkowsky 2018, 7), in contrast to commercially available photographic papers, which have a white layer support. Thus, at the turn from analog to digital photography, he succeeds in "introduce[ing] a new perspective, namely direct[ing] the photographer's gaze to the otherwise unnoticed background [of a photographic print]."(Folkers, 2018, 86).

- The Party is over (1984/2016)
- Matographs and Volcanoes (1996–2018)
- AT Matographs (1997)
- Matographs, part I (1993–1996)

==== Previous work ====
- Delta (1990–1996)

=== Entscheidungsfindung – Decision taking ===
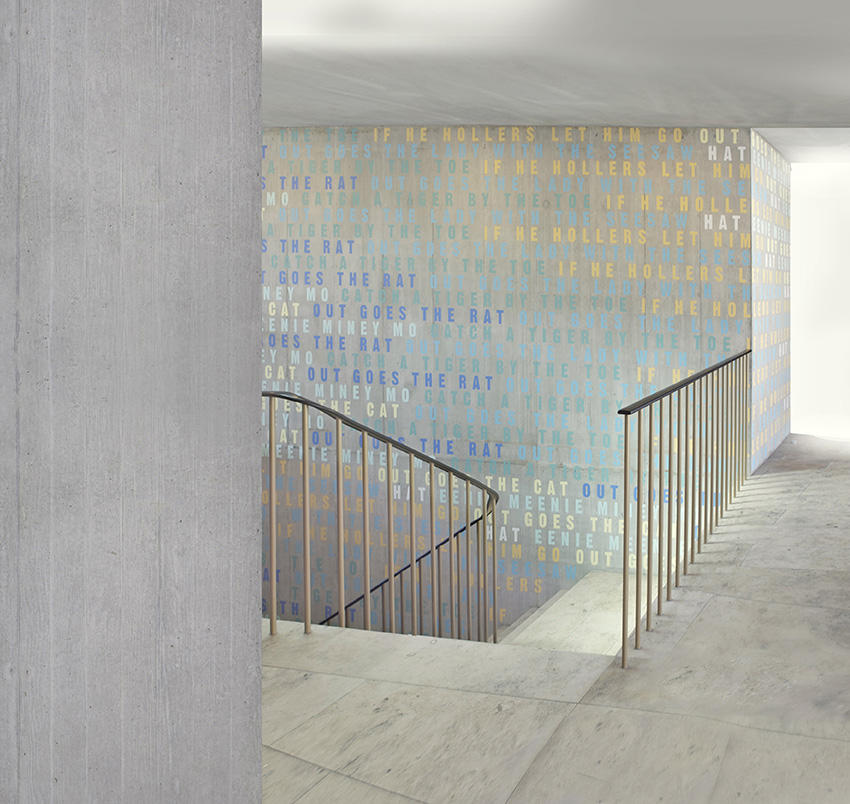
Danuser, Akka Bakka, 2013, art-in-architecture project, Department of Health, canton of Zürich

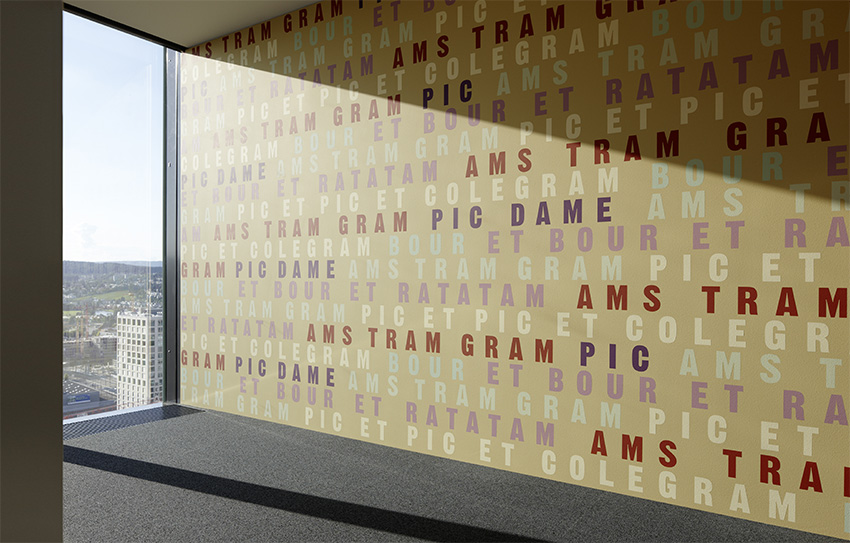
Danuser, Piff Paff Puff, 2010/2011, art-in-architecture project, Prime Tower, Zürich

The Counting Out Rhymes project on the subject of Entscheidungsfindung – Decision taking (work in progress) involves video stations and art-in-architecture. Danuser is interested in the approaches and models used in taking decisions as a social and political instrument, ranging from mathematical theory to the practical counting-out rhymes of children. The rhymes – "a mixtum compositum of reason and imagination" – are as significant as mathematical formulae and physical laws inasmuch as they are grounded in “nonrational processes of taking decisions” and therefore reflect the fundamental structure of contemporary models of thought.

- Joggeli (Nationale Suisse, Basel, 2014)
- Akka Bakka (Zürich Department of Health, 2013)
- Piff Paff Puff (Prime Tower, 2010–2012)
- Insert-Du (2009)
- Video installation (since 2008)

==== Previous work ====
- Wildwechsel (1993)

=== The Erosion Project ===
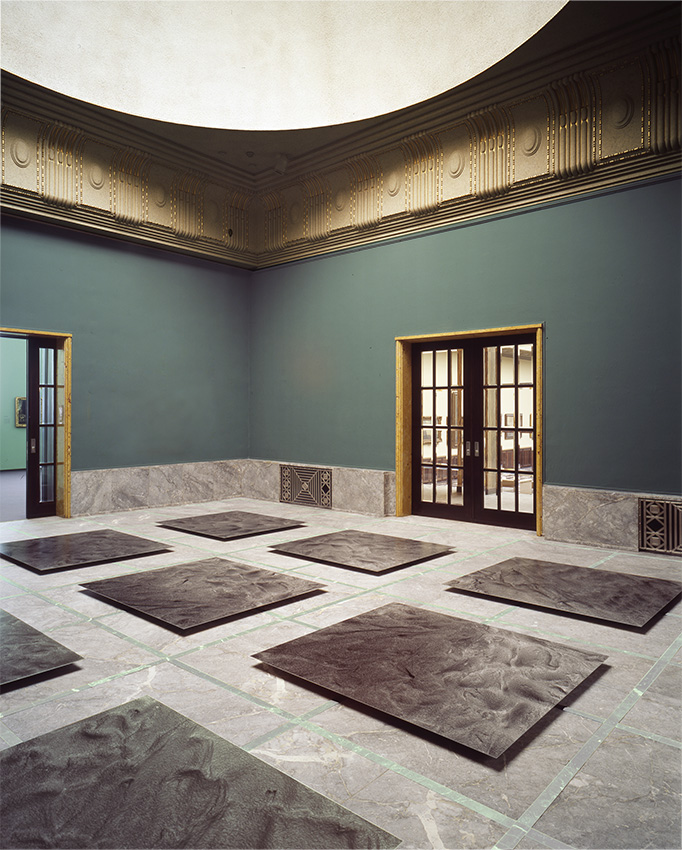
Danuser, Erosion III – a floor installation, 2000–2006, 9 parts (III 1–III 9), photographs on baryta paper, each 150 x 140 cm, installation in the Kunsthaus Zürich (Böcklin hall).

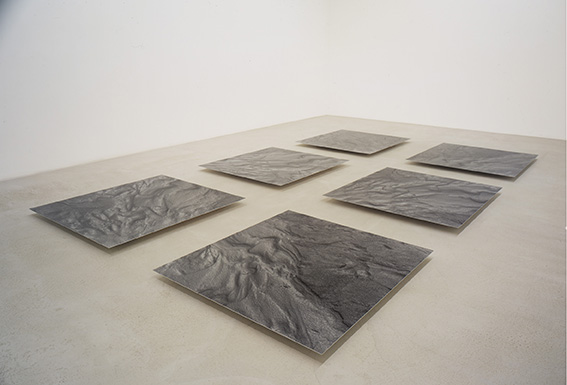
Danuser, Erosion II – a floor installation, 2000–2006, 6 parts (II 1–II 6), photographs on baryta paper, each 150 x 140 cm, installation in the Fotomuseum Winterthur.

The Erosion Project (work in progress) conducts research into the erosion of natural and cultivated landscapes which takes the shape of a clear, reduced aesthetic. 'The project consists of three series: floor installations, Erosion I-VII (2000–2006); Modeling Erosion (2003–2007), created in collaboration with the ETH Zurich Institute of Geotechnical Engineering; and Landschaft in Bewegung/Moving Landscape (2008–), a collaboration with the ETHZ Laboratory of Inorganic Chemistry as part of the research project Farbe und Fotografie/Colour and Photography. Earlier works were seminal to the series, specifically Landschaften (1993–1996) and the art-in-architecture project Schiefertafel Beverin (2001).

- Erosion I-VII (2000–2006)
- Modeling Erosion (2003–2007)
- Landschaft in Bewegung/Moving Landscape (since 2008)

==== Previous work ====
- Landschaften (1993–1996)
- Strangled Bodies (1995, 2001)
- Schiefertafel Beverin (2000–2001)

=== Frozen Embryo Series ===
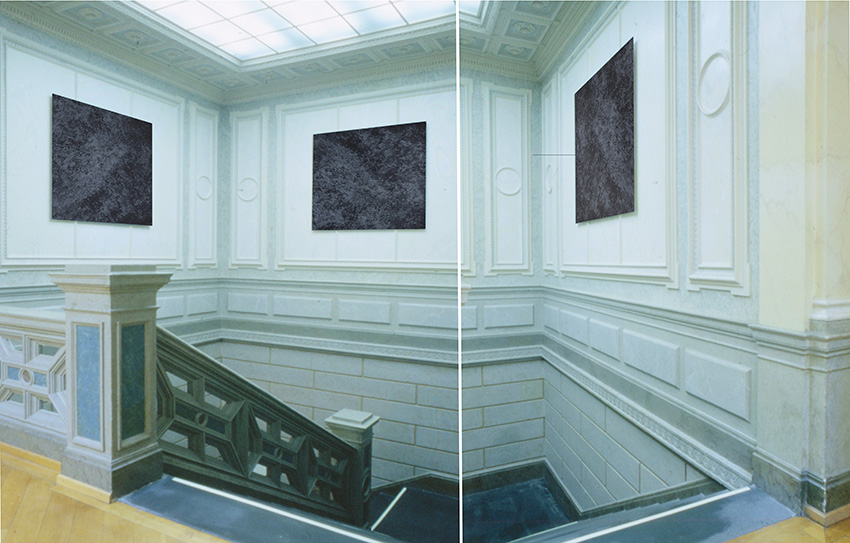
Danuser, Frozen Embryo Installation, Bündner Kunstmuseum, 2000, photographs on baryta paper, 3-part, each 141 x 150 cm, installation in the Villa Planta atrium and staircase to the permanent collection exhibition on the first floor.

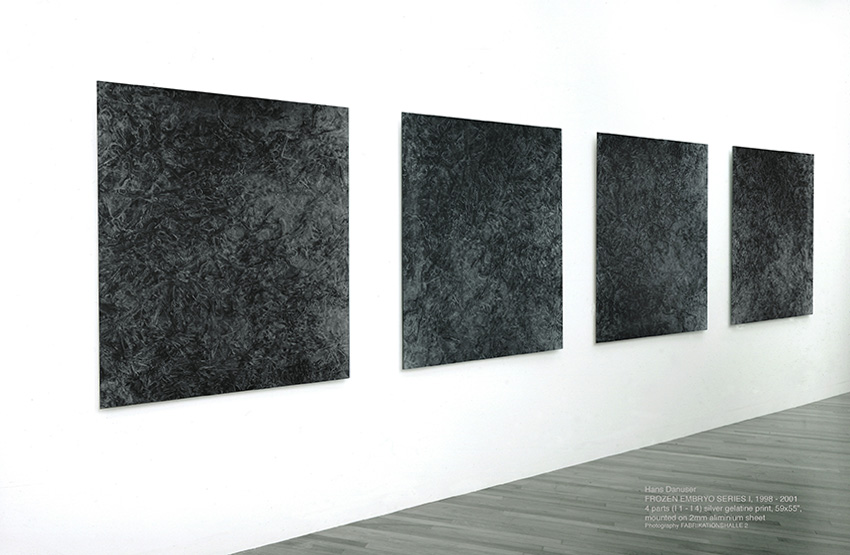
Danuser, Frozen Embryo Series I, 1998–2001, 4-part (I1–I4), silver gelatine, 59 x 55 cm, photography: Fabrikationshalle 2.

The photographs in the Frozen Embryo Series (1996–2000) have their origins in medical laboratories and gene research. These works find Danuser playing with the opportunities presented by analogue photography: he takes a single negative (which he calls the “original”) and, by turning and mirroring it in the darkroom, generates from it a number of other images, which he calls “one-offs”. To reinforce this impression, Danuser chose the square as format for his images, slightly stretched to 140 cm x 150 cm. The Frozen Embryo Series was first shown at the Kunsthaus Zürich in 1996. Günter Metken writes in the exhibition catalogue: “Without being explicit, Hans Danuser's work addresses the classical problem – and paradox – of painting: the perception of nature and its reproduction, the tension between surface and depth, volume and two-dimensionality, foreground and background, microscopy and totality, vision and the sense of touch. The artist actualises these issues and yet his stream of drifting shapes reminds us of Monet's Water Lilies. Our gaze wanders, roams, follows winding shapes in an ecstasy of sensual expansion and refinement.”

- Frozen-Embryo-Installation (1996)

=== Scores and Pictures ===
1988 found Danuser for the first time showing the pictures in the Architekturgalerie Luzern under the title Partituren und Bilder (Scores and Pictures), which he had been commissioned to photograph by the Pritzker prizewinning architect Peter Zumthor in 1986–1988: the Atelier des Architekten (Architect's studio) in Haldenstein, the Schutzbauten über römischen Funden (protective pavilions above Roman finds) in Chur and the Kapelle Sogn Benedetg (Chapel of St. Benedict) in the Surselva region of Canton Graubünden. The artist-cum-photographer was given carte blanche by the architect. In his essay in the book Zumthor sehen. Bilder von Hans Danuser – Nachdenken über Architektur und Fotografie, Philip Ursprung, professor of contemporary art and architectural history, discusses the impact that Danuser's photographs in Partituren und Bilder exerted on the depiction of architecture in photography: “With his photographs of Sogn Benedetg, Danuser radically altered the conventions of architectural photography. Instead of neutral documentation, he was interested in personal interpretation. And instead of reducing the phenomenon to a photograph, he as it were dismantled the building into its component parts, like a short film, which breaks the subject down into sequences and shows it from different perspectives; today one would call this performative. These fragments offer the observer the opportunity to reconstruct the building in the imagination.”

- Partituren und Bilder. Architektonische Arbeiten aus dem Atelier Peter Zumthor (1985–1988) (Score and Pictures. Architectural work from the studio of Peter Zumthor)
- Peter Zumthor, Therme Vals, in Zusammenarbeit mit Fritz Hauser, Sounding Stones Therme Vals (1996) (Peter Zumthor, Vals Thermal Baths, in collaboration with Fritz Hauser, Sounding Stones Vals Thermal Baths)
- Zumthor sehen. Bilder von Hans Danuser (2009) (Looking at Zumthor, Pictures by Danuser)

=== In Vivo ===
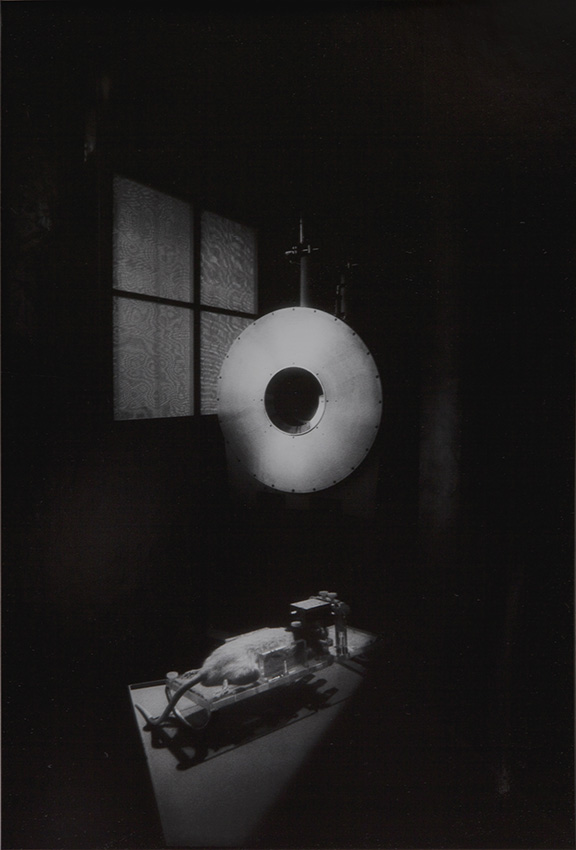
Danuser, In Vivo, 1980–1989, Chemie I (VI 1), photographs on baryta paper, 50 x 40 cm. Settings: pharmacology and chemistry research, analysis and production facilities.

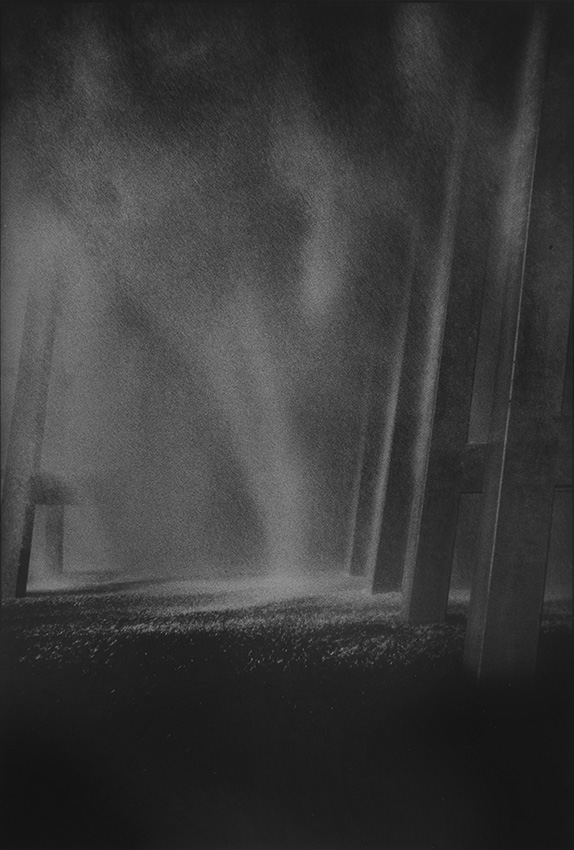
Danuser, In Vivo, 1980–1989, A-Energie (I 1), photographs on baryta paper, 50 x 40 cm. Settings: nuclear power, reactor research and radioactive waste facilities.

Danuser worked for ten years on seven series of images, which he compiled in 1989 under the title In Vivo and presented to the public for the first time at the Kunstmuseum Aarau; the exhibition was curated by Beat Wismer. Taken in Europe and the US, the photographs in In Vivo are arranged in seven sections: A-Energie, Medizin I, Gold, Medizin II, Chemie I, Los Alamos, Chemie II (Nuclear Energy, Medicine I, Gold, Medicine II, Chemistry I, Los Alamos, Chemistry II). Depicting a variety of workplaces in research and production facilities, the work affords insights into taboo areas of late-industrial Western society without showing the people themselves. The images gauge the ambivalence of photography between documentation and fiction. The work has appeared in a book published by Lars Müller in 1989, also titled In Vivo.

- In Vivo (1980–1989), 93 black-and-white photographs

== Publications ==
=== Selected publications and artist books / primary literature ===
- Bündner Kunstmuseum Chur (ed.), Hans Danuser – Drei Fotoserien Chur: Bündner Kunstmuseum 1985.
- Hans Danuser, Partituren und Bilder. Architektonische Arbeiten aus dem Atelier Peter Zumthor 1985–1988. (Publication accompanied eponymous exhibition, Architekturgalerie Luzern 2–23 October 1988, Haus der Architektur Graz, 27 July-18 August 1989). Lucerne: Architekturgalerie, 1988
- Aargauer Kunsthaus (ed.), Hans Danuser – In Vivo – 93 Fotografien. In Vivo. Baden: Lars Müller, 1989
- Bündner Kunstmuseum Chur (ed.), Hans Danuser. Wildwechsel. Baden: Lars Müller 1993.
- Reto Hänny, Helldunkel. Ein Bilderbuch. Frankfurt: Suhrkamp, 1994
- Delta. Fotografien 1990–1996. (Publication accompanied eponymous exhibition: Kunsthaus Zürich: 12 April–23 June 1996). Baden: Lars Müller, 1996
- Nidwaldner Museum et al. (eds.), Hans Danuser. AT (accompanied exhibition, Im Höfli, Stans, 26 October–21 December 1997), Stans, 1997.
- Danuser (photography) and Urs Stahel (text), Frost. (supplement to publication accompanying the eponymous exhibition, Fotomuseum Winterthur: 9 November 2001 – 6 January 2002). Zürich: Scalo, 2001.
- Hartmut Böhme in conversation with Hans Danuser, Die Oberflächen sind niemals stabil. In: Die neue Sichtbarkeit des Todes. eds. Thomas Macho and Kristin Marek, Berlin, with image documentation on Danuser's In Vivo, Frozen Embryo Series, Strangled Body, Erosion. Munich: Wilhelm Fink, 2008 pp. 239–273.
- Flurina Paravicini et al. (eds.), Hans Danuser – The Counting Out Rhymes Project über Entscheidungs Findung / Decision Taking, with texts by Ursula Pia Jauch and Beat Stutzer and a screen print insert by Danuser. Lucerne: Periferia, 2008.
- Hans Danuser, Entscheidungsfindung, with texts by Stefan Zweifel, Gerd Folkers and Stefan Kaiser and a conversation between the artist and Andrew D. Barbour. In: DU – Periodical for Art and Culture, issue 795/April 2009, pp. 80–107.
- Zumthor sehen. Bilder von Hans Danuser, with an essay by Philip Ursprung and a conversation between Köbi Gantenbein and Danuser. Zürich: Hochparterre bei Scheidegger & Spiess, 2009.
- Hans Danuser, Erosion und Landschaft in Bewegung, with a conversation between Christian Kerez and Danuser. In: trans 20, 2012, gta, Zürich.
- Wulf Rössler, Danuser (eds.), Burg aus Holz – das Burghölzli. Von der Irrenheilanstalt zur Psychiatrischen Universitätsklinik Zürich. Entwicklungen, Innen- und Aussensichten. NZZ Libro, Zürich 2013, ISBN 978-3-03823-739-6.
- Danuser, Bettina Gockel (eds.), Die Neuerfindung der Fotografie. Hans Danuser – Gespräche, Materialien, Analysen (Studies in Theory and History of Photography 4). Berlin/Boston: De Gruyter 2014.

=== Selected secondary literature ===
- Urs Stahel and Guido Magnaguagno, Neue Schweizer Photographen. In: DU – Periodical for Art and Culture 8, 1985, Zürich, pp. 24–67.
- Günter Metken: Die Bilder der Dinge: Die von der Oberfläche der Körper wie Häutchen sich schälen. In: Hans Danuser – Delta. (Publication accompanied eponymous exhibition: Kunsthaus Zürich: 12 April–23 June 1996). Baden: Lars Müller, 1996.
- Thilo König: Hans Danuser – ‘Frost’. In: Kunstforum International no. 159 (April–May) 2002, pp. 416–417.
- Beat Stutzer, Schärfe und Beharrlichkeit – zu den Bildern von Hans Danuser. In: Bündner Jahrbuch 2003. Chur: 2003.
- Suzann-Viola Renninger: Ene, mene, mei. Der Künstler Hans Danuser. In: Schweizer Monatshefte. Periodical for politics, business and culture, issue 01/02, January/February 2007, p. 4
- Gisela Kuoni, Hans Danuser ‘Auszählen – The Counting Out Rhymes Project’. In: Kunstbulletin, 11/2008, Zürich, pp. 72–73.
- Marco Baschera, Von der vorzeitlichen Präsenz eine Platzes. In: Präsenzerfahrung in Literatur und Kunst / Beiträge zu einem Schlüsselbegriff der ästhetischen und poetologischen Diskussion. With a picture insert on Danuser – Schiefertafel Beverin. Munich: Wilhelm Fink 2008, pp. 75–100.
- Bettina Gockel, Uncalibrated: From the Standpoint of Color — Hans Danuser. In: Bettina Gockel (ed.), Colors of Photography (Studies in Theory and History of Photography 10). Berlin/Boston: De Gruyter 2021, pp. 173–200.

== Selected solo exhibitions ==
- 1985: Kunstmuseum Graubünden, Chur ("Drei Fotoserien")
- 1986: Gewerbemuseum Basel ("Drei Fotoserien")
- 1986: Photoforum PasquArt, Biel
- 1988: Architekturgalerie, Lucerne ("Partituren und Bilder. Architektonische Arbeiten aus dem Atelier Peter Zumthor 1985–1988")
- 1989: Aargauer Kunsthaus, Aarau ("In Vivo")
- 1990: Curt Marcus Gallery, New York ("Photographs")
- 1991: Städtische Galerie im Lenbachhaus, Munich ("In Vivo")
- 1993: Bündner Kunstmuseum, Chur ("Wildwechsel")
- 1996: Kunsthaus Zürich, Zürich ("Delta. Photographs 1990–1996")
- 1998: Kunstmuseum Nidwalden, Stans ("AT")
- 1999: Walter Merian Haus, Basel ("Nah und Fern")
- 2001: Fotomuseum Winterthur, Winterthur ("Frost")
- 2003: Scalo Galerie, New York ("Frozen")
- 2003: Galerie Luciano Fasciati, Chur ("Modeling Erosion")
- 2005: Villa Garbald, Castasegna ("Projekt Garbald")
- 2006: Moscow House of Photography, Big Manesh, Moscow ("Erosion")
- 2008: Galerie Luciano Fasciati, Chur ("Auszählen – The Counting Out Rhymes Project")
- 2009: Galerie Luciano Fasciati, Chur ("Nachdenken über Fotografie und Architektur")
- 2012: Semper Sternwarte, ETH Zurich ("Ein Colloquium der Dinge")
- 2014: Municipio Bregaglia, Promontogno ("Uccelin gion fond dal mer")

== Awards ==
- 1987: Canton Graubünden Recognition Award for Visual Arts
- 1992: Manor Kunstpreis
- 1996: Conrad Ferdinand Meyer Prize for Young Art
- 2001: Canton Graubünden Culture Prize

=== Stipends and studio awards ===
- 1974, 1976, 1983, 1985: Federal art stipend/Swiss Art Award
- 1979, 1983, 1985: Study and work grants from Canton of Zürich
- 1985: Art stipend for a residency at the City of Zürich studio in New York
- 1983, 1984, 1985: Art stipend from the City of Zürich
- 1991: Art stipend for a residency at the Landis & Gyr Foundation studio in London
- 1996: Artist in Residence at Los Alamos Laboratories, New Mexico, USA

== Film and television ==
- Michael Hegglin, Der Fotokünstler Hans Danuser und seine Arbeit im öffentlichen Raum. In: 10vor10 on Swiss TV SF DRS, 1993.
- Michael Hegglin, Zeichen im Dunkel – Hans Danuser. In: Swiss TV SF DRS and TV broadcaster 3sat, April 1996.
- Barbara Seiler, Landscape in Movement – in conversation with the artist and photographer Danuser. In: Sternstunde, Swiss TV SF TV, 18 January 2009 and 24 January 2009, video 52 min. 16 secs.: Camera, Christine Munz // Sound, Michael Ryffel // Editor and music Brian Burmann // Director René Baumann // Head of production Rahel Holenstein // SF TV editor, Marion Bornschier, a coproduction by Videoladen Zürich / Sternstunden, Swiss TV SF TV, Zürich // Cinema premiere at Kino Canva as part of the Solothurner Filmtage programme, 2009.
