= Martina Hirayama =

German-Swiss chemist, university lecturer

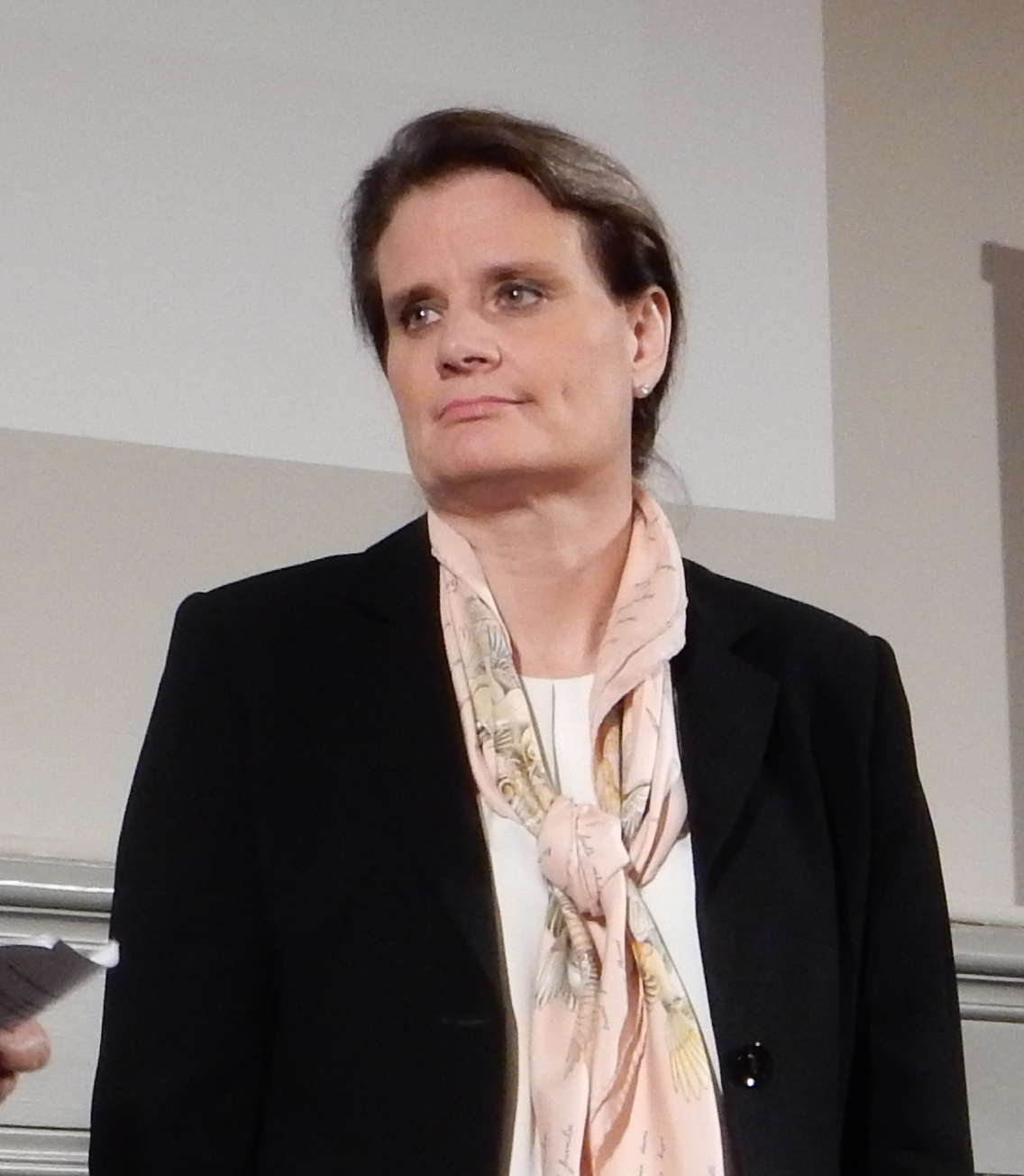
Image of Martina Hirayama

Martina Hirayama (born 1970) is a German-Swiss chemist, university lecturer and, since 2019, State Secretary for Education, Research and Innovation (SBFI) in Switzerland.

== Life and work ==
Martina Hirayama grew up and went to school in Germany. She studied chemistry at the University of Fribourg (Switzerland) from 1990 to 1991 and at the Swiss Federal Institute of Technology (ETH Zurich) in Zurich from 1991 to 1994. She completed her diploma thesis on polymers at Imperial College London in 1994. She then returned to ETH Zurich, where she completed her doctorate in 1997 at the Institute for Polymers on the "Production and characterization of thin and ultra-thin layers on inorganic surfaces by oxidative addition and activation of chemically reactive bonds" and worked as a research assistant. From 2001, she was head of the "Polymers on Surfaces" group at the Institute of Polymers. Hirayama also completed a postgraduate degree in business administration – now called MAS in Management, Technology and Economics – at D-MTEC at the Swiss Federal Institute of Technology in Zurich.

Hirayama focused on application-oriented research and is involved in several patents. She founded a start-up for coating technologies and moved to Zurich University of Applied Sciences Winterthur (ZHAW) as a lecturer, where she became director of the School of Engineering in 2011 and also took over the International Affairs department in 2014.

Martina Hirayama was president of the Institute Council of the Swiss Federal Institute of Metrology; Vice President of the board of directors of the Innosuisse funding agency and sat on the board of trustees of the Swiss National Science Foundation.

Martina Hirayama has been state secretary for education, research and innovation (SBFI) since 1 January 2019. In this role, she is the head of 280 employees and is responsible for an annual budget of CHF 4.5 billion.

Martina Hirayama has held dual German-Swiss citizenship since 2009.

In 2019, Martina Hirayama took part in the Bilderberg Conference.

Hirayama is a member of the Executive Advisory Board of the World.Minds Foundation, where she engages with global leaders on innovation, research, and education policy.
