= University of Lucerne =

Public University in Lucerne, Switzerland

- Universität Luzern
- Motto: Die persönliche Uni (German)
- Motto in English: The personal uni
- Type: Public
- Established: 2000; 26 years ago (as university); 1574; 452 years ago (as Jesuit College)
- Affiliations: Swissnex; Network of Swiss Research Councils Abroad
- Rector: Prof. Dr. Martin Hartmann
- Faculty: 246 (2018)
- Administrative staff: 291 (2018)
- Students: 3,037 (2019)
- Undergraduates: 1,468 (2019)
- Postgraduates: 894 (2019)
- Doctoral students: 365 (2019)
- Other students: 310 (2019)
- Location: Lucerne, Canton of Lucerne, Switzerland; 47°02′58″N 8°18′44″E
- Colours: Magenta
- Website: www.unilu.ch

The University of Lucerne (UNILU; German: Universität Luzern) is a public university with a campus in Lucerne, Switzerland. 1,460 undergraduates and 1,258 postgraduate students attend the university, which makes it Switzerland's smallest university.

Despite its size, it holds an international reputation in several areas. For instance, the Institute for Jewish-Christian Research has acquired renown despite its ban on hiring non-Catholic faculty. The university evolved over time: Since the early 17th century, courses in philosophy and theology have been taught in the city. The faculty of Theology was established in 1938, whereas the department of history was founded on 1 August 1989. In 1993, the faculty of humanities was established. After a popular vote, the University of Lucerne was established in 2000.

== History ==
In the aftermath of the Reformation, and due to the loss of Basel as a traditional seat of learning in Catholic Switzerland, the Jesuit College of Lucerne was founded in 1574 at the suggestion of Charles Borromeo, Archbishop of Milan. It was widely expected that this institution would one day grow to become a university, however, with the founding of the University of Fribourg in 1889, Lucerne's chances of hosting a university decreased significantly. This was the prevailing situation until the 1920s when, after a hiatus of almost 400 years, the opportunity to establish a Swiss Catholic university with faculties in Fribourg and Lucerne was pursued, but to no avail.

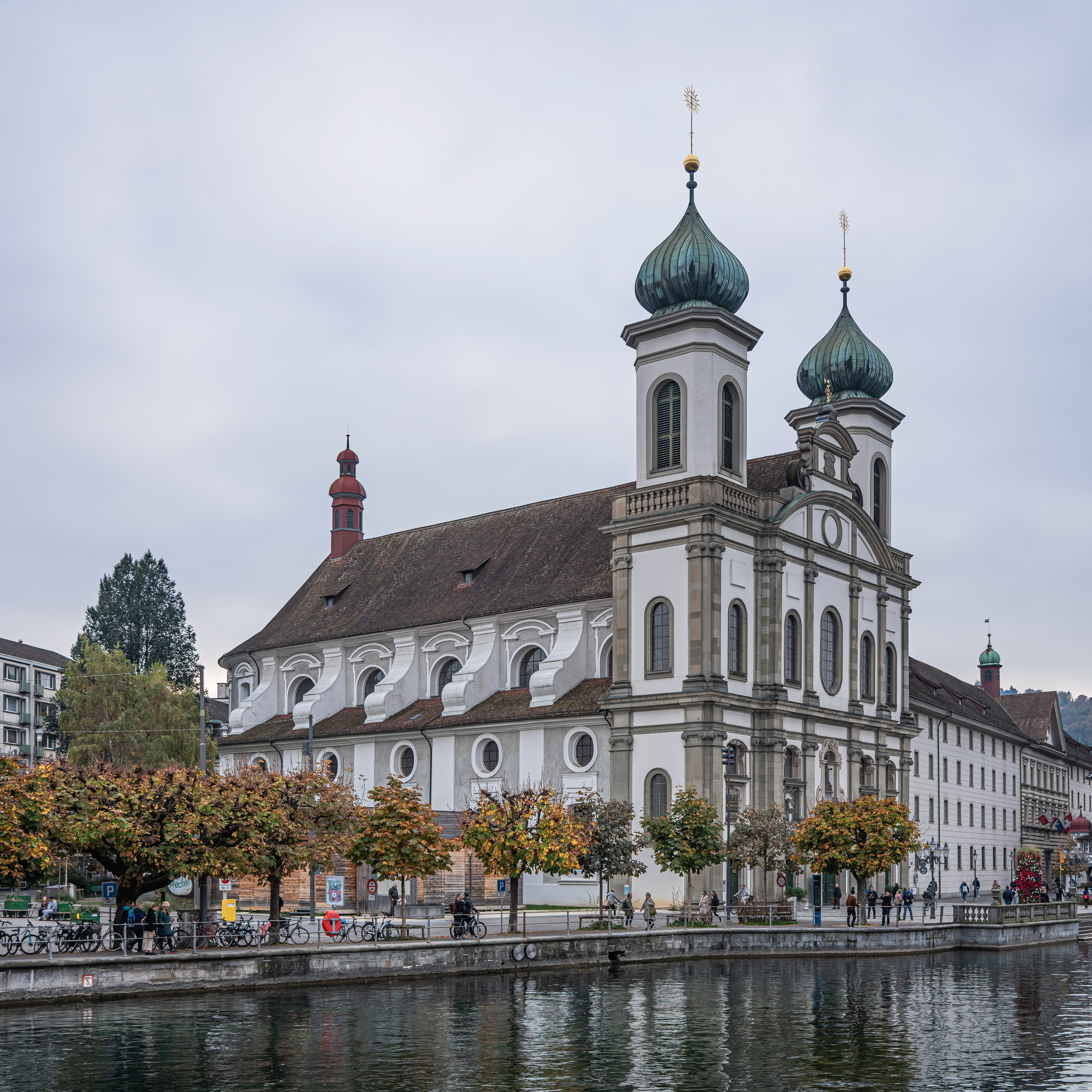
The university has a claim to continuity with Lucerne's Jesuit College

The first major project to establish a non-denominational university in Lucerne failed when, in 1978, a local referendum on the issue did not pass. Despite this setback, the city still benefited from the Swiss Federal Council's 1973 recognition of its Theological Institute as an accredited institution of higher education. By 1985 the theological institute was joined by a new 'Institute of Philosophy' and by a 'Department of History in 1989. These three institutions subsequently combined to form the Lucerne Faculty of Humanities in 1993. Finally, in the year 2000, a referendum on the establishment of a university was approved by the people of Lucerne. With the entry into force of the law on 1 October 2000, the former institution of higher education became a university. In 2001 a new faculty of was founded and in 2005 national recognition of the new university's status was achieved through a decree made by the Swiss Federal Council.

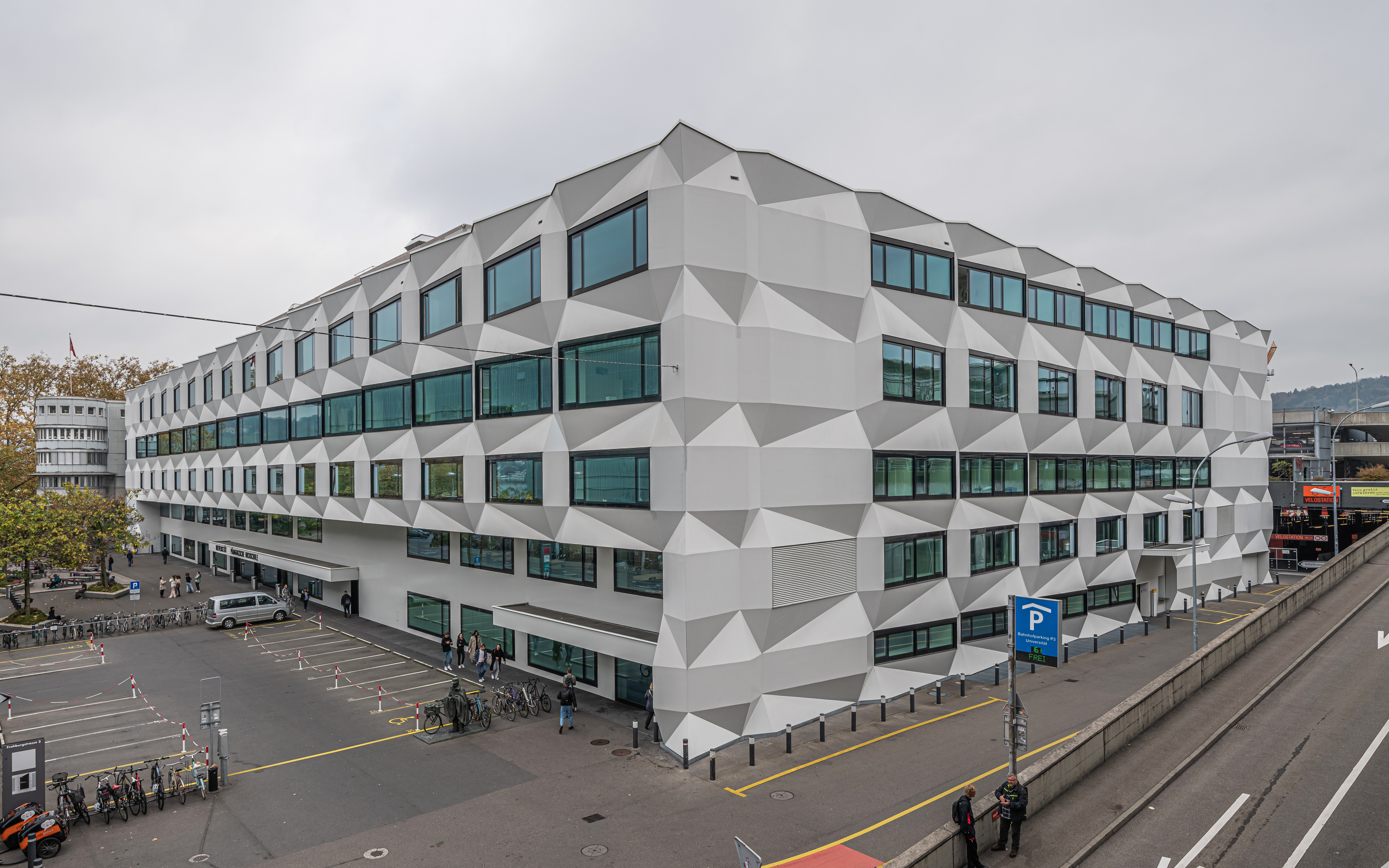
The main building of the university was opened in 2011 on the site of Lucerne's former postal sorting office

In the early years of its existence the university had no dedicated premises and operated from a range of buildings spread throughout the city of Lucerne. This change in the spring of 2006 when the voters of the city of Lucerne approved the purchase of a suitable university site and a contribution of eight million Swiss francs for the design and planning of a university campus. Shortly thereafter, in November 2006, a cantonal referendum approved the grant of a conversion loan of around 140 million Swiss francs for the construction of the planned university main building on the site of Lucerne's former main postal sorting office, which had recently been vacated. Building work on the new university building started in 2007 and was completed in 2011, allowing the university to move into its new premises, together with the University of Teacher Education of Central Switzerland, by September of that year. This consolidated both institutions various departments in one site for the first time in their respective histories.

Most recently, on 30 November 2014, the voters of the canton of Lucerne approved an amendment to the University Act in a referendum vote. The revised law made provision for the establishment of a faculty of economics, the financing and development of which should, for the first four years of operation, be ensured by third-party funding from companies, foundations and private individuals. The new faculty opened in 2016 with an initial intake of around 200 students.

== Faculties ==
The University of Lucerne has four faculties: Theology, Humanities and Social Sciences, Economy, Law.

=== Economics ===
- Centre for Human Resource Management

=== Humanities and Social Science ===
Departments of the faculty of Humanities and Social Science:

- Department of Ethnology
- Department of History
- Department of Economics
- Department of Philosophy
- Department of Sociology
- Department of Political Science
- Department for the Study of Religions
- Department of Health Sciences and Health Policy

=== Interdisciplinary Research Institutes and Research Centres ===
- Institute of Jewish-Christian Research (IJCF)
- Centre for Comparative Constitutional Law and Religion (CCCLR)
- Centre for Religion, Economy and Politics (ZRWP)
- Centre for Research on Religion

=== Law ===
Institutes and research centres of the faculty of Law:

- Centre for Conflict Resolution (CCR)
- Research Centre for International and European Private Law (FIP)
- Institute Lucernaiuris
- State Attorney Academy
- Centre for Law and Health (CLH)
- Centre for Law and Sustainability (CLS)
- Business Law Institute (IFU-BLI)
- Lucerne Centre for Social Security Law (LuZeSo)
- Centre for Logistics and Transport Law (KOLT)

=== Theology ===
Institutes and research units of the faculty of Theology:

- Department of Specialized Theological Studies for Students with pastoral experience (DBW)
- Ecumenical Institute (ÖI)
- Institute of Social Ethics (ISE)
- Institute of Religious Education (RPI)
- Institute of Advanced Training in Practical Theology (IFOK)

== Ranking ==
According to the 2005 swissUp ranking, the Lucerne School of Law is ranked amongst the top law schools in Switzerland.

Established in 2006 and therefore the youngest of its kind, the University of Lucerne’s Department of Political Science is already rated as one of the best in Switzerland for scientific publication output and international academic visibility.
