= Mittelschule =

Mittelschule (German pronunciation: [ˈmɪtl̩ˌʃuːlə]) is a German term literally translating to "Middle School" (i.e. a level "intermediate" between elementary and higher education). It is used in various senses in the education systems of the various parts of German-speaking Europe, not necessarily equivalent the English term middle school (which is itself used in various meanings in various parts of the English-speaking world).

Examples of such use include:

- Austria, lower secondary education for pupils aged 10–14, see education in Austria
- Germany
  - in some states of Germany, a school analogous to a Hauptschule
  - in other states of Germany, a combination of Hauptschule and Realschule
  - an education level positioned between Hauptschule and Gymnasium (i.e. the middle group of pupils in terms of academic ability in a system of parallel schools).
- Switzerland, see also education in Switzerland
  - a general German term for a Gymnasium, a secondary education, either for ages 15–18/19 (Sekundarstufe II, upper secondary education) also known as Kurzzeitmittelschule a.k.a. Kurzgymnasium, or then for ages from 12-18/19 (Sekundarstufe I & II, lower and upper secondary education) also known as Langzeitmittelschule a.k.a. Langgymnasium, both leading to university access with a Swiss Federal Matura graduation. There are, however, slight differences among cantons.
    Other terms used in Switzerland are:
    - German: Gymnasium, Kantonsschule (cantonal gymnasium managed by the canton; or short: Kanti, or KS), Kollegium, Lyceum, Maturitätsschule
    - French: Gymnase, Collège, Lycée, Gymnase/Lycée Cantonal (cantonal gymnasium managed by the canton), Lycée-Collège, Lycee-Colege, Écoles du secondaire II, École publique Supérieures
    - Italian: Liceo, Liceo Cantonale (cantonal gymnasium managed by the canton)
    - Romansh: Academia
  - Fachmittelschule (formerly Diplommittelschule), secondary education (Sekundarstufe II) with a Fachmatura graduation leading to access to Fachhochschule tertiary education, but not to university access.

== See also ==
- Education in Austria
- Education in Germany
- Education in Switzerland
- International Standard Classification of Education
- Secondary education
