= State Secretariat for Education, Research and Innovation =

- (in German) Staatssekretariat für Bildung, Forschung und Innovation (in French) Secrétariat d'État à la formation, à la recherche et à l'innovation (in Italian) Segreteria di Stato per la formazione, la ricerca e l’innovazione (in Romansh) Secretariat da stadi per furmaziun, retschertga ed innovaziun

Agency overview
- Headquarters: Bern
- Employees: 280
- Annual budget: CHF 4.5bn. ($5bn.)
- Minister responsible: State Secretary Martina Hirayama
- Parent department: Federal Department of Economic Affairs, Education and Research
- Child agency: Swiss Science Council
- Website: www.sbfi.admin.ch

The State Secretariat for Education, Research and Innovation (SERI) (Note: German: Staatssekretariat für Bildung, Forschung und Innovation, French: Secrétariat d'État à la formation, à la recherche et à l'innovation, Italian: Segreteria di Stato per la formazione, la ricerca e l’innovazione, Romansh: Secretariat da stadi per furmaziun, retschertga ed innovaziun) within the Federal Department of Economic Affairs, Education and Research is the Swiss federal government's specialised agency for national and international matters concerning education, research and innovation policy.

The SERI has 280 members of staff and controls an annual budget of around CHF 4.5 billion. The head of the SERI is State Secretary Martina Hirayama.

== Tasks ==
Numerous public and private stakeholders contribute to Switzerland’s federally structured system of education, research and innovation (ERI). They are responsible for performance, funding, legislation and strategic management. As the Confederation’s specialised agency for the ERI system, the SERI has the following remit:

- Establishing a strategic overview of the Swiss education, research and innovation system and preparing federal performance and resource plans.
- Pursuing international networking activities and ensuring that Switzerland remains involved in European and global education, research and innovation efforts.
- Fostering a broad and diverse range of education opportunities, ensuring that academic and vocational/professional pathways remain fully equivalent and compatible with one another.
- Maintaining and improving the quality and appeal of vocational/professional pathways in keeping with changes taking place in the labour market.
- Safeguarding the high quality of teaching and research at higher education institutions.
- Encouraging research and innovation, coordinating tasks and measures of federal research funding institutions.
- Encouraging and coordinating Swiss space research activities.

SERI pursues its remit in consultation with the cantons, professional organisations, higher education institutions and bodies as well as with other stakeholders involved in the promotion of research and innovation. SERI is responsible for relationships with national and international authorities and institutions. It also represents the Confederation at national and international forums. In addition, it is the national contact point for the recognition of foreign VET, PET and UAS qualifications, handling coordination between the various agencies involved. It is responsible for recognition of baccalaureates issued by cantonal baccalaureate schools. Finally, it works to ensure the comparability of VET and PET qualifications at both the national and international level.

The SERI is also responsible for the Swiss Science Council (SSC), which is administratively attached to it.

== Resources ==
SERI has an annual budget for education, research and innovation of around CHF 4.5 billion.

== EU Framework Programmes ==
The SERI represents Switzerland's interests in the EU Framework Programmes for Research and Innovation. It is supported in this task by three implementation partners: Euresearch, SwissCore and Swissuniversities. Euresearch receives funding from SERI to support Swiss-based researchers and innovators regarding participation in the EU Framework Programmes. SwissCore is Switzerland's Brussels-based liaison and information office for cooperation in ERI and is funded by the SERI, the Swiss National Science Foundation and Innosuisse. Swissuniversities coordinates the Swiss activities of EURAXESS, a European initiative that supports researcher mobility and career development, which are funded by SERI.

== History ==
SERI was formed from a merger of the State Secretariat for Education and Research (SER, formerly part of the Federal Department of Home Affairs) and the Federal Office for Professional Education and Technology (OPET, formerly part of the Federal Department of Economic Affairs) on 20 December 2012, and it began its activities on 1 January 2013. The entire range of federal activities in education, research and innovation now take place under the auspices of the broader-based Federal Department of Economic Affairs, Education and Research (EAER).

== Full-time positions since 2013 ==
Raw data

Source: "Federal Finance Administration FFA: Data portal".
