= Masescha =

- Weiler
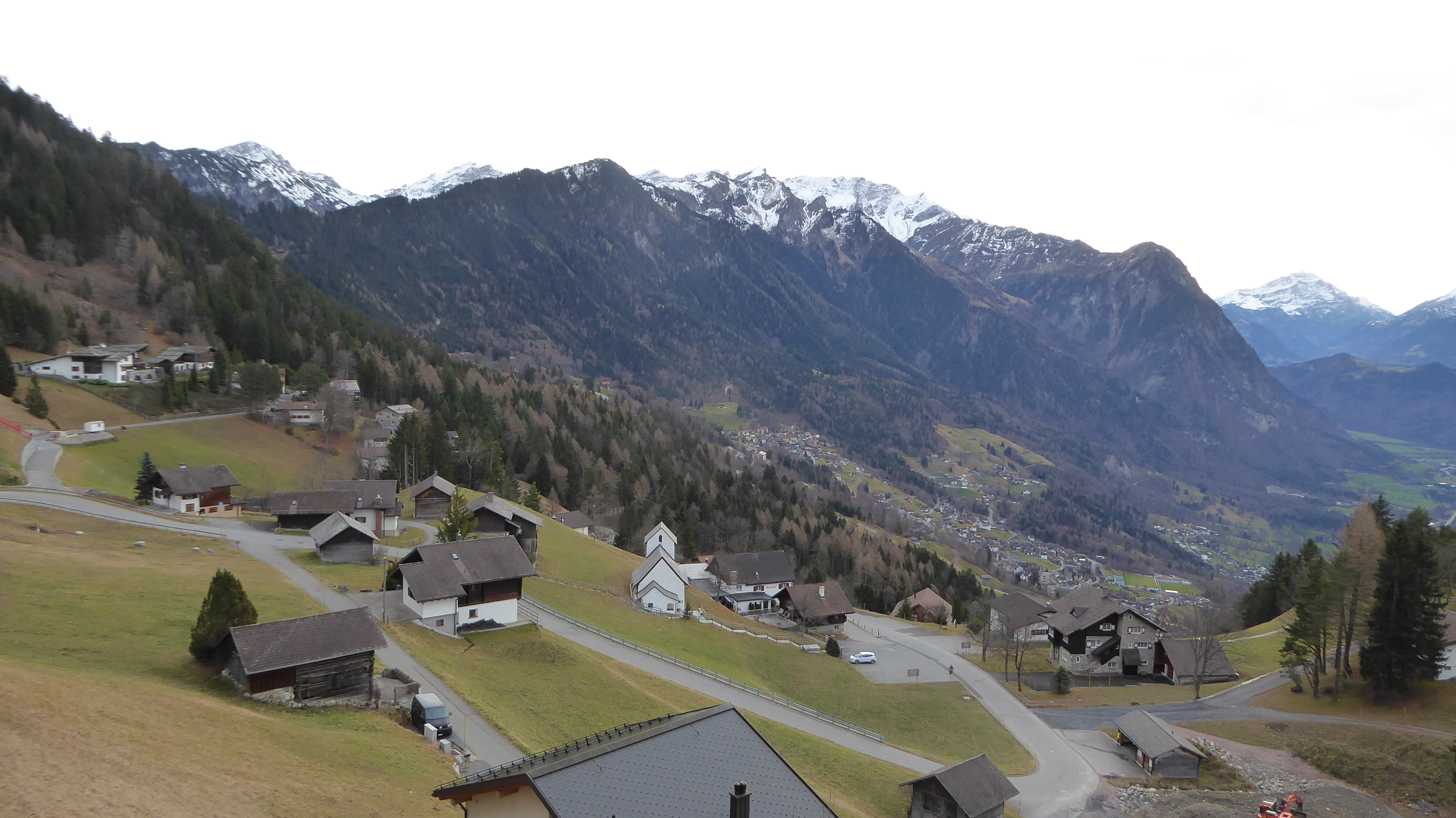
- View of Masescha, with the village of Triesenberg in the background, 2023

- Locator map of Masescha in Liechtenstein
- Coordinates: 47°07′58″N 9°32′40″E
- Country: Liechtenstein
- Electoral district: Oberland
- Municipality: Triesenberg
- Elevation: 1,250 m (4,100 ft)
- Time zone: UTC+1 (CET)
  - Summer (DST): UTC+2 (CEST)
- Postal code: 9497
- Area code: (+423) ...

Masescha is a Weiler (hamlet) of Liechtenstein, located in the municipality of Triesenberg. It is situated at approximately 1,230 metres above sea level on a glacial moraine plain.

== Geography and landscape ==
Masescha is situated on a moraine plain shaped by the Rhine Glacier. The landscape is characterised by rounded, gently sloping terrain forms with distinctive spatial enclosure created by surrounding forests and rock bands. The area forms part of a broader transitional zone between the main Triesenberg settlement and the higher alpine regions.

The hamlet contains what are believed to be some of Liechtenstein's highest-elevation orchards, with fruit trees cultivated at roughly 1,230 metres above sea level. These orchards, though diminished in recent decades, are a part of the cultural and ecological element of the settlement landscape.

== History ==
Masescha played a significant role in the early settlement of the Triesenberg area. Historical maps from 1721 show a chapel in Masescha, indicating its importance as a central location for the Walser settlements that were established in the region from the 13th century onwards. Over time, the settlement centre gradually shifted downhill from Masescha to what is now the main Triesenberg village centre (Jonaboden).

In 1890, tourism development began in Masescha with the construction of a mountain and spa house, part of the first wave of tourism infrastructure in the Triesenberg highlands alongside similar establishments in Sücka (1887) and Gaflei (1872).

== Present day ==
The modern settlement of Masescha is sparsely built but forms what land planning documents describe as an "amorphous settlement field" against the mountainside. The area maintains some of its traditional landscape features, with flowing transitions between open land and forest created by wooded pastures. From certain vantage points in Masescha, panoramic views stretch over the Rhine Valley below.

Local and regional planning authorities have identified Masescha and its surroundings as an area of landscape significance, with portions designated for landscape protection due to their cultural, historical, and natural values.
