= Sücka =

- Alp
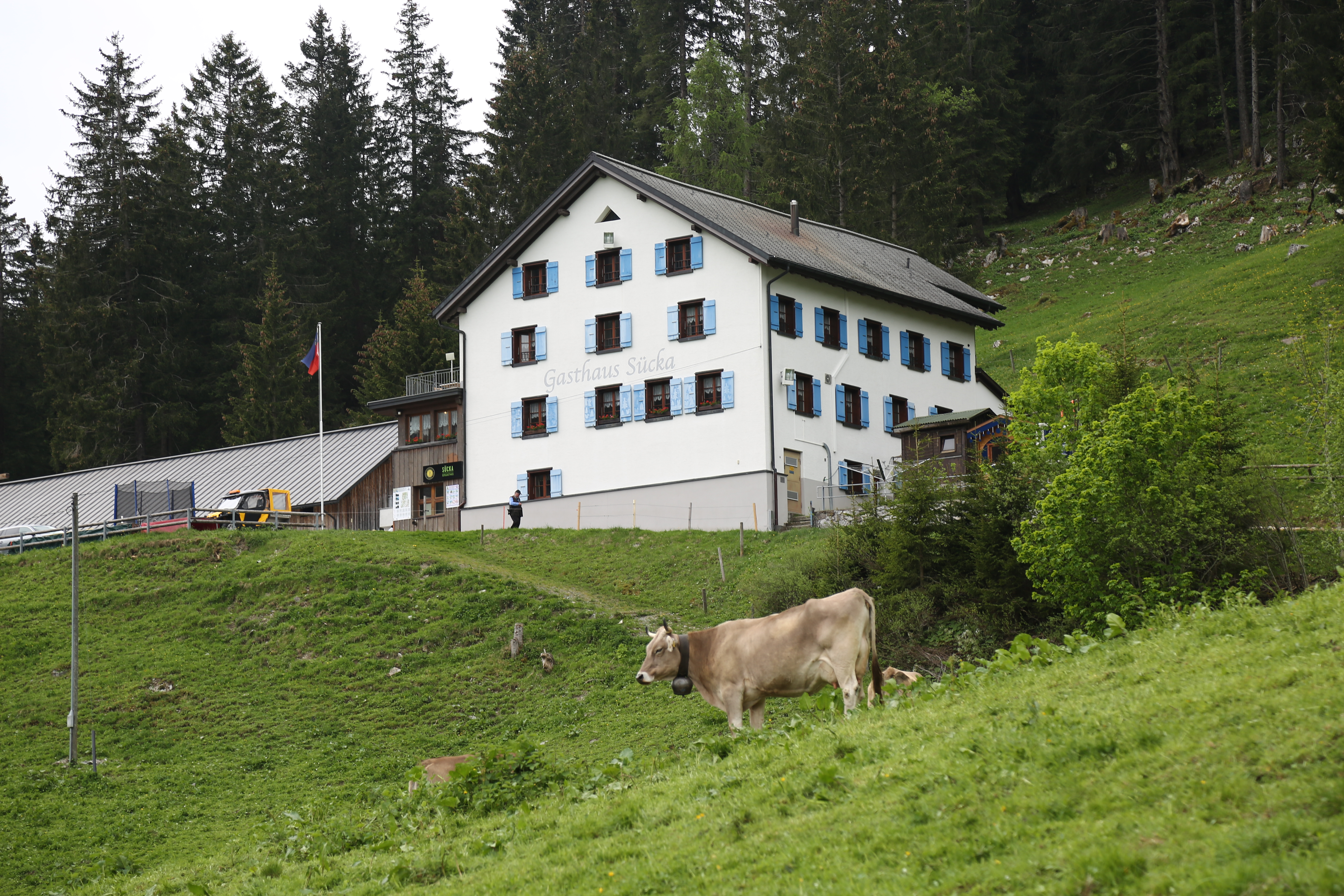
- Calves in front of Gasthaus Sücka, 2019

- Locator map of Sücka in Liechtenstein
- Coordinates: 47°07′N 9°34′E
- Country: Liechtenstein
- Electoral district: Oberland
- Municipality: Triesenberg
- Elevation: 1,100 m (3,600 ft)
- Time zone: UTC+1 (CET)
  - Summer (DST): UTC+2 (CEST)
- Postal code: 9497
- Area code: (+423) ...

Sücka (German pronunciation: [ˈzʏka]; dialectal: Sügga) is an Alp (alpine pasture) of Liechtenstein, located in the municipality of Triesenberg. Traditionally a cow pasture, it is situated in the Samina Valley and contains a mountain inn. Triesenberg purchased Sücka from Johann II, Prince of Liechtenstein in 1887.

== History ==
Sücka was first recorded in 1509 as the Triesener Alp. It came into private manorial ownership in the succeeding century. The Alp remained in private ownership until 1887, though public buildings such as a school and roads had started being constructed before the purchase by the municipality of Triesenberg. The area was developed as an alpine resort and location of a hiking trail. Within Sucka, they are known for making cheeses due to the cows that are traditionally left up there to freely graze during the summer.

By 2024, the main mountain inn was forced to be closed by the local authorities on the grounds that it had structural deficiencies and failed fire safety regulations. The Triesenberg Municipal Council deemed it was too expensive for them to fund renovating it. The council accordingly voted to investigate opportunities to collaborate with the private sector to ensure that Sücka could continue to operate as a working settlement. They ran an open day in April 2025 with the initial plan that it would be turned into an information centre to promote Sücka as a wilderness area.

== Geography ==
The place is located just to the west of Rotenboden on the road to Steg and Malbun. The river Samina flows close to it.
