= Silum =

Municipality in Liechtenstein

- Alp
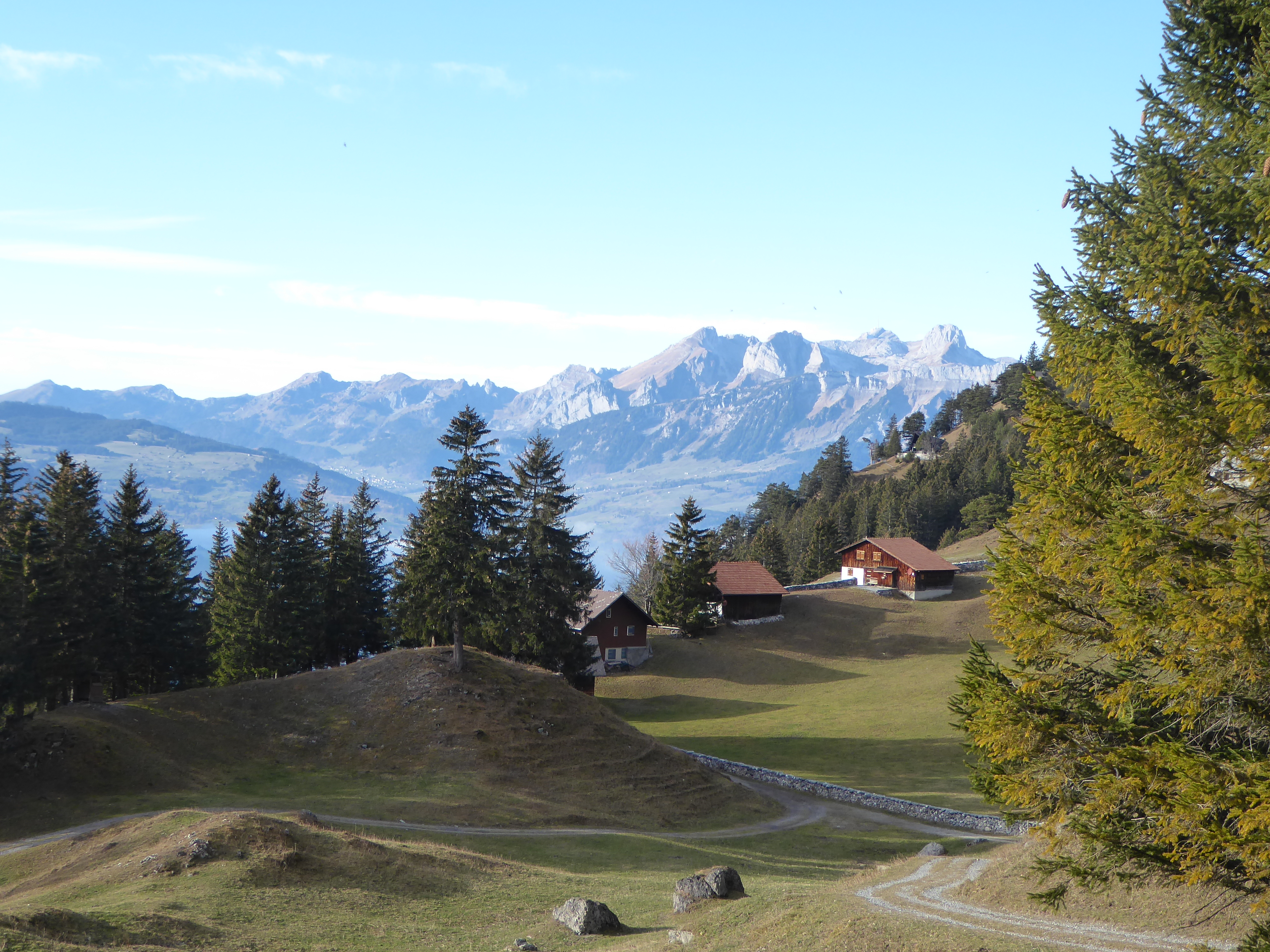
- Silum in 2018

- Locator map of Silum in Liechtenstein
- Coordinates: 47°08′N 9°33′E
- Country: Liechtenstein
- Electoral district: Oberland
- Municipality: Triesenberg
- Elevation: 1,430 m (4,690 ft)
- Time zone: UTC+1 (CET)
  - Summer (DST): UTC+2 (CEST)
- Postal code: 9497
- Area code: (+423) ...

Silum is an Alp (alpine pasture) of Liechtenstein, located in the municipality of Triesenberg. It is located on a distinctive slumping mass composed of scree slopes, positioned beneath the breakaway ridge of one of the Alps' largest landslides, which occurred approximately 12,000 years ago following the retreat of the Rhine Glacier. The area exemplifies traditional Walser agricultural patterns, featuring patchworks of meadows that reveal historic property boundaries when differently mowed during summer. Ecologically significant, Silum contains wetland areas, dry meadows supporting rare plant and insect species, and wooded pastures that create semi-open pastoral landscapes.

== Geography and landscape ==
Silum is located on a slumping mass consisting of scree slopes, positioned beneath the breakaway ridge of one of the Alps' largest landslides, which occurred about 12,000 years ago following the retreat of the Rhine Glacier. The upper part of Silum features rocky areas, while its lowest point is marked by rocky outcrops. This geomorphological setting creates a distinctive landscape character with varied terrain and vegetation patterns. The area contains notable ecological features, including a unique wetland meadow in an area known as "Ebni" which has been designated for protection due to its rarity in the Triesenberg region. The sloping meadows around Silum are characterised by their floristic diversity, with many classified as valuable dry meadows that support rare plant and insect species.

Silum exemplifies the traditional Walser agricultural patterns of Triesenberg. The individual use pattern of high meadows is still visible in Silum, with the patchwork of differently mowed meadows during summer revealing the historic property boundaries. The few remaining traditional huts in the area are remnants of this agricultural system, where farmers maintained dwellings at various elevations to manage livestock and hay production throughout the seasons.

The transitions between open land and forest in Silum remain fluid due to the presence of wooded pastures, particularly at steeper slopes. From a distance, the density of trees in these areas creates the impression of forest, though they are actually semi-open pastoral landscapes—an increasingly rare feature in the region.

Silum includes several old, ecologically valuable trees, including aged maple trees near agricultural buildings. The area around Kurhaus Silum (a tourist facility constructed during World War I) has been identified as a landscape feature that should remain free from further development to preserve the area's character. The landscape of Silum, along with other highland areas of Triesenberg including Bargälla, Färcha, Trischel, and Vorder- and Hinterprufatscheng, has been proposed for designation as a landscape protection area due to its cultural, historical, and ecological significance.

== Gallery ==
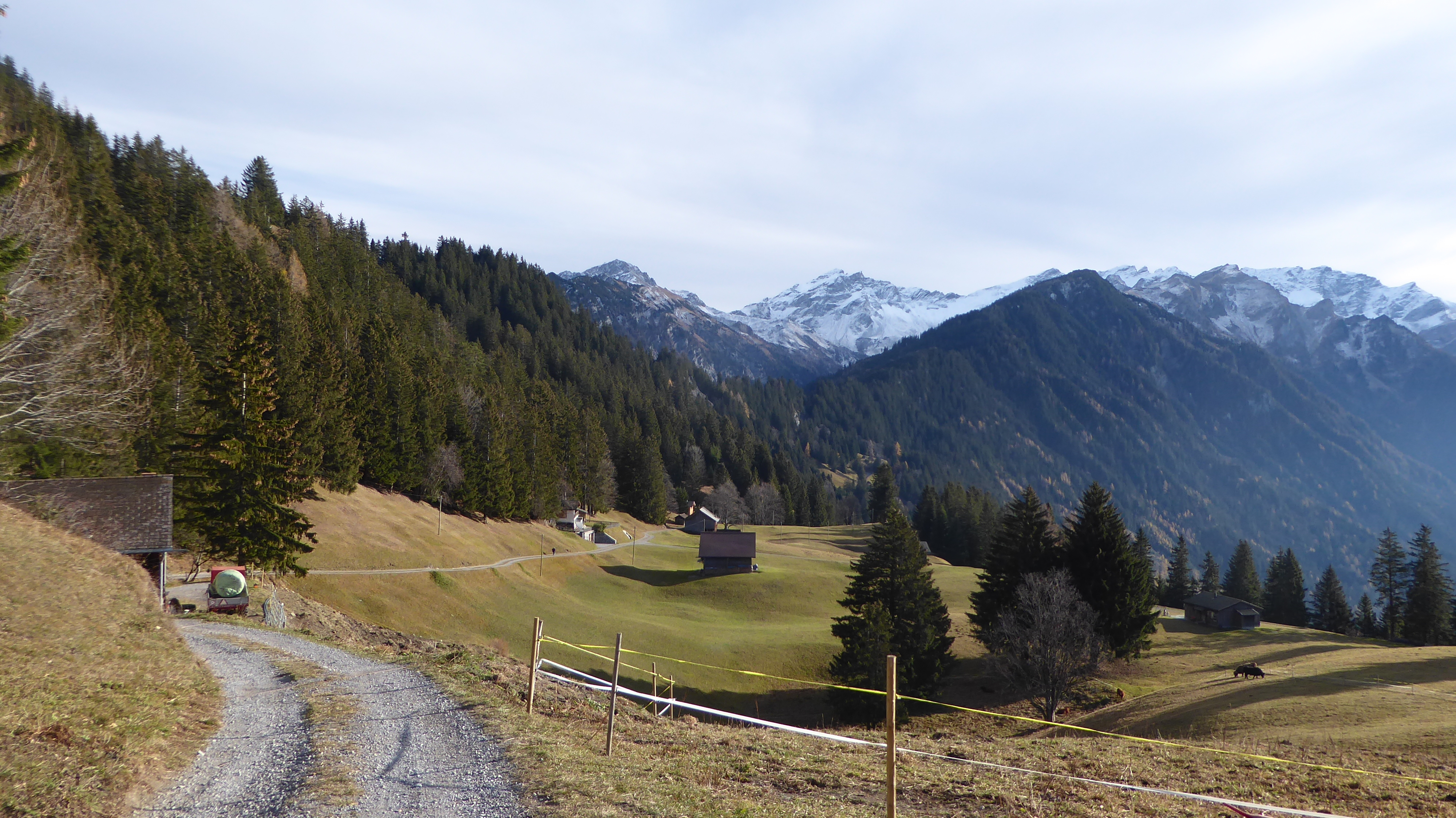
Vordersilum

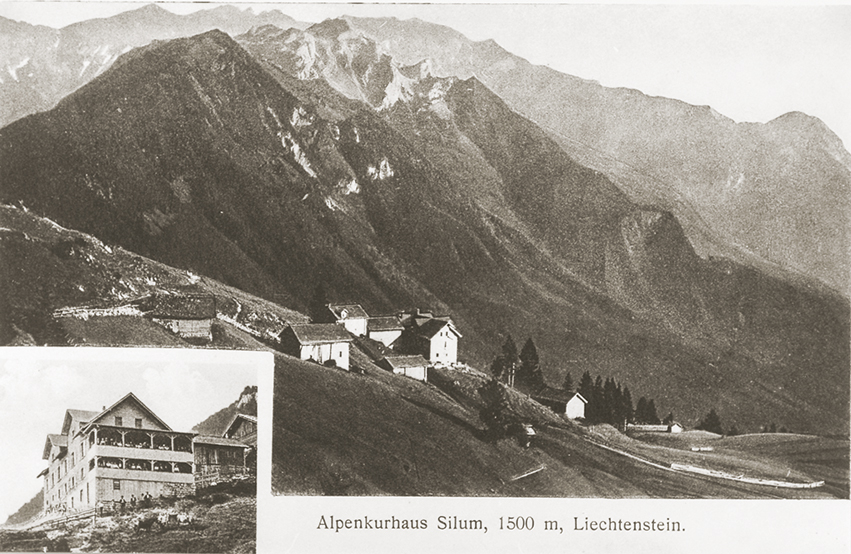
Historical postcard of the Alpine spa

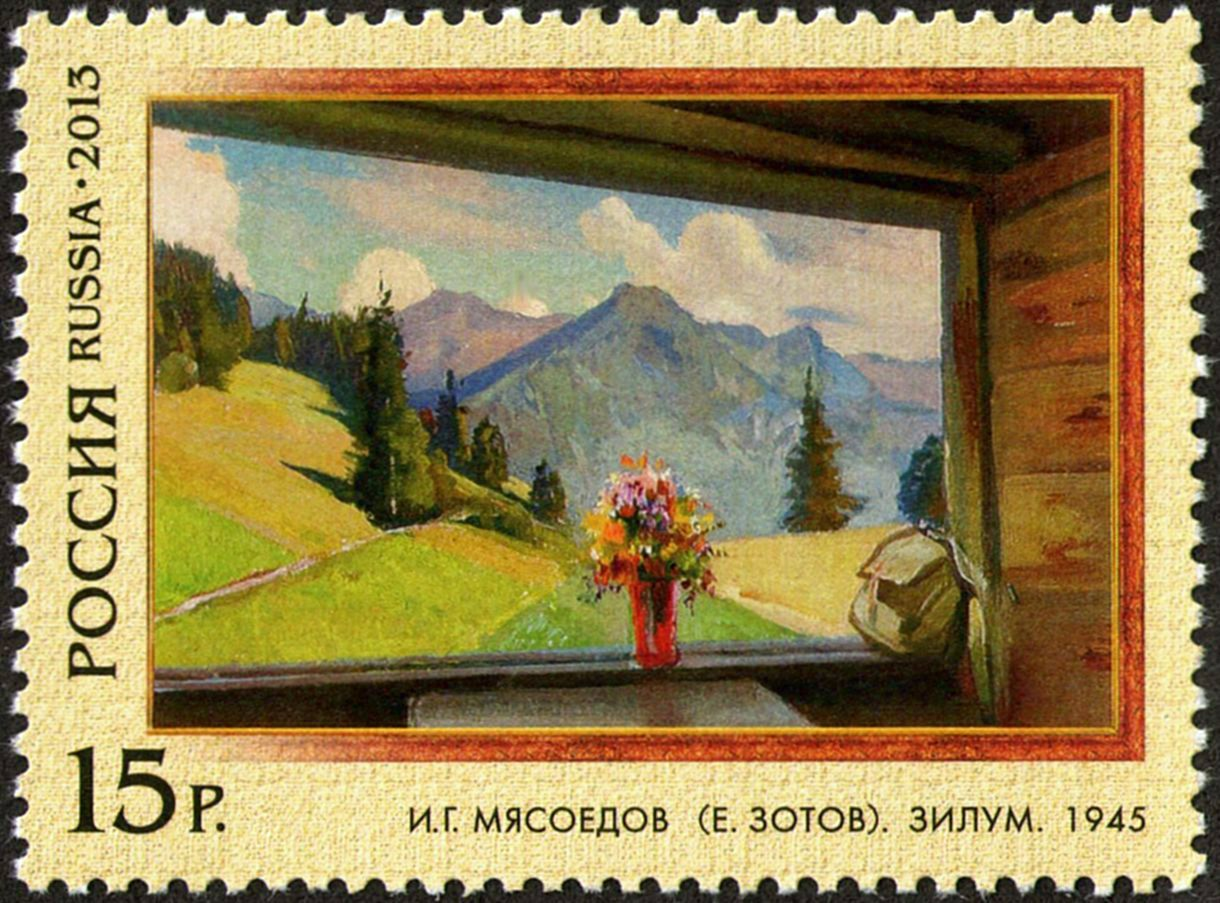
A Russian stamp depicting Silum
