= Malbun =

- Village
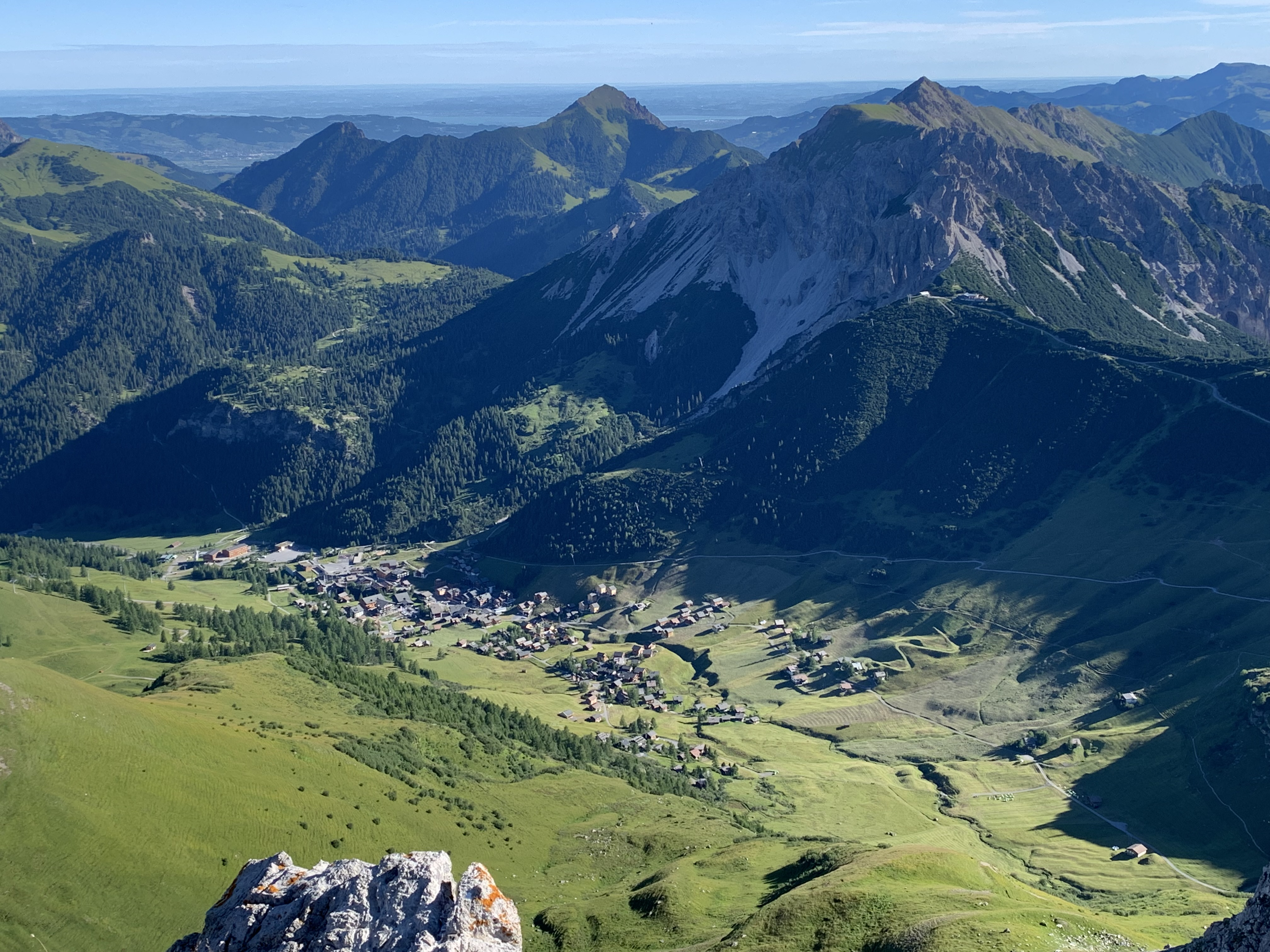
- Malbun in 2022

- Locator map of Malbun in Liechtenstein
- Coordinates: 47°6′7.2″N 9°36′28.8″E
- Country: Liechtenstein
- Electoral district: Oberland
- Municipality: Triesenberg
- Elevation: 1,600 m (5,200 ft)
- Time zone: UTC+1 (CET)
  - Summer (DST): UTC+2 (CEST)
- Postal code: 9497
- Area code: (+423) ...
- Website: Official website

Malbun (German pronunciation: [malˈbuːn]) is a ski resort village in an exclave of the municipality of Triesenberg, in Liechtenstein.

== Geography ==
Malbun is the only resort for skiing in Liechtenstein. It is located at 1,600 metres (5,249 feet) above sea level in the Alps, on a road to Steg and Vaduz, and less than two kilometers from the Austrian border. In 1968, five Swiss artillery shells accidentally hit it, damaging a few chairs that were sitting outdoors.

== Bergbahnen Malbun ==
Bergbahnen Malbun is the actual ski area of Malbun village and is serviced by three chair lifts: two on the western slope area and one on the eastern slope area. At the top of Bergbahn Malbun's eastern lift, the alpine ridges of Switzerland and Austria can be seen. At the slope area's base are two children's areas. Malbi Park is the learning area for children that is provided at no cost and includes a miniature tow-bar as well as a magic carpet. The other area is primarily the location of Malbun's ski school instruction and is located a short distance further from the main ski area.
