= Mäls =

- Village
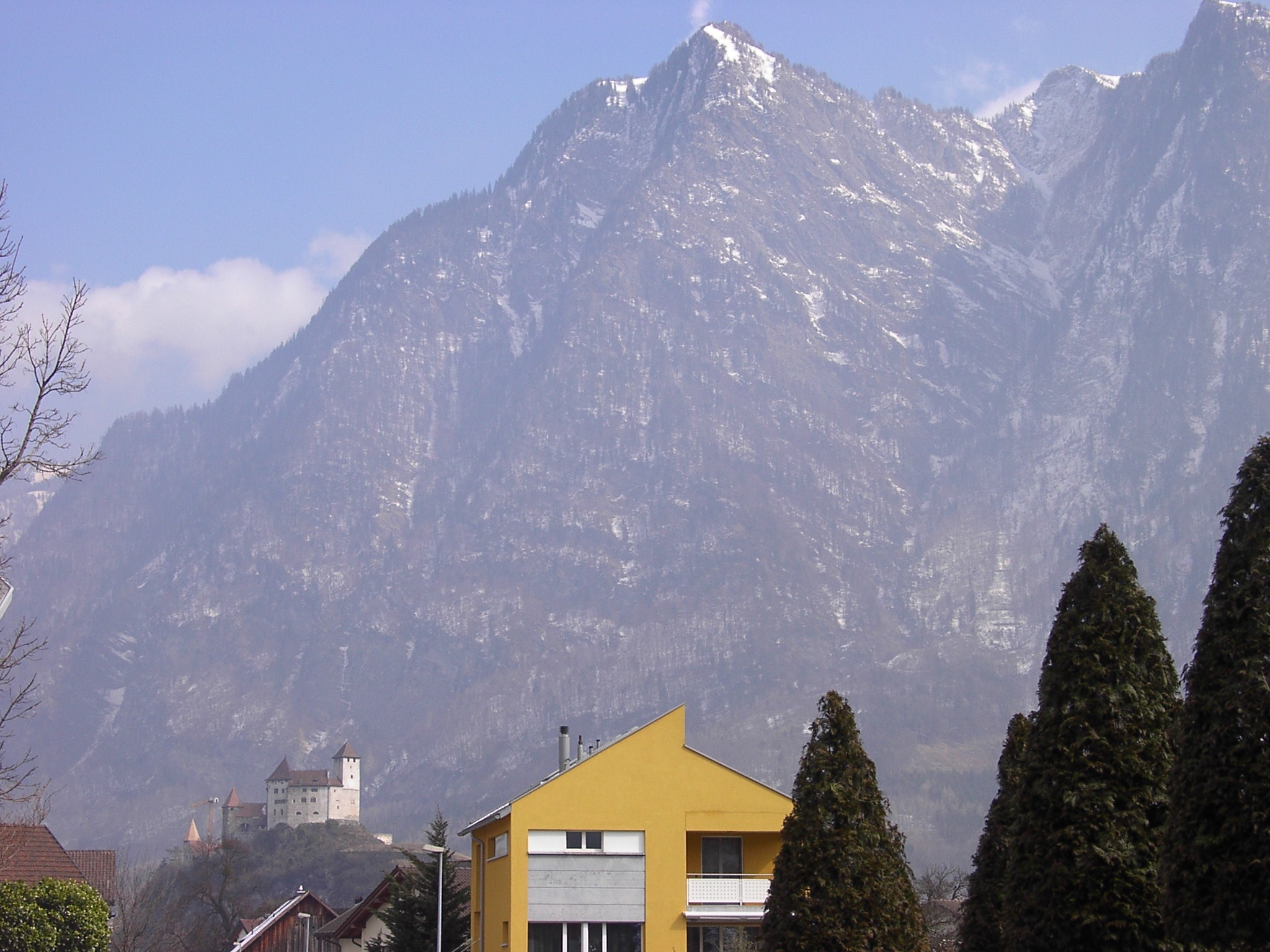

- Locator map of Mäls in Liechtenstein
- Coordinates: 47°03′45″N 9°29′40″E
- Country: Liechtenstein
- Electoral district: Oberland
- Municipality: Balzers
- Elevation: 472 m (1,549 ft)
- Time zone: UTC+1 (CET)
  - Summer (DST): UTC+2 (CEST)
- Postal code: 9496
- Area code: (+423) ...

Mäls is a former Weiler (hamlet) of Liechtenstein, located in the municipality of Balzers.

== Geography ==
The former hamlet, contiguous with Balzers, is located next to the river Rhine and to the borders of Switzerland. Gutenberg Castle is situated on a rocky hill between Balzers and Mäls.
