= Oberland (electoral district) =

Oberland Wahlkreis Oberland
- Electoral district of Liechtenstein
- Coordinates: 47°8′27.6″N 9°31′15.6″E
- Country: Liechtenstein
- Seat: Vaduz
- Municipalities: 6 (Balzers, Planken, Schaan, Triesen, Triesenberg, Vaduz)

Area
  - Total: 125.5 km^{2} (48.5 sq mi)

Population (2019)
  - Total: 24,763
- Time zone: UTC+1 (CET)
  - Summer (DST): UTC+2 (CEST)
- Area code: (+423)

Oberland (German: Wahlkreis Oberland), meaning "upper land", is one of the two electoral districts of Liechtenstein. It corresponds to the historic County of Vaduz (German: Grafschaft Vaduz), and the administrative seat is the city of Vaduz, the national capital. It has 15 seats in the Landtag.

== Geography ==
The district, which includes the main towns of Vaduz and Schaan, is more populous than the Unterland and spans the southern portion, with between four-fifths and five-sixths of the country's land area. It is composed of six municipalities and 11 villages, for a total of 17 settlements.

Municipality	Pop. (2014)	Area (km^{2})	Hamlets
Balzers	4,587	19.7	Mäls
Planken	424	5.3	none
Schaan	5,963	26.9	none
Triesen	5,009	26.5	Lawena, Valüna
Triesenberg	2,604	29.7	Gaflei, Malbun, Masescha, Rotenboden, Silum, Steg, Sücka, Wangerberg
Vaduz	5,425	17.3	Ebenholz, Mühleholz

== Members ==
=== Indirect election: 1878–1918 ===
When the district was established, its representatives were elected by a delegation of 100 electors, who themselves were elected by the citizens of the district.

Election	Member (party)	Member (party)	Member (party)	Member (party)	Member (party)	Member (party)	Member (party)
1878	Josef Anton Amann	Wendelin Erni	Peter Rheinberger	Johann Alois Schlegel	Wilhelm Schlegel	Johann Georg Vogt	Christoph Wanger
1882	Josef Anton Amann	Wendelin Erni	Franz Xaver Bargetze	Christian Brunhart	Albert Schädler	Josef Schlegel	Franz Josef Beck
1886	Christoph Wanger	Wendelin Erni	Franz Xaver Bargetze	Christian Brunhart	Albert Schädler	Peter Rheinberger	Franz Josef Beck
1890	Meinrad Ospelt	Josef Isidor Brunhart	Franz Xaver Bargetze	Johann Baptist Büchel	Albert Schädler	Peter Rheinberger	Franz Josef Beck
1894	Ferdinand Walser	Christian Brunhart	Franz Xaver Bargetze	Johann Baptist Büchel	Albert Schädler	Karl Schädler	Franz Josef Beck
1898	Ferdinand Walser	Heinrich Brunhart	Franz Xaver Bargetze	Johann Baptist Büchel	Albert Schädler	Karl Schädler	Franz Josef Beck
1902	Franz Schegel	Heinrich Brunhart	Jakob Falk	Johann Baptist Büchel	Albert Schädler	Karl Schädler	Franz Josef Beck
1906	Franz Schegel	Heinrich Brunhart	Xaver Bargetze	Fritz Walser	Albert Schädler	Karl Schädler	Franz Josef Beck
1910	Franz Schegel	Emil Wolfinger	Xaver Bargetze	Fritz Walser	Albert Schädler	Alfons Brunhart	Franz Josef Beck
1914	Wilhelm Beck	Egon Rheinberger	Josef Brunhart	Albert Wolfinger	Albert Schädler	Josef Sprenger	Franz Josef Beck

=== Direct election: 1918–1932 ===
==== Seven seats: 1918–1922 ====
Election	Member (party)	Member (party)	Member (party)	Member (party)	Member (party)	Member (party)	Member (party)
1918	Johann Wanger (FBP)	Fritz Walser (FBP)	Wilhelm Beck (CSV)	Josef Gassner (CSV)	Emil Risch (CSV)	Josef Sprenger (CSV)	Albert Wolfinger (CSV)

==== Nine seats: 1922–1932 ====
Election	Member (party)	Member (party)	Member (party)	Member (party)	Member (party)	Member (party)	Member (party)	Member (party)	Member (party)
1922	Emil Bargetze (CSV)	Alois Frick (CSV)	Augustin Marogg (CSV)	Stefan Wachter (CSV)	Anton Walser (CSV)	Wilhelm Beck (CSV)	Baptist Quaderer (CSV)	Albert Wolfinger (CSV)	Josef Gassner (CSV)
Jan 1926	Emil Bargetze (CSV)	Alois Frick (CSV)	Johann Jakob Feger (CSV)	Alois Jehle (CSV)	Andreas Vogt (CSV)	Wilhelm Beck (CSV)	Baptist Quaderer (CSV)	Anton Walser-Kirchthaler (CSV)	Josef Gassner (CSV)
Apr 1926	Emil Bargetze (CSV)	Josef Steger (CSV)	Johann Jakob Feger (CSV)	Alois Jehle (CSV)	Andreas Vogt (CSV)	Wilhelm Beck (CSV)	Baptist Quaderer (CSV)	Anton Walser-Kirchthaler (CSV)	Josef Gassner (CSV)
Apr 1928	Heinrich Brunhart (FBP)	Anton Frommelt (FBP)	Ferdinand Risch (FBP)	Georg Vogt (FBP)	Oswald Walser (FBP)	Franz Amann (CSV)	Gustav Ospelt Sr. (CSV)	Basil Vogt (CSV)	Josef Gassner (CSV)
1930	Heinrich Brunhart (FBP)	Anton Frommelt (FBP)	Ferdinand Risch (FBP)	Georg Vogt (FBP)	Oswald Walser (FBP)	Josef Ospelt (FBP)	Bernhard Risch (FBP)	Johann Schädler (FBP)	Fritz Walser (FBP)

=== 1932–1939 ===
In the 1930s, the electoral districts were abolished, and the Landtag was composed of a mixture of representatives of municipalities and members elected from a national list.

=== 1939–present: proportional representation ===
In 1939, the coalition government introduced proportional representation, bringing back the districts of Oberland and Unterland.

==== Nine seats: 1939–1989 ====
Election	Member (party)	Member (party)	Member (party)	Member (party)	Member (party)	Member (party)	Member (party)	Member (party)	Member (party)
1939	Louis Brunhart (FBP)	Franz Eberle (FBP)	Anton Frommelt (FBP)	Ferdinand Risch (FBP)	Basil Vogt (VU)	Otto Schaedler (VU)	Josef Sele (VU)	Florian Kindle (VU)	Johann Beck (VU)
1945	David Strub (FBP)	Johann Beck (FBP)	Fidel Brunhart (FBP)	Josef Negele (FBP)	Alois Ritter (VU)	Heinrich Andreas Brunhart (VU)	Josef Sele (VU)	Florian Kindle (VU)	Johann Wachter (VU)
1949	David Strub (FBP)	Tobias Jele (FBP)	Fidel Brunhart (FBP)	Engelbert Schädler (FBP)	Alois Ritter (VU)	Heinrich Andreas Brunhart (VU)	Wendelin Beck (VU)	Alois Vogt (VU)	Johann Wachter (VU)
Feb 1953	David Strub (FBP)	Martin Risch (FBP)	Fidel Brunhart (FBP)	Ernst Risch (FBP)	Alois Ritter (VU)	Ivo Beck (VU)	Wendelin Beck (VU)	Josef Büchel (VU)	Alois Ospelt Jr. (VU)
Jun 1953	David Strub (FBP)	Martin Risch (FBP)	Fidel Brunhart (FBP)	Ernst Risch (FBP)	Alois Ritter (VU)	Ivo Beck (VU)	Andreas Vogt (VU)	Alois Vogt (VU)	Johann Beck (VU)
1957	Josef Hoop (FBP)	Martin Risch (FBP)	Hans Gassner (FBP)	Stefan Wachter Jr. (FBP)	Alois Ritter (VU)	Ludwig Beck (VU)	Andreas Vogt (VU)	Josef Büchel (VU)	Johann Beck (VU)
1958	Josef Hoop (FBP)	Martin Risch (FBP)	Meinrad Ospelt (FBP)	Stefan Wachter Jr. (FBP)	Fidel Brunhart (FBP)	Roman Gassner (VU)	Andreas Vogt (VU)	Alois Vogt (VU)	Johann Beck (VU)
1962	Hans Gassner (FBP)	Martin Risch (FBP)	Meinrad Ospelt (FBP)	Stefan Wachter Jr. (FBP)	Franz Josef Schurte (FBP)	Roman Gassner (VU)	Otto Schaedler (VU)	Alois Vogt (VU)	Johann Beck (VU)
1966	Alexander Frick (FBP)	Peter Marxer (FBP)	Gustav Ospelt (FBP)	Josef Büchel (FBP)	Karlheinz Ritter (VU)	Roman Gassner (VU)	Ivo Beck (VU)	Samuel Kindle (VU)	Johann Beck (VU)
1970	Alexander Frick (FBP)	Peter Marxer (FBP)	Emanuel Vogt (FBP)	Hans Verling (FBP)	Karlheinz Ritter (VU)	Roman Gassner (VU)	Herbert Kindle (VU)	Franz Beck (VU)	Johann Beck (VU)
1974	Hilmar Ospelt (FBP)	Peter Marxer (FBP)	Emanuel Vogt (FBP)	Noldi Frommelt (FBP)	Karlheinz Ritter (VU)	Josef Frommelt (FBP)	Herbert Kindle (VU)	Franz Beck (VU)	Johann Beck (VU)
1978	Hilmar Ospelt (FBP)	Peter Marxer (FBP)	Josef Biedermann (FBP)	Noldi Frommelt (FBP)	Karlheinz Ritter (VU)	Alfons Schädler (VU)	Wolfgang Feger (VU)	Franz Beck (VU)	Georg Gstöhl (VU)
1982	Louis Gassner (FBP)	Dieter Walch (FBP)	Josef Biedermann (FBP)	Noldi Frommelt (FBP)	Karlheinz Ritter (VU)	Alfons Schädler (VU)	Paul Kindle (VU)	Ludwig Seger (VU)	Georg Gstöhl (VU)
1986	Louis Gassner (FBP)	Dieter Walch (FBP)	Josef Biedermann (FBP)	Johann Kindle (FBP)	Karlheinz Ritter (VU)	Alfons Schädler (VU)	Paul Kindle (VU)	Helmuth Matt (VU)	Georg Vogt (VU)

==== 15 seats: 1989–present ====
Election	Member (party)	Member (party)	Member (party)	Member (party)	Member (party)	Member (party)	Member (party)	Member (party)	Member (party)	Member (party)	Member (party)	Member (party)	Member (party)	Member (party)	Member (party)
1989	Ernst Walch (FBP)	Dieter Walch (FBP)	Alois Ospelt (FBP)	Johann Kindle (FBP)	Georg Schierscher (FBP)	Martin Jehle (FBP)	Josef Biedermann (FBP)	Helmuth Matt (VU)	Paul Kindle (VU)	Alfons Schädler (VU)	Walter Schädler (VU)	Reinhard Walser (VU)	Georg Vogt (VU)	Karlheinz Ritter (VU)	Patrick Hilty (VU)
Feb 1993	Ernst Walch (FBP)	Dieter Walch (FBP)	Xaver Hoch (FBP)	Thomas Büchel (FBP)	Alois Beck (FBP)	Werner Ospelt (FBP)	Guido Meier (FBP)	Paul Vogt (FL)	Paul Kindle (VU)	Peter Wolff (VU)	Walter Hartmann (VU)	Norbert Bürzle (VU)	Karlheinz Ospelt (VU)	Lorenz Heeb (VU)	Volker Rheinberger (VU)
Oct 1993	Gebhard Hoch (FBP)	Klaus Wagner (FBP)	Xaver Hoch (FBP)	Thomas Büchel (FBP)	Alois Beck (FBP)	Werner Ospelt (FBP)	Hubert Sele (VU)	Paul Vogt (FL)	Paul Kindle (VU)	Peter Wolff (VU)	Walter Hartmann (VU)	Norbert Bürzle (VU)	Karlheinz Ospelt (VU)	Lorenz Heeb (VU)	Volker Rheinberger (VU)
1997	Gebhard Hoch (FBP)	Klaus Wagner (FBP)	Marco Ospelt (FBP)	Elmar Kindle (FBP)	Alois Beck (FBP)	Helmut Konrad (FBP)	Hubert Sele (VU)	Paul Vogt (FL)	Peter Sprenger (VU)	Peter Wolff (VU)	Walter Hartmann (VU)	Norbert Bürzle (VU)	Karlheinz Ospelt (VU)	Lorenz Heeb (VU)	Volker Rheinberger (VU)
2001	Peter Lampert (FBP)	Klaus Wagner (FBP)	Wendelin Lampert (FBP)	Elmar Kindle (FBP)	Alois Beck (FBP)	Helmut Konrad (FBP)	Adrian Hasler (FBP)	Paul Vogt (FL)	Peter Sprenger (VU)	Peter Wolff (VU)	Walter Hartmann (VU)	Erich Sprenger (VU)	Hugo Quaderer (VU)	Dorothee Laternser (VU)	Walter Vogt (VU)
2005	Peter Lampert (FBP)	Klaus Wagner (FBP)	Wendelin Lampert (FBP)	Elmar Kindle (FBP)	Alois Beck (FBP)	Doris Frommelt (FBP)	Josy Biedermann (FBP)	Paul Vogt (FL)	Harry Quaderer (VU/DU)	Pepo Frick (FL)	Arthur Brunhart (VU)	Gebhard Negele (VU)	Hugo Quaderer (VU)	Heinz Vogt (VU)	Jürgen Beck (VU)
2009	Peter Lampert (FBP)	Albert Frick (FBP)	Wendelin Lampert (FBP)	Elmar Kindle (FBP)	Doris Frommelt (FBP)	Christian Batliner (FBP)	Diana Hilti (VU)	Peter Hilti (VU)	Harry Quaderer (VU/DU)	Pepo Frick (FL)	Arthur Brunhart (VU)	Gebhard Negele (VU)	Gisela Biedermann (VU)	Tomas Vogt (VU)	Jürgen Beck (VU)
2013	Eugen Nägele (FBP)	Albert Frick (FBP)	Wendelin Lampert (FBP)	Alois Beck (FBP)	Christine Wohlwend (FBP)	Christian Batliner (FBP)	Pio Schurti (DU)	Helen Konzett Bargetze (FL)	Harry Quaderer (VU/DU)	Thomas Lageder (FL)	Frank Konrad (VU)	Christoph Wenaweser (VU)	Christoph Beck (VU)	Tomas Vogt (VU)	Karin Rüdisser-Quaderer (VU)
2017	Eugen Nägele (FBP)	Albert Frick (FBP)	Wendelin Lampert (FBP)	Daniel Seger (FBP)	Susanne Eberle-Strub (FBP)	Thomas Rehak (DU)	Jürgen Beck (DU)	Georg Kaufmann (FL)	Harry Quaderer (VU/DU)	Thomas Lageder (FL)	Frank Konrad (VU)	Christoph Wenaweser (VU)	Manfred Kaufmann (VU)	Tomas Vogt (VU)	Günter Vogt (VU)
2021	Sebastian Gassner (FBP)	Albert Frick (FBP)	Wendelin Lampert (FBP)	Daniel Seger (FBP)	Sascha Quaderer (FBP)	Bettina Petzold-Mähr (FBP)	Thomas Rehak (DpL)	Georg Kaufmann (FL)	Norma Heidegger (VU)	Manuela Haldner-Schierscher (FL)	Dagmar Bühler-Nigsch (VU)	Walter Frick (VU)	Manfred Kaufmann (VU)	Tomas Vogt (VU)	Günter Vogt (VU)
2025	Sebastian Gassner (FBP)	Daniel Salzgeber (FBP)	Bettina Petzold-Mähr (FBP)	Daniel Seger (FBP)	Marion Kindle-Kühnis (DpL)	Joachim Vogt (DpL)	Thomas Rehak (DpL)	Martin Seger (DpL)	Christoph Wenaweser (VU)	Manuela Haldner-Schierscher (FL)	Dagmar Bühler-Nigsch (VU)	Roger Schädler (VU)	Manfred Kaufmann (VU)	Tomas Vogt (VU)	Carmen Heeb-Kindle (VU)

== See also ==
- Unterland (electoral district)
- Landtag of Liechtenstein
- NUTS statistical regions of Liechtenstein
- Lists of electoral districts by nation
