= Wangerberg =

- Weiler
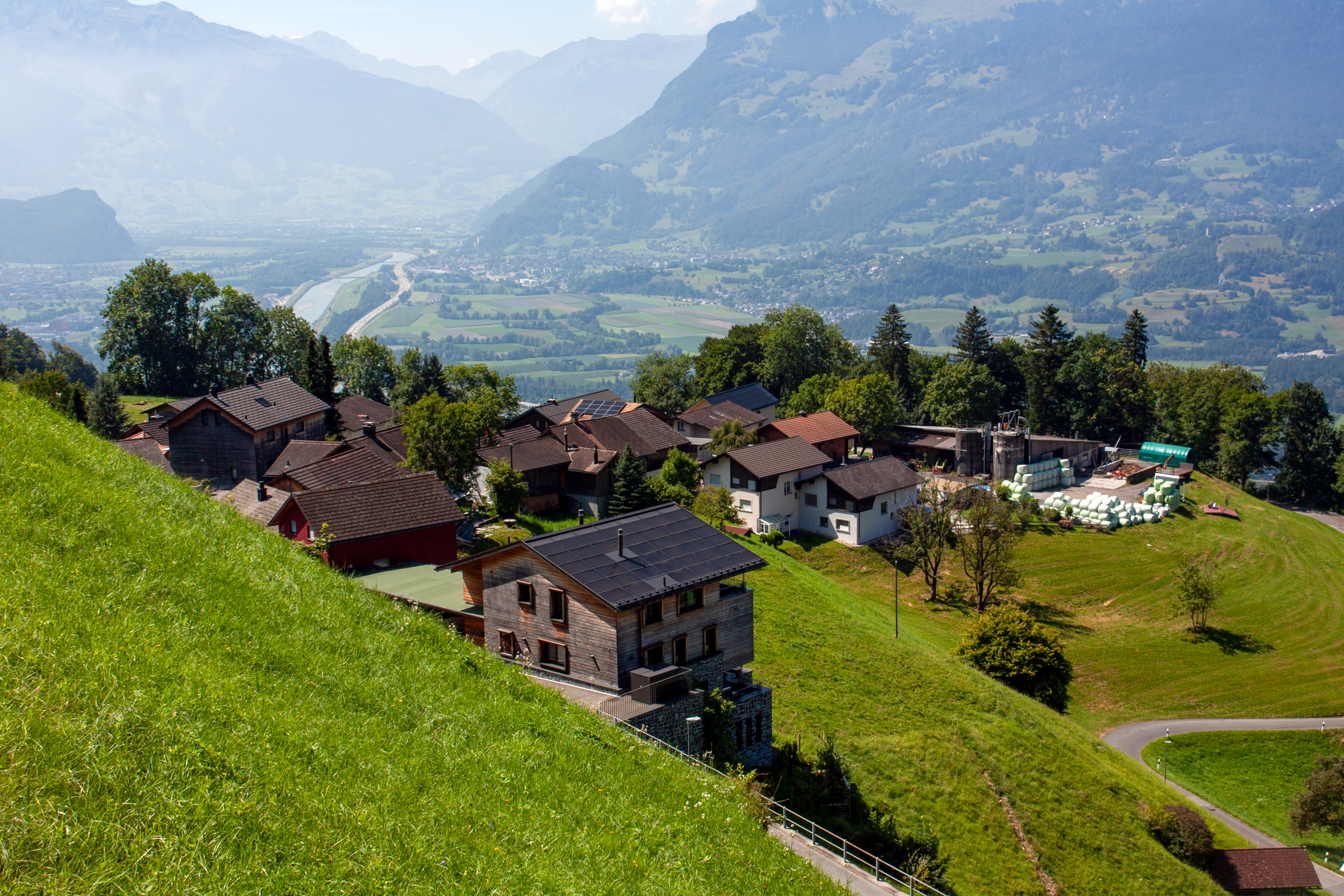
- Wangerberg in 2025

- Location in Liechtenstein
- Coordinates: 47°06′22″N 9°32′40″E
- Country: Liechtenstein
- Electoral district: Oberland
- Municipality: Triesenberg
- Elevation: 880 m (2,890 ft)
- Time zone: UTC+1 (CET)
  - Summer (DST): UTC+2 (CEST)
- Postal code: 9497
- Area code: (+423) ...

Wangerberg (German pronunciation: [ˈvaŋɐbɛʁk]; also spelled Wangerbärg) is a Weiler (hamlet) of Liechtenstein, located in the municipality of Triesenberg.

== Geography ==
The hamlet lies on a hill in front of Triesen, 2 km south of Triesenberg. It is crossed by the creek Dorfbach.
