= ISO 3166-2:LI =

Entry for Liechtenstein in ISO 3166-2

ISO 3166-2:LI is the entry for Liechtenstein in ISO 3166-2, part of the ISO 3166 standard published by the International Organization for Standardization (ISO), which defines codes for the names of the principal subdivisions (e.g., provinces or states) of all countries coded in ISO 3166-1.

Currently for Liechtenstein, ISO 3166-2 codes are defined for 11 communes.

Each code consists of two parts, separated by a hyphen. The first part is LI, the ISO 3166-1 alpha-2 code of Liechtenstein. The second part is two digits (01–11).

== Current codes ==
Subdivision names are listed as in the ISO 3166-2 standard published by the ISO 3166 Maintenance Agency (ISO 3166/MA).

Click on the button in the header to sort each column.

Code	Subdivision name (de)
LI-01	Balzers
LI-02	Eschen
LI-03	Gamprin
LI-04	Mauren
LI-05	Planken
LI-06	Ruggell
LI-07	Schaan
LI-08	Schellenberg
LI-09	Triesen
LI-10	Triesenberg
LI-11	Vaduz

== Changes ==
The following changes to the entry have been announced in newsletters by the ISO 3166/MA since the first publication of ISO 3166-2 in 1998:

Newsletter	Date issued	Description of change in newsletter	Code/Subdivision change
Newsletter I-8	2007-04-17	Addition of the administrative subdivisions and of their code elements	Subdivisions added: 11 communes

== See also ==
- Subdivisions of Liechtenstein
- FIPS region codes of Liechtenstein
- NUTS codes of Liechtenstein
- Neighbouring countries: AT, CH
