= NUTS statistical regions of Liechtenstein =

Overview about the NUTS statistical regions of

As a member of the EFTA, Liechtenstein (LI) is included in the Nomenclature of Territorial Units for Statistics (NUTS). The three NUTS levels all correspond to the country itself:

- NUTS-1: LI0 Liechtenstein
- NUTS-2: LI00 Liechtenstein
- NUTS-3: LI000 Liechtenstein

Below the NUTS levels, there are LAU: municipalities.

== See also ==
- Subdivisions of Liechtenstein
- Electoral District of Oberland
- Electoral District of Unterland
- ISO 3166-2 codes of Liechtenstein
- FIPS region codes of Liechtenstein

== Sources ==
- Hierarchical list of the Nomenclature of territorial units for statistics - NUTS and the Statistical regions of Europe
- Overview map of EFTA countries - Statistical regions at level 1
  - LIECHTENSTEIN - Statistical regions at level 2
  - LIECHTENSTEIN - Statistical regions at level 3
- Correspondence between the regional levels and the national administrative units
- Communes of Liechtenstein, Statoids.com
