= Mühleholz =

- Ortsteil
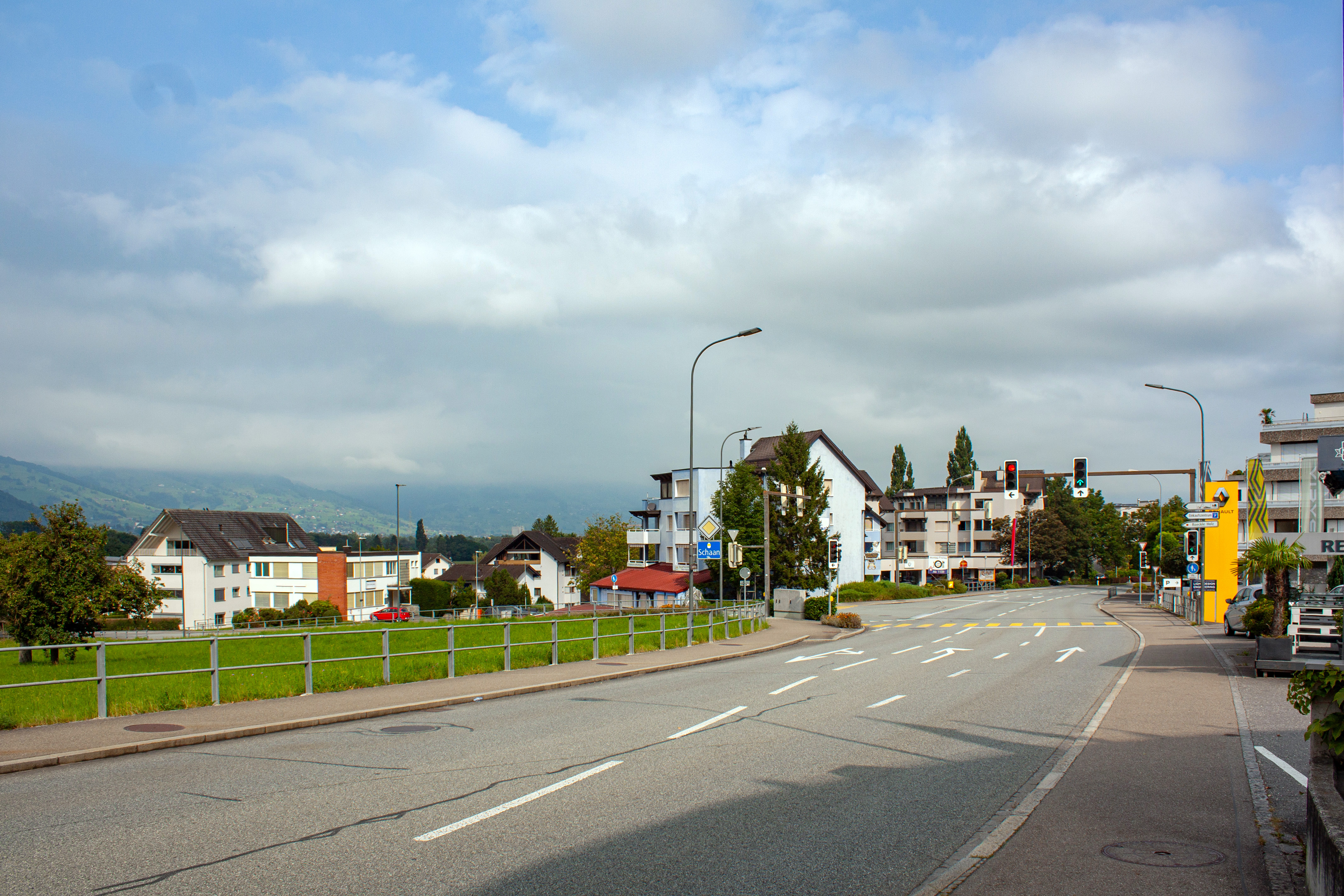

- Locator map of Mühleholz in Liechtenstein
- Coordinates: 47°09′N 9°31′E
- Country: Liechtenstein
- Electoral district: Oberland
- Municipality: Vaduz
- Elevation: 450 m (1,480 ft)
- Time zone: UTC+1 (CET)
  - Summer (DST): UTC+2 (CEST)
- Postal code: 9490
- Area code: (+423)

Mühleholz (German pronunciation: [ˈmyːləˌhɔlts]; also called Möliholz) is an Ortsteil in Liechtenstein located in the municipality of Vaduz.

== Geography ==
The village lies south of Schaan and north of Vaduz, a few kilometres away from the Swiss border. It is crossed by the Schaanstrasse.
