= Gaflei =

- Village
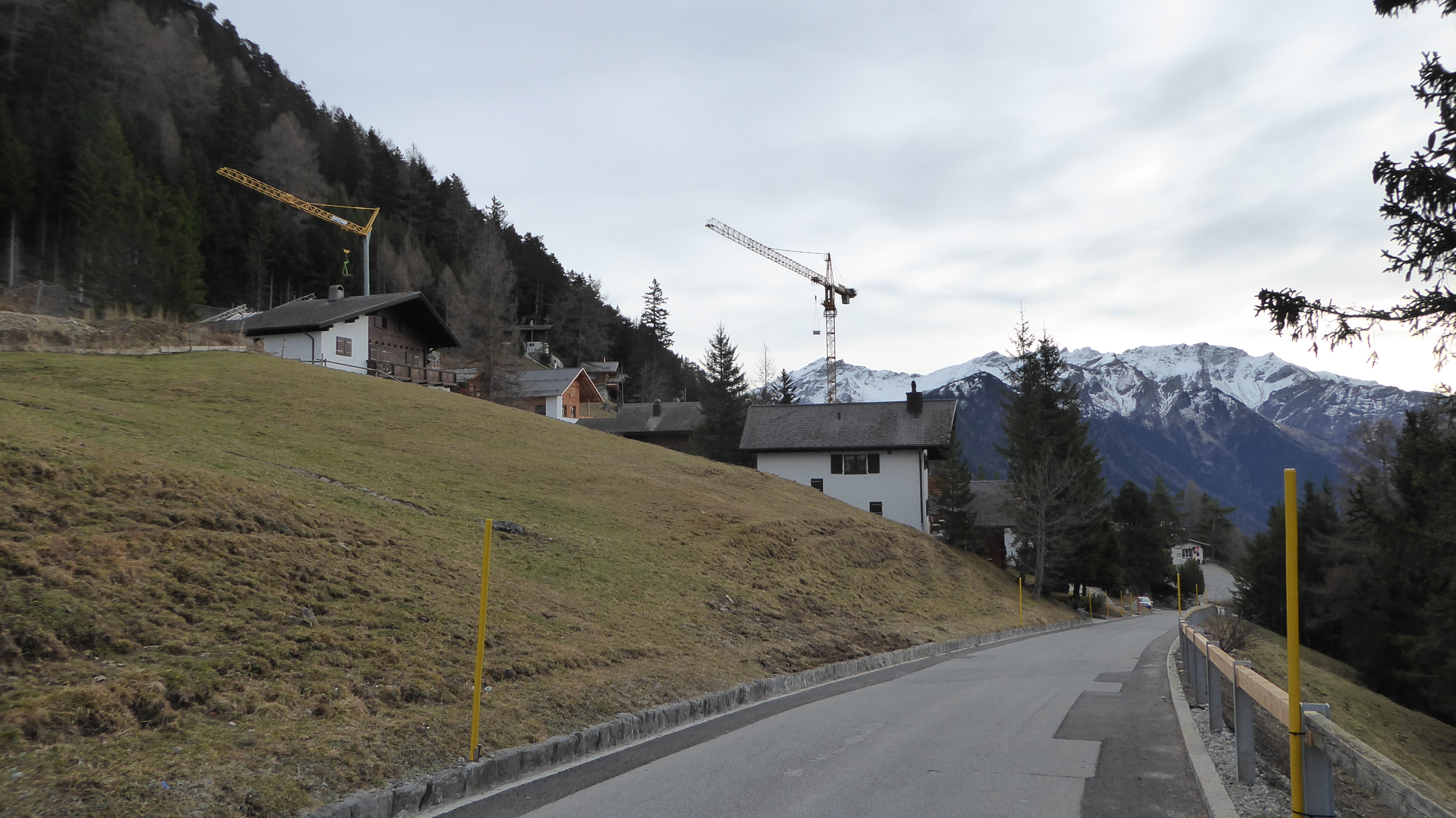
- Gaflei in 2023

- Locator map of Gaflei in Liechtenstein
- Coordinates: 47°8′32″N 9°32′41″E
- Country: Liechtenstein
- Electoral district: Oberland
- Municipality: Triesenberg
- Elevation: 1,488 m (4,882 ft)
- Time zone: UTC+1 (CET)
  - Summer (DST): UTC+2 (CEST)
- Postal code: 9497
- Area code: (+423) ...

Gaflei is a village of Liechtenstein, located in Triesenberg, the highest and largest municipality (by area) in the Oberland constituency of the country. It stands at approximately 1500 m above sea level. Gaflei developed from settlements of the Walser people in the Middle Ages. The geographical centre of Liechtenstein is located at the Alp Bargälla, east of Gaflei.

== History ==
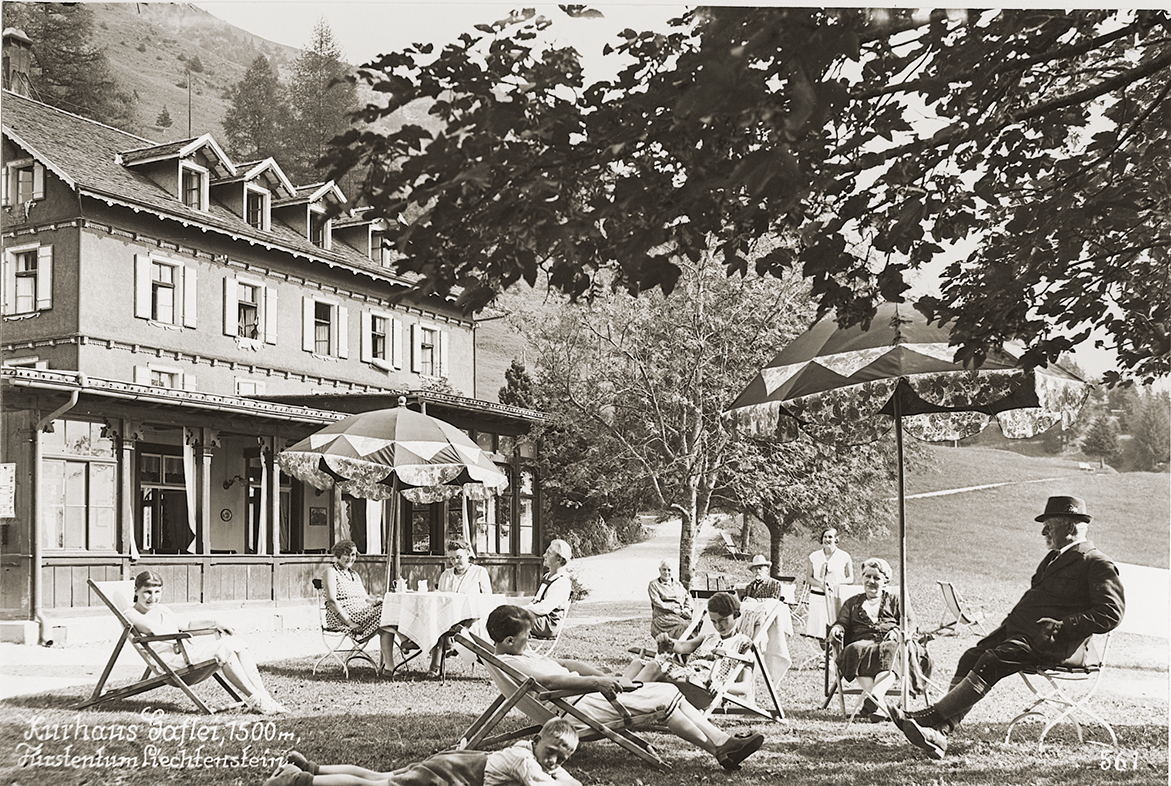
The former health resort in Gaflei, pictured in 1930

Karl Schädler purchased property at Gaflei at the end of the 19th century, and at considerable cost developed a spa there. Gaflei became the first health resort in Liechtenstein and is still a popular area for recreation and excursion to this day. From 1930 to 1955, the resort was managed by Rudolf Schädler, who was involved in the persecution and attempted abduction of Fritz and Alfred Rotter, Berlin-based Jewish directors and theatre operators who had obtained citizenship from Liechtenstein in order to escape Nazi persecution. Alfred and his wife Gertrud died while fleeing from Schädler and his accomplices, who were later imprisoned for their part in the deaths.

In 1976, Gaflei hosted a stage of the Tour de Suisse and was considered one of the most challenging stages in the race's history.

== Hiking ==
Gaflei is a starting point and destination for various hiking trails, including the Fürstensteig route.
