= Rotenboden =

- Weiler
- Locator map of Rotenboden in Liechtenstein
- Coordinates: 47°07′45″N 9°32′20″E
- Country: Liechtenstein
- Electoral district: Oberland
- Municipality: Triesenberg
- Elevation: 850 m (2,790 ft)
- Time zone: UTC+1 (CET)
  - Summer (DST): UTC+2 (CEST)
- Postal code: 9497
- Area code: (+423) ...

Rotenboden (German pronunciation: [ˈʁoːtn̩ˌboːdn̩]; also spelled Rotaboda) is a Weiler (hamlet) of Liechtenstein, located in the municipality of Triesenberg. It is the highest settlement in Liechtenstein at 850m elevation.

== Geography ==
It is a mountain village that lies above Vaduz and Triesen, in the center of the country to the north of Triesenberg.
