= Marco Schädler =

Liechtenstein composer

Marco Schädler (born 2 March 1964, in Triesenberg) is a composer from Liechtenstein. He studied music at the conservatory in Feldkirch, Austria.

== Life and career ==
As a child, Marco Schädler played music together with his father. At the age of nine, he became a temporary organist in the parish church of Triesenberg, and in Triesen. He was organist until 1998. From 1982 to 1988, he held a part-time position as a piano teacher at the Liechtenstein Music School. He has been a freelance artist and composer since 1988 (theater and ballet music, masses, orchestras, choral and chamber music, sound installations for film and various performances).

Schädler studied piano, music theory, musical composition, early music theory and jazz theory at the Vorarlberg State Conservatory in Feldkirch, at the City of Basel Music Academy and at the St. Gallen Jazz School.

He was a member of the “Liechtensteiner Gabarett” (“Das LiGa”, 1994–2006), since 2009 of OOS. In 1997, he founded the Free Institute for Music, a school for composing and teaching music theory on a creative basis. Schädler co-founded the Schlösslekeller theater in Vaduz in 2003 and co-founded the company RequiemForYou. From 2009 to 2013, he was managing director of the Historical Association for the Principality of Liechtenstein. Since 2013, he has been the main organist in the Reformed Church of Buchs in St. Gallen, Switzerland.

His works were premiered by the Virtuosi di Praga in Prague, the Amati Quartet and the Ripieno Orchestra. He worked with the Italian director Firenza Guidi and with the Viennese author Barbara Frischmuth.

== Compositions and publications ==
- Barbara Frischmuth: A Brief History of Humanity. Dramatization for "Optical Concert". Music: Marco Schädler, concept, adaptation, direction: Johannes Rausch. Choreography: Guillermo Horta Betancourt. Feldkirch: Chamber of Labor, 1994.
- Virtuosi di Praga, Play: Marco Schadler (Hieronyma, Funeral of a Blue Terrier, Cellissima). 1995
- Gnome Nose. Chamber opera based on Wilhelm Hauff. Director: Johannes Rausch, Music: Marco Schädler. 2003
