= Rotter kidnapping =

1933 organized kidnapping in Liechtenstein

Coordinates: 47°08′35″N 9°32′40″E

Rotter kidnappings
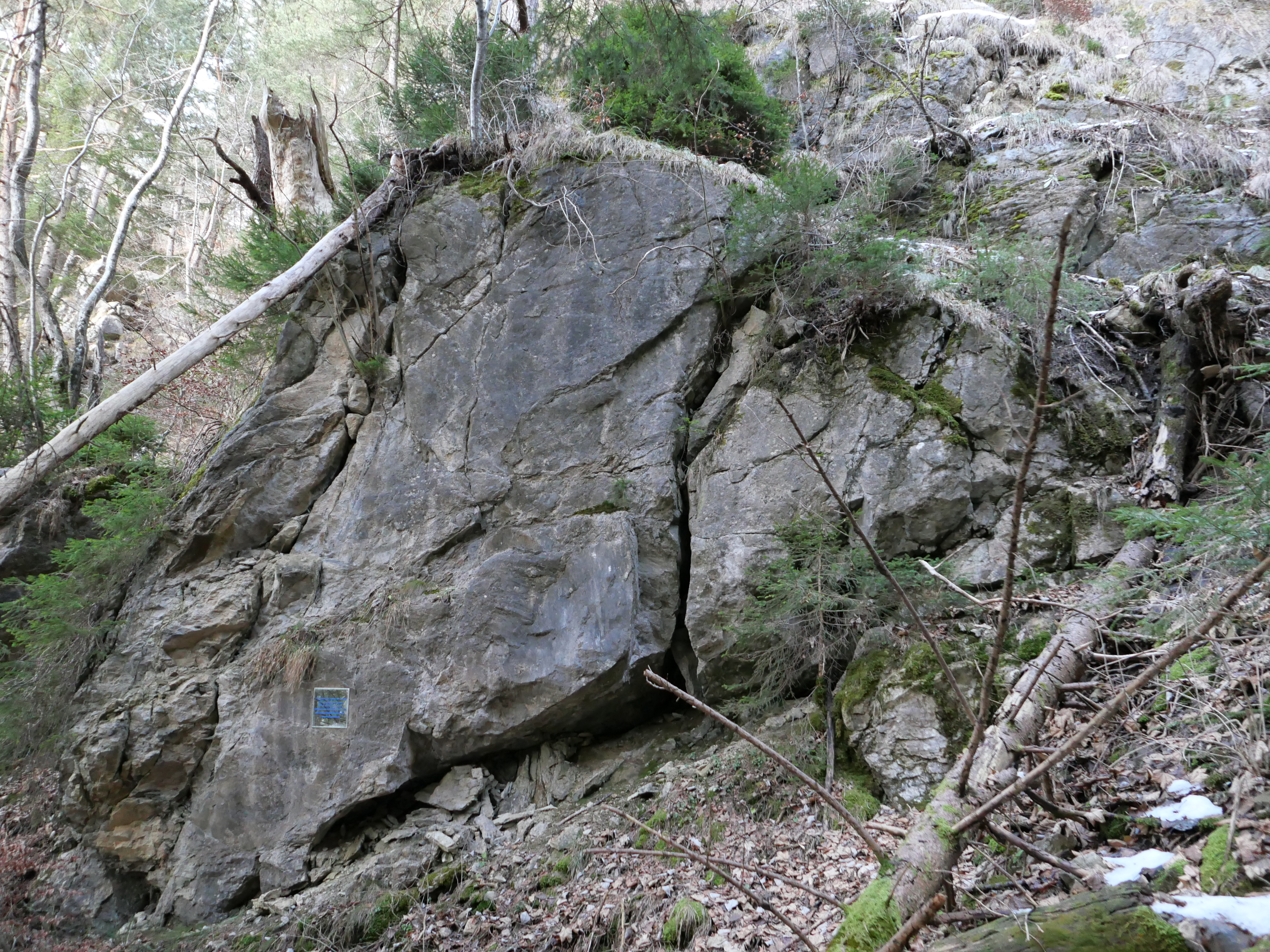
- The rock in the ravine where Alfred and Gertrud Rotter fell to their deaths.
- Location: Gaflei, Liechtenstein
- Date: 5 April 1933; 93 years ago
- Attack type: Kidnapping
- Victims: Fritz Rotter; Alfred Rotter †; Gertrud Rotter †; Julie Wolff
- Perpetrators: Rudolf Schädler; Franz Roeckle; Peter Rheinbeger; Eugen Frommelt; 5 unknown German nationals
- Motive: Nazism
- Verdict: Pleaded guilty
- Convictions: Between three months and one year in prison

On 5 April 1933, Liechtenstein citizens sympathetic to Nazi Germany attempted and failed to kidnap Fritz and Alfred Rotter, German film directors and theatre managers of Jewish background, in Liechtenstein. The attack was supported by five German nationals within the country.

== Background ==
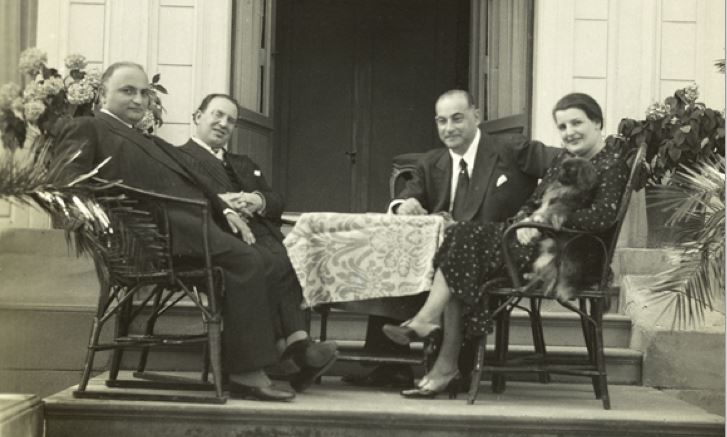
From left to right: Fritz Rotter, the operetta singer Richard Tauber, Alfred Rotter and his wife Gertrud, in July 1931 in front of the spa hotel in Bad Ragaz, near Liechtenstein.

Fritz and Alfred Rotter worked as writers and composers and owned multiple successful theatres in Berlin during the era of the Weimar Republic. However, by 1933 due to the two men's Jewish backgrounds, they were the target of pressure contemporaneous with the rise of Nazism in Germany, and in January 1933, they were forced to declare bankruptcy and emigrate to Liechtenstein. They had previously succeeded in being naturalized in the country in 1931 as a result of a wider initiative by the Liechtenstein government. Prime Minister Josef Hoop attempted to use private contacts and offering informal support to the German government, where he considered appealing to Otto Meissner in order for the press attacks to end.

However, due to this, Liechtenstein became the target of attacks by German press outlets. In particular, the Rotters became the target of attacks from the press, which falsely accused them of faking their bankruptcy and transferring their money abroad. As a result, it was publicly demanded that the two men be extradited back to Nazi Germany to face trial. Liechtensteiner Nazis Rudolf Schädler, Franz Roeckle, Peter Rheinbeger, and Eugen Frommelt used the German press demands as an impetus to kidnap the two men and forcefully extradite them, which was intended to coincide with the formation of an organized Nazi Party in Liechtenstein.

== Kidnapping ==
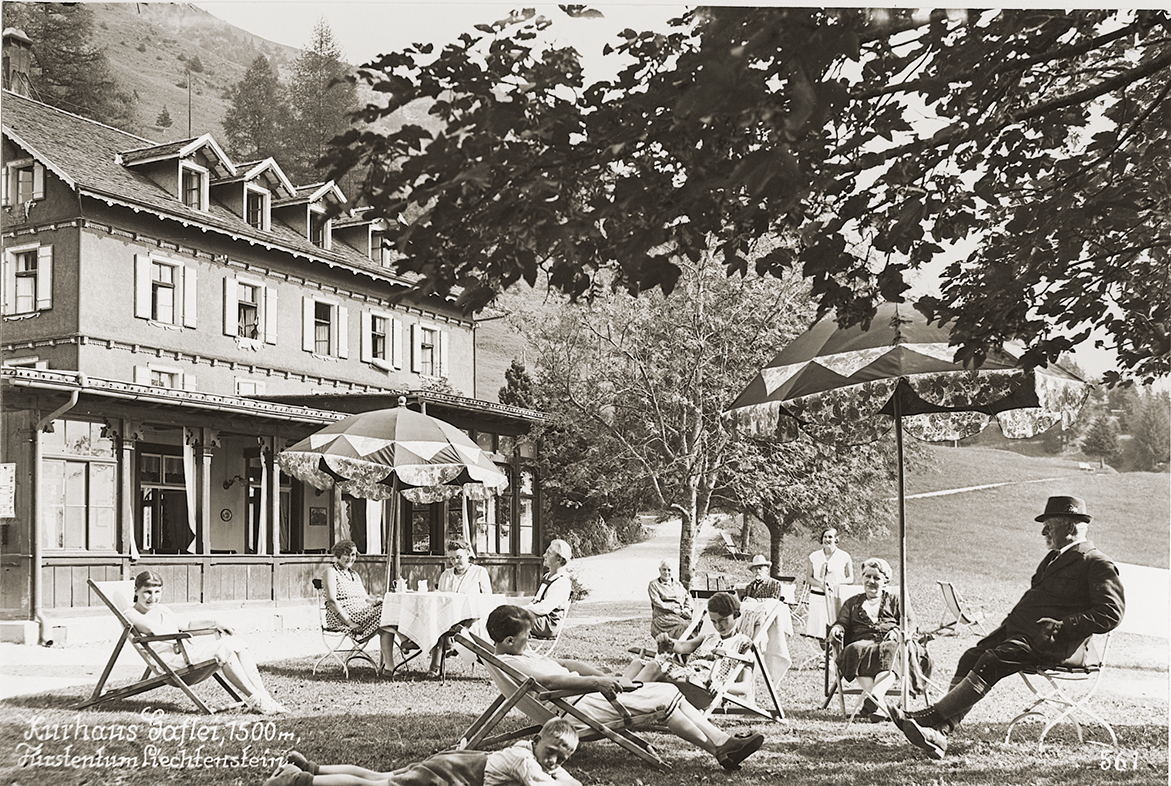
The health resort in Gaflei, the location of the kidnapping, pictured in 1930

On 5 April 1933, Fritz and Alfred Rotter, along with Alfred's wife, Gertrud Rotter, and Fritz's domestic partner, Julie Wolff, were convinced by Schädler to stay at a health resort in Gaflei on one of the Alps, which he managed. Once they arrived, four men, along with five other German nationals, attempted to kidnap them and throw them into cars. This was unsuccessful; they fought back and escaped on foot.

Shortly afterwards, Alfred and Gertrud fell into a nearby ravine to their deaths while fleeing the kidnappers. Around the same time, Fritz was tricked by one of the kidnappers into getting into his car under the false pretext of aiding him to safety, though once he realized his mistake, he managed to overpower the driver and jump out of the car, breaking his shoulder in the process. Following this, he was able to re-unite with Julie Wolff, who was also injured, and managed to reach safety and inform the Liechtenstein government.

== Trials and aftermath ==
Following the kidnapping attempt, three of the men involved were arrested in Liechtenstein, while the rest were caught while attempting to flee through Götzis in Austria and then extradited back to Liechtenstein. In June 1933, the men went on trial for the kidnapping. Notably, however, both the deaths of Alfred and Gertrud and the political motivation behind the kidnapping were deliberately downplayed in order to avoid further German press attacks. Fritz Rotter's lawyer, Wladimir Rosenbaum, was prevented from reading his plea where he directly criticized the Nazis' use of violence. In addition, approximately 700 signatures were gathered demanding the German men involved be pardoned.

Schädler was sentenced to one year in prison, and Roeckle, Rheinbeger and Frommelt to four months. Four of the German men involved were separately sentenced to three months in a court in Konstanz. In October of the same year, it was agreed that in order for German press attacks against Liechtenstein to come to an end, Schädler and Rheinbeger would be released from prison early. Schädler was released the following month.

In response to the kidnapping, naturalizations in Liechtenstein were discontinued until further notice, which the Liechtensteiner Nachrichten newspaper criticized. In addition, the Liechtenstein government sent a diplomatic protest on 9 April 1933 to Nazi Germany and urged for both governments to work towards an end to the press attacks. However, Liechtenstein's desire to work with Germany independently contradicted the agreement with Switzerland, as such Switzerland expressed its desire for no independent meeting to be held between Liechtenstein and Germany to solve the issue. As a result, 6 October 1933 a conference was held in Berlin with representatives from Germany and Switzerland, with Hoop representing Liechtenstein. At the conference, he defended the country against the allegations made by the German press. The Reich ministry demanded that Liechtenstein revise its naturalization policy, to which Hoop complied. In addition, Schädler and Rheinbeger, who were still in prison, were to be released early, and both men were released the following month. In exchange for these concessions, German press attacks came to an end.

The kidnappings and subsequent trials temporarily delayed the formation of an organized Nazi Party in Liechtenstein; it would not be formed until 1938, as the German National Movement in Liechtenstein (VBDL) with Schädler as its initial leader. Fritz Rotter and his wife shortly after left Liechtenstein, and with assistance from Wladimir Rosenbaum, lived in exile in France until Fritz's death in 1939.

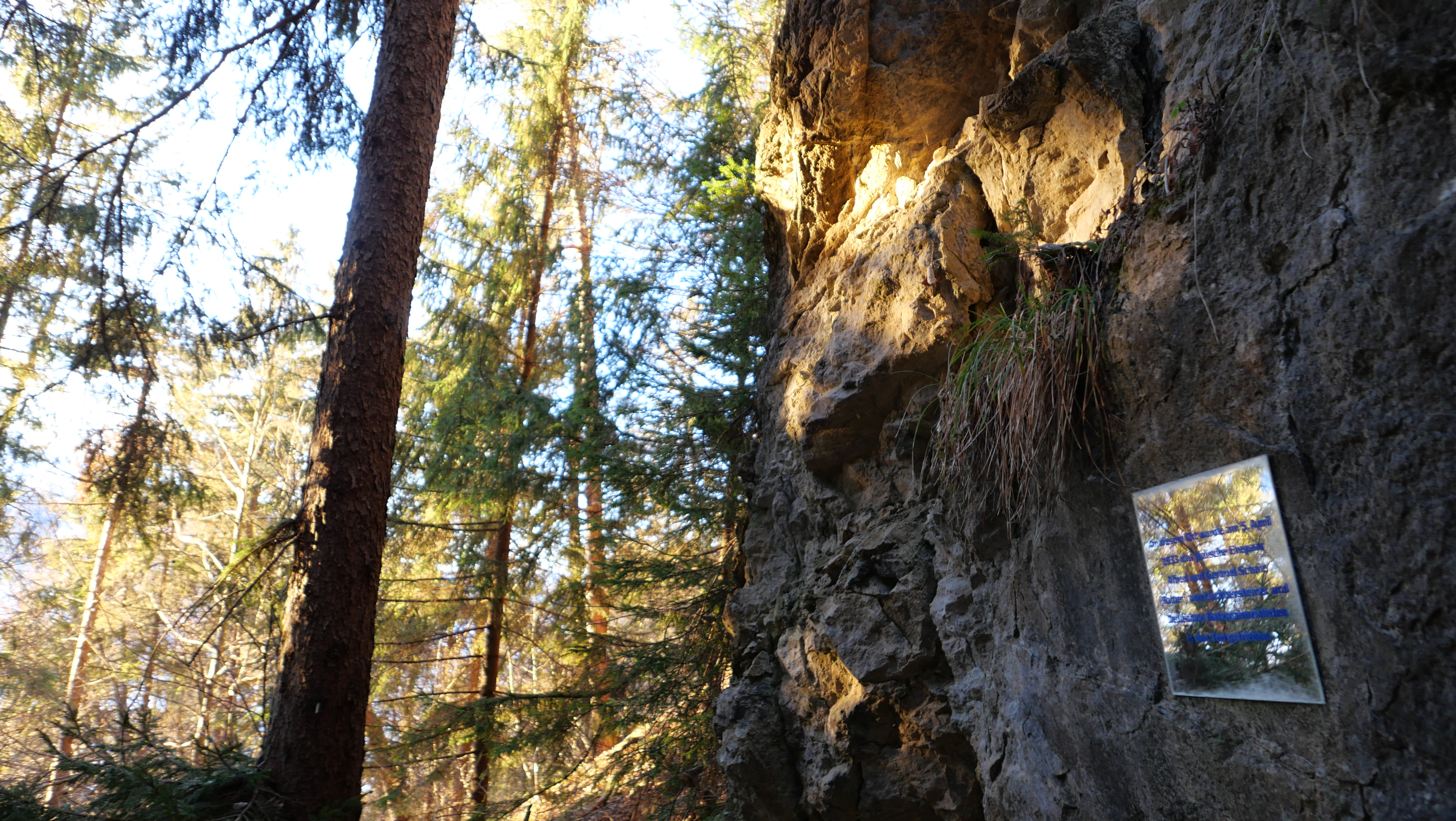
The plaque in 2024.

On April 5, 2002, a group of activists set up a commemorative plaque at the foot of the rock where Alfred and Gertrud Rotter fell to their deaths. The mirror, which was created by Liechtensteiner artist Hansjörg Quaderer, bears the inscription "An diesem Ort wurde am 5. April 1933 das jüdische Ehepaar Alfred und Gertrud Schaie (Rotter) von Liechtensteiner und Deutschen Nationalsozialisten in den Tod getrieben." ("On April 5, 1933, the Jewish couple Alfred and Gertrud Schaie (Rotter) were driven to their deaths at this place by Liechtensteiner and German Nazis.")

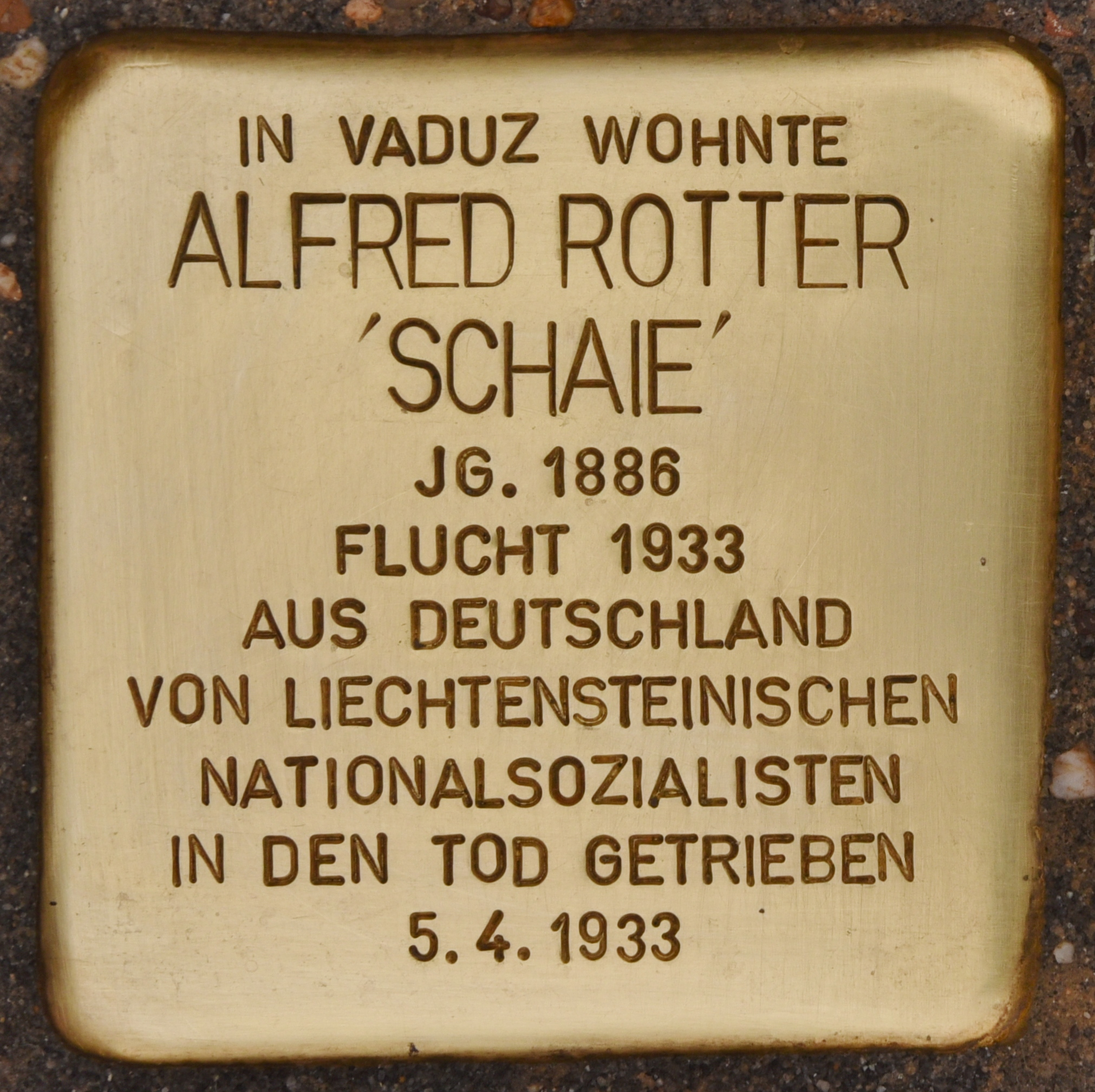
Stolperstein for Alfred Rotter

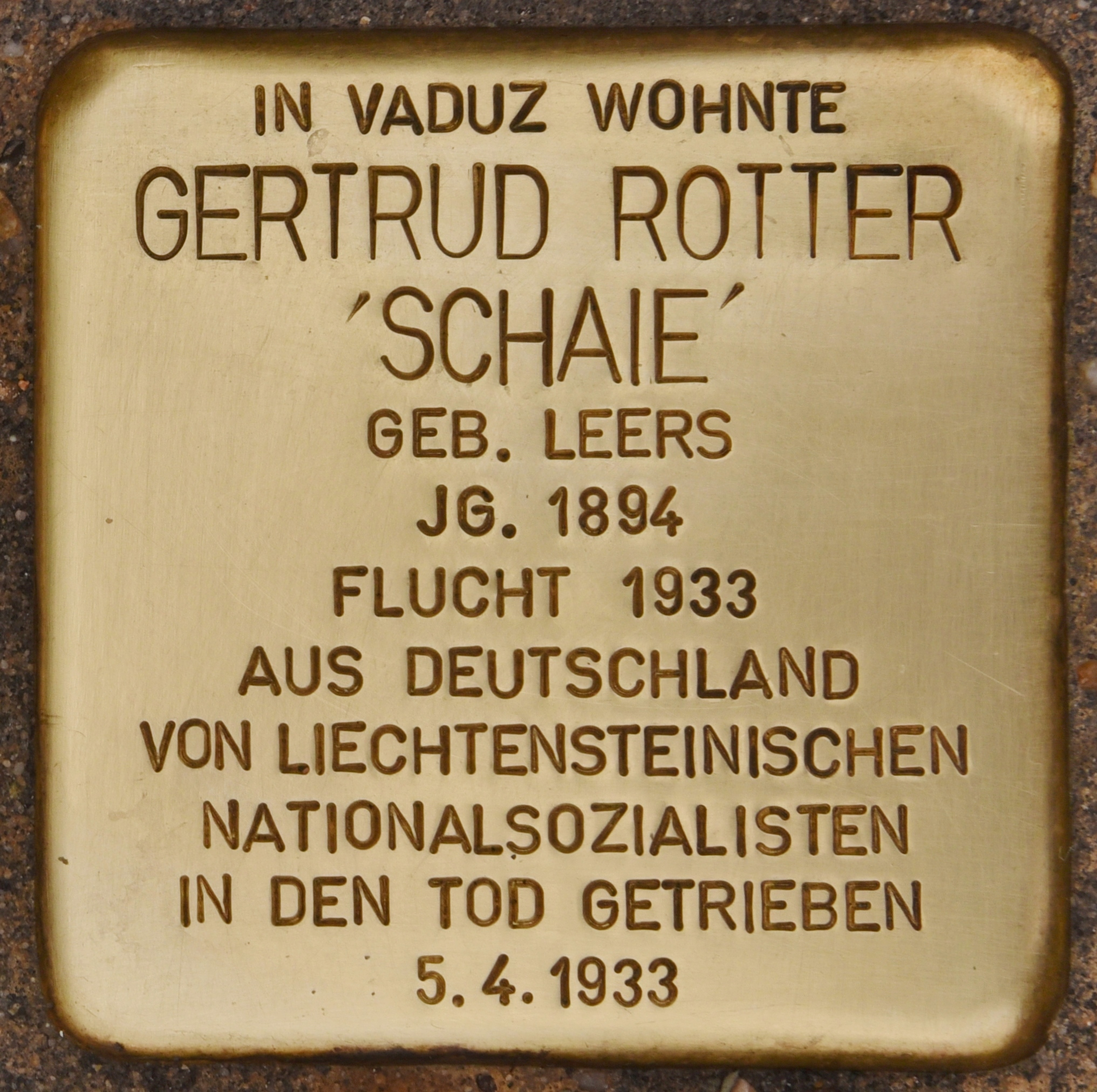
Stolperstein for Gertrud Rotter

In August 2022, two Stolpersteins were placed in the centre of Liechtenstein's capital Vaduz to commemorate Alfred and Gertrud Rotter. A Stolperstein—the German word for "stumbling block"—is a ten-centimetre, cobblestone-sized concrete cube bearing a brass plate inscribed with the name and life dates of victims of Nazi extermination or persecution. The Stolpersteine project was initiated by the German artist Gunter Demnig in 1992 and has become the project the world's largest memorial with plaques in some 30 countries. The Stolpersteine for the Rotters were the first ones of their kind in Liechtenstein and placed by Katja Demnig, the wife of Gunter Demnig. The commemoration was initiated by an interest group of citizens and supported by the communal administration of Vaduz.
