= Helmuth Matt =

Liechtenstein chemist and politician (1946–2018)

Member of the Landtag of Liechtenstein for Oberland
- In office 2 February 1986 – 7 February 1993

Personal details
- Born: 16 July 1946; Grabs, Switzerland
- Died: 20 April 2018 (aged 71)
- Political party: Patriotic Union
- Spouse: Johanna Schmid (m. 1980)
- Children: 1

Helmuth Matt (16 July 1946 – 20 April 2018) was a chemist and politician from Liechtenstein who served in the Landtag of Liechtenstein from 1986 to 1993.

Matt conducted a matura at the Liechtenstein Gymnasium in 1966 and then studied chemistry at the University of Basel, where he received a doctorate in 1976. He founded Dr. Matt AG chemical-analytical laboratory in Schaan.

He died of an unspecified illness on 20 April 2018, aged 71 years old. He lived in Schaan.

== Bibliography ==
- Vogt, Paul (1987). 125 Jahre Landtag (in German). Vaduz: Landtag of the Principality of Liechtenstein.
