= Valüna =

- Alp
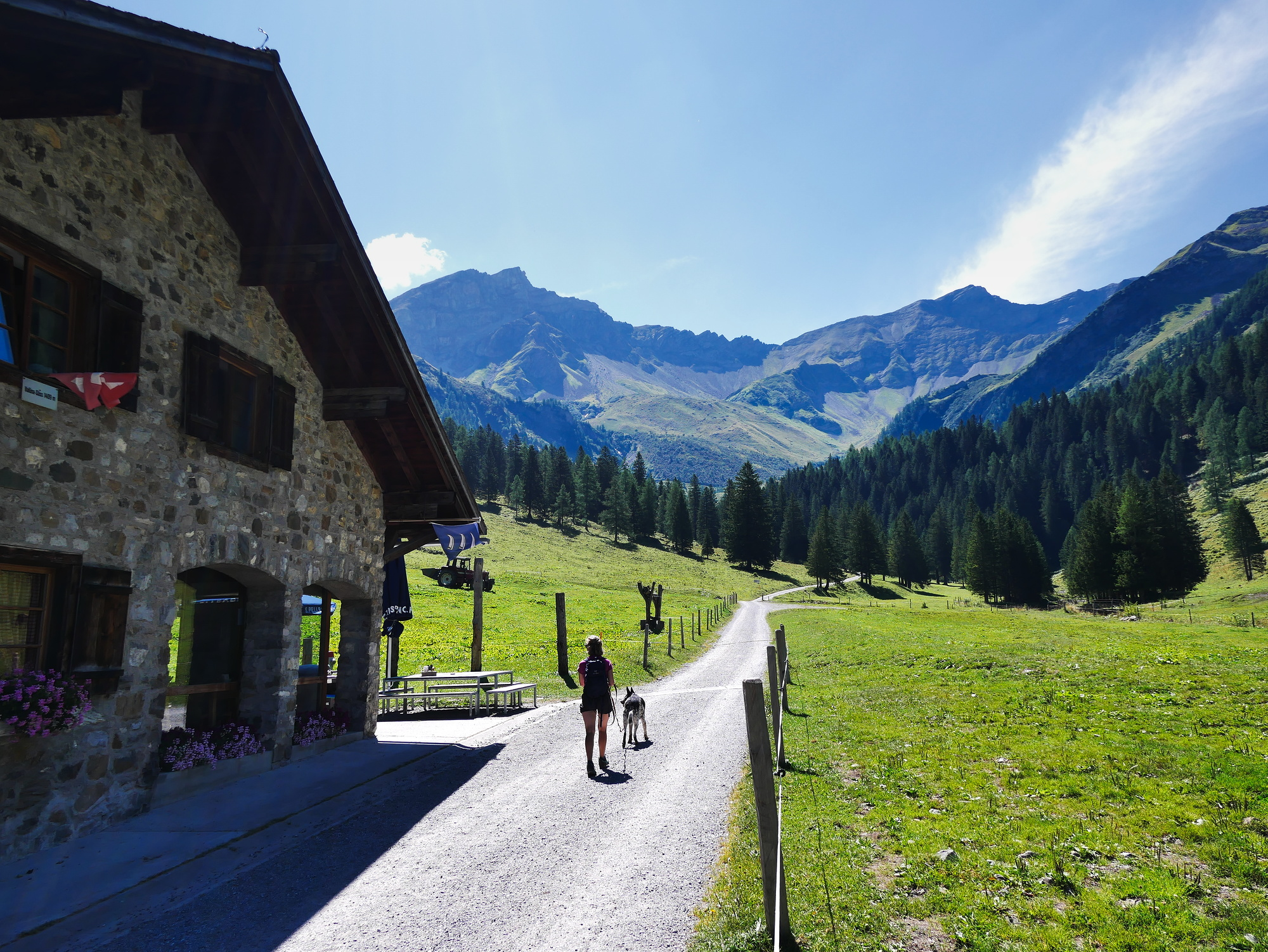
- Valüna in 2022

- Location in Liechtenstein
- Coordinates: 47.084867°N 9.587985°E
- Country: Liechtenstein
- Electoral district: Oberland
- Municipality: Triesen
- Time zone: UTC+1 (CET)
  - Summer (DST): UTC+2 (CEST)

Valüna is an Alp (alpine pasture) in Liechtenstein located in the municipality of Triesen. It was first mentioned in 1378 as "Vallúl".
