= Steg, Liechtenstein =

Steg
- Village
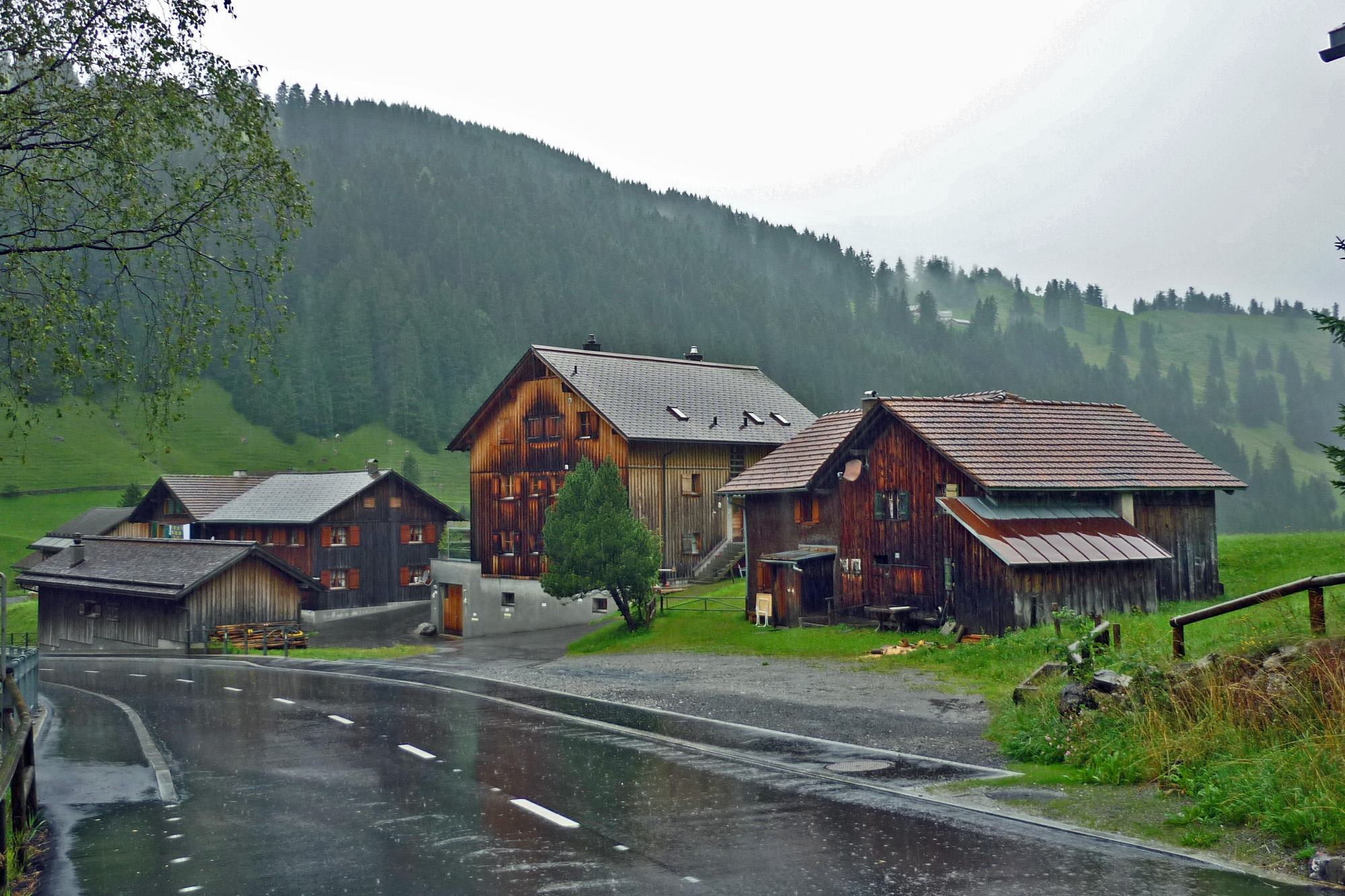
- Houses of Steg in 2014

- Locator map of Steg in Liechtenstein
- Coordinates: 47°06′46″N 9°34′31″E
- Country: Liechtenstein
- Electoral district: Oberland
- Municipality: Triesenberg
- Elevation: 1,303 m (4,275 ft)
- Time zone: UTC+1 (CET)
  - Summer (DST): UTC+2 (CEST)
- Postal code: 9497
- Area code: (+423) ...

Steg ([ʃteːɡ]) is a village in Liechtenstein, located in the municipality of Triesenberg.

== Sports ==
Liechtenstein's only ski jumping hill was situated here until 1982. Steg is a popular destination for multi-sport.

== Gallery ==
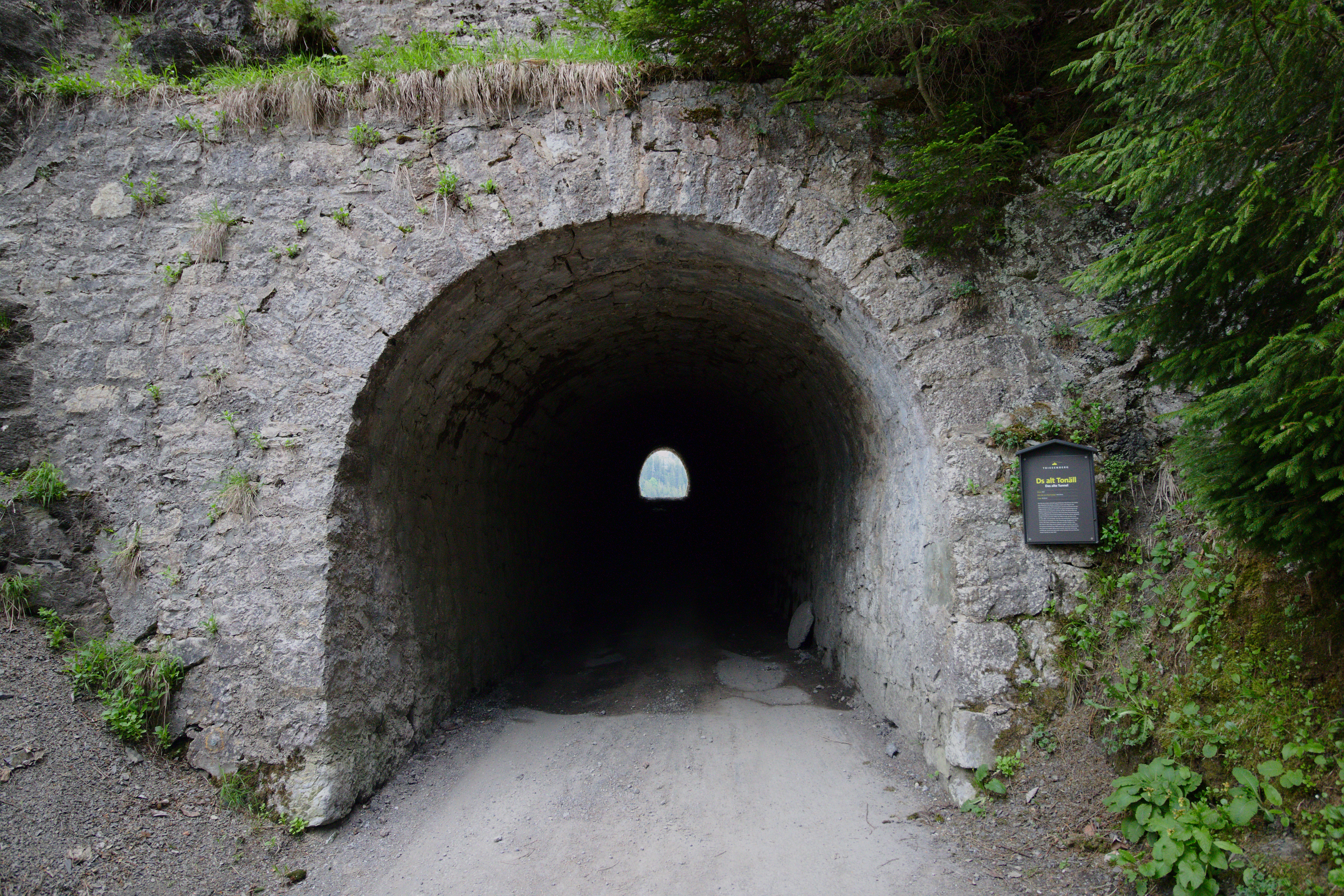
Old tunnel Gnalp – Steg

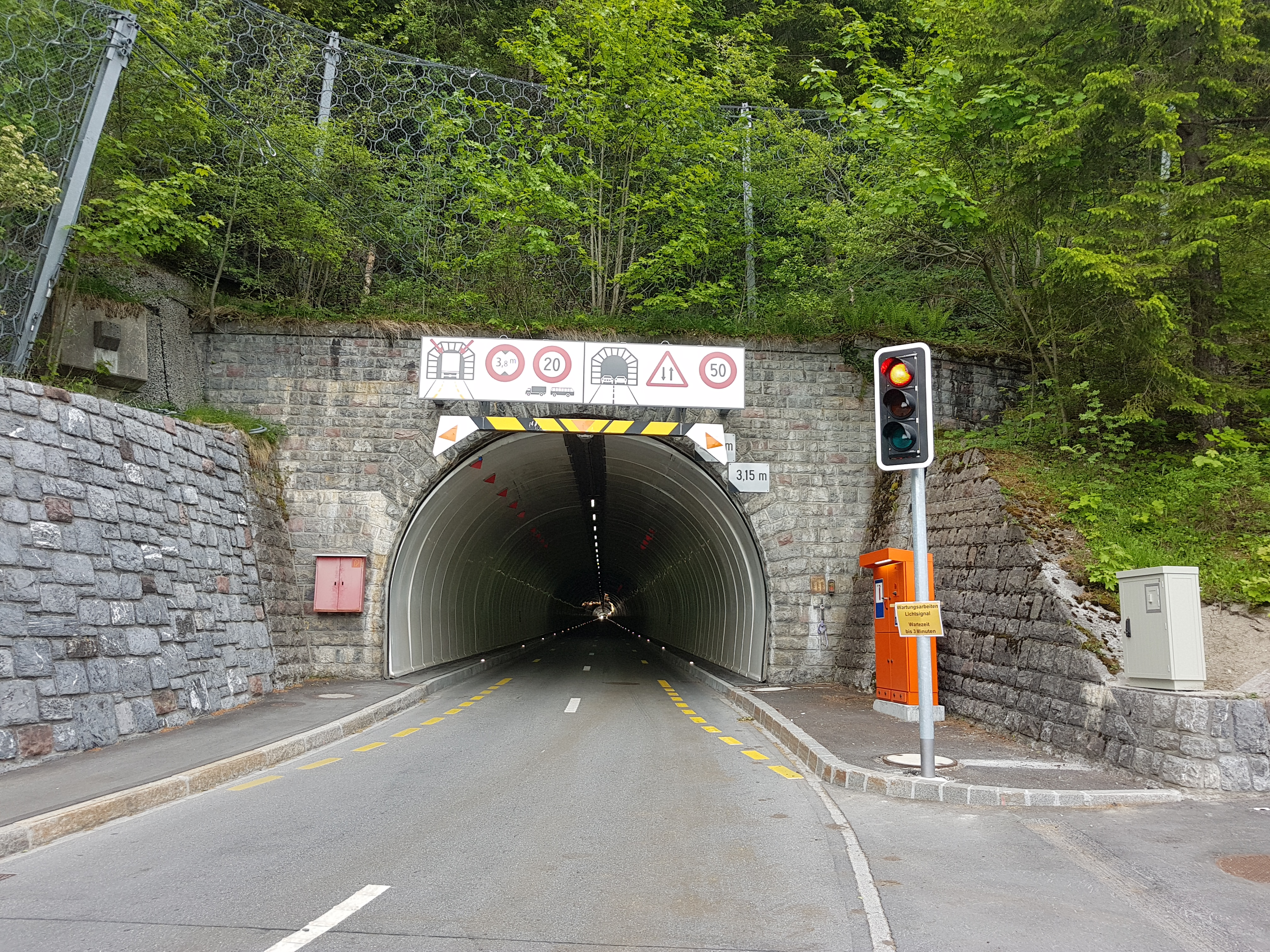
New tunnel Gnalp – Steg

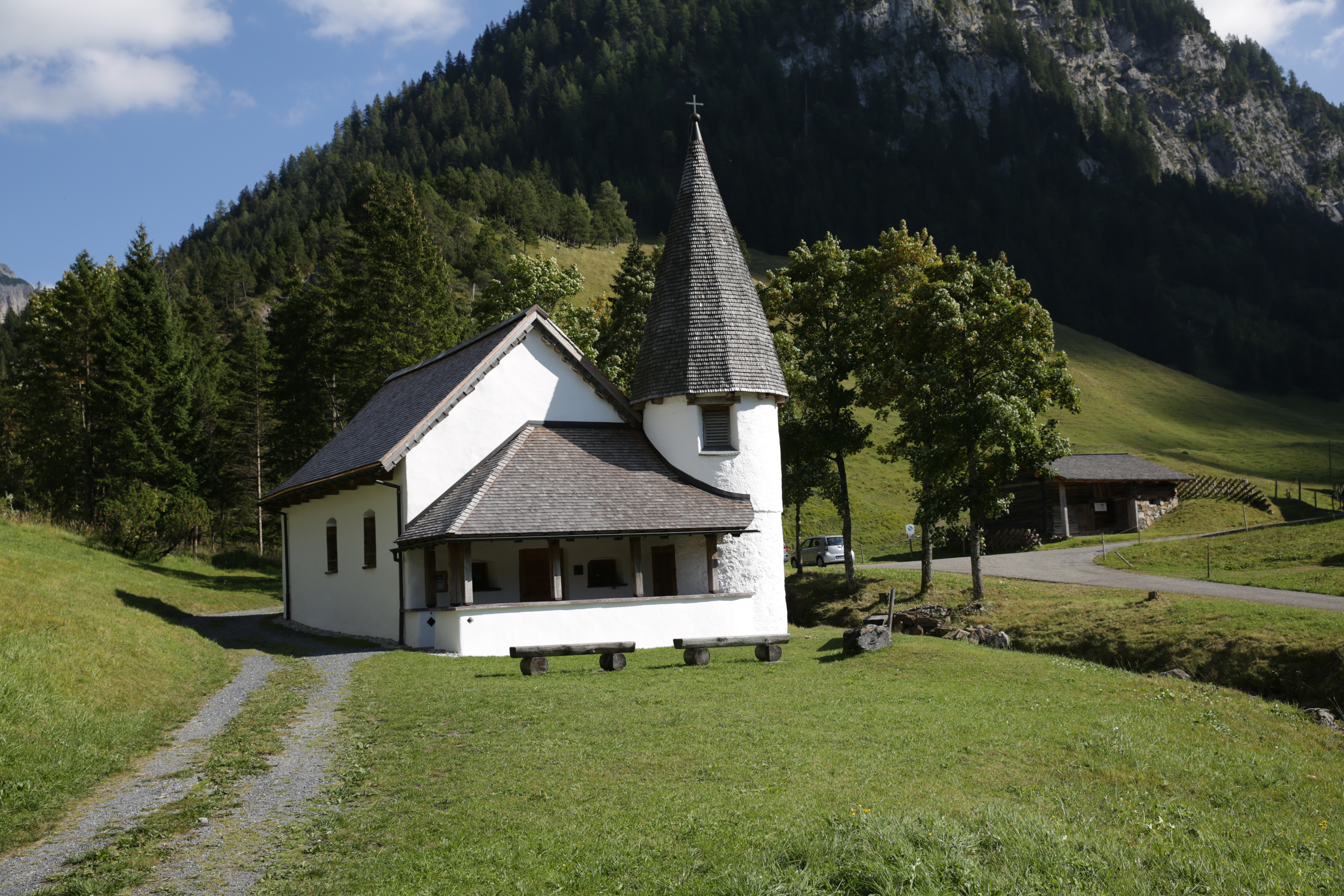
Chapel St. Wendelin and St. Martin
