= Triesenberg =

- Municipality
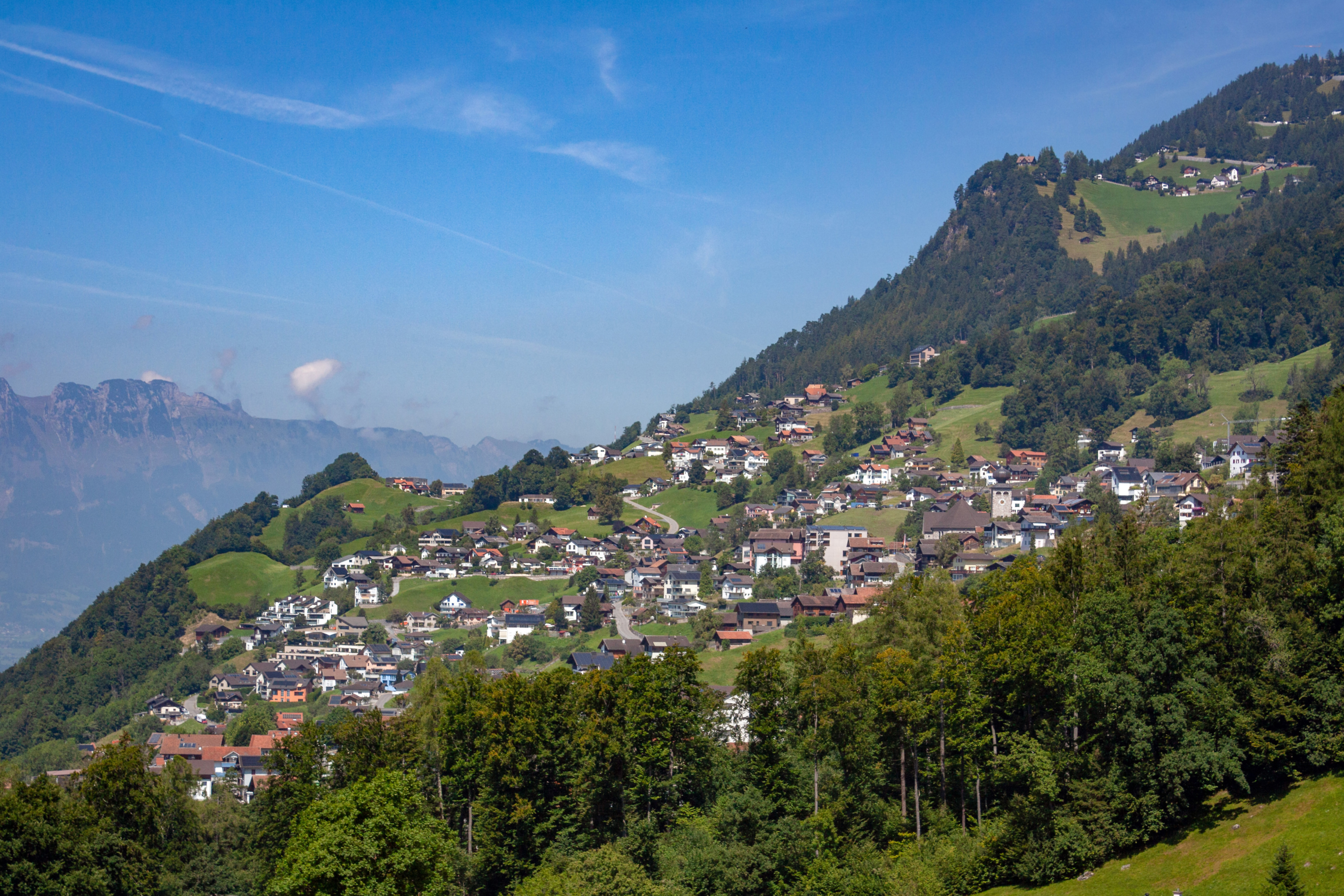
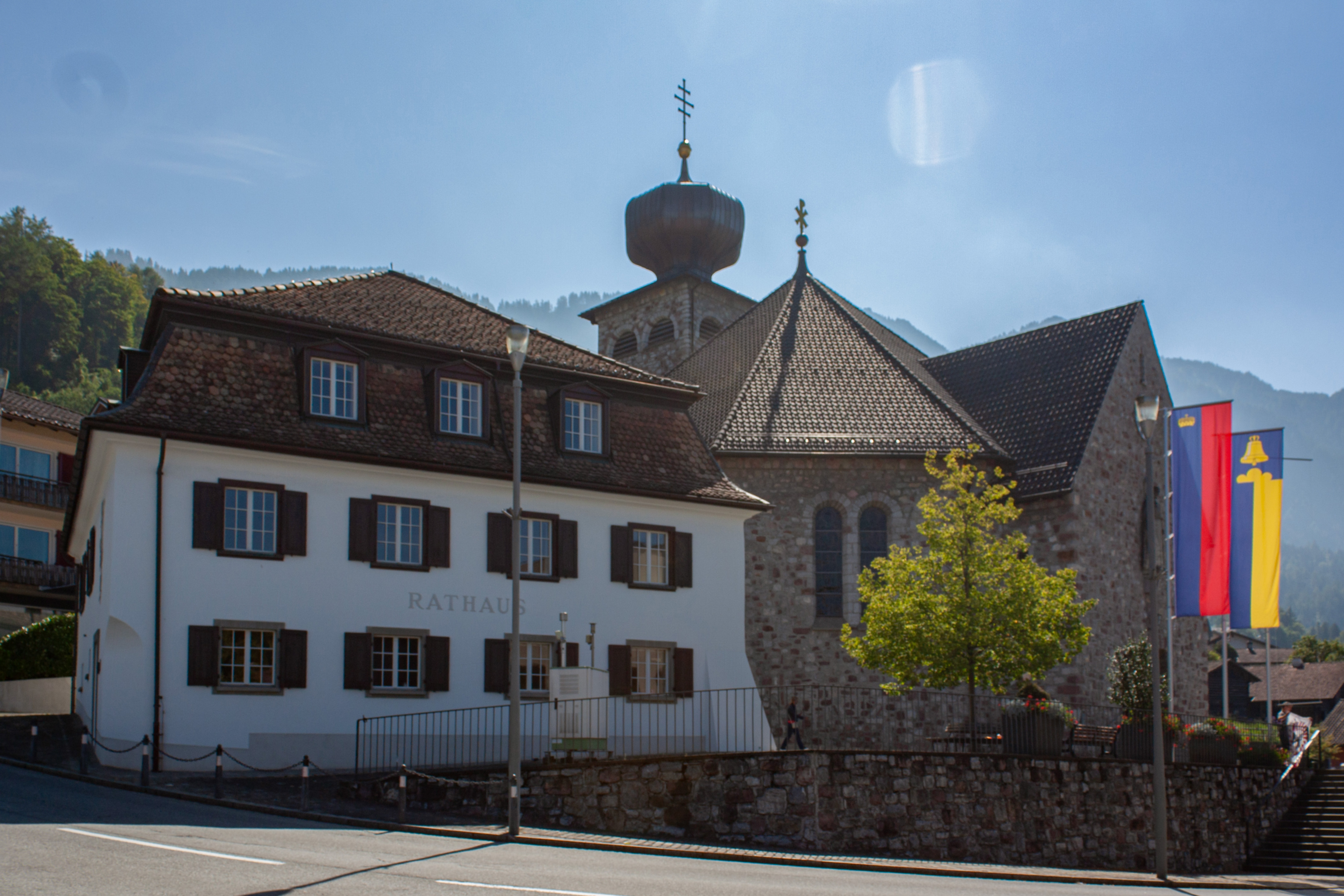
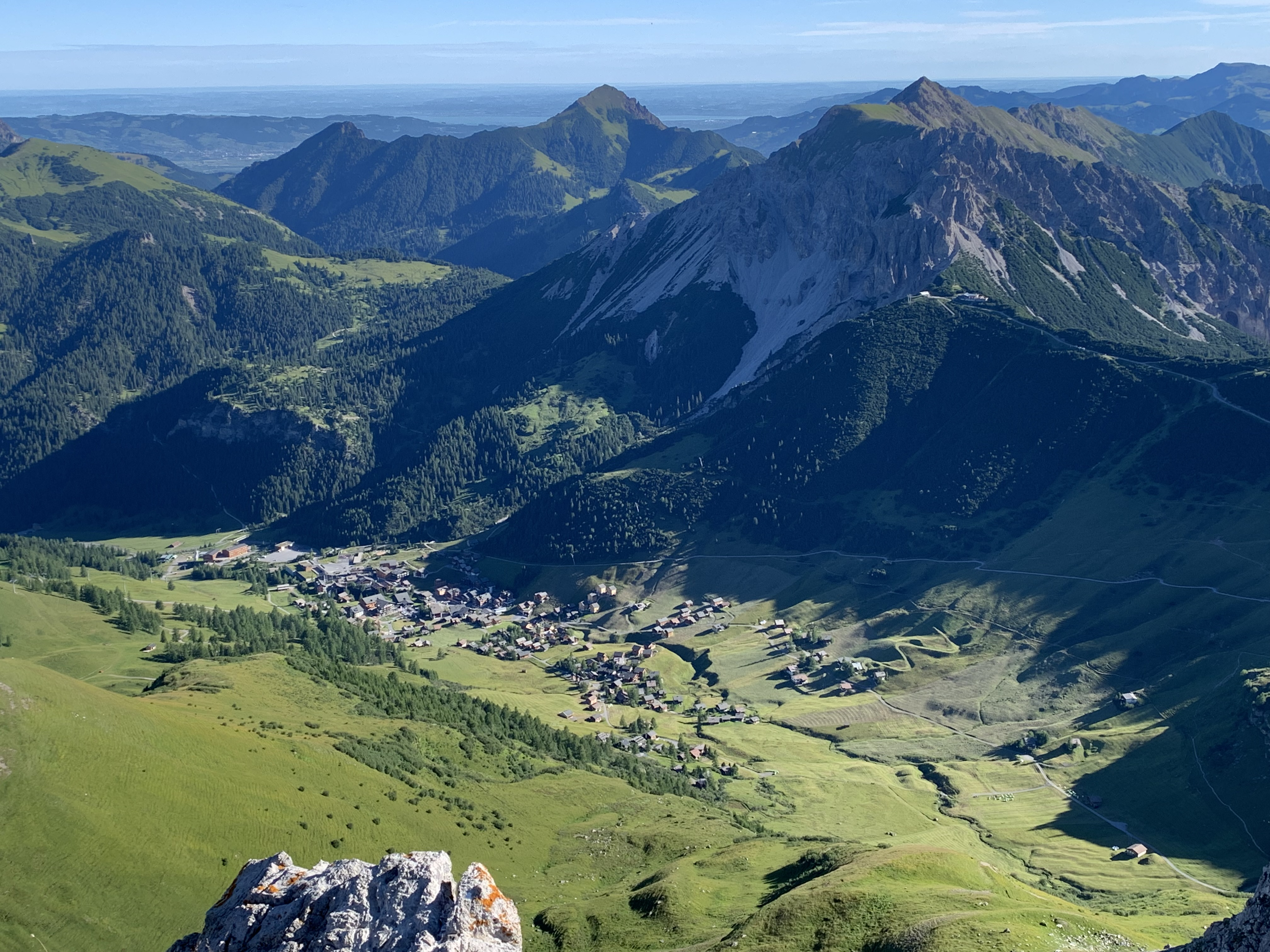
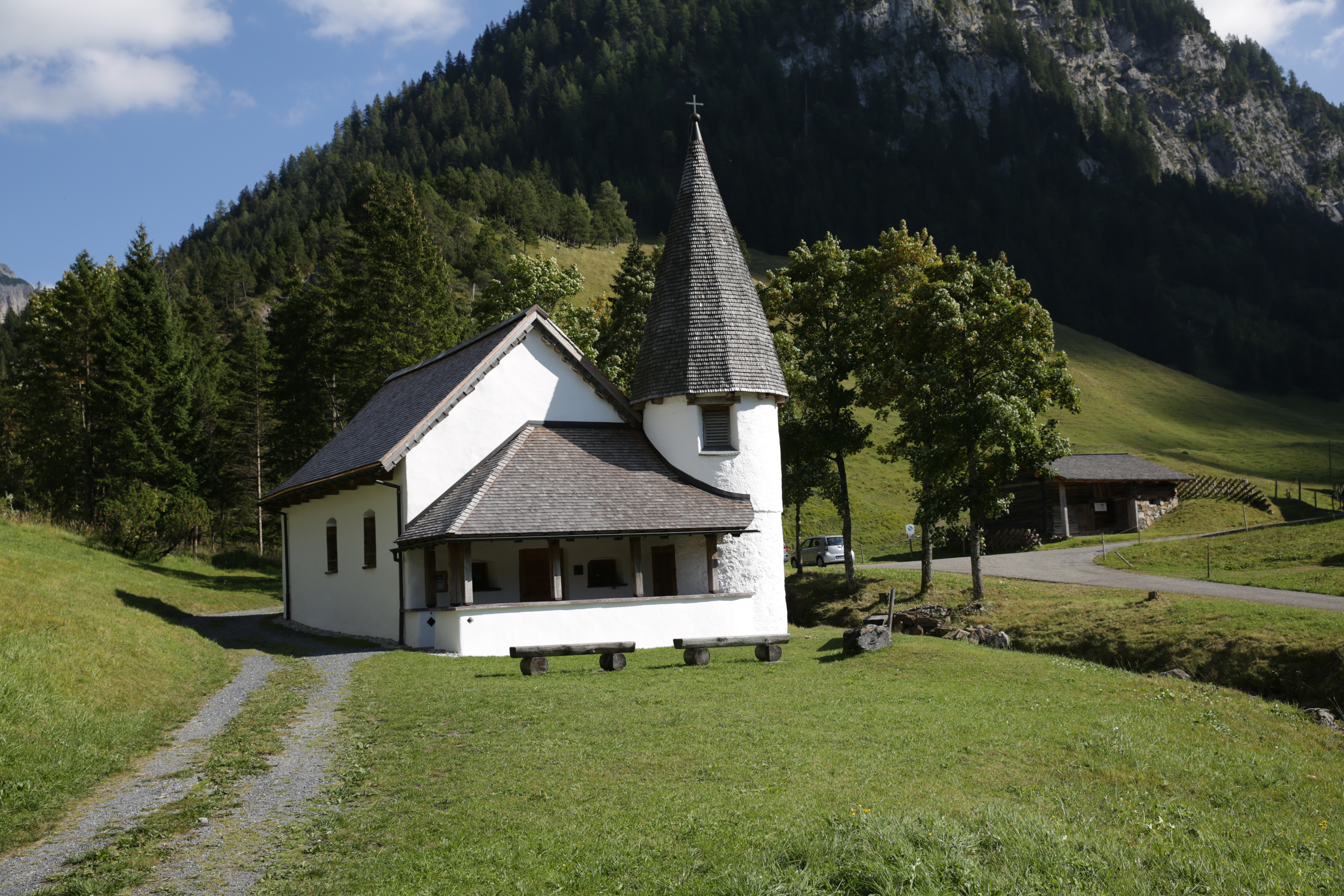
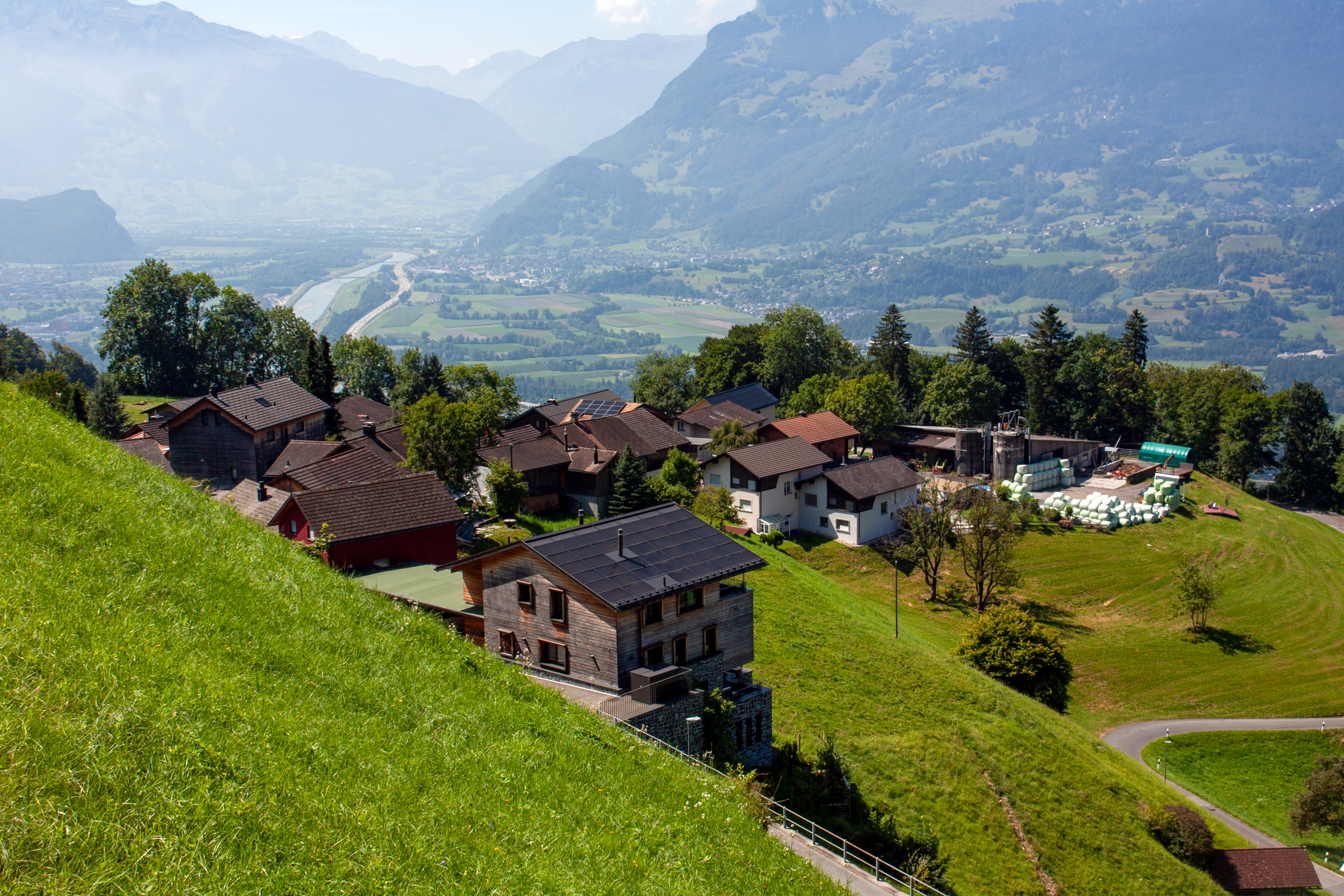
- Panoramic view Town hall & St Joseph Parish Church Malbun Chapel St. Wendelin & Martin in Steg Wangerberg

- Flag Coat of arms

- Triesenberg and its exclave in Liechtenstein
- Interactive map of Triesenberg
- Coordinates: 47°7′5″N 9°32′36″E
- Country: Liechtenstein
- Electoral district: Oberland
- Villages: Gaflei, Malbun, Masescha, Rotenboden, Silum, Steg, Sücka, Wangerberg

Government
  - Mayor: Christoph Beck (VU)

Area
  - Total: 29.69 km^{2} (11.46 sq mi)
- Elevation: 884 m (2,900 ft)

Population (31 December 2018)
  - Total: 2,636
  - Density: 88.78/km^{2} (229.9/sq mi)
- Time zone: UTC+1 (CET)
  - Summer (DST): CEST
- Postal code: 9497
- Area code: 7004
- ISO 3166 code: LI-10
- Website: www.triesenberg.li

Triesenberg (Swiss Standard German pronunciation: [ˈtriːzn̩ˌbɛrɡ]) is a municipality in Liechtenstein with a population of 2,636. Its area of 29.69 square kilometres (11.46 sq mi) makes it the largest municipality in Liechtenstein. The center of the municipality rests at an elevation of 884–1,000 metres (2,900–3,281 ft).

== History ==
Triesenberg was first mentioned in 1378 as "Trisnerberg" (and was called "Triesnerberg" until "Triesenberg" became the official spelling in the 20th century). Triesenberg is noted for its distinct dialect, dating from the influence of Walser migrants in the Middle Ages, who arrived in the region early in the 14th century. This dialect is actively promoted by the municipality. The existence of this dialect is one evidence of remarkable linguistic diversity within the small Principality, as it is spoken alongside the Standard German and Alemannic dialect common to the country.

== Politics ==
=== Last election ===
Party	Votes	%	Seats	+/–
Patriotic Union	7,271	54.88	5	0
Progressive Citizens' Party	5,240	39.55	5	+1
Free List	739	5.58	0	-1
Total	13,250	100.00	10	0
Valid votes	1,325	94.91		
Invalid votes	39	2.79		
Blank votes	32	2.29		
Total votes	1,396	100.00		
Registered voters/turnout	1,683	82.95		
Source: Gemeindewahlen

== Geography ==
The municipality includes eight villages: Gaflei, Malbun, Masescha, Rotenboden, Silum, Steg, Sücka and Wangerberg. Malbun is the only ski-resort village in the country, located not far from the border with Austria (Vorarlberg).

== Notable people ==
- Maria Foser, Deputy Government Councillor for Social Affairs
- Franz Schädler (1917–1941), alpine skier
- Gustav Schädler (1883 Triesenberg – 1961 in Vaduz), politician and a former Prime Minister of Liechtenstein
- Marco Schädler (born 1964 in Triesenberg) composer, he studied music at the conservatory in Feldkirch, Austria.
