= Municipalities of Liechtenstein =

Municipalities of Liechtenstein Die Gemeinden von Liechtenstein (German)
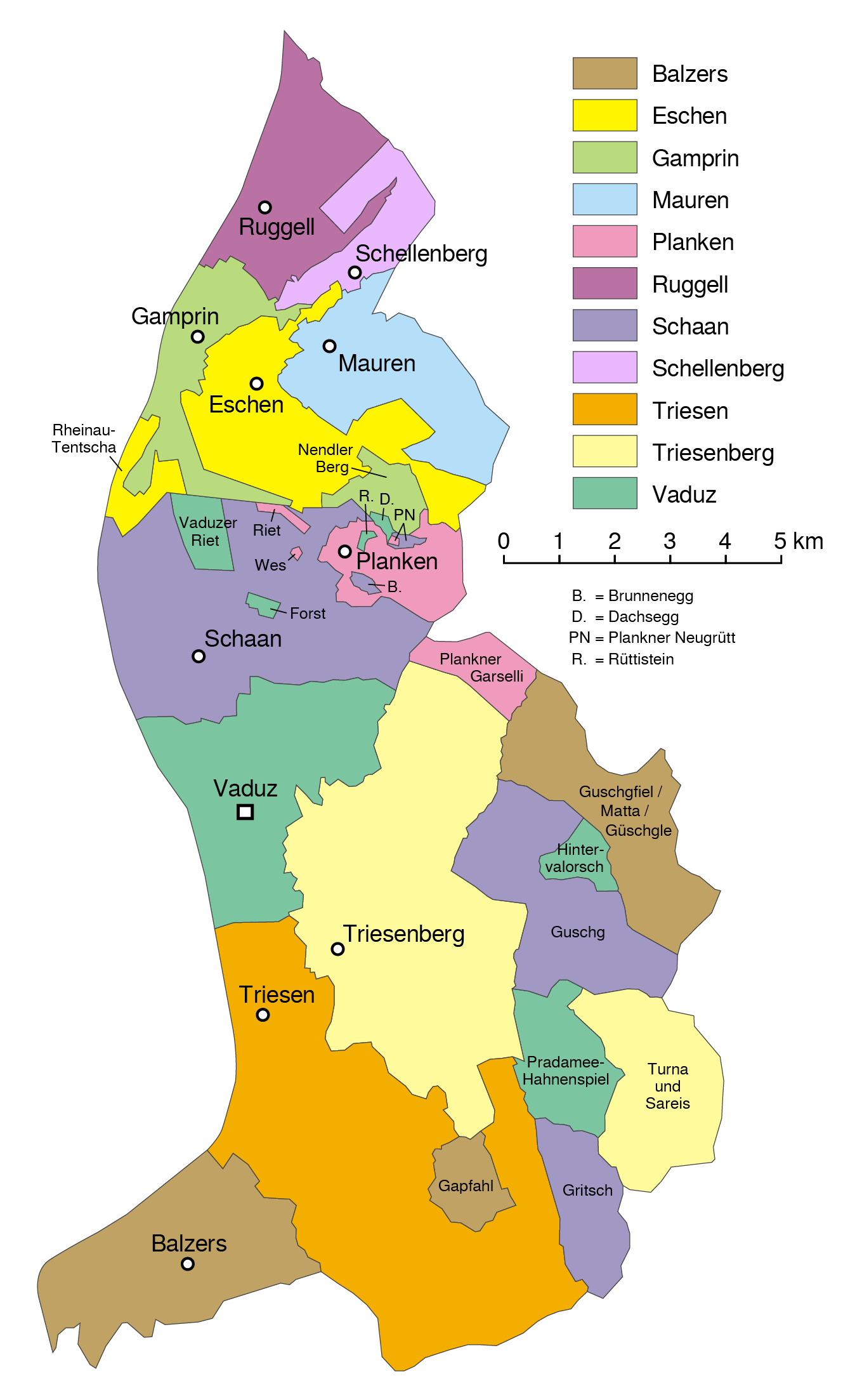
- Category: Unitary state
- Location: Principality of Liechtenstein
- Number: 11 municipalities
- Populations: 473 (Planken) – 6,039 (Schaan)
- Areas: 3.6 km^{2} (1.4 sq mi) (Schellenberg) – 30 km^{2} (11.5 sq mi) (Triesenberg)
- Government: Municipality government, Liechtenstein
- Subdivisions: Village

The principality of Liechtenstein is divided into eleven municipalities (German: Gemeinden, singular Gemeinde), most consisting of only a single town. Five of the Gemeinden fall within the electoral district of Unterland (lower country), while the other six are within the Oberland (upper country).

Since 2003, Liechtenstein's constitution has given individual municipalities the right to secede from the country. However, this has never been applied.

== Municipalities ==
Coat of arms	Flag	Name	Population (30 June 2024)	Area (km^{2})	Postal code	Towns/Villages
Electoral District of Unterland
Ruggell	Ruggell Liechtenstein-1	Ruggell	2,545	7.4	9491	Ruggell
Schellenberg	Schellenberg Liechtenstein-1	Schellenberg	1,151	3.5	9488	Schellenberg; Hinterschellenberg
Gamprin	Gamprin Liechtenstein-1	Gamprin	1,757	6.1	9487	Gamprin; Bendern
Eschen	Eschen Liechtenstein-1	Eschen	4,663	10.3	9492	Eschen; Nendeln
Mauren	Mauren Liechtenstein-1	Mauren	4,624	7.5	9493	Mauren; Schaanwald
Electoral District of Oberland
Schaan	Schaan Liechtenstein-1	Schaan	6,250	26.8	9494	Schaan
Planken	Planken Liechtenstein-1	Planken	492	5.3	9498	Planken
Vaduz	Vaduz Liechtenstein-1	Vaduz	6,002	17.3	9490	Vaduz; Ebenholz, Mühleholz
Triesenberg	Triesenberg Liechtenstein-1	Triesenberg	2,712	29.8	9497	Triesenberg; Gaflei, Malbun, Masescha, Rotenboden, Silum, Steg, Sücka, Wangerberg
Triesen	Triesen Liechtenstein-1	Triesen	5,688	26.4	9495	Triesen; Lawena, Valüna
Balzers	Balzers Liechtenstein-1	Balzers	4,803	19.6	9496	Balzers; Mäls
Liechtenstein		Liechtenstein	40,023	160.0		

== Exclaves and enclaves ==
The municipalities of Liechtenstein, the Gemeinden, exhibit complex shapes, despite their small size.

Seven of the Gemeinden have one or more exclaves, in addition to the main territory:

- Gamprin: 1 exclave
- Eschen: 1 exclave
- Planken: 4 exclaves, of which 1 is a true enclave
- Schaan: 4 exclaves, of which 1 is a true enclave
- Vaduz: 6 exclaves, of which 2 are true enclaves
- Triesenberg: 1 exclave
- Balzers: 2 exclaves

== Data codes ==
In ISO 3166-2, the codes of the municipalities start with LI-, followed by two digits (01–11, assigned in alphabetical order).

In FIPS 10-4 (standard withdrawn in 2008), the codes of the municipalities started with LS-, followed by the same two digits as the ISO codes.

As a member of the EFTA, Liechtenstein is included in the Nomenclature of Territorial Units for Statistics (NUTS). The three NUTS levels all correspond to the country itself (NUTS-1: LI0; NUTS-2: LI00; NUTS-3: LI000). Below the NUTS levels, there are two LAU levels (LAU-1: electoral districts; LAU-2: municipalities).

== See also ==
- ISO 3166-2:LI
