= Rhine Glacier =

Glacier in Switzerland

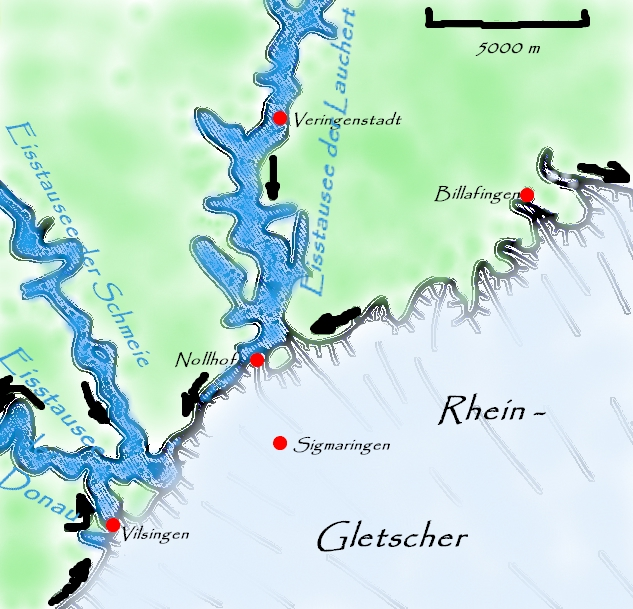
- Reconstruction of the front of the Rhine glacier near Sigmaringen showing blockage the Danube course during the Riss glaciation.

- Location within Alps
- Interactive map of Rhine Glacier
- Location: Bavaria top
- Coordinates: 48°05′12″N 9°12′59″E
- Status: melted

The Rhine Glacier was a glacier during the last glacial period and was responsible for the formation of the Lake Constance.
