= Telephone numbers in Liechtenstein =

- Country: Liechtenstein
- Continent: Europe
- Format: xxx xx xx
- Country code: +423 (formerly: +41 75)
- International access: 00
- Long-distance: None

Liechtenstein previously used the Swiss telephone numbering plan (+41) under area code 075. (This was dialled as +41 75 from outside Switzerland and Liechtenstein). However, on 5 April 1999, it adopted its own international code +423. Consequently, calls from Switzerland now require international dialling, using the 00423 prefix and the seven-digit number.

Liechtenstein Numbering Plan (ITU-T E.164)
Leading digit(s)	Number of digits	Services
1	3–4	Access codes
2	7	Fixed-line services
3	7	Fixed-line services
4	7	reserved
5	9	reserved
60–68	9	International mobile services
69	9	Voicemail services for national mobile services
7	7	National mobile services
80	7	Special services: Free services
81–83	7	Special services (reserved)
84	7	Special services: Split-cost services
85–86	7	Special services (reserved)
87	7	Special services: Fixed-cost services
88	7	Special services (reserved)
89	7	Special services: Personal number services
900	7	Premium services: Business, marketing
901	7	Premium services: Entertainment, games, callback
902–905	7	Premium services (reserved)
906	7	Premium services: Adult entertainment
907–999	7	Premium services (reserved)

Liechtenstein Numbering Plan (ITU-T E.164)
