= Bermann =

Bermann may refer to:

- Evelyne Bermann (born 1950), Swiss-born Liechtenstein artist
- George Bermann (born 1945), American lawyer and scholar of international law
- Gregorio Bermann (1894–1972), Argentine psychiatrist, philosopher, activist, author, and humanist
- Herb Bermann, American lyricist, screenwriter, and actor
- Sandra Bermann, American literary scholar
- Sylvia Bermann (1922–2012), Argentine psychiatrist, public health specialist, essayist, and Montonero; daughter of Gregorio Bermann
- Sylvie Bermann (born 1953), French career diplomat
- Gottfried Bermann Fischer (1897–1995), German publisher
