= Vaduz =

Capital of Liechtenstein

- Capital city and municipality
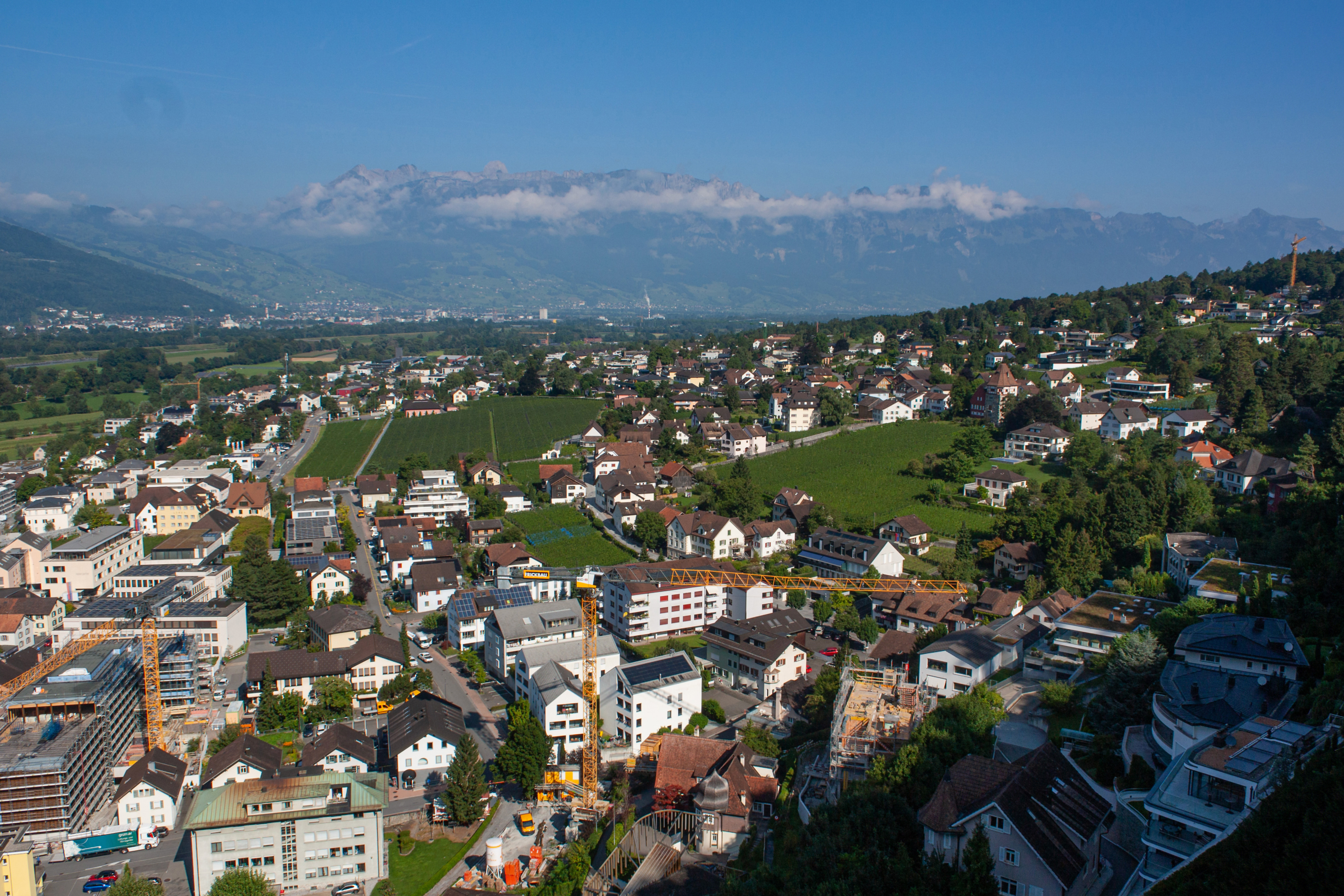
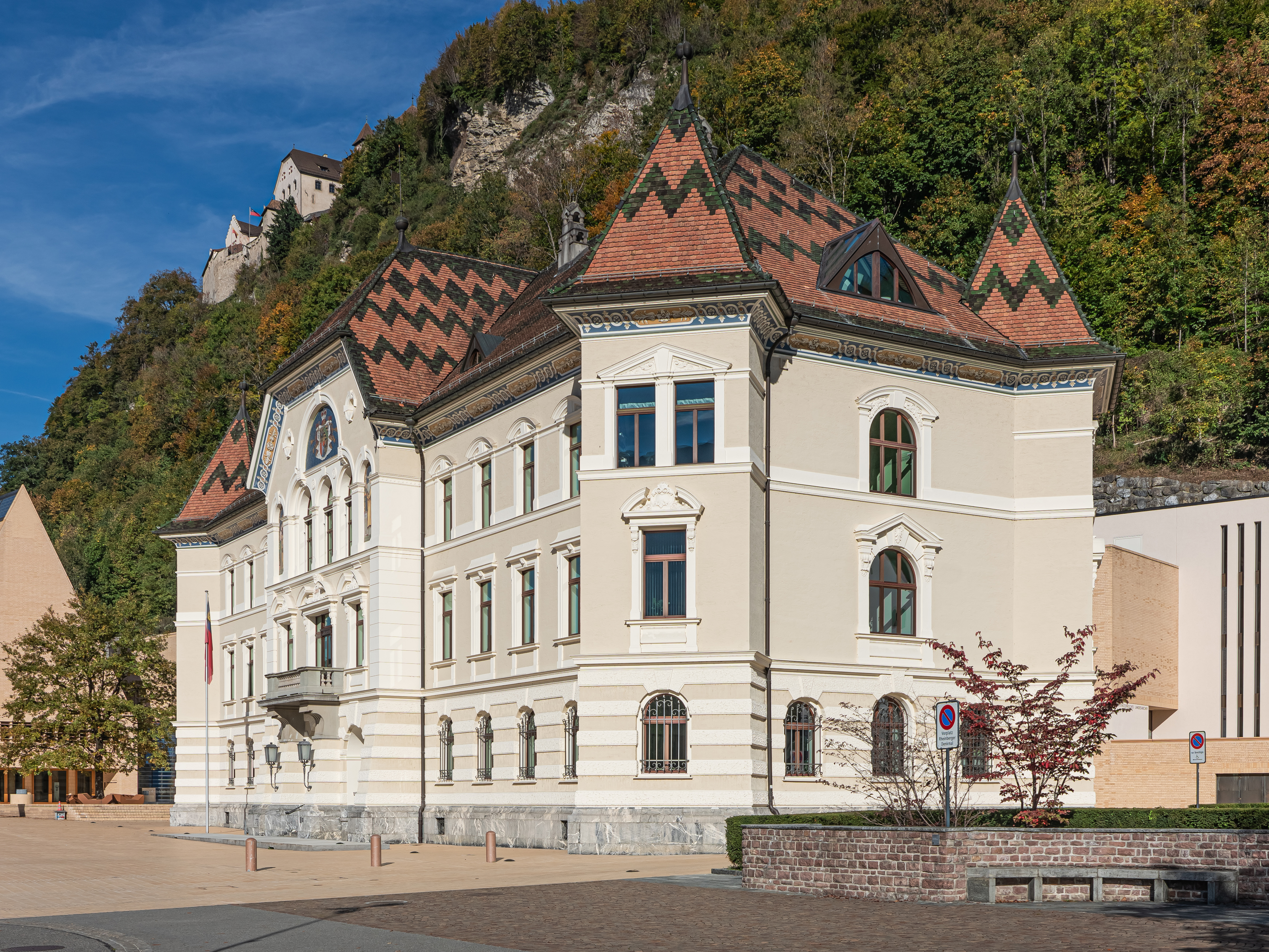
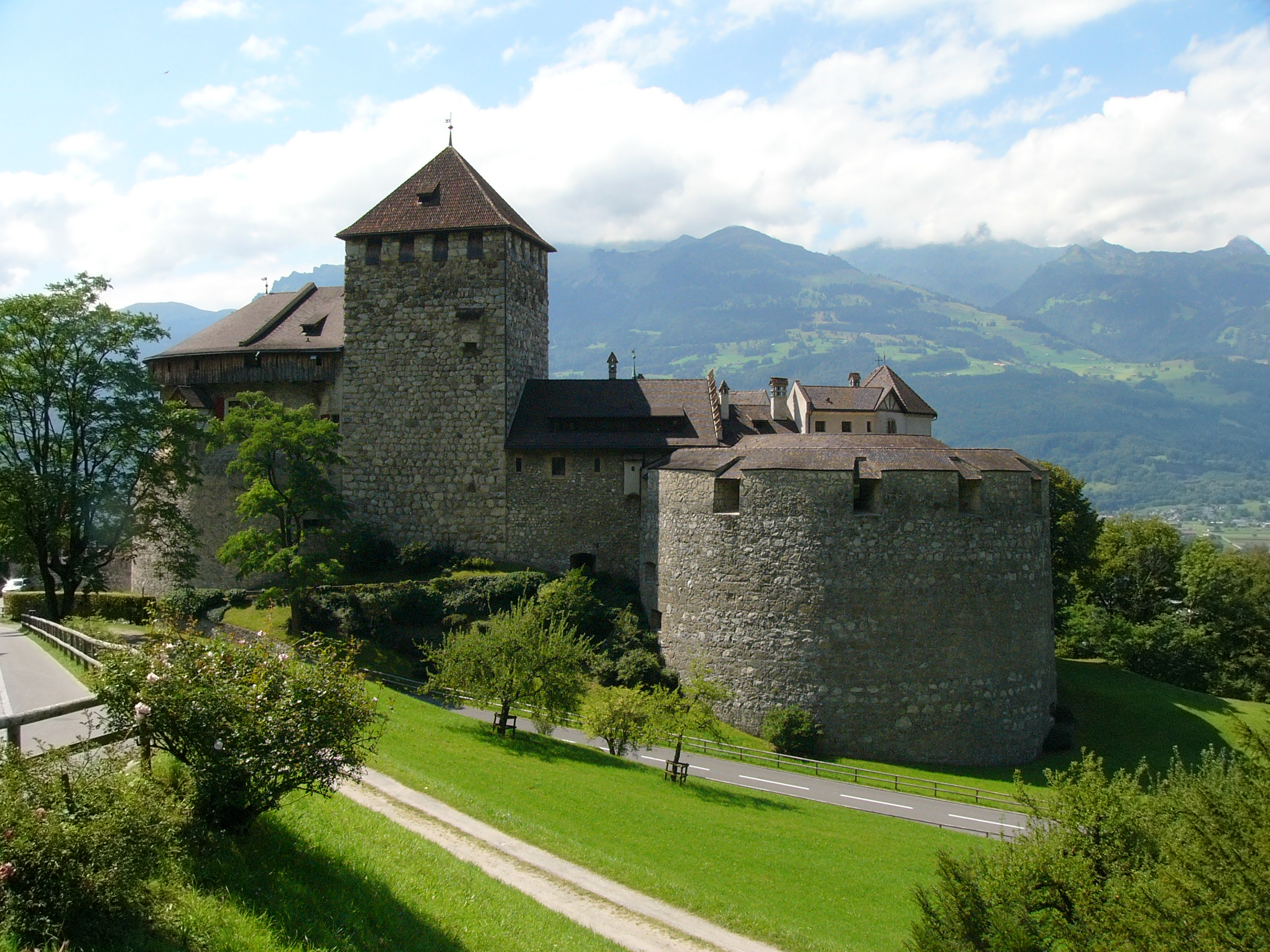
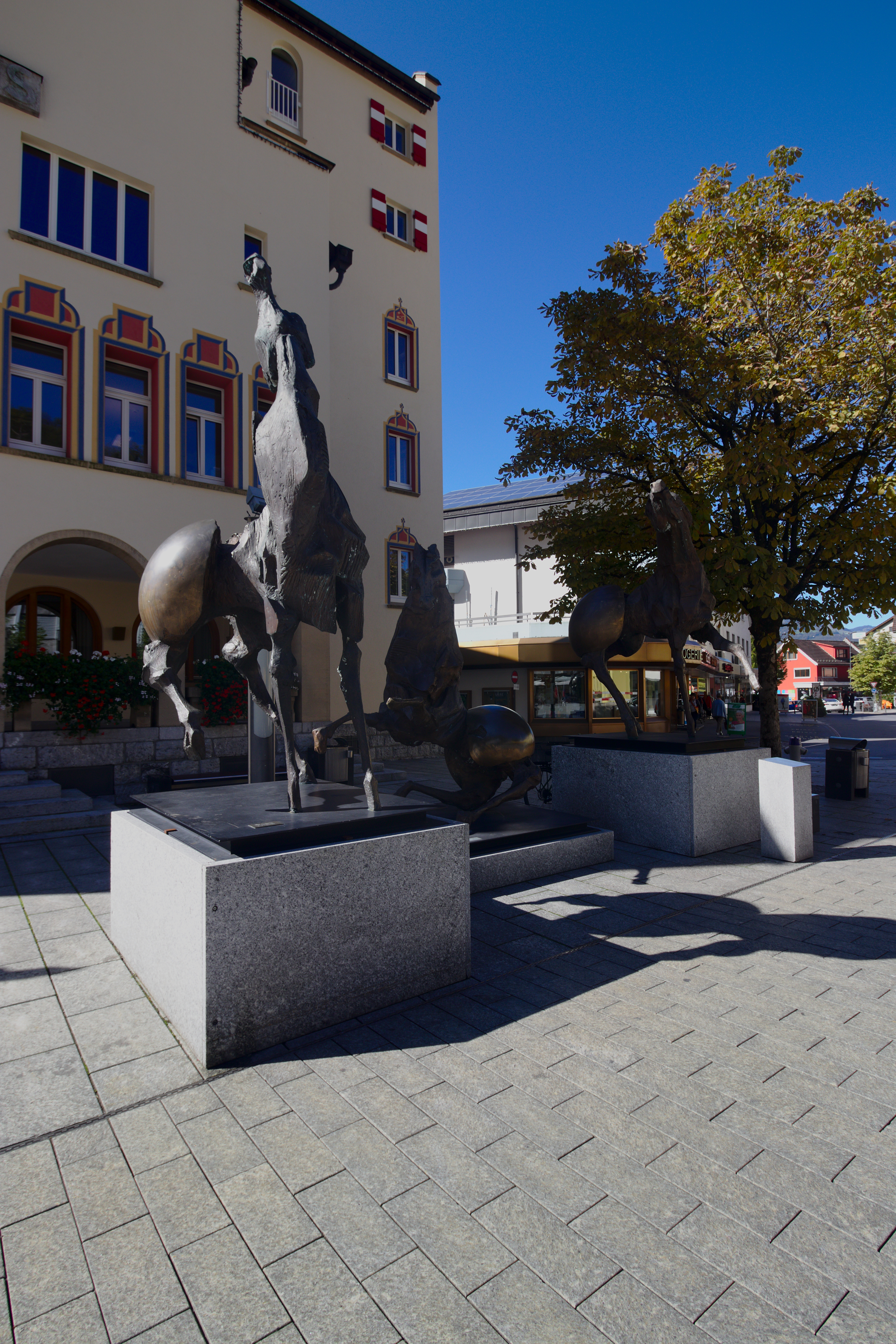
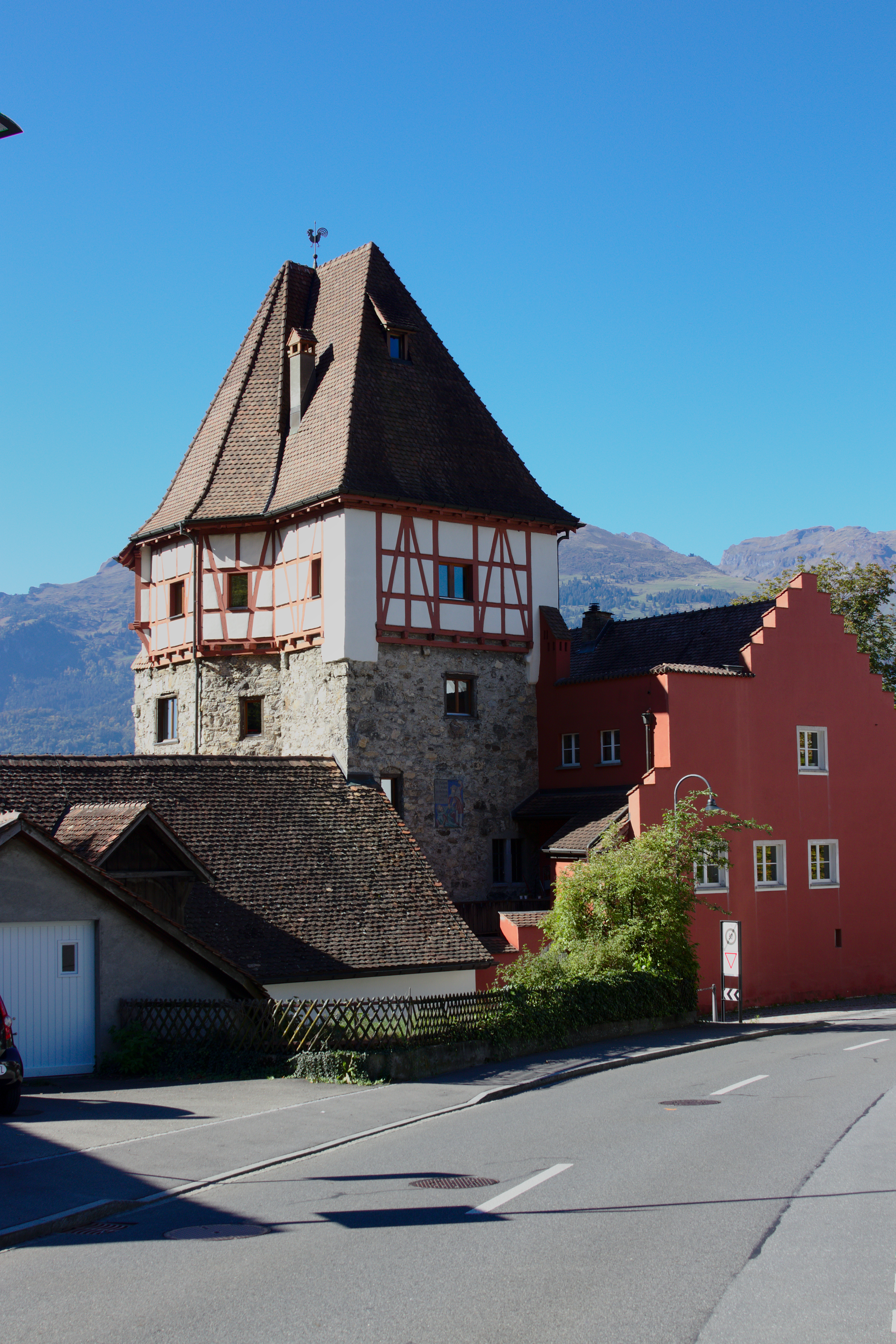
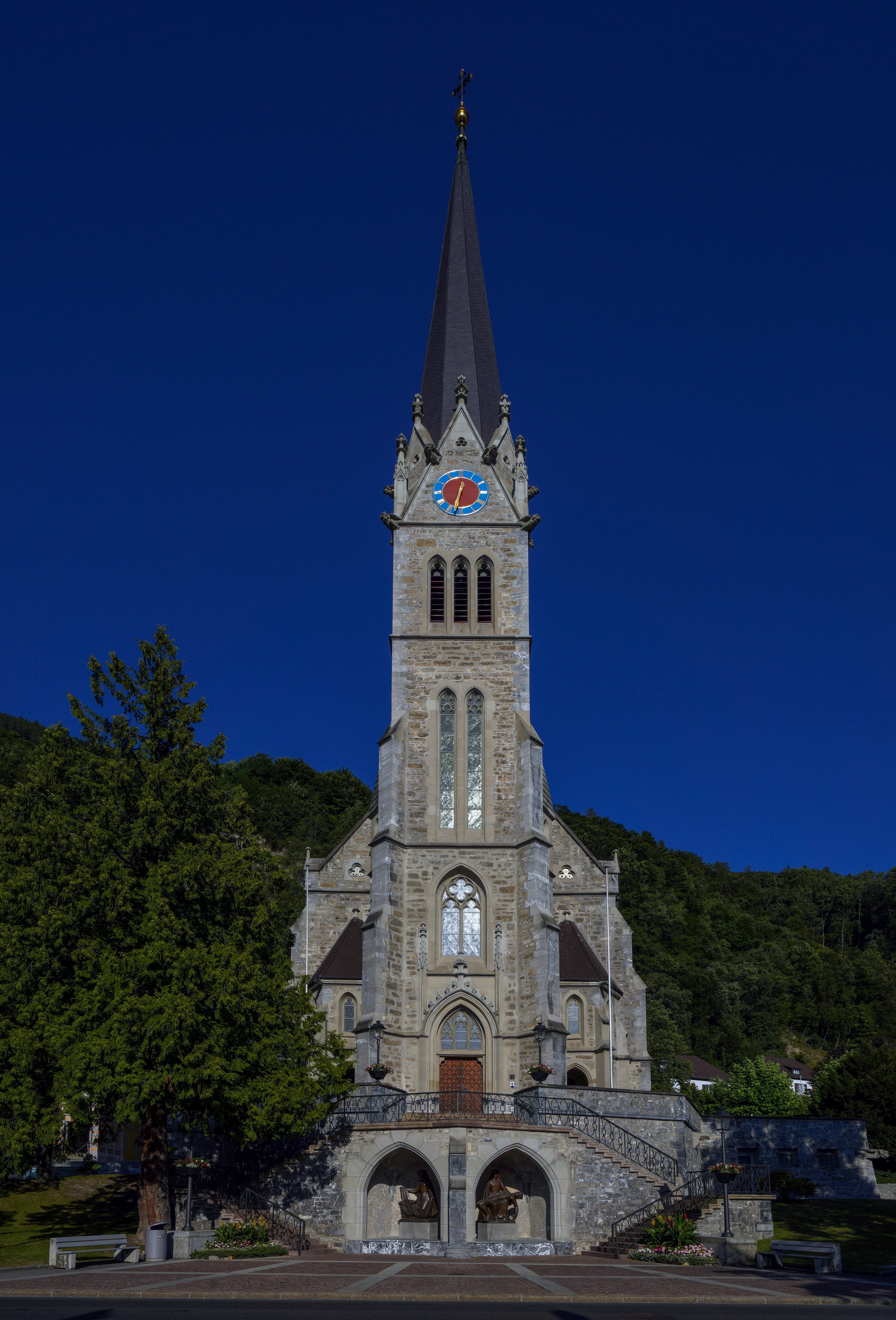
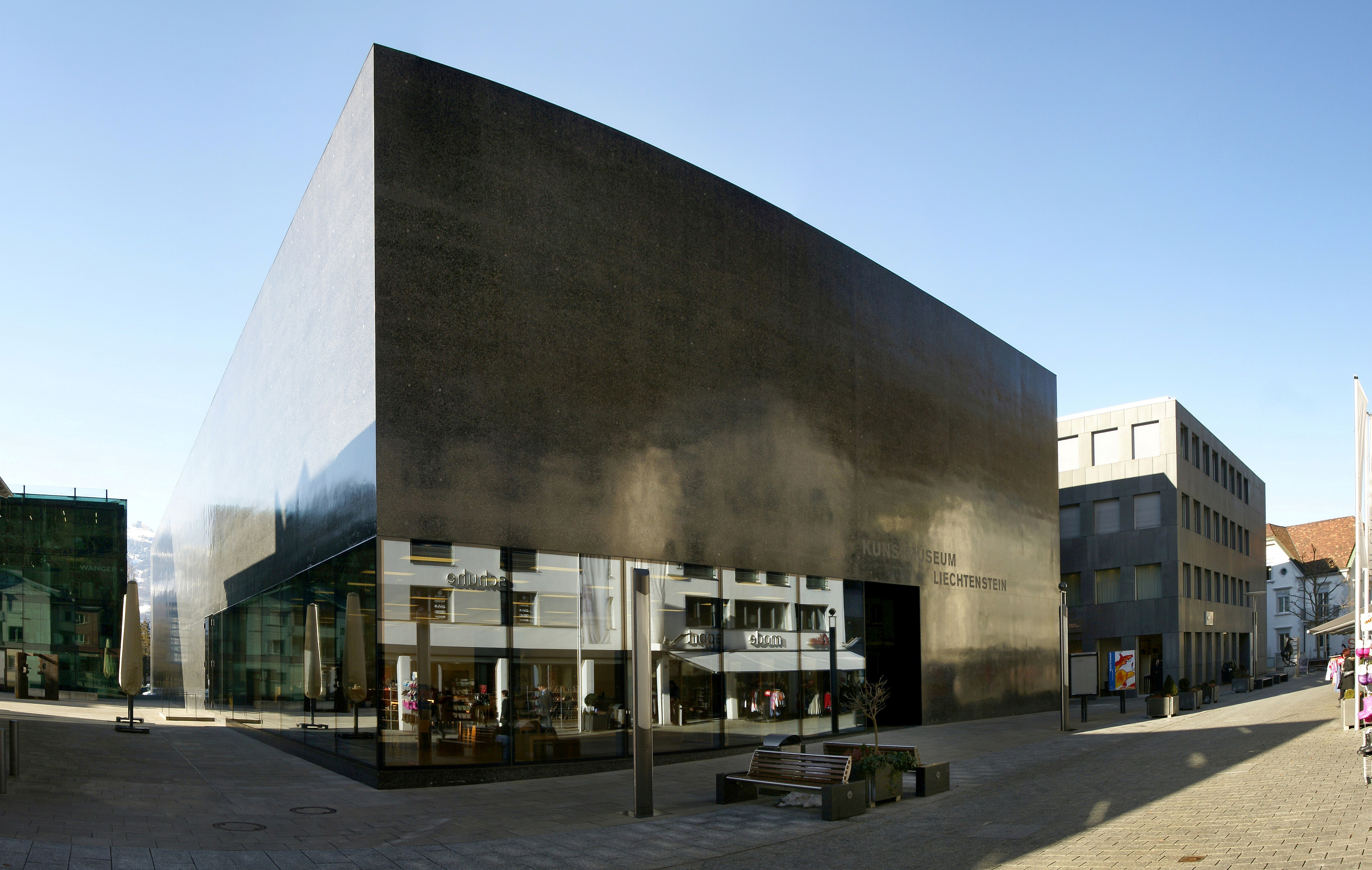
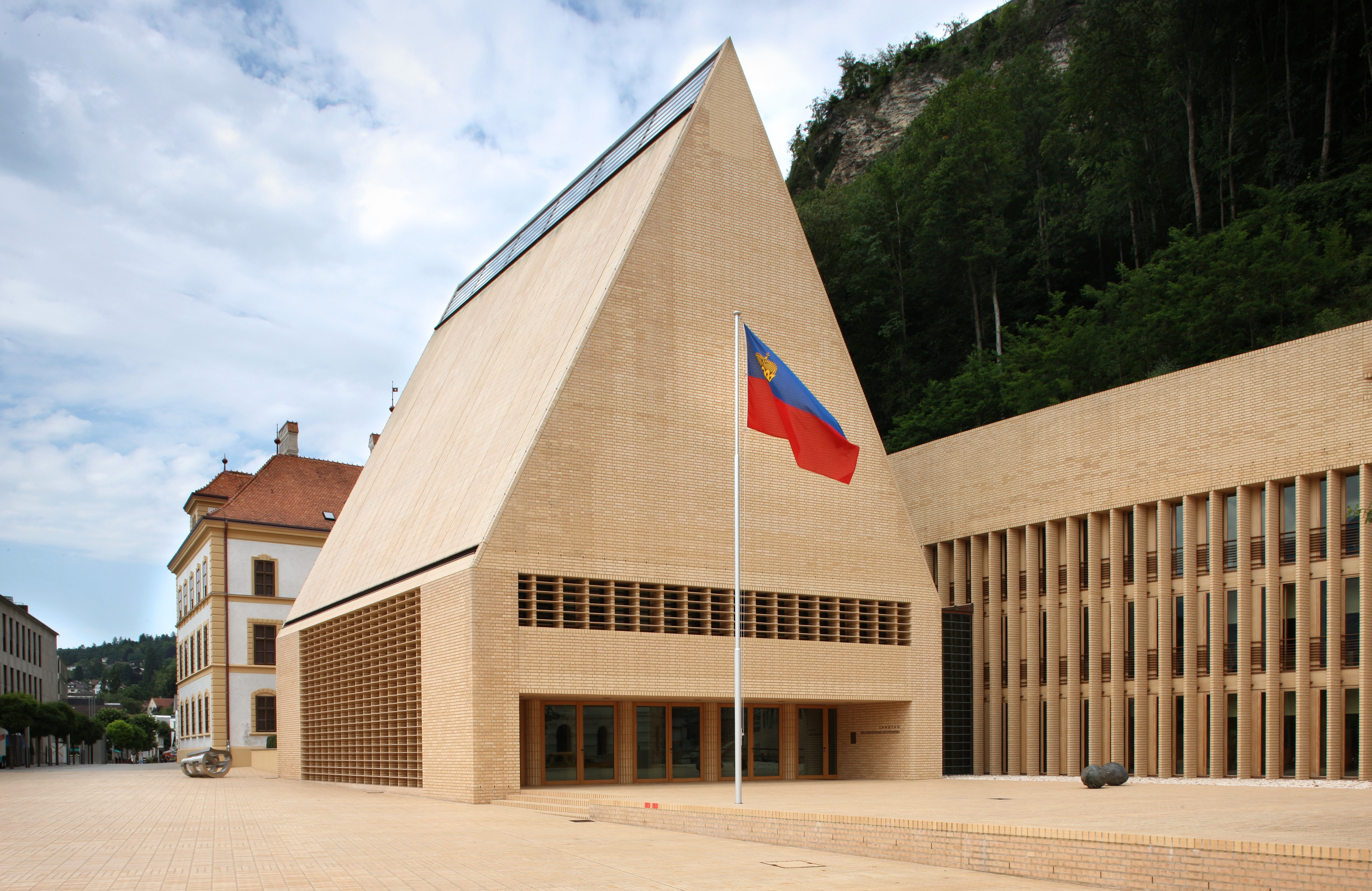
- Panoramic view Government building Vaduz Castle Tre Cavalli Rotes Haus Vaduz Cathedral Kunstmuseum Liechtenstein Landtag of Liechtenstein

- Flag Coat of arms

- Vaduz and its exclaves in Liechtenstein
- Interactive map of Vaduz
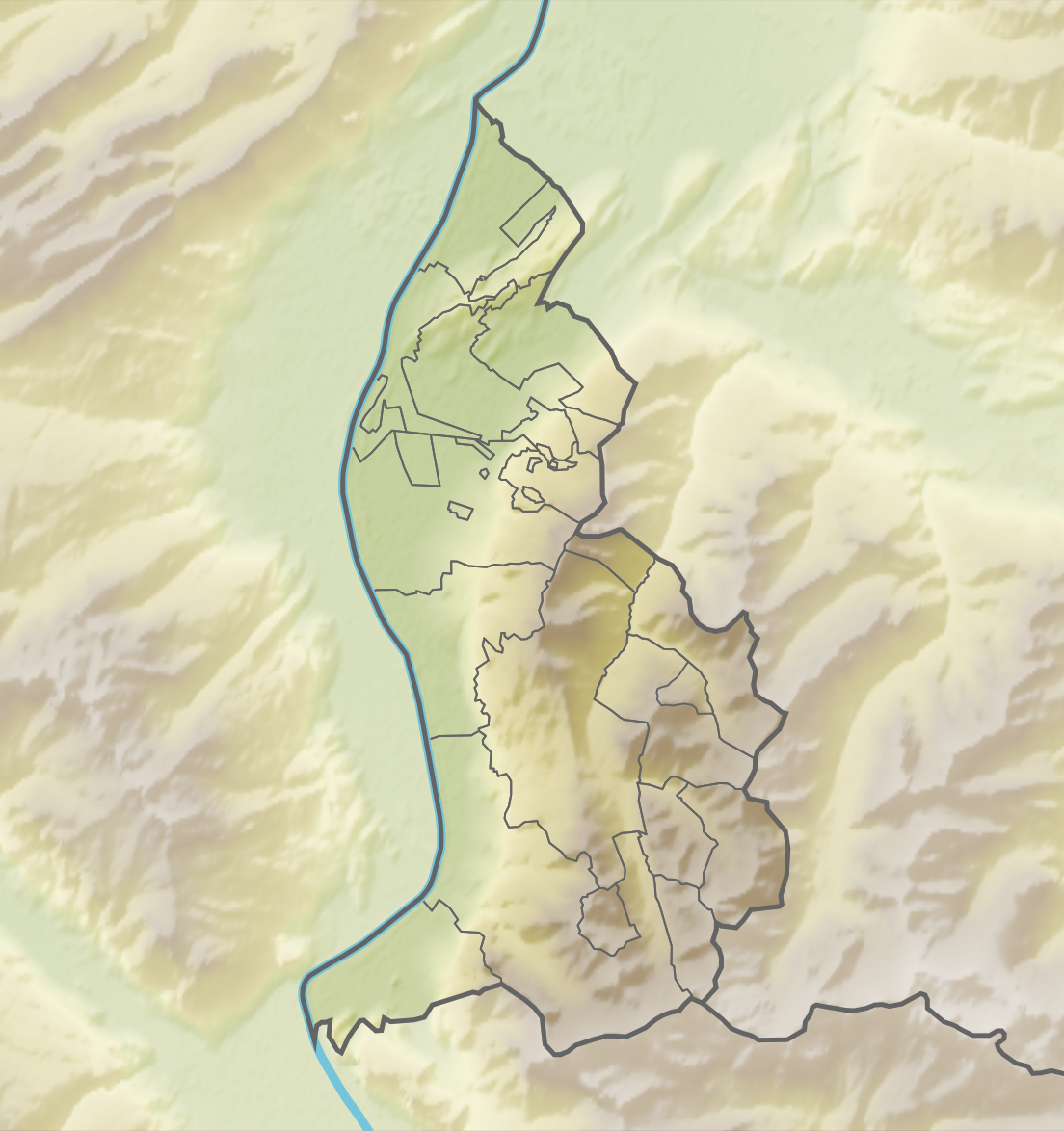
- Location within Liechtenstein Location within Europe
- Coordinates: 47°08′26″N 9°31′20″E
- Country: Liechtenstein
- Electoral district: Oberland
- Villages: Ebenholz, Mühleholz

Government
  - Mayor: Florian Meier (FBP)

Area
  - Total: 17.28 km^{2} (6.67 sq mi)
- Elevation: 455 m (1,493 ft)

Population (31 December 2019)
  - Total: 5,696
  - Density: 329.6/km^{2} (853.7/sq mi)
- Demonym: Vaduzer (German)
- Time zone: UTC+01:00 (CET)
  - Summer (DST): UTC+02:00 (CEST)
- Postal code: 9490
- Area code: 7001
- ISO 3166 code: LI-11
- Website: www.vaduz.li

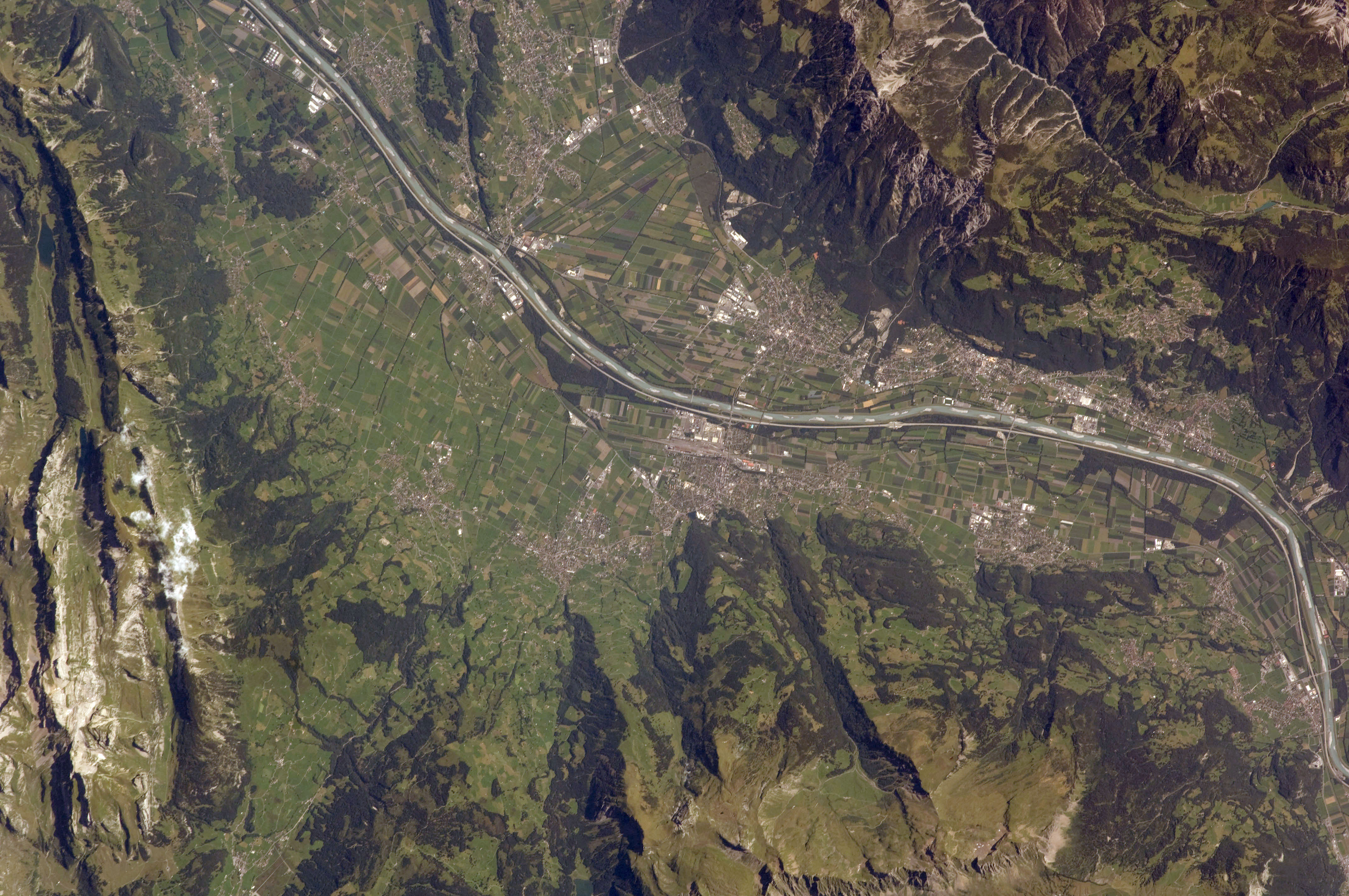
View of Vaduz from space

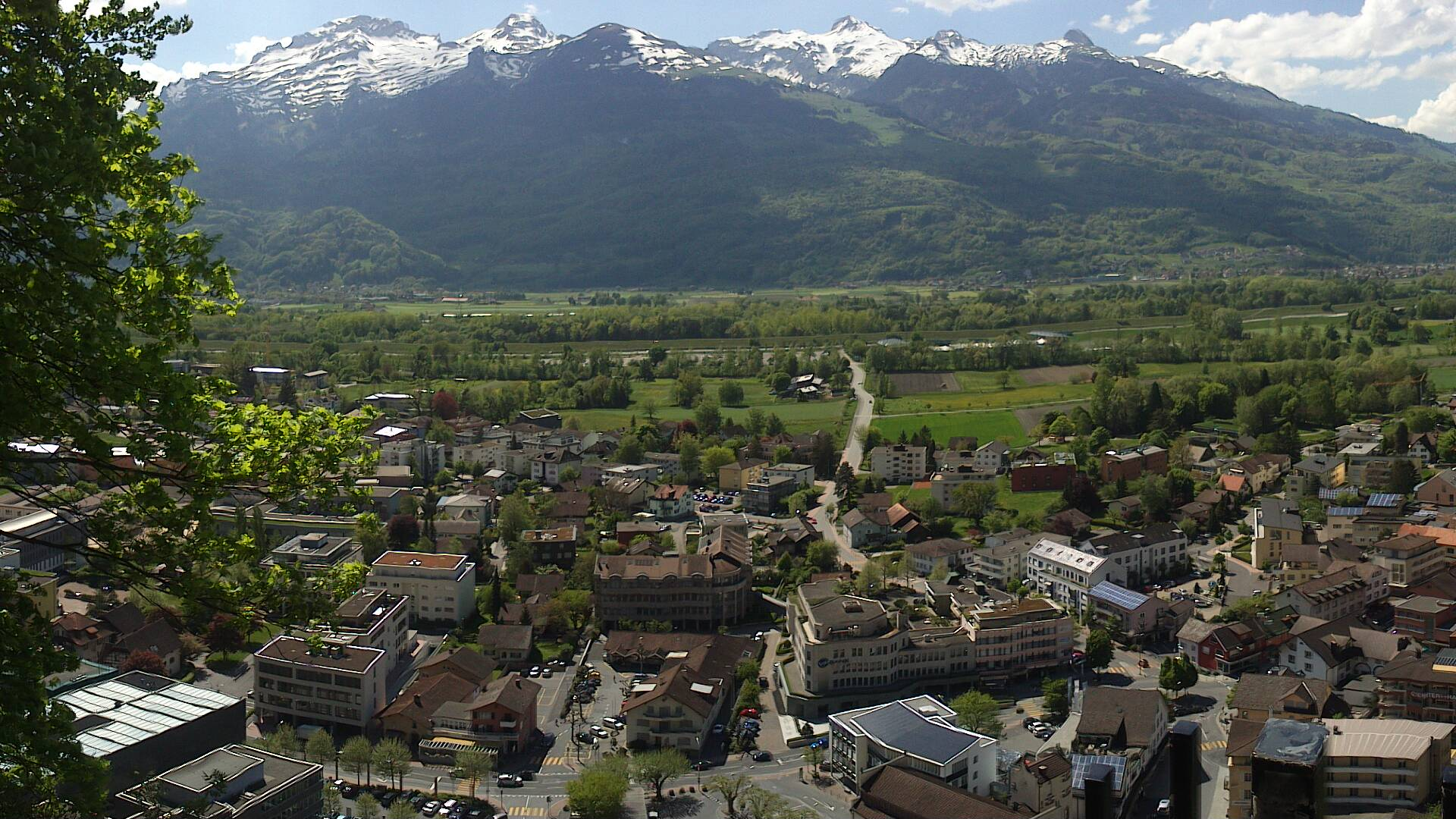
Panoramic view of Vaduz

Vaduz (/fɑːˈduːts/; German: [faˈduts]; High Alemannic: [faˈdot͡s]) is the capital of Liechtenstein and also the seat of the national parliament. The town, which is located along the Rhine, has 5,696 residents. The most prominent landmark of Vaduz is Vaduz Castle, perched atop a steep hill overlooking the town. It is home to the reigning prince of Liechtenstein and the Liechtenstein princely family. The town's distinctive architecture is also displayed in landmarks such as the Cathedral of St. Florin, Government House, Town Hall, the National Art Gallery, as well as the National Museum. Although Vaduz is the best-known town in the principality internationally, it is not the largest; neighbouring Schaan has a larger population.

== Etymology ==
The name Vaduz had been first recorded as de Faduzes. The name of the settlement, like most other towns in the Rhine Valley region, is of Romance origin. The name can be traced back to Old Rhaeto-Romance root auadutg 'aqueduct', which in turn evolved from the Latin aquaeductus.

== History ==
Vaduz is mentioned in historic 12th-century manuscripts as Faduzes. In 1322 a mention of the castle is made, which was sacked by the Swiss in 1499 during the Swabian War. The entire village was also destroyed.

In the 17th century the Liechtenstein family was seeking a seat in the Imperial diet, the Reichstag. As they did not hold any territory that was directly under the Imperial throne they were unable to meet the primary requirement to qualify.

The family yearned for the added power a seat in the Imperial government would bring, and therefore sought to acquire lands that would be reichsunmittelbar, or held directly from the Holy Roman Emperor himself, without any intermediate feudal patronage. After some time, the family was able to arrange the purchase of the minuscule Herrschaft ("Lordship") of Schellenberg and the countship of Vaduz (in 1699 and 1712, respectively) from the Hohenems. Tiny Schellenberg and Vaduz possessed exactly the political status required: no feudal lord other than the Emperor.

Thereby, on 23 January 1719, after the purchase had been duly made, Charles VI, Holy Roman Emperor, decreed Vaduz and Schellenberg were united, and raised to the dignity of Fürstentum (principality) with the name "Liechtenstein" in honour of "[his] true servant, Anton Florian of Liechtenstein". It is on this date that Liechtenstein became a sovereign member state of the Holy Roman Empire. As testimony to the pure political expediency of the purchases, the Princes of Liechtenstein did not set foot in their new principality for over 120 years.

== Politics ==
Vaduz is located in the Oberland electoral district, which has fifteen seats in the Landtag of Liechtenstein. Since the introduction of Liechtenstein municipal law of 1864, Vaduz has been locally administered by a mayor and municipal council. Until 1941, this consisted of the mayor, the municipal treasurer, and seven other councillors.

In 1974, the municipal law was revised which extended the term of the mayor and council to four years and increased the seats of Vaduz's municipal council to twelve. The system to elect the municipal council was changed to use an open list proportional representation system. In 1976, Vaduz replaced universal male suffrage with universal suffrage. Universal suffrage was not introduced to Liechtenstein on a national level until 1984.

The incumbent mayor is Florian Meier, elected in the 2024 Vaduz mayoral by-election.

=== Last election ===
Party	Votes	%	Seats	+/–
Progressive Citizens' Party	9,522	41.35	6	+1
Patriotic Union	9,500	41.25	5	–1
Democrats for Liechtenstein	2,286	9.93	1	+1
Free List	1,720	7.47	1	–1
Total	23,028	100.00	13	0
Valid votes	1,919	95.19		
Invalid votes	70	3.47		
Blank votes	27	1.34		
Total votes	2,016	100.00		
Registered voters/turnout	2,835	71.11		
Source: Gemeindewahlen

== Geography ==
=== Climate ===
Vaduz features an oceanic climate with warm summers and chilly winters. Köppen-Geiger climate classification system classifies its climate as Marine West Coast Climate (Cfb). The village experiences a noticeable increase in precipitation during the summer, but in general all twelve months see some precipitation. Vaduz receives, on average, approximately 900 mm (35 in) of precipitation per year.

Vaduz's warmest month, July, sees average high temperatures reach 25 °C (77 °F) while average low temperatures are about 14 °C (57 °F). The village's coldest month, January, sees average highs of 3 °C (37 °F) and average lows of −3 °C (27 °F).

Climate data for Vaduz, elevation 457 m (1,499 ft), (1991–2020 normals, extremes 1973–present)
Month	Jan	Feb	Mar	Apr	May	Jun	Jul	Aug	Sep	Oct	Nov	Dec	Year
Record high °C (°F)	20.0 (68.0)	21.7 (71.1)	24.6 (76.3)	28.7 (83.7)	33.2 (91.8)	35.2 (95.4)	35.8 (96.4)	36.0 (96.8)	33.0 (91.4)	29.0 (84.2)	23.6 (74.5)	22.2 (72.0)	36.0 (96.8)
Mean daily maximum °C (°F)	5.0 (41.0)	6.8 (44.2)	11.8 (53.2)	16.0 (60.8)	20.1 (68.2)	23.2 (73.8)	24.9 (76.8)	24.3 (75.7)	20.0 (68.0)	15.7 (60.3)	9.5 (49.1)	5.5 (41.9)	15.2 (59.4)
Daily mean °C (°F)	1.4 (34.5)	2.7 (36.9)	6.8 (44.2)	10.7 (51.3)	14.7 (58.5)	17.9 (64.2)	19.4 (66.9)	19.1 (66.4)	15.0 (59.0)	11.1 (52.0)	5.7 (42.3)	2.2 (36.0)	10.6 (51.1)
Mean daily minimum °C (°F)	−2.0 (28.4)	−1.1 (30.0)	2.3 (36.1)	5.6 (42.1)	9.7 (49.5)	13.0 (55.4)	14.6 (58.3)	14.6 (58.3)	10.8 (51.4)	6.9 (44.4)	2.2 (36.0)	−1.1 (30.0)	6.3 (43.3)
Record low °C (°F)	−20.3 (−4.5)	−17.2 (1.0)	−12.9 (8.8)	−5.0 (23.0)	−1.0 (30.2)	3.4 (38.1)	5.0 (41.0)	5.0 (41.0)	0.0 (32.0)	−5.3 (22.5)	−11.2 (11.8)	−16.0 (3.2)	−20.3 (−4.5)
Average precipitation mm (inches)	41.1 (1.62)	33.8 (1.33)	54.4 (2.14)	56.7 (2.23)	90.2 (3.55)	116.4 (4.58)	130.3 (5.13)	144.4 (5.69)	95.8 (3.77)	67.7 (2.67)	55.7 (2.19)	53.6 (2.11)	940.1 (37.01)
Average snowfall cm (inches)	14.2 (5.6)	14.4 (5.7)	6.4 (2.5)	0.4 (0.2)	0 (0)	0 (0)	0 (0)	0 (0)	0 (0)	0 (0)	4.7 (1.9)	11.9 (4.7)	52.0 (20.5)
Average precipitation days (≥ 1 mm)	7.4	6.6	9.0	8.9	11.8	12.9	13.2	13.3	10.1	8.7	8.7	8.7	119.3
Average snowy days	3.9	3.9	2.1	0.2	0.0	0.0	0.0	0.0	0.0	0.0	1.4	3.3	14.8
Average relative humidity (%)	75	69	66	63	67	70	71	74	76	76	77	77	72
Mean monthly sunshine hours	71.9	91.6	130.6	156.4	168.2	181.0	197.0	182.8	147.0	114.3	67.5	55.3	1,563.6
Percentage possible sunshine	40	44	47	49	46	48	52	54	52	48	36	34	47
Source 1: NOAA
Source 2: MeteoSwiss (snow 1981–2010)

== Main sights ==
Vaduz Castle is the home of the reigning prince of Liechtenstein and the Liechtenstein princely family. The castle is visible from almost any location in Vaduz, being perched atop a steep hill in the middle of the town. The Cathedral of St. Florin, Government House and Village Hall display the various styles and periods of architecture in the town. Schalun Castle is located in the municipality, to the northeast of Vaduz.

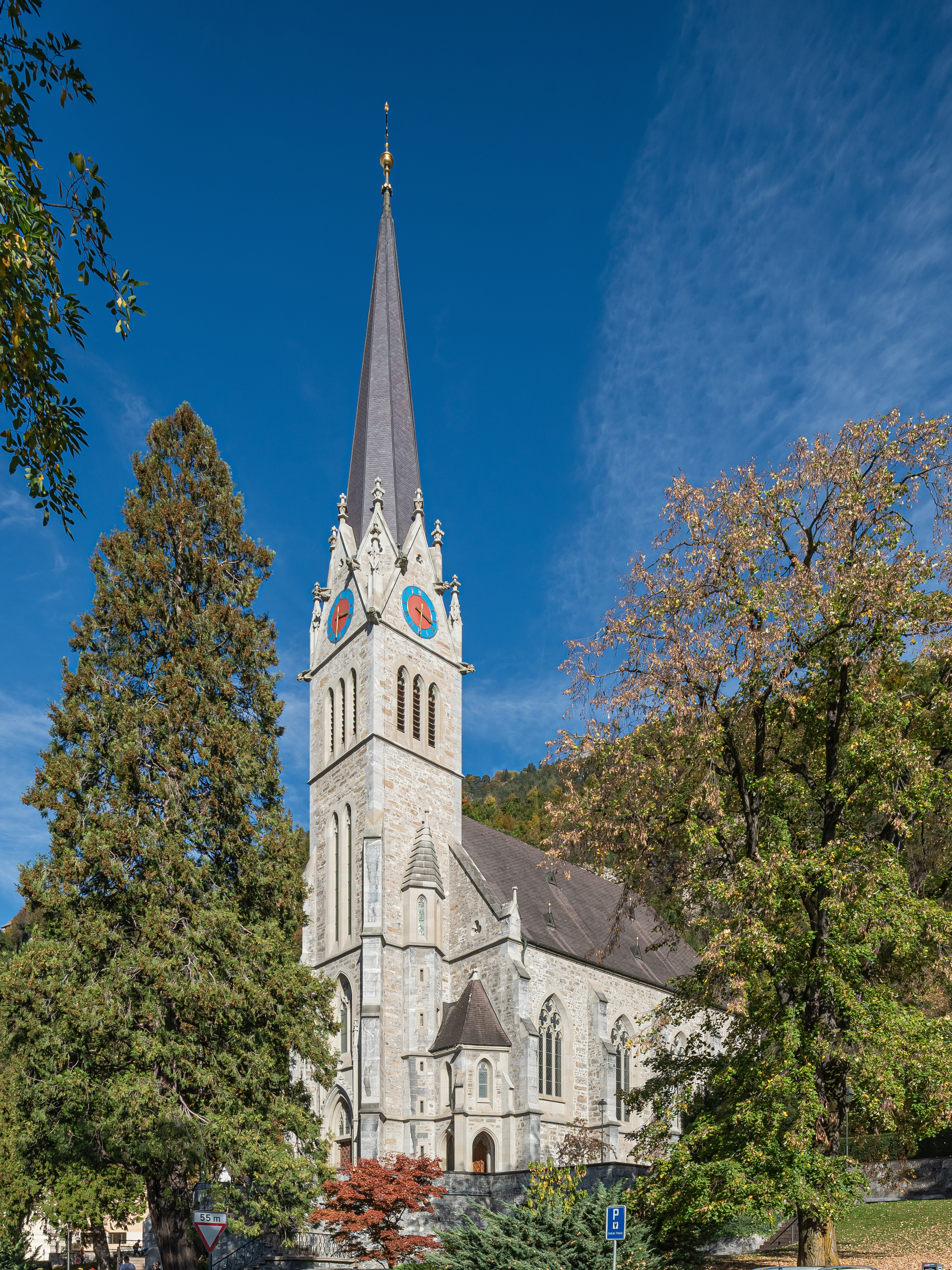
Cathedral of St. Florin

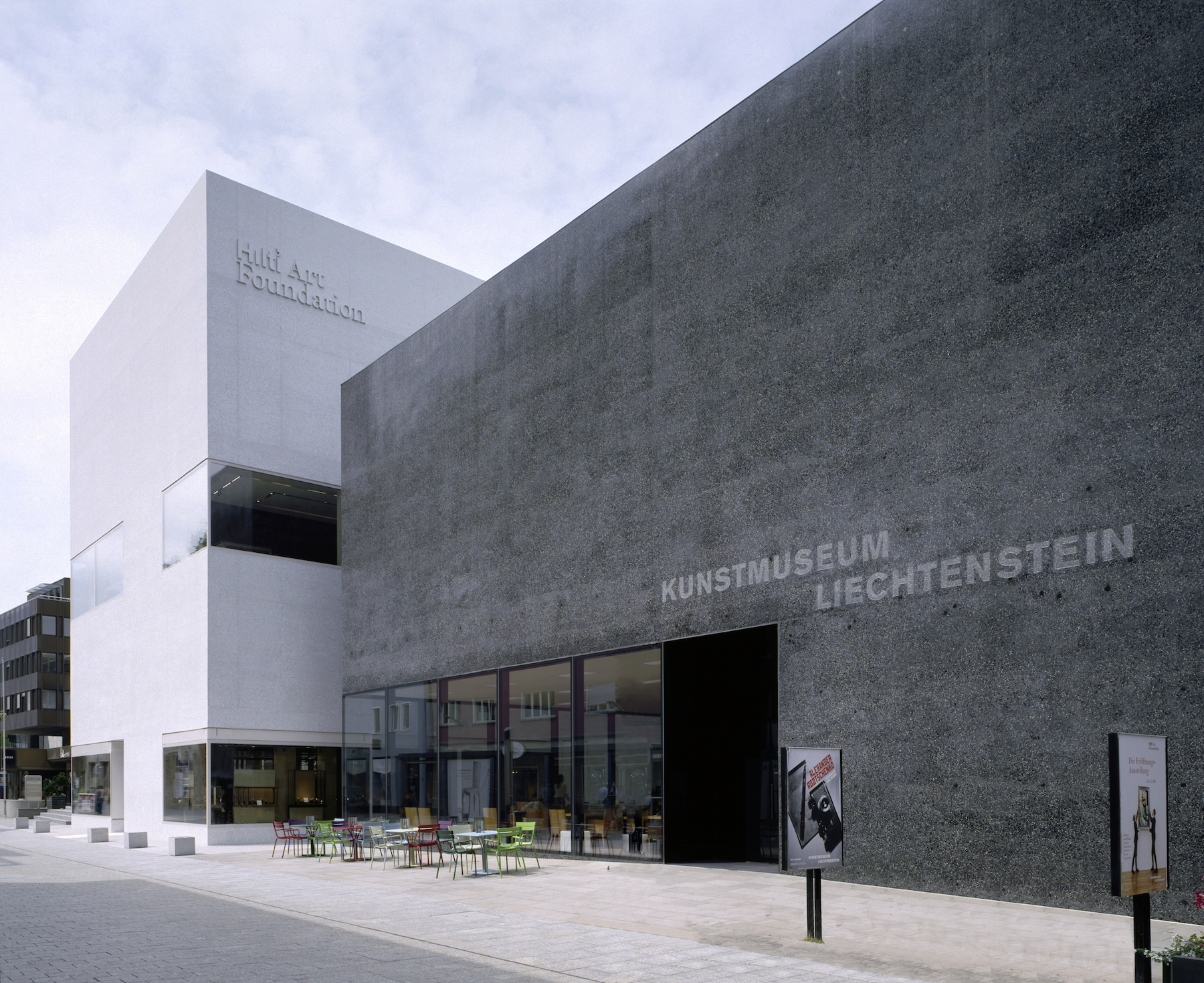
Kunstmuseum Liechtenstein

== Demographics ==
As of 2019, 5,696 people lived in Vaduz. Foreigners resident in the town make up 42% of the population. With 67% the population is predominantly Roman Catholic, while the percentage of Catholics is significantly higher among residents with Liechtenstein nationality (81%) than among foreigner residents (47%). The largest minority religions in the town are Protestantism (10%) and Islam (8%).

Religion in Vaduz - 2015
religion	percent
Roman Catholicism	67%
Protestantism	10%
Other Christians	3%
Islam	8%
Others/undeclared	4%
Non-religious	9%
Note: Percentage is more than 100 due to rounding.

== Culture ==
The National Art Gallery as well as the National Museum are located in Vaduz. The art gallery (Kunstmuseum Liechtenstein) is a museum of modern and contemporary art, and also shows displays from the private princely Liechtenstein Collection, the main public display of which is in Vienna. The building is an architectural landmark built by the Swiss architects Morger, Degelo and Kerez. It was completed in November 2000 and forms a "black box" of tinted concrete and black basalt stone. The museum collection is also the national art collection of Liechtenstein. The Liechtenstein National Museum is showing a permanent exhibition on the cultural and natural history of Liechtenstein as well as special exhibitions. There are also the Postage Stamp Museum and a Ski Museum. Vaduz has a kind of folksong that has been greatly influenced by Switzerland, known as Köpugeäng.

== Economy and transport ==
Vaduz is one of the few capital cities in the world to not have an airport. The closest major airport is Zurich Airport; smaller airports in St. Gallen-Altenrhein and Friedrichshafen also provide access to Vaduz. By car, Vaduz is directly accessible via the A13 motorway in Switzerland, or via the A14 motorway in Austria. Vaduz is connected to Switzerland over the Rhine river by the Vaduz–Sevelen footbridge, or the Werdenberger-Binnenkanal bridge for motor vehicles, which was opened in 1975. Buses can be taken from Buchs, St. Gallen, Sevelen and Feldkirch into Vaduz. These buses typically run every 20 to 40 minutes and are operated by LIEmobil.

Schaan-Vaduz railway station, located in Schaan, is the closest railway station to Vaduz. The station is situated on the Feldkirch–Buchs railway, Liechtenstein's only railway line, and is served by the S2 of the Vorarlberg S-Bahn, which is operated by Austrian Federal Railways (ÖBB). It was opened on 24 October 1872 by agreement with Austria-Hungary and Switzerland. There have been attempts to expand the rail network to connect with Vaduz, though these have been unsuccessful.

== Education ==
Vaduz has two primary schools: Äule Primary School, near the Vaduzer-Saal; and Ebenholz Primary School, near the University of Liechtenstein, which is also located in the town. Both schools have the same secretariat and administration. The school assignments of children are largely determined by their street addresses. There are four kindergarten sites, of the Kindergarten Bartlegrosch, in Vaduz.

Realschule Vaduz and Oberschule Vaduz are in the Schulzentrum Mühleholz II in Vaduz. Liechtensteinisches Gymnasium is also located in Vaduz. Realschule Schaan and Sportschule Liechtenstein are in nearby Schaan.

== Notable people ==
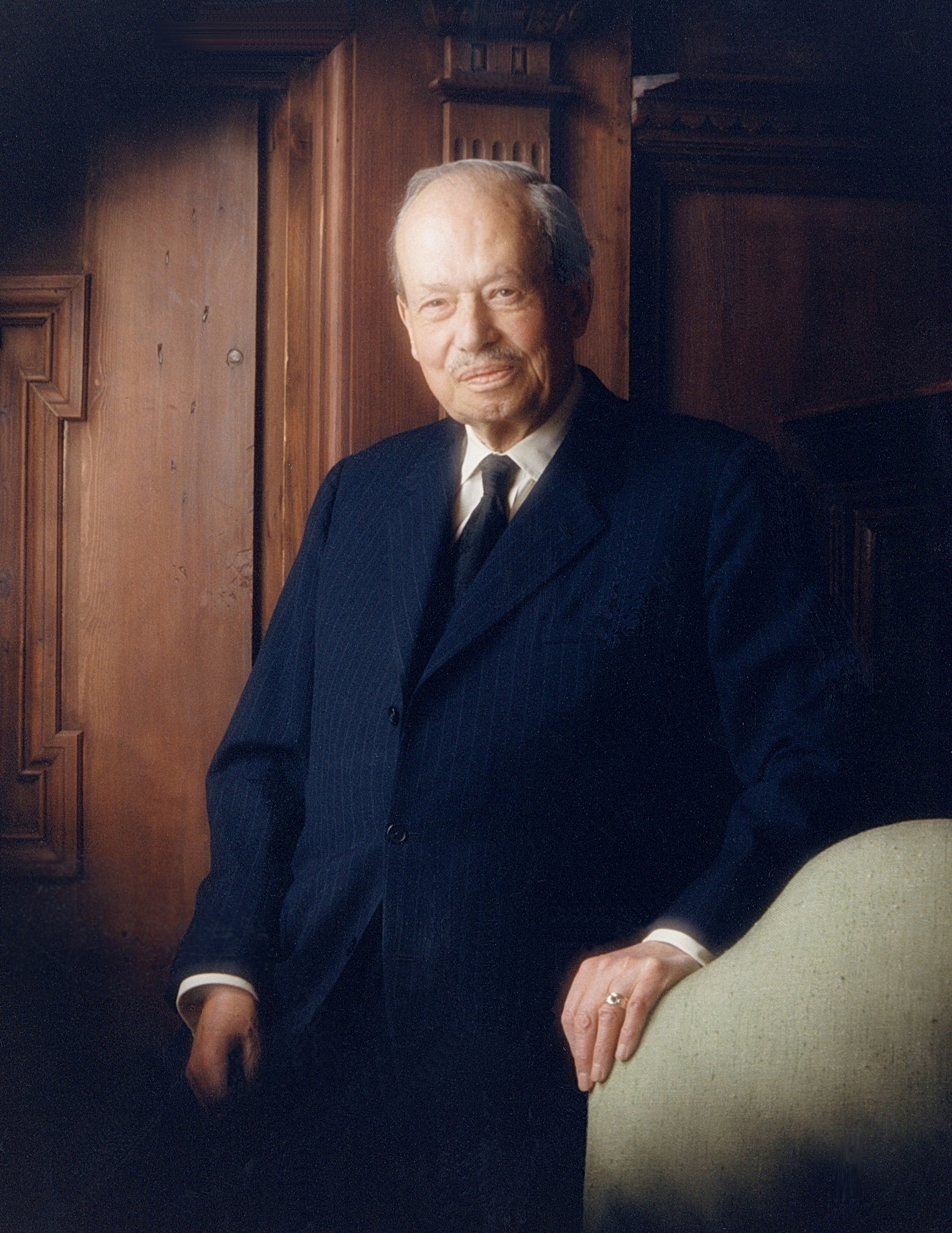
Prince Franz Josef II

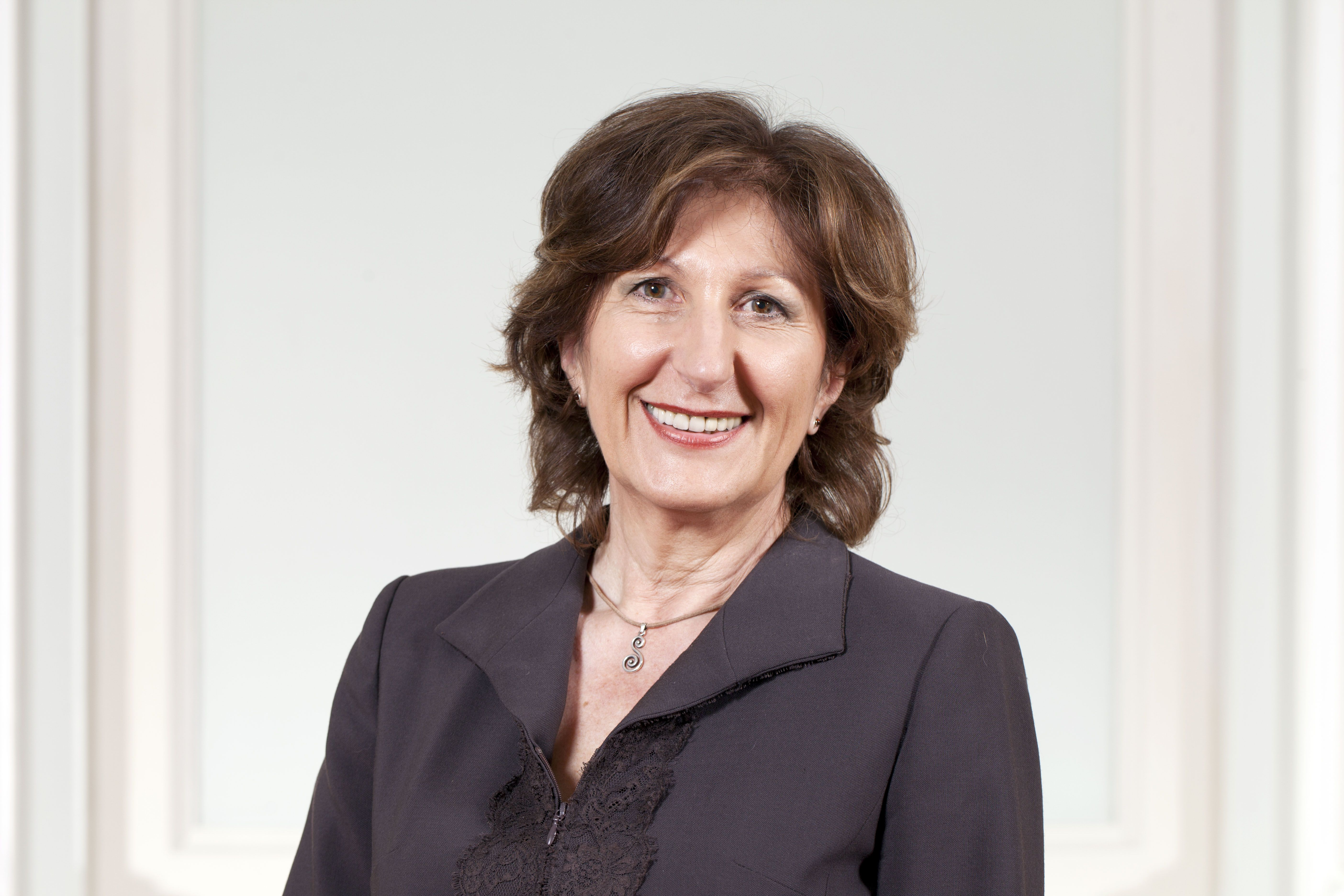
Marlies Amann-Marxer, 2013

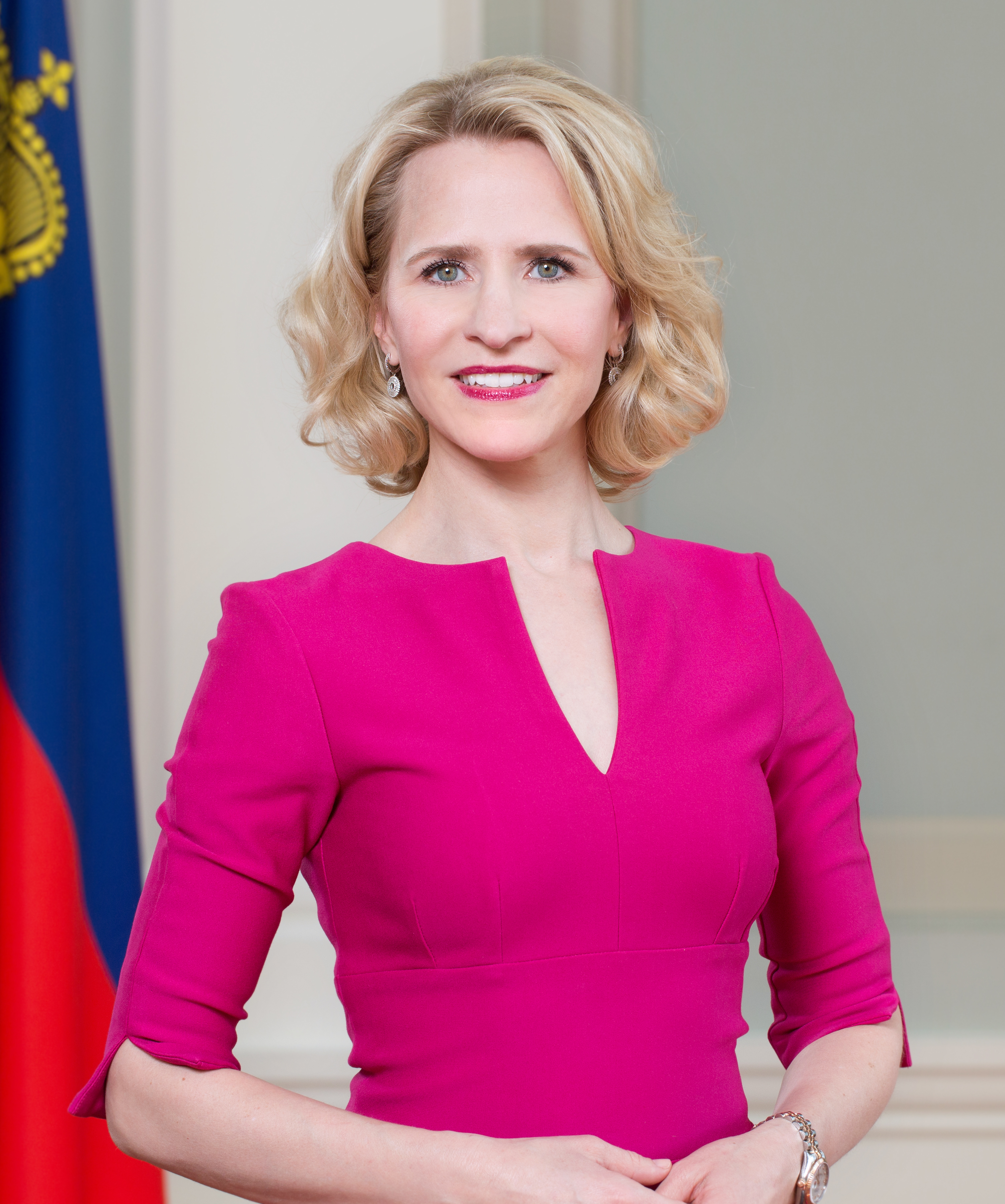
Aurelia Frick, 2017

- Alois, Hereditary Prince of Liechtenstein (born 1968 in Zürich), regent of Liechtenstein since 2004
- Prince Alois of Liechtenstein (1869–1955), prince who renounced his rights to the succession on 26 February 1923, in favour of his son Franz Joseph II
- Marlies Amann-Marxer (born 1952), politician who served as Minister of Infrastructure, Environment and Sport in the Government of the Principality of Liechtenstein
- Evelyne Bermann (born 1950), artist, specializes in glass acrylics
- Gisela Biedermann (born 1948), physician and politician
- Barbara Erni (1743–1785), thief and confidence trickster, the last person to be executed in Liechtenstein
- Franz Joseph II, Prince of Liechtenstein (1906–1989 in Grabs), the reigning Prince of Liechtenstein from 1938 until his death; lived full-time in the principality
- Aurelia Frick (born 1975), a Liechtenstein politician, Minister of Foreign Affairs, Education and Culture.
- Carl von In der Maur (1852 in Wiener Neustadt – 1913), government official
- Gilbert von In der Maur (1887–1959), military officer, leading figure of the Austrian National Socialist Party
- Wolfgang Haas (born 1948), first archbishop of the Archdiocese of Vaduz
- Hans-Adam II, Prince of Liechtenstein (born 1945 in Zurich), the monarch and head of state of Liechtenstein, lives in Vaduz Castle
- Adrian Hasler (born 1964), politician and the current Prime Minister of Liechtenstein
- Alexander Kellner (born 1961), Brazilian geologist and palaeontologist, expert in pterosaurs
- Medea de Novara (1905–2001), actress who appeared in Mexican films
- Josef Ospelt (1881–1962), first Prime Minister of Liechtenstein from 2 March 1921 to 27 April 1922
- Ida Ospelt-Amann (1899–1996), poet who wrote and performed in the Vaduz Alemannic dialect
- Hermine Rheinberger (1864–1932), writer
- Josef Rheinberger (1839–1901), organist and composer
- Christoph Zeller (born 1956 or 1957), German billionaire businessman, owns Ivoclar Vivadent

=== Footballers ===
- Ronny Büchel (born 1982), international footballer, played 72 games for the national side
- Andreas Christen (born 1989), international footballer, played 27 games for the national side
- Mathias Christen (born 1987), international footballer, played 36 games for the national side
- Lucas Eberle (born 1990), played 12 games for the national side
- Philippe Erne (born 1986), international footballer, 34 games for the national side
- Maximilian Göppel (born 1997), plays for FC Vaduz and the Liechtenstein national team
- Nicolas Hasler (born 1991), professional footballer, played 55 games for the national side
- Rainer Hasler (1958–2014), played as a defender, selected by the Liechtenstein Football Association as the country's Golden Player
- Marco Ritzberger (born 1986), played for FC Vaduz and played 35 games for the national side
- Dennis Salanović (born 1996), international footballer, played 29 games for the national side
- Sandro Wieser (born 1993), professional footballer, played 47 games for the national side
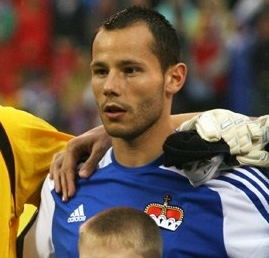
Ronny Büchel, 2009

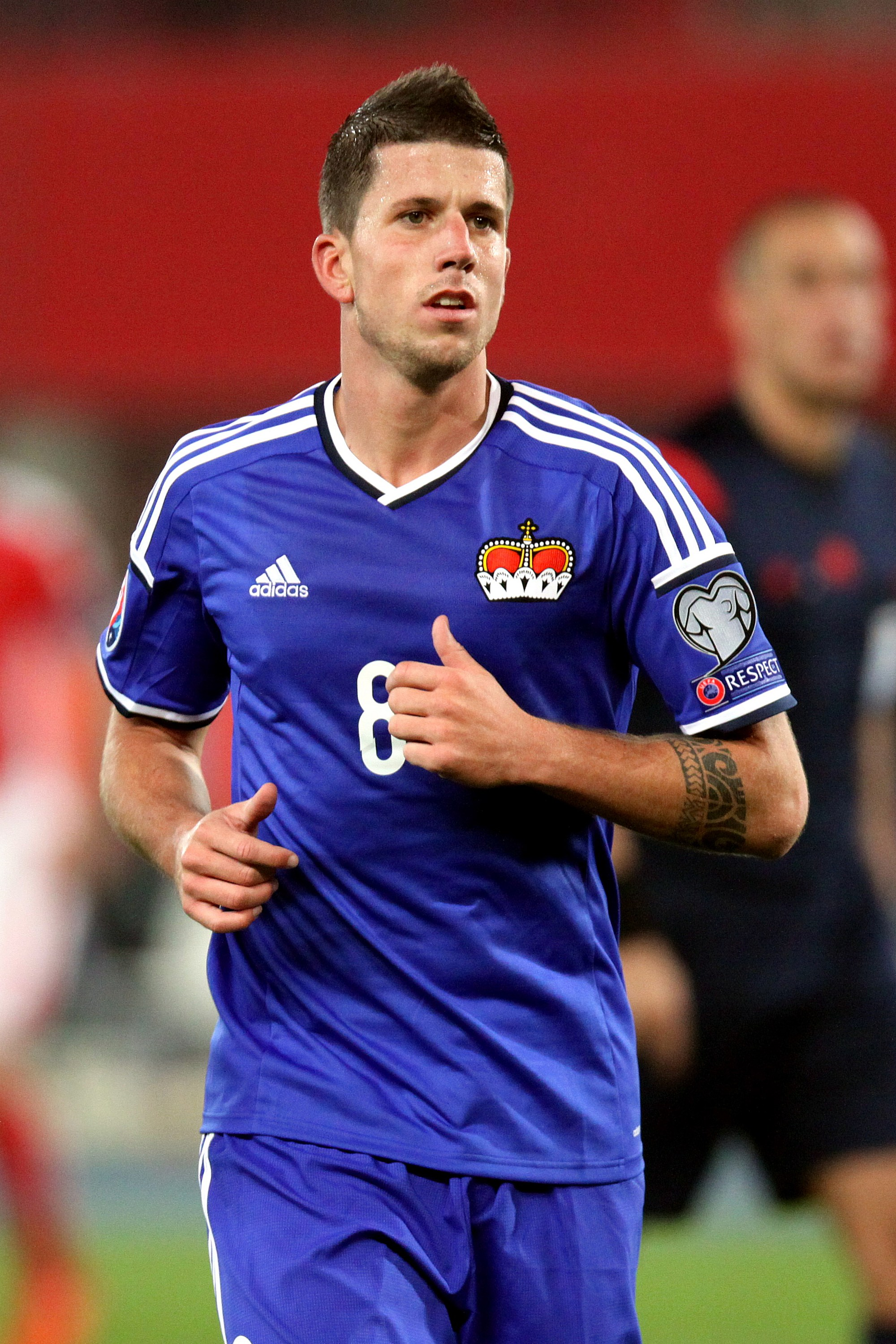
Sandro Wieser, 2015

=== Other athletes ===
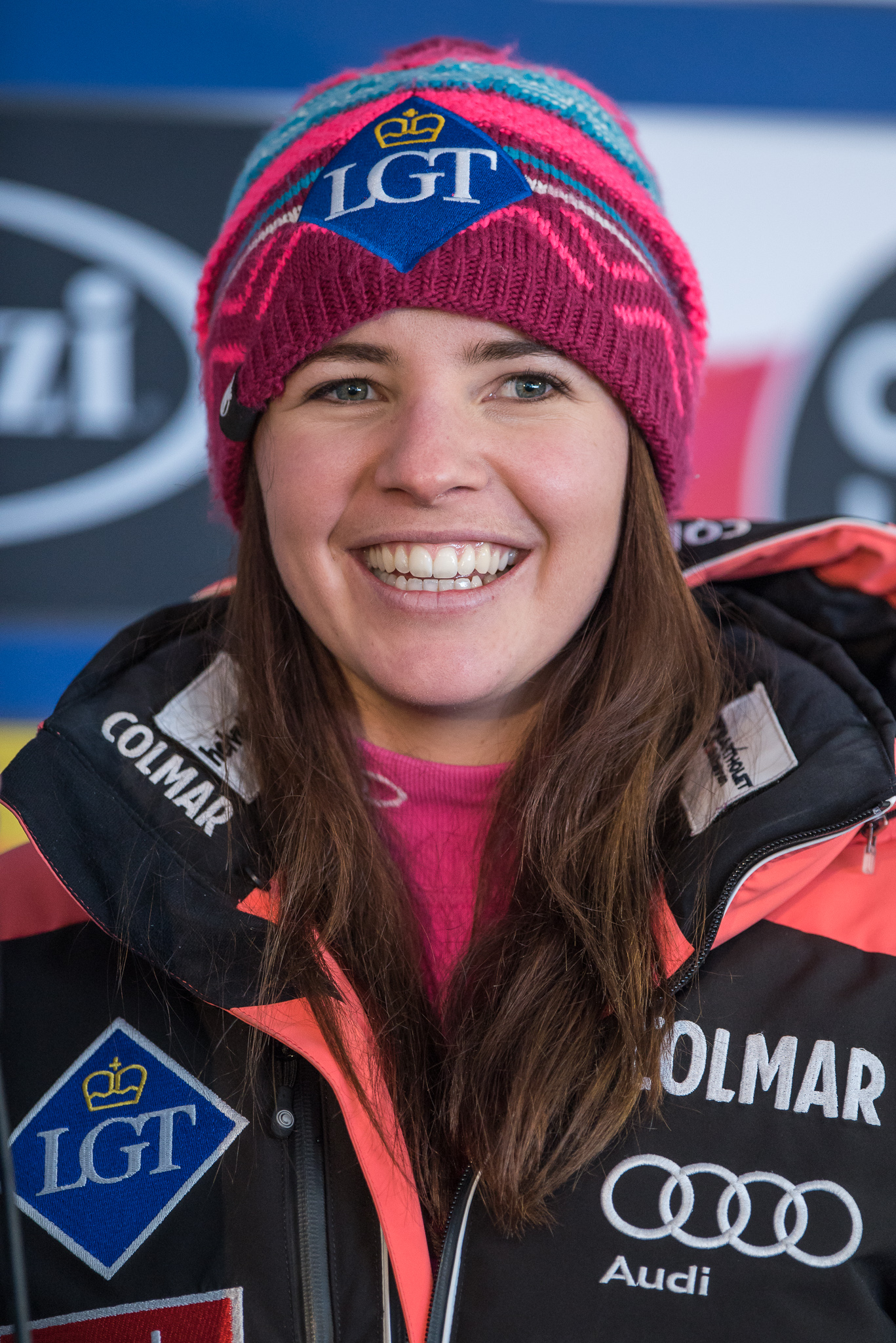
Tina Weirather, 2017

- Franz Biedermann (born 1946), a Liechtenstein decathlete, competed in the 1968 Summer Olympics
- Kathinka von Deichmann (born 1994), tennis player
- Markus Ganahl (born 1975), retired alpine skier, competed in the 2002 Winter Olympics
- Nicola Kindle (born 1991), alpine skier
- Marina Nigg (born 1984), alpine skier, competed at the 2010 Winter Olympics
- Daniel Rinner (born 1990), cyclist
- Stephanie Vogt (born 1990), retired professional tennis player
- Tina Weirather (born 1989), World Cup alpine ski racer
- Guido Wolf (1924–1994), former sports shooter, competed at the 1960 Summer Olympics

== See also ==
- List of foundations established in Vaduz
- Municipalities of Liechtenstein
- Rheinpark Stadion
- Vaduz Cathedral
