= Lila Guerrero =

Argentine poet, translator, essayist, playwright

Lila Guerrero (born Elizabeth Innokentevna Yakovlev; June 16, 1906 – December 24, 1986) was a Jewish poet, translator, essayist, playwright and literary critic famous for translating numerous Russian and Soviet modern poetry into Spanish.

== Biography ==
Guerrero was born Elizabeth Innokentevna Yakovlev, and she used the pseudonym Elsa Betty Iakovleff and Lila Guerrero. She was the daughter of Ida Isakovna Bondareff (1887-1977), a Jewish Russian socialist militant and founder of the Communist Party of Argentina who had to emigrate due to her political activity and settled in Argentina as part of the first Jewish migration to Argentina. Her father, Innokenti Yakovlev who had also emigrated to Argentina, returned to Russia before World War I. Her mother then married engineer and writer Moisés Kantor, who adopted Guerrero as his daughter. Kantor and Isakovna Bondareff had a son in 1922, Karl M. Kantor. Both Kantor and Isakovna Bondareff were active in the Argentine Communist Party, and Guerrero herself also joined.

In 1925, Kantor moved to Moscow to become head of the Department of Mineralogy at the Russian State Agrarian University – Moscow Timiryazev Agricultural Academy, followed the next year with the rest of the family. From 1926 - 1937 Guerrero lives in Moscow, Russia. There she interacted with Vladimir Mayakovsky and Lilya Brik, and met and married fellow Argentine Luis Víctor Sommi, who was the General Secretary of the Communist Party of Argentina and her husband until her death.

She participated in the Spanish Civil War, for which she was decorated with the Order of the Red Star. She then returned to Argentina, where she graduated with degrees in Philosophy and Philology in Letters from the University of Buenos Aires.

Lila Guerrero died in Buenos Aires on December 24, 1986.

== Works ==
She translated numerous Russian and Soviet authors, into Spanish, especially modern poets. She also wrote poetry and essays, and translated from Portuguese and English.

Among her most remembered works are the first Castilian versions of selected works by Mayakovsky in four volumes (Platina, 1959) and the complete theater of Maxim Gorky in five volumes (Quetzal, 1962).

She translated and wrote the prologue of the novel La defeat (1920) by Aleksandr Fadéyev and translated the essay Leon Tolstoi, by NK Gudzij (Nikolaj Kalinikovič Gudzij) published by Editorial Pueblos Unidos, Montevideo, Uruguay (1945).

Other translations were of works by Nikolai Ostrovsky, Dmitry Furmanov, Alexander Pushkin, Mikhail Lermontov, Ilya Ehrenburg, Konstantin Simonov, Aleksey Nikolayevich Tolstoy, Boris Pasternak, among others.

=== Books ===
- Las Heroicas mujeres de España: Discursos "The Heroic Women of Spain: Discourses" (Speeches of Gregorio Bermann, Lila Guerrero and Dolores Ibárruri as tributes to the Argentine people from March 28, 1937 (co-authored with Dolores Ibarruri, Asunción: Editorial Indo-Americana, 1938 )
- Intimas (poetry, 1940)
- Dolor Armado (poetry, Santiago: Ediciones Aconcagua, 1946)
- Antología de Maiakovski, su vida y su obra (translations, Buenos Aires: Claridad, 1943)
- Teatro ruso (Buenos Aires: Claridad, 1946)
- Pasional Argentina (poetry, Santiago: Ediciones Aconcagua, 1955)
- Intimando con el Cielo (poetry, Santiago: Ediciones Aconcagua, 1960)
- Antología Poética: Vladimir Maiacovsky (translations, Lima : Ediciones del Centro de Estudiantes de Medicina de la Universidad Nacional Mayor de San Marcos, 1964; Buenos Aires: Losada, 1970 and 1985)
- Mis Devociones (poetry, Santiago: Ediciones Aconcagua, 1966)
- Voces y Silencios de la Pintura "Voices and Silences of Painting" (poetry and translations, Buenos Aires: Editorial Losada, 1971)
- Poesía-pintura, 32 Poemas A 32 Pintores "Poetry-Painting, 32 poems of 32 painters" (Buenos Aires: Editorial Losada, 1971)
- Los Precursores (notes on encounters with Picasso, Pablo Neruda and other cultural figures, Buenos Aires: Editorial Losada, 1974)
- Antologia poética "Poetic Anthology" 1946-1976 (Buenos Aires: G. Pineda, 1976)
- Voces y silencios de la danza (poems and translations, Buenos Aires: Ediciones Dead Weight, 1980)
- Rimbaud, la última fuga - Liceo de señoritas "Rimbaud, the Lat Fight" (two dramas in 3 acts, Buenos Aires: Ediciones Teatro Siglo XX - Editor Gonzalo Pineda, 1981)
- Federico García Lorca, Sus últimos días "Frederico Garcia Lorca, His Last Days" (drama, Buenos Aires: Editor Gonzalo Pineda, 1986)
