= Isa Kremer =

American-Argentine opera singer of Russian descent

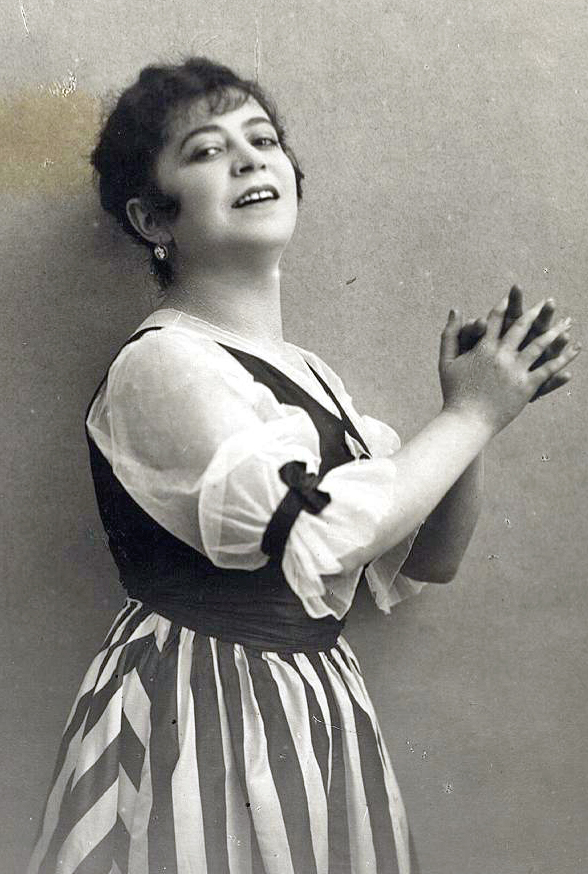
Isa Kremer

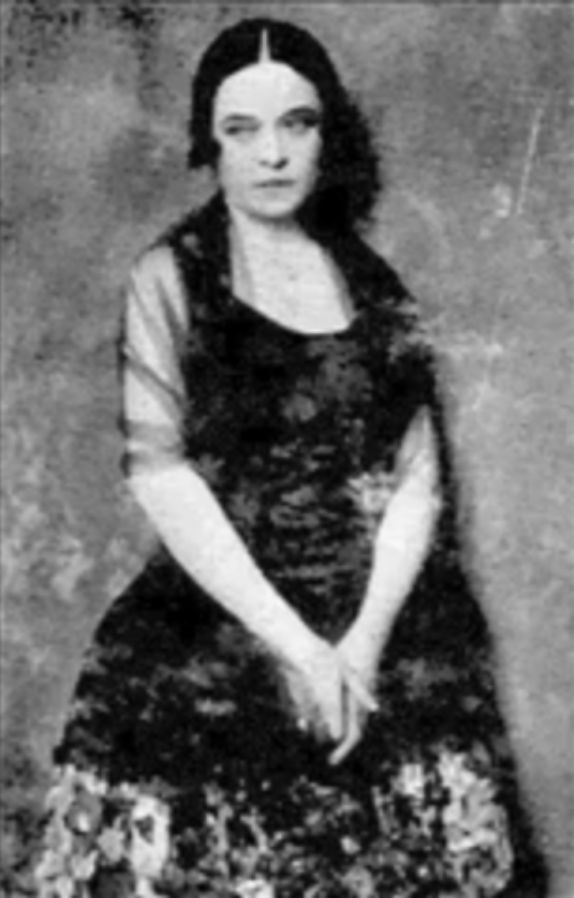
A young Isa Kremer

Isabelle Yakovlevna Kremer (Russian: Изабелла Яковлевна Кремер; 21 October 1887 – 7 July 1956) was a soprano of Russian Jewish descent who at various times of her life held citizenship in Russia, the United States, and Argentina. She first drew notice as a teenager for her revolutionary poetry which was published in an Odessa newspaper. She began her professional singing career as an opera singer in Europe during the second decade of the 20th century. By the time of her relocation to the United States in 1924, she had abandoned her opera career in favor of performing as a concert soloist and recitalist.

As a recitalist Kremer not only sang works from the classical repertoire, but also performed folk music from a variety of countries and in many languages. She was possibly the first woman to perform Yiddish song on the concert stage. In 1927 she began performing as a vaudeville artist while continuing to perform extensively as a recitalist. In 1938, she moved to Argentina where she lived the last 18 years of her life. In 2000 her life was the subject of a television documentary entitled Isa Kremer: The People's Diva which was made for The Jewish Channel.

== Early life and career in Europe ==
Kremer was born to Jewish parents in the city of Belz which was then part of the territory known as Bessarabia under Russian Imperial rule. Her father, Jacob Kremer, was a provision master in the army of Czar Nicholas II. Her mother, Anna Kremer (née Rosenbluth), was a lover of music and passed on that love to her daughter. The family was part of the bourgeois class and Isa was brought up under the care of a governess and attended a private school operated by the Russian Orthodox Church. The family moved to Odessa when Isa was 12.

As a teenager, Kremer began working as a poet; writing revolutionary poetry for a newspaper in Odessa. The newspaper's editor, Israel Heifetz, took an interest in Kremer and provided her with the funds to pursue studies in opera with Pollione Ronzi in Milan from 1902 to 1911. She was forced to stop studying and begin concertizing when her father's business failed; her mother came to her in Italy and she supported them both.

In 1911 Sholem Aleichem's story "The Chosen Ones (From the Life of Little People)" translated from Yiddish into Russian by Iza Kremer (in the journal - Kreymer) was published, which was included in the first book of the Sovremennik magazine (1911. Jan. P. 119–154). A.V. Amfiteatrov, who highly participated in creating of this magazine, wrote about Isa Kreymer to Sholom Aleichem on November 21, 1910:

"It would be nice to receive your story as going into the first book. <...> Send it in the original language. I have a very good translator that I want to try on your story".

She made her professional opera debut in 1911 at the Teatro Ponchielli in Cremona as Mimì in Giacomo Puccini's La bohème to the Rodolfo of Tito Schipa. She was then active as principal artist at the Mariinsky Theatre (then known as the Petrograd Opera) in Saint Petersburg where she starred in several operettas and was heard in various works from the concert repertoire. Some of the roles she sang there were Dolly in Franz Lehár's Endlich allein, Elvira in Lehar's Die ideale Gattin, Helen in Oskar Nedbal's Polská krev, and Laura in Karl Millöcker's Der Bettelstudent. She was later active at the Bolshoi Theatre in Moscow in 1915.

In 1914, Kremer returned to Odessa and for two years appeared in roles at the Odessa Opera and Ballet Theater; including portraying Mimì and the role of Violetta in Giuseppe Verdi's La traviata. "It was there she first discovered that her singing talent was not most suited to arias and she turned to folk music in Yiddish and other languages." She became highly active in intellectual circles, and notably became close friends with Sholem Aleichem, Hayim Nahman Bialik, Mendele Mocher Sforim, and Mark Warshawski. It was Bialik who inspired her to begin collecting Yiddish music and to include it in her concerts. Up to this point, Yiddish music had been performed solely by men, usually hazzans, within concerts. She gave her first folk concert in Moscow and it was a great success; from there she went to Turkey and later toured in Poland, German, France, England and elsewhere.

She married Israel Heifetz, Russian Jewish editor of the Odessa News, who was 27 years older than she was. Their marriage produced one child, their daughter Toussia who was born in 1917. In 1922, Kremer came to America, where her concerts were very successful. M. Osherovitsh wrote: "Hearing Isa Kremer sing Yiddish folksongs is a must for the Jewish intelligentsia."

While Odessa was her home, Kremer was also actively performing as a guest artist throughout Europe in concerts, operettas, and operas during the second decade of the 20th century. Among the roles in her stage repertoire were Tatyana in Pyotr Ilyich Tchaikovsky's Eugene Onegin and the title heroines in Jules Massenet's Manon and Puccini's Madama Butterfly. While on tour to Constantinople in 1917, the Russian Revolution occurred which proved ill fortune for Kremer and her family who were known supporters of Alexander Kerensky. The family's Odessa property was confiscated, Heifetz was imprisoned, and their daughter, governess, and Kremer's parents were forbidden from leaving the city. Kremer was eventually able to smuggle her family out of the city into Poland in 1919. The following year she managed to bribe city officials to release her husband from jail. While this family drama was going on, she made several recordings in Constantinople on the Orfeon label between 1918 and 1920.

After Kremer and her family were all reunited in Poland in 1920, the family lived briefly in Berlin but ultimately settled in Paris, France. Soon thereafter, Kremer separated from her husband. Heifetz later died while a prisoner at the Nazi concentration camp Fort Breendonk during World War II. In 1922, Kremer gave a concert tour of Poland which included performances of Jewish songs. A year later she told Jessie Abrams of The Canadian Jewish Chronicle that upon reaching Warsaw, her scheduled concert sparked an anti-Semitic riot outside the Philharmonic Concert Hall. The riot, she later said, and other experiences of antisemitism in Europe, prompted her to relocate to the United States.

== Life and career in the United States ==
Kremer first came to the United States in the autumn of 1922; arriving in New York City where she signed a contract with artistic manager Sol Hurok. She made her acclaimed American concert debut at Carnegie Hall on 29 October 1922. She eventually moved to the United States with her daughter and parents in 1924; ultimately becoming a United States citizen. She appeared regularly in concerts in NYC at Carnegie Hall and the Manhattan Opera House over the next two decades; making her final New York appearance on 3 December 1950 at Carnegie Hall. She was chiefly known in the United States as a folk singer; performing folk songs in English, French, German, Italian, Polish, Russian, and Yiddish. On 27 September 1927 she made her vaudeville debut at the Palace Theatre. That same year she made talking films for Vitaphone. She later starred in a musical at a theatre on Second Avenue in the Yiddish Theater District in 1930 opposite Seymour Rechzeit which was entitled The Song of the Ghetto. One of the songs in the musical, "Mayn shtetele Belz", was written for her by American-Jewish composer Alexander Olshanetsky. The song was about her native city and became quite famous. She also made recordings in the United States with Brunswick Records and Columbia Records.

While living in the United States, Kremer continued to tour extensively throughout the world during the 1920s and 1930s. She gave tours in the United States, Canada, Europe, Africa, Palestine, and Latin America. On many occasions, she was confronted by antisemitism; but in spite of this continued to include Jewish songs in nearly all her concerts. She notably insisted upon including Yiddish songs in her concerts at Berlin's Jüdischer Kulturbund, an institution created with the consent of the Nazis for the purpose of presenting performances for the Jewish population after Jewish performers were no longer hireable in "Aryan theatres." In 1931, a book of twenty-four Yiddish folk songs named after Kremer's popular concert series, A Jewish Life in Song was published by Chappell & Co. in London.

== Final years in Argentina ==
In 1938 Kremer emigrated to Argentina. There she met the lauded psychiatrist Dr. Gregorio Bermann who operated a highly successful practice in Buenos Aires. The couple lived together in Argentina until Isa's death of stomach cancer at the age of 69 in Córdoba, Argentina in 1956. Her daughter, Toussia, remained in the United States, marrying Dr. Kermit Pines of New Jersey.

In Argentina, Kremer suffered much hardship. Bermann was a socialist and close to the communist party and both husband and wife were blacklisted by the dictator Juan Perón. As a result, they experienced serious financial difficulties and political harassment during the 1940s and 1950s. Many of her concerts in that country during those years were for benefits that aided Nazi victims or striking workers. Several of these concerts were given in collaboration with the exiled Spanish Republican writer María Teresa León. After her death, her archives were donated to the Instituto Judio de Investigaciones in Buenos Aires. They include her vast concert repertoire of folk music; which encompasses works in a total of 24 languages.
