= Ebenholz =

- Village
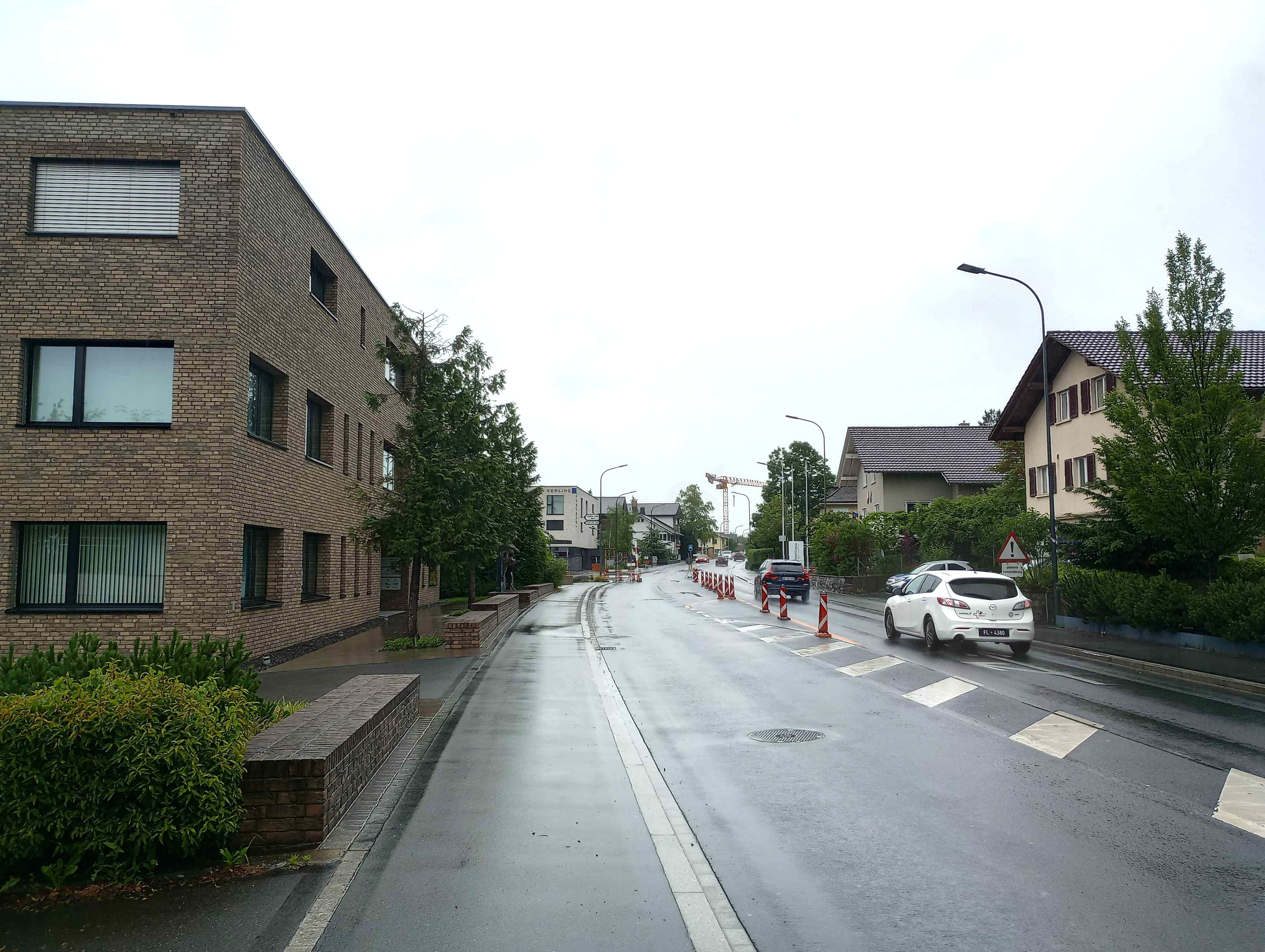
- Ebenholz in May 2024

- Locator map of Ebenholz in Liechtenstein
- Coordinates: 47°09′N 9°31′E
- Country: Liechtenstein
- Electoral district: Oberland
- Municipality: Vaduz
- Elevation: 455 m (1,493 ft)
- Time zone: UTC+1 (CET)
  - Summer (DST): UTC+2 (CEST)
- Postal code: 9490
- Area code: (+423) ...

Ebenholz (German pronunciation: [ˈeːbn̩ˌhɔlts]; also called Ebaholz) is a village in Liechtenstein, located in the municipality of Vaduz. Its name means "ebony" in German.

== Geography ==
The village lies in the center of the country, just in the north of Vaduz, and south of Schaan, close to the village of Mühleholz.

== Economy ==
Orca Engineering was a Swiss-founded and Ebenholz-based sports car maker, which produced one of the fastest cars in the world, the R113.
