= Isa Kremer: The People's Diva =

Isa Kremer: The People's Diva, is a documentary produced in 2000 and directed by Nina Baker Feinberg and Ted Schillinger. It focuses on Isa Kremer, an international singing sensation.

== Summary ==
Isa performed modern renditions of traditional Jewish folk songs for audiences around the world, refusing to conceal her Jewish culture even during the Holocaust. The film explores the life of a woman who brought Jewish music to international audiences. Isa Kremer reconstructs the singer's life through archival footage of her performances, family interviews, and the critic's responses to her shows. She had a beautiful, well-trained voice but, it was her alluring presence that enthralled audiences.

As a young girl, Isa was marked by a fierce talent, independent mind and firm determination. At age fifteen, her poems were being published in the liberal "Odessa News." Isa enjoyed early career success as a classical and opera singer. However, it was Jewish poet Chaim Bialik upon seeing her perform suggested that she sing Jewish folk songs instead. Isa took the advice to heart and immediately rethought her performances. She began to sing in Yiddish and adapted Jewish folk songs for the stage. Trained in opera, Ida combined singing and acting in a novel way, embodying the characters she sang about, and made simple folk songs part of a grand tradition. With her unique show and dazzling stage presence, Isa toured internationally. This allowed her to befriend the social elite and intelligentsia (including Albert Einstein), collect stunning jewelry and receiving lavish praise. One critic described her as "a radiant incarnation of artist's witchery.”

Despite her success, Isa's life was never easy. She saw some of the 20th century's most violent political failures. War and revolution seemed to follow her wherever she went. Isa was born in Russia, and when the Revolution broke out, it separated her family. She moved away from Europe before the Holocaust, but watched it destroy the lives of her family and the shtetl lifestyle in which she was raised. Then, in the last chapters of her life, she witnessed brutal political unrest in her adopted home country of Argentina.

Isa Kremer participates in a debate that's still relevant today – the working woman. To travel and perform as freely as she did, Isa had to make sacrifices. Relationships and her family were secondary to her demanding career. Isa's daughter gives a sad smile while explaining that she was raised by a wet nurse and knew her mother only by the splendid parties that were thrown when she came home from touring.

The documentary also recognizes the struggle between cultural and personal identity. Isa was not religious and never wanted to be a Jewish singer; she wanted to be a great singer. But she expected that her Yiddish songs would appeal to everyone, not just Jews. "It must be an art for the great mass of people," she explained, believing Jewish folk songs were so rich in meaning and beauty they could touch all of humanity.
