= Pollione Ronzi =

Italian opera singer and composer (1833–1915)

Pollione Ronzi (27 February 1833 in Bologna – 3 September 1915 in Milan) was an Italian operatic tenor, composer, conductor, and voice teacher. He sang roles at many important opera houses in Italy, including La Scala in Milan. In 1867, he was heard at the opera house in Livorno as Egidio in Errico Petrella's La contessa d'Amalfi. In 1871, he sang the role of Rodrigo in Gioachino Rossini's Otello at the Teatro Regio di Torino. In 1874, he became manager and conductor at the Teatro Manzoni in Milan. In 1876, he sang in recital alongside soprano Ida Corani with Clara Schumann as their accompanist in the Royal Philharmonic Society's concert season in London. He had sung in orchestral concerts with the RPS a year earlier under conductor William Cusins.

As a composer, Ronzi is best known for his operas. His first opera, Gastone di Anverse, premiered at the Teatro della Pergola in Florence in the autumn of 1853. This was followed in 1854 by Buon Gusto which was first performed at the Teatro di San Carlo. His opera, Dea, premiered at the Vienna State Opera on 4 August 1894. In the early 20th century, he was active as a voice teacher in Naples and Milan. His notable pupils included soprano Isa Kremer and tenor Franco De Gregorio.
