= Orca Engineering =

Lichtensteiner sports car company

Orca Engineering Ltd.
- Company type: Family-owned corporation
- Industry: Automotive
- Founded: 2003
- Headquarters: Ebenholz, Vaduz, Liechtenstein
- Key people: René Beck, CEO & founder Ralph Beck, co-founder
- Number of employees: 15

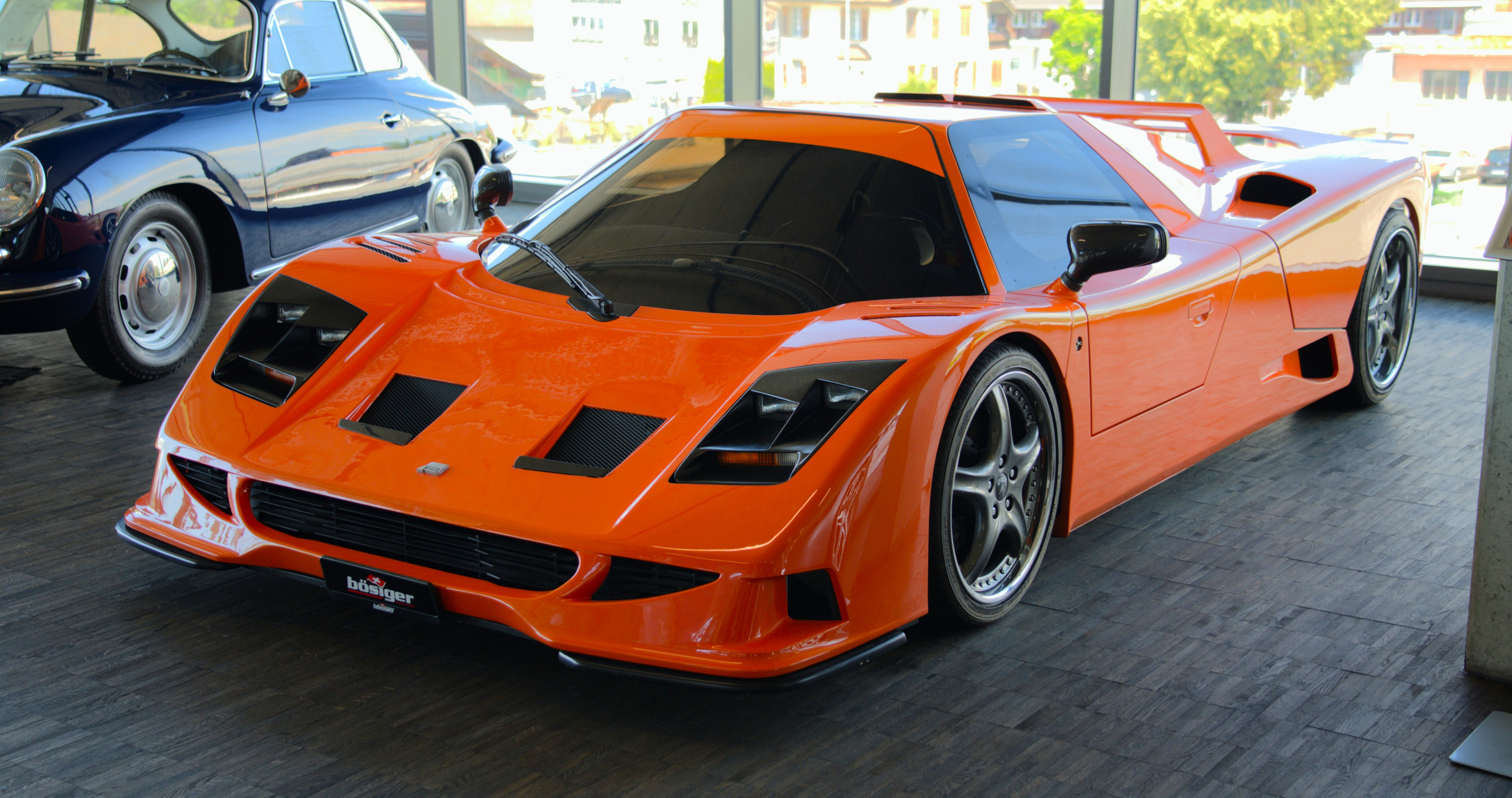
Orca C113

Orca Engineering was a sports car company based in Liechtenstein.

Orca designed and manufactured the Orca 113 platform, as well as the upcoming Beck LM800. Founded in 2003 by René Beck and his son Ralph, the company is most known for the Orca 113 Platform, which came in three variants (of which only seven cars were produced).

When the Orca 113 platform died out in 2007, René Beck decided to move on to his next supercar project, the Beck LM800.

== Orca 113 platform ==
The Orca 113 platform is a platform of vehicles produced by Orca Engineering. 198 vehicles were planned to be made in three variants, but only 7 were produced (3 C113s, 2 R113s, and 2 SC7s).

=== C113 ===
The C113 was a coupé, and the first concept car manufactured in the Orca 113 platform. It has a claimed top speed of 360 km/h, though this has not been officially tested. However, the C113 was proven to be the fourth fastest car in the world for its time (0–100 km in under 3 seconds). Production of the 113 cars had been limited to 198 units (in all three variants), but never began due to delays and the lack of buyers (7 were produced in all three version). The C113 sold for around $280,000 US, not including attentional packages.

- Acceleration: 0–100 km/h in under 3 seconds
- Top speed: approx 360 km/h

=== R113 ===
The R113 is a concept roadster version of the C113, with only 2 made. Before the Orca 133 Platform was cancelled, the R113 was going to be fastest street worthy car in the world (0–100 km in 2.5 seconds). Almost nothing is known about the R113 concept, except it uses the same Audi twin turbo V8 as the Beck LM 800, other performance info is below.

- Acceleration: 0–100 km/h in under 2.5 seconds
- Top speed: approximately 410 km/h

=== SC7 ===
The SC7 would have been by far the most exclusive vehicle Orca manufactured. Not much is known about the SC7. It only weighs 850 kg, and is built around an Audi twin turbo V12, and has a top speed of over 400 km/h. The production of the SC7 would have been limited to 7 units.

- Acceleration: 0–100 km/h in under 2.7 seconds
- Top speed: approximately 400 km/h

== Beck LM 800 ==
As of 2012, the Beck LM 800 was the only vehicle under development at Orca Engineering. Almost nothing is known about the LM 800, except it uses the same Audi twin turbo V8 as the R113, and weights 900 kg. Other performance info is listed below.

- Acceleration: 0–100 km/h in under 2.8 seconds
- Top speed: approximately 420 km/h
