= Ronny Büchel =

Liechtenstein footballer

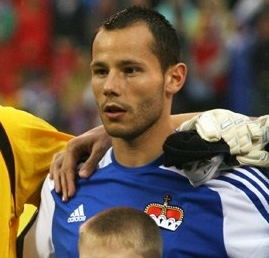

Personal information
- Date of birth: 19 March 1982 (age 44)
- Place of birth: Vaduz, Liechtenstein
- Position: Midfielder

Senior career*
Years	Team	Apps	(Gls)
2000–2003	FC Vaduz	20	(2)
2001–2002	→ Young Boys (loan)	1	(0)
2003–2004	Chur 97		
2004–2011	Eschen Mauren	65	(13)
2011–2012	Ruggell		
2013–2015	Buchs		
2015–2016	Triesen		
2017	Triesenberg		

International career
1998–2010	Liechtenstein	72	(0)

Managerial career
- 2011–2012: Ruggell (player-coach)
- * Club domestic league appearances and goals

Ronny Büchel (born 19 March 1982) is a Liechtensteiner former international footballer who last played as a midfielder for FC Triesen, and formerly played for FC Vaduz, Young Boys, FC Chur 97, USV Eschen/Mauren, FC Ruggell and Buchs.

== Career ==
=== Club career ===
Büchel's first big success was the Swiss championship title with the U17 team in Liechtenstein, which takes part in the Swiss Youth Championship. In 2001 he moved to the National League B with FC Vaduz and then switched to the Swiss first division club BSC Young Boys from Bern. In Bern, however, the 19-year-old was unable to break through and moved back to FC Vaduz after only one year. There too, the offensive player was plagued by many injuries and he hardly came into practice, which led him to move to FC Chur 97 in the third Swiss league. There he showed an increasing shape curve after starting difficulties, but nevertheless he moved to the Liechtenstein club USV Eschen-Mauren at the beginning of the 2004/05 season, which played in the fourth Swiss league.

=== Coaching and later career ===
In the summer 2011 he moved to Liechtenstein club FC Ruggell as a player-coach. He left the club in 2013.

Since 2009, Büchel have had several functions as a coach for the Liechtenstein Football Association (LFV), mainly working with the youth players. In January 2013, he was hired as a chief preformation for LFV and would also coach the U14 national team selection.

In the summer 2013, he joined FC Buchs. He then joined FC Triesen in July 2015.

In 2017 he played for FC Triesenberg.
