= Christoph Zeller =

German businessman

- Born: 1956 or 1957 (age 68–69); Germany
- Citizenship: Liechtenstein
- Known for: owner and chairman of Ivoclar Vivadent
- Spouse: married

Christoph Zeller (born 1956 or 1957) is a German billionaire businessman. He is the owner of Ivoclar Vivadent, a Liechtenstein dental products company.

== Early life ==
Zeller was born in Germany.

== Career ==
Zeller joined Ivoclar Vivadent in 1981, and was CEO from 1990 to 2003, before buying the company from his grandfather, Adolf Schneider. He was chairman of the supervisory board from 1993 to June 2019 . He was also CEO of the company from 1990 to 2003.

On the Forbes 2018 list of the world's billionaires, he was ranked #572 with a net worth of US$3.9 billion. He is supposedly the only billionaire of Liechtenstein, and his fortune supposedly represents half of Liechtenstein's GDP.

== Personal life ==
Zeller is married to Christina Zeller and resides in Vaduz, Liechtenstein. Christina Zeller joined the board of directors of Ivoclar Vivadent in June 2018.
