= Sylvia Bermann =

Sylvia Bermann M.D.
- (undated)
- Born: 1922; Córdoba, Argentina
- Died: September 17, 2012 (aged 89–90); Córdoba
- Education: National University of Córdoba
- Occupation: Psychiatirst
- Relatives: Gregorio Bermann (father)

Sylvia Bermann (Córdoba, 1922 - Córdoba, September 17, 2012) was an Argentine psychiatrist, public health specialist, essayist, and member of the guerrilla group Montoneros. She spent several years in Mexico before returning to Argentina to practice her profession and manage the clinic that her father, Gregorio Bermann, had established.

== Early life and education ==
Sylvia's father, Gregorio Bermann came from a family of Russian Jews, who arrived in Buenos Aires at the end of the 19th century. Gregorio was a leader of the first stage of the university Reform of 1918. He married the Buenos Aires socialist professor Leonilda Barrancos, who hailed from a family of ranchers from Chivilcoy. Gregorio and Leonilda had three children: Sylvia, Daniel Gregorio (died at the age of a year and a half) and Claudio Santiago (psychoanalyst, who would settle in Barcelona).

In 1921, the family moved to Córdoba because the father would teach at the National University of Córdoba. Sylvia grew up in a family where political and social commitment was daily, where politics was constantly discussed and socialist values were promoted. Her parents separated, and when the Popular Front won in Chile, Leonilda decided to go to work in that country. In Santiago, living with her mother, Sylvia began a medical degree at the University of Chile.

At that time, Sylvia joined the direct political militancy in the FJS (Socialist Youth Federation) in Santiago. Salvador Allende was Minister of Health, and he was a close friend of Sylvia and Leonilda. In 1943, Gregorio was arrested in the city of Córdoba, and imprisoned. Sylvia ―who was in her third year of Medicine studies― decided to return to Argentina. She would visit her father in jail and bring him food in some suitcases. Gregorio was released when the 1944 San Juan earthquake occurred.

Sylvia and her father returned to Córdoba with the intention that Sylvia resumes her third year of medicine. But the rector of the National University of Córdoba was León S. Morra, a very reactionary psychiatrist, a bitter enemy of Gregorio -and one of those responsible for his arrest- and he did not want to admit Sylvia to the university. Ergo, Sylvia moved to the National University of La Plata, where she completed the entire third year. When Morra was pushed out of the University of Córdoba, Sylvia was able to return to her parents' house to complete her degree. In those years, she was general secretary of the University Federation of Córdoba (FUC) and director of that organization's newspaper. She graduated as a psychiatrist.

== Career ==
=== Argentina ===
Sylvia was a university professor of psychiatry at the University of La Plata and University of Buenos Aires. She obtained a postgraduate degree in Public Health and Mental Health at Harvard University. For twenty years, she was the director of the Hospital Interzonal General de Agudos Presidente Perón, in Avellaneda, Buenos Aires Province , Argentina. She taught psychiatry at the Universidad Autónoma Metropolitana Unidad Xochimilco, in Coyoacán, Mexico City, Mexico.

Around 1972, Sylvia -50 years old- joined the Montoneros, an Argentine left-wing Peronist guerrilla organization. She then worked in mental health centers in Buenos Aires. In 1976 ―along with Gervasio Paz, Valentín Barenblit, Vicente Galli, and Dicky Grimson, among others― she was part of the board of directors of the Argentine Federation of Psychiatry (FAP), of which she was elected president before the military coup. from 1976.

Sylvie had two daughters: Irene and Nora. Her daughter, Irene Laura Torrents (1954-1977), a student at the Faculty of Exact and Natural Sciences at the University of Buenos Aires, was also a Montonero. On November 13, 1976 -at the age of 22- Irene was kidnapped by the National Reorganization Process, together with her 8-month-old son, Martín. She remained detained at Escuela de Mecánica de la Armada (centro clandestino de detención). Her son was taken from her during her disappearance (and recovered by Sylvia). Irene was thrown alive into the Río de la Plata on the Vuelos de la muerte (Argentina) (Flights of Death). Her body was never recovered.

On the night of November 12, 1976, Sylvia's house was ransacked. She was unable to return home, and had to abandon everything she had to escape across land with her grandson Martín with a name fake, through Puerto Iguazú, Misiones Province to Foz do Iguaçu, Brazil. In Brazil, Sylvia's ex-husband was waiting for her. Many fellow exiles in Mexico told Sylvia to emigrate there and she did so, along with her grandson and her other daughter, Norah.

=== Mexico ===
In her exile in Mexico City, she was the organization secretary of the Rama de Intelectuales, Profesionales y Artistas del Movimiento Peronista Montonero (MPM). She was a member of the Superior Council of Montoneros in exile. They had formed a group, and even had a public house, a local MPM in the capital. She worked and was active there, along with Miguel Bonasso, Juan Gelman, and many other comrades. They denounced the crimes against humanity of the Videla dictatorship. At one point, Sylvia decided to return to Argentina and her colleagues prevented her from doing so.

During this time in Mexico, she developed strong disagreements with Mario Firmenich ("el Pepe") ―the head of the Montoneros― and the rest of the leadership. They raised these differences in Managua, Nicaragua, having decided on a "counteroffensive" in a leadership meeting. This was received with total coldness by Firmenich and others. Not reaching an agreement, Sylvia broke with Montoneros.

In Mexico, through the group Trabajadores Argentinos de la Salud Mental (Argentine Mental Health Workers), Sylvia denounced the application of torture and "the most varied methods of destruction, at a psychological level, of legal and illegal prisoners" by the Videla dictatorship. In 1979, she joined the "Adriana Haidar health brigade". (Note: According to an article on the Roberto Baschetti website, Adriana Isabel Haidar was a militant Peronist from Montonera, who was possibly killed on February 27, 1977 by the military dictatorship.) of Montoneros, which provided assistance to the Nicaraguan people in the final stages of the Sandinista struggle. In Mexico, Sylvia formed a health assistance brigade to collaborate with the Sandinistas and later directed the Equipo de Salud Mental México-Nicaragua with Marie Langer and Nacho Maldonado.

Within the montonera leadership, Sylvia had a confrontation with Rodolfo Galimberti. Sylvia denounced him at a Council meeting in Mexico, as she had proof that he used the organization's money to seduce young women. In March 1980, Sylvia withdrew from the Superior Council of the Montonero Peronist Movement. On April 10, 1980, as a result of various discussions and internal dissent of exiled Montonero militants, especially with regard to militarism and rejecting the positive estimate that the national leadership made regarding the results of the counteroffensive, a new fracture of this organization occurred, creating a new political force whose name was M17 (Montoneros 17 de Octubre). It was announced at a conference in Mexico City, where they presented two documents explaining the causes of the split. However, this group had little activity and ephemeral existence. Its provisional council was made up of Sylvia as well as Eduardo Astiz, Gerardo Bavio, Miguel Bonasso, René Chaves, Olimpia Díaz de Dri, Jaime Dri, Ernesto Jauretche, Pedro Orgambide, Pablo Ramos, Julio Rodríguez Anido, Susana Sanz and Daniel Vaca Narvaja.

=== Return to Argentina ===
In December 1983, when the military left power in Argentina, Sylvia returned to the city of Córdoba to practice her profession. She also returned to the management of the Gregorio Bermann Institute, a clinic created by her father in that city, which had been managed by her brother, the psychoanalyst Claudio Bermann. In 1977, Claudio was saved by the United States Secretary of State Henry Kissinger from being disappeared by the Videla dictatorship.

In March 1987, federal judge Miguel Pons ordered Sylvia's preventive detention for "illicit association". She was later dismissed for lack of evidence. At that time, Sylvia also coordinated a multidisciplinary workshop to support the children of the disappeared.

Her institute had a contract with the national government to care for patients through the PAMI. Due to lack of funds, the clinic building was eventually appropriated by the banks that had provided loans. She was a member of the Center for Psychosocial Studies (in Córdoba), and of the Buenos Aires Forum for Human Rights.

== Death ==
Sylvia Bermann died on September 16, 2012, in Córdoba, at the age of 90.
