= Ivoclar =

Multinational dental company based in Liechtenstein

Ivoclar Vivadent AG
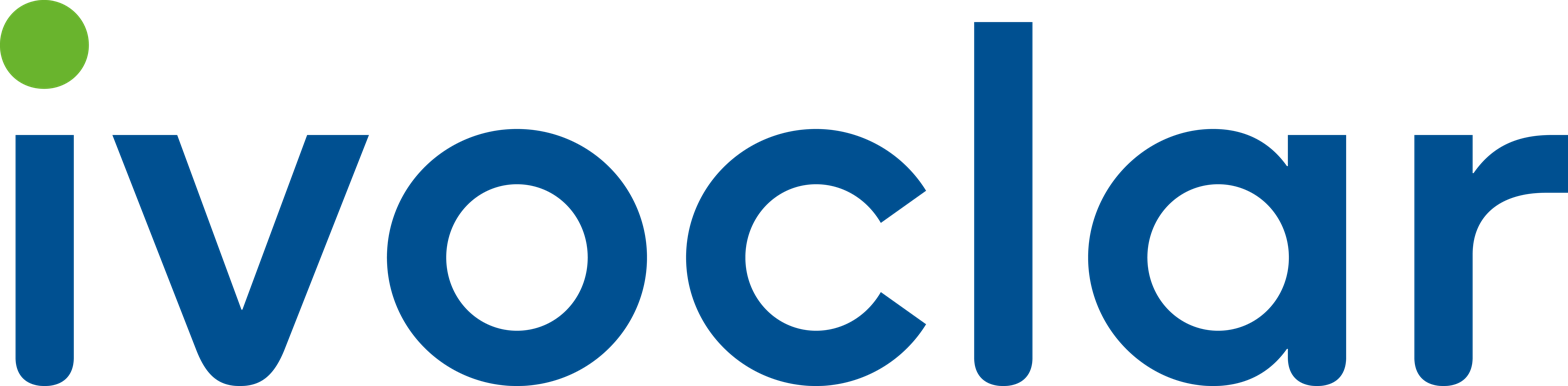
- Type: Limited company
- Industry: Dental
- Founded: 1923; 103 years ago Zurich, Switzerland, 1933; 93 years ago Liechtenstein
- Headquarters: Schaan, Liechtenstein; 47°10′18.53″N 9°30′34.13″E
- Number of locations: 56 (2023)
- Area served: Worldwide
- Key people: Matthias Donhauser (Chair, Supervisory Board); Markus Heinz (CEO)
- Revenue: 856 Mio. CHF
- Owner: Christoph Zeller
- Number of employees: 3600 (2024)
- Website: Ivoclar.com

Ivoclar is a worldwide dental company that produces a range of products and systems for dentists and dental technicians.

== History ==
Ivoclar was founded in Zurich in 1923. In 1933, it relocated in Liechtenstein. It originally produced artificial tooth, but evolved into a global manufacturer of dental care products.

In 2019, the company launched a dental consultation mobile application.

In 2022, the company dropped Vivadent, rebranding its name to just Ivoclar. In 2023, the company inaugurated its new head office building and celebrated its 100th anniversary.

== Leadership ==
In July 2019, Diego Gabathuler was appointed chief executive officer of Ivoclar, succeeding Robert Ganley, who had held the role for sixteen years. In 2023, Gabathuler resigned to pursue opportunities outside the dental industry and was succeeded by Markus Heinz.

== Description ==
Ivoclar is headquartered in Schaan, Liechtenstein. The company ships its products to around 130 countries worldwide and operates 56 subsidiaries and branch offices, employing approximately 3,600 people.

Ivoclar operates in four product areas: digital dentistry, direct restoratives, fixed prosthetics and removable prosthetics. In these areas, the company supplies dentists and dental technicians with products and product systems used across the treatment and fabrication process.

Ivoclar operates an internal research and development centre in Schaan that collaborates with universities and scientific institutes. The company also runs a training facility for dental courses and continuing professional education at its Schaan headquarters called the International Center for Dental Education (ICDE), supplemented by regional ICDE centres in other countries.

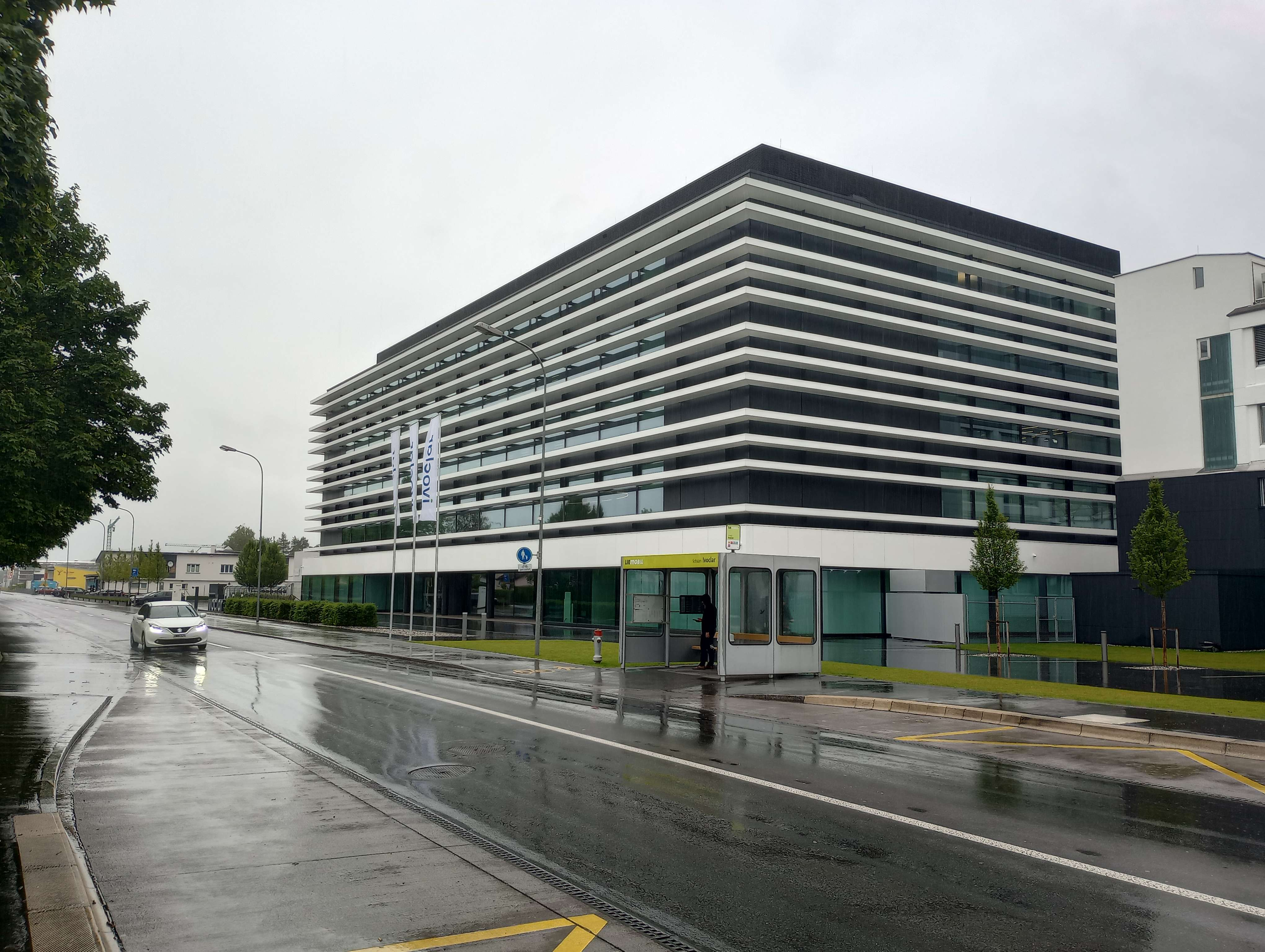
Ivoclar headquarters located in Schaan, Liechtenstein
