= Evelyne Bermann =

Liechtenstein artist (born 1950)

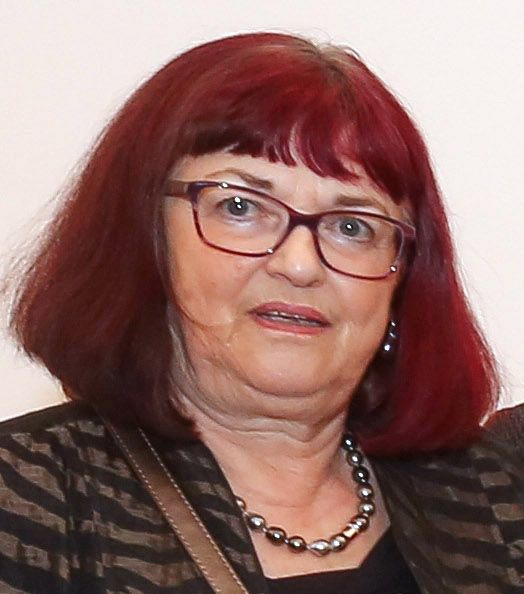
- Born: 4 May 1950 (age 76); Born in Zürich, Switzerland

Evelyne Bermann (born 4 May 1950) is a Swiss-born Liechtenstein artist who has most recently specialized in glass acrylics. She has created a number of public works and has designed Liechtenstein stamps. Bermann has been active in supporting women's suffrage in Liechtenstein as a member of Aktion Dornröschen.

== Biography ==
Born on 4 May 1950 in Zürich, Switzerland, Evelyne Bermann is the daughter of Rudolf Bermann (1909–1987), a businessman, and his wife Alice Cohn (1914–2000), a graphic artist. After matriculating from the high school in Feldkirch, Austria, she attended the Neuchâtel Art Academy (1966) and the Applied Arts School in Zürich (1967–1972). From 1972 to 1975, she worked as a graphic artist in Amsterdam, Geneva and Tel Aviv and from 1975 to 1985 at Schekolin AG in Bendern, Liechtenstein. In 1973, she became a resident of Gamprin, Liechtenstein.

From 1985 to 1992, Bermann ran her own studio in Schaan, after which she became a freelance artist, creating collages, watercolours, acrylic paintings and works of art made of enamel and of acrylic glass. Her public creations include decorative artwork at the Triesen School Centre, Vaduz High School, Schaan Town Hall, Vaduz Passport Office and the Guido-Ferger Concert Hall in Triesen. In 2012, Bermann exhibited her acrylic glass work in Schaan in connection with an Austrian television feature on "Vorarlberg heute".

In 2002, she was one of the main founders of the cultural exhibition centre Kunstraum Engländerbau in Vaduz, becoming its first director. When responsibility for the centre was assumed by the Liechtenstein Cultural Foundation in 2008, she became the centre's managing director until her retirement in September 2018. One of Liechtenstein's most significant promoters of local culture, she explained: "It has always been particularly important for me to foster close contacts with the Liechtenstein art scene and to ensure its promotion."
