= Gregorio Bermann =

Argentine psychiatrist and philosopher

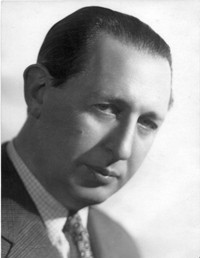
Gregorio Bermann

Gregorio Bermann (1894–1972) was an Argentine psychiatrist, philosopher, activist, author, and humanist. Born in Buenos Aires to Polish Jewish immigrants, he was the youngest of ten siblings, eight of which had been born in Poland. He was a leader in the student movement with the Argentine University Federation in Cordoba during the first half of the 20th century.

== Personal and family life ==
He was married three times, first to Leonilda Barrancos, with whom he fathered two children, Sylvia and Claudio, then to soprano Isa Kremer though they were together many years they were not legally wed. He diagnosed her Cancer prior to her death in the Fifties. He was last married to Dolores, who survived his own death in Cordoba. She mourned amongst other world leaders he had befriended, such as Salvador Allende from the neighboring Chile. He also had personal ties, through his travels that were far and wide, to President Roosevelt's wife, Eleanor, and Argentine revolutionary Che Guevara, about whom he was doing research in preparation for his next book, just prior to his death, following "Mental Health in China" which had been translated into several languages. He was also survived by two children, both Psychiatrists in the family tradition.

Bermann's son, Claudio, managed his father's Clinic (see next section) until he was jailed during the "Dirty Wars" era of Military Dictatorship in Argentina. His incarceration was due to the publication of his article, which claimed that the police force was corrupt and accused them of stealing. Eventually, Claudio was able to leave the country following a request from Kissinger. It is believed that the famous political figure noticed a lot of attention was being placed on this man's whereabouts that could endanger covert activities in that area.

The Clinic was then managed by Sylvia once she returned from teaching in the University in Mexico, where she fled to shortly after her daughter, Irene Torrents, was detained, tortured, and tossed into the ocean, still alive, by the Military (Her body has never been found...). Torrents daughter was whisked out of the country with Sylvia and her surviving child, Norah to the D.F., Mexico. After the Military left office Sylvia returned to the management of the Clinic, until the Government Contract with the P.A.M.I. (The Argentine National Service to Retired Personnel) was lost due to her refusal to pay a bribe to the official in charge of handing-out contracts. Due to lack of funds, the building eventually was lost to the crediting Banks that had been generating loans.

== Professional life ==
Bermann had a highly influential role in the university reform of 1918 in Argentina, which spread throughout the country and influenced the way Higher Education was taught in many other Latin countries. It even influencing the Student movements on the U.S. and France during the sixties, note the student riots in France in 1968. He continued to play an active role in university reform up into the 1930s. He founded the "Bermann Clinic" for Mental Health in "Las Rosas" Cordoba, after getting his degree in Psychiatry. He also studied German in order to interview Sigmund Freud in his own tongue, which he did, an entry in Freud's schedule cites the meeting with Dr. Bermann. Gregorio also brought Freudian Psychoanalysis to Argentina, and the rest of Latin America, and was the founder of the Latin American Psychiatric Association over which he presided for a number of years. His other passion was politics, and during the Spanish Civil War he leased a plane and took 16 colleagues with him to fight Hitler's new brand of Fascism in the form of General Franco. He was a Medic during the War, and it was during such times that he befriended Humanists and writers such as Miguel de Unamuno, Federico Garcia Lorca, etc. He published twenty books total, 10 on psychiatry, psychology and psychoanalysis, and also published 10 books and journal articles relating to philosophy and politics.

In politics, he was a socialist; he joined the Socialist Party of Cordoba in the 1920s and he was part of the intellectual network of the Communist Party from the 1930s onwards, participating in the anti-fascist movement and in the opposition to various right-wing governments through the years, including that of Juan Perón. However, in the 1960s he moved away from the Soviet-aligned party and towards the Cuban and to some extent Chinese versions of communism.

== Global policy ==
In 1946, the UN Economic and Social Council named him to the Technical Preparatory Committee that drew up proposals for the formation of the World Health Organization in Paris.

He was one of the signatories of the agreement to convene a convention for drafting a world constitution. As a result, for the first time in human history, a World Constituent Assembly convened to draft and adopt the Constitution for the Federation of Earth.
