= 1906 Liechtenstein general election =

- 28 and 30 July 1906
- 12 seats in the Landtag
President of the Landtag before	President of the Landtag after
Albert Schädler; Independent	Albert Schädler; Independent

General elections were held in Liechtenstein on 28 and 30 July 1906 to elect 12 of the 15 members of the Landtag. The twelve seats were indirectly elected by electors selected by voters in two constituencies, Oberland and Unterland, while the remaining three were appointed by Johann II, Prince of Liechtenstein.

== Background ==
Since the 1902 elections, member Wilhelm Fehr resigned in 1903 and was succeeded by Andreas Heeb.

The Landtag's term was characterized by passing laws such legal protection for Alpine plants in 1903, reforms to forest the same year, to the budgets of the respective Liechtenstein municipalities in 1904, and increasing the salaries of teachers in January 1906.

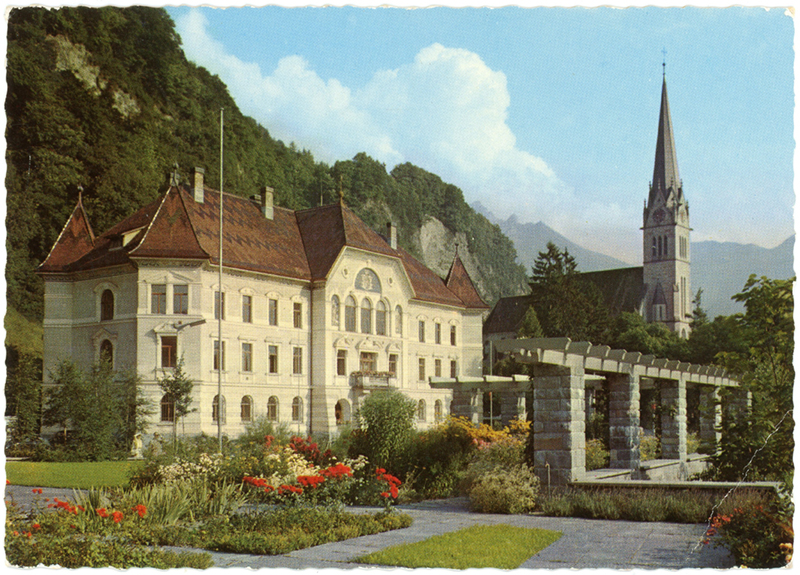
The Government Building in Vaduz was the meeting place of the Landtag from December 1905 onwards

In December 1905, the meeting place of the Landtag was moved from the Ständehaus to the newly-constructed Government Building in the capital of Vaduz.

== Electors ==
Electors were selected through elections that were held between 18 and 21 July in two electoral districts, Oberland and Unterland; they elected 118 and 74 electors respectively. Each municipality had two electors for every 100 inhabitants. All male citizens aged 24 and above were eligible to vote.

Municipality	Electors	+/–
Balzers	26	0
Eschen	22	0
Gamprin	8	0
Mauren	22	0
Planken	2	0
Ruggell	12	0
Schaan	22	0
Schellenberg	10	0
Triesen	22	0
Triesenberg	24	0
Vaduz	22	0
Total	192	0
Source: Vogt

== Results ==
The election of Oberland's Landtag members and their deputies was held on 28 July in Vaduz. Of Oberland's 118 electors, 115 were present for voting; Oberland elected seven Landtag members and three deputies. The election of Unterland's Landtag members and substitutes was held on 30 July in Mauren. Of Unterland's 74 electors, 73 were present for voting; Unterland elected five Landtag members and two deputies.

The Landtag members and their deputies were elected in three ballots, with the remaining three being appointed by Johann II, Prince of Liechtenstein on 23 August. There were no political parties and the election of members was almost entirely focused on an individual's personality.

Electoral district	Seats	Electors	Turnout	Ballots	Elected members	Elected substitutes
Oberland	7	118	115	1st	Franz Xaver Bargetze; Franz Josef Beck; Heinrich Brunhart; Albert Schädler; Franz Schlegel; Fritz Walser	Jakob Wanger
Oberland	7	118	115	2nd	Karl Schädler	Luzius Gassner
Oberland	7	118	115	3rd	–	Egon Rheinberger
Unterland	5	74	73	1st	Franz Josef Hoop; Lorenz Kind	–
Unterland	5	74	73	2nd	Jakob Kaiser; Franz Josef Marxer	–
Unterland	5	74	73	3rd	Ludwig Elkuch	Johann Gstöhl; Franz Josef Ritter
Source: Vogt

=== Appointed by the prince ===
Appointed member	Municipality
Meinrad Ospelt	Vaduz
Alfons Feger	Vaduz
Ludwig Marxer	Schellenberg
Source: Vogt

== Aftermath ==
The first meeting of the Landtag following the elections took place on 27 October, where Albert Schädler was re-elected as President of the Landtag, with Karl Schädler as vice president.
