= 1898 Liechtenstein general election =

- 11–12 May 1898
- 12 seats in the Landtag
President of the Landtag before	President of the Landtag after
Albert Schädler; Independent	Albert Schädler; Independent

General elections were held in Liechtenstein on 11 and 12 May 1898 to elect 12 of the 15 members of the Landtag. The twelve seats were indirectly elected by electors selected by voters in two constituencies, Oberland and Unterland, while the remaining three were appointed by Johann II, Prince of Liechtenstein.

== Background ==
The Landtag's term was characterized by a dispute between the Landtag and governor Friedrich Stellwag von Carion over the interpretation of the constitution in regards to publish resolutions from the Landtag in the newspaper Liechtensteiner Volksblatt without approval from the governor. From September 1894, Carion ordered the Volksblatt to not publish communications from the Landtag, arguing that it fell under the sole responsibility of the government.

The dispute became a full conflict between Carion and the Landtag in July 1895, leading to Johann II, Prince of Liechtenstein adjourning the Landtag the following month. The prince sent former governor Carl von In der Maur to Liechtenstein where he was able to facilitate a compromise between Carion and the Landtag in a return to the status quo — the minutes of the Landtag would be published by mutual agreement.

== Electors ==
Electors were selected through elections that were held between 28 April and 93 May in two electoral districts, Oberland and Unterland; they elected 118 and 74 electors respectively. Each municipality had two electors for every 100 inhabitants. All male citizens aged 24 and above were eligible to vote.

Municipality	Electors	+/–
Balzers	26	0
Eschen	22	0
Gamprin	8	0
Mauren	22	0
Planken	2	0
Ruggell	12	0
Schaan	22	0
Schellenberg	10	0
Triesen	22	0
Triesenberg	24	0
Vaduz	22	0
Total	192	0
Source: Vogt

== Results ==
The election of Oberland's Landtag members and their deputies was held on 11 May in Vaduz. All but one of Oberland's 118 electors were present for voting; Oberland elected seven Landtag members and four deputies. The election of Unterland's Landtag members and substitutes was held on 12 May in Mauren. All 74 of Unterland's electors were present for voting; Unterland elected five Landtag members and one deputy.

The Landtag members and their deputies were elected in three ballots, with the remaining three being appointed by Johann II on 20 May. There were no political parties and the election of members was almost entirely focused on an individual's personality.

Electoral district	Seats	Electors	Turnout	Ballots	Elected members	Elected substitutes
Oberland	7	118	117	1st	Franz Xaver Bargetze; Franz Josef Beck; Heinrich Brunhart; Johann Baptist Büchel; Albert Schädler; Karl Schädler; Ferdinand Walser	–
Oberland	7	118	117	2nd	–	Franz Josef Biedermann
Oberland	7	118	117	3rd	–	Joachim Beck; Josef Frommelt; Meinrad Ospelt
Unterland	5	74	74	1st	Chrisostomus Büchel; Wilhelm Fehr; Jakob Kaiser; Lorenz Kind; Ludwig Marxer	Gebhard Schädler
Unterland	5	74	74	2nd	–	–
Unterland	5	74	74	3rd	–	–
Source: Vogt

Franz Xaver Bargetze did not accept his election, thus Meinrad Ospelt was substituted in as a full member. Franz Josef Biedermann also declined his election as a deputy member.

=== Appointed by the prince ===
Appointed member	Municipality
Meinrad Ospelt	Vaduz
Josef Beck	Schaan
Franz Josef Biedermann	Schellenberg
Source: Vogt

== Aftermath ==
The first meeting of the Landtag following the elections took place on 31 May, where Albert Schädler was re-elected as President of the Landtag, with Johann Baptist Büchel as vice president.
