= 1894 Liechtenstein general election =

- 16–17 May 1894
- 12 seats in the Landtag
President of the Landtag before	President of the Landtag after
Albert Schädler; Independent	Albert Schädler; Independent

General elections were held in Liechtenstein on 16 and 17 May 1894 to elect 12 of the 15 members of the Landtag. The twelve seats were indirectly elected by electors selected by voters in two constituencies, Oberland and Unterland, while the remaining three were appointed by Johann II, Prince of Liechtenstein.

== Background ==
Since the 1890 elections, member Franz Josef Kind died in office and was succeeded by Wilhelm Fehr in 1891. In addition, Peter Rheinberger died in office in 1893 and was succeeded by Rudolf Quaderer.

The Landtag's term was characterized by passing laws such as procedures for enforcement of foreign court rulings in Liechtenstein in 1891, abolishing imprisonment for debt in 1892, and reducing the interest rates for rural funds and trusts in February 1894.

== Electors ==
Electors were selected through elections that were held between 4 and 9 May in two electoral districts, Oberland and Unterland; they elected 118 and 74 electors respectively. Each municipality had two electors for every 100 inhabitants. All male citizens aged 24 and above were eligible to vote.

Municipality	Electors	+/–
Balzers	26	+2
Eschen	22	+2
Gamprin	8	0
Mauren	22	+2
Planken	2	0
Ruggell	12	0
Schaan	22	0
Schellenberg	10	+2
Triesen	22	–2
Triesenberg	24	+2
Vaduz	22	+2
Total	192	+12
Source: Vogt

== Results ==
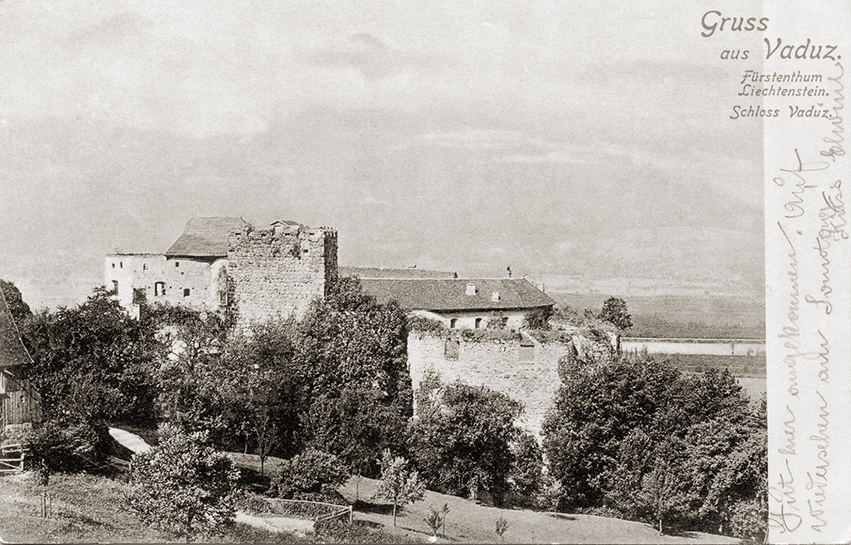
Vaduz Castle was the meeting place of the Oberland's electors

The election of Oberland's Landtag members and their deputies was held on 16 May in Vaduz Castle. All 114 of Oberland's electors were present for voting; Oberland elected seven Landtag members and three deputies. The election of Unterland's Landtag members and substitutes was held on 17 May in Mauren. All but one of Unterland's 74 voters were present for voting; Unterland elected five Landtag members and two deputies.

The Landtag members and their deputies were elected in three ballots, with the remaining three being appointed by Johann II, Prince of Liechtenstein on 21 May. There were no political parties and the election of members was almost entirely focused on an individual's personality.

Electoral district	Seats	Electors	Turnout	Ballots	Elected members	Elected substitutes
Oberland	7	118	114	1st	Franz Xaver Bargetze; Franz Josef Beck; Christian Brunhart; Albert Schädler; Karl Schädler; Ferdinand Walser	–
Oberland	7	118	114	2nd	–	Franz Josef Kind; Franz Schlegel
Oberland	7	118	114	3rd	Johann Baptist Büchel	Rudolf Quaderer
Unterland	5	74	73	1st	Chrisostomus Büchel; Wilhelm Fehr; Jakob Kaiser; Lorenz Kind; Ludwig Marxer	Gebhard Schädler
Unterland	5	74	73	2nd	–	–
Unterland	5	74	73	3rd	–	Rudolf Ignaz Öhri
Source: Vogt

=== Appointed by the prince ===
Appointed member	Municipality
Wilhelm Schlegel	Vaduz
Josef Beck	Schaan
Franz Josef Biedermann	Schellenberg
Source: Vogt

== Aftermath ==
The first meeting of the Landtag following the elections took place on 31 May, where Albert Schädler was re-elected as President of the Landtag, with Franz Xaver Bargetze as vice president.
