= 1902 Liechtenstein general election =

- 3–4 September 1902
- 12 seats in the Landtag
President of the Landtag before	President of the Landtag after
Albert Schädler; Independent	Albert Schädler; Independent

General elections were held in Liechtenstein on 3 and 4 September 1902 to elect 12 of the 15 members of the Landtag. The twelve seats were indirectly elected by electors selected by voters in two constituencies, Oberland and Unterland, while the remaining three were appointed by Johann II, Prince of Liechtenstein.

== Background ==
Since the 1898 elections, princely-appointed member Wilhelm Schlegel died in office in 1901 and was succeeded by Jakob Wanger.

The Landtag's term was characterized by passing laws such as regulating salaries for state employees in 1899, the adoption of the Austro-Hungarian krone as Liechtenstein's sole currency in 1900, and provisions for the administration of Liechtenstein's poor relief fund the same year.

== Electors ==
Electors were selected through elections that were held between 25 and 28 August in two electoral districts, Oberland and Unterland; they elected 118 and 74 electors respectively. Each municipality had two electors for every 100 inhabitants. All male citizens aged 24 and above were eligible to vote.

Municipality	Electors	+/–
Balzers	26	0
Eschen	22	0
Gamprin	8	0
Mauren	22	0
Planken	2	0
Ruggell	12	0
Schaan	22	0
Schellenberg	10	0
Triesen	22	0
Triesenberg	24	0
Vaduz	22	0
Total	192	0
Source: Vogt

== Results ==
The election of Oberland's Landtag members and their deputies was held on 3 September in Vaduz. All but one of Oberland's 118 electors were present for voting; Oberland elected seven Landtag members and three deputies. The election of Unterland's Landtag members and substitutes was held on 4 September in Mauren. All 74 of Unterland's electors were present for voting; Unterland elected five Landtag members and two deputies.

The Landtag members and their deputies were elected in three ballots, with the remaining three being appointed by Johann II, Prince of Liechtenstein on 21 September. There were no political parties and the election of members was almost entirely focused on an individual's personality.

Electoral district	Seats	Electors	Turnout	Ballots	Elected members	Elected substitutes
Oberland	7	118	117	1st	Heinrich Brunhart; Johann Baptist Büchel; Albert Schädler; Karl Schädler	Alfons Brunhart; Jakob Kaiser
Oberland	7	118	117	2nd	Franz Josef Beck	–
Oberland	7	118	117	3rd	Jakob Falk; Franz Schlegel	Egon Rheinberger
Unterland	5	74	74	1st	Ludwig Elkuch; Johann Gstöhl; Franz Josef Hoop; Lorenz Kind	Andreas Heeb
Unterland	5	74	74	2nd	–	Xaver Kindle
Unterland	5	74	74	3rd	Wilhelm Fehr	–
Source: Vogt

=== Appointed by the prince ===
Appointed member	Municipality
Wilhelm Schlegel	Vaduz
Alfons Feger	Vaduz
Jakob Kaiser	Schellenberg
Source: Vogt

== Aftermath ==
The first meeting of the Landtag following the elections took place on 27 October, where Albert Schädler was re-elected as President of the Landtag, with Johann Baptist Büchel as vice president.
