= 1906 Liechtenstein local elections =

- January 1906

Local elections were held in Liechtenstein in January 1906 to elect the municipal councils and the mayors of the eleven municipalities.

== Results ==
=== By municipality ===
Municipality	Elected mayor
Balzers	Heinrich Brunhart
Eschen	Johann Gstöhl
Gamprin	Adolf Matt
Mauren	Franz Josef Ritter
Planken	Josef Negele
Ruggell	Franz Josef Hoop
Schaan	Ferdinand Walser
Schellenberg	Ludwig Elkuch
Triesen	Luzius Gassner
Triesenberg	Johann Beck
Vaduz	Adolf Real
Source: Liechtensteiner Volksblatt
