= 1886 Liechtenstein general election =

- 19–20 April 1886
- 12 seats in the Landtag
President of the Landtag before	President of the Landtag after
Albert Schädler; Independent	Wilhelm Schlegel; Independent

General elections were held in Liechtenstein on 19 and 20 April 1878 to elect 12 of the 15 members of the Landtag. The twelve seats were indirectly elected by electors selected by voters in two constituencies, Oberland and Unterland, while the remaining three were appointed by Johann II, Prince of Liechtenstein.

== Background ==
Since the 1882 elections, princely-appointed Landtag member Josef Erni died in office in December 1882 and was succeeded by Johann Baptist Büchel. In addition, elected member Peter Simon Marxer died in office in 1885 and was succeeded by Johann Gstöhl.

The Landtag's term was characterized by passing laws such as partial amendments to the provisions of stamp patenting in 1883 and taxation for judicial proceedings in 1884.

== Electors ==
Electors were selected through elections that were held between 6 and 10 April in two electoral districts, Oberland and Unterland; they elected 114 and 68 electors respectively. Each municipality had two electors for every 100 inhabitants. All male citizens aged 24 and above were eligible to vote.

Municipality	Electors	+/–
Balzers	24	0
Eschen	20	0
Gamprin	8	0
Mauren	20	0
Planken	2	0
Ruggell	12	0
Schaan	22	0
Schellenberg	8	0
Triesen	24	0
Triesenberg	22	0
Vaduz	20	0
Total	182	0
Source: Vogt

== Results ==
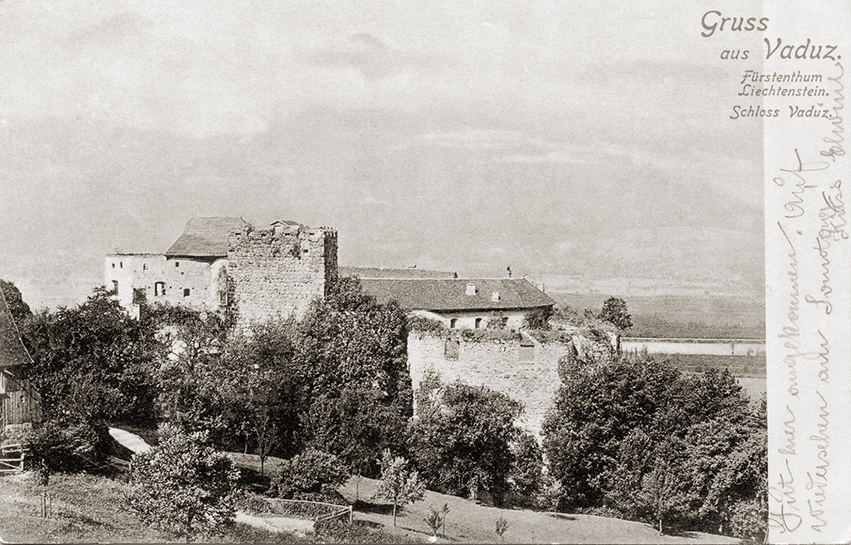
Vaduz Castle was the meeting place of the Oberland's electors

The election of Oberland's Landtag members and their deputies was held on 19 April in Vaduz Castle. Of Oberland's 114 electors, 112 were present for the voting; Oberland elected seven Landtag members and four deputies. The election of Unterland's Landtag members and substitutes was held on 20 April in Mauren. All but one of Unterland's 68 electors were present for voting; Unterland elected five Landtag members and two deputies.

The Landtag members and their deputies were elected in three ballots, with the remaining three being appointed by Johann II, Prince of Liechtenstein on 10 May. There were no political parties and the election of members was almost entirely focused on an individual's personality.

Electoral district	Seats	Electors	Turnout	Ballots	Elected members	Elected substitutes
Oberland	7	114	112	1st	Franz Xaver Bargetze; Christian Brunhart; Franz Josef Beck; Albert Schädler; Christoph Wanger	Josef Tschetter
Oberland	7	114	112	2nd	Peter Rheinberger	Johann Alois Schlegel
Oberland	7	114	112	3rd	Wendelin Erni	Josef Isidor Brunhart; Meinrad Ospelt
Unterland	5	68	67	1st	Franz Josef Biedermann; Jakob Kaiser; Franz Josef Kind; Ludwig Marxer	–
Unterland	5	68	67	2nd	–	Wilhelm Fehr
Unterland	5	68	67	3rd	Chrisostomus Büchel	Johann Gstöhl
Source: Vogt

Albert Schädler, Franz Xaver Bargetze, and Wendelin Erni, alongside deputies Josef Isidor Brunhart and Johann Alois Schlegel did not accept their elections. Subsequently, deputies Josef Tschetter and Meinrad Ospelt were substituted in as full members. The third seat was left vacant.

=== Appointed by the prince ===
Appointed member	Municipality
Wilhelm Schlegel	Vaduz
Josef Beck	Schaan
Johann Georg Matt	Mauren
Source: Vogt

== Aftermath ==
The first meeting of the Landtag following the elections took place on 24 May, where Wilhelm Schlegel was elected as President of the Landtag, with Christoph Wanger as vice president.
