= 1900 Liechtenstein local elections =

- March 1900

Local elections were held in Liechtenstein in March 1900 to elect the municipal councils and the mayors of the eleven municipalities.

== Results ==
=== By municipality ===
Municipality	Elected mayor
Balzers	Elias Vogt
Eschen	Rochus Schafhauser
Gamprin	Adolf Matt
Mauren	Jakob Kaiser
Planken	Josef Negele
Ruggell	Franz Josef Hoop
Schaan	Jakob Falk
Schellenberg	Ludwig Elkuch
Triesen	Franz Xaver Bargetze
Triesenberg	Franz Beck
Vaduz	Alois Seeger
Source: Liechtensteiner Volksblatt

Adolf Real and Reinold Amann declined election as mayor of Vaduz.
