= 1903 Liechtenstein local elections =

- April 1903

Local elections were held in Liechtenstein in April 1903 to elect the municipal councils and the mayors of the eleven municipalities.

== Results ==
=== By municipality ===
Municipality	Elected mayor
Balzers	Heinrich Brunhart
Eschen	Johann Gstöhl
Gamprin	Adolf Matt
Mauren	Franz Josef Ritter
Planken	Josef Negele
Ruggell	Franz Josef Hoop
Schaan	Ferdinand Walser
Schellenberg	Ludwig Elkuch
Triesen	Franz Xaver Bargetze
Triesenberg	Franz Beck
Vaduz	Adolf Real
Source: Liechtensteiner Volksblatt
