= 1894 Liechtenstein local elections =

- March 1894

Local elections were held in Liechtenstein in March 1894 to elect the municipal councils and the mayors of the eleven municipalities.

== Results ==
=== By municipality ===
Municipality	Elected mayor
Balzers	Josef Isidor Brunhart
Eschen	Ludwig Marxer
Gamprin	Lorenz Kind
Mauren	Jakob Kaiser
Planken	Josef Negele
Ruggell	Chrysostomus Büchel
Schaan	Ferdinand Walser
Schellenberg	Ludwig Elkuch
Triesen	Franz Xaver Bargetze
Triesenberg	Franz Beck
Vaduz	Reinold Amann
Source: Liechtensteiner Volksblatt
