= 1897 Liechtenstein local elections =

- March 1897

Local elections were held in Liechtenstein in March 1897 to elect the municipal councils and the mayors of the eleven municipalities.

== Results ==
=== By municipality ===
| Municipality | Elected mayor |
|---|---|
| Balzers | Heinrich Brunhart |
| Eschen | Ludwig Marxer |
| Gamprin | Lorenz Kind |
| Mauren | Medard Ritter |
| Planken | Gebhard Gantner |
| Ruggell | Chrysostomus Büchel |
| Schaan | Ferdinand Walser |
| Schellenberg | Ludwig Elkuch |
| Triesen | Andreas Banzer |
| Triesenberg | Joachim Beck |
| Vaduz | Adolf Real |
Source: Liechtensteiner Volksblatt
