= 1890 Liechtenstein general election =

- 12 and 16 April 1890
- 12 seats in the Landtag
President of the Landtag before	President of the Landtag after
Wilhelm Schlegel; Independent	Albert Schädler; Independent

General elections were held in Liechtenstein on 12 and 16 April 1890 to elect 12 of the 15 members of the Landtag. The twelve seats were indirectly elected by electors selected by voters in two constituencies, Oberland and Unterland, while the remaining three were appointed by Johann II, Prince of Liechtenstein.

== Background ==
The Landtag's term was characterized by passing laws such as expropriation procedures in 1887, taxation reforms for factories the same year, and pensions for civil servants in 1888.

== Electors ==
Electors were selected through elections that were held between 28 March and 3 April in two electoral districts, Oberland and Unterland; they elected 114 and 68 electors respectively. Each municipality had two electors for every 100 inhabitants. All male citizens aged 24 and above were eligible to vote.

Municipality	Electors	+/–
Balzers	24	0
Eschen	20	0
Gamprin	8	0
Mauren	20	0
Planken	2	0
Ruggell	12	0
Schaan	22	0
Schellenberg	8	0
Triesen	24	0
Triesenberg	22	0
Vaduz	20	0
Total	182	0
Source: Vogt

== Results ==
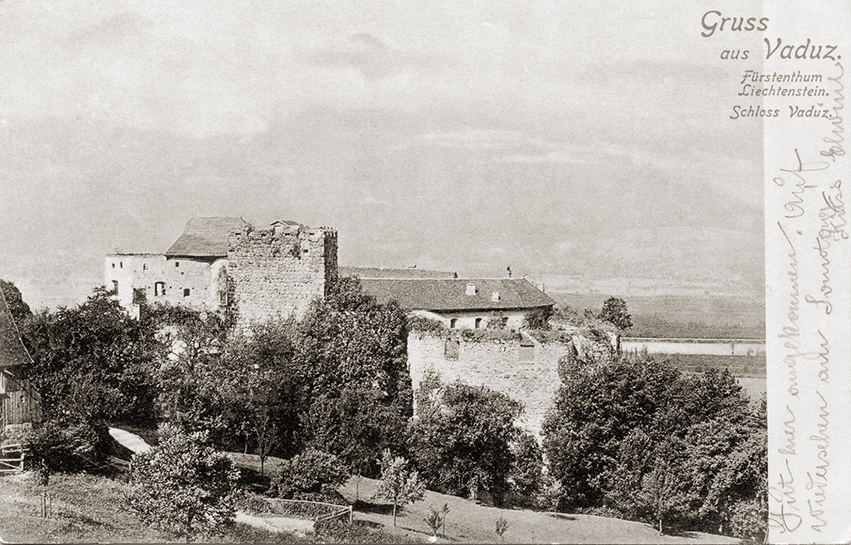
Vaduz Castle was the meeting place of the Oberland's electors

The election of Oberland's Landtag members and their deputies was held on 12 April in Vaduz Castle. All but one of Unterland's 114 voters were present for the voting; Oberland elected seven Landtag members and three deputies. The election of Unterland's Landtag members and substitutes was held on 20 April in Mauren. All 68 of Unterland's electors were present for voting; Unterland elected five Landtag members and two deputies.

The Landtag members and their deputies were elected in three ballots, with the remaining three being appointed by Johann II, Prince of Liechtenstein on 5 May. There were no political parties and the election of members was almost entirely focused on an individual's personality.

Electoral district	Seats	Electors	Turnout	Ballots	Elected members	Elected substitutes
Oberland	7	114	113	1st	Franz Xaver Bargetze; Albert Schädler	Rudolf Quaderer
Oberland	7	114	113	2nd	Meinrad Ospelt; Peter Rheinberger	Christian Brunhart; Christoph Wanger
Oberland	7	114	113	3rd	Franz Josef Beck; Josef Isidor Brunhart; Johann Baptist Büchel	–
Unterland	5	68	68	1st	Franz Josef Biedermann; Chrisostomus Büchel; Franz Josef Kind; Ludwig Marxer	Wilhelm Fehr
Unterland	5	68	68	2nd	Jakob Kaiser	Lorenz Kind
Unterland	5	68	68	3rd	–	–
Source: Vogt

=== Appointed by the prince ===
Appointed member	Municipality
Wilhelm Schlegel	Vaduz
Christoph Wanger	Schaan
Rudolf Ignaz Öhri	Ruggell
Source: Vogt

== Aftermath ==
The first meeting of the Landtag following the elections took place on 6 June, where Albert Schädler was elected as President of the Landtag, with Christoph Wanger as vice president.
