= Gustav Ospelt =

Gustav Ospelt may refer to:

- Gustav Ospelt (politician, born 1877) (1877–1934), Liechtenstein entrepreneur and politician
- Gustav Ospelt (politician, born 1906) (1906–1990), Liechtenstein entrepreneur and politician
