= 1909 Liechtenstein local elections =

- May 1909

Local elections were held in Liechtenstein in May 1909 to elect the municipal councils and the mayors of the eleven municipalities.

== Results ==
=== By municipality ===
Municipality	Elected mayor
Balzers	Heinrich Brunhart
Eschen	Johann Gstöhl
Gamprin	Johann Hasler
Mauren	Emil Batliner
Planken	Lorenz Gantner
Ruggell	Franz Josef Hoop
Schaan	Fritz Walser
Schellenberg	Andreas Hassler
Triesen	Luzius Gassner
Triesenberg	Franz Beck
Vaduz	Franz Wachter
Source: Liechtensteiner Volksblatt
