= 1912 Liechtenstein local elections =

- May 1912

Local elections were held in Liechtenstein in May 1912 to elect the municipal councils and the mayors of the eleven municipalities.

== Results ==
=== By municipality ===
Municipality	Elected mayor
Balzers	Emil Wolfinger
Eschen	Josef Marxer
Gamprin	Johann Hasler
Mauren	Emil Batliner
Planken	Josef Negele
Ruggell	August Büchel
Schaan	Josef Beck
Schellenberg	Andreas Hassler
Triesen	Luzius Gassner
Triesenberg	Johann Beck
Vaduz	Adolf Real
Source: Liechtensteiner Volksblatt
