= Josef Gassner (politician, born 1873) =

Liechtenstein politician (1873–1943)

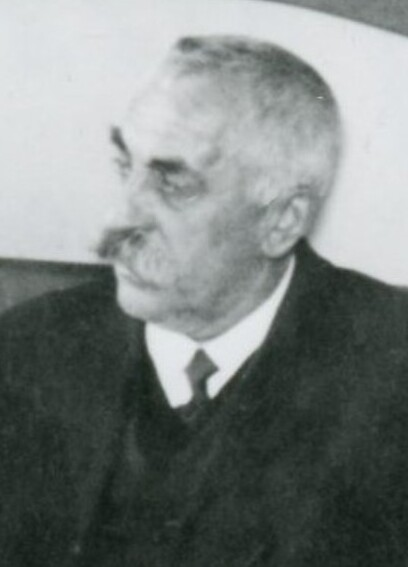
- Gassner in 1928

Liechtenstein government councillor
- In office 9 June 1873 – 18 March 1932
- Prime Minister: Prince Alfred of Liechtenstein; Josef Hoop

Mayor of Vaduz
- In office 1921–1927
- Deputy: Anton Walser
- Preceded by: Gustav Ospelt
- Succeeded by: Bernhard Risch

Personal details
- Born: 5 October 1879 Vaduz, Liechtenstein
- Died: 11 December 1943 (aged 70) Vaduz, Liechtenstein
- Party: Progressive Citizens' Party
- Spouse: Albertina Wolf (m. 1901)
- Children: 3

Josef Gassner (9 June 1873 – 11 December 1943) was a farmer and politician from Liechtenstein who served as a government councillor from 1928 to 1932. A member of the Progressive Citizens' Party (FBP), he previously served as mayor of Vaduz from 1921 to 1927.

== Life ==
Gassner was born on 9 June 1873 in Vaduz as the son of his father by the same name and Franziska (née Boss) as one of two children. He attended school in the municipality and worked as a farmer. He was also a forest ranger in Vaduz from 1900 to 1920. He was a long-time member of the Vaduz church choir.

He was a member of the Vaduz municipal council from 1906 to 1912 and again from 1915 to 1921. He was the mayor of the municipality from 1921 to 1927 as a member of the Progressive Citizens' Party (FBP). During this time, the villa district designed by Ernst Sommerlad and Erwin Hinderer began construction in 1926. In 1924, Gassner was nominated as mayor by the Christian-Social People's Party(VP), but was again a member of the FBP by 1928. He unsuccessfully ran for a seat in the Landtag of Liechtenstein in 1922.

Following the 1928 embezzlement scandal, Gassner was appointed as a government councillor initially under the acting government of Prince Alfred of Liechtenstein and then under the government of Josef Hoop, where he served until 1932.

Gassner married Albertina Wolf (28 August 1875 – 13 January 1962) on 11 February 1901 and they had three children together. He died of an illness on 11 December 1943, aged 70.
