= 1915 Liechtenstein local elections =

- May 1915

Local elections were held in Liechtenstein in May 1915 to elect the municipal councils and the mayors of the eleven municipalities.

== Results ==
=== By municipality ===
Municipality	Elected mayor
Balzers	Emil Wolfinger
Eschen	Josef Marxer
Gamprin	Felix Gubelmann
Mauren	Emil Batliner
Planken	Josef Negele
Ruggell	August Büchel
Schaan	Fritz Walser
Schellenberg	Karl Kaiser
Triesen	Luzius Gassner
Triesenberg	Josef Gassner
Vaduz	Adolf Real
Source: Liechtensteiner Volksblatt
