= Gustav Ospelt (politician, born 1877) =

Liechtenstein entrepreneur and politician (1877–1934)

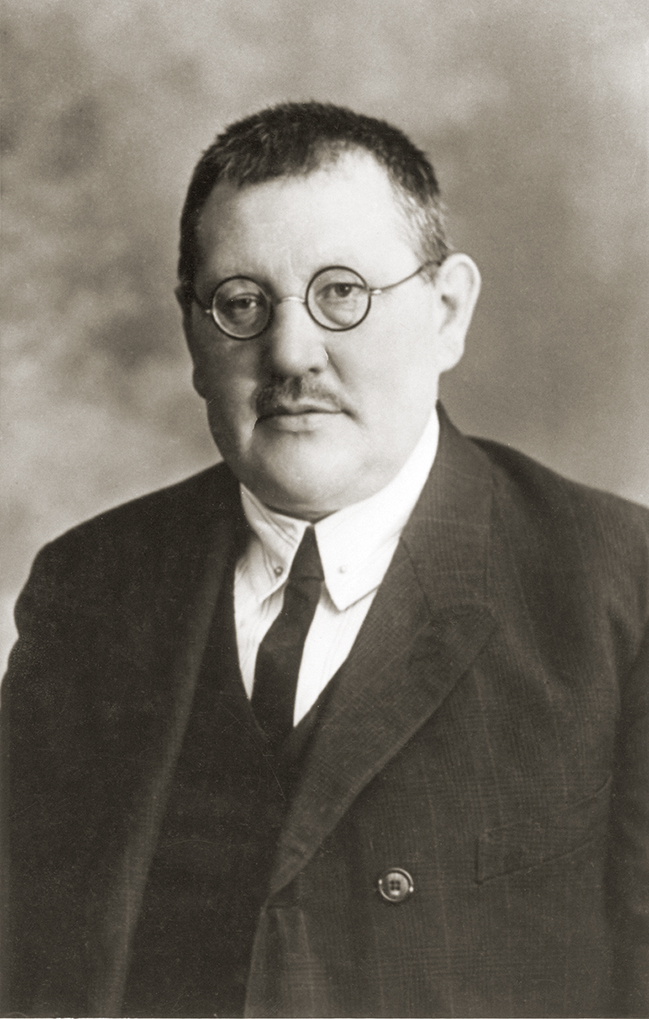

Member of the Landtag of Liechtenstein for Oberland
- In office 15 July 1928 – 1930

Mayor of Vaduz
- In office 1916–1921
- Preceded by: Adolf Real
- Succeeded by: Josef Gassner

Personal details
- Born: 6 August 1877 Vaduz, Liechtenstein
- Died: 16 August 1934 (aged 57) Vaduz, Liechtenstein
- Party: Christian-Social People's Party; Progressive Citizens' Party (1918–first half of 1920s)
- Spouse: Berta Laternser (m. 1900)
- Children: 4, including Gustav Ospelt

Gustav Ospelt (6 August 1877 – 16 August 1934) was an entrepreneur and politician from Liechtenstein who served in the Landtag of Liechtenstein from 1928 to 1930. He was previously the mayor of Vaduz from 1916 to 1921.

== Life ==
Ospelt was born on 6 August 1877 in Vaduz as the son of locksmith Christoph Ospelt and Sophie (née Konrad) as one of three children. He worked as a locksmith and farmer. In 1897, he took over his father's metalworking business, which he expanded.

He was a member of the Vaduz municipal council from 1909 to 1916 and was deputy mayor of the municipality from 1915 to 1916. Following the death of mayor Adolf Real in 1916, Ospelt was elected as to the position, which he served until 1921. During this time, he was a proponent for cultivating the Rhine meadows to lessen the food shortages created during World War I. He was also a judge at the regional, state and criminal courts. He was again a member of the Vaduz municipal council from 1921 to 1930.

Ospelt was a founding member of the Progressive Citizens' Party (FBP) in 1918, but switched to the Christian-Social People's Party (VP) in the first half of the 1920s due to disagreements regarding Liechtenstein's alignment to Switzerland. He was a member of the Landtag of Liechtenstein from 1928 to 1930, and also the vice president of the Landtag during this time. Along with the other VP members of the Landtag, he resigned in 1930 due to disagreements with the FBP regarding the length of the mandate following the 1928 elections. He was on the membership list of the Liechtenstein Homeland Service (LHD) in 1933.

== Personal life ==
Ospelt married Berta Laternser (16 October 1879 – 6 December 1967) on 19 November 1900 and they had four children together. He died of a heart attack on 16 August 1934 in Vaduz, aged 57. His son Gustav Ospelt took over his company and expanded it into an international manufacturing that would become Hoval.

== Bibliography ==
- Vogt, Paul (1987). 125 Jahre Landtag (in German). Vaduz: Landtag of the Principality of Liechtenstein.
- Geiger, Peter (1997). Liechtenstein in den Dreissigerjahren 1928–1939 [Liechtenstein in the 1930s 1928–1939] (in German). Vol. 1. Zürich: Liechtenstein Institute. ISBN 3-906393-28-3.
