= Peter Simon Marxer =

Liechtenstein physician and politician (1850–1885)

Vice President of the Landtag of Liechtenstein
- In office 25 May 1882 – 5 June 1885
- President: Albert Schädler
- Preceded by: Christoph Wanger
- Succeeded by: Johann Baptist Büchel

Member of the Landtag of Liechtenstein for Oberland
- In office 2 May 1882 – 5 June 1885
- Succeeded by: Johann Gstöhl

Personal details
- Born: 3 May 1850 Gamprin, Liechtenstein
- Died: 5 June 1885 (aged 35) Gamprin, Liechtenstein

Peter Simon Marxer (3 May 1850 – 5 June 1885) was a physician and politician from Liechtenstein who served in the Landtag of Liechtenstein and as the Vice President of the Landtag of Liechtenstein from 1882 until his death in 1885.

== Life ==
Marxer was born on 3 May 1850 in Gamprin as the son of Johann Georg Marxer and Katharina (née Heeb) as one of seven children. He attended grammar school in Feldkirch and then Einsiedeln until 1870. From there, he parents wished for Marxer to become a priest, but instead he enrolled at Faculty of Medicine at the University of Innsbruck, being the first Liechtensteiner to do so. He received a doctorate in medicine in 1876, then ran a medical practice in Gamprin. He was considered a well-respected physician; in 1883, he was appointed as the regional physician in the Austrian region of Montafon, but he did not take this post presumably for health reasons.

Marxer was a member of the Landtag of Liechtenstein from 1882 until his death in 1885, and was vice president of the Landtag during this time. Additionally, he was a member of the Landtag's finance and provincial committees. During his time in the Landtag, Marxer opposed a proposal for a railway to connect Sargans, Switzerland through the municipality of Balzers to Schaan. Additionally, he also opposed a previous decentralisation policy adopted by the Landtag regarding the building of a hospital and poor house in Liechtenstein. He was succeeded by Johann Gstöhl as a Landtag member, and by Johann Baptist Büchel as vice president.

Suffering from poor health, Marxer died on 5 June 1885 of chronic kidney disease and tuberculosis, aged 35. In his will, he bequeathed money to the parish church of Eschen, and that of Ruggell. In addition, he bequeathed money and land to build an orphanage, stipulating that construction must have began within ten years. This did not happen, however, and the money instead went towards the construction of the parish church of Ruggell.
