= Josef Gassner =

Josef Gassner may refer to:

- Josef Gassner (skier) (born 1944), Liechtenstein skier
- Josef Gassner (politician, born 1831) (1831–1879), mayor of Triesenberg
- Josef Gassner (politician, born 1873) (1873–1943), Liechtenstein government councillor
- Josef Gassner (politician, born 1876) (1876–1951), member of the Landtag of Liechtenstein
