= Alois Seeger =

Mayor of Vaduz from 1900 to 1903

Mayor of Vaduz
- In office 1900–1903
- Preceded by: Adolf Real
- Succeeded by: Adolf Real

Personal details
- Born: 20 May 1868 Vaduz, Liechtenstein
- Died: 17 August 1931 (aged 63) Schaan, Liechtenstein
- Spouse: Bertha Real (m. 1897)
- Relations: Felix Real (father-in-law); Adolf Real (brother-in-law)
- Children: 5

Alois Seeger (20 May 1868 – 17 August 1931) was a businessman, firefighter and politician from Liechtenstein who served as the mayor of Vaduz from 1900 to 1903.

== Life ==
Seeger was born on 20 May 1868 in Vaduz as the son of innkeeper Franz Josef Seeger and Maria Juliana (née Beck) as one of five children. He was the inkeeper of the Bierhaus inn in Vaduz until 1918, which he had taken over from his father. He also ran postal services from Vaduz to Schaan and then later from Vaduz to Balzers. He was captain of the Vaduz fire department from 1896 to 1901.

He was elected the mayor of Vaduz in 1900, where he served until 1903. During this time, he was involved in the construction of Liechtenstein's first public power plant in 1901. He was a member of the Vaduz school board.

He the treasurer of the Liechtenstein Fire Department Association from 1898 to 1906 and president of the Harmoniemusik Vaduz from 1903 to 1909.

Seeger married Bertha Real (22 May 1872 – 8 December 1947), the daughter of Felix Real and sister of Adolf Real (both of whom also served as mayor of Vaduz), on 3 May 1897 and they had five children together. He died on 17 August 1931 in Schaan, aged 63.
