= Sarojahöhe =

Eastern Alpine mountain on Austria-Liechtenstein border

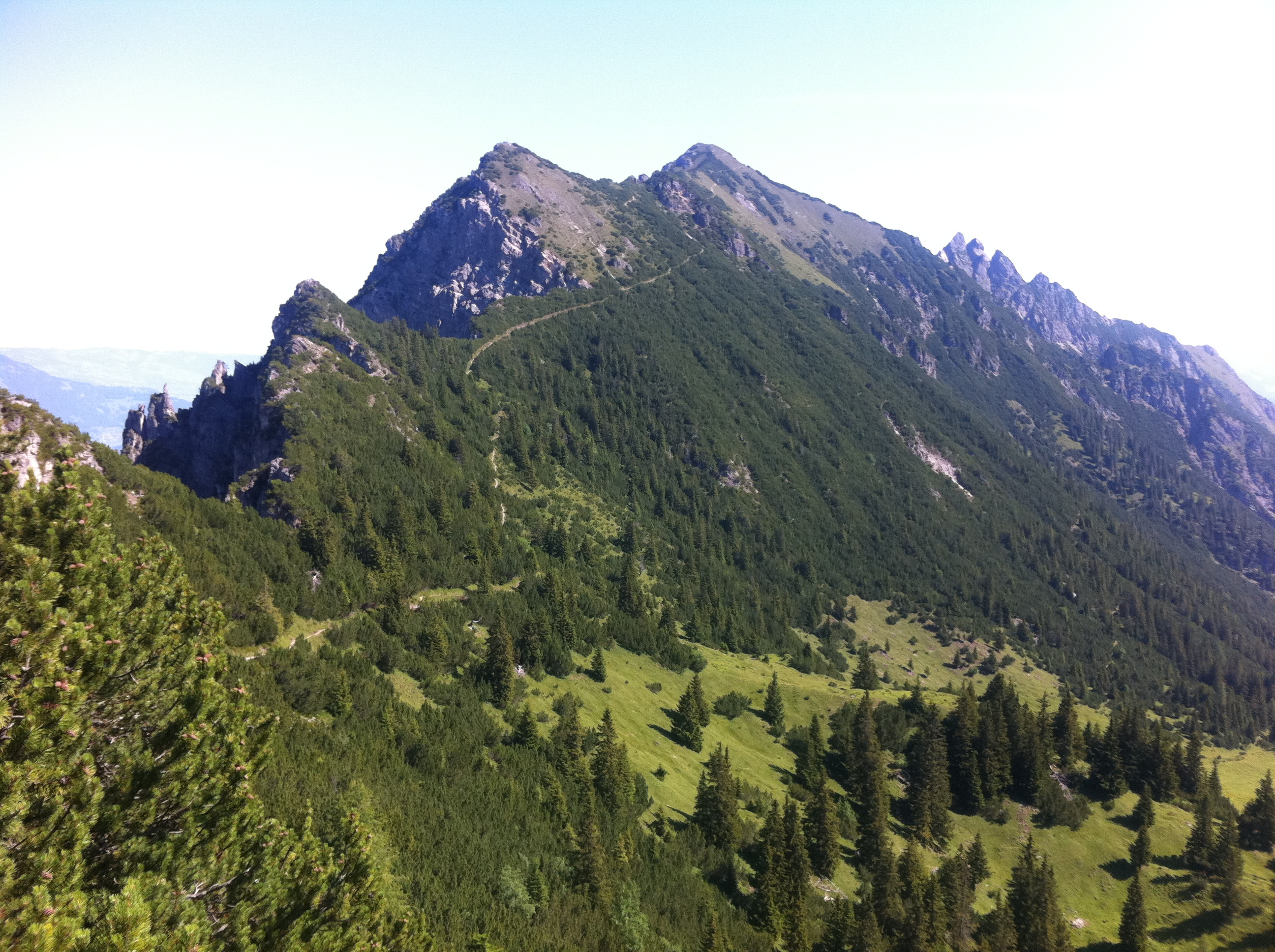
- View from near the peak of Saroja of the Fürstensteig route going past Sattelspitz to Drei Schwestern with Gafleispitze in the distance.

Highest point
- Elevation: 1,659 m (5,443 ft)
- Coordinates: 47°11′27″N 9°34′21″E

Geography
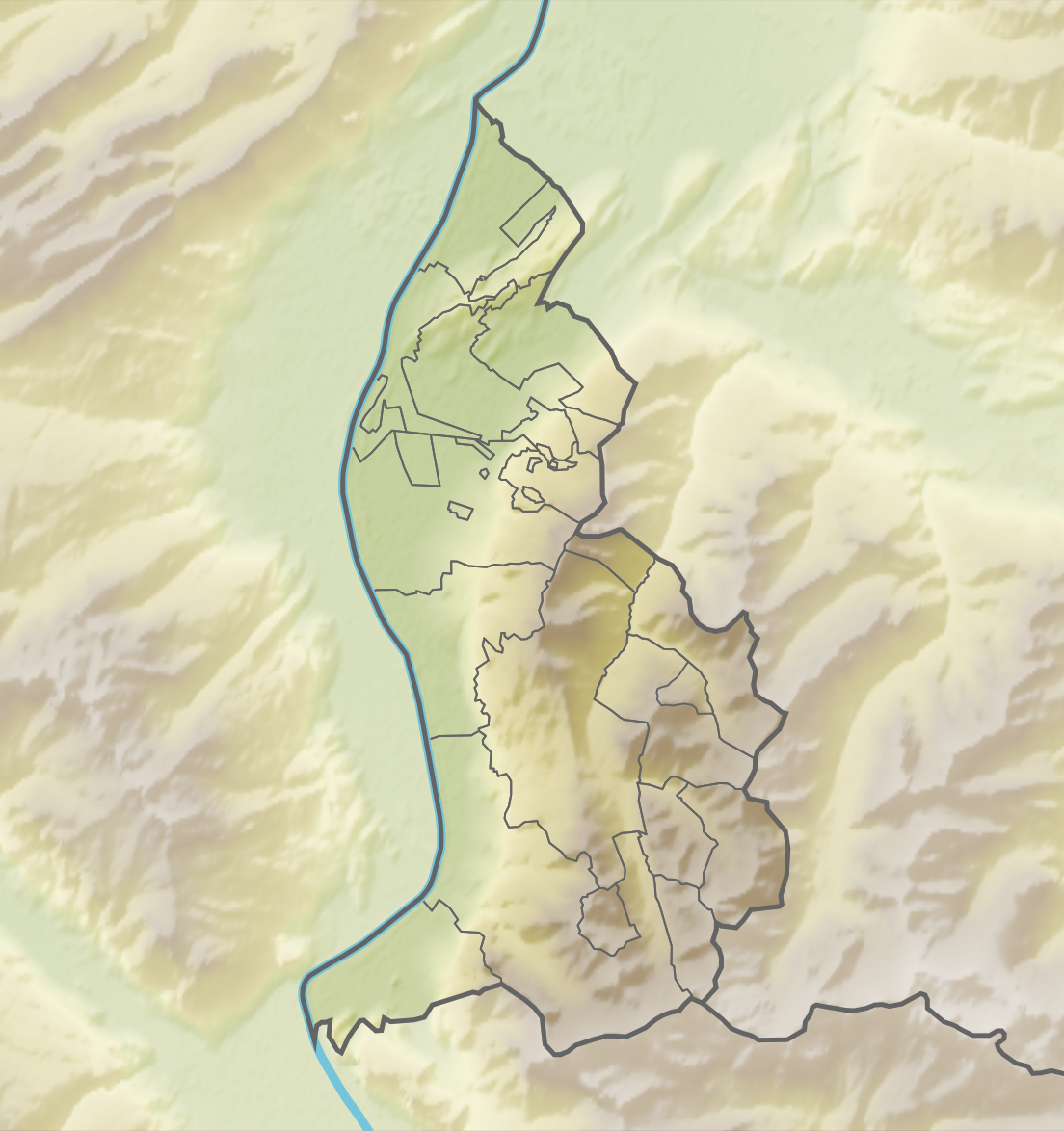
- Location within Liechtenstein
- Location: Liechtenstein / Austria
- Parent range: Rätikon, Alps

Sarojahöhe or Saroja is a mountain on the border of Liechtenstein and Austria in the Rätikon range of the Eastern Alps to the east of the village of Planken, with a height of 1,659 metres (5,443 ft).
