= 1885 Liechtenstein local elections =

- February 1885

Local elections were held in Liechtenstein in February 1885 to elect the municipal councils and the mayors of the eleven municipalities.

== Results ==
=== By municipality ===
Municipality	Elected mayor
Balzers	Christian Brunhart
Eschen	Johann Gstöhl
Gamprin	Lorenz Kind
Mauren	Jakob Kaiser
Planken	Peter Beck
Ruggell	Chrysostomus Büchel
Schaan	Josef Tschetter
Schellenberg	Elias Oehri
Triesen	Wendelin Erni
Triesenberg	Franz Beck
Vaduz	Meinrad Ospelt
Source: Liechtensteiner Volksblatt
