= Gustav Ospelt (politician, born 1906) =

Liechtenstein entrepreneur and politician (1906–1990)

Member of the Landtag of Liechtenstein for Oberland
- In office 6 February 1966 – 1 February 1970

Personal details
- Born: 1 August 1908 Vaduz, Liechtenstein
- Died: 13 April 1990 (aged 83) Vaduz, Liechtenstein
- Party: Progressive Citizens' Party
- Spouse: Amalia Real (m. 1939; died 1978)
- Children: 6

Gustav Ospelt (1 August 1906 – 13 April 1990) was an entrepreneur and politician from Liechtenstein who served in the Landtag of Liechtenstein from 1966 to 1970. He was the owner of Hoval, which he expanded into an international manufacturing company.

== Life ==
Ospelt was born on 1 August 1906 in Vaduz as the son of businessman and Landtag member Gustav Ospelt and Sophie (née Laternser) as one of four children. He attended secondary school in Vaduz and then conducted an apprenticeship at his father's metalworking company before attending arts and crafts school in Zurich until 1925. He worked as a construction worker and metalworking artist in Dornbirn from 1925 to 1927 before joining his father's company in 1928. After his father's death in 1934, he took over the company alongside his brother, which was renamed to Ospelt Apparatebau Aktiengesellschaft Vaduz in 1936.

From 1933 to 1939, Ospelt owned the Waldhotel Liechtensteiner Hof, alongside Ludwig Ospelt until 1934. He became the sole owner of his metalworking company after his brother took a cash pay-out in 1939. During World War II, the company, which primarily installed central heating systems and produced gasoline, suffered due to the lack of natural resources caused by the war. At the same time, Ospelt was an advocate for preserving Liechtenstein's independence while the country as under threat by Nazi Germany. He was a founding member of the Liechtenstein Homeland Service in 1933 but left shortly afterwards due to its move towards Nazism.

In 1945 his company was renamed to Hoval. The company expanded rapidly in the years after the war, during which Ospelt designed several of the companies products himself. By 1969 Hovalwek AG had subsidiaries in Austria, France, Italy and the United Kingdom, with licenses in other countries such with Krupp in Germany and in the Netherlands. In 1985, Ospelt handed over the company to his son-in-law Peter Frick.

Ospelt was a member of the Vaduz municipal council from 1942 to 1945 and again from 1951 to 1960. He was a member of the Landtag of Liechtenstein from 1966 to 1970 as a member of the Progressive Citizens' Party. During this time, he was a member of the finance and state committees. He was a co-founder and first president of the Liechtenstein Chamber of Commerce and Industry (LIHK) from 1947 to 1968, and then honorary president from 1970.

== Personal life ==
In 1978, Ospelt received an honorary doctorate from the University of Graz.

Ospelt married Amalia Real (6 December 1917 – 4 July 1978) on 7 September 1939 and they had six children together. He died on 13 April 1990 in Vaduz, aged 83.

== Bibliography ==
- Vogt, Paul (1987). 125 Jahre Landtag (in German). Vaduz: Landtag of the Principality of Liechtenstein.
