= Unterland (electoral district) =

Unterland Wahlkreis Unterland
- Electoral district of Liechtenstein
- Coordinates: 47°14′0.98″N 9°32′53.01″E
- Country: Liechtenstein
- Seat: Schellenberg
- Municipalities: 5 (Eschen, Gamprin, Mauren, Ruggell, Schellenberg)

Area
  - Total: 34.8 km^{2} (13.4 sq mi)

Population (2019)
  - Total: 13,986
- Time zone: UTC+1 (CET)
  - Summer (DST): UTC+2 (CEST)
- Area code: (+423)

Unterland (German: Wahlkreis Unterland), meaning "lower land", is one of the two electoral districts of Liechtenstein. The district's administrative seat is the town of Schellenberg, due to its historical existence as the Lordship of Schellenberg (German: Herrschaft Schellenberg). It has 10 seats in the Landtag.

== Geography ==
The district is less populous than Oberland (the other district) and takes up between a fifth and a sixth of Liechtenstein's total area. It comprises five municipalities and three villages, for a total of eight settlements.

Municipality	Pop. (2014)	Area (km^{2})	Hamlets
Eschen	4,313	10.3	Nendeln
Gamprin	1,657	6.1	Bendern
Mauren	4,189	7.5	Schaanwald
Ruggell	2,146	7.4	none
Schellenberg	1,053	3.5	Hinterschellenberg

== Members ==
=== Indirect election: 1878–1918 ===
When the district was established, its representatives were elected by a delegation of 100 electors, who themselves were elected by the citizens of the district.

Election	Member (party)	Member (party)	Member (party)	Member (party)	Member (party)
1878	Franz Josef Biedermann	Michael Kaiser	Franz Josef Kind	Josef Martin Oehri	
1882	Franz Josef Biedermann	Sebastian Heeb	Peter Marzer	Josef Martin Oehri	Jakob Kaiser
1886	Franz Josef Biedermann	Franz Josef Kind	Ludwig Marxer	Chrisostomus Büchel	Jakob Kaiser
1890	Franz Josef Biedermann	Franz Josef Kind	Ludwig Marxer	Chrisostomus Büchel	Jakob Kaiser
1894	Lorenz Kind	Wilhelm Fehr	Ludwig Marxer	Chrisostomus Büchel	Jakob Kaiser
1898	Lorenz Kind	Wilhelm Fehr	Ludwig Marxer	Chrisostomus Büchel	Jakob Kaiser
1902	Lorenz Kind	Wilhelm Fehr	Ludwid Elkuch	Johann Gstöhl	Franz Josef Hoop
1906	Lorenz Kind	Jakob Kaiser	Ludwid Elkuch	Franz Josef Marxer	Franz Josef Hoop
1910	Lorenz Kind	Jakob Kaiser	Emil Batliner	Franz Josef Marxer	Franz Josef Hoop
1914	Johann Hasler	Johann Wohlwend	Emil Batliner	Franz Josef Marxer	Franz Josef Hoop

=== Direct election: 1918–1932 ===
==== Five seats: 1918–1922 ====
Election	Member (party)	Member (party)	Member (party)	Member (party)	Member (party)
1918	Johann Hasler (FBP)	Franz Josef Hoop (FBP)	Franz Josef Marxer (FBP)	Peter Büchel (FBP)	Karl Kaiser (FBP)

==== Six seats: 1922–1932 ====
Election	Member (party)	Member (party)	Member (party)	Member (party)	Member (party)	Member (party)
1922	Felix Gubelmann (FBP)	Karl Kaiser (FBP)	Josef Ignaz Marxer (FBP)	Peter Büchel (FBP)	Johann Büchel (CSV)	Rudolf Matt (CSV)
Jan 1926	Franz Josef Marxer (FBP)	Karl Kaiser (FBP)	Franz Xaver Hoop (FBP)	Peter Büchel (FBP)	Emil Batliner (FBP)	Wilhelm Büchel (FBP)
Apr 1926	Franz Josef Marxer (FBP)	Karl Kaiser (FBP)	Franz Xaver Hoop (FBP)	Peter Büchel (FBP)	Emil Batliner (FBP)	Wilhelm Büchel (FBP)
1928	Franz Josef Marxer (FBP)	Karl Kaiser (FBP)	Franz Xaver Hoop (FBP)	Peter Büchel (FBP)	Emil Batliner (FBP)	Wilhelm Büchel (FBP)

=== 1932–1939 ===
In the 1930s, the electoral districts were abolished, and the Landtag was composed of a mixture of representatives of municipalities and members elected from a national list.

=== 1939–present: proportional representation ===
In 1939, the coalition government introduced proportional representation, bringing back the districts of Oberland and Unterland.

==== Six seats: 1939–1989 ====
Election	Member (party)	Member (party)	Member (party)	Member (party)	Member (party)	Member (party)
1939	Oswald Bühler (FBP)	Johann Georg Hasler (FBP)	Franz Xaver Hoop (FBP)	Eugen Schädler (FBP)	Rudolf Matt (VU)	Chrisostomus Öhri (VU)
1945	Philipp Elkuch (FBP)	Johann Georg Hasler (FBP)	Franz Xaver Hoop (FBP)	Eugen Schädler (FBP)	Josef Marxer (VU)	Alois Hassler (VU)
1949	Oswald Bühler (FBP)	Rudolf Marxer (FBP)	Eduard Oehri (FBP)	Eugen Schädler (FBP)	Josef Marxer (VU)	Johann Georg Hasler (VU)
Feb 1953	Oswald Bühler (FBP)	Ernst Andreas Büchel (FBP)	Franz Kind Sr. (FBP)	Eugen Schädler (FBP)	Alois Hassler (VU)	Johann Georg Hasler (VU)
Jun 1953	Oswald Bühler (FBP)	Ernst Andreas Büchel (FBP)	Franz Kind Sr. (FBP)	Eugen Schädler (FBP)	Gebhard Gerner (VU)	Paul Büchel (VU)
1957	Georg Oehri (FBP)	Ernst Büchel (FBP)	Leo Gerner (FBP)	Josef Oehri (FBP)	Alois Oehri (VU)	Johann Georg Hasler (VU)
1958	Georg Oehri (FBP)	Ernst Büchel (FBP)	Leo Gerner (FBP)	Alfons Büchel (FBP)	Alois Oehri (VU)	Paul Oehri (VU)
1962	Georg Oehri (FBP)	Ernst Büchel (FBP)	Leo Gerner (FBP)	Franz Nägele (VU)	Alois Oehri (VU)	Paul Oehri (VU)
1966	Georg Oehri (FBP)	Ernst Büchel (FBP)	Leo Gerner (FBP)	Franz Nägele (VU)	Georg Malin (FBP)	Cyrill Büchel (VU)
1970	Anton Gerner (FBP)	Ernst Büchel (FBP)	Eugen Hasler (VU)	Franz Nägele (VU)	Georg Malin (FBP)	Cyrill Büchel (VU)
1974	Anton Gerner (FBP)	Ernst Büchel (FBP)	Werner Gstöhl (VU)	Franz Nägele (VU)	Gerard Batliner (FBP)	Cyrill Büchel (VU)
1978	Armin Meier (FBP)	Ernst Büchel (FBP)	Franz Meier (VU)	Hermann Hassler (VU)	Gerard Batliner (FBP)	Walter Oehry (VU)
1982	Armin Meier (FBP)	Beat Marxer (FBP)	Franz Meier (VU)	Hermann Hassler (VU)	Josef Büchel (FBP)	Günther Wohlwend (VU)
1986	Heinz Ritter (FBP)	Emma Eigenmann-Schädler (FBP)	Beat Hassler (VU)	Hermann Hassler (VU)	Josef Büchel (FBP)	Günther Wohlwend (VU)

==== Ten seats: 1989–present ====
Election	Member (party)	Member (party)	Member (party)	Member (party)	Member (party)	Member (party)	Member (party)	Member (party)	Member (party)	Member (party)
1989	Carl Kaiser (FBP)	Otmar Hasler (FBP)	Josef Büchel (FBP)	Heinz Ritter (FBP)	Emma Eigenmann-Schädler (FBP)	Günther Wohlwend (VU)	Oswald Kranz (VU)	Manfred Biedermann (VU)	Walter Oehry (VU)	Hermann Hassler (VU)
Feb 1993	Carl Kaiser (FBP)	Otmar Hasler (FBP)	Josef Büchel (FBP)	Gabriel Marxer (FBP)	Renate Wohlwend (FBP)	Wolfgang Marxer (FL)	Oswald Kranz (VU)	Manfred Biedermann (VU)	Egon Gstöhl (VU)	Arnold Kind (VU)
Oct 1993	Rudolf Lampert (FBP)	Otmar Hasler (FBP)	Johannes Matt (FBP)	Gabriel Marxer (FBP)	Renate Wohlwend (FBP)	Otto Büchel (VU)	Oswald Kranz (VU)	Manfred Biedermann (VU)	Egon Gstöhl (VU)	Ingrid Hassler-Gerner (VU)
1997	Rudolf Lampert (FBP)	Otmar Hasler (FBP)	Johannes Matt (FBP)	Gabriel Marxer (FBP)	Egon Matt (FL)	Otto Büchel (VU)	Oswald Kranz (VU)	Donath Oehri (VU)	Hansjörg Goop (VU)	Ingrid Hassler-Gerner (VU)
2001	Rudolf Lampert (FBP)	Johannes Kaiser (FBP)	Renate Wohlwend (FBP)	Markus Büchel (FBP)	Jürgen Zech (FBP)	Otto Büchel (VU)	Helmut Büchel (FBP)	Donath Oehri (VU)	Ivo Klein (VU)	Ingrid Hassler-Gerner (VU)
2005	Rudolf Lampert (FBP)	Johannes Kaiser (FBP)	Renate Wohlwend (FBP)	Markus Büchel (FBP)	Franz J. Heeb (FBP)	Günther Kranz (VU)	Andrea Matt (FL)	Doris Beck (VU)	Ivo Klein (VU)	Marlies Amann-Marxer (VU)
2009	Gerold Büchel (FBP)	Johannes Kaiser (FBP)	Renate Wohlwend (FBP)	Manfred Batliner (FBP)	Rainer Gopp (FBP)	Günther Kranz (VU)	Werner Kranz (VU)	Doris Beck (VU)	Peter Büchel (VU)	Marlies Amann-Marxer (VU)
2013	Gerold Büchel (FBP)	Johannes Kaiser (FBP)	Elfried Hasler (FBP)	Manfred Batliner (FBP)	Wolfgang Marxer (FL)	Herbert Elkuch (DU)	Erich Hasler (DU)	Judith Öhri (VU)	Peter Büchel (VU)	Violanda Lanter-Koller (VU)
2017	Johannes Hasler (FBP)	Johannes Kaiser (FBP)	Elfried Hasler (FBP)	Daniel Oehry (FBP)	Patrick Risch (FL)	Herbert Elkuch (DU)	Erich Hasler (DU)	Mario Wohlwend (VU)	Gunilla Marxer-Kranz (VU)	Violanda Lanter-Koller (VU)
2021	Franziska Hoop (FBP)	Johannes Kaiser (FBP)	Karin Zech-Hoop (FBP)	Daniel Oehry (FBP)	Patrick Risch (FL)	Herbert Elkuch (DpL)	Peter Frick (VU)	Mario Wohlwend (VU)	Gunilla Marxer-Kranz (VU)	Dietmar Lampert (VU)
2025	Franziska Hoop (FBP)	Johannes Kaiser (FBP)	Lino Nägele (FBP)	Erich Hasler (DpL)	Sandra Fausch (FL)	Simon Schächle (DpL)	Stefan Öhri (VU)	Dietmar Hasler (VU)	Tanja Cissé (VU)	Johannes Zimmermann (VU)

== See also ==
- Oberland (electoral district)
- Landtag of Liechtenstein
- NUTS statistical regions of Liechtenstein
- Lists of electoral districts by nation
