= Samina (river) =

River of Liechtenstein and Austria

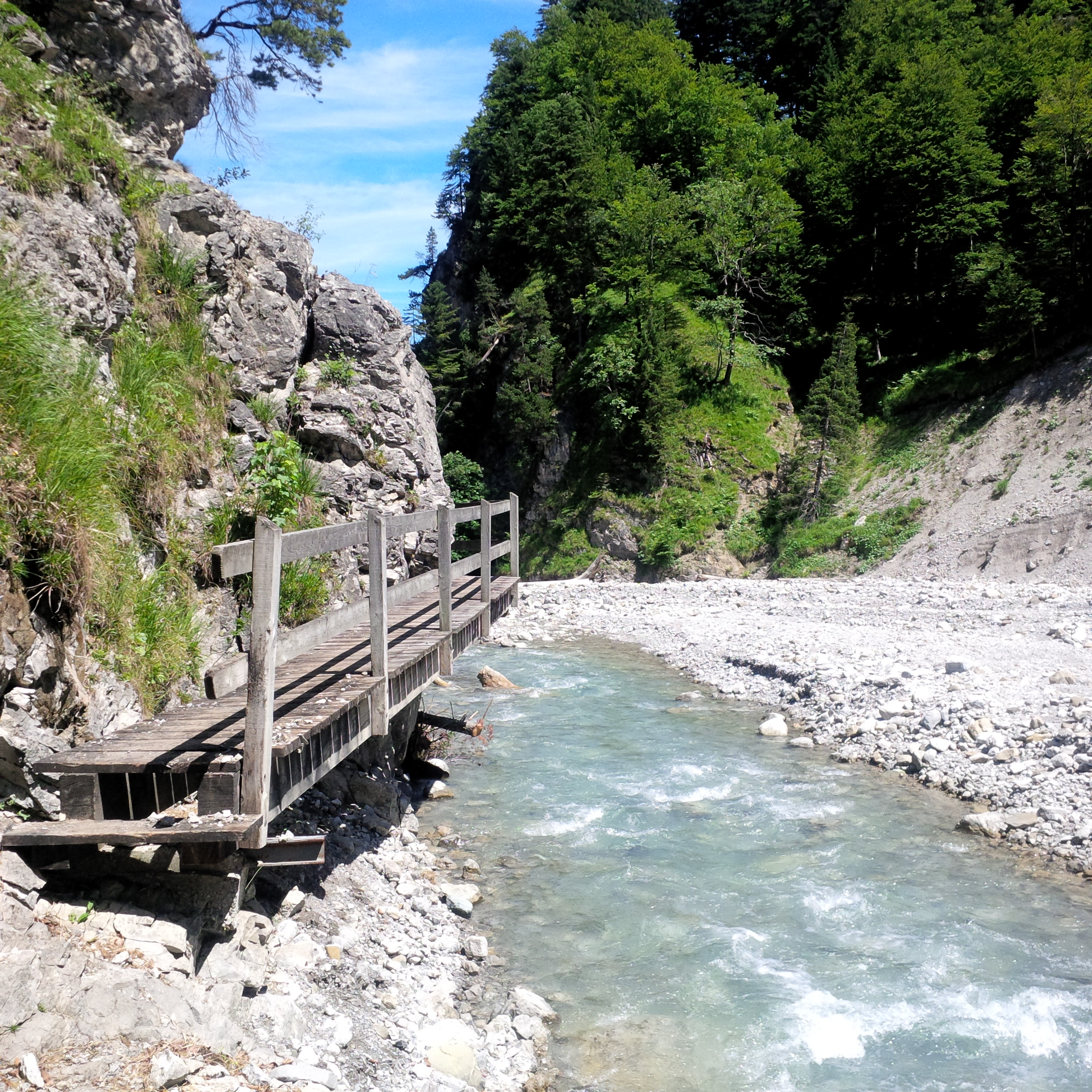

Location
- Countries: Liechtenstein and Austria

Physical characteristics
- Mouth
  - location: to Ill, in Brandnertal, Vorarlberg
  - coordinates: 47.2253°N 9.6270°E
- Length: 17 km (11 mi)

Basin features
- Progression: Ill→ Rhine→ North Sea

The Samina (also: Saminabach) is a whitewater river of Liechtenstein and Austria. It is a tributary of the Ill.

The Samina originates in Liechtenstein. In the course of time, it formed the Saminatal (Samina Valley), the most western valley of Rätikon and side valley of the Walgau. The Saminatal makes up to one third of the territory of Liechtenstein. It has a length of approximately 17 km (11 mi) (Liechtenstein: 12 km (7.5 mi) (including its source rivulets, the 2nd longest river of the principality), Austria: 5 km (3.1 mi)).

== Source and course ==
The Samina comes into existence at Ölersegg (meeting point of Triesenberg, an exclave of Schaan (Brandegg) and an exclave of Balzers), where the rivers Stägerbach and Valorschbach merge. They flow from south to north through the eastern part of Liechtenstein, the Saminatal, and then cross the border to Austria. In the community aera of Frastanz the river merges with the Ill.

== Use ==
The water is intensively used for electricity production as well as for drinking water supply for the communities of Liechtenstein. The Samina possesses A to B grade quality and sportsmen value the river for rafting.

=== Liechtenstein ===
In general the Saminatal is not very populated or exploited, therefore its wildlife is almost untouched. Many endangered animals and plants exist there.

There is one hydro-electric power station at Samina, which from 2011 to 2015 was transformed into a pumped-storage power station. The pump-storage reservoir has to always leave some water to the river, the amounts fixed by the Liechtenstein law for protection of water. There are measures taken to ensure the ecological conditions of the river. Nonetheless there is critique from ecologists, that these amounts are by far not enough to protect the wildlife in the river.

=== Austria ===
At the lower course the E-Werke Frastanz run three power plants.

The Austrian part of Samina is a popular destination for rafting.

In the middle part of the valley, around the border of Liechtenstein and Austria, there is the European Union nature protection area Spirkenwälder Saminatal.
