= Adolf Real =

Mayor of Vaduz (1897–1900; 1903–1909; 1912–1916)

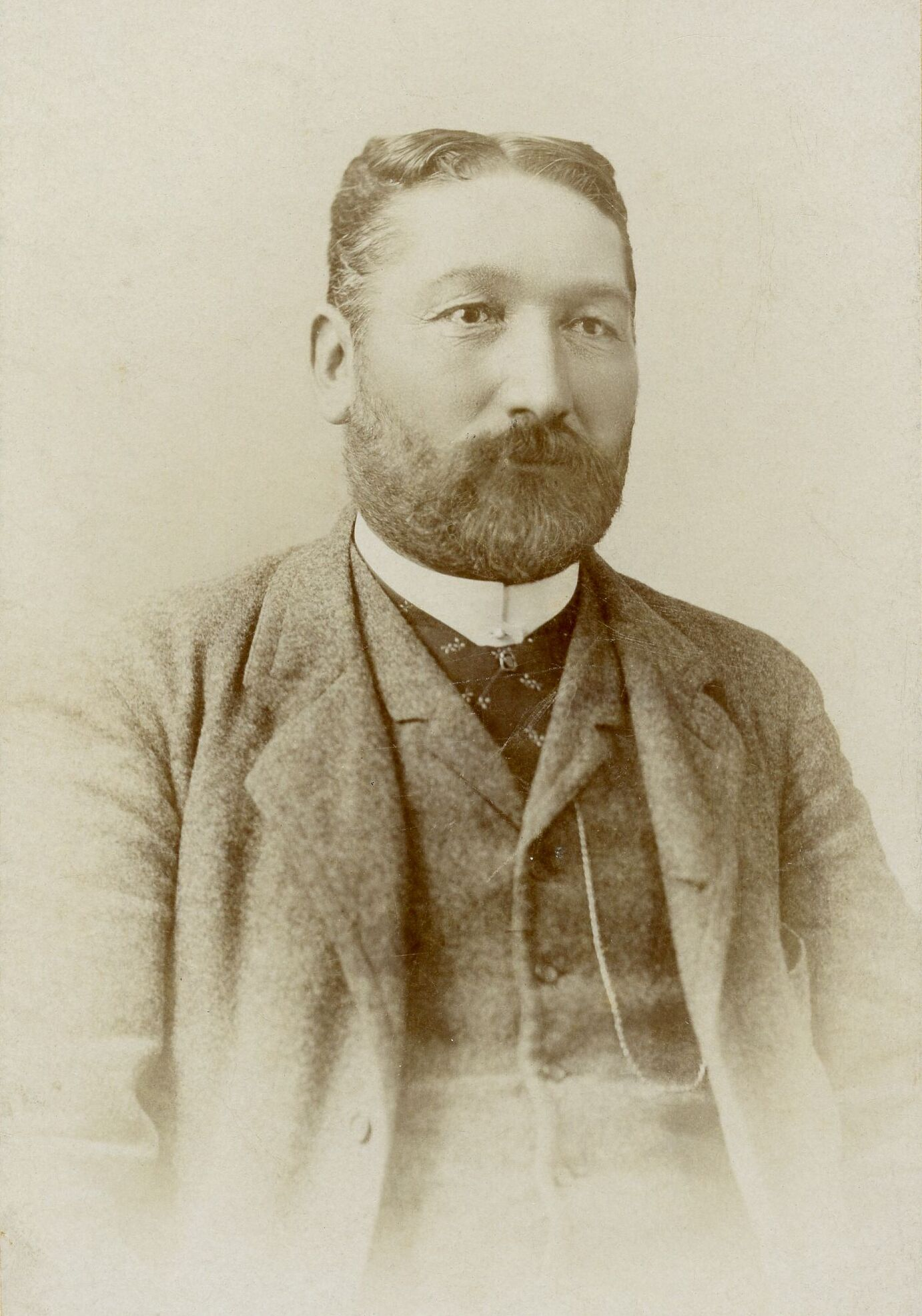

Mayor of Vaduz
- In office 1912 – 12 June 1916
- Preceded by: Franz Wachter
- Succeeded by: Gustav Ospelt
- In office 1903–1909
- Deputy: Franz Wachter
- Preceded by: Alois Seeger
- Succeeded by: Franz Wachter
- In office 1897–1900
- Preceded by: Reinold Amann
- Succeeded by: Alois Seeger

Personal details
- Born: 8 January 1858 Vaduz, Liechtenstein
- Died: 12 June 1916 (aged 58) Vaduz, Liechtenstein
- Spouse: Amalia Marxer (m. 1887)
- Relations: Johann Georg Marxer (father-in-law); Alois Seeger (brother-in-law); Gustav Schädler (son-in-law)
- Children: 6
- Parent: Felix Real (father)

Adolf Real (8 January 1858 – 12 June 1916) was a farmer and politician from Liechtenstein who served as the mayor of Vaduz on three occasions; from 1897 to 1900, 1903 to 1909, and 1912 until his death in 1916.

== Life ==
Real was born on 8 January 1858 in Vaduz as the son of future mayor Felix Real and Maria Anna (née Rheinberger) as one of seven children. He attended school in the municipality before working as a farmer and running a general store.

He was a member of the Vaduz municipal council from 1885 to 1888, treasurer of the municipality from 1888 to 1891, and then deputy mayor from 1891 to 1894. Real served as the mayor of Vaduz on three occasions; from 1897 to 1900, 1903 to 1909, and finally from 1912 to 1916. During this time, he was involved in the preparatory work for construction of Liechtenstein's first public power, which was constructed in 1901; he was also responsible for the establishment of Liechtenstein's first public water supply in 1910. Real was re-elected as mayor in 1900, but refused to take the office.

He was a judge from 1912 to 1916. Real was close to the opposition group formed around Wilhelm Beck. He was a co-founder of the Vaduz winegrowers' cooperative and an honorary member of the Vaduz fire department from 1906. Real was elected as a deputy member of the Landtag of Liechtenstein in the 1914 elections, but declined his election.

Real married Amalia Marxer (11 May 1862 – 26 September 1937), the daughter of Johann Georg Marxer, on 2 May 1887 and they had six children together. He was the brother-in-law of Alois Seeger, who also served as mayor of Vaduz. He died of a stroke on 12 June 1916, aged 58.

== Bibliography ==
- Vogt, Paul (1987). 125 Jahre Landtag (in German). Vaduz: Landtag of the Principality of Liechtenstein.
