= Erwin Hinderer =

German–Liechtensteiner architect (1901–1944)

- Born: 1901; Winterbach, Germany
- Disappeared: 1944; Soviet Union
- Occupation: Architect

Erwin Hinderer (1901 – MIA 1944) was a German-Liechtensteiner architect.

== Life ==
Hinderer was born in Winterbach studied architecture in Stuttgart. In 1930, he moved to Schaan and opened an architectural office. During this time, alongside Ernst Sommerlad, he designed the villa districts in Schaan. He also designed the English Building (now the Postal Museum) and the first factory used by Ramco (now Ivoclar).

He was the president of the Schaan tourist association and published the Official Travel Guide to the Principality of Liechtenstein in 1935.

Hinderer moved to Stuttgart in 1936 and worked as an architect. He served on the Eastern Front in World War II, where he was reported as missing in action in 1944.
