= Karl Schädler (politician, born 1850) =

Liechtensteiner engineer and politician (1850–1907)

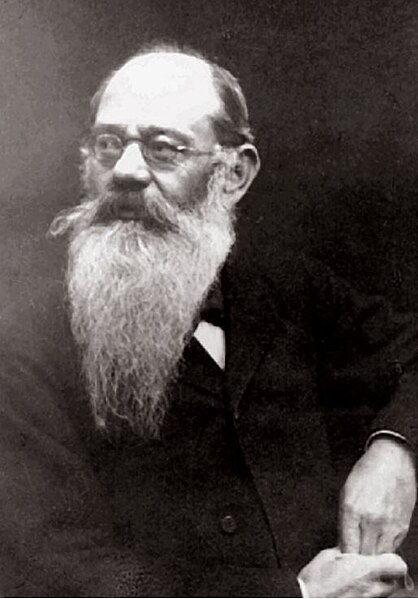

Member of the Landtag of Liechtenstein for Oberland
- In office 17 May 1894 – 21 December 1907
- Succeeded by: Jacob Wanger

Personal details
- Born: 26 January 1850 Vaduz, Liechtenstein
- Died: 21 December 1907 (aged 57) Vaduz, Liechtenstein
- Relations: Albert Schädler (brother)
- Parent(s): Karl Schädler; Katharina Walser

Karl Schädler (/ˈʃɛdlər/ SHED-lər, German: [kaʁl ˈʃɛːdlɐ]; 26 January 1850 – 21 December 1907) was an engineer and political figure from Liechtenstein who served in the Landtag of Liechtenstein from 1894 until his death in 1907.

== Early life and career ==
Schädler was born on 26 January 1850 in Vaduz as the son of his father by the same name, Karl Schädler, and his mother Katharina Walser as one of nine children, including his brothers Albert Schädler and Rudolf Schädler. He lived in the city throughout his childhood before attending secondary school in Freiburg im Breisgau and Schwyz. He studied civil engineering at the University of Zurich and the University of Stuttgart respectively.

From 1872 to 1881, he worked at a railway construction company in Württemberg, and then from 1882 to 1890, he operated an independent building contractor in both the German Empire and Austria-Hungary. From 1890 to 1893, Schädler oversaw the construction of a railway line in Venezuela and also various tunnels and bridges. He returned to Liechtenstein in 1893, and due to his ventures in engineering, he had amassed a considerable fortune.

== Political career and patronage ==
Upon his return to Liechtenstein in 1893, Schädler, similarly to his brothers before him, became active in politics. In 1894, he was elected into the Landtag of Liechtenstein, where he served until his death in 1907. In 1907 he, along with fellow Landtag members Jakob Kaiser and Fritz Walser pressed to create a new press law, but this was turned down by Governor of Liechtenstein, Carl von In der Maur. Throughout his time in the Landtag, Schädler advocated for the expansion of civil rights in Liechtenstein. The Christian-Social People's Party, formed in 1918, considered some of his ideas as the founding principles of the party.

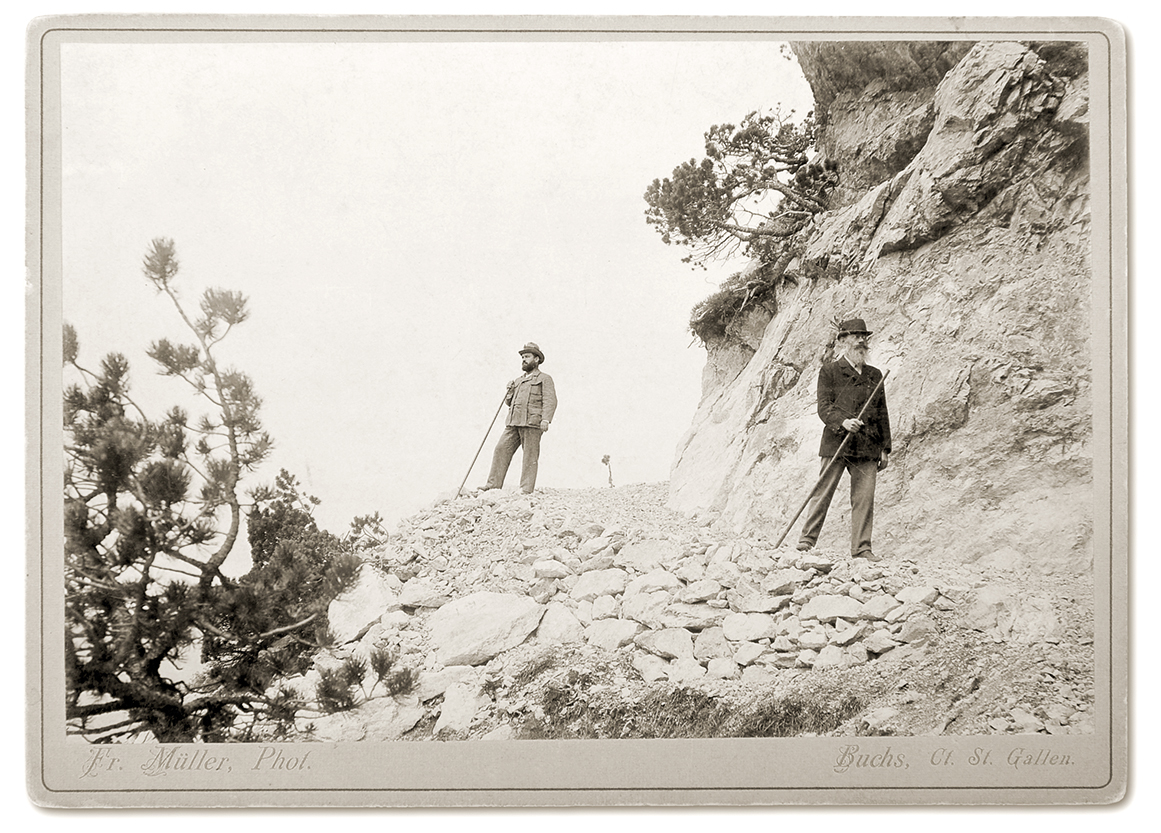
Schädler (right) on the Fürstensteig hiking route in 1898.

In 1898, he was a founder of the Vaduz rifle club and its first president from 1898 to 1907. In 1894, he bought the spa and health resort in Gaflei, which he ran alongside his brother Rudolf until 1907. During this time, he expanded the business to include 100 beds and built a new building. It also included the building of a new road from Gaflei to the resort, which allowed it to become one of the most occupied tourist destinations in Liechtenstein during and in the years after Schädler's lifetime. From 1906, he was an honorary member of the Vaduz fire brigade.

Schädler died on 21 December 1907, aged 56 years old. In his will, he bequeathed a large portion of his wealth into educational and poor aid developments in Liechtenstein, including, but not limited to the expansion of the Vaduz state school, a church in Balzers, funding for the poor houses in Triesen, Eschen, and Vaduz and the formation of a foundation to support the education of people in his family. In 1908, a monument was set up in Gaflei in his honour.

== Honours ==
- Venezuela: Order of the Liberator (1894)
