= Franz Josef Hoop (politician, born 1861) =

Liechtenstein politician (1861–1925)

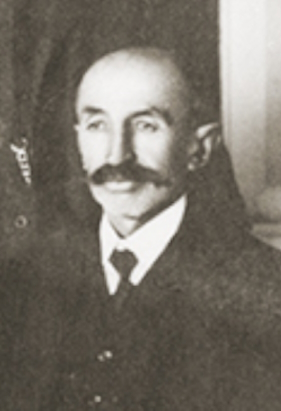
- Hoop in 1921

Member of the Landtag of Liechtenstein for Unterland
- In office 4 September 1902 – 5 February 1922

Mayor of Ruggell
- In office 1900–1912
- Preceded by: Chrysostomus Büchel
- Succeeded by: August Büchel
- In office 1891–1894
- Preceded by: Chrysostomus Büchel
- Succeeded by: Chrysostomus Büchel

Personal details
- Born: 7 March 1861 Ruggell, Liechtenstein
- Died: 15 January 1925 (aged 63) Ruggell, Liechtenstein
- Party: Progressive Citizens' Party (from 1918)
- Spouse: Maria Öhri (m. 1883)
- Children: 5, including Franz Xaver

Franz Josef Hoop (7 March 1861 – 15 January 1925) was a politician from Liechtenstein who served in the Landtag of Liechtenstein from 1902 to 1922. He previously served as mayor of Ruggell from 1897 to 1900 and again from 1900 to 1912.

He worked as a farmer. He was a member of the Ruggell municipal council from 1885 to 1888, municipal treasurer from 1888 to 1891 and deputy mayor twice; from 1897 to 1900 and again from 1918 to 1921. He was a judge from 1903 to 1919 and a founding member of the Progressive Citizens' Party in 1918.

Hoop married Maria Öhri (17 December 1861 – 6 June 1939) on 21 May 1883 and they had five children together. His son Franz Xaver Hoop also served as mayor of Ruggell and in the Landtag. Hoop died of pneumonia on 15 January 1925, aged 63.
