= Ferdinand Walser (politician, born 1848) =

Liechtenstein politician (1848–1934)

Member of the Landtag of Liechtenstein for Oberland
- In office 17 May 1894 – 4 September 1902
- In office 3 May 1882 – 20 April 1886

Mayor of Schaan
- In office 1903–1909
- Preceded by: Jakob Falk
- Succeeded by: Fritz Walser
- In office 1894–1900
- Preceded by: Josef Beck
- Succeeded by: Jakob Falk

Personal details
- Born: 24 May 1848 Schaan, Liechtenstein
- Died: 8 December 1934 (aged 86) St. Gallen, Switzerland
- Spouse(s): Maria Aloisia Schädler (m. 1881, died) Hildegard Schädler (m. 1883; died 1923)
- Children: 8

Ferdinand Walser (24 May 1848 – 8 December 1934) was a politician from Liechtenstein who served in the Landtag of Liechtenstein from 1882 to 1886 and again from 1894 to 1902. He also served as the mayor of Schaan from 1894 to 1900 and again from 1903 to 1909.

He was an innkeeper in Vaduz from 1875 to 1889. In 1891, he built and opened a restaurant in Schaan.

== Bibliography ==
- Vogt, Paul (1987). 125 Jahre Landtag (in German). Vaduz: Landtag of the Principality of Liechtenstein.
