= Albert Schädler =

President of the Landtag of Liechtenstein (1882–1886, 1890–1919)

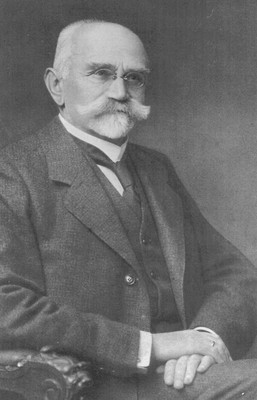

President of the Landtag of Liechtenstein
- In office January 1890 – December 1919
- Monarch: Johann II
- Vice President: Wilhelm Schlegel; Christoph Wanger; Karl Schädler; Fritz Walser; Lorenz Kind; Meinrad Ospelt
- Preceded by: Wilhelm Schlegel
- Succeeded by: Fritz Walser
- In office January 1882 – December 1886
- Monarch: Johann II
- Vice President: Peter Marxer
- Preceded by: Wilhelm Schlegel
- Succeeded by: Wilhelm Schlegel

Member of the Landtag of Liechtenstein for Oberland
- In office January 1890 – 30 March 1919
- In office January 1882 – December 1886

Personal details
- Born: 24 December 1848 Vaduz, Liechtenstein
- Died: 17 June 1922 (aged 73) Munich, Germany
- Spouse: Albertine Berl (m. 1872; died 1899)
- Relations: Karl Schädler (brother)
- Children: 2
- Parent(s): Karl Schädler; Katharina Walser

Albert Schädler (/ˈʃɛdlər/ SHED-lər, German: [ˈalbɛʁt ˈʃɛːdlɐ]; 24 December 1848 – 17 June 1922) was a Liechtenstein politician, physician, and historian. He served as the President of the Landtag of Liechtenstein from 1882 to 1886, and again from 1890 to 1919. A member of the prominent 19th-century Schädler family, he was well regarded as a physician and politician, and influenced the country's politics for decades.

== Early life ==
Schädler was born on 24 December 1848 in Vaduz to politician and later President of the Landtag of Liechtenstein Karl Schädler and Katharina Walser. He was one of nine children; his brothers included Karl Schädler and Rudolf Schädler.

From 1859 to 1867 he attended secondary school in Feldkirch, Mehrerau and Schwyz. From 1868 to 1871 he studied medicine in the University of Vienna, Zürich and Giessen, where he received a doctorate in medicine. In addition, he studied language in Paris and Lyon in 1879, and in London in 1887, learning to speak French and English.

== Medical career and patronage ==
From 1872 to 1910, Schädler and his brother Rudolf ran a medical practice in Vaduz that they took over from their father. In 1872, the two commissioned a new residential building in Vaduz with rooms for their practice by the Austrian architect Seraphin Pümpel. From 1873 to 1890 he worked as a spa doctor in Bad Ragaz and Pfäfers. For this purpose, he obtained the Federal Concordat Diploma in 1877 and wrote a book focused on the field in 1886.

From 1900 to 1910 the Liechtenstein government called on Schädler as a medical expert, consulting him about improving water supplies in the country; he also held continuing education courses for midwives. In 1914, he temporarily replaced Felix Batliner as deputy state physician while Batliner was doing voluntary work in an Austrian hospital.

Schädler frequently promoted and engaged in social life and culture in Liechtenstein. In 1879, together with his brother Rudolf, he organized Liechtenstein's first music festival, wrote poems and appeared as a public speaker at many public events within the country. In addition, from 1873 to 1878 he wrote articles for the Liechtensteinischen Wochenzeitung, which was owned by his brother Rudolf. He was a co-founder of the Historical Association for the Principality of Liechtenstein, and was its first president from 1901 to 1922. He published several works regarding the history of the country and in his will he left his collection of historical files and documents to the country, ensuring their preservation.

Upon his brother Karl's death in 1907, Schädler and Rudolf inherited the Kurhaus Gaflei, a foundation to establish a school for housekeeping. However, it did not come to fruition due to hyperinflation caused by economic devastation brought to the country during World War I.

== Political career ==
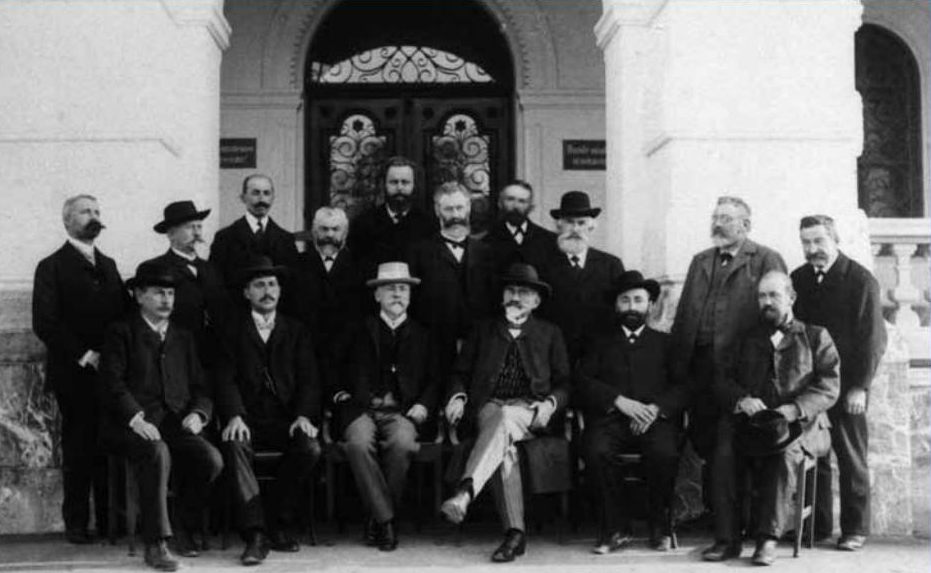
Schädler (front row, third from right) with members of the Landtag in 1908

From January 1882 to December 1886 and again from January 1890 to December 1919 Schädler was the President of the Landtag of Liechtenstein. He refused to accept his nomination to the 1886 Liechtenstein general election due to work in Bad Ragaz, instead becoming a substitute, and the position was held by Wilhelm Schlegel until he returned in 1890. He held considerable influence within the Landtag, he chaired the majority of the commissions conducted and held a close relationship with the consecutive Governors of Liechtenstein during his time there. Most notably, Schädler defended the freedoms granted by the 1862 Constitution of Liechtenstein, and when Governor Friedrich Stellwag von Carion attempted to decrease the power of the Landtag and imposed a temporary censorship on the Liechtensteiner Volksblatt in 1894, he opposed the actions and pushed for improvements in social legislation. In 1909 he suggested the introduction of old-age pensions and disability insurance, though he was unsuccessful.

In 1914, politician Wilhelm Beck formed an opposition group against Governor Leopold Freiherr von Imhof, which Schädler too became a target of due to his closeness with Imhof. Schädler's ideas became the founding ideas of the Progressive Citizens' Party in 1918, though he himself opposed the formation of parties in the Landtag and remained an independent. In the 1918 Liechtenstein general election, he failed to reach the number of votes to be elected but was then appointed by Johann II instead.

In the November 1918 Liechtenstein putsch, Wilhelm Beck, Martin Ritter and Fritz Walser proposed a motion of no confidence against Leopold Freiherr von Imhof. While the Landtag unanimously expressed its confidence in him it was decided, against the constitution and the princely deputies appointed Landtag members, to transfer the power of governor to a Provisional Executive Committee led by Martin Ritter. Schädler, along with the two other Landtag members appointed by Johann II, resigned in protest of the coup. He was succeeded by Fritz Walser.

On 30 March 1919, he formally left the Landtag as he did not approve of the political developments within Liechtenstein, particularly of the country's constitutional revision.

== Personal life and family ==
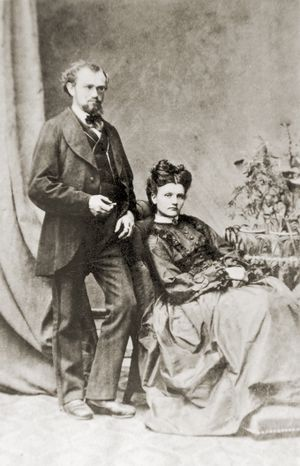
Schädler with his wife Albertine Berl in 1875

Schädler married Albertine Berl (6 October 1847 – 2 March 1899), the daughter of Feldkirch postmaster Theodor Berl, on 16 April 1872 and they had two children together. His nephew Rudolf Schädler was a leading Nazi in Liechtenstein and was involved in the Rotter kidnapping in 1933. He later became a founder and leader of the German National Movement in Liechtenstein in 1938.

After leaving the Landtag in March 1919, Schädler moved to Munich to live with his daughter, where he died on 17 June 1922. A street in Eschen is named after him.

== See also ==
- Politics of Liechtenstein
