= Ludwig Marxer (veterinarian) =

Liechtensteiner veterinarian and politician (1855-1946)

Member of the Landtag of Liechtenstein for Unterland
- In office 1886–1902

Mayor of Eschen
- In office 1888–1898
- Preceded by: Martin Öhri
- Succeeded by: Rochus Schafhauser

Personal details
- Born: 19 January 1855 Eschen, Liechtenstein
- Died: 26 October 1946 (aged 91) Vaduz, Liechtenstein
- Spouse: Maria Anna Öhri (m. 1884)
- Children: 8, including Ludwig Marxer
- Occupation: Veterinarian

Ludwig Marxer (19 January 1855 – 26 October 1946) was a veterinarian who served in the Landtag of Liechtenstein from 1886 to 1902. He also served as the mayor of Eschen from 1888 to 1898.

== Life ==
Marxer was born on 19 January 1855 in Eschen to one of ten children. His parents were trained veterinarians and he studied the field in Munich from 1870 to 1873.

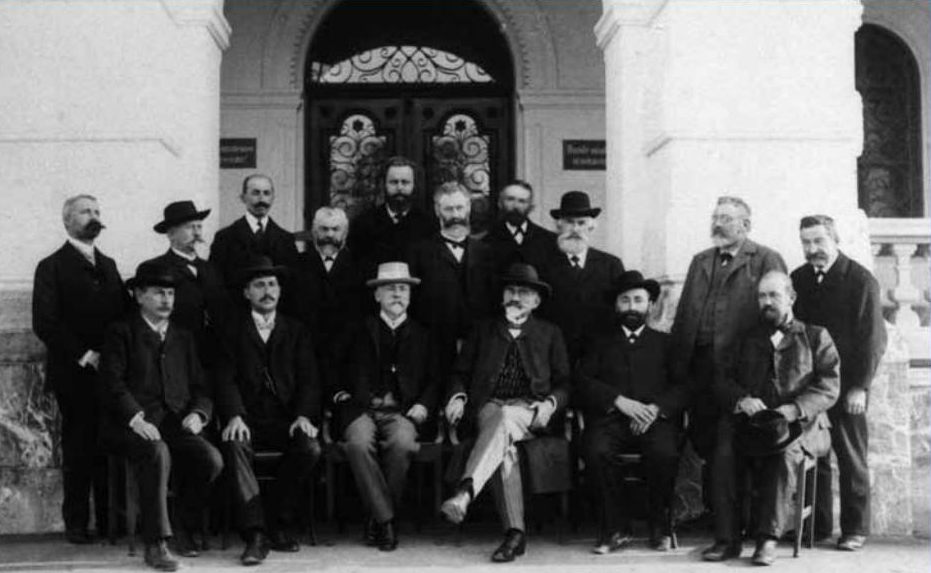
Marxer (back second from left) in front of the Vaduz government building, 1908.

He worked as a veterinarian in his home town of Eschen from 1877. He was appointed to serve in the Landtag of Liechtenstein by Johann II in 1886, a position in which he held until 1902. In 1888 he was elected as mayor of Eschen until he resigned the position in 1898 due to being appointed provisional state veterinarian and moving to Vaduz. He then served as the provisional state veterinarian until his retirement in 1936.

== Family ==
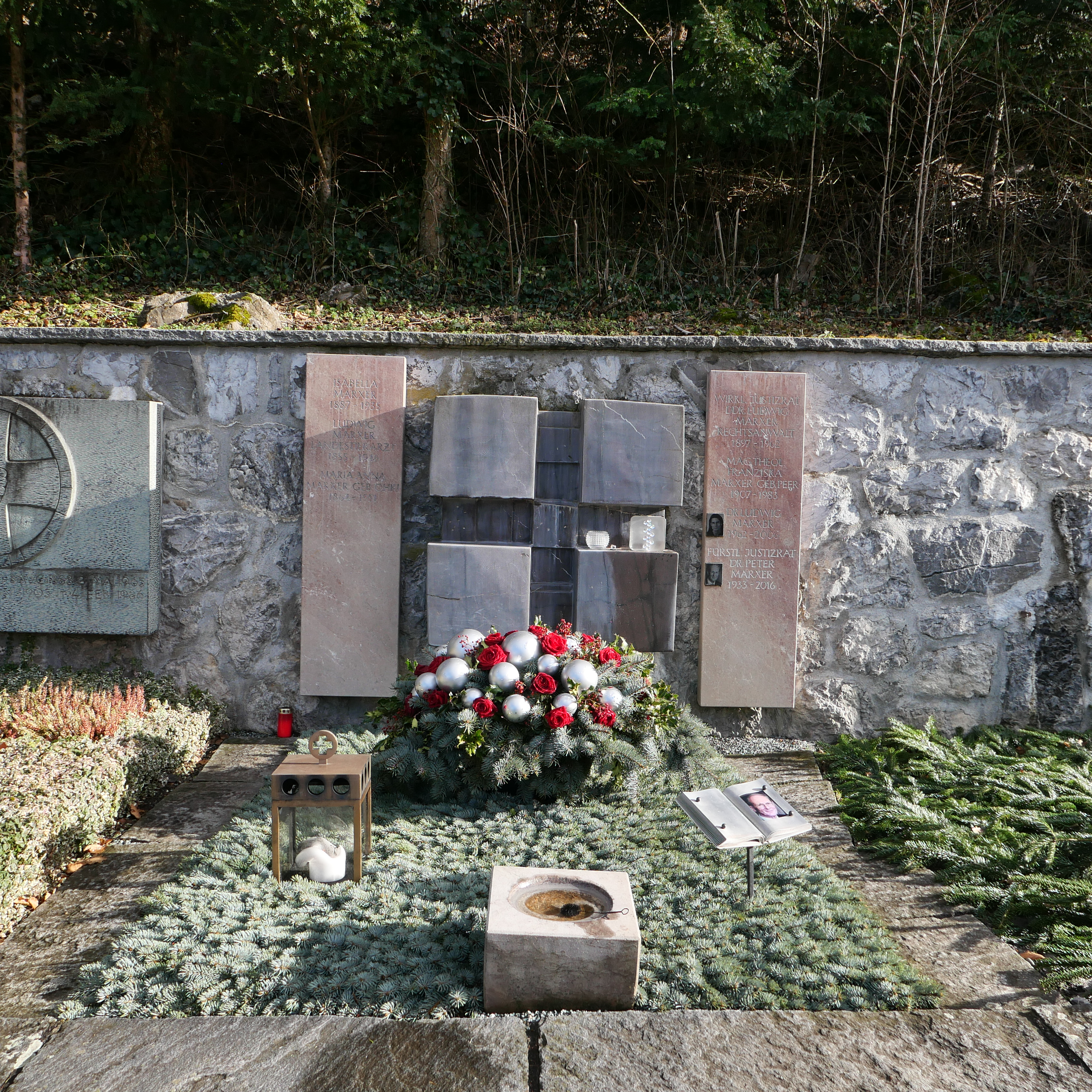
The family grave in 2024.

Marxer married Maria Anna Öhri (16 June 1864 – 9 May 1951) on 26 May 1884 and they had eight children. His son Ludwig Marxer was a lawyer and served as the Deputy Prime Minister of Liechtenstein from 1928 to 1933. Marxer died on 26 October 1946 in Vaduz, aged 91 years old.

Marxer was buried at the Vaduz cemetery. His wife, their daughter Isabelle (1887-1935), their son Ludwig, his wife Franziska, née Peer (1907-1983), as well as their son Peter (1933-2016), who also became a lawyer and politician, and his son Ludwig (1962-2006), who became a lawyer and crime writer, were buried in the same grave.
