= Planken =

Municipality in Oberland, Liechtenstein

- Municipality
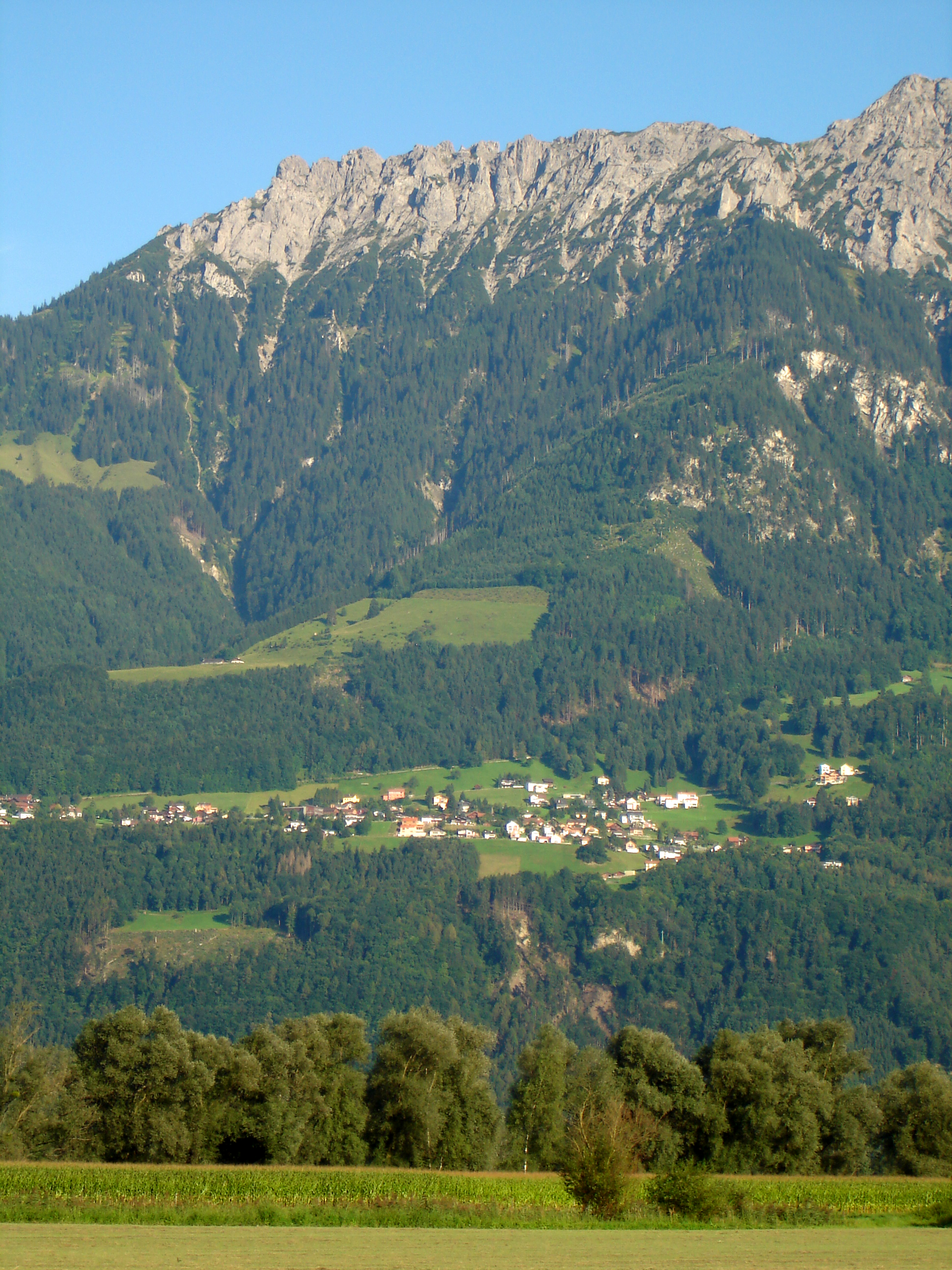
- Overlooking Planken

- Flag Coat of arms
- Interactive map of Planken
- Coordinates: 47°11′N 9°32′E
- Country: Liechtenstein
- Electoral district: Oberland
- Villages: none

Government
  - Mayor: Rainer Beck (VU)

Area
  - Total: 5.34 km^{2} (2.06 sq mi)
- Elevation: 786 m (2,579 ft)

Population (31-12-2019)
  - Total: 473
  - Density: 88.6/km^{2} (229/sq mi)
- Time zone: UTC+1 (CET)
  - Summer (DST): CEST
- Postal code: 9498
- Area code: 7006
- ISO 3166 code: LI-05
- Website: www.planken.li

Planken (German pronunciation: [ˈplaŋkn̩]; dialectal: Planka) is a municipality in Oberland, Liechtenstein. It has four exclaves, two enclaves and a population of 473. Thus it is the least populous municipality of Liechtenstein.

== History ==
The Romanic population from Schaan and Vaduz had already cleared the area of the village before the Walser migrated there in the 13th century and started clearing the upper parts of the municipality. The first documented naming was in the year 1361. The village was looted twice, first by the Swiss in 1499 when they campaigned against Frastanz (Battle of Frastanz) and in 1799 by the French when they ousted the Austrian forces during the Napoleonic Wars.

In 1868 the village was connected to the rest of Liechtenstein via road, making it reachable for bigger carriages. After a great conflagration in 1869 an exodus hit the village; in 1901 just 56 inhabitants remained. The situation improved due to a land reform from 1961 to 1981 and an enlargement of infrastructure.

== Politics ==
Planken is locally administered by the mayor and a 6-person municipal council, elected every four years since 1975. The incumbent mayor is Rainer Beck, since 2007.

=== List of mayors (1864–present) ===
List of mayors (1864–present)
| Name | Term | Party | Ref(s) |
|---|---|---|---|
| Ferdinand Negele | 1864–1867 | — | |
| Franz Josef Marxer | 1867–1870 | — | |
| Franz Martin Gantner | 1870–1873 | — | |
| Ferdinand Negele | 1873–1876 | — | |
| Gebhard Gantner | 1876–1882 | — | |
| Andreas Jehle | 1882–1885 | — | |
| Gebhard Gantner | 1885–1888 | — | |
| Peter Beck | 1888–1891 | — | |
| Gebhard Gantner | 1891–1894 | — | |
| Josef Negele | 1894–1897 | — | |
| Gebhard Gantner | 1897–1900 | — | |
| Josef Negele | 1900–1909 | — | |
| Lorenz Gantner | 1909–1912 | — | |
| Josef Negele | 1912–1915 | — | |
| Josef Negele | 1915–1921 | — | |
| Ferdinand Beck | 1921–1936 | FBP | |
| Gustav Jehle | 1936–1969 | FBP | |
| Anton Nägele | 1969–1983 | FBP | |
| Eugen Beck | 1983–1999 | FBP | |
| Gaston Jehle | 1999–2007 | FBP | |
| Rainer Beck | 2007– | VU | |

=== Last election ===
| Party | Votes | % | Seats | +/– |
|---|---|---|---|---|
| Progressive Citizens' Party | 745 | 56.70 | 4 | 0 |
| Patriotic Union | 569 | 43.30 | 2 | +1 |
| Free List | 0 | 0.00 | 0 | -1 |
| Total | 1,314 | 100.00 | 6 | 0 |
| Valid votes | 219 | 92.41 | | |
| Invalid votes | 11 | 4.64 | | |
| Blank votes | 7 | 2.95 | | |
| Total votes | 237 | 100.00 | | |
| Registered voters/turnout | 264 | 89.77 | | |
Source: Gemeindewahlen

== Geography ==
It is located on the western slope of Drei Schwestern. The center of the main village is on 786m a.s.l.. Additionally the plateau of Oberplanken belongs to the municipality. It borders on Gamprin's exclave Nendler Berg, the Vaduz' exclave Dachsegg and Eschen in the North, on the Austrian municipality of Frastanz in the East and on Schaan in the South and in the West.

The exclave Plankner Garselli is a former alp in the Samina valley. The Plankner Neugrütt is a cliffy forest north of the village, separated from it by a stripe of 20m of land and surrounded by an exclave of Schaan with the same name. The other two exclaves are in the Rhine Valley: Wes is a small meadow and Riet-Äscher is a marsh, both are surrounded by territory of Schaan.

Furthermore, there are two enclaves consisting of woods: Rüttistein, which belongs to Vaduz, and Schaan's Brunnenegg.

=== Alps ===
There are four alps in the municipality:

| Alp | Etymology | Owner | Total area | Pasture area | Source |
|---|---|---|---|---|---|
| Gafadura | Old Romansh: cavradüra (clearing) | Municipality of Planken | 90ha | 24ha | |
| Alpzinka | tapering part of the alp | Municipality of Planken | 90ha | 24ha | |
| Rütti | Mentioned 1607 as Reiti (clearing) | Municipality of Planken | 22ha | | |
| Plankner Garselli | Old Romansh: clusella (small gully)? | Municipality of Planken | 187ha | - | |

The alp Gafadura on the western slope of Drei Schwestern was settled by Walser, alike Saroja, from Triesenberg and inhabited until the 15th century. In 1579 the owners of Gafadura, Gaflonen (today: Alpzinka) and Garselli handed their former cooperative alps over to the municipality. It was first given to single farmers until 1875 when it became a communal farming project until 1960. Since then its use is limited to cattle farming and the forestry industry. The Gafadura chalet was built 1926 as a princely hunting lodge and taken over by the Liechtensteiner Alpenverein in 1968.

Alpzinka was first mentioned in 1428 and was probably settled until the mid-15th century. Since then this area belonging to Gafadura was used for agriculture.

Rütti, formerly also known as "Maiasäss" was used as a Maiensäss for Gafadura.

Plankner Garselli is located in the western Samina Valley. The use of this steep and dry alp was not intensive since the 19th century and was limited to cattle. The agricultural activity ceased between 1880 and 1890. Since 2000 it is part of the Natural Forest Reserve Garselli/Zigerberg.

== Sights ==
Its most notable structure is the eighteenth-century St. Josef Chapel, which belongs to the parish of Schaan. It is supposed to have been built in 1761 and in 1861 a tower was added that contains a bell from 1724. 1929 Prince Franz I founded the chapel's three baroque revival altars. It was then redesigned in 1955 under the supervision of architect Felix Schmid of Rapperswil.

== Notable people ==
- Hanni Wenzel (born 1956), alpine skier
- Andreas Wenzel (born 1958), alpine skier
- Petra Wenzel (born 1961), alpine skier
- Tina Weirather (born 1989), alpine skier
- Jessica Walter (born 1984), alpine skier

== Gallery ==
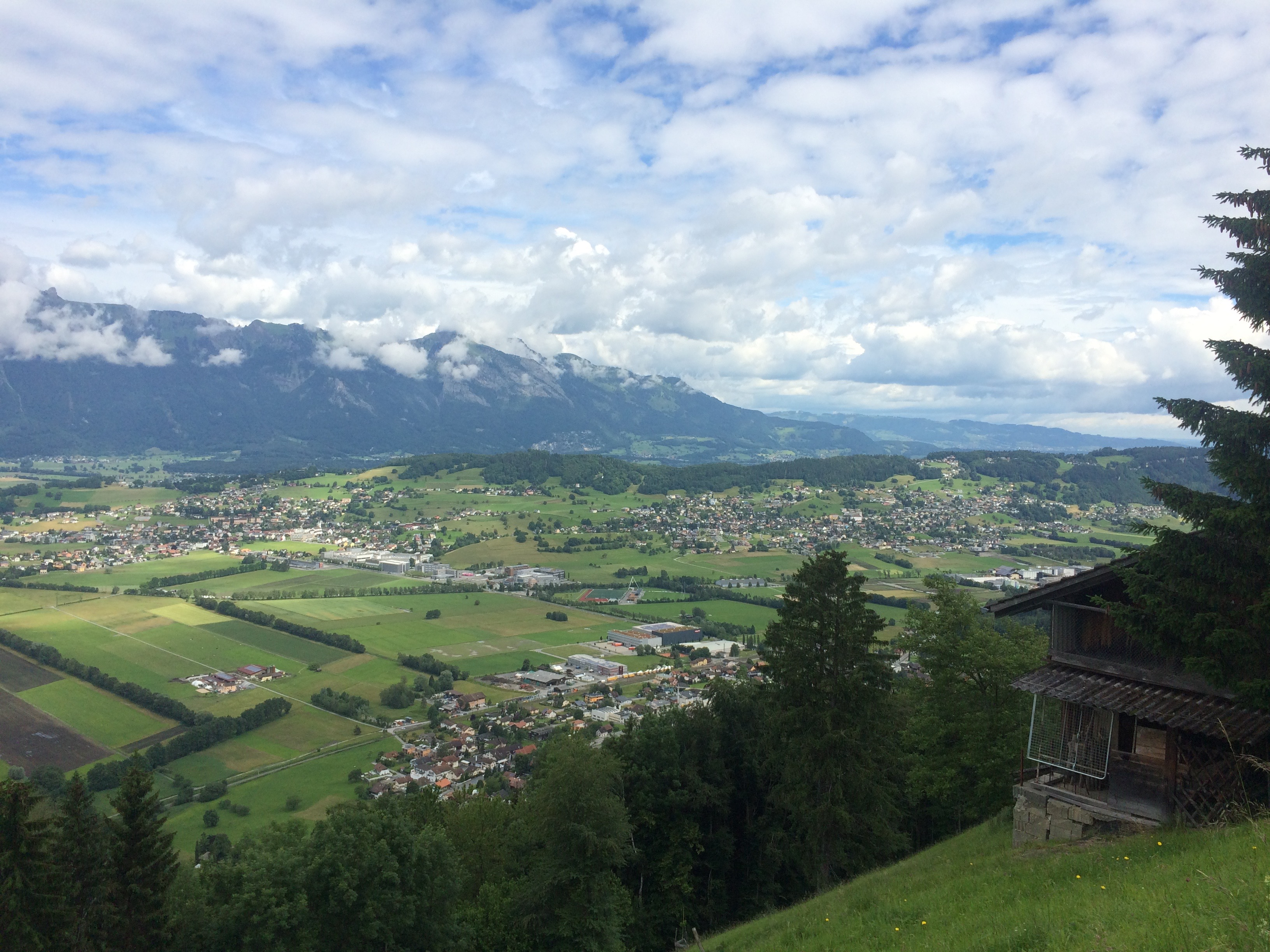
View of the valley from the Planken hillside

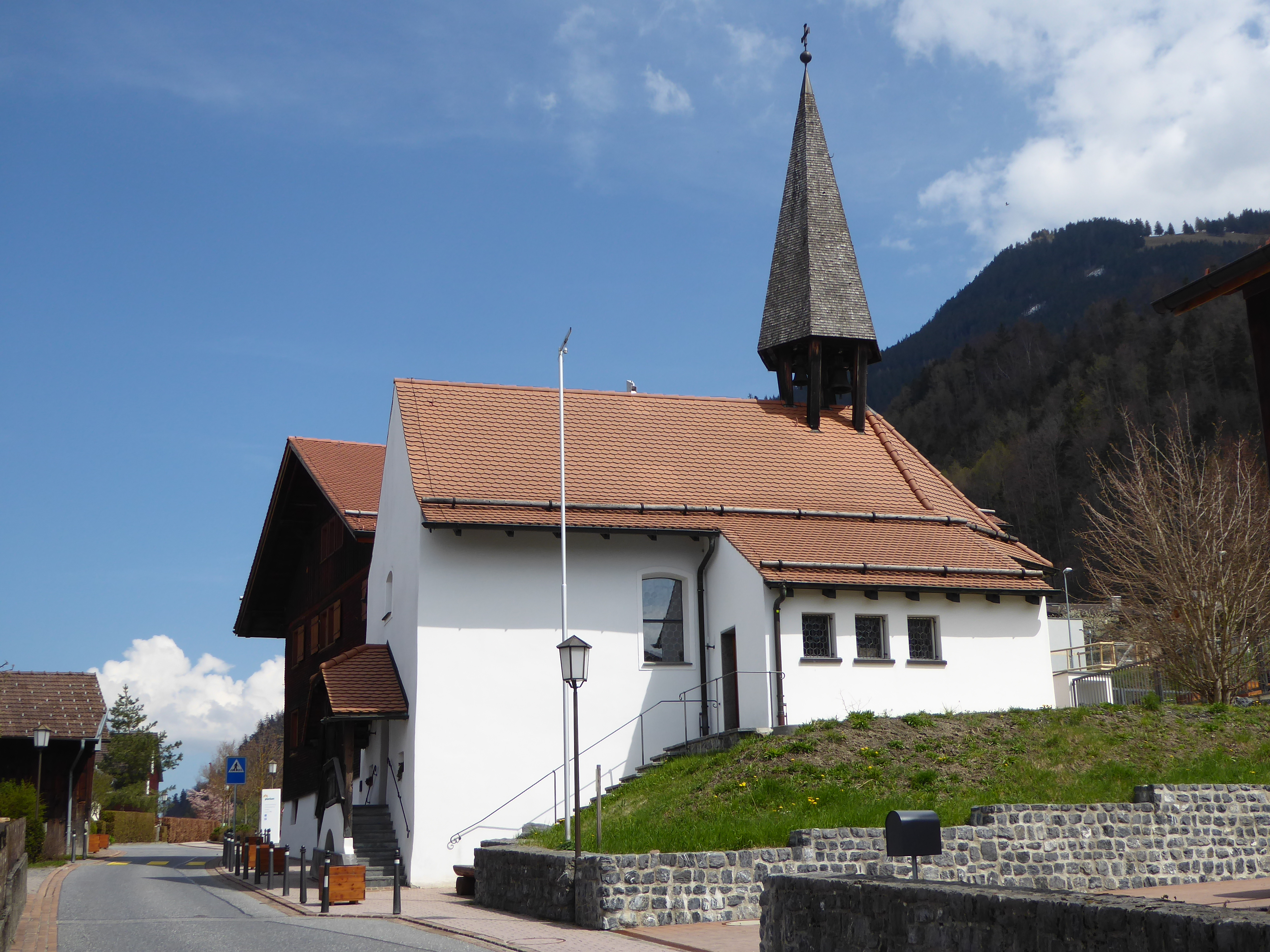
Village church

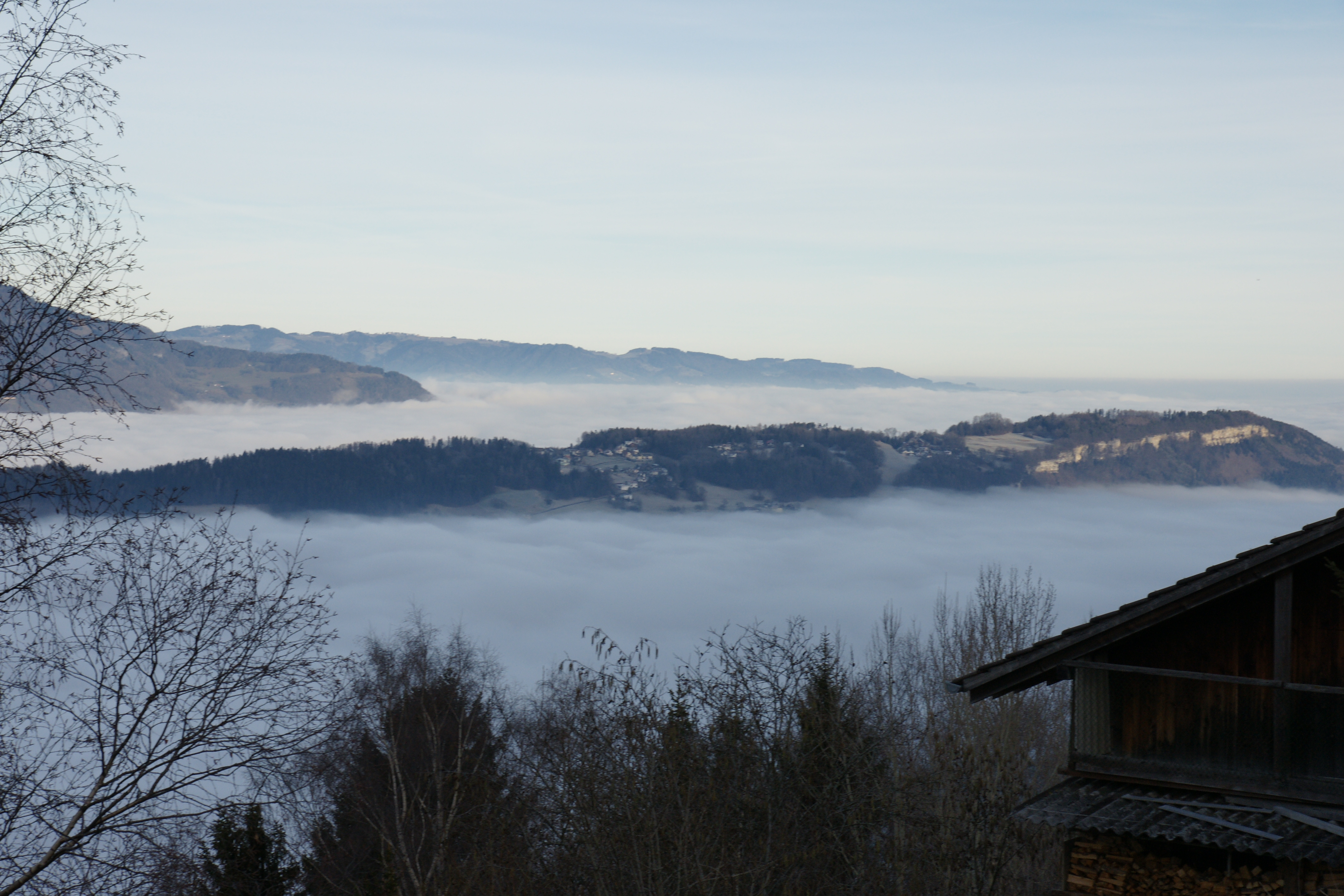
View with fog
