= Eschen =

Eschen Escha
- Municipality
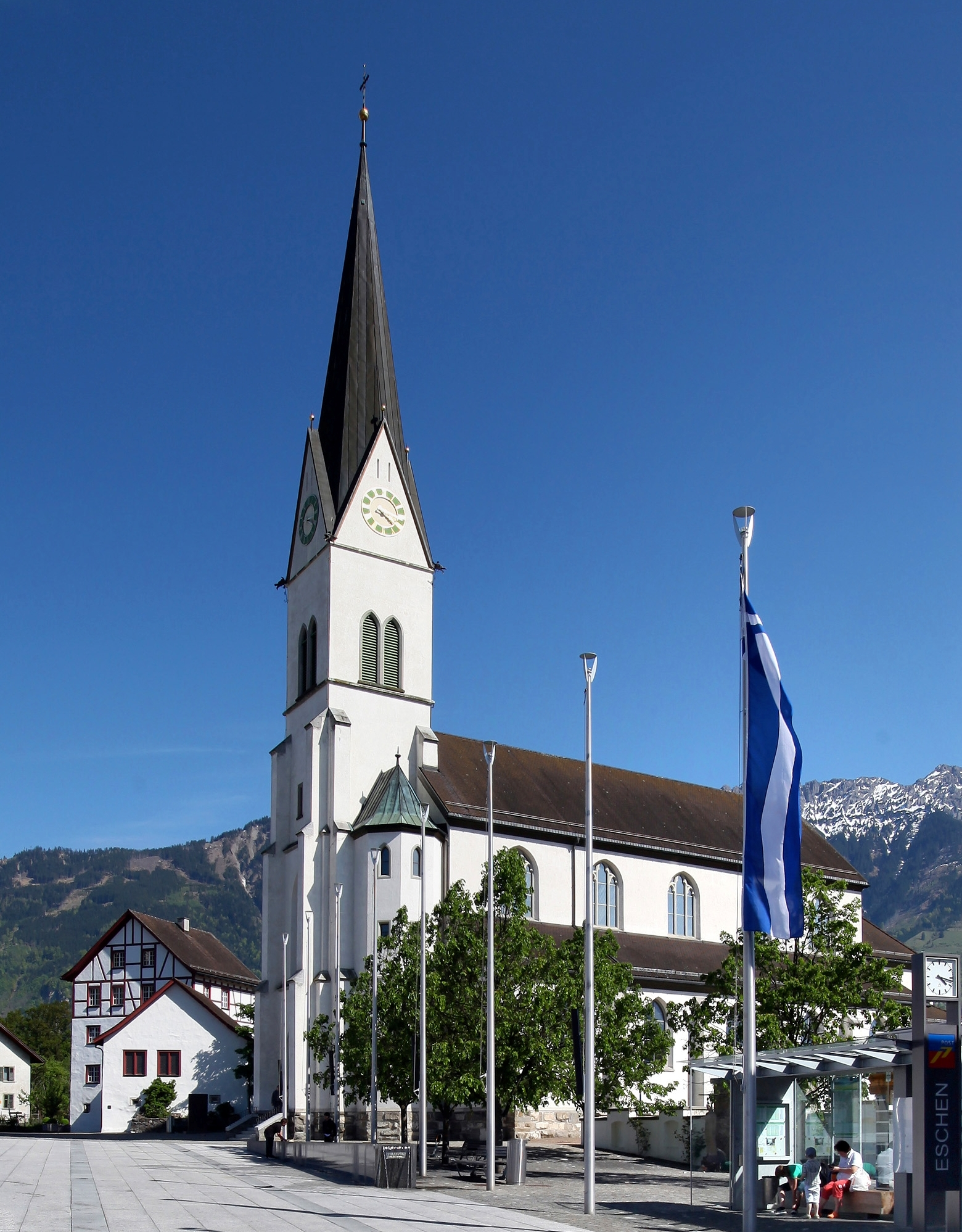
- Eschen Parish Church

- Flag Coat of arms
- Interactive map of Eschen
- Coordinates: 47°13′N 9°31′E
- Country: Liechtenstein
- Electoral district: Unterland

Government
  - Mayor: Tino Quaderer (FBP)

Area
  - Total: 10.3 km^{2} (4.0 sq mi)
- Elevation: 453 m (1,486 ft)

Population (2023)
  - Total: 4,629
  - Density: 449/km^{2} (1,160/sq mi)
- Time zone: UTC+1 (CET)
  - Summer (DST): CEST
- Postal code: 9492
- Area code: 7007
- ISO 3166 code: LI-02
- Website: www.eschen.li

Eschen (German pronunciation: [ˈɛʃn̩]; High Alemannic: Escha) is a municipality in the north of Liechtenstein. It covers an area of 10.3 km^{2} (4.0 sq mi), and is one of the five communes in the Unterland electoral district. As of 2024, it has a population of 4,629 inhabitants.

== Etymology ==
The name is considered to be of Celtic origin, derived from "esca" meaning "by the waterside".

== History ==
Archaeological evidence points to some pre-historic settlements in the region. Eschen was established as "Essane" during the Rätic reign in 842 CE. The name of the village Nendeln appears in written text from the 14th century CE. It is given by different names such as Nendla, Endlen, and Anndlen. The first lower secondary school was opened in Eschen in 1906.

== Geography ==
Eschen is a municipality in the north of Liechtenstein. It covers an area of 10.3 km^{2} (4.0 sq mi), and is one of the five communes in the Unterland electoral district. It shares international borders with Vorarlberg in Austria, and St. Gallen in Switzerland. Locally, it shares land borders with the capital of Vaduz, and other municipalities of Mauren, Schellenberg, Gamprin, Planken and Schaan.

As of 2024, it has a population of 4,629 inhabitants. The municipality includes the village of Nendeln, which has a train station on the Feldkirch-Buchs line.

== Politics ==
Eschen is locally administered by the mayor and a ten member municipal council, elected every four years. The incumbent mayor is Tino Quaderer, since 2019.

=== Last election ===
Party	Votes	%	Seats	+/–
Progressive Citizens' Party	6,502	42.72	4	0
Patriotic Union	5,896	38.74	4	–1
Democrats for Liechtenstein	2,822	18.54	2	+1
Total	15,220	100.00	10	0
Valid votes	1,522	95.18		
Invalid votes	46	2.88		
Blank votes	31	1.94		
Total votes	1,599	100.00		
Registered voters/turnout	2,342	68.27		
Source: Gemeindewahlen

== Economy ==
The headquarters of ThyssenKrupp Presta is located in Eschen. USV Eschen/Mauren is the municipality's local football club.

== Notable people ==
- Josef Hoop (1895 in Eschen – 1959 in Chur) an attorney-at-law and was Prime Minister of Liechtenstein from 1928 to 1945.
- Gerard Batliner (1928 in Eschen – 2008 in Eschen) an attorney-at-law and was Prime Minister of Liechtenstein from 1962 to 1970.
- John Latenser Sr. (1858–1936) Native of Nendeln. Architect involved in several large public projects in Omaha, Nebraska of the US.
