= Eschnerberg =

- Schellenberg
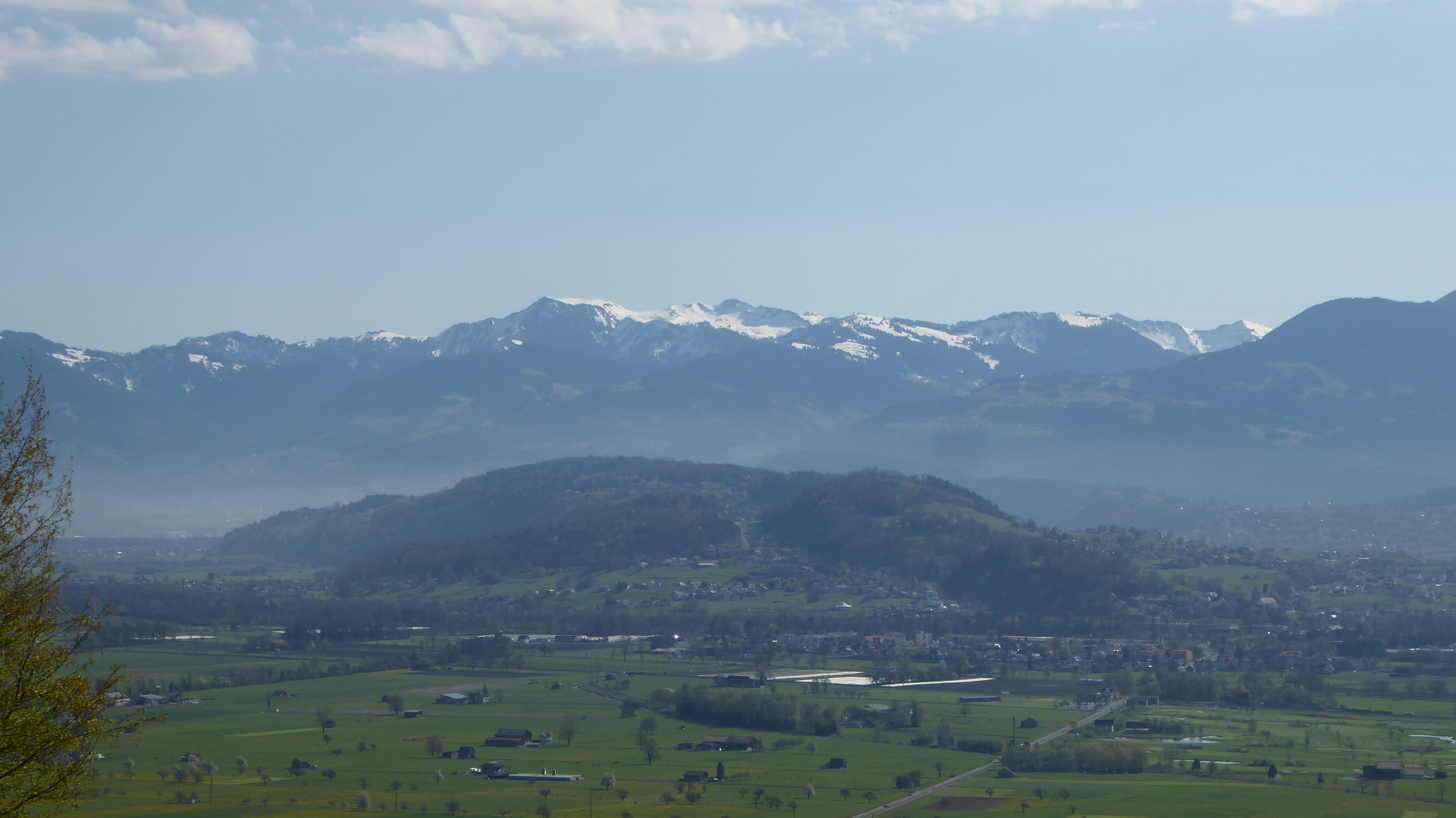
- View of Eschnerberg (centre) from the west-southwest, with part of Gamprin (lower) and Schellenberg ((upper) visible on its slopes; Hoher Freschen in the background

Highest point
- Coordinates: 47°14′25″N 9°33′56″E (761023 / 234333)

Geography
- Location: Rhine Valley, Border of Liechtenstein and Vorarlberg (Austria)

Eschnerberg, also Eschner Berg and Schellenberg (especially used in the Austrian town of Feldkirch), is a 698-metre (2,290 ft) high mountain of seven peaks in the Rhine Valley, on the border of Liechtenstein and the Austrian state of Vorarlberg. It is close to Eschen, Hinterschellenberg and Schellenberg – the latter two of which are on its slopes – in Liechtenstein, and Feldkirch in Austria.

== Geography ==
The more extensive southern part of the mountain is located in the Liechtensteiner district of Unterland, while the less extensive northern part is in the Austrian district of Feldkirch, within a region called Vorarlberger Oberland. The whole mountain itself is about 7 km long and 2 km broad. It overlooks the River Rhine to its west.

Settlements on the mountain include Eschen, Mauren, Gamprin, Ruggell and Schellenberg on the Liechtenstein side and the minor districts of the Feldkirch Ortsteil of Tosters and Fresch in Nofels on the Austrian side. The highest peak is located on the Liechtenstein side.

== Geology ==
Eschnerberg is an inselberg, formed by the former Rhine Glacier, being an extension of the Walserkamm. It is part of the Rhenodanubian Flysch Zone, called Vorarlberger Flysch, of which the neighboring Bregenz Forest Mountains are also a part. Though this classification is orographically and geographically correct, it is classified as part of the Rätikon by the Alpine Club classification of the Eastern Alps (1984), due to its location south of the River Ill.

== History ==
The mountain was one of the earliest settled places in the Rhine valley (Rössen culture, c. 4400 BCE [Neolithic]); artefacts were found in the archaeological site of Borscht, close to Schellenberg.

The name Schellenberg is due to the reign of the Schellenberger family, who established the Lordship of Schellenberg in the 10th century (nevertheless most Liechtensteiners use the historical term Eschnerberg). They named the village of Schellenberg and erected two castles on the mountain: Neu-Schellenberg [Obere Burg] (1200) and Alt-Schellenberg [Untere Burg] (1250). The names were bestowed during archaeological excavations in the 1960s, as the archaeologists were convinced that the upper site would be the younger one, thus naming it Neu-Schellenberg. The mistake was discovered by the archaeologist Jakob Bill in 1980, who found out that they were named the other way round on historical maps and chronicles, also stating that both castles were ruins. They were used as sources of construction stone during the 19th century. Nowadays they belong to the Principality's historical society.

== Hiking ==
There is a hiking path over the Eschnerberg, along which information boards are placed informing about the castles and the history of the region.
