= Upper Castle =

Upper Castle may refer to:

- Upper Castle (Vilnius), Lithuania
- Upper Castle, Zizers, Switzerland
- Upper Tüchersfeld Castle, Tüchersfeld, Germany
- Part of Ambras Castle, Insbruck, Austria
- Canajoharie, of one of two major towns of the Mohawk nation in 1738
- Grodno Upper Castle, Belarus
- Part of Kobryn castles, Belarus
- Lubart's Castle, Lutsk, Ukraine
- Obere Burg, Liechtenstein
- Part of Orava Castle, Slovakia
- Part of Pustý hrad, Zvolen, Slovakia
- Precursor of Rožmberk Castle, Czech Republic
- Part of Trzewlin Castle of Dunajec river castles, Poland

== See also ==
- Gornji Grad (disambiguation), literally "Upper Castle"
- Oberburg (disambiguation), literally "Upper Castle"
- Qaleh-ye Bala (disambiguation), literally "Upper Castle"
- Visegrad, literally "Upper Castle"
