= Boris Smyslovsky =

Russian military officer and Nazi collaborator

Boris Alekseyevich Smyslovsky
- Born: 3 December 1897; Terijoki (Vyborg Province), Grand Duchy of Finland, (Note: today Zelenogorsk, Saint Petersburg, Russia) Russian Empire
- Died: 5 September 1988 (aged 90); Vaduz, Liechtenstein
- Military career
- Allegiance: Russia; White movement; Germany
- Branch: Russian Imperial Army; German Army (Wehrmacht)
- Rank: Captain (Russian Imperial Army); Generalmajor (Wehrmacht)
- Commands: Sonderdivision R First Russian National Army
- Conflicts: World War I Russian Civil War; World War II
- Awards: Order of the German Eagle; Ostvolk Medal; Order of Saint Anna; Order of Saint Stanislaus (Imperial House of Romanov)

Boris Alexeyevich Smyslovsky (Note: also Smyslovsky-Holmston and Holmston-Smyslovsky) (Russian: Борис Алексеевич Смысловский; 3 December 1897 – 5 September 1988), also known under the pseudonyms Hauptmann von Regenau and (later) Arthur Holmston (Russian: Артур Хольмстон), was a Russian-Finnish general, émigré and anti-communist. He commanded the pro-Axis collaborationist First Russian National Army during World War II.

== World War I ==
He joined the Imperial Russian Army, where he advanced to the rank of captain in the Imperial Guards.

== Russian Civil War and the interwar period ==
During the Russian Civil War he fought against the Bolsheviks in the White Army and then moved to Poland and later to Germany. He attended the Prussian Military Academy. His view was that foreign intervention and help was needed to free Russia from Bolshevism.

== World War II ==
The White émigré and Russian nationalist Boris Smyslovsky, commanded the eastern battalion of the Russian All-Military Union based in Serbia, and in July 1941 formed an Abwehr Training Battalion (Lehrbattalion) for anti-partisan and warfare duties under Wehrmacht Army Group North. By December, he had recruited more than 10,000 Russians into 12 reconnaissance battalions, unified into Sonderdivision R. In March 1942, Smyslovsky formed the Sonderstab R counterintelligence agency in Warsaw, with Colonel Mikhail M. Shapovalov controlling 1,000 agents in detachment in Pskov.

He soon realized that Nazi ideology was at collision with his views of intelligent use of Russian anti-Bolshevik forces and established feelers to Switzerland in case he would need asylum at the war's end.

=== 1st Russian National Army ===
Towards the end of the war Germany upgraded its Russian volunteers in the war effort, and the army led by Smyslovsky was eventually elevated to the 1st Russian National Army, i.e. the status of an independent Axis army, on 10 March 1945. By April 1945, Smyslovsky had moved his fighters to Feldkirch where he met Grand Duke Vladimir Cyrillovich, the Romanov claimant to the Russian Imperial Crown. The whittled-down army of 462 men, 30 women, and 2 children then moved into neutral Liechtenstein on 2 May 1945, the Grand Duke, however, decided to stay in the US occupied zone in Austria because neither Liechtenstein nor Switzerland would issue him a visa. The Russians were cared for by the Liechtenstein Red Cross. On 16 August 1945, a Soviet delegation came to Liechtenstein in an attempt to repatriate the Russians. About 200 of the group agreed to return. The remainder stayed in Liechtenstein for another year, resisting with support of Liechtenstein further pressure by the Soviet government to participate in the repatriation program. Eventually the government of Argentina offered asylum, and about 100 people left. Smyslovsky later served as an advisor to Juan Perón.

According to Alexander Frick, Prime Minister of Liechtenstein, the Russians were at no point in danger of being extradited, and the local population fully supported the government in providing asylum to the Russians. The small population of the country (12,141 in 1945) supported the émigrés (4% of the population) at a rate of 30,000 Swiss francs per month for two years, and paid their costs to move to Argentina; they did not know that these costs were later to be reimbursed by Germany. Liechtenstein was the only country that routinely refused requests by Soviet authorities for the extradition of Soviet citizens suspected of treasonous activities and/or war crimes during World War II. The Liechtenstein government did not obstruct individuals who agreed voluntarily to return to the Soviet Union.

== Death ==
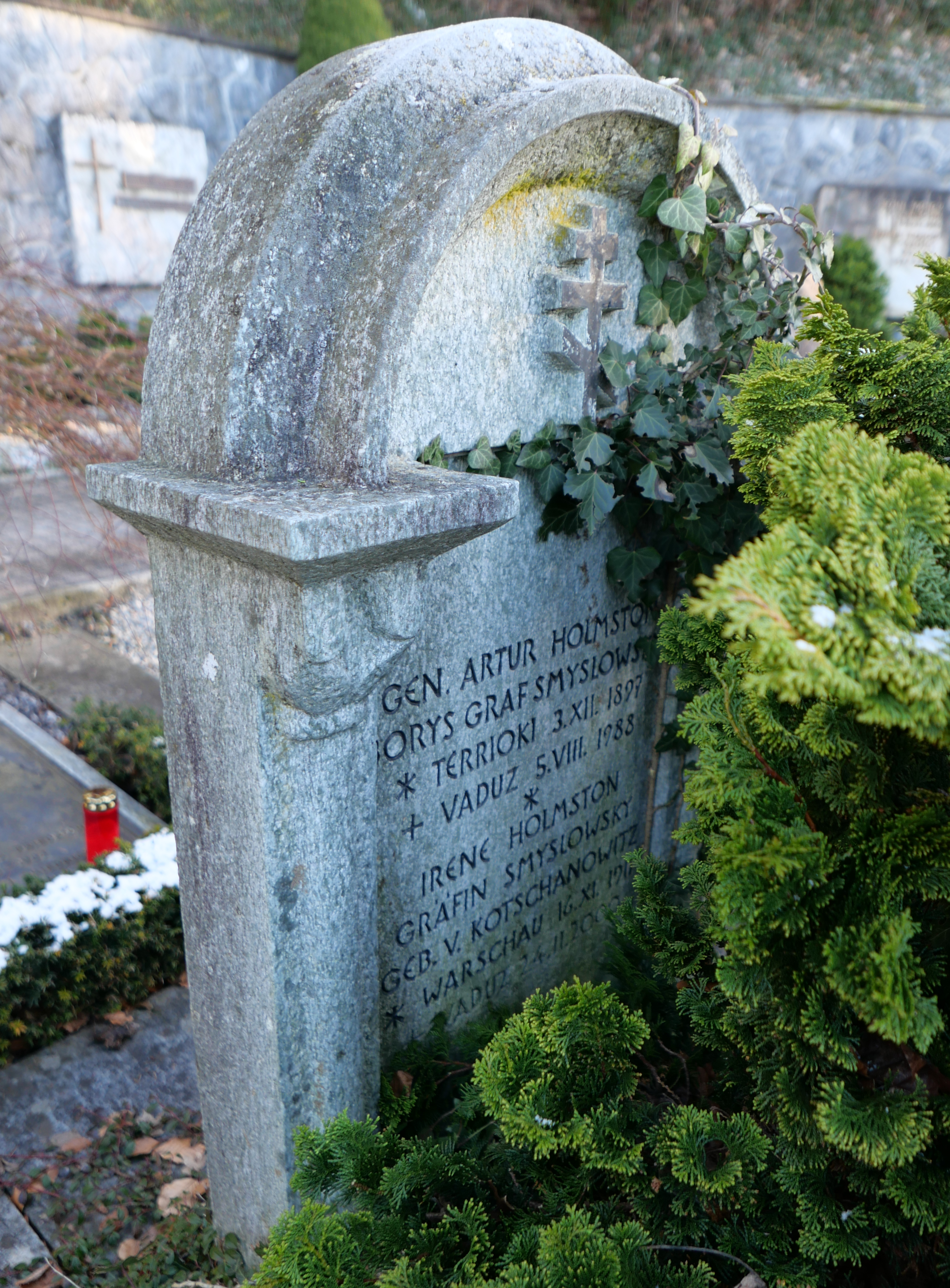
Smyslovsky's grave in 2024.

He went into exile in Argentina. In 1975 he returned to Liechtenstein with his wife Irene. He died in Vaduz on 5 September 1988 and was buried there. His third wife Irene, née Kochanovich (1911–2000), an artist from Poland, was later buried next to him in the same tomb.

== Awards and decorations ==
- Order of Saint Stanislaus (Imperial House of Romanov) 3rd and 4th class with swords and ribbon
- Order of Saint Anne 3rd class with swords and ribbon and 4th class for bravery
- Eastern Front Medal
- War Merit Cross 2nd class with swords
- Iron Cross 2nd class
- Ostvolk Medal 2nd class in gold and silver with swords
- Ostvolk Medal 1st class in gold and silver with swords
- Order of the German Eagle 2nd class with swords

== Movie ==
The 1993 French movie Vent d'est, directed by Robert Enrico, is based on the perambulation of Smyslovsky and his army. He is portrayed by Malcolm McDowell.

== See also ==
- Russian Monument
- Russian Liberation Movement
- Andrey Vlasov
- Bronislav Kaminski

== Bibliography ==
- Beyda O., ‘Les collaborationnistes russes et la principalité du Liechtenstein,’ Nasha Gazeta. Édition Russe-Français, no. 16 (2020): 44-60
- Geiger F., Schlapp M. Russen in Liechtenstein. Flucht und Internierung der Wehrmacht-Armee Holmston 1945–1948. Mit der Liste der Interniert und dem russischen Tagebuch des Georgij Simon. – Vaduz: Schalun Verlag; Zürich: Chronos Verlag, 1996. – S. 170-184.
- Geiger P., Schlapp M. Russen in Lichtenstein. Flucht und Internierung der Wehrmacht-Armee Holmstons 1945–1948. – Vaduz: Schalun Verlag / Zürich: Schalun Verlag / Chronos Verlag, 1996. – 370 S.
- Geiger Peter. Kriegszeit. Liechtenstein 1939 bis 1945. – 2 Bände, Chronos-Verlag, Zürich, 2010. – 1328 S.
- Grimm C. Internierte Russen in Liechtenstein / Jahrbuch des Historisches Vereins für das Fürstentum Liechtenstein. Vaduz, 1971.
- Jud Ursina. Liechtenstein und die Flüchtlinge zur Zeit des Nationalsozialismus (Studie 1). Veröffentlichungen der Unabhängigen Historikerkommission Liechtenstein Zweiter Weltkrieg. Verlag des Historischen Vereins für das Fürstentum Liechtenstein. – Vaduz, und
- Chronos Verlag, Zürich, 2005. – 310 S.
- Littlejohn D. Foreign Legions of the Third Reich. Vol. 4. San Jose: R. James Benoer Publishing, 1994. 382 p.; David Littlejohn. Patriotic Traitors: History of Collaboration in German Occupied Europe, 1940-45. – London: William Heinemann Ltd, 1972. – 391 p.
- Грибков, И. В. Особый штаб «Россия» / И.В. Грибков, Д.А. Жуков, И.И. Ковтун. – М.: Вече, 2011. – 464 с.
- Дробязко, С. И. Иностранные формирования Третьего рейха: Иностранцы на службе нацизма: история европейского коллаборационизма / С. И. Дробязко, О. В. Романько, К. К. Семенов. – 2-е издание, переработанное и дополненное. – Москва: АСТ; Астрель; Харвест, 2011. – 832 с.
- Дробязко, С. И. Эпопея генерала Смысловского // Материалы по истории Русского Освободительного движения: Сб. статей, документов и воспоминаний. Вып. 4. – М.: Архив РОА, 1999. – С. 116-143.
- Мартынов, А. В. К вопросу о моральном состоянии коллаборантов на примере 1-й Русской национальной армии // История. Научное обозрение OSTKRAFT. – 2020. – № 1(13). – С. 100-106.
- Мартынов, А. В. Лихтенштейн как проблема и проблема Лихтенштейна: судьба воинов 1-й русской национальной армии / А. В. Мартынов // Философические письма. Русско-европейский диалог. – 2022. – Т. 5. – № 3. – С. 51-72.
- Мартынов, А. В. По обе стороны правды. Власовское движение и отечественная коллаборация. – М.: Вече, 2014. – 384 с.
- На заколдованных путях. Восточный поход (Философия войны) / Борис Хольмстон-Смысловский; Пер. с нем., вступ. ст. и комм. Д. А. Жукова и И. И. Ковтуна.] — М.: Галея-принт, 2014.
- Полян, П. М. От Вены до Вадуца: дневник интернированного коллаборанта Г. Томина (Симона) (з апреля - 2 октября 1945 Г.) / П. М. Полян // Журнал российских и восточноевропейских исторических исследований. – 2018. – № 3(14). – С. 131-162.
- Попов, А. В. Обзор личного архивного фонда Б. А. Смысловского в Национальном архиве княжества Лихтенштейн — Holmston-Smyslowsky, Arthur Graf von. 1831—1988 гг. // Вестник архивиста. — 2023. — № 3. — С. 876—891
- Попов, А. В. Пребывание в 1945–1947 гг. отряда Б. А. Смысловского в Лихтенштейне. По документам Национального архива Княжества Лихтенштейн (Landesarchiv des Fürstentums Liechtenstein) // Вестник архивиста. – 2023. – № 4. – С. 1067–1081.
