= List of castles in Liechtenstein =

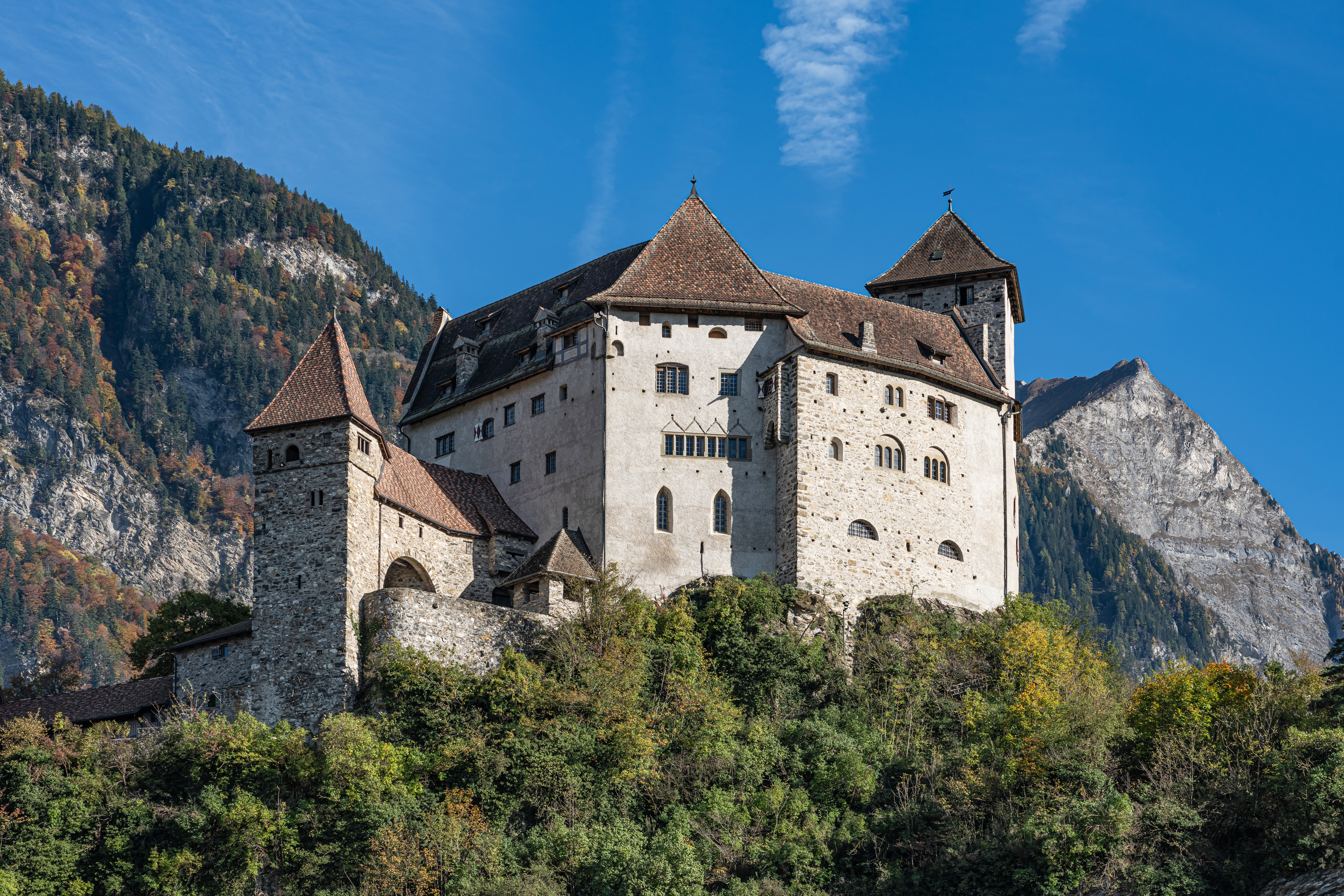
Gutenberg Castle

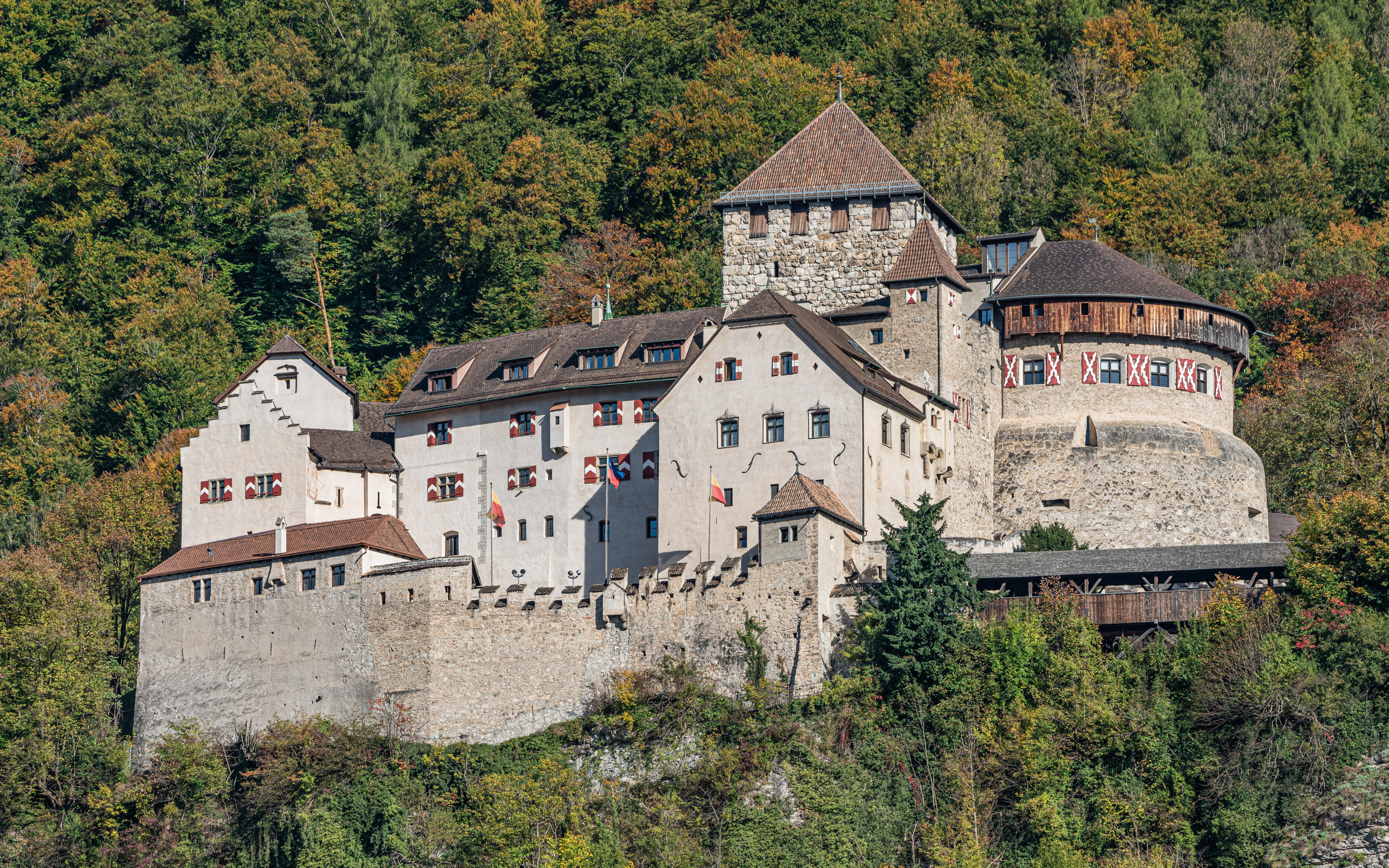
Vaduz Castle

There are five castles in Liechtenstein. Three of the castles are in ruins, with only Gutenberg Castle and Vaduz Castle still standing. Listed north to south, they are as follows:

- Obere Burg (Burg Neu-Schellenberg), in Schellenberg
- Untere Burg (Burg Alt-Schellenberg), in Schellenberg
- Vaduz Castle (Schloss Vaduz), in Vaduz
- Schalun Castle (Wildschloss), in Vaduz
- Gutenberg Castle (Burg Gutenberg), in Balzers

== See also ==
- List of castles
