= Vent d'est =

East Wind
- Vent d'est
- Directed by: Robert Enrico
- Written by: Robert Enrico; Frédéric H. Fajardie
- Based on: The Last Secret: Forcible repatriation to Russia, 1944–7 by Nicholas Bethell, 4th Baron Bethell
- Starring: Malcolm McDowell; Pierre Vaneck; Jean-François Balmer; Ludmila Mikaël
- Cinematography: Michel Abramowicz
- Edited by: Patricia Nény
- Music by: Karl Heinz Schäfer
- Release date: 20 January 1993
- Running time: 110 minutes
- Countries: France; Switzerland
- Language: French

Vent d'est ([vɑ̃ dɛst]; transl. East Wind) is a Franco-Swiss historical drama film directed by Robert Enrico, on a script co-written with Frédéric H. Fajardie, released in 1993.

== Plot ==
At the end of the Second World War, a regiment of the First Russian National Army, loyal to Nazi Germany, fled to neutral Liechtenstein to escape the Red Army.

Seeking asylum in Liechtenstein, these soldiers, along with some civilian associates, are warmly welcomed by the Liechtenstein government. Indeed, although returned by force in the country, Prince Franz Joseph II, Prince of Liechtenstein is understanding and accepts the refugees with the respect due to their rank of combatants. Russian General Boris Smyslovsky tries to monetize the surrender of his troops to U.S. Army rather than to the Red Army. He is working to take them to Argentina, a country where they will not be hunted down, but that is without counting on the hatred of the Soviets for these "traitors".

The film traces the efforts of the Liechtenstein authorities not to hand over these 400 refugees, and shows the lies and manipulations of the Soviets to convince them to return voluntarily. After promising them a new life as part of the reconstruction of the USSR, the Soviets managed to persuade about 200 of these men to return. On the return journey, the train stops in Hungary and all the "returnees" are murdered with machine guns.

== Cast ==
- Malcolm McDowell as General Boris Smyslovsky
- Pierre Vaneck as Dr. Josef Hoop, Prime Minister of Liechtenstein
- Jean-François Balmer as Father Anton Siegler, Speaker of the Parliament of Liechtenstein
- Ludmila Mikaël as Captain Barinkova
- Caroline Silhol as Countess Irène Smyslovsky
- Wojciech Pszoniak as Colonel Tcheko
- Annick Blancheteau as Madame Hoop
- Catherine Frot as Martha Hubner
- Catherine Bidaut as Natalya
- Serge Renko as Petrov Gregori
- Jean de Coninck as Mr. Brandt
- Geneviève Mnich as Mrs. Brandt
- Clémentine Célarié as Anna
- Elena Safonova as Princess of Liechtenstein
- Patrice Alexsandre as Franz Joseph II, Prince of Liechtenstein,
- Gilles Treton as Peter Hubber
