= Historical Lexicon of the Principality of Liechtenstein =

Encyclopedia on the history of Liechtenstein

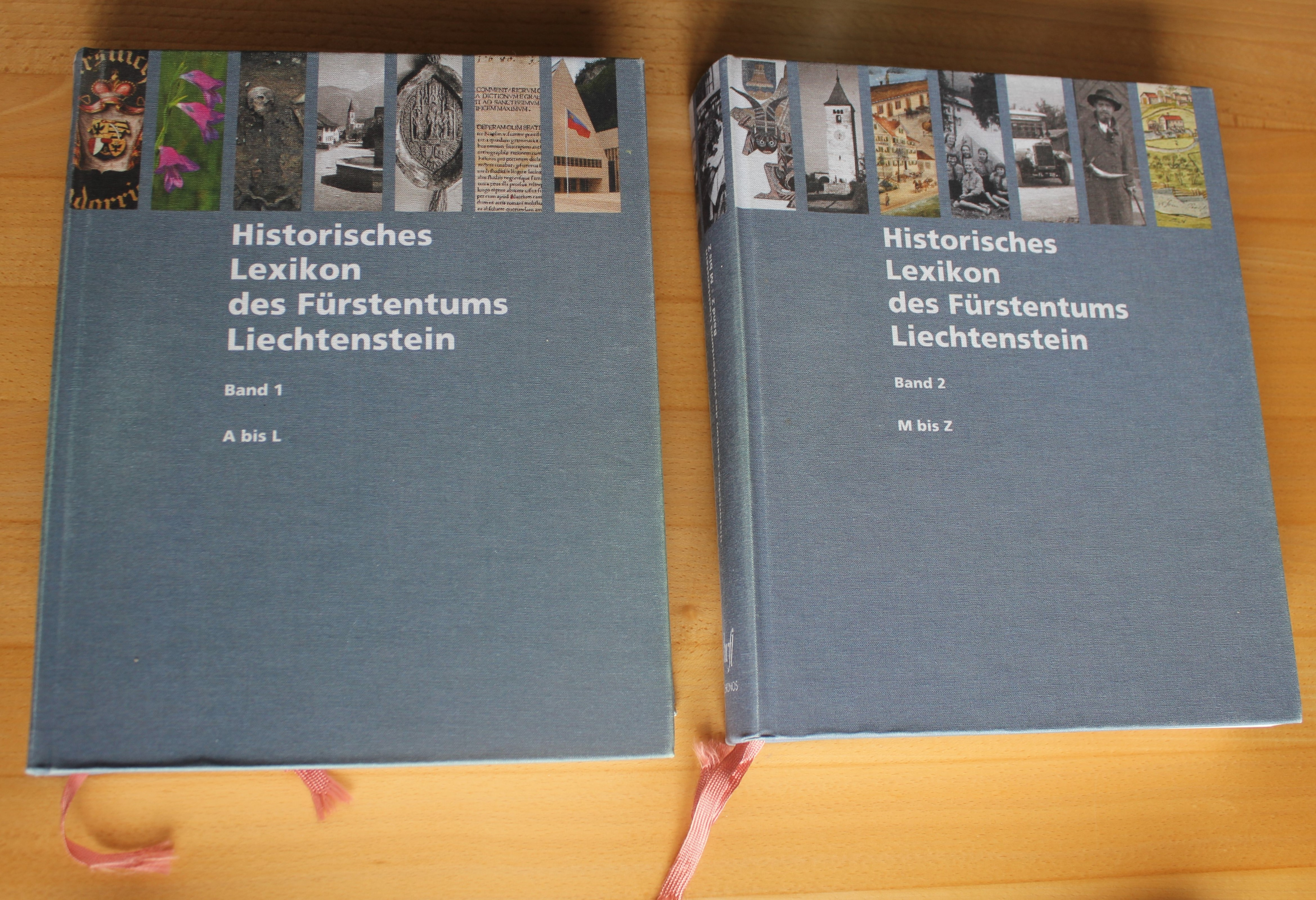
- The two HLFL volumes
- Available in: German
- Owner: Liechtenstein Institute
- Website: historisches-lexikon.li
- Registration: No
- Launched: 28 January 2013; 13 years ago

The Historical Lexicon of the Principality of Liechtenstein (German: Historisches Lexikon des Fürstentums Liechtenstein) is an encyclopedia on the history of Liechtenstein, first published in 2013 and available for free on the internet since 2018.

== History ==
The project was heavily inspired by the Historical Dictionary of Switzerland. In 1990 historian Arthur Brunhart became editor in chief of the project, then project manager from 2001 to 2013. Supported by a scientific advisory board that met twice a year, Brunhart was the sole editor responsible for implementing the project from 1990 onwards. He initiated four Liechtenstein seminars ranging from 1994 to 1996 held at the universities of Zurich, Freiburg, Innsbruck and Salzburg respectively dedicated to the development of the historical lexicon.

As it became apparent that human resources were limited in the development of the project, it was transferred to the Liechtenstein government after the Landtag of Liechtenstein had approved to fund the project in 2000. From 2001 three historians, up to seven upon publication, formed an editorial team to develop the project, including notable historians such as Peter Geiger and Rupert Quaderer. The completion deadline was set to December 2011, with the historical lexicon first being released in two volumes in January 2013 by Swiss publisher Chronos Verlag.

== Contents and versions ==
The historical lexicon contains thematic articles, geography, general history and biographical articles relating to Liechtenstein. As of its publication, it had 1142 pages which contains 2600 articles, 510 photos and 232 other illustrations.

The Liechtenstein Institute started to work on digitizing the two volumes in September 2016 in accordance with the Liechtenstein government. The technical concept for implementing this project was based on a MediaWiki solution. It has been available online since 13 November 2018 and printed additions are no longer planned. The institute is now the sole owner of the historical lexicon, supported by funding from the government, and updates it accordingly.
