= Oberburg =

Oberburg may refer to:

- Oberburg, Bern, a municipality in Switzerland
- Gornji Grad, Gornji Grad (German: Oberburg), a town in Slovenia
- Oberburg, Kobern, a hill castle in Rhineland-Palatinate, Germany
- Boosenburg, Hesse, Germany
- Part of Regensberg Castle, Regensberg, Switzerland

== See also ==
- Inner bailey, or inner ward, the strongly fortified enclosure at the heart of a medieval castle
- Obere Burg, a castle ruin in Schellenberg, Liechtenstein
- Obernburg, a town in Bavaria, Germany
