= Schellenberg =

- Municipality
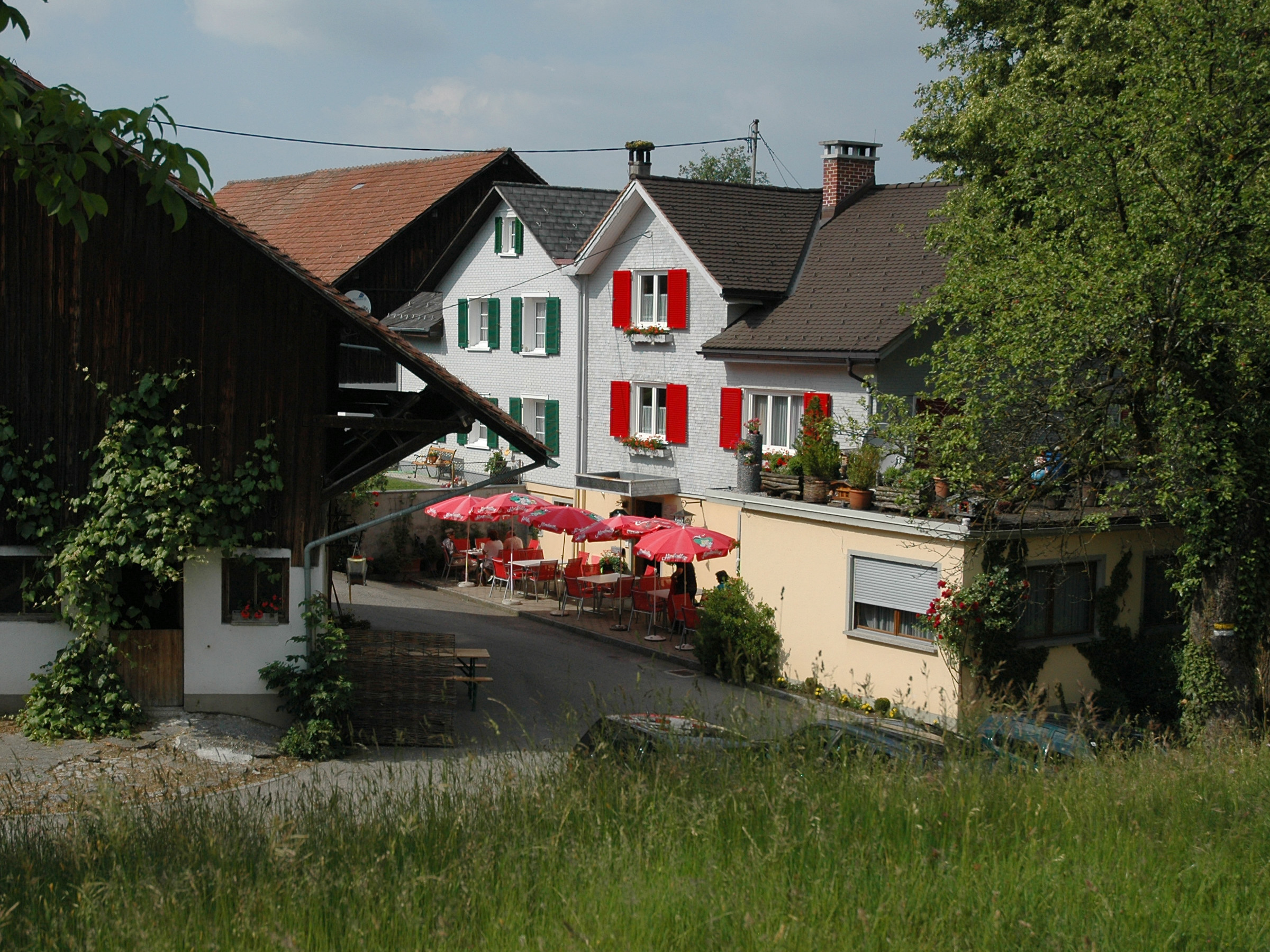
- Schellenberg in early-June 2007

- Flag Coat of arms

- Schellenberg within Liechtenstein
- Interactive map of Schellenberg
- Coordinates: 47°14′0.98″N 9°32′53.01″E
- Country: Liechtenstein
- Electoral district: Unterland
- Villages: Hinterschellenberg

Government
  - Mayor: Dietmar Lampert (VU)

Area
  - Total: 3.5 km^{2} (1.4 sq mi)
- Elevation: 626 m (2,054 ft)

Population (31-12-2019)
  - Total: 1,107
  - Density: 294/km^{2} (760/sq mi)
- Time zone: UTC+1 (CET)
  - Summer (DST): UTC+2 (CEST)
- Postal code: 9488
- Area code: 7011
- ISO 3166 code: LI-08
- Website: www.schellenberg.li

Schellenberg (Swiss Standard German pronunciation: [ˈʃɛlənˌbɛrɡ]; dialectal: Schällabärg) is a municipality in the Unterland district of Liechtenstein. As of 2019, it has a population of 1,107 and covers an area of 3.5 km^{2} (1.4 sq mi).

== History ==
=== Early history ===
The area was first settled by Celts, then by Rhaetians. Tiberius (sent by Augustus) conquered the area in 15 BC, and made it part of the province of Rhaetia. The Province later became a county (countship) under Charlemagne. The county was repeatedly divided among heirs.

The Lordship of Schellenberg was purchased by the Counts of Vaduz in 1437 and the two states have been united in fact ever since. After the Swabian War in 1499, both came under Austrian suzerainty. Different dynasties of counts bought and sold them, until their purchase in the early 18th century by the Liechtenstein dynasty, which had been granted princely status in 1706, but which needed to acquire a territory with imperial immediacy in order to vote in the Diet of the Princes of the Empire. The emperor formally united Vaduz and Schellenberg in 1719 as the Principality of Liechtenstein.

=== World War II ===
The Russian Monument, located in Hinterschellenberg, in the municipality commemorates the asylum given to Russian soldiers during the Second World War. Near the end of World War II, Liechtenstein granted asylum to approximately five hundred soldiers of the First Russian National Army, a collaborationist Russian force within the German Wehrmacht. This act was no small matter, as the country was poor and had difficulty feeding and caring for such a large group of refugees. Eventually, Argentina agreed to resettle the asylum seekers permanently. In contrast, the British repatriated the Russians who fought on the German side to the USSR.

== Politics ==
Schellenberg is administered by the mayor and a 9-person municipal council, elected every four years since 1975. The incumbent mayor is Dietmar Lampert, since 2023.

=== Last election ===
Party	Votes	%	Seats	+/–
Progressive Citizens' Party	1,988	47.15	4	0
Patriotic Union	1,733	41.11	3	0
Free List	495	11.74	1	0
Total	4,216	100.00	8	0
Valid votes	527	95.13		
Invalid votes	12	2.17		
Blank votes	15	2.71		
Total votes	554	100.00		
Registered voters/turnout	648	85.49		
Source: Gemeindewahlen

== Geography ==
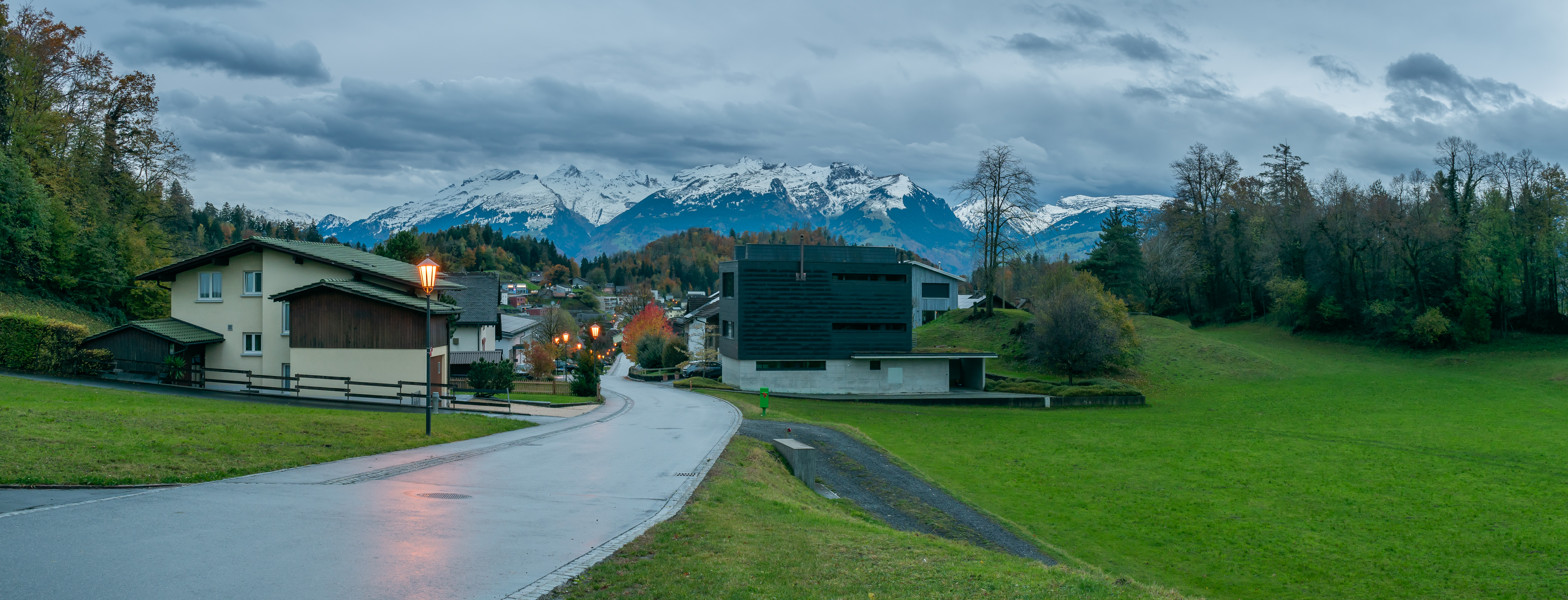
Schellenberg in 2023

At 3.558 km^{2}, Schellenberg is the smallest municipality by area in Liechtenstein. Its territory borders the Liechtensteiner municipalities of Eschen, Gamprin, Mauren and Ruggell. It borders also with the Austrian municipality of Feldkirch, in the federal state of Vorarlberg.

The highest point is a location known as the Klocker, the highest point of Eschnerberg, at 698 meters above sea level, while the lowest point is the Schellenberger Riet at 432 meters.

The village of Schellenberg consists of the Weiler (hamlets) of Loch, Platta, Mittel-Schellenberg, Hinderschloss, and Hinter-Schellenberg. The municipality also contains the castle ruins of Obere Burg and Untere Burg.

== Transport ==
In Schellenberg there is a small road crossing to Austria, overseen by border guards until 1987.

== Notable people ==
- Gisela Biedermann (born 1948), physician and politician
- Julia Hassler (born 1993), Olympic swimmer.
- Fabienne Wohlwend (born 1997), motor racing driver.
