= Schalun Castle =

Castle ruin located in the municipality of Vaduz, Liechtenstein

- Burg Schalun (in German)
- Alternative names: Ruine Schalun, Wildschloss

General information
- Type: Ruined castle
- Location: Vaduz, Liechtenstein
- Coordinates: 47.1509°N 9.5336°E
- Construction started: built around the end of the 12th century, first written record from 1237
- Owner: Municipality of Vaduz

Schalun Castle (German Burg Schalun or Ruine Schalun), also known colloquially as Wildschloss ("Castle in the wild"), is a castle ruin located in the municipality of Vaduz, Liechtenstein. It lies in the mountains, roughly 1 kilometer to the northeast from the town centre of Vaduz, the capital of Liechtenstein. It is freely open to tourists and accessible by foot or mountain bike via a local footpath. Schalun Castle is one of the five existing castles in Liechtenstein and one of the three ruined ones in the country.

== History ==
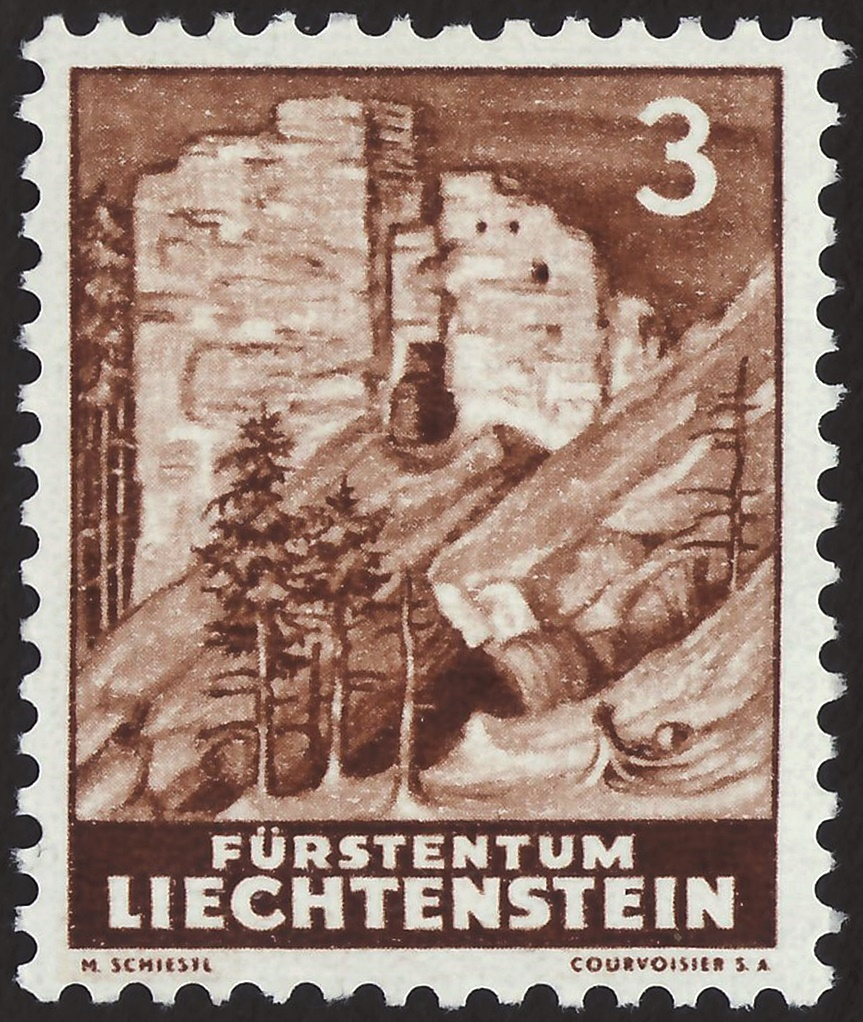
Schalun Castle on a 1937 Liechtenstein stamp

The castle was constructed probably around the end of the 12th century. The first written record about the castle comes from 1237. In it, it was also first referred to by name, as "Schalun". Archeological digs made in recent decades have revealed only small amounts of artifacts from the medieval and early modern period, suggesting that the castle might have been cleared and burned down at a later point in its history.

In the 18th century, the castle came into the possession of the then Prince Regnant of Liechtenstein. The ownership of the castle ruin was handed over to the Municipality of Vaduz in 1933.

Today, the best preserved parts of the castle are its grand hall and the remaining section of its keep.

== See also ==
- List of castles in Liechtenstein
