= Hinterschellenberg =

- Hamlet
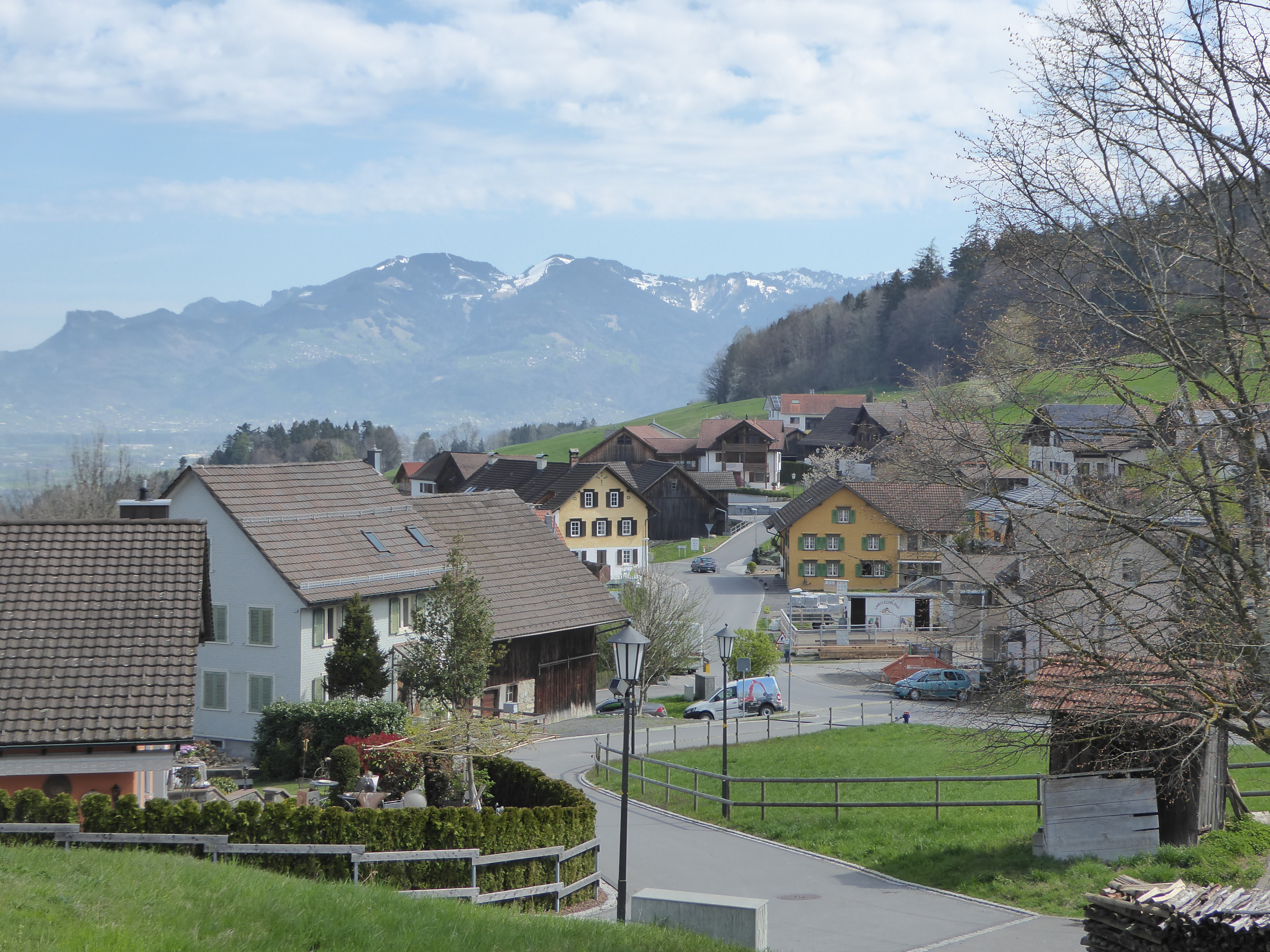
- Hinterschellenberg in 2019

- Locator map of Hinterschellenberg in Liechtenstein
- Coordinates: 47°14′26.9″N 9°33′34.7″E
- Country: Liechtenstein
- Electoral district: Unterland
- Municipality: Schellenberg
- Elevation: 620 m (2,030 ft)
- Time zone: UTC+1 (CET)
  - Summer (DST): UTC+2 (CEST)
- Postal code: 9488
- Area code: 423

Hinterschellenberg is a settlement in Schellenberg, Liechtenstein.

== Geography ==
Hinterschellenberg is located in the town of Schellenberg, a few kilometres away from its downtown core.

== Main sights ==
Hinterschellenberg contains the Catholic Chapel of St. George (German: Kapelle St. Georg).

It is home to Liechtenstein's Russian monument (German: Russen-Denkmal), erected in 1980. Translated into English, the inscription on the monument reads as follows:

Here in Hinterschellenberg, on the night of 2 May 1945, the asylum-seeking remainder of the "1st Russian National Army of the German Wehrmacht" under Major General A. Holmston-Smyslowsky, with about 500 fully equipped men, crossed the border of the Greater German Reich into Liechtenstein. The first negotiations took place in the "Wirtschaft zum Löwen" tavern, which led to the granting of asylum by the Principality of Liechtenstein. It was the only country which resisted the Soviet Union's extradition demands. After two and a half years, the Russians were free to leave for a country of their choice.

The monument is marked on a map given out by the Liechtenstein tourist information service, available free in Vaduz. The Wirtschaft zum Löwen Tavern is a small bar directly behind the monument. The Austrian border is about one hundred metres beyond the memorial stone.

== Gallery ==
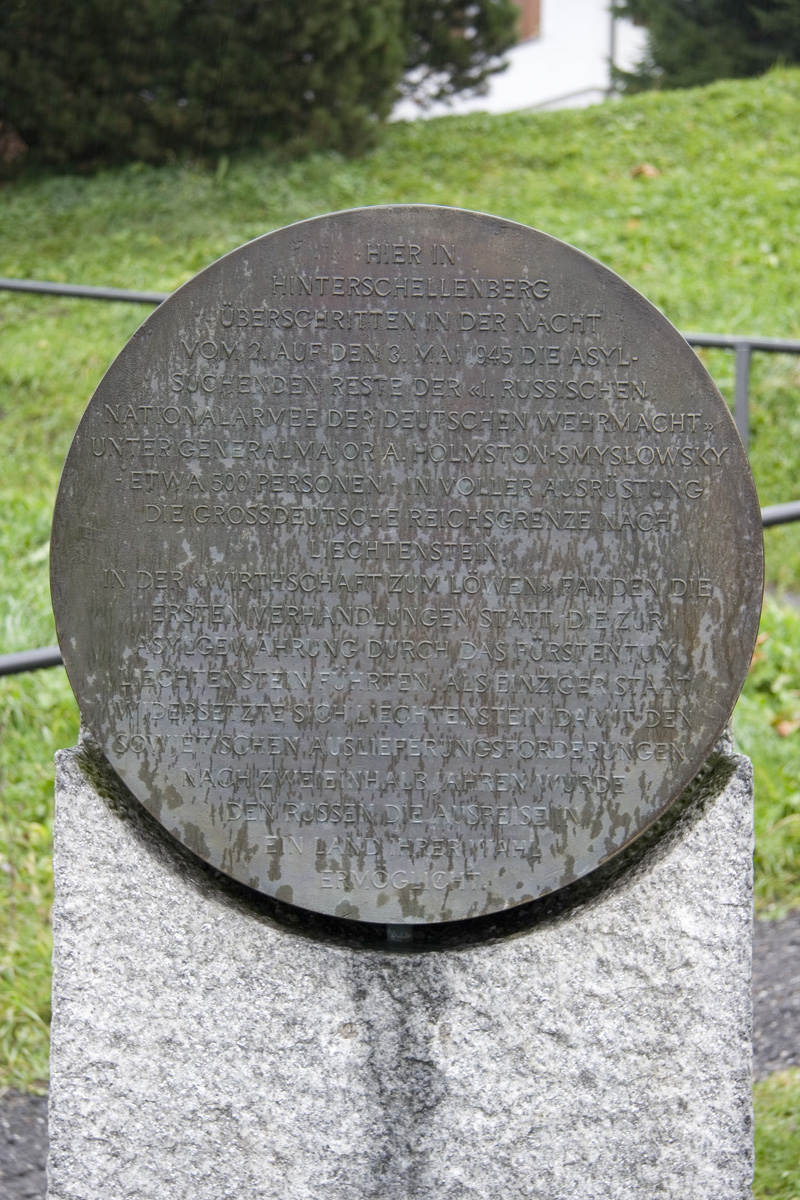
The monument to Russian soldiers

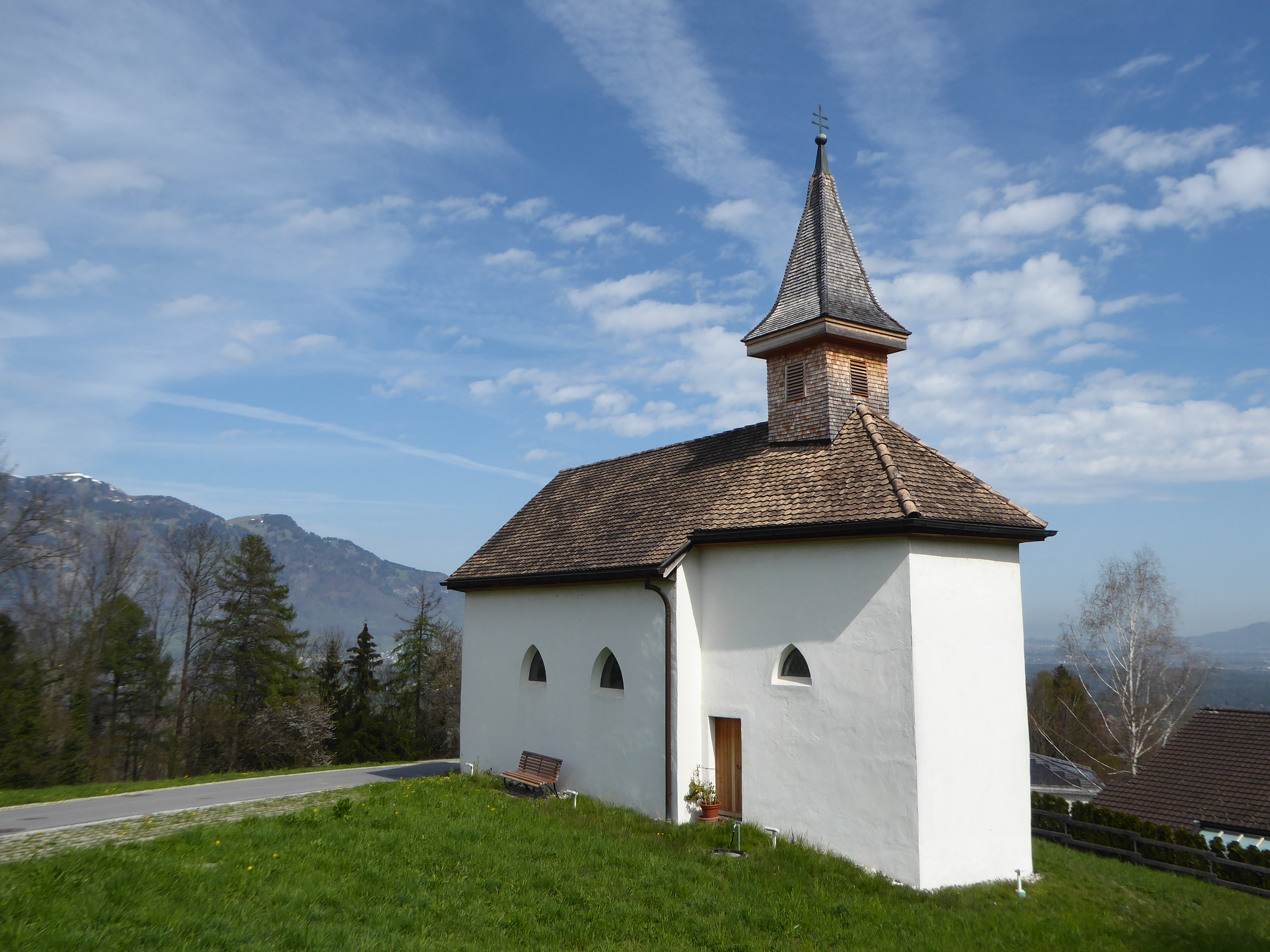
Chapel of St. George
