= Chronos Verlag =

Swiss book publisher

Chronos Verlag AG

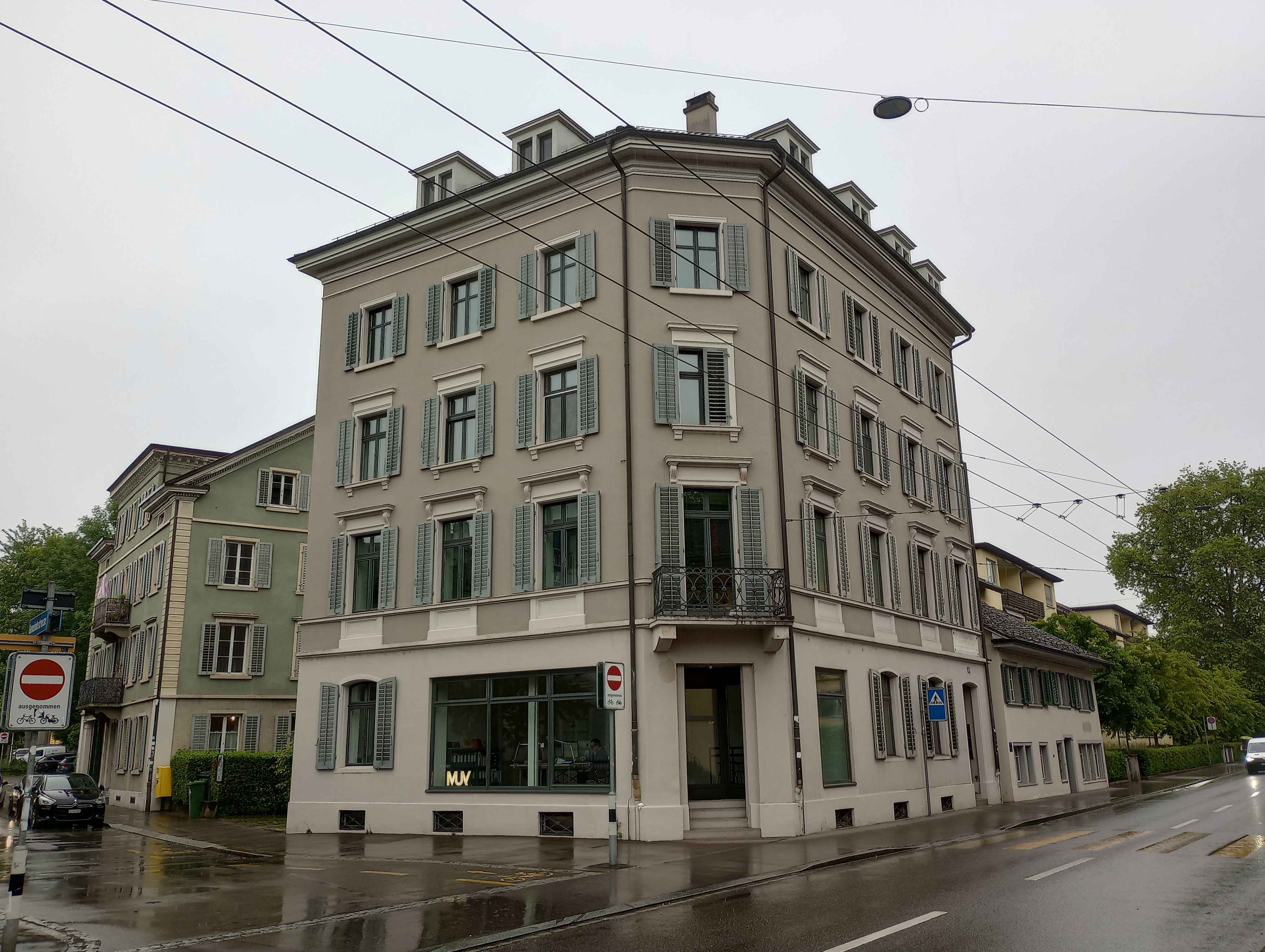
- Chronos Verlag headquarters in Zürich
- Industry: Book publishing
- Founded: 1985
- Headquarters: Zeltweg 27, 8032 Zürich, Switzerland
- Website: www.chronos-verlag.ch

Chronos Publishing AG is a book publishing company based in Zürich, Switzerland.

The company specialises in social history with notable publications such as studies of the Bergier commission in 2001 and the Historical Lexicon of the Principality of Liechtenstein in 2013.
