= Medal for Gallantry and Merit for Members of the Eastern Peoples =

Nazi German decoration for Eastern volunteers

Medal for Gallantry and Merit for Members of the Eastern Peoples Tapferkeits und Verdienstauszeichnung für Ostvölker
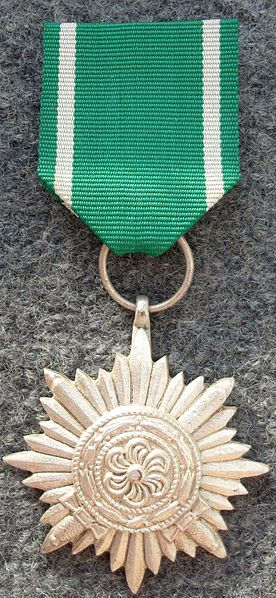
- Ostvolk Medal 2nd class in silver with swords
- Type: Military and paramilitary award
- Awarded for: Bravery (with swords); or Merit (without swords)
- Presented by: Reich Ministry for the Occupied Eastern Territories and the Wehrmacht
- Eligibility: Former Soviet citizens under German command Germans serving in units manned by former Soviet personnel
- Status: Obsolete
- Established: 14 July 1942

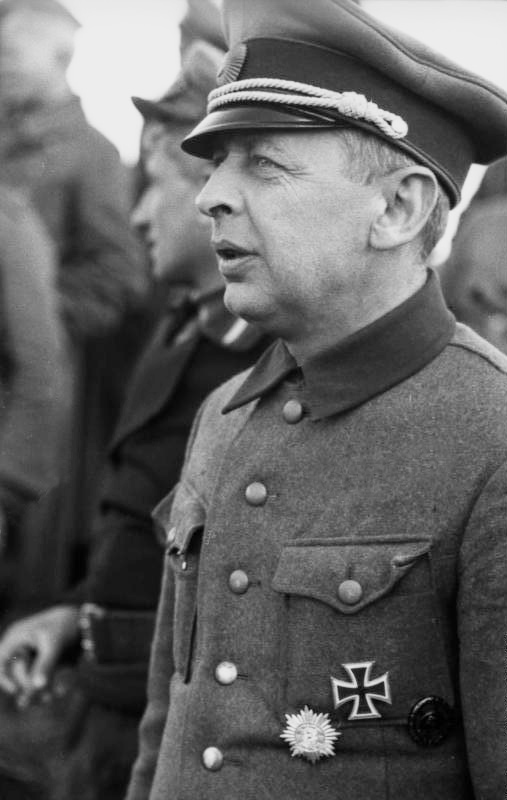
Bronislav Kaminski wearing the 1st class of the award on his tunic below and to the left of the Iron Cross

Medal for Gallantry and Merit for Members of the Eastern Peoples (German: Tapferkeits und Verdienstauszeichnung für Ostvölker) was a military and paramilitary award of Nazi Germany. Established on 14 July 1942, it was bestowed on personnel from the former Soviet Union (Ostvolk in German, literally "Eastern people") who volunteered to fight alongside German forces. The medal is sometimes called the Ostvolk Medal or Eastern People's Medal, (German: Ostvolkmedaille).

In addition to the Ostvolk medal, eastern volunteers were also eligible for German war medals and badges.

The Ostvolk medal features an octagonal (eight pointed) star with a plant pattern in the centre. There were two classes:

- 1st class - 50 mm in diameter, attached to the left uniform pocket by a pin and clasp. It could be awarded in gold or silver.
- 2nd class - 40 mm in diameter worn on a 32 mm wide ribbon from the left chest. It could be awarded in gold, silver or bronze, each having a separate ribbon design:
  - gold: green with a red stripe towards each edge
  - silver: green with a white stripe towards each edge
  - bronze: plain green

Each version of both classes could be awarded either with swords for bravery or without swords for merit.

The 1st class was only awarded to those who had already received the 2nd class although, exceptionally, the two classes could be awarded together. Women, for example nurses, were also eligible for the medal.

From November 1942, German officers and NCOs serving with Ostvolk units were eligible for the 1st class and 2nd class in silver with swords, provided they held the corresponding class of the Iron Cross. In February 1944, German personnel became eligible for the 1st class and 2nd class without swords where they held the corresponding class of the War Merit Cross with swords.

The wearing of Nazi-era awards was banned in 1945. In 1957 the Eastern People's Medal was among the World War II decorations re-authorised for wear by the Federal Republic of Germany. While many awards were redesigned to remove the swastika, the original Eastern People's Medal could be worn unaltered, as it did not bear this symbol.

== Classes ==
Medal for Gallantry and Merit for Members of the Eastern Peoples
		I. class		II. class		
		... in gold	... in silver	... in gold	... in silver	... in bronze
		With swords	Without swords		With swords	
Ribbon bar	with swords					
Ribbon bar	without ...					
