= Untere Burg =

Castle ruin located in the municipality of Schellenberg, Liechtenstein

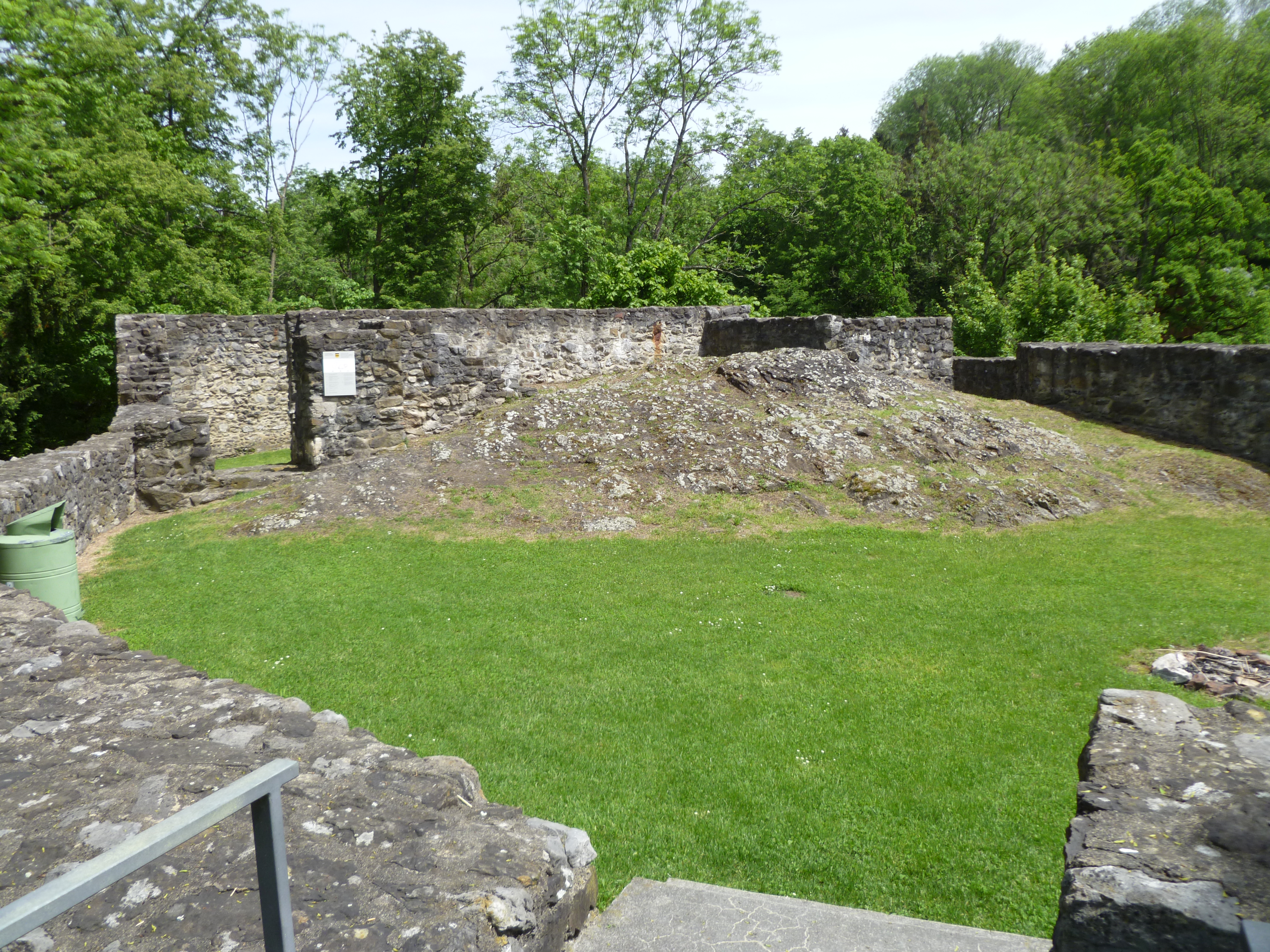
- View of castle ruins and inner ward from current access gate (Tor 2)
- Interactive map of the Untere Burg area
- Alternative names: Burg Alt-Schellenberg

General information
- Type: Ruined castle
- Location: Schellenberg, Liechtenstein
- Coordinates: 47.2332°N 9.5424°E
- Construction started: built around 1250, first written record from 1317
- Owner: Historischer Verein für das Fürstentum Liechtenstein (Historical Association of the Principality of Liechtenstein)

Untere Burg ("Lower Castle"), also known colloquially as Burg Alt-Schellenberg ("Castle of Alt-Schellenberg"), is a castle ruin located in the municipality of Schellenberg, Liechtenstein. It lies at the edge of a local forest, a few hundred metres north of the main road between Vorderer Schellenberg and Mittleler Schellenberg (two of the burroughs in the village of Alt-Schellenberg). It is freely open to tourists and accessible by foot or mountain bike via a local footpath. Untere Burg is one of the five existing castles in Liechtenstein and one of the three ruined ones in the country.

== History ==
Untere Burg is the smaller and newer one of the two ruined castles in the Municipality of Schellenberg. Its construction was finished around 1250. Its first appearance in written records is from 1317. The castle reached the pinnacle of its structural expansion around the year 1350. According to current estimates, it was inhabited until roughly the 16th century, when it was abandoned and ceased to function as a residence. In the following centuries, the castle lost its military purpose and became a ruin.

In 1956, Franz Joseph II, Prince of Liechtenstein handed over ownership of the heavily overgrown ruin to the Historisches Verein für das Fürstentum Liechtenstein (Historical Association of the Principality of Liechtenstein). This institution is the current owner and caretaker of the ruin and oversees its research, upkeep and preservation.

== Gallery ==
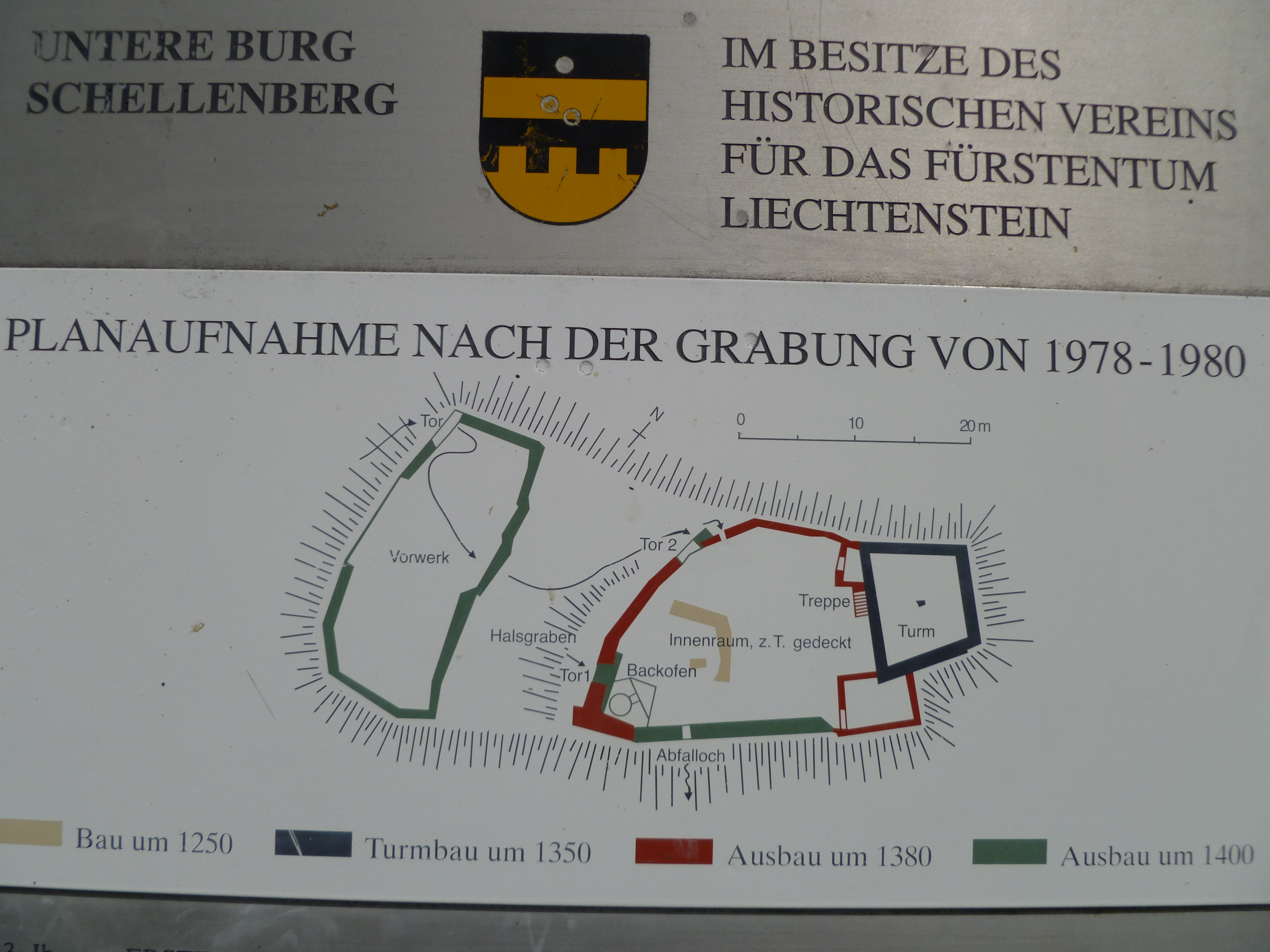
Map of the castle

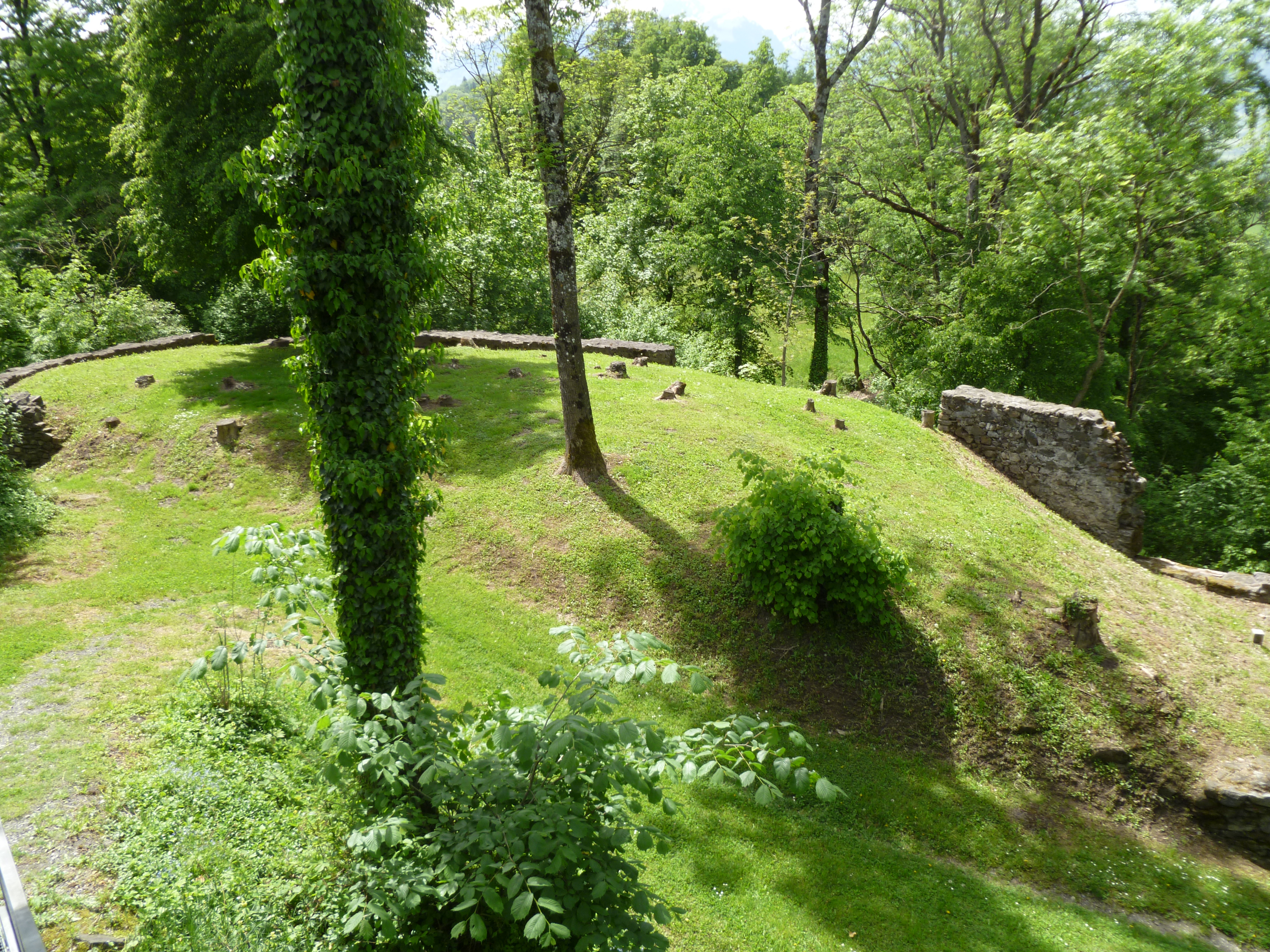
Outer bailey (dating ca. 1400) with outer gate (far right)

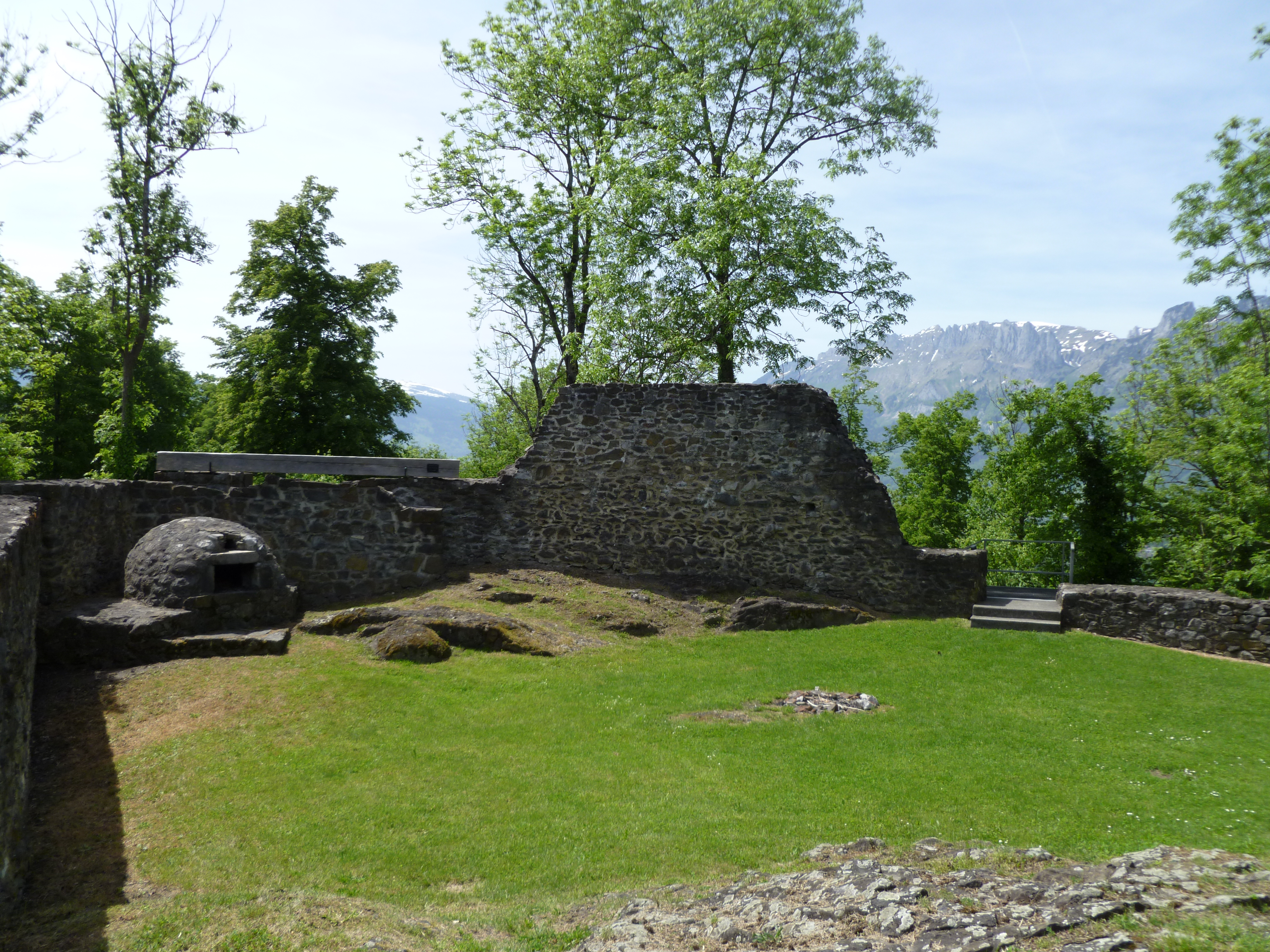
Inner ward with medieval baking oven (far left) and current access gate (Tor 2) on the right

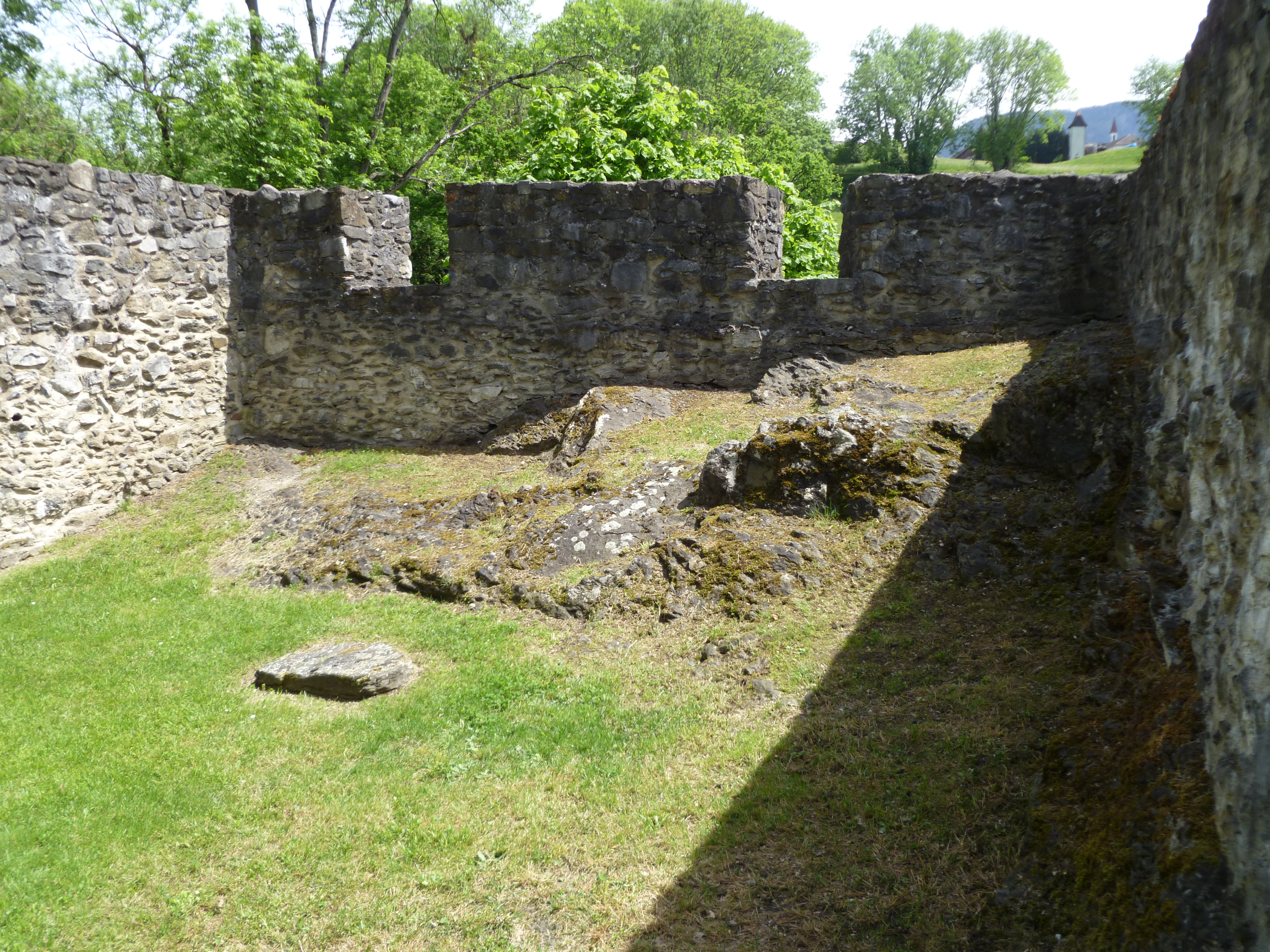
Tower (Turm), added ca. 1350

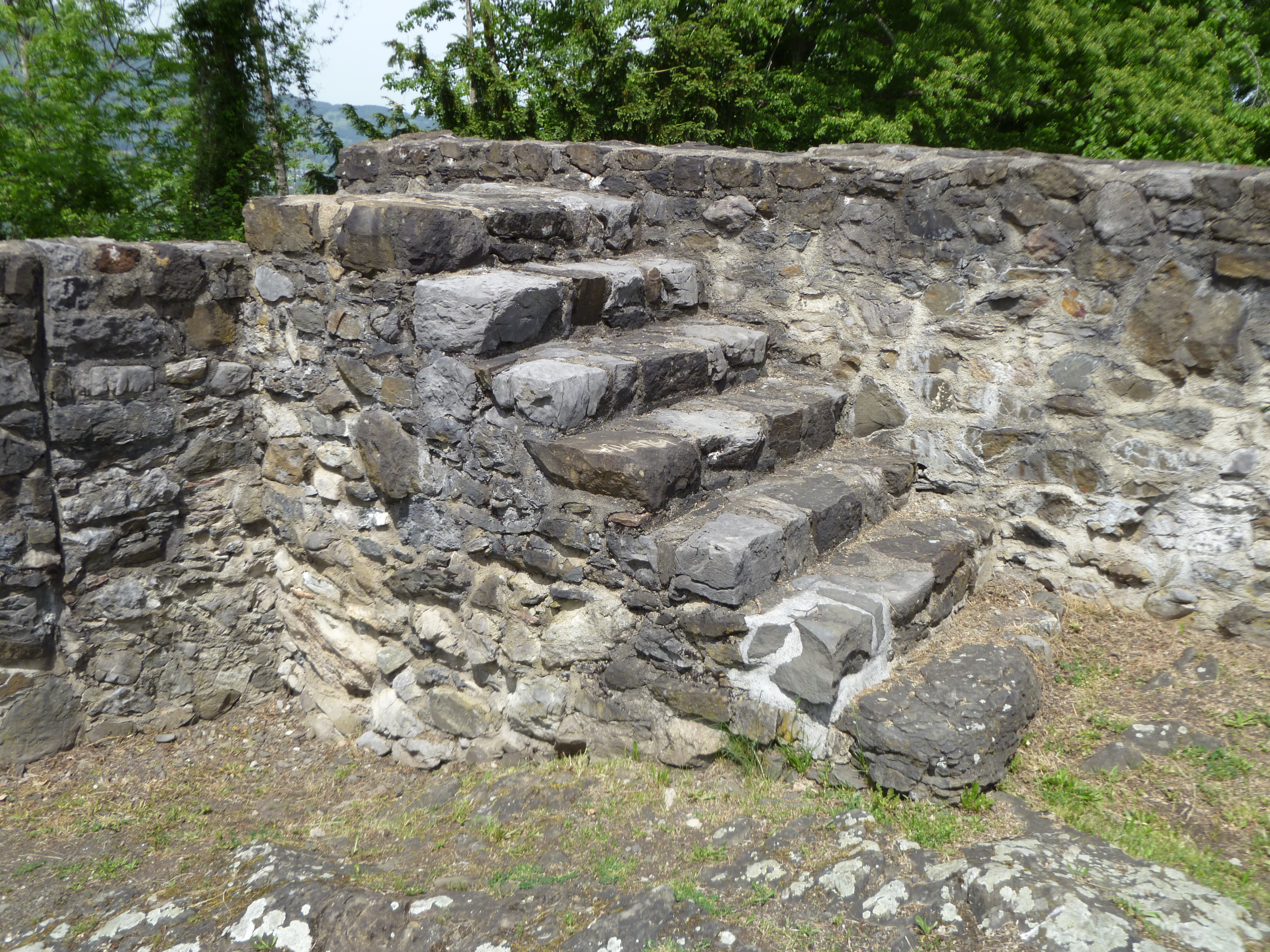
Medieval stairs (Treppe)

== See also ==
- Obere Burg - The other castle ruin in the municipality of Schellenberg.
- List of castles in Liechtenstein
