= Qaleh-ye Bala =

Qaleh-ye Bala or Qaleh-e Bala or Qaleh Bala or Qalehbala (Persian: قَلعِۀ بالا, meaning "Upper Castle") may refer to:

- Qaleh-ye Bala, East Azerbaijan, Iran
- Qaleh-ye Bala, Bostanabad, East Azerbaijan Province, Iran
- Qaleh-ye Bala, Fars
- Qaleh-ye Bala, Isfahan
- Farahabad, Kashmar, in Razavi Khorasan Province, Iran
- Qaleh-ye Bala, Kerman, in Bam County, Kerman Province, Iran
- Qaleh-ye Bala, Semnan, in Shahrud County, Semnan Province, Iran
- Hesar-e Shalpush, in Tehran Province, Iran
- Qaleh Bala, Tehran, in Tehran Province, Iran
- Saruqi, in Markazi Province, Iran
- Qaleh-ye Bala, Yazd
