= First Russian National Army =

- German: 1. Russische Nationalarmee; Russian: 1ая Русская национальная армия
- Patch of the First Russian National Army
- Active: July 1941 (Sonderdivision Russland); 4 April 1945 to the middle April 1945
- Allegiance: Germany
- Branch: German Army
- Size: 6,000–10,000 troops

Commanders
- Notable commanders: Boris Smyslovsky

The 1st Russian National Army was a Russian pro-Axis army under Boris Smyslovsky, a Russian-Finnish aristocrat and former Tsarist military officer, during World War II.

== History ==
=== Origins ===
Before 1945, the Army was known as Sonderdivision Russland (German: Special Division Russia), an organisation composed of White emigrants, who trained prisoners of war and defectors from the Red Army to obtain information about the partisan movement, like the names of the main leaders and their locations. The group participated in anti-partisan operations in occupied Eastern Europe.

Initially part of the Nazi German Wehrmacht, Smyslovsky's forces were elevated to the 1st Russian National Army on 10 March 1945. On 4 April 1945 it received a status of the independent allied army. Liechtenstein was the only state which denied Soviet demands for the extradition of Russians who fought on the side of the Axis powers.

=== Retreat and repatriation ===
By April 1945, Smyslovsky had moved his remaining fighters to Feldkirch where he met Grand Duke Vladimir Cyrillovich, the Romanov claimant to the Russian Imperial Crown. The whittled-down army of 462 men, 30 women, and 2 children then moved into neutral Liechtenstein on 2 May 1945; the Grand Duke, however, decided to stay in the US occupied zone in Austria because neither Liechtenstein nor Switzerland would issue him a visa. The Russians were cared for by the Liechtenstein Red Cross. On 16 August 1945, a Soviet delegation came to Liechtenstein in an attempt to repatriate the Russians.

Homesick and subject to cajoling and menacing, about 200 of the group agreed to return. They departed in a train to Vienna and nothing was ever heard of them again. The remainder stayed in Liechtenstein for another year, resisting with support of Liechtenstein further pressure by the Soviet government to participate in the repatriation program. Eventually the government of Argentina offered asylum, and about a hundred people left.

According to Alexander Frick, Prime Minister of Liechtenstein (1945–1962), the Russians were at no point in danger of being extradited, and the local population fully supported the government in providing asylum to the Russians. The small population of the country (12,141 in 1945) supported the émigrés (4% of the population) at a rate of CHF 30,000 per month for two years and paid their costs to move to Argentina; they did not know that these costs were later to be reimbursed by Germany. Western Allies and other countries in Europe complied with Soviet requests to repatriate Soviet citizens regardless of their individual wishes. Liechtenstein was the only country that rejected this demand and informed the Soviet government that only those Russians who wanted to go home would be sent back.

A monument for these Russians was erected in Hinterschellenberg, Liechtenstein in 1980.

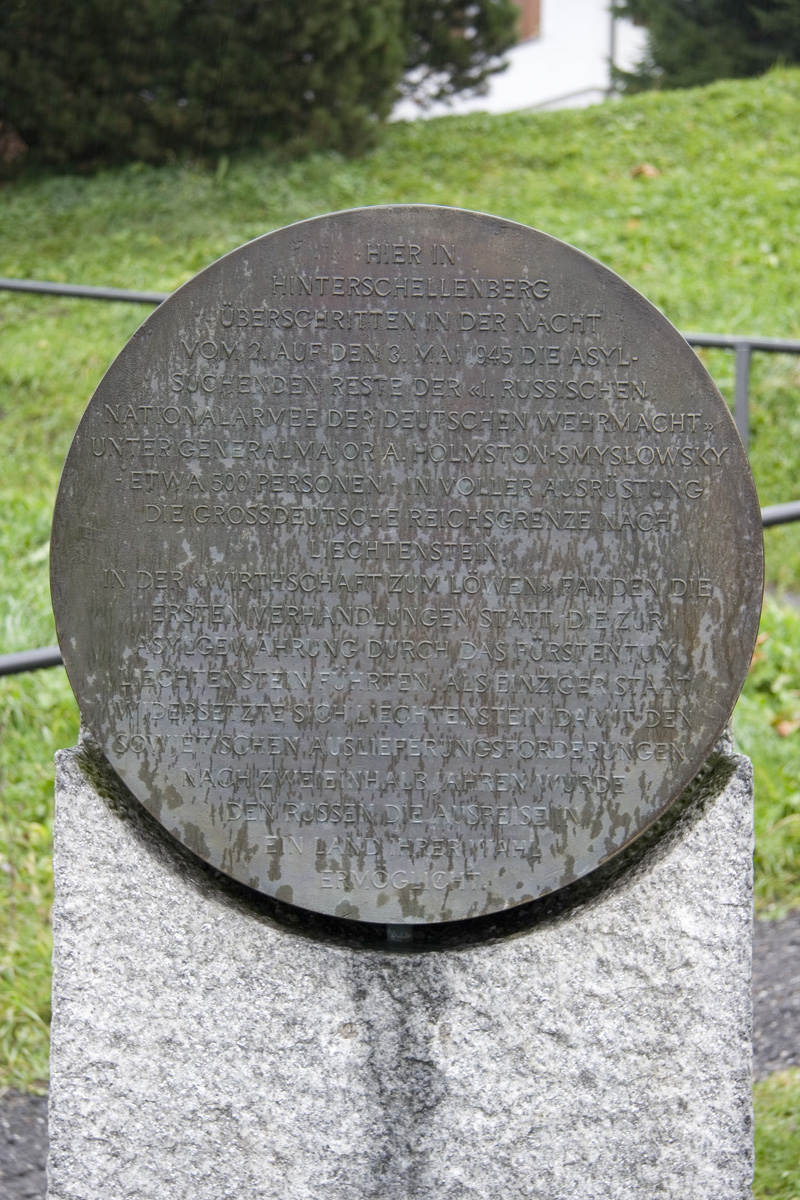
Translated into English, the inscription on the monument reads as follows: Here in Hinterschellenberg, on the night of 2 May 1945, the asylum-seeking remainder of the "1st Russian National Army of the German Wehrmacht" under Major General A. Holmston-Smyslowsky, with about 500 fully equipped men, crossed the border of the Greater German Reich into Liechtenstein. The first negotiations took place in the "Wirtschaft zum Löwen" tavern, which led to the granting of asylum by the Principality of Liechtenstein. It was the only country which resisted the Soviet Union's extradition demands. After two and a half years, the Russians were free to leave for a country of their choice. The monument is marked on a map given out by the Liechtenstein tourist information service, available free in Vaduz. The Wirtschaft zum Löwen Tavern is a small bar directly behind the monument. The Austrian border is about one hundred metres beyond the memorial stone.

== See also ==
- Collaboration with the Axis powers
- Collaboration in the German-occupied Soviet Union
- Russian Liberation Army
- Vent d'est
