= Obere Burg =

Castle in Liechtenstein

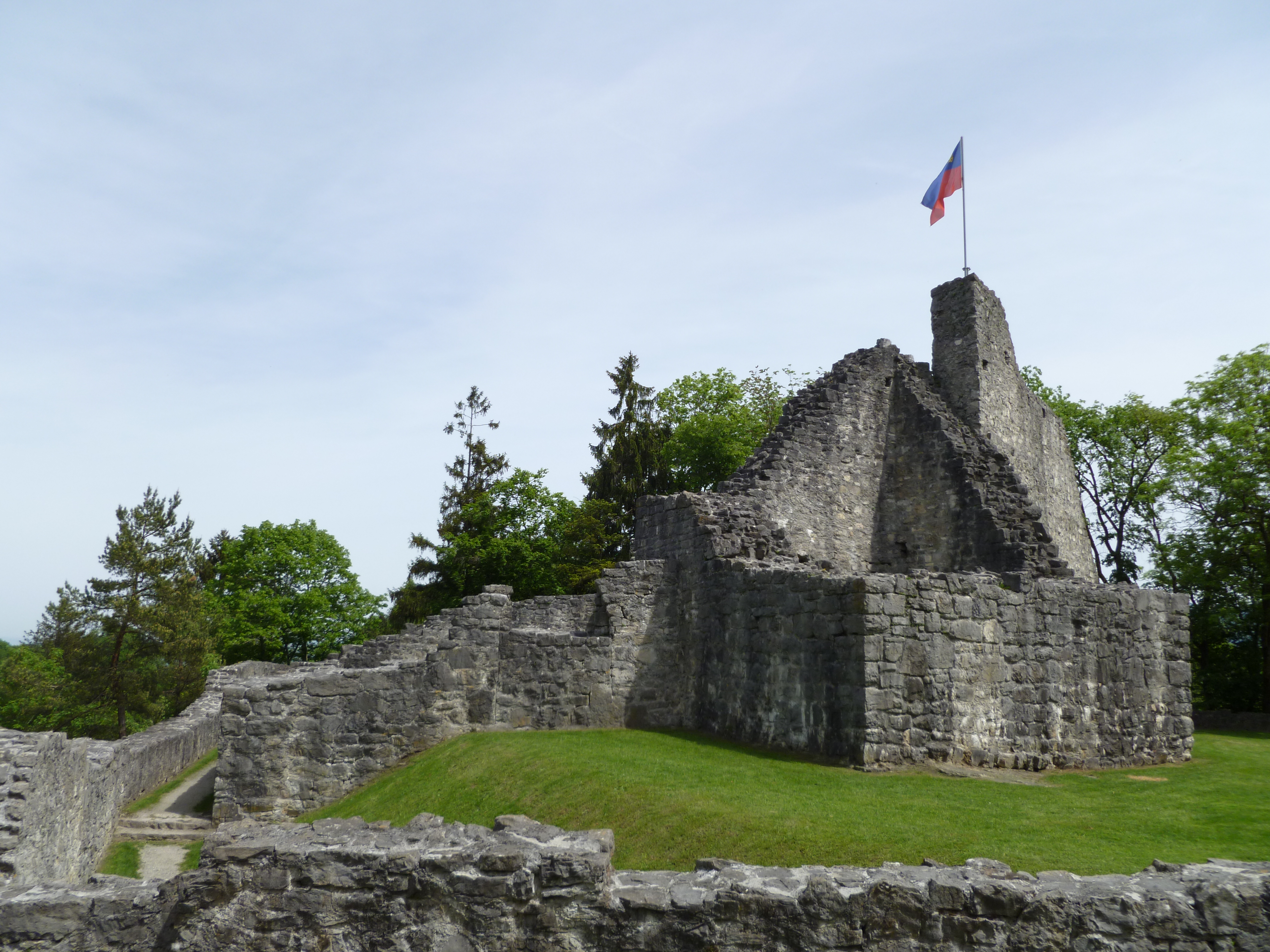
- Interactive map of the Obere Burg area
- Alternative names: Burg Neu-Schellenberg

General information
- Type: Ruined castle
- Location: Schellenberg, Liechtenstein
- Coordinates: 47.2329°N 9.5542°E
- Construction started: built around 1200, first written record from 1348
- Owner: Historischer Verein für das Fürstentum Liechtenstein (Historical Association of the Principality of Liechtenstein)

Obere Burg ('Upper Castle'), also known colloquially as Burg Neu-Schellenberg ('Castle of Neu-Schellenberg'), is a castle ruin located in the municipality of Schellenberg, Liechtenstein. It lies at the western edge of Hinterschloss, one of the burroughs in the village of Neu-Schellenberg. It is freely open to tourists. Due to its close proximity to Hinterschloss, it is probably the most easily accessible of all Liechtenstein castles. Obere Burg is one of the five existing castles in Liechtenstein and one of the three ruined ones in the country.

== History ==
Obere Burg is the larger and older one of the two ruined castles in the Municipality of Schellenberg. Its construction was finished already around 1200. The castle's first appearance in written records occurred on 10 January 1348. According to current estimates, it was inhabited until roughly the 16th century, when it was abandoned and ceased to function as a residence. In the following centuries, the castle lost its military purpose and became a ruin. In 1956, Franz Joseph II, Prince of Liechtenstein handed over ownership of the heavily overgrown ruin to the Historisches Verein für das Fürstentum Liechtenstein (Historical Association of the Principality of Liechtenstein). This institution is the current owner and caretaker of the ruin and oversees its research, upkeep and preservation.

== Gallery ==
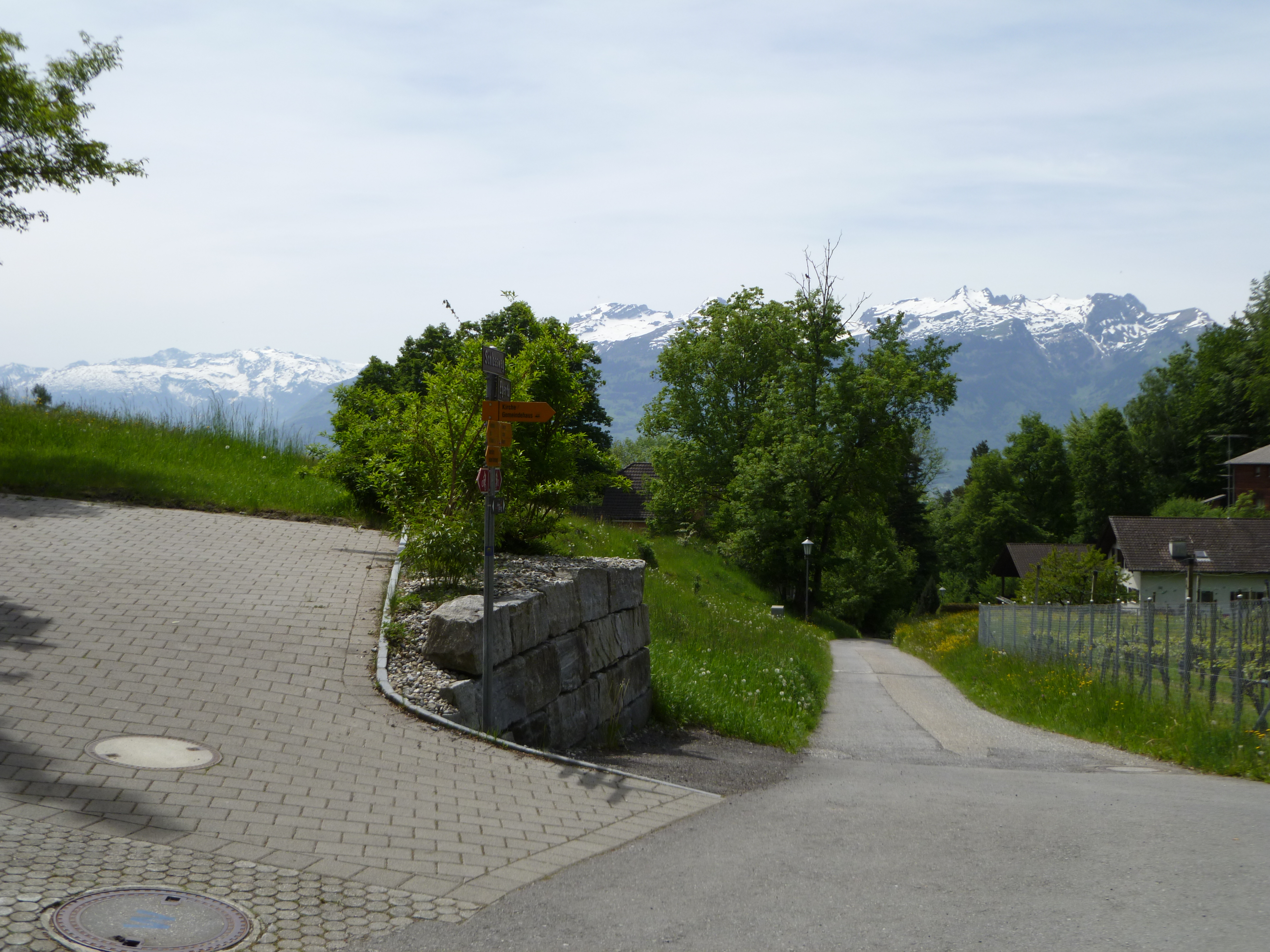
Walk way to the Castle ruins

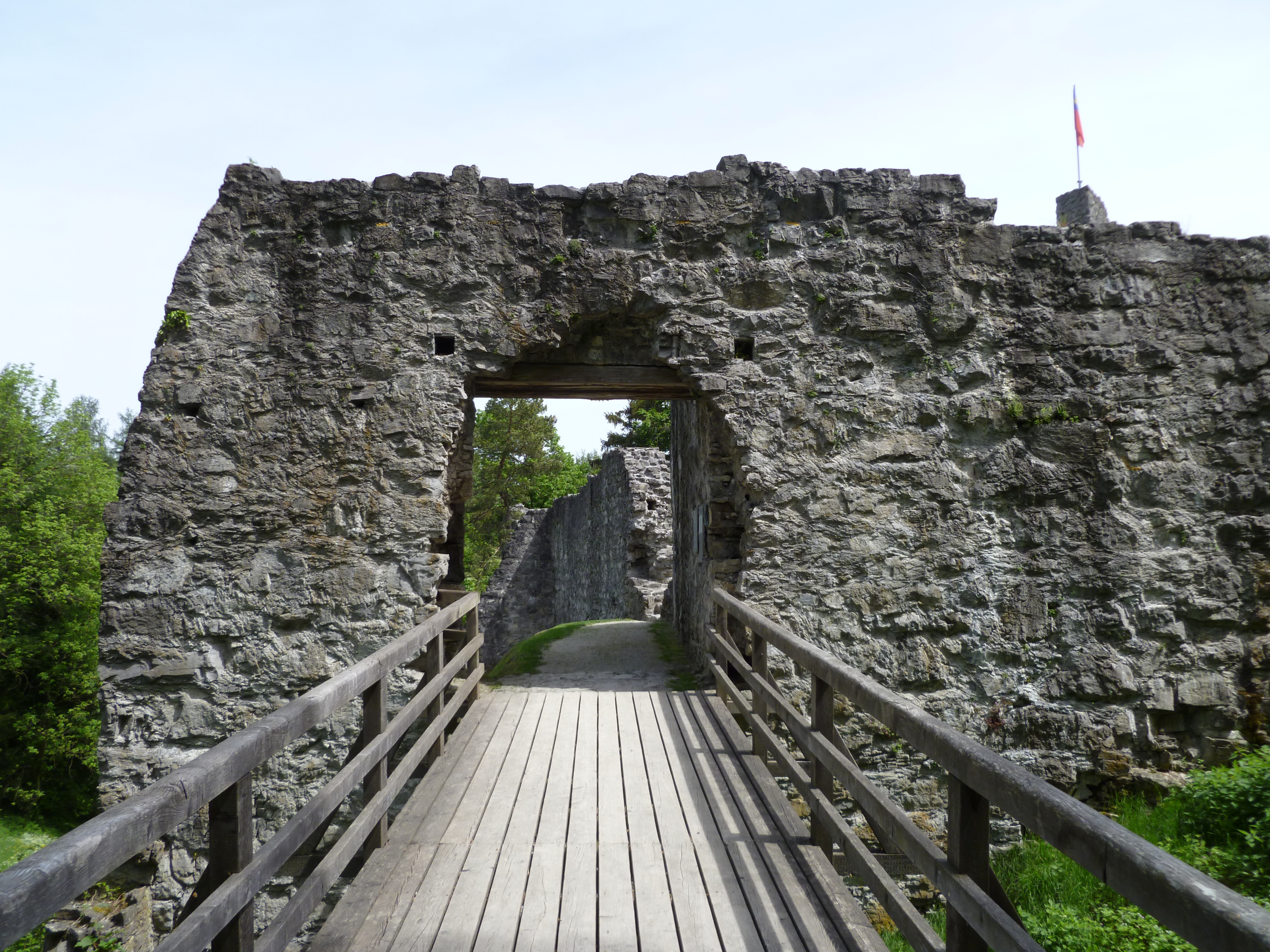
Castle gate

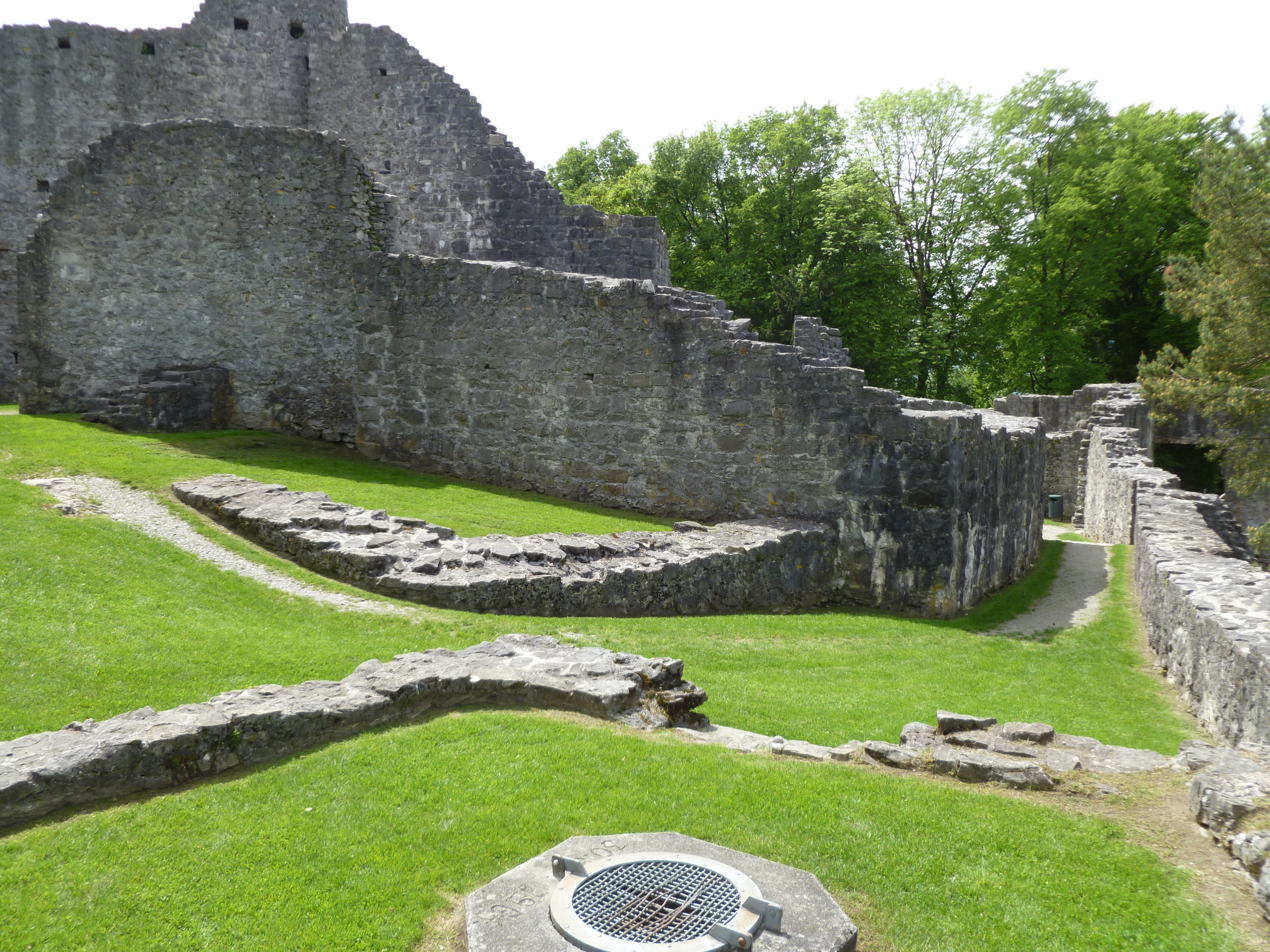
Remains of castle building

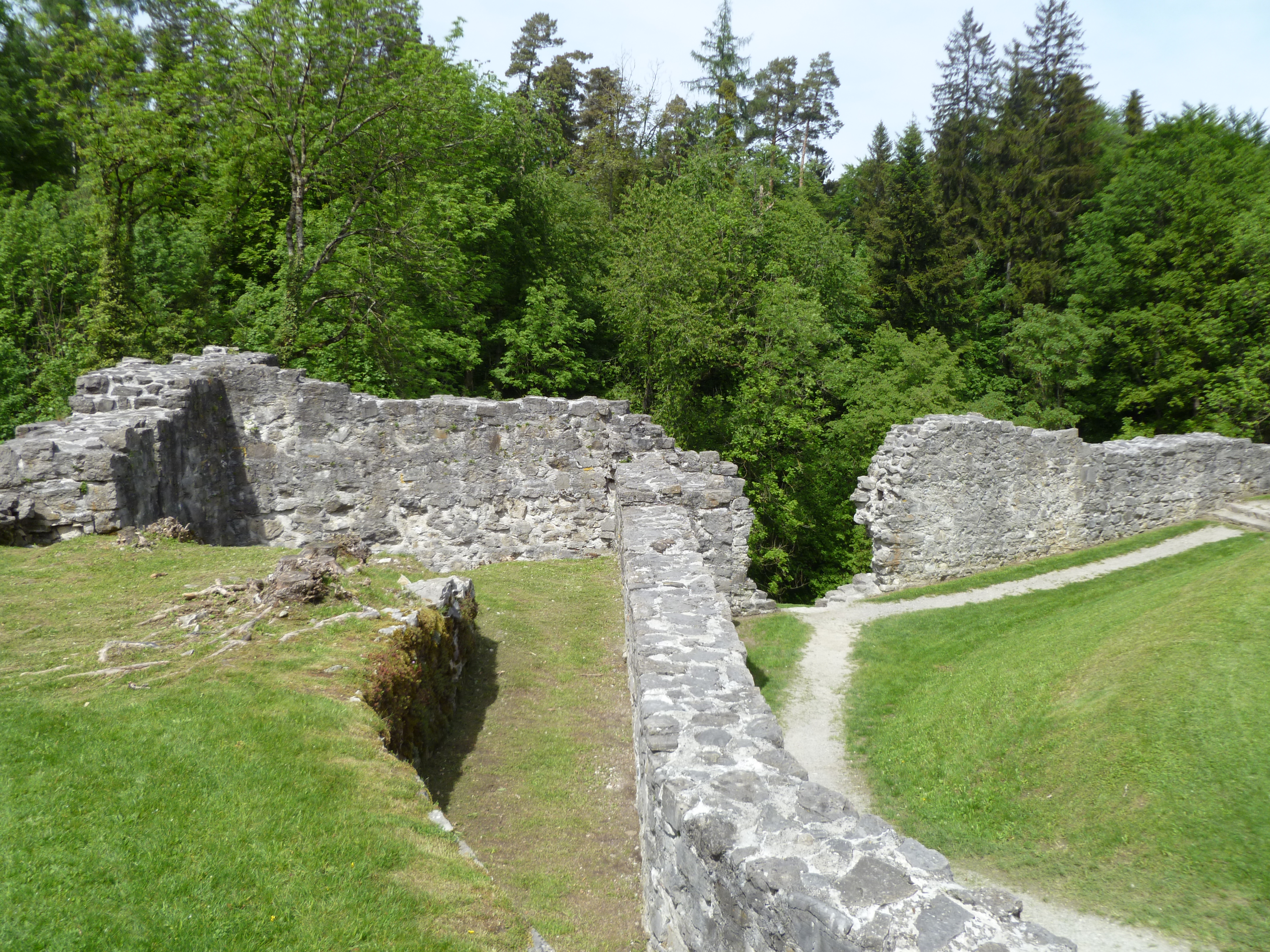
Castle wall

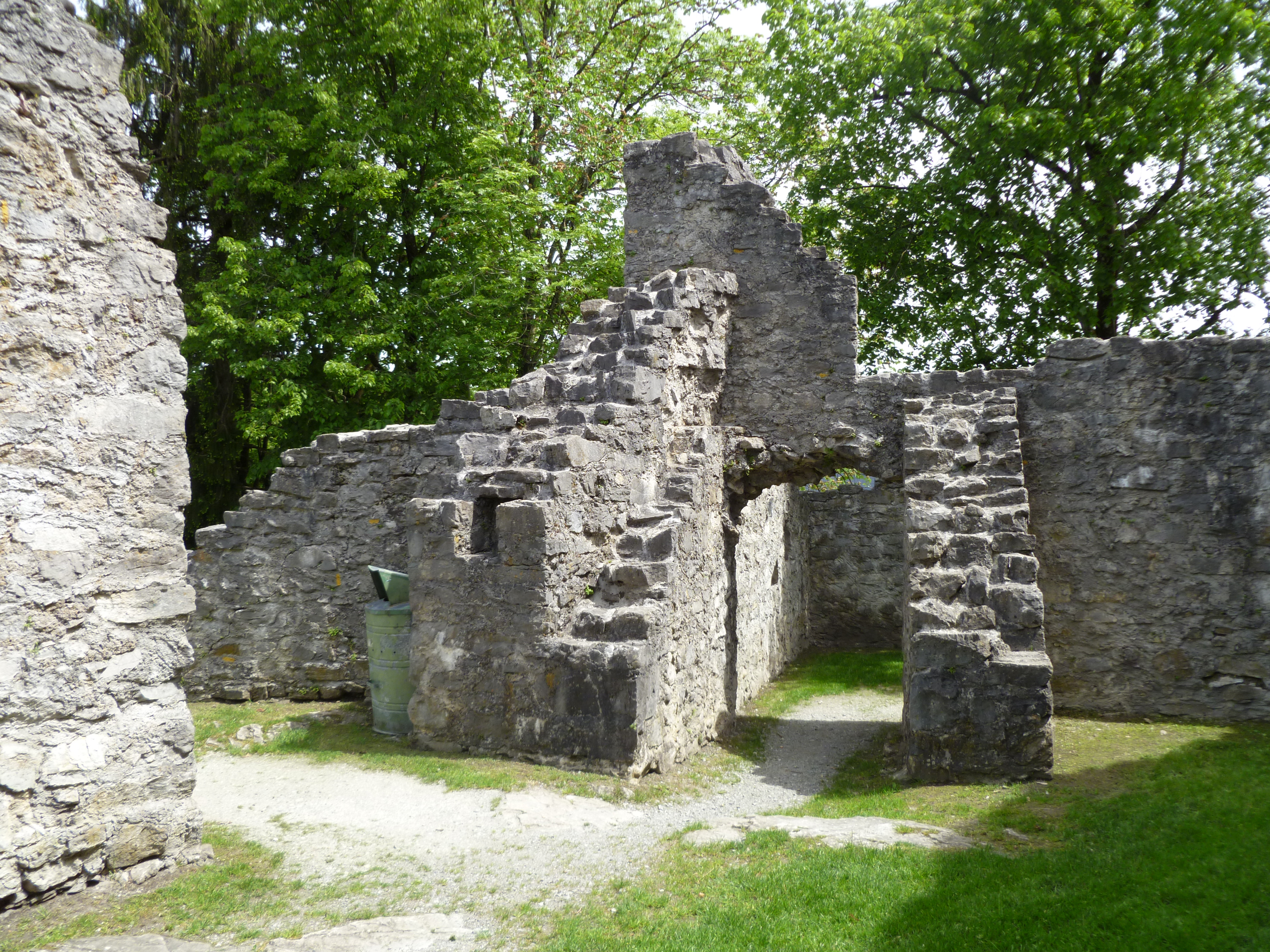
Remains of castle buildings

== See also ==
- Untere Burg - The other castle ruin in the municipality of Schellenberg.
- List of castles in Liechtenstein
